= 2018–19 Al Ittihad Alexandria Club season =

104th season of Al Ittihad

Al Ittihad
2018–19 season
- President: Mohamed Meselhy
- Manager: Mohamed Omar (until 22 September); Helmy Toulan (until 22 May); Talaat Youssef (caretaker, from 22 May)
- Stadium: Alexandria Stadium; Borg El Arab Stadium
- Egyptian Premier League: 11th
- Egypt Cup: Semi-finals
- Arab Club Champions Cup: Quarter-finals
- Top goalscorer: League: Khaled Kamar (14 goals); All: Khaled Kamar (18 goals)
Home colours	Away colours

The 2018–19 Al Ittihad season was the 104th season in the football club's history and 49th consecutive and 58th overall season in the top flight of Egyptian football, the Egyptian Premier League, having been promoted from the Egyptian Second Division in 1961. In addition to the domestic league, Al Ittihad also competed in this season's editions of the domestic cup, the Egypt Cup, and the first-tier Arab cup, the Arab Club Champions Cup. The season covered a period from 1 July 2018 to 30 June 2019; however Al Ittihad played their first match of the season in May 2018 and played their last match in September 2019.

== Kit information ==
Supplier: Uhlsport

Home	Home alt.	Home alt. 2	Away	Home (Arab)	Away (Arab)

== Players ==
=== Current squad ===
As of 1 February 2019

Note: Flags indicate national team as defined under FIFA eligibility rules; some limited exceptions apply. Players may hold more than one non-FIFA nationality.

No.	Pos.	Nation	Player
1	GK	EGY	El Hany Soliman (Captain)
3	MF	EGY	Ahmed Tawfik (on loan from Pyramids)
4	DF	EGY	Mahmoud Rizk
5	MF	EGY	Ahmed Dawouda (on loan from Zamalek)
6	DF	EGY	Sabry Raheel
7	FW	GBS	Toni Silva
8	MF	EGY	Ahmed Nabil
9	FW	EGY	Mohamed Abdel Maguid
10	MF	EGY	Khaled El Ghandour
11	DF	EGY	El Sayed Salem
12	FW	NGR	Derick Ogbu
13	DF	EGY	Mohamed Nasef (on loan from Tala'ea El Gaish)
14	MF	EGY	Nour El Sayed (4th captain)
15	FW	EGY	Gedo
16	GK	EGY	Mahmoud El Zonfouly

No.	Pos.	Nation	Player
17	DF	EGY	Karim El Deeb (on loan from Al Mokawloon Al Arab)
18	MF	EGY	Karim Mamdouh
19	FW	EGY	Khaled Kamar
20	DF	EGY	Bazoka (Vice-captain)
21	MF	EGY	Mohamed Adel (3rd captain)
22	FW	EGY	Amar Hamdy (on loan from Al Ahly)
25	DF	EGY	Mohamed Anwar
27	DF	EGY	Mahmoud Shaaban
32	FW	EGY	Fawzy El Henawy (on loan from Al Ahly)
33	GK	EGY	Sobhy Soliman
55	DF	BRA	Wallace da Silva
66	FW	CIV	Razack Cissé (on loan from Zamalek)
77	DF	EGY	Hesham Salah
-	DF	EGY	Reda Abdel Aal
-	MF	EGY	Shady Dawood

=== Out on loan ===
Note: Flags indicate national team as defined under FIFA eligibility rules; some limited exceptions apply. Players may hold more than one non-FIFA nationality.

No.	Pos.	Nation	Player
—	GK	EGY	Amr Khalil (at Tersana until 30 June 2019)
—	DF	TOG	Wilson Akakpo (at Al Shoulla until 30 June 2019)
—	DF	EGY	Mohamed Gabr (at Amanat Baghdad until 30 June 2019)
—	DF	EGY	Marwan El Nagar (at Petrojet until 30 June 2019)

No.	Pos.	Nation	Player
—	MF	EGY	Mohamed Hassan (at El Raja until 30 June 2019)
—	MF	CIV	Didier Koré (at Nogoom until 30 June 2019)
—	FW	EGY	Ahmed El Alfi (at El Gouna until 30 June 2019)
—	FW	GHA	Emmanuel Banahene (at Al Shoulla until 30 June 2019)

== Transfers ==
=== Transfers in ===
#	Position	Player	Transferred from	Fee	Date	Source
25	GK	(Egypt) Mahmoud El Gharabawy	(Egypt) El Dakhleya	Free transfer	2 May 2018	
12	MF	(Ivory Coast) Didier Koré	(Egypt) Al Mokawloon Al Arab	Free transfer	2 May 2018	
6	DF	(Egypt) Ahmed Magdy	(Egypt) Petrojet	Undisclosed	11 May 2018	
3	DF	(Egypt) Mohamed Gabr	(Egypt) El Raja	Undisclosed	11 May 2018	
16	GK	(Egypt) Mahmoud El Zonfouly	(Egypt) El Raja	E£5m	14 May 2018	
19	FW	(Egypt) Khaled Kamar	(Egypt) Zamalek	Undisclosed	4 June 2018	
7	DF	(Egypt) Ramzy Khaled	(Egypt) Zamalek	Undisclosed	11 June 2018	
23	MF	(Egypt) Mohamed Hassan	(Egypt) Ittihad Nabarouh	Undisclosed	14 June 2018	
4	DF	(Egypt) Mahmoud Rizk	(Egypt) El Entag El Harby	Free transfer	25 June 2018	
21	FW	(Egypt) Ahmed El Sheikh	(Egypt) Tala'ea El Gaish	End of loan	30 June 2018	
8	MF	(Egypt) Ahmed Nabil	(Egypt) Smouha	E£4m	20 December 2018	
	MF	(Egypt) Shady Dawood	(Netherlands) Den Bosch	Undisclosed	28 December 2018	
12	FW	(Nigeria) Derick Ogbu	(Georgia (country)) Tskhinvali	Undisclosed	29 December 2018	
	DF	(Egypt) Reda Abdel Aal	(Egypt) MS El Qais	Undisclosed	3 January 2019	
55	DF	(Brazil) Wallace da Silva	(Romania) Dunărea Călărași	Free transfer	6 January 2019	
6	DF	(Egypt) Sabry Raheel	(Egypt) Al Ahly	E£3m	7 January 2019	
77	DF	(Egypt) Hesham Salah	Telecom Egypt	Undisclosed	9 January 2019	
25	DF	(Egypt) Mohamed Anwar	(Egypt) Wadi Degla	E£700k	9 January 2019	
11	DF	(Egypt) El Sayed Salem	(Egypt) Wadi Degla	Swap deal	15 January 2019	
18	MF	(Egypt) Karim Mamdouh	(Egypt) Wadi Degla	Swap deal	15 January 2019	
7	FW	(Guinea-Bissau) Toni Silva	(South Africa) Mamelodi Sundowns	Undisclosed	18 January 2019	

==== Loans in ====
#	Position	Player	Loaned from	Date	Loan expires	Source
32	FW	(Egypt) Fawzy El Henawy	(Egypt) Al Ahly	6 May 2018	30 June 2019	
66	FW	(Ivory Coast) Razack Cissé	(Egypt) Zamalek	4 June 2018	30 June 2019	
17	MF	(Egypt) Karim El Deeb	(Egypt) Al Mokawloon Al Arab	10 June 2018	30 June 2019	
5	MF	(Egypt) Ahmed Dawouda	(Egypt) Zamalek	11 June 2018	30 June 2019	
13	DF	(Egypt) Mohamed Nasef	(Egypt) Tala'ea El Gaish	25 July 2018	30 June 2019	
22	FW	(Egypt) Amar Hamdy	(Egypt) Al Ahly	5 January 2019	30 June 2019	
3	MF	(Egypt) Ahmed Tawfik	(Egypt) Pyramids	21 January 2019	30 June 2019	

=== Transfers out ===
Position	Player	Transferred to	Fee	Date	Source
MF	(Egypt) Mahmoud Farag	(Egypt) El Entag El Harby	Undisclosed	30 May 2018	
DF	(Egypt) Hesham Shehata	(Egypt) El Entag El Harby	E£250k	6 June 2018	
FW	(Egypt) Ahmed El Sheikh	(Egypt) Haras El Hodoud	Free transfer	30 June 2018	
DF	(Egypt) Shawky El Said	Released		30 June 2018	
FW	(Egypt) Karim Mostafa	(Egypt) Al Mokawloon Al Arab	End of loan	30 June 2018	
DF	(Egypt) Mohamed Ahmed	(Egypt) Zamalek	End of loan	30 June 2018	
GK	(Egypt) Reda El Sayed	(Egypt) Aswan	End of loan	30 June 2018	
MF	(Tunisia) Mohamed Ali Moncer	(Tunisia) Espérance de Tunis	End of loan	30 June 2018	
MF	(Egypt) Ahmed Kabouria	(Egypt) Zamalek	End of loan	30 June 2018	
MF	(Egypt) Mohamed Osama	(Saudi Arabia) Al Muzahimiyyah	Undisclosed	18 August 2018	
FW	(Ivory Coast) Manucho	(Tunisia) CS Sfaxien	Undisclosed	23 August 2018	
GK	(Egypt) Mahmoud El Gharabawy	(Egypt) El Gouna	E£600k	16 December 2018	
MF	(Egypt) Ashour El Adham	(Egypt) Haras El Hodoud	Undisclosed	10 January 2019	
DF	(Egypt) Ramzy Khaled	(Egypt) Wadi Degla	Swap deal	15 January 2019	
MF	(Egypt) Ahmed Magdy	(Egypt) El Entag El Harby	Undisclosed	29 January 2019	

==== Loans out ====
Position	Player	Loaned to	Date	Loan expires	Source
GK	(Egypt) Amr Khalil	(Egypt) Tersana	21 June 2018	30 June 2019	
DF	(Togo) Wilson Akakpo	(Saudi Arabia) Al Shoulla	7 January 2019	30 June 2019	
FW	(Ghana) Emmanuel Banahene	(Saudi Arabia) Al Shoulla	7 January 2019	30 June 2019	
MF	(Ivory Coast) Didier Koré	(Egypt) Nogoom	8 January 2019	30 June 2019	
FW	(Egypt) Ahmed El Alfi	(Egypt) El Gouna	17 January 2019	30 June 2019	
DF	(Egypt) Marwan El Nagar	(Egypt) Petrojet	17 January 2019	30 June 2019	
DF	(Egypt) Mohamed Gabr	(Iraq) Amanat Baghdad	21 January 2019	30 June 2019	
MF	(Egypt) Mohamed Hassan	(Egypt) El Raja	23 January 2019	30 June 2019	

== Friendly matches ==
Win Draw Loss

10 July 2018	Al Ittihad (Egypt)	7–0	(Egypt) El Teram	Alexandria, Egypt
16:00 CAT (UTC+2)	Kamar (??); El Henawy (??); Banahene (??); El Alfi (??)	Report		Stadium: Tolip Stadium

11 July 2018	Al Ittihad (Egypt)	6–1	(Egypt) Housh Eissa	Alexandria, Egypt
16:00 CAT (UTC+2)	Bakar (??); Hassan (??); El Sayed (??); Gedo (??); Banahene (??)	Report	?? (??)	Stadium: Tolip Stadium

16 July 2018	Haras El Hodoud (Egypt)	1–4	(Egypt) Al Ittihad	Alexandria, Egypt
15:30 CAT (UTC+2)	?? (??)	Report	Cissé (??); Banahene (??); Akakpo (??)	Stadium: Haras El Hodoud Stadium

23 July 2018	Al Ittihad (Egypt)	2–0	(Egypt) ENPPI	Alexandria, Egypt
16:00 CAT (UTC+2)	Bazoka (??); Kamar (??)	Report		Stadium: Alexandria Stadium; Attendance: 5,000

29 December 2018	Al Ittihad (Egypt)	4–1	(Egypt) Rasheed	Alexandria, Egypt
13:45 CAT (UTC+2)	Gedo (??); Kamar (??); El Henawy (??)	Report	?? (??)	Stadium: Al Ittihad Club Stadium - Smouha

13 January 2019	Al Ittihad (Egypt)	2–1	(Egypt) El Horreya	Alexandria, Egypt
13:00 CAT (UTC+2)	Bazoka (??); Hassan (??)	Report	?? (??)	Stadium: Al Ittihad Club Stadium - Smouha

18 January 2019	Al Ittihad (Egypt)	2–0	(United Arab Emirates) Ajman	Cairo, Egypt
14:00 CAT (UTC+2)	Shaaban (??); Kamar (??)	Report		Stadium: 30 June Stadium subfield

21 January 2019	Al Ittihad (Egypt)	2–1	(Egypt) El Raja	Cairo, Egypt
13:00 CAT (UTC+2)	Chuka (??); Silva (??)	Report	?? (??)	Stadium: 30 June Stadium subfield

21 February 2019	Al Ittihad (Egypt)	1–0	(Egypt) Sporting Alexandria	Alexandria, Egypt
14:00 CAT (UTC+2)	Gedo 76'	Report		Stadium: Al Ittihad Club Stadium - Smouha

23 March 2019	Al Ittihad (Egypt)	6–0	(Egypt) Ras El Bar	Alexandria, Egypt
14:00 CAT (UTC+2)	Gedo 20', 44'; Dawouda 27'; Chuka 33'; Mamdouh 48'; Manga 87'	Report		Stadium: Al Ittihad Club Stadium - Smouha

24 March 2019	Al Ittihad (Egypt)	5–1	(Egypt) Labanita	Alexandria, Egypt
14:00 CAT (UTC+2)	Gedo 13'; Dawouda 21' (pen.); Abdel Maguid 26'; El Ghandour 76'; El Sayed 90+1'	Report	?? 67'	Stadium: Al Ittihad Club Stadium - Smouha

26 March 2019	Al Ittihad (Egypt)	2–0	(Egypt) Sporting Alexandria	Alexandria, Egypt
14:00 CAT (UTC+2)	Kamar 23'; Tawfik 24'	Report		Stadium: Al Ittihad Club Stadium - Smouha

23 April 2019	Al Ittihad (Egypt)	6–0	(Egypt) MIDO Coatings	Alexandria, Egypt
14:15 CAT (UTC+2)	Gedo (??); Abdel Maguid (??); Chuka (??); El Ghandour (??); Cissé (??)	Report		Stadium: Al Ittihad Club Stadium - Smouha

== Competitions ==
Win Draw Loss

=== Overview ===
Competition	First match	Last match	Starting round	Final position	Record							
Competition	First match	Last match	Starting round	Final position	Pld	W	D	L	GF	GA	GD	Win %
Egyptian Premier League	31 July 2018	3 June 2019	Matchday 1	11th	34	9	12	13	41	56	−15	26.47
Egypt Cup	11 October 2018	1 September 2019	Round of 32	Semi-finals	4	2	1	1	6	3	+3	50.00
Arab Club Champions Cup	18 May 2018	25 February 2019	Play-off round	Quarter-finals	9	3	4	2	18	8	+10	33.33
Total					47	14	17	16	65	67	−2	29.79

Source: Competitions

=== Egyptian Premier League ===
==== League table ====
Pos	Team	Pld	W	D	L	GF	GA	GD	Pts
9	ENPPI	34	9	13	12	39	42	−3	40 (Note: Tied on head-to-head points (3), on head-to-head goal difference (0), on head-to-head goals scored (3) and on head-to-head away goals scored (2). Overall goal difference: ENPPI –3, Wadi Degla –6.)
10	Wadi Degla	34	10	10	14	41	47	−6	40
11	Al Ittihad	34	9	12	13	41	56	−15	39
12	Smouha	34	8	14	12	33	41	−8	38 (Note: Head-to-head points: Smouha 10, El Entag El Harby 8, El Gouna 7, Haras El Hodoud 5.)
13	El Entag El Harby	34	8	14	12	36	44	−8	38

Source: Soccerway
Rules for classification: 1) Points; 2) Head-to-Head points; 3) Head-to-Head goal difference; 4) Head-to-Head goals scored; 5) Head-to-Head away goals scored; 6) Goal difference; 7) Goals scored (Note: Head-to-head record is used only after all the matches between the teams in question have been played).

==== Results summary ====
Overall								Home						Away					
Pld	W	D	L	GF	GA	GD	Pts	W	D	L	GF	GA	GD	W	D	L	GF	GA	GD
34	9	12	13	41	56	−15	39	3	9	5	19	23	−4	6	3	8	22	33	−11

Source: Soccerway

==== Results by round ====
Round	1	2	3	4	5	6	7	8	9	10	11	12	13	14	15	16	17	18	19	20	21	22	23	24	25	26	27	28	29	30	31	32	33	34
Ground	H	A	H	A	H	A	H	A	H	A	H	A	A	H	A	H	A	A	H	A	H	A	H	A	H	A	H	A	H	H	A	H	A	H
Result	D	L	W	D	D	D	D	L	W	W	D	L	L	L	W	D	D	L	L	L	D	W	D	W	D	W	L	L	L	D	W	D	L	W
Position	10	16	11	12	13	13	13	14	9	6	5	8	8	11	6	8	9	10	13	15	15	12	13	14	14	7	8	9	10	14	8	9	13	11

Source: Soccerway
A = Away; H = Home; W = Win; D = Draw; L = Loss

==== Matches ====
31 July 2018 1	Al Ittihad	1–1	Al Mokawloon Al Arab	Alexandria
18:00 CAT (UTC+2)	Banahene 9'	Report	Taher 68'	Stadium: Alexandria Stadium; Referee: Tarek Magdy

4 August 2018 2	Zamalek	5–1	Al Ittihad	Cairo
20:00 CAT (UTC+2)	Kahraba 1'; Obama 11'; Alaa 37' (pen.); Kasongo 65'; Antar 81'	Report	Kamar 56'	Stadium: Petro Sport Stadium; Referee: Ibrahim Nour El Din

17 August 2018 3	Al Ittihad	1–0	Ismaily	Alexandria
18:00 CAT (UTC+2)	Cissé 30'	Report		Stadium: Alexandria Stadium; Referee: Mahmoud Nagy

25 August 2018 4	Al Masry	2–2	Al Ittihad	Alexandria (Note: Al Masry v Al Ittihad match was played at Borg El Arab Stadium in Alexandria instead of Al Masry Club Stadium in Port Said due to security concerns.)
17:30 CAT (UTC+2)	Shoukry 66'; Moussa 69'	Report	Gedo 67'; Cissé 90+5'	Stadium: Borg El Arab Stadium; Referee: Mohamed Maarouf

12 September 2018 6	Haras El Hodoud	1–1	Al Ittihad	Alexandria
15:30 CAT (UTC+2)	Gamal 90+7' (pen.)	Report	Kamar 58'	Stadium: Haras El Hodoud Stadium; Referee: Gehad Grisha

17 September 2018 7	Al Ittihad	1–1	El Entag El Harby	Alexandria
18:00 CAT (UTC+2)	Kamar 38'	Report	Ragab 80'	Stadium: Alexandria Stadium; Referee: Amin Omar

21 September 2018 8	El Dakhleya	3–0	Al Ittihad	Cairo
15:30 CAT (UTC+2)	Salama 23', 40'; Ouka 54'	Report		Stadium: Police Academy Stadium; Referee: Mohamed Youssef

28 September 2018 (Note: Al Ittihad v Wadi Degla match, originally scheduled to be played on 2 September 2018, was postponed due to conflicting with Espérance de Tunis v Al Ittihad match in the Arab Club Champions Cup, which was set to be played on the same day. The match was later rescheduled to be played on 28 September 2018.) 5	Al Ittihad	2–2	Wadi Degla	Alexandria
17:00 CAT (UTC+2)	Banahene 9', 75'	Report	Ndiaye 74'; Marie 86'	Stadium: Alexandria Stadium; Referee: Mohamed El Hanafy

2 October 2018 9	Al Ittihad	2–1	El Gouna	Alexandria
17:30 CAT (UTC+2)	El Deeb 37'; Gedo 90+3'	Report	Ali 90'	Stadium: Alexandria Stadium; Referee: Mahmoud El Banna

7 October 2018 10	Al Ahly	3–4	Al Ittihad	Cairo
21:00 CAT (UTC+2)	M. Mohsen 30'; Soliman 61'; Sherif 90+1'	Report	Ashraf 19' (o.g.); Kamar 40'; Koré 54' (pen.); El Alfi 88'	Stadium: Al Salam Stadium; Referee: Mohamed Maarouf

20 October 2018 11	Al Ittihad	1–1	Petrojet	Alexandria
19:00 CAT (UTC+2)	Cissé 27'	Report	Bekele 61'	Stadium: Alexandria Stadium; Referee: Mahmoud Ashour

2 November 2018 12	Pyramids	3–0	Al Ittihad	Cairo
17:30 CAT (UTC+2)	Mansour 13'; Bakar 61'; Keno 74'	Report		Stadium: 30 June Stadium; Referee: Gehad Grisha

8 November 2018 13	Misr Lel Makkasa	1–0	Al Ittihad	Cairo (Note: Misr Lel Makkasa v Al Ittihad match was played at Osman Ahmed Osman Stadium in Cairo instead of Faiyum Stadium in Faiyum due to pitch status.)
19:00 CAT (UTC+2)	Voavy 11'	Report		Stadium: Osman Ahmed Osman Stadium; Referee: Mohamed El Hanafy

12 November 2018 14	Al Ittihad	0–2	Nogoom	Alexandria
17:00 CAT (UTC+2)		Report	Amin 4'; Abdel Halim 71'	Stadium: Alexandria Stadium; Referee: Walid Abdel Aziz

20 November 2018 15	ENPPI	0–1	Al Ittihad	Cairo
18:00 CAT (UTC+2)		Report	Cissé 24'	Stadium: Petro Sport Stadium; Referee: Mohamed Adel

25 November 2018 16	Al Ittihad	1–1	Tala'ea El Gaish	Alexandria
17:30 CAT (UTC+2)	Kamar 6'	Report	Mostafa 47'	Stadium: Alexandria Stadium; Referee: Mahmoud Ashour

12 December 2018 17	Smouha	1–1	Al Ittihad	Alexandria
17:00 CAT (UTC+2)	Oukri 54'	Report	Cissé 90+6'	Stadium: Borg El Arab Stadium; Referee: Gehad Grisha

21 December 2018 18	Al Mokawloon Al Arab	2–1	Al Ittihad	Cairo
19:00 CAT (UTC+2)	H. Soliman 4' (o.g.); Ali 26'	Report	Gedo 45+3'	Stadium: Osman Ahmed Osman Stadium; Referee: Ahmed Hamdy

5 January 2019 (Note: Al Ittihad v Zamalek match, originally scheduled to be played on 14 January 2019, was played on 5 January 2019 to avoid scheduling conflicts.) 19	Al Ittihad	1–3	Zamalek	Alexandria
18:00 CAT (UTC+2)	El Ghandour 29'	Report	El Said 32'; Kahraba 45'; Alaa 90+5' (pen.)	Stadium: Borg El Arab Stadium; Referee: Mahmoud Ashour

28 January 2019 20	Ismaily	2–0	Al Ittihad	Ismailia
17:00 CAT (UTC+2)	Bambo 38'; Abdel Hakim 90+2'	Report		Stadium: Ismailia Stadium; Referee: Gehad Grisha

4 February 2019 21	Al Ittihad	2–2	Al Masry	Suez (Note: Al Ittihad v Al Masry match was played at the Egyptian Army Stadium in Suez instead of Alexandria Stadium in Alexandria by an order from the Egyptian Football Association.)
17:00 CAT (UTC+2)	Hamdy 61', 90+1'	Report	Simporé 12' (pen.); Hamad 70'	Stadium: Egyptian Army Stadium; Referee: Mohamed El Hanafy

10 February 2019 22	Wadi Degla	1–3	Al Ittihad	Cairo
18:00 CAT (UTC+2)	Arafat 37'	Report	Kamar 30', 44'; Gedo 85'	Stadium: Petro Sport Stadium; Referee: Mahmoud Ashour

2 March 2019 25	Al Ittihad	1–1	El Dakhleya	Alexandria
17:30 CAT (UTC+2)	Kamar 17'	Report	A. El Sayed 19'	Stadium: Borg El Arab Stadium; Referee: Mohamed Maarouf

7 March 2019 (Note: El Entag El Harby v Al Ittihad match, originally scheduled to be played on 26 February 2019, was postponed due to conflicting with Al Ittihad v Al Hilal match in the Arab Club Champions Cup, which was set to be played on 25 February 2019. The match was later rescheduled to be played on 6 March 2019.) 24	El Entag El Harby	2–4	Al Ittihad	Cairo
19:00 CAT (UTC+2)	El Badry 45+2', 76' (pen.)	Report	Kamar 53' (pen.), 90+4'; Hamdy 55'; Manga 88'	Stadium: Petro Sport Stadium (Note: El Entag El Harby v Al Ittihad match was played at Petro Sport Stadium instead of Al Salam Stadium due to maintenance.); Referee: Mohamed Adel

12 March 2019 26	El Gouna	1–2	Al Ittihad	El Gouna
15:00 CAT (UTC+2)	Gedo 56'	Report	Kamar 35'; Tawfik 86'	Stadium: El Gouna Stadium; Referee: Mohamed El Sabahy

17 March 2019 (Note: Al Ittihad v Haras El Hodoud match, originally scheduled to be played on 21 February 2019, was postponed due to conflicting with Ismaily v Al Ittihad match in the Egypt Cup, which was set to be played on the same day. The match was later rescheduled to be played on 17 March 2019. Despite Ismaily v Al Ittihad match was however later postponed too, the Egyptian Football Association refused to change the date for this match again.) 23	Al Ittihad	1–1	Haras El Hodoud	Alexandria
18:00 CAT (UTC+2)	Kamar 90+4'	Report	Moses 60'	Stadium: Borg El Arab Stadium; Referee: Ahmed El Ghandour

2 April 2019 27	Al Ittihad	0–2	Al Ahly	Alexandria
19:30 CAT (UTC+2)		Report	Maâloul 90+2'; Gomaa 90+8'	Stadium: Borg El Arab Stadium; Referee: Gehad Grisha

7 April 2019 28	Petrojet	1–0	Al Ittihad	Suez
17:30 CAT (UTC+2)	Afifi 83'	Report		Stadium: Egyptian Army Stadium; Referee: Mohamed Maarouf

11 April 2019 29	Al Ittihad	2–3	Pyramids	Alexandria
20:00 CAT (UTC+2)	Cissé 35'; Kamar 63'	Report	Traoré 60', 82', 84'	Stadium: Haras El Hodoud Stadium (Note: Al Ittihad v Pyramids match was played at Haras El Hodoud Stadium instead of Borg El Arab Stadium due to pitch status.); Referee: Marius Avram (Romania)

19 April 2019 30	Al Ittihad	0–0	Misr Lel Makkasa	Alexandria
17:30 CAT (UTC+2)		Report		Stadium: Haras El Hodoud Stadium (Note: Al Ittihad v Misr Lel Makkasa match was played at Haras El Hodoud Stadium instead of Borg El Arab Stadium due to pitch status.); Referee: Ibrahim Nour El Din

30 April 2019 31	Nogoom	1–2	Al Ittihad	Cairo
17:30 CAT (UTC+2)	El Sayed 90' (o.g.)	Report	Kamar 26'; El Ghandour 73'	Stadium: Petro Sport Stadium; Referee: Mohamed Adel

10 May 2019 32	Al Ittihad	0–1	ENPPI	Alexandria
22:00 CAT (UTC+2)		Report	Fawzy 28'	Stadium: Haras El Hodoud Stadium (Note: Al Ittihad v ENPPI match was played at Haras El Hodoud Stadium instead of Borg El Arab Stadium due to pitch status.); Referee: Mohamed Maarouf

21 May 2019 33	Tala'ea El Gaish	4–0	Al Ittihad	Cairo
22:00 CAT (UTC+2)	Tarek 22', 56'; Abou El Magd 48'; Mostafa 87'	Report		Stadium: Gehaz El Reyada Stadium; Referee: Mohamed El Hanafy

3 June 2019 34	Al Ittihad	3–1	Smouha	Alexandria
22:00 CAT (UTC+2)	Cissé 3'; El Deeb 29'; Megahed 79' (o.g.)	Report	Hassan 87' (pen.)	Stadium: Borg El Arab Stadium; Referee: Mahmoud Ashour

=== Egypt Cup ===
11 October 2018 Round of 32	Al Ittihad	3–1	Porto Suez	Alexandria
18:00 CAT (UTC+2)	Banahene 9'; Kamar 55', 70'	Report	El Ghazaly 7'	Stadium: Alexandria Stadium; Referee: Mahmoud Roushdy

7 December 2018 (Note: Smouha v Al Ittihad match, originally scheduled to be played on 27 October 2018, was postponed due to conflicting with Al Ittihad v Zamalek match in the Arab Club Champions Cup, which was set to be played on the same day. The match was later rescheduled to be played on 7 December 2018) Round of 16	Smouha	0–0 (a.e.t.) (2–4 p)	Al Ittihad	Alexandria (Note: Starting from round of 16, all matches were played on stadiums selected by the Egyptian Football Association.)
19:00 CAT (UTC+2)		Report		Stadium: Borg El Arab Stadium; Referee: Mohamed Maarouf
	Penalties
	Ezzat (penalty scored); Manga (penalty missed); Moaz (penalty scored); Y. Ibrahim (penalty missed)		(penalty scored) Koré; (penalty scored) Cissé; (penalty scored) El Sayed; (penalty scored) Gedo

5 May 2019 (Note: Ismaily v Al Ittihad match, originally scheduled to be played on 2 April 2019, was postponed due to security concerns. The match was later rescheduled to be played on 5 May 2019.) Quarter-finals	Ismaily	1–3 (a.e.t.)	Al Ittihad	Cairo
17:00 CAT (UTC+2)	Bambo 81'	Report	Cissé 84'; Anwar 103'; Kamar 108'	Stadium: Osman Ahmed Osman Stadium; Referee: Ahmed El Ghandour

1 September 2019 Semi-finals	Zamalek	1–0 (a.e.t.)	Al Ittihad	Ismailia
20:00 CAT (UTC+2)	Mostafa 99'	Report		Stadium: Ismailia Stadium; Referee: Aliyar Aghayev (Azerbaijan)

=== Arab Club Champions Cup ===
==== Group B ====
Pos	Team	Pld	W	D	L	GF	GA	GD	Pts	Qualification	ITH	FUS	SAL	ADT
1	(Egypt) Al-Ittihad Alexandria	3	2	1	0	14	1	+13	7	Advance to First round	—	1–1		8–0
2	(Morocco) FUS Rabat	3	2	1	0	13	1	+12	7			—	5–0	
3	(Kuwait) Al-Salmiya	3	1	0	2	4	10	−6	3		0–5		—	4–0
4	ASAS Djibouti Télécom	3	0	0	3	0	19	−19	0			0–7		—

Source: Goalzz
Rules for classification: 1) Points; 2) Goal difference; 3) Goals scored.

18 May 2018 1	Al Ittihad (Egypt)	1–1	(Morocco) FUS Rabat	Jeddah, Saudi Arabia
21:30 AST (UTC+3)	Cissé 26'	Report	Louadni 12'	Stadium: King Abdullah Sports City; Referee: Mohammed Al Hoish (Saudi Arabia)

21 May 2018 2	Al Salmiya (Kuwait)	0–5	(Egypt) Al Ittihad	Jeddah, Saudi Arabia
21:30 AST (UTC+3)		Report	Banahene 18', 90'; El Deeb 43'; Cissé 63'; Khaled 83'	Stadium: King Abdullah Sports City; Referee: Mohanad Qassim (Iraq)

24 May 2018 3	Al Ittihad (Egypt)	8–0	ASAS Djibouti Télécom	Jeddah, Saudi Arabia
22:00 AST (UTC+3)	Cissé 5'; Banahene 18', 43'; Gedo 55', 83', 90+1'; Kabouria 81'; Abdel Maguid 82'	Report		Stadium: King Abdullah Sports City; Referee: Khalid Saleh Al Turais (Saudi Arabia)

==== First round ====
9 August 2018 First leg	Al Ittihad (Egypt)	1–1	(Tunisia) Espérance de Tunis	Alexandria, Egypt
19:00 CAT (UTC+2)	Cissé 62'	Report	Mejri 70'	Stadium: Alexandria Stadium; Referee: Mohammed Al Hoish (Saudi Arabia)

2 September 2018 Second leg	Espérance de Tunis (Tunisia)	2–2 (3–3 (a) agg.)	(Egypt) Al Ittihad	Radès, Tunisia
20:00 WAT (UTC+1)	Belaïli 7'; Kom 52'	Report	Kamar 20'; Gedo 43'	Stadium: Stade Olympique de Radès; Referee: Mohanad Qassim (Iraq)

==== Second round ====
27 October 2018 First leg	Al Ittihad (Egypt)	0–1	(Egypt) Zamalek	Alexandria, Egypt
20:00 CAT (UTC+2)		Report	Kasongo 69'	Stadium: Borg El Arab Stadium; Referee: Youssef Essrayri (Tunisia)

30 November 2018 Second leg	Zamalek (Egypt)	0–1 (1–1 agg.) (3–4 p)	(Egypt) Al Ittihad	Cairo, Egypt
19:00 CAT (UTC+2)		Report	Banahene 84'	Stadium: Petro Sport Stadium; Referee: Ali Sabah (Iraq)
	Penalties
	Alaa (penalty missed); Sassi (penalty scored); Gomaa (penalty missed); Obama (penalty scored); Fathy (penalty scored); Nagguez (penalty missed)		(penalty missed) Bazoka; (penalty scored) Banahene; (penalty scored) Hassan; (penalty missed) El Deeb; (penalty scored) El Sayed; (penalty scored) Nasef

==== Quarter-finals ====
16 February 2019 First leg	Al Hilal (Saudi Arabia)	3–0	(Egypt) Al Ittihad	Riyadh, Saudi Arabia
20:00 AST (UTC+3)	Carlos Eduardo 14'; Gomis 31', 41'	Report		Stadium: King Saud University Stadium; Attendance: 15,184; Referee: Noureddine El Jaafari (Morocco)

25 February 2019 Second leg	Al Ittihad (Egypt)	0–0 (0–3 agg.)	(Saudi Arabia) Al Hilal	Alexandria, Egypt
17:00 CAT (UTC+2)		Report		Stadium: Borg El Arab Stadium; Referee: Mustapha Ghorbal (Algeria)

== Statistics ==
=== Appearances and goals ===
No.	Pos	Player	Egyptian Premier League		Egypt Cup		Arab Club Champions Cup		Total	
No.	Pos	Player	Apps	Goals	Apps	Goals	Apps	Goals	Apps	Goals
1	GK	(Egypt) El Hany Soliman	22	0	2	0	6	0	30	0
3	MF	(Egypt) Ahmed Tawfik	12	1	1	0	2	0	15	1
4	DF	(Egypt) Mahmoud Rizk	19+3	0	3	0	3+1	0	29	0
5	MF	(Egypt) Ahmed Dawouda	7+6	0	2	0	2+1	0	18	0
6	DF	(Egypt) Sabry Raheel	1+1	0	0	0	0	0	2	0
7	FW	(Guinea-Bissau) Toni Silva	5+2	0	0	0	2	0	9	0
8	MF	(Egypt) Ahmed Nabil	13+2	1	2	0	2	0	19	1
9	FW	(Egypt) Mohamed Abdel Maguid	1+3	0	0	0	0+3	1	7	1
10	MF	(Egypt) Khaled El Ghandour	23+3	2	2	0	6+1	0	35	2
11	DF	(Egypt) El Sayed Salem	13	0	2	0	2	0	17	0
12	FW	(Nigeria) Derick Ogbu	3+2	0	0	0	0	0	5	0
13	DF	(Egypt) Mohamed Nasef	12+2	0	2	0	2	0	18	0
14	MF	(Egypt) Nour El Sayed	32	0	4	0	9	0	45	0
15	FW	(Egypt) Gedo	9+15	4	0+2	0	4+2	4	32	8
16	GK	(Egypt) Mahmoud El Zonfouly	12+1	0	1	0	3	0	17	0
17	DF	(Egypt) Karim El Deeb	13+6	2	2+1	0	6+1	1	29	3
18	MF	(Egypt) Karim Mamdouh	3+7	0	0+1	0	0+2	0	13	0
19	FW	(Egypt) Khaled Kamar	30+1	14	3	3	6	1	40	18
20	FW	(Egypt) Bazoka	19	0	1	0	9	0	29	0
21	MF	(Egypt) Mohamed Adel	2+1	0	0	0	0+2	0	5	0
22	MF	(Egypt) Amar Hamdy	12+2	3	0+1	0	1+1	0	17	3
25	DF	(Egypt) Mohamed Anwar	8	0	2	1	0	0	10	1
27	DF	(Egypt) Mahmoud Shaaban	10+1	0	2	0	2	0	15	0
32	FW	(Egypt) Fawzy El Henawy	1+7	0	0+1	0	0	0	9	0
33	GK	(Egypt) Sobhy Soliman	0	0	0	0	0	0	0	0
55	DF	(Brazil) Wallace da Silva	5	0	0	0	0	0	5	0
66	FW	(Ivory Coast) Razack Cissé	28+4	7	3	1	8+1	4	44	12
77	DF	(Egypt) Hesham Salah	0	0	0	0	0	0	0	0
Players joined during the 2019 summer transfer window
1	GK	(Egypt) Emad El Sayed	0	0	1	0	0	0	1	0
12	DF	(Egypt) Osama El Azab	0	0	1	0	0	0	1	0
19	FW	(Egypt) Ahmed Heggy	0	0	0+1	0	0	0	1	0
24	MF	(Egypt) Hesham Mohamed	0	0	0+1	0	0	0	1	0
27	FW	(Uganda) Emmanuel Okwi	0	0	0+1	0	0	0	1	0
Players transferred out during the season
2	DF	(Togo) Wilson Akakpo	11	0	1	0	3	0	15	0
3	DF	(Egypt) Mohamed Gabr	4	0	1	0	0	0	5	0
6	MF	(Egypt) Ahmed Magdy	12+2	0	0	0	3	0	17	0
7	DF	(Egypt) Ramzy Khaled	5+1	0	1	0	4	1	11	1
11	FW	(Egypt) Ahmed El Alfi	0+10	1	0+2	0	0+4	0	16	1
12	MF	(Ivory Coast) Didier Koré	6+3	1	1+1	0	1	0	12	1
18	FW	(Ghana) Emmanuel Banahene	12+4	3	3	1	5+1	5	25	9
22	MF	(Egypt) Ashour El Adham	7+1	0	0	0	5	0	13	0
23	MF	(Egypt) Mohamed Hassan	0+5	0	1	0	0+2	0	8	0
25	GK	(Egypt) Mahmoud El Gharabawy	0	0	0	0	0	0	0	0
26	FW	(Egypt) Ahmed Kabouria	0	0	0	0	0+2	1	2	1
28	MF	(Egypt) Mohamed Osama	0+1	0	0	0	0	0	1	0
90	DF	(Egypt) Marwan El Nagar	2+1	0	0	0	3	0	6	0

=== Goalscorers ===
Rank	Position	Name	Egyptian Premier League	Egypt Cup	Arab Club Champions Cup	Total
1	FW	(Egypt) Khaled Kamar	14	3	1	18
2	FW	(Ivory Coast) Razack Cissé	7	1	4	12
3	FW	(Ghana) Emmanuel Banahene	3	1	5	9
4	FW	(Egypt) Gedo	4	0	4	8
5	DF	(Egypt) Karim El Deeb	2	0	1	3
5	FW	(Egypt) Amar Hamdy	3	0	0	3
7	MF	(Egypt) Khaled El Ghandour	2	0	0	2
8	FW	(Egypt) Mohamed Abdel Maguid	0	0	1	1
8	FW	(Egypt) Ahmed El Alfi	1	0	0	1
8	DF	(Egypt) Mohamed Anwar	0	1	0	1
8	FW	(Egypt) Ahmed Kabouria	0	0	1	1
8	DF	(Egypt) Ramzy Khaled	0	0	1	1
8	MF	(Ivory Coast) Didier Koré	1	0	0	1
8	MF	(Egypt) Ahmed Nabil	1	0	0	1
8	DF	(Egypt) Ahmed Tawfik	1	0	0	1
Own goal			2	0	0	2
Total			41	6	18	65

=== Clean sheets ===
Rank	Name	Egyptian Premier League	Egypt Cup	Arab Club Champions Cup	Total
1	(Egypt) El Hany Soliman	2	1	4	7
2	(Egypt) Mahmoud El Zonfouly	1	0	0	1
Total		3	1	4	8
