= 2018–19 Wadi Degla SC season =

Wadi Degla
2018–19 season
- President: Maged Samy
- Manager: Takis Gonias
- Stadium: Cairo Military Academy Stadium; Petro Sport Stadium
- Egyptian Premier League: 12th
- Egypt Cup: Round of 16
- Top goalscorer: League: Ibrahima Ndiaye (10 goals); All: Ibrahima Ndiaye (10 goals)
Home colours	Away colours
- All statistics correct as of 21 May 2019.

The 2018–19 Wadi Degla season is the 16th season in the football club's history and 7th consecutive and overall season in the top flight of Egyptian football, the Egyptian Premier League, having been promoted from the Egyptian Second Division in 2010. In addition to the domestic league, Wadi Degla also are participating in this season's editions of the domestic cup, the Egypt Cup. The season covers a period from 1 July 2018 to 30 June 2019.

== Kit information ==
Supplier: Joma
Sponsor: Neopolis

Home	Home alt.	Away	Away alt.	Goalkeeper 1	Goalkeeper 2

== Players ==
=== Current squad ===
As of 1 February 2019

Note: Flags indicate national team as defined under FIFA eligibility rules; some limited exceptions apply. Players may hold more than one non-FIFA nationality.

No.	Pos.	Nation	Player
1	GK	EGY	Mohamed Abdel Monsef (Vice-captain)
2	GK	EGY	Khaled Walid
3	DF	GHA	Issahaku Yakubu
4	DF	EGY	Khaled Reda
7	DF	EGY	Osama Azab
8	MF	EGY	Ramzy Khaled
9	FW	EGY	Mohamed Ashraf
10	FW	EGY	Mohamed El Gabbas (3rd captain)
11	FW	CIV	Yaya Soumahoro
12	MF	EGY	Mostafa Talaat
14	FW	EGY	Mohamed Helal
17	DF	EGY	Amr Saleh
18	GK	EGY	Mohamed Abdel Aati
19	FW	EGY	Hossam Arafat (Captain)

No.	Pos.	Nation	Player
20	FW	EGY	Ahmed Hassan
21	MF	GRE	Vasilis Bouzas
22	DF	EGY	Ayman Adel
25	FW	EGY	Mohamed Gamal
32	FW	EGY	Mohamed Reda
36	MF	EGY	Ahmed Ramadan
37	MF	EGY	Islam Ali
38	MF	EGY	Ibrahim Ayesh
40	MF	EGY	Taha Osman
44	DF	EGY	Mahmoud Marie
72	MF	EGY	Ahmed Said
77	DF	EGY	Abdel Rahman Youssef
90	FW	SEN	Ibrahima Ndiaye
98	DF	EGY	Bassam Walid

=== Out on loan ===
Note: Flags indicate national team as defined under FIFA eligibility rules; some limited exceptions apply. Players may hold more than one non-FIFA nationality.

No. / Pos. / Nation / Player; — / GK / EGY / Mahmoud Reda (at Ismaily until 30 June 2019)	No. / Pos. / Nation / Player; — / DF / EGY / Karim Hafez (at Kasımpaşa until 30 June 2019)

== Transfers ==
=== Transfers in ===
#	Position	Player	Transferred from	Fee	Date	Source
28	FW	(Egypt) Mohamed Ashraf Abd El Ader	(Egypt) Tala'ea El Gaish SC	Free transfer	3 May 2018	
25	DF	(Egypt) Amr Saleh	(Egypt) Baladeyet El Mahalla SC	Free transfer	28 May 2018	
7	DF	(Greece) Vasilis Bouzas	(Greece) Ergotelis F.C.	Free transfer	30 June 2018	
	DF	(Egypt) Ramzy Khaled	(Egypt) Al Ittihad Alexandria Club	Free transfer	16 January 2019	
	DF	(Ghana) Issahaku Yakubu	(Greece) Ergotelis F.C.	Undisclosed	19 January 2019	

=== Transfers out ===
Position	Player	Transferred to	Fee	Date	Source
FW	(Egypt) Omar El Said	(Egypt) Zamalek	Free transfer	20 May 2018	
FW	(Egypt) Mohamed Hassan	(Egypt) Zamalek	E£10m	14 July 2018	
DF	(Egypt) Mohamed Mahmoud	(Egypt) Al Ahly	E£20m	2 December 2018	
DF	(Egypt) El Sayed Salem	(Egypt) Al Ittihad Alexandria	Free transfer	29 December 2018	
DF	(Egypt) Mohamed Anwar	(Egypt) Al Ittihad Alexandria	E£700k	9 January 2019	

== Friendly matches ==
Win Draw Loss

14 July 2018	Wadi Degla (Egypt)	3–1	(Egypt) El Shams	Cairo, Egypt
16:00 CAT (UTC+2)		Report		Stadium: Cairo Military Academy Stadium

== Competitions ==
=== Overview ===
Competition	First match	Last match	Starting round	Final position	Record							
Competition	First match	Last match	Starting round	Final position	Pld	W	D	L	GF	GA	GD	Win %
Egyptian Premier League	1 August 2018	03 June 2019	Matchday 1	10th	34	10	10	14	39	46	−7	29.41
Egypt Cup	10 October 2018	24 October 2018	Round of 32	Round of 16	2	1	0	1	5	3	+2	50.00
Total					36	11	10	15	44	49	−5	30.56

Last updated: 21 May 2019
Source: Competitions

=== Egyptian Premier League ===
==== League table ====
Pos	Team	Pld	W	D	L	GF	GA	GD	Pts
8	Tala'ea El Gaish	34	10	11	13	41	39	+2	41
9	ENPPI	34	9	13	12	39	42	−3	40 (Note: Tied on head-to-head points (3), on head-to-head goal difference (0), on head-to-head goals scored (3) and on head-to-head away goals scored (2). Overall goal difference: ENPPI –3, Wadi Degla –6.)
10	Wadi Degla	34	10	10	14	41	47	−6	40
11	Al Ittihad	34	9	12	13	41	56	−15	39
12	Smouha	34	8	14	12	33	41	−8	38 (Note: Head-to-head points: Smouha 10, El Entag El Harby 8, El Gouna 7, Haras El Hodoud 5.)

Source: Soccerway
Rules for classification: 1) Points; 2) Head-to-Head points; 3) Head-to-Head goal difference; 4) Head-to-Head goals scored; 5) Head-to-Head away goals scored; 6) Goal difference; 7) Goals scored (Note: Head-to-head record is used only after all the matches between the teams in question have been played).

==== Results summary ====
Overall								Home						Away					
Pld	W	D	L	GF	GA	GD	Pts	W	D	L	GF	GA	GD	W	D	L	GF	GA	GD
34	10	10	14	39	46	−7	40	2	6	9	18	27	−9	8	4	5	21	19	+2

Last updated: 21 May 2019.
Source: Soccerway

==== Results by round ====
Round	1	2	3	4	5	6	7	8	9	10	11	12	13	14	15	16	17	18	19	20	21	22	23	24	25	26	27	28	29	30	31	32	33	34
Ground	A	H	A	H	A	H	A	H	A	H	A	H	A	H	H	A	H	H	A	H	A	H	A	H	A	H	A	H	A	H	A	A	H	A
Result	D	L	L	L	D	L	W	L	W	L	W	L	W	D	D	L	L	D	W	L	L	L	L	W	W	D	W	D	L	W	D	D	D	W
Position	7	17	18	18	18	18	17	18	15	16	13	14	10	10	10	14	15	13	10	17	17	17	18	15	12	13	12	11	13	11	12	12	12	10

Source: Soccerway
A = Away; H = Home; W = Win; D = Draw; L = Loss

==== Matches ====
1 August 2018 1	El Dakhleya	1–1	Wadi Degla	Cairo
16:00 CAT (UTC+2)	Ragab 36'	Report	Ndiaye 38' (pen.)	Stadium: Police Academy Stadium; Referee: Mohamed Abou Khater

6 August 2018 2	Wadi Degla	1–3	El Gouna	Cairo
21:00 CAT (UTC+2)	Azab 90+1'	Report	Roshdi 33'; Shabrawy 53', 76'	Stadium: Cairo Military Academy Stadium; Referee: Mahmoud Bassiouny

10 August 2018 (Note: Wadi Degla v Petrojet match, originally scheduled to be played on 25 August 2018, was played 10 August 2018 to avoid scheduling conflicts.) 4	Wadi Degla	0–2	Petrojet	Cairo
20:00 CAT (UTC+2)		Report	Bekele 38', 42'	Stadium: Cairo Military Academy Stadium; Referee: Tarek Samy

21 August 2018 3	Al Ahly	1–0	Wadi Degla	Cairo
20:00 CAT (UTC+2)	S. Mohsen 80'	Report		Stadium: Al Salam Stadium; Referee: Mohamed El Hanafy

12 September 2018 6	Wadi Degla	1–2	Misr Lel Makkasa	Cairo
21:00 CAT (UTC+2)	Marie 83'	Report	Omran 12'; Traoré 74'	Stadium: Petro Sport Stadium; Referee: Mohamed Salama

19 September 2018 7	Nogoom	0–1	Wadi Degla	Cairo
21:00 CAT (UTC+2)		Report	Salem 67'	Stadium: Petro Sport Stadium; Referee: Said Hamza

24 September 2018 8	Wadi Degla	1–2	ENPPI	Cairo
18:00 CAT (UTC+2)	Marie 78'	Report	M. Bassiouny 39'; Marshall 58'	Stadium: Petro Sport Stadium; Referee: Mahmoud Nagy

28 September 2018 (Note: Al Ittihad v Wadi Degla match, originally scheduled to be played on 2 September 2018, was postponed due to conflicting with Espérance de Tunis v Al Ittihad match in the Arab Club Champions Cup, which was set to be played on the same day. The match was later rescheduled to be played on 28 September 2018.) 5	Al Ittihad	2–2	Wadi Degla	Alexandria
17:00 CAT (UTC+2)	Banahene 9', 75'	Report	Ndiaye 74'; Marie 86'	Stadium: Alexandria Stadium; Referee: Mohamed El Hanafy

3 October 2018 9	Tala'ea El Gaish	1–2	Wadi Degla	Cairo
21:00 CAT (UTC+2)	Rizk 10'	Report	Azab 13'; Mahmoud 15'	Stadium: Gehaz El Reyada Stadium; Referee: Gehad Grisha

7 October 2018 10	Wadi Degla	0–1	Smouha	Cairo
18:00 CAT (UTC+2)		Report	Hassan 46'	Stadium: Petro Sport Stadium; Referee: Ahmed El Ghandour

18 October 2018 11	Al Mokawloon Al Arab	0–1	Wadi Degla	Cairo
21:00 CAT (UTC+2)		Report	Ndiaye 13'	Stadium: Osman Ahmed Osman Stadium; Referee: Tarek Samy

1 November 2018 12	Wadi Degla	2–4	Zamalek	Cairo
20:30 CAT (UTC+2)	Ndiaye 24', 80' (pen.)	Report	Kahraba 31'; Hassan 43'; Alaa 60' (pen.); Obama 63'	Stadium: Petro Sport Stadium; Referee: Mahmoud Ashour

7 November 2018 13	Ismaily	1–3	Wadi Degla	Ismailia
19:30 CAT (UTC+2)	Mendouga 42'	Report	Mo. Reda 3'; El Gabbas 82' (pen.); Mamdouh 85'	Stadium: Ismailia Stadium; Referee: Ibrahim Nour El Din

11 November 2018 14	Wadi Degla	1–1	Al Masry	Cairo
19:30 CAT (UTC+2)	Bouzas 45'	Report	Koffi 40'	Stadium: Petro Sport Stadium; Referee: Gehad Grisha

21 November 2018 15	Wadi Degla	1–1	Pyramids	Cairo
20:00 CAT (UTC+2)	Ndiaye 53'	Report	Salem 19' (o.g.)	Stadium: Petro Sport Stadium; Referee: Mohamed El Sabahy

26 November 2018 16	Haras El Hodoud	4–1	Wadi Degla	Alexandria
14:45 CAT (UTC+2)	Moses 14'; Abdel Khalek 45'; Ashour 78'; Gamal 88' (pen.)	Report	Mamdouh 45+1'	Stadium: Haras El Hodoud Stadium; Referee: Mahmoud Desouky

11 December 2018 17	Wadi Degla	1–2	El Entag El Harby	Cairo
17:00 CAT (UTC+2)	Helal 75'	Report	Helal 7' (o.g.); Ghanam 86'	Stadium: Petro Sport Stadium; Referee: Nader Kamar El Dawla

20 December 2018 18	Wadi Degla	2–2	El Dakhleya	Cairo
19:00 CAT (UTC+2)	Ndiaye 15'; Mahmoud 31'	Report	Abou El Yazid 20'; Agbettor 44'	Stadium: Petro Sport Stadium; Referee: Hossam El Gallad

26 December 2018 (Note: El Gouna v Wadi Degla match, originally scheduled to be played on 14 January 2019, was played on 26 December 2018 to avoid scheduling conflicts.) 19	El Gouna	0–2	Wadi Degla	El Gouna
17:00 CAT (UTC+2)		Report	Helal 79'; Mahmoud 83' (pen.)	Stadium: El Gouna Stadium; Referee: Mohamed El Tabei

28 January 2019 20	Wadi Degla	1–2	Al Ahly	Cairo
20:00 CAT (UTC+2)	Helal 86' (pen.)	Report	El Solia 17'; Maâloul 65'	Stadium: Petro Sport Stadium; Referee: Ahmed El Ghandour

5 February 2019 21	Petrojet	1–0	Wadi Degla	Suez
15:00 CAT (UTC+2)	Abdel Rasoul 59'	Report		Stadium: Suez Stadium; Referee: Sobhy El Amrawy

10 February 2019 22	Wadi Degla	1–3	Al Ittihad	Cairo
18:00 CAT (UTC+2)	Arafat 37'	Report	Kamar 30', 44'; Gedo 85'	Stadium: Petro Sport Stadium; Referee: Mahmoud Ashour

18 February 2019 23	Misr Lel Makkasa	2–1	Wadi Degla	Cairo (Note: Misr Lel Makkasa v Wadi Degla match was played at Osman Ahmed Osman Stadium in Cairo instead of Faiyum Stadium in Faiyum due to pitch status.)
19:00 CAT (UTC+2)	Gaber 46'; Tony 54'	Report	Helal 63'	Stadium: Osman Ahmed Osman Stadium; Referee: Ibrahim Nour El Din

26 February 2019 24	Wadi Degla	2–1	Nogoom	Cairo
20:00 CAT (UTC+2)	Abdel Fattah 21' (o.g.); Hassan 65'	Report	Omoyele 90+1'	Stadium: Petro Sport Stadium; Referee: Mohamed Adel

3 March 2019 25	ENPPI	1–2	Wadi Degla	Cairo
19:00 CAT (UTC+2)	Bassam 90+5'	Report	Arafat 60'; Yakubu 74'	Stadium: Petro Sport Stadium; Referee: Nader Kamar El Dawla

11 March 2019 26	Wadi Degla	0–0	Tala'ea El Gaish	Cairo
20:00 CAT (UTC+2)		Report		Stadium: Petro Sport Stadium; Referee: Gehad Grisha

29 March 2019 27	Smouha	2–3	Wadi Degla	Alexandria
19:00 CAT (UTC+2)	Nsibambi 52'; Hassan 80'	Report	Ndiaye 21', 63'; Arafat 63'	Stadium: Haras El Hodoud Stadium (Note: Smouha v Wadi Degla match was played at Haras El Hodoud Stadium instead of Borg El Arab Stadium due to pitch status.); Referee: Tarek Magdy

6 April 2019 28	Wadi Degla	0–0	Al Mokawloon Al Arab	Cairo
17:30 CAT (UTC+2)		Report		Stadium: Petro Sport Stadium; Referee: Ahmed El Ghandour

25 April 2019 30	Wadi Degla	3–0	Ismaily	Cairo
17:00 CAT (UTC+2)	Arafat 14', 24'; Ndiaye 65'	Report		Stadium: Petro Sport Stadium; Referee: Mohamed El Hanafy

30 April 2019 31	Al Masry	0–0	Wadi Degla	Suez (Note: Al Masry v Wadi Degla match was played at the Egyptian Army Stadium in Suez instead of Al Masry Club Stadium in Port Said due to security concerns.)
20:00 CAT (UTC+2)		Report		Stadium: Egyptian Army Stadium; Referee: Ibrahim Nour El Din

9 May 2019 (Note: Zamalek v Wadi Degla match, originally scheduled to be played on 14 April 2019, was postponed due to conflicting with Zamalek v Hassania Agadir match in the CAF Confederation Cup, which was set to be played on the same day. The match was later rescheduled to be played on 9 May 2019.) 29	Zamalek	2–1	Wadi Degla	Cairo
22:00 CAT (UTC+2)	El Said 22'; Alaa 48' (pen.)	Report	Helal 66'	Stadium: Petro Sport Stadium; Referee: Tihomir Pejin (Croatia)

14 May 2019 32	Pyramids	1–1	Wadi Degla	Cairo
22:00 CAT (UTC+2)	Traoré 66'	Report	Helal 9'	Stadium: 30 June Stadium; Referee: Roberto García Orozco (Mexico)

21 May 2019 33	Wadi Degla	1–1	Haras El Hodoud	Cairo
22:00 CAT (UTC+2)	Helal 15'	Report	Ashour 81'	Stadium: Osman Ahmed Osman Stadium (Note: Wadi Degla v Haras El Hodoud match was played at Osman Ahmed Osman Stadium instead of Petro Sport Stadium due to unavailability.); Referee: Matej Jug (Slovenia)

3 June 2019 34	El Entag El Harby	1–2	Wadi Degla	Cairo
22:00 CAT (UTC+2)	Ahmed Magdy 87'		Mohamed Helal 27' (pen.); Ibrahima Ndiaye 63'	Stadium: Police Academy Stadium (Note: El Entag El Harby v Wadi Degla match will be played at Police Academy Stadium instead of Al Salam Stadium due to maintenance.)

=== Egypt Cup ===
10 October 2018 Round of 32	Wadi Degla	4–1	El Gouna	Cairo
17:00 CAT (UTC+2)	Helal 8'; Gamal 19', 84'; Mamdouh 59'	Report	Magdy 38' (pen.)	Stadium: Petro Sport Stadium; Referee: Ibrahim Nour El Din

24 October 2018 Round of 16	Misr Lel Makkasa	2–1	Wadi Degla	Alexandria (Note: Starting from round of 16, all matches will be played on stadiums selected by the Egyptian Football Association.)
16:00 CAT (UTC+2)	Voavy 27'; Antwi 36'	Report	Mahmoud 88' (pen.)	Stadium: Alexandria Stadium; Referee: Mohamed El Sabahy
