= 2018–19 Egypt Cup =

2019 Egypt Cup
Tournament details
- Country: Egypt
- Dates: 12 August – 3 October 2018 (qualifying competition); 8 October 2018 – 8 September 2019 (main competition)
- Teams: 262 (overall); 244 (qualifying competition); 32 (main competition)

Final positions
- Champions: Zamalek (27th title)
- Runners-up: Pyramids
- Confederation Cup: Al Masry (Note: Since both finalists qualified to an African competition based on their league rankings, the spot awarded to the winners (2019–20 CAF Confederation Cup preliminary or first round) was passed to the fourth-placed team in the league, Al Masry.)

Tournament statistics
- Matches played: 31
- Goals scored: 87 (2.81 per match)
- Top goal scorer(s): John Antwi; Khaled Kamar; Mahmoud Kaoud; Ahmed Raouf; Eric Traoré (3 goals each)

The 2018–19 Egypt Cup was the 87th edition of the oldest recognised football tournament in Africa. It is sponsored by WE, and known as the WE Cup for sponsorship purposes. It started with the First Preliminary Round on 12 August 2018, and concluded with the final on 8 September 2019.

Egyptian Premier League side Zamalek successfully defended their title and defeated Pyramids 3–0 in the final.

== Teams ==
Round	Clubs remaining	Clubs involved	Winners from previous round	New entries this round	Leagues entering at this round
Round of 32	32	32	14	18	Egyptian Premier League
Round of 16	16	16	16	none	none
Quarter-finals	8	8	8	none	none
Semi-finals	4	4	4	none	none
Final	2	2	2	none	none

== Round and draw dates ==
The schedule was as follows.

Phase	Round	Draw date	First match date
Qualifying rounds	First Preliminary Round	6 August 2018	12 August 2018
Qualifying rounds	Second Preliminary Round	27 August 2018	4 September 2018
Qualifying rounds	Third Preliminary Round	10 September 2018	24 September 2018
Qualifying rounds	Fourth Preliminary Round	10 September 2018	29 September 2018
Qualifying rounds	Fifth Preliminary Round	10 September 2018	3 October 2018
Main tournament	Round of 32	4 October 2018	8 October 2018
Main tournament	Round of 16	4 October 2018	23 October 2018
Main tournament	Quarter-finals	4 October 2018	3 January 2019
Main tournament	Semi-finals	4 October 2018	1 September 2019
Main tournament	Final	4 October 2018	8 September 2019

== Format ==
=== Participation ===
The Egypt Cup began with a round of 32 teams. The 18 teams of the Egyptian Premier League, along with the 14 winning teams qualified from the Fifth Preliminary Round of the 2018–19 Egypt Cup qualifying rounds.

=== Draw ===
The draw for the main competition was held at the Egyptian Football Association headquarters in Gezira, Cairo on 4 October 2018 and was broadcast live on ON Sport.

For the first round, the participating teams were split into three pots, the first one contained the three promoted teams from the Egyptian Second Division and the fifteenth placed team in the Egyptian Premier League, the second one contained the other 14 teams of the Egyptian Premier League and the last one contained the 14 teams qualified from the Fifth Preliminary Round.

The draw rules were as follows:

- The defending champions (Zamalek) and the Egyptian Premier League champions (Al Ahly) were placed in different paths, and could face each other only in the final.
- The Egyptian Premier League runners-up and third placed team (Ismaily and Al Masry) were placed in different paths, and could face each other only in the final.
- The three promoted teams from the Egyptian Second Division (El Gouna, Nogoom and Haras El Hodoud) alongside the fifteenth placed team in the Egyptian Premier League (Wadi Degla) were drawn against each other in the first round.

=== Match rules ===
Teams met in one game per round. Matches took place for 90 minutes, with two halves of 45 minutes each. If still tied after regulation, 30 minutes of extra time were played, consisting of two periods of 15 minutes each. If the score was still level after this, the match was decided by a penalty shoot-out. A coin toss decided who took the first penalty. A total of seven players were allowed to be listed on the substitute bench, with up to three substitutions being allowed during regulation.

=== Champion qualification ===
Usually, the winner of the Egypt Cup would earn automatic qualification for the 2019–20 CAF Confederation Cup. If they had already qualified for the CAF Confederation Cup or CAF Champions League through their position in the Egyptian Premier League, then the spot would go to the cup runners-up. If the cup runners-up also qualified for an African competition through their league position, then the spot would be given to the fourth-placed team in the league.

However, since the competition concluded in September 2019 and the 2019–20 CAF Confederation Cup began in August 2019, the winner of this season's edition of the competition did not earn qualification for the CAF Confederation Cup, and the spot awarded to the cup winner was given to the fourth-placed team in the 2018–19 Egyptian Premier League.

== Qualifying rounds ==
All of the competing teams that were not members of the Egyptian Premier League had to compete in the qualifying rounds to secure one of 14 available places in the Round of 32. The qualifying competition began with the First Preliminary Round on 12 August 2018. The final (fifth) qualifying round was played on 3 October 2018.

== Round of 32 ==
The matches were played from 8 October to 2 December 2018. This round included four teams from the Egyptian Third Division, Ittihad El Shorta, MS Minyat Samanoud, Muslim Youths (Qena) and Naser El Fekreia, the lowest ranking sides left in the competition.

All times are CAT (UTC+2).

8 October 2018	El Dakhleya (1)	0–0 (a.e.t.) (0–2 p)	El Mansoura (2)	Abbassia, Cairo
15:00		Report		Stadium: Police Academy Stadium; Referee: Sobhy El Amrawy
	Penalties
	Salama (penalty missed); Abou El Yazid (penalty missed); Zeka (penalty missed); Gaber (penalty missed)		(penalty missed) Osama; (penalty missed) Nagati; (penalty missed) Hassan; (penalty scored) Said; (penalty scored) Fawzy

8 October 2018	El Entag El Harby (1)	2–0	Ittihad El Shorta (3)	Al Salam City, Cairo
15:00	Ragab 29'; Hamdy 52'	Report		Stadium: Al Salam Stadium; Referee: Mohamed Saber

8 October 2018	Ismaily (1)	4–0	Naser El Fekreia (3)	Ismailia
18:00	A. Magdy 36'; El Wahsh 41'; M. Magdy 49'; Naguib 75'	Report		Stadium: Ismailia Stadium; Referee: Mohamed El Tabei

8 October 2018	Al Mokawloon Al Arab (1)	2–0	Ghazl El Mahalla (2)	Nasr City, Cairo
18:00	Hinestroza 7'; Samir 71'	Report		Stadium: Osman Ahmed Osman Stadium; Referee: Nader Kamar El Dawla

9 October 2018	Petrojet (1)	6–0	MS Tala (2)	Suez
15:00	Salem 61', 74'; Raouf 67', 72' (pen.); Fawzy 90+1' (pen.); Malhat 90+5' (o.g.)	Report		Stadium: Suez Stadium; Referee: Hesham El Fallal

9 October 2018	ENPPI (1)	3–0	Muslim Youths (Qena) (3)	New Cairo, Cairo
18:00	Sadaoui 10'; Kaoud 31', 34'	Report		Stadium: Petro Sport Stadium; Referee: Hosny Sultan

9 October 2018	Pyramids (1)	3–2	Tanta (2)	Nasr City, Cairo
21:00	Keno 34', 55'; Magdy 71' (pen.)	Report	El Sayed 2'; Abdel Rahman 58' (pen.)	Stadium: 30 June Stadium; Referee: Ahmed Abdallah

10 October 2018	Al Ahly (1)	3–2	Tersana (2)	Al Salam City, Cairo
17:00	Sherif 37', 71'; El Sheikh 89'	Report	Ragab 4'; Tarek 64'	Stadium: Al Salam Stadium; Referee: Mahmoud Ashour

10 October 2018	Wadi Degla (1)	4–1	El Gouna (1)	New Cairo, Cairo
17:00	Helal 8'; Gamal 19', 84'; Mamdouh 59'	Report	Magdy 38' (pen.)	Stadium: Petro Sport Stadium; Referee: Ibrahim Nour El Din

10 October 2018	Misr Lel Makkasa (1)	2–0	Abou Qir Fertilizers (2)	Nasr City, Cairo
20:00	Traoré 16'; Wahid 45+2'	Report		Stadium: Osman Ahmed Osman Stadium; Referee: Mohamed Abbas

11 October 2018	Nogoom (1)	1–3 (a.e.t.)	Haras El Hodoud (1)	Nasr City, Cairo
15:00	Abdel Halim 69'	Report	Moses 17', 98'; Gamal 114' (pen.)	Stadium: Osman Ahmed Osman Stadium; Referee: Mahmoud Desouky

11 October 2018	Smouha (1)	3–2	Al Aluminium (2)	Borg El Arab, Alexandria
15:05	Hassan 15', 24'; Farid 90+4'	Report	Milad 80'; Saleh 90+5'	Stadium: Borg El Arab Stadium; Referee: Ibrahim Mahgoub

11 October 2018	Tala'ea El Gaish (1)	3–2	El Qanah (2)	Nasr City, Cairo
18:00	Samir 14' (pen.); Kabouria 42'; N'Diaye 88' (pen.)	Report	Charley 2'; Nabil 60'	Stadium: Gehaz El Reyada Stadium; Referee: Mohamed El Qelawi

11 October 2018	Al Ittihad (1)	3–1	Porto Suez (2)	Shatby, Alexandria
18:00	Banahene 9'; Kamar 55', 70'	Report	El Ghazaly 7'	Stadium: Alexandria Stadium; Referee: Mahmoud Roushdy

11 October 2018	Zamalek (1)	1–0	MS Minyat Samanoud (3)	New Cairo, Cairo
21:00	Hassan 83'	Report		Stadium: Petro Sport Stadium; Referee: Abdel Aziz El Sayed

2 December 2018 (Note: Al Masry v Al Jazeera match, originally scheduled to be played on 9 October 2018 at Al Masry Club Stadium in Port Said, was postponed due to security reasons. The Egyptian Football Association later announced that the match will be played on 16 October 2018. However the EFA postponed the match again on 15 October 2018, and said that they believe that Al Masry's home stadium is still "unsafe" and not ready yet to host local matches; even though Al Masry played all of their 2018 CAF Confederation Cup home matches at that stadium. Al Masry Club Stadium (which was known as Port Said Stadium until 2017) was closed in February 2012 after the incidents of Port Said Stadium riot occurred following a league match between Al Masry and Al Ahly, which resulted in the death 72 Al Ahly fans, 1 Al Masry fan and 1 police officer. On 15 November 2018, the EFA announced that the match will be played on 2 December 2018 in either Ismailia or Port Said.)	Al Masry (1)	1–2	Al Jazeera (2)	Ismailia
17:00	Moussa 21' (pen.)	Report	Khalil 59' (pen.); Refaat 90+4'	Stadium: Ismailia Stadium; Referee: Amr Ayed

== Round of 16 ==
The matches were played from 23 October 2018 to 17 August 2019. This round included two teams from the Egyptian Second Division, Al Jazeera and El Mansoura, the lowest ranking sides left in the competition.

All times are CAT (UTC+2).

23 October 2018	Ismaily (1)	1–0	Al Mokawloon Al Arab (1)	Al Salam City, Cairo
15:00	Bambo 82'	Report		Stadium: Al Salam Stadium; Referee: Mohamed Adel

23 October 2018	Zamalek (1)	2–0 (a.e.t.)	El Entag El Harby (1)	Borg El Arab, Alexandria
18:00	Alaa 102' (pen.); Abdel Aziz 108'	Report		Stadium: Borg El Arab Stadium; Referee: Ahmed El Ghandour

24 October 2018	Misr Lel Makkasa (1)	2–1	Wadi Degla (1)	Shatby, Alexandria
16:00	Voavy 27'; Antwi 36'	Report	Mahmoud 88' (pen.)	Stadium: Alexandria Stadium; Referee: Mohamed El Sabahy

24 October 2018	Tala'ea El Gaish (1)	0–0 (a.e.t.) (3–5 p)	Haras El Hodoud (1)	New Cairo, Cairo
20:00		Report		Stadium: Petro Sport Stadium; Referee: Mahmoud El Banna
	Penalties
	N'Diaye (penalty scored); Youssef (penalty scored); Kabouria (penalty missed); Amoury (penalty scored)		(penalty scored) Gamal; (penalty scored) El Sheikh; (penalty scored) Samy; (penalty scored) Abdel Fattah; (penalty scored) Saad

27 October 2018	ENPPI (1)	4–2	El Mansoura (2)	Nasr City, Cairo
17:00	E. Fathy 10'; Sabry 17' (pen.); Sadaoui 21'; Kaoud 27'	Report	Abdel Samie 69'; Nagati 75'	Stadium: Osman Ahmed Osman Stadium; Referee: Tarek Magdy

7 December 2018 (Note: Smouha v Al Ittihad match, originally scheduled to be played on 27 October 2018, was postponed due to conflicting with Al Ittihad v Zamalek match in the 2018–19 Arab Club Champions Cup second round, which was set to be played on 27 October 2018. The match was later rescheduled to be played on 7 December 2018.)	Smouha (1)	0–0 (a.e.t.) (2–4 p)	Al Ittihad (1)	Borg El Arab, Alexandria
19:00		Report		Stadium: Borg El Arab Stadium; Referee: Mohamed Maarouf
	Penalties
	Ezzat (penalty scored); Manga (penalty missed); Moaz (penalty scored); Y. Ibrahim (penalty missed)		(penalty scored) Koré; (penalty scored) Cissé; (penalty scored) El Sayed; (penalty scored) Gedo

18 December 2018 (Note: Al Jazeera v Petrojet match, originally scheduled to be played on 26 October 2018, was postponed because the two sides were unknown at the time of the match. The match was later rescheduled to be played on 18 December 2018.)	Al Jazeera (2)	1–1 (a.e.t.) (1–4 p)	Petrojet (1)	Nasr City, Cairo
17:00	Refaat 14'	Report	Raouf 8'	Stadium: Osman Ahmed Osman Stadium; Referee: Abdel Aziz El Sayed
	Penalties
	Ragab (penalty missed); Khalil (penalty scored); Ebeid (penalty missed)		(penalty scored) Raouf; (penalty scored) Sobhi; (penalty scored) Mao; (penalty scored) Eid

17 August 2019 (Note: Al Ahly v Pyramids match, originally scheduled to be played on 25 October 2018, was postponed due to conflicting with Al Ahly v ES Sétif match in the 2018 CAF Champions League semi-final, which was set to be played on 23 October 2018. The match was later rescheduled to be played on 28 February 2019. However on 26 February 2019, the EFA decided do postpone all Egypt Cup matches set to be played during the month due to security concerns. The match was later once again rescheduled to be played on 17 August 2019.)	Al Ahly (1)	0–1	Pyramids (1)	Borg El Arab, Alexandria
20:00		Report	Traoré 55'	Stadium: Borg El Arab Stadium; Referee: Gehad Grisha

== Quarter-finals ==
The matches were played from 3 January to 30 August 2019.

All times are CAT (UTC+2).

3 January 2019	Petrojet (1)	2–1 (a.e.t.)	ENPPI (1)	Nasr City, Cairo
16:00	Mao 89', 95'	Report	Bassam 49'	Stadium: Osman Ahmed Osman Stadium; Referee: Walid Abdel Aziz

5 May 2019 (Note: Ismaily v Al Ittihad match, originally scheduled to be played on 2 April 2019, was postponed due to security concerns. The match was later rescheduled to be played on 5 May 2019.)	Ismaily (1)	1–3 (a.e.t.)	Al Ittihad (1)	Nasr City, Cairo
17:00	Bambo 81'	Report	Cissé 84'; Anwar 103'; Kamar 108'	Stadium: Osman Ahmed Osman Stadium; Referee: Ahmed El Ghandour

28 August 2019 (Note: Zamalek v Misr Lel Makkasa match, originally scheduled to be played on 27 February 2019, was postponed due to security concerns. The match was later rescheduled to be played on 28 August 2019.)	Zamalek (1)	1–0	Misr Lel Makkasa (1)	Borg El Arab, Alexandria
20:00	Gomaa 10'	Report		Stadium: Borg El Arab Stadium; Referee: Mohamed Maarouf

30 August 2019	Pyramids (1)	2–0	Haras El Hodoud (1)	New Cairo, Cairo
20:00	Antwi 48' (pen.), 69'	Report		Stadium: Petro Sport Stadium; Referee: Mohamed El Hanafy

== Semi-finals ==
The matches were played on 1 and 2 September 2019.

All times are CAT (UTC+2).

1 September 2019	Zamalek (1)	1–0 (a.e.t.)	Al Ittihad (1)	Ismailia
20:00	Mostafa 99'	Report		Stadium: Ismailia Stadium; Referee: Aliyar Aghayev (Azerbaijan)

2 September 2019	Pyramids (1)	2–0	Petrojet (1)	New Cairo, Cairo
20:00	Traoré 16'; Hassan 44'	Report		Stadium: Petro Sport Stadium; Referee: Mahmoud Ashour

== Final ==
8 September 2019
20:00 CAT

Pyramids	0–3	Zamalek
	Report	Obama 52'; Bencharki 63', 83'

Borg El Arab Stadium, Alexandria
Attendance: 20,000
Referee: Radu Petrescu (Romania)

== Bracket ==
The following is the bracket which the Egypt Cup resembled. Numbers in parentheses next to the match score represent the results of a penalty shoot-out.

Round of 32; 8 October – 2 December 2018
Al Ahly	3
Tersana	2
Pyramids	3
Tanta	2
Tala'ea El Gaish	3
El Qanah	2
Nogoom	1
Haras El Hodoud (a.e.t.)	3
Al Masry	1
Al Jazeera	2
Petrojet	6
MS Tala	0
ENPPI	3
Muslim Youths (Qena)	0
El Dakhleya	0 (0)
El Mansoura (p)	0 (2)
Zamalek	1
MS Minyat Samanoud	0
El Entag El Harby	2
Ittihad El Shorta	0
Misr Lel Makkasa	2
Abou Qir Fertilizers	0
Wadi Degla	4
El Gouna	1
Ismaily	4
Naser El Fekreia	0
Al Mokawloon Al Arab	2
Ghazl El Mahalla	0
Smouha	3
Al Aluminium	2
Al Ittihad	3
Porto Suez	1

Round of 16; 23 October 2018 – 17 August 2019
Al Ahly	0
Pyramids	1
Tala'ea El Gaish	0 (3)
Haras El Hodoud (p)	0 (5)
Al Jazeera	1 (1)
Petrojet (p)	1 (4)
ENPPI	4
El Mansoura	2
Zamalek (a.e.t.)	2
El Entag El Harby	0
Misr Lel Makkasa	2
Wadi Degla	1
Ismaily	1
Al Mokawloon Al Arab	0
Smouha	0 (2)
Al Ittihad (p)	0 (4)

Quarter-finals; 3 January – 30 August 2019
Pyramids	2
Haras El Hodoud	0
Petrojet (a.e.t.)	2
ENPPI	1
Zamalek	1
Misr Lel Makkasa	0
Ismaily	1
Al Ittihad (a.e.t.)	3

Semi-finals; 1–2 September 2019
Pyramids	2
Petrojet	0
Zamalek (a.e.t.)	1
Al Ittihad	0

Final; 8 September 2019
Pyramids	0
Zamalek	3

== Top goalscorers ==
The following are the top scorers of the Egypt Cup, sorted first by number of goals, and then alphabetically if necessary. Goals scored in penalty shoot-outs are not included.

Rank	Player	Club	Goals
1	(Ghana) John Antwi (Note: John Antwi transferred from Misr Lel Makkasa to Pyramids during the 2019 summer transfer window.)	Misr Lel Makkasa/Pyramids	3
1	(Egypt) Khaled Kamar	Al Ittihad	3
1	(Egypt) Mahmoud Kaoud	ENPPI	3
1	(Egypt) Ahmed Raouf (Note: Ahmed Raouf transferred from Petrojet to El Entag El Harby during the 2018–19 winter transfer window.)	Petrojet/El Entag El Harby	3
1	(Burkina Faso) Eric Traoré (Note: Eric Traoré transferred from Misr Lel Makkasa to Pyramids during the 2018–19 winter transfer window.)	Misr Lel Makkasa/Pyramids	3
6	(Egypt) Karim Bambo	Ismaily	2
6	(Morocco) Achraf Bencharki (Note: Achraf Bencharki transferred from Al Hilal to Zamalek during the 2019 summer transfer window.)	Zamalek	2
6	(Egypt) Mohamed Gamal	Wadi Degla	2
6	(Egypt) Hossam Hassan	Smouha	2
6	(Egypt) Ibrahim Hassan (Note: Ibrahim Hassan transferred from Zamalek to Pyramids during the 2019 summer transfer window.)	Zamalek/Pyramids	2
6	(Brazil) Keno	Pyramids	2
6	(Tanzania) Himid Mao	Petrojet	2
6	(Nigeria) Edu Moses	Haras El Hodoud	2
6	(Egypt) Ahmed Refaat	Al Jazeera	2
6	(United States) Noah Sadaoui	ENPPI	2
6	(Egypt) Mohamed Salem	Petrojet	2
6	(Egypt) Mohamed Sherif	Al Ahly	2
