= 2022–23 Al Ittihad Alexandria Club season =

Al Ittihad Alexandria Club
2022–23 season
- Chairman: Mohamed Moselhi
- Manager: Zoran Manojlović
- Stadium: Alexandria Stadium
- Egyptian Premier League: 8th
- Egypt Cup: Round of 16
- EFA Cup: Semi-finals
- Top goalscorer: League: Mabululu (16); All: Mabululu (17)

The 2022–23 Al Ittihad Alexandria Club season was the club's 109th season in existence and the 52nd consecutive season in the top flight of Egyptian football. In addition to the domestic league, Al Ittihad participated in this season's editions of the Egypt Cup and the EFA Cup.

== Overview ==
On 6 September, the Al Ittihad Alexandria announced the new coach, Zoran Manojlović, in preparation for the new season.

== Players ==
=== First-team squad ===
Note: Flags indicate national team as defined under FIFA eligibility rules; some limited exceptions apply. Players may hold more than one non-FIFA nationality.

No.	Pos.	Nation	Player
1	GK	EGY	Oussa
3	DF	EGY	Mohamed Magdy
5	DF	EGY	Mohamed Abdelsalam (on loan from Zamalek)
6	DF	EGY	Sabry Raheel
8	MF	EGY	Manga
10	MF	EGY	Khaled El Ghandour (Captain)
11	FW	EGY	Fawzy El Henawy
13	DF	EGY	El Sayed Salem
14	MF	EGY	Ahmed Adel
15	FW	EGY	Karim Mamdouh
16	GK	EGY	Ahmed Yehia
17	DF	EGY	Karim El Deeb
18	MF	GHA	Moro Salifu
19	FW	EGY	Ahmed Heggy

No.	Pos.	Nation	Player
20	MF	EGY	Marwan Attia
22	FW	EGY	Ahmed Rashed
23	FW	EGY	Ahmed Ali
25	MF	EGY	Hossam Ashour
26	FW	ANG	Mabululu
28	MF	BFA	Saïdou Simporé
30	DF	EGY	Marwan El Nagar (3rd captain)
31	DF	JAM	Damion Lowe
32	DF	EGY	Mostafa Ibrahim
34	MF	EGY	Abdel Mohamed
35	DF	EGY	Ragab El Safi
38	MF	EGY	Mohamed Kamel
—	MF	EGY	Nader Ramadan
—	FW	GHA	Benjamin Boateng

== Transfers ==
=== In ===
No.	Pos	Player	Transferred from	Fee	Date	Source
5	DF	(Palestine) Mohammed Saleh	(Egypt) El Qanah	Undisclosed	6 September 2022	
2	MF	(Egypt) Ibrahim Hassan	(Egypt) Pyramids	€158,000	6 September 2022	
15	FW	(Nigeria) Austin Amutu	(Egypt) Al Masry	Free	22 September 2022	
4	DF	(Egypt) Mahmoud Alaa	(Egypt) Zamalek	Loan	4 October 2022	

=== Out ===
No.	Pos	Player	Transferred to	Fee	Date	Source
	DF	(Egypt) Mahmoud Shabana	(Egypt) Zamalek	Loan return	4 October 2022	
20	MF	(Egypt) Marwan Attia	(Egypt) Al Ahly	LE 25,000,000	10 January 2023	
	MF	(Egypt) Naser Naser	(Egypt) ENPPI	Loan	22 January 2023	

== Pre-season and friendlies ==
Win Draw Loss Fixtures

26 September 2022 Friendly	Al Ittihad (Egypt)	4–0	(Egypt) Ashab El-Giyad	Alexandria
		Report

30 September 2022 Friendly	Al Ittihad (Egypt)	0–0	(Egypt) Al Magd	Alexandria
		Report		Stadium: Borg El Arab Stadium

3 October 2022 Friendly	Al Ittihad (Egypt)	2–2	(Egypt) Aswan	Alexandria
		Report		Stadium: Borg El Arab Stadium

4 October 2022 Friendly	Al Ittihad (Egypt)	2–0	(Egypt) Al Etisalat	Alexandria
		Report		Stadium: Borg El Arab Stadium

7 October 2022 Friendly	Al Ittihad (Egypt)	1–0	(Egypt) Smouha	Alexandria
		Report		Stadium: Alexandria Stadium

8 October 2022 Friendly	Al Ittihad (Egypt)	0–0	(Egypt) Smouha	Alexandria
		Report		Stadium: Alexandria Stadium

15 November 2022 Friendly	Amiriya Youth Center (Egypt)	1–3	(Egypt) Al Ittihad	Cairo
15:00 EST (UTC+2)	(pen.)		Simporé; Raheel; Hassan	Stadium: Fuel Stadium

18 November 2022 Friendly	Tala'ea El Gaish (Egypt)	2–0	(Egypt) Al Ittihad	Cairo
	Tarek; El Sharkawy

16 February 2023 Friendly	Al Ittihad (Egypt)	2–2	(Egypt) Sporting
	Mahmoud; Ibrahim	Report	Nabil; Adel

== Competitions ==
=== Overview ===
Competition	First match	Last match	Starting round	Final position	Record							
Competition	First match	Last match	Starting round	Final position	Pld	W	D	L	GF	GA	GD	Win %
Egyptian Premier League	18 October 2022	15 July 2023	Matchday 1	8th	34	12	7	15	36	43	−7	35.29
Egypt Cup	9 May 2023	22 June 2023	Round of 32	Round of 16	2	1	0	1	2	1	+1	50.00
EFA Cup	20 March 2023	26 June 2023	Round of 16	Semi-finals	3	1	2	0	5	4	+1	33.33
Total					39	14	9	16	43	48	−5	35.90

Source: Soccerway

=== Egyptian Premier League ===
==== League table ====
Pos	Team	Pld	W	D	L	GF	GA	GD	Pts
6	ENPPI	34	13	6	15	34	40	−6	45
7	Al Mokawloon Al Arab	34	9	17	8	35	33	+2	44
8	Al Ittihad	34	12	7	15	36	43	−7	43
9	Pharco	34	9	15	10	31	34	−3	42 (Note: Head-to-head points: Pharco 6, Smouha 0.)
10	Smouha	34	10	12	12	36	43	−7	42

Source: Soccerway
Rules for classification: 1) Points; 2) Head-to-head points; 3) Head-to-head goal difference; 4) Goal difference; 5) Goals scored; 6) Play-off.

==== Results summary ====
Overall								Home						Away					
Pld	W	D	L	GF	GA	GD	Pts	W	D	L	GF	GA	GD	W	D	L	GF	GA	GD
32	12	6	14	35	39	−4	42	7	3	6	17	14	+3	5	3	8	18	25	−7

Last updated: 8 July 2023.
Source: worldfootball

==== Results by round ====
Round	1	2	3	4	5	6	7	8	9	10	11	12	13	14	15	16	17	18	19	20	21	22	23	24	25	26	27	28	29	30	31	32	33	34
Ground	A	H	H	A	H	A	H	A	H	A	H	A	H	A	H	A	H	H	A	A	H	A	H	A	H	A	H	A	H	A	H	A	H	A
Result	W	W	W	L	L	L	W	W	W	L	L	L	D	W	W	D	D	W	W	W	L	L	L	L	W	D	L	L	L	L	D	D		
Position	4	2	1	4	5	6	6	6	4	6	6	6	7	6	6	6	6	6	4	4		4	5											

Updated to match(es) played on 8 July 2023. Source: worldfootball
A = Away; H = Home; W = Win; D = Draw; L = Loss

==== Matches ====
The league fixtures were announced on 9 October 2022.

18 October 2022 1	Aswan	0–1	Al Ittihad	Aswan
15:00 EST (UTC+2)		Report	Amutu 85'	Stadium: Aswan Stadium; Referee: Mohamed Maarouf

24 October 2022 2	Al Ittihad	2–0	El Dakhleya	Alexandria
17:00 EST (UTC+2)	Hassan 36'; Amutu 70'	Report		Stadium: Alexandria Stadium; Referee: Walid Abdelrazek

31 October 2022 3	Al Ittihad	3–1	Tala'ea El Gaish	Alexandria
17:00 EST (UTC+2)	Mabululu 68'; Sobhy 79'; Attia 90'	Report	Tarek 25'	Stadium: Alexandria Stadium; Referee: Nader Kamar

30 November 2022 5	Al Ittihad	0–2	Ghazl El Mahalla	Alexandria
19:00 EST (UTC+2)		Report	Voavy 31'; El Sheikh 40'	Stadium: Alexandria Stadium; Referee: Ahmed Ghandour

8 December 2022 6	Future	1–0	Al Ittihad	Cairo
17:00 EST (UTC+2)	El Ouadi 25'	Report		Stadium: Al Salam Stadium; Referee: Mohamed Maarouf

12 December 2022 4	Al Ahly	3–0	Al Ittihad	Cairo
19:00 EST (UTC+2)	Tau 12'; Ibrahim 32'; Tawfik 90'	Report	Alaa (penalty missed) 45+1'; Elkalamawy (penalty missed) 48'	Stadium: Al Ahly WE Al Salam Stadium; Referee: Mahmoud El Banna

15 December 2022 7	Al Ittihad	1–0	Pharco	Alexandria
17:00 EST (UTC+2)	Mabululu 47'	Report		Stadium: Alexandria Stadium; Referee: Mostafa El Shahdi

19 December 2022 8	Smouha	0–2	Al Ittihad	Alexandria
17:00 EST (UTC+2)		Report	Mabululu 79'; Hassan 90+2'	Stadium: Alexandria Stadium; Referee: Mohamed Adel

23 December 2022 9	Al Ittihad	1–0	Ceramica Cleopatra	Borg El Arab
17:00 EST (UTC+2)	Abdel Naby 2'	Report		Stadium: Borg El Arab Stadium; Referee: Hesham El Kady

27 December 2022 10	Pyramids	3–0	Al Ittihad	Cairo
17:00 EST (UTC+2)	Sobhi (penalty missed) 39'; Galal 45+3'; Lakay 58'; Saleh 85' (o.g.)	Report		Stadium: 30 June Stadium; Referee: Mohammed Yousef

2 January 2023 11	Al Ittihad	1–2	ENPPI	Alexandria
17:00 EST (UTC+2)	Mabululu 84'	Report	Aoufa 32'; Kabou 67'	Stadium: Alexandria Stadium; Referee: Mahmoud Nagi

7 January 2023 12	Al Masry	2–1	Al Ittihad	Borg El Arab
19:00 EST (UTC+2)	Jelassi 44' (pen.); Hamdi 74', (yellow card) 86'; Ali (yellow card) 77'; Deghmoum (yellow card) 90+4'	Report	Naseeb 59'; Amutu (yellow card) 54'	Stadium: Borg El Arab Stadium; Referee: Mohamed Maarouf

11 January 2023 13	Al Ittihad	0–0	Zamalek	Borg El Arab
19:00 EST (UTC+2)	Abdel Aziz (yellow card) 19'; Saleh (yellow card) 79'	Report		Stadium: Borg El Arab Stadium; Referee: Ibrahim Nour El Din

19 January 2023 14	National Bank	2–3	Al Ittihad	Cairo
16:45 EST (UTC+2)	Yassin (yellow card) 35'; Tawfik 40'; Yassin (yellow card) 44'; Salifu 45+3' (o.g.)	Report	Mabululu 52'; Alaa 66'; Amutu 89'	Stadium: Cairo International Stadium; Referee: Mohamed Al Kalawy

23 January 2023 15	Al Ittihad	1–0	Haras El Hodoud	Alexandria
19:00 EST (UTC+2)	Amutu (yellow card) 69'; Alaa 84' (pen.)	Report	Ziko (yellow card) 82'; Sami (yellow card) 82'	Stadium: Alexandria Stadium; Referee: Nader Kamar

27 January 2023 16	Al Mokawloon Al Arab	0–0	Al Ittihad	Cairo
19:00 EST (UTC+2)	El Sayed (yellow card) 39'	Report	Mohamed (yellow card) 80'	Stadium: Osman Ahmed Osman Stadium; Referee: Mohamed Al Ghazi

5 February 2023 17	Al Ittihad	1–1	Ismaily	Borg El Arab
19:00 EST (UTC+2)	Alaa 76'	Report	El Shamy 1'	Stadium: Borg El Arab Stadium; Referee: Mohammad Sabahi

9 February 2023 18	Al Ittihad	2–0	Aswan	Borg El Arab
14:45 EST (UTC+2)	Hassan 51'; Mabululu 63'	Report		Stadium: Borg El Arab Stadium; Referee: Ibrahim Ghuloum Mohamed (United Arab Emirates)

20 February 2023 19	El Dakhleya	1–2	Al Ittihad	Suez
17:00 EST (UTC+2)	John 69'	Report	Alaa 25'; Abdel Naby 90+6'	Stadium: Suez Stadium; Referee: Mohamed El Hanafi

27 February 2023 20	Tala'ea El Gaish	3–4	Al Ittihad	Cairo
19:00 EST (UTC+2)	Tarek 27'; Wadi 64'; Mohareb 78'	Report	Mabululu 13', 35' (pen.), 45'; El Ghandour 74'	Stadium: Gehaz El Reyada Stadium; Referee: Amin Omar

31 March 2023 22	Ghazl El Mahalla	2–0	Al Ittihad	El Mahalla El Kubra
21:15 EST (UTC+2)	Ekpenyong 22'; Morsi 89'	Report		Stadium: Ghazl El Mahalla Stadium; Referee: Tarek Magdy

6 April 2023 23	Al Ittihad	0–1	Future	Alexandria
21:15 EST (UTC+2)		Report	Mohsen 64'	Stadium: Alexandria Stadium; Referee: Mabrouk Nabil

10 April 2023 24	Pharco	3–2	Al Ittihad	Borg El Arab
21:15 EST (UTC+2)	Hamroune 22'; Baheeg 65'; Nagib 81'	Report	Mabululu 90+2', 90+4'	Stadium: Borg El Arab Stadium; Referee: Mohamed Al Kalawy

14 April 2023 25	Al Ittihad	3–1	Smouha	Alexandria
21:15 EST (UTC+2)	Mabululu 6', 81'; Elkalamawy 89'	Report	Emara 89'	Stadium: Alexandria Stadium; Referee: Mostafa El Shahdi

20 April 2023 26	Ceramica Cleopatra	0–0	Al Ittihad	Cairo
21:15 EST (UTC+2)		Report		Stadium: Al Salam Stadium; Referee: Mostafa Osman

15 May 2023 28	ENPPI	1–0	Al Ittihad	Cairo
21:30 EST (UTC+3)	Aoufa 56'	Report		Stadium: Petrosport Stadium; Referee: Mahmoud El Banna

22 May 2023 29	Al Ittihad	1–2	Al Masry	Borg El Arab
19:00 EST (UTC+3)	Mabululu 25'	Report	Grendo 34' (pen.); Jelassi 73' (pen.)	Stadium: Borg El Arab Stadium; Referee: Mohamed Al Ghazi

29 May 2023 27	Al Ittihad	1–2	Pyramids	Alexandria
18:00 EST (UTC+3)	Hamdi 22'	Report	Adel 19'; Lakay 71'	Stadium: Alexandria Stadium; Referee: Abdelaziz El Sayed
Note: The game, which was initially slated for 25 April 2023, was postponed. Rescheduled for 5 May but postponed again due to the 2021–22 Super Cup.

5 June 2023 30	Zamalek	2–1	Al Ittihad	Cairo
20:00 EST (UTC+3)	Jaziri 23', 49'	Report	El Ghandour 65'	Stadium: Cairo International Stadium; Referee: Amin Omar

9 June 2023 31	Al Ittihad	0-0	National Bank	Alexandria
20:00 EST (UTC+3)		Report		Stadium: Alexandria Stadium; Referee: Mahmoud Nagi (Egypt)

8 July 2023 21	Al Ittihad	v	Al Ahly	Alexandria
19:00 EST (UTC+2)				Stadium: Alexandria Stadium
Note: The game, which was initially slated for 11 March 2023, was postponed due to Al Ahly's involvement in the CAF Champions League.

=== Egypt Cup ===
9 May 2023 Round of 32	Al Ittihad	2–0 (a.e.t.)	El Sekka El Hadid	Alexandria
21:00 EST (UTC+2)	Adal 98' (o.g.); Hassan 118'			Stadium: Alexandria Stadium; Referee: Amr Al-Attar

22 June 2023 Round of 16	Al Ittihad	0–1	Pyramids	Alexandria
18:30 EST (UTC+3)			Ben Youssef 90+6'	Stadium: Alexandria Stadium; Referee: Mohamed Youssef

=== EFA Cup ===
20 March 2023 Round of 16	Al Ittihad	2–2 (a.e.t.) (7–6 p)	Pharco	Alexandria
19:00 EST (UTC+2)	Elkalamawy 48'; Mahmoud 72'		Emad 43' (pen.); Sabri (penalty missed) 90+7'; Sokari 90+7'	Stadium: Alexandria Stadium

28 April 2023 Quarter-finals	Al Ittihad	3–2	ENPPI	Alexandria
19:00 EST (UTC+3)	Kalosha 63' (o.g.); Mabululu 69'; Adel 71'		Kalosha 53'; Aoufa 81'	Stadium: Alexandria Stadium; Referee: Mahmoud Rushdi

26 June 2023 Semi-finals	Ceramica Cleopatra	0–0 (4–3 p)	Al Ittihad	Cairo
20:30 EST (UTC+3)				Stadium: Cairo International Stadium; Referee: Wael Farhan
