= 2021–22 Egyptian Premier League =

63rd season of the Egyptian Premier League

Egyptian Premier League
- Season: 2021–22
- Dates: 25 October 2021 – 30 August 2022
- Champions: Zamalek (14th title)
- Relegated: Misr Lel Makkasa; Eastern Company; El Gouna
- Champions League: Zamalek; Al Ahly
- Confederation Cup: Pyramids; Future
- Matches: 306
- Goals: 673 (2.2 per match)
- Top goalscorer: Ahmed Sayed (19 goals)
- Biggest home win: Ceramica Cleopatra 5–0 Al Ittihad (14 July 2022)
- Biggest away win: Ismaily 0–4 Al Ahly (27 October 2021)
- Highest scoring: Smouha 4–4 Al Ittihad (25 October 2021); Zamalek 3–5 Al Ahly (5 November 2021); Al Ittihad 4–4 Ceramica Cleopatra (20 December 2021)
- Longest winning run: 9 matches Zamalek SC
- Longest unbeaten run: 16 matches Tala'ea El Gaish
- Longest winless run: 16 matches Misr Lel Makkasa
- Longest losing run: 6 matches Eastern Company

The 2021–22 Egyptian Premier League, also known as The WE Egyptian Premier League for sponsorship purposes, was the 63rd season of the Egyptian Premier League, the top Egyptian professional league for association football clubs, since its establishment in 1948. The season started on 25 October 2021 and is concluded on 30 August 2022. Fixtures for the 2021–22 season were announced on 12 October 2021.

Zamalek are the defending champions, having won their 13th league title in the previous season.

== Teams ==
Locations of the 2021–22 Egyptian Premier League teams

Eighteen teams are competing in the league - the top fifteen teams from the previous season, and three teams promoted from the Egyptian Second Division.

=== Venues ===
A total of 12 stadiums in 5 governorates were selected by clubs to host their 2021–22 home fixtures. Each club has the option to submit a reserve home venue in case of unavailability for their main home stadium.

Due to security concerns, selected matches are played on neutral ground due to high intensity. For example, fixtures between Al Ahly and Ismaily are played in Alexandria. All matches involving Al Masry are also played in the same city.

Al Ahly	Ceramica Cleopatra	Eastern Company
Al Salam Stadium	Osman Ahmed Osman Stadium	Petro Sport Stadium
Capacity: 30,000	Capacity: 35,000	Capacity: 16,000
ENPPI	Future	Ghazl El Mahalla
Petro Sport Stadium	Al Salam Stadium	Ghazl El Mahalla Stadium
Capacity: 16,000	Capacity: 30,000	Capacity: 14,564
El Gouna	Ismaily	Al Ittihad
Khaled Bichara Stadium	Ismailia Stadium	Alexandria Stadium
Capacity: 12,000	Capacity: 18,525	Capacity: 19,676
Al Masry	Misr Lel Makkasa	Al Mokawloon Al Arab
Borg El Arab Stadium (Note: Al Masry play their home matches at Borg El Arab Stadium in Alexandria, instead of their regular stadium Al Masry Club Stadium in Port Said, which is under demolition process ahead of a redevelopment project.)	Cairo Military Academy Stadium (Note: Misr Lel Makkasa play their home matches at Cairo Military Academy Stadium in Cairo, instead of their regular stadium Faiyum Stadium in Faiyum, due to VAR unavailability.)	Osman Ahmed Osman Stadium
Capacity: 86,000	Capacity: 28,500	Capacity: 35,000
National Bank of Egypt	Pharco	Pyramids
Petro Sport Stadium	Alexandria Stadium	30 June Stadium
Capacity: 16,000	Capacity: 19,676	Capacity: 30,000
Smouha	Tala'ea El Gaish	Zamalek
Alexandria Stadium	Gehaz El Reyada Stadium	Cairo International Stadium
Capacity: 19,676	Capacity: 20,000	Capacity: 75,000

=== Personnel and kits ===
Team	Manager	Captain	Kit manufacturer	Shirt sponsor
Al Ahly	(Portugal) Ricardo Soares	(Egypt) Mohamed El Shenawy	Umbro	WE, SAIB Bank, Royal Dutch Shell^{1}, Tiger Chips^{1}, GLC Paints^{2}
Future FC	(Egypt) Ali Maher	(Egypt) Saad Samir	Nike	Papa John's^{1}
Ceramica Cleopatra	(Egypt) Ahmed Samy	(Egypt) Amer Mohamed	Kelme	Ceramica Cleopatra Group
ENPPI	(Brazil) Jorvan Vieira	(Egypt) Ibrahim Yehia	Nike	WE, Oppo, SAIB Bank, Egyptair
Pharco Fc	(Portugal) Nuno Almeida	(Egypt) Ramy Sabry	Kelme	WE, Oppo, SAIB Bank, Egyptair
Ghazl El Mahalla	(Egypt) Mohamed Odah	(Egypt) Abdo Yehia	Uhlsport	Misr Life Insurance
El Gouna	(Egypt) Reda Shehata	(Egypt) Nour El Sayed	Adidas	Orascom Group
Ismaily	(Egypt) Hamza El-Gamal	(Egypt) Shoukry Naguib	Jako	WE, Oppo, SAIB Bank, Egyptair
Al Ittihad	(Egypt) Emad El Nahhas	(Egypt) Khaled El Ghandour	Xtep	WE, Oppo, SAIB Bank, Egyptair
Al Masry	(Egypt) Hossam Hassan	(Egypt) Amr Moussa	Nike	WE, Oppo, SAIB Bank, Egyptair
Eastern Company	(Egypt) Alaa Abdelaal	(Egypt) Ahmed Temsah	Umbro	
Al Mokawloon	(Egypt) Mohamed Ouda	(Egypt) Mohamed Hamdy Zaky	Kelme	Arab Contractors
El Geish	(Egypt) [[]]	(Egypt) Mohamed Bassam	Adidas	WE, Oppo, Egyptair
Misr El Makassa	(Egypt) Eid Maraziq	(Egypt) Hossam Abdel Wahed	Joma	WE, Oppo, SAIB Bank, Egyptair, Misr Life Insurance
National Bank of Egypt	(Egypt) Khaled Galal	(Egypt) Asem Salah	Kelme	National Bank of Egypt
Pyramids	(Egypt) Ehab Galal	(Egypt) Abdallah El Said	Puma	Whoosh
Smouha	(Egypt) Abdel Hamid Bassiouny	(Egypt) Mahmoud Abdelhalim	Adidas	
Zamalek	(Portugal) Jesualdo Ferreira	(Egypt) Shikabala	Tempo sport	Molto, Oppo, SAIB Bank, Egyptair, Misr Life Insurance

=== Managerial changes ===
Club	Previous Manager	New Manager
Ismaily SC	(Egypt) Talaat Youssef	(Argentina) Juan Brown
Eastern Company SC	(Egypt) Alaa Nouh	(Egypt) Alaa Abdel Aal
Pharco FC	(Egypt) Magdy Abdelaty	(Portugal) Nuno Almeida
Ismaily SC	(Argentina) Juan Brown	(Egypt) Hamza El-Gamal
Al Ittihad Alexandria	(Egypt) Hossam Hassan	(Egypt) Emad El Nahhas
Al Mokawloon Al Arab	(Egypt) Emad El Nahhas	(Egypt) Mohamed Ouda
Smouha SC	(Egypt) Ahmed Samy	(Egypt) Abdel Hamid Bassiouny
Misr El Makasa	(Egypt) Tamer Mostafa	(Egypt) Eid Maraziq
Al Masry SC	(Tunisia) Moïne Chaâbani	(Egypt) Hossam Hassan
ENPPI SC	(Egypt) Helmi Toulan	(Brazil) Jorvan Vieira
Al Ahly SC	(South Africa) Pitso Mosimane	(Portugal) Ricardo Soares

=== Foreign players ===
Club	1st	2nd	3rd	4th	5th	6th	Loaned Out
Al Ahly SC	(Tunisia) Ali Maâloul	(Mali) Aliou Dieng	(Morocco) Badr Benoun	(Mozambique) Luís Miquissone	(South Africa) Percy Tau		(Senegal) Aliou Badji (Democratic Republic of the Congo) Walter Bwalya
Al Ittihad Alexandria	(Jamaica) Damion Lowe	(Burkina Faso) Saïdou Simporé	(Ghana) Moro Salifu	(Angola) Mabululu	(Ghana) Benjamin Boateng	(Jordan) Abdullah Naseeb	
Al Masry SC	(Nigeria) Emeka Ezeugo	(Nigeria) Austin Amutu	(Tunisia) Ilies Jelassi				
Al Mokawloon Al Arab	(Colombia) Luis Hinestroza	(Burkina Faso) Farouck Kabore	(Mauritania) Mamadou Niass	(Tunisia) Oussama Romdhani	(Nigeria) John Okoli		
Cleopatra FC	(Ghana) Evans Mensah	(Ghana) Kwame Bonsu	(Tunisia) Seif Teka	(Cameroon) Fabrice Ngah	(Tunisia) Bilel Saidani	(Palestine) Musab Al-Battat	
Eastern Company	(Ghana) Stephen Sey	(Ghana) Benjamin Afutu	(Tunisia) Firas Iffia	(Tunisia) Mohamed Trabelsi			
Tala'ea El Gaish	(Gabon) Franck Engonga	(Democratic Republic of the Congo) Kazadi Kasengu	(Ghana) John Antwi	(Tunisia) Mohamed Jouini	(Morocco) Khalid Hachadi		
El Gouna FC	(Uganda) Allan Kyambadde	(Ethiopia) Shimelis Bekele					
ENPPI SC	(Nigeria) John Okoye Ebuka	(Nigeria) Dinopeter Judy					
Future FC	(Cameroon) Jonathan Ngwem	(Madagascar) Anicet Abel	(Tunisia) Ayman Sfaxi	(Ghana) Diawisie Taylor			
Ghazl El Mahalla	(Ivory Coast) Ibrahim Koné	(Madagascar) Paulin Voavy	(Mali) Malick Touré	(Tanzania) Himid Mao			
Ismaily SC	(Namibia) Benson Shilongo	(Tunisia) Marouane Sahraoui	(Libya) Mohamed Tarhoni	(Zambia) Justin Shonga			(Angola) Ary Papel
Misr Lel Makkasa	(Kenya) John Avire	(Ivory Coast) Eric Serge	(Nigeria) Joseph Atola	(Cameroon) David Cameron			
National Bank of Egypt	(Tunisia) Mohamed Methnani	(Ghana) Issah Yakubu	(Nigeria) Maarouf Youssef	(Guinea) Moussa Diawara			
Pharco FC	(Tunisia) Azmi Ghouma	(Sudan) Seif Teiri	(Nigeria) Kingsley Sokari	(Algeria) Rezki Hamroune			
Pyramids FC	(Burkina Faso) Eric Traoré	(Palestine) Mahmoud Wadi	(Tunisia) Fakhreddine Ben Youssef	(Morocco) Walid El Karti			(Ghana) John Antwi
Smouha SC	(Morocco) Abdelkabir El Ouadi	(Sudan) Ather El Tahir	(Mali) Sikiru Olatunbosun	(Guinea) Alia Sylla	(Nigeria) Sodiq Ougola	(Angola) Garcia Dasfaa	
Zamalek SC	(Morocco) Achraf Bencharki	(Morocco) Mohamed Ounajem	(Tunisia) Hamza Mathlouthi	(Tunisia) Seifeddine Jaziri	(Ivory Coast) Razzak Cisse		

== Results ==
=== League table ===
Pos	Team	Pld	W	D	L	GF	GA	GD	Pts	Qualification or relegation
1	Zamalek (Note: The 2021–22 Egyptian Premier League was not finished by the CAF deadline. As a result, the Egyptian Football Association announced that Zamalek and Al Ahly, who were at first and second place after 24 rounds respectively, represented Egypt in the 2022–23 CAF Champions League. Meanwhile, Future and Pyramids FC, who were at third and fourth place after 24 rounds respectively, represented Egypt in the 2022–23 CAF Confederation Cup.) (C)	34	24	5	5	62	29	+33	77	Qualification for the Champions League
2	Pyramids	34	22	5	7	56	25	+31	71	Qualification for the Confederation Cup
3	Al Ahly	34	20	10	4	62	21	+41	70	Qualification for the Champions League
4	Tala'ea El Gaish	34	14	14	6	27	24	+3	56 (Note: Head-to-Head points: Tala'ea El Gaish 6, Future 0.)	
5	Future	34	16	8	10	49	34	+15	56	Qualification for the Confederation Cup
6	Smouha	34	11	14	9	44	45	−1	47	
7	National Bank of Egypt	34	11	13	10	40	41	−1	46	
8	Pharco	34	9	15	10	21	22	−1	42	
9	ENPPI	34	8	15	11	37	39	−2	39	
10	Al Mokawloon Al Arab	34	8	14	12	30	31	−1	38 (Note: Head-to-Head points: Al Mokawloon Al Arab 12, Ismaily 11, Al Ittihad 5, Al Masry 4.)	
11	Ismaily	34	9	11	14	27	39	−12	38	
12	Al Ittihad	34	9	11	14	40	52	−12	38	
13	Al Masry	34	8	14	12	40	41	−1	38	
14	Ceramica Cleopatra	34	7	16	11	34	41	−7	37	
15	Ghazl El Mahalla	34	7	15	12	26	37	−11	36 (Note: Head-to-Head points: Ghazl El Mahalla 4, El Gouna 1.)	
16	El Gouna (R)	34	9	9	16	33	46	−13	36	Relegation to Second Division
17	Eastern Company (R)	34	7	12	15	33	56	−23	33	Relegation to Second Division
18	Misr Lel Makkasa (R)	34	2	9	23	12	50	−38	15	Relegation to Second Division

Source: Soccerway
Rules for classification: 1) Points; 2) Head-to-Head points; 3) Head-to-Head goal difference; 4) Head-to-Head goals scored; 5) Head-to-Head away goals scored; 6) Goal difference; 7) Goals scored.
(Note: Head-to-head record is used only after all the matches between the teams in question have been played).
(C) Champions; (R) Relegated

=== Fixtures and results ===
Home \ Away	AHL	CCL	EAS	ENP	FUT	GMH	GOU	ISM	ITH	MAS	MMK	MOK	NBE	PHA	PYR	SMO	TGS	ZAM
Al Ahly	—	4–0	4–1	2–0	4–0	2–1	2–0	0–0	1–0	2–0	4–0	1–0	1–0	0–0	3–0	4–1	0–0	2–2
Ceramica Cleopatra	1–1	—	0–1	0–0	0–3	0–0	3–2	2–1	5–0	1–4	4–1	2–2	1–0	1–1	0–2	1–1	1–1	0–1
Eastern Company	0–0	1–0	—	0–2	1–4	2–3	0–2	0–2	2–2	2–2	2–1	1–1	2–3	0–3	0–3	2–2	0–0	1–2
ENPPI	1–2	0–0	1–2	—	1–2	2–2	2–2	2–0	1–0	1–1	0–0	3–2	2–2	0–1	1–1	1–1	0–1	0–2
Future	1–1	1–1	1–1	1–2	—	2–1	3–2	1–2	4–3	1–1	1–0	1–0	2–0	1–0	1–0	4–0	0–1	0–1
Ghazl El Mahalla	2–3	0–0	1–0	3–0	0–0	—	2–1	0–0	1–1	1–1	1–0	1–1	1–1	1–1	0–2	1–0	0–1	0–2
El Gouna	0–0	1–1	2–3	1–1	2–1	0–0	—	0–3	1–0	0–3	0–1	1–2	1–2	1–0	1–2	1–0	2–1	1–4
Ismaily	0–4	2–0	1–1	0–2	0–0	0–0	0–1	—	1–0	3–2	1–0	0–0	2–2	0–0	0–4	1–0	0–1	0–2
Al Ittihad	0–3	4–4	1–1	2–1	3–2	3–0	1–0	1–2	—	0–0	1–0	0–1	3–0	1–2	1–0	2–5	1–1	0–2
Al Masry	1–0	1–1	1–2	2–2	0–1	1–1	1–0	4–1	0–1	—	3–2	0–2	1–3	0–0	2–2	0–0	0–0	0–0
Misr Lel Makkasa	0–1	0–0	0–0	0–2	0–3	0–1	2–0	2–2	0–0	0–2	—	0–3	1–2	0–0	0–2	0–0	0–0	0–1
Al Mokawloon Al Arab	0–0	0–1	1–0	2–2	0–1	1–0	0–0	1–1	1–1	2–1	1–1	—	1–1	2–0	0–2	0–0	1–1	1–2
National Bank of Egypt	0–0	0–0	2–1	1–1	1–4	2–1	1–1	1–0	1–1	2–2	1–0	2–1	—	0–1	0–1	1–2	3–0	1–2
Pharco	1–4	1–0	1–1	1–0	1–0	1–1	0–0	0–0	0–1	0–1	2–0	1–0	2–2	—	1–2	0–0	0–1	0–1
Pyramids	2–0	0–1	3–0	1–0	0–0	1–0	1–3	1–0	3–0	3–1	2–1	1–0	1–0	0–0	—	5–1	3–0	2–3
Smouha	3–2	1–1	3–0	1–1	1–1	2–0	2–2	2–1	4–4	2–1	1–0	1–1	0–1	0–0	0–2	—	1–0	2–0
Tala'ea El Gaish	1–0	1–0	1–1	1–1	1–0	0–0	0–1	1–0	2–1	1–0	0–0	1–0	1–1	1–0	2–2	3–3	—	0–2
Zamalek	3–5	3–2	1–2	0–2	3–2	4–0	2–1	2–1	1–1	2–1	5–0	1–0	1–1	0–0	3–0	2–0	0–1	—

Source: Flashscore
Legend: Blue = home team win; Yellow = draw; Red = away team win.
For upcoming matches, an "a" indicates there is an article about the rivalry between the two participants.

== Season statistics ==
=== Top goalscorers ===
As of 31 August 2022

Rank	Player	Club	Goals
1	(Egypt) Zizo	Zamalek	19
2	(Egypt) Marwan Hamdy	Smouha	15
3	(Nigeria) John Okoye Ebuka	ENPPI	13
3	(Angola) Mabululu	Al Ittihad	13
5	(Egypt) Mostafa Shalaby	ENPPI	11
6	(Egypt) Shady Hussein	Ceramica Cleopatra	10
6	(Egypt) Ahmed Refaat	Future	10
7	(Tunisia) Seifeddine Jaziri	Zamalek	9
7	(Egypt) Nasser Mansi	Pyramids National Bank of Egypt	9
7	(Egypt) Ahmet Atef	Future	9
7	(Egypt) Mohamed Helal	National Bank of Egypt	9

==== Top assists ====
no	Name	Club	Appearance	Assists
1	(Egypt) Mohamed Magdy	Ahly SC	5	4
1	(Egypt) Ahmed Madbouly	Ismaily SC	5	4
2	(Cameroon) Jonathan Ngwem	Future FC	5	3
2	(Egypt) Mohamed Hamdy	Pyramids FC	5	3
4	(Morocco) Abdelkabir El Ouadi	Smouha SC	1	2
5	(Egypt) Hussein Faisal	Smouha SC	4	2
6	(Egypt) Ahmed Sayed	Zamalek SC	5	2
6	(Tunisia) Ali Maaloul	Ahly SC	5	2
6	(Burkina Faso) Saïdou Simporé	Ittihad Alex	5	2
6	(Morocco) Walid El Karti	Pyramids FC	5	2

=== Clean sheets ===
no	Name	Club	Appearance	CL SH
1	(Egypt) Mohamed Majdi	Makassa FC	5	3
2	(Egypt) Ali Lotfi	Ahly SC	2	2
4	(Egypt) Mohamed Abou Gabal	Zamalek SC	3	2
	(Egypt) Amr Shaaban	Ghazl El Mahala FC	3	2
	(Egypt) Sherif Ekramy	Pyramids FC	3	2
5	(Egypt) El Hany Soliman	Smouha SC	4	2
5	(Egypt) Mahmoud El Zonfouly	NBE SC	5	2
7	(Egypt) Mohamed Sobhy	Pharco FC	5	2
7	(Egypt) Amer Mohamed	Cleopatra FC	5	2
7	(Egypt) Mohamed Abdel Monsef	Ittihad Alex	5	2
	(Egypt) Ahmed Masoud	Al Masry	5	2

== Number of teams by governorate ==
Number of teams	Governorate	Team(s)
7	Cairo	Al Ahly, ENPPI, Future, Al Mokawloon Al Arab, National Bank of Egypt, Pyramids and Tala'ea El Gaish
3	Alexandria	Al Ittihad, Pharco and Smouha
3	Giza	Ceramica Cleopatra, Eastern Company and Zamalek
1	Faiyum	Misr Lel Makkasa
1	El Gharbia	Ghazl El Mahalla
1	Ismailia	Ismaily
1	Port Said	Al Masry
1	Red Sea	El Gouna
