= Omar El Said =

Egyptian footballer (born 1990)

Personal information
- Date of birth: 23 June 1990 (age 36)
- Height: 1.90 m (6 ft 3 in)
- Position: Striker

Senior career*
Years	Team	Apps	(Gls)
2013–2015	El Gouna	42	(5)
2015–2016	Misr Lel-Makkasa	6	(0)
2016–2017	El-Entag El-Harby	39	(13)
2017–2018	Wadi Degla	12	(2)
2018–2022	Zamalek	62	(12)
2020–2021	→ El Gouna (loan)	20	(11)
2022–2024	Modern Sport	4	(1)

International career^{‡}
2019	Egypt	1	(0)
- * Club domestic league appearances and goals as of 1 December 2022 ‡ National team caps and goals as of 14 October 2019

Omar El Said (Arabic: عمر السعيد; born 23 June 1990) is an Egyptian professional footballer who plays as a striker who last played for Egyptian Premier League club Modern Sport. El Said scored 5 goals in the first 4 matches in 2017–18 Egyptian Premier League season, which made him on the top of scorers' list so far.

== International career ==
He made his debut for the Egypt national football team on 14 October 2019 in a friendly against Botswana.

== Honours ==
Zamalek

- Egyptian Premier League: 2020-21-2021-22
- Saudi-Egyptian Super Cup: 2018
- CAF Confederation Cup: 2018–19
- Egypt Cup: 2018–19, 2021
- Egyptian Super Cup: 2019–20
- CAF Super Cup: 2020
