= Ahmed Nabil =

Ahmed Nabil may refer to:

- Ahmed Nabil (fencer) (born 1986), Egyptian fencer
- Ahmed Nabil (footballer) (born 1991), Egyptian footballer
