= Mahmoud El Zanfaly =

Egyptian footballer (born 1992)

Personal information
- Full name: Mahmoud Ahmed Mohamed Ahmed El Zanfaly
- Date of birth: 28 April 1992 (age 34)
- Place of birth: Egypt
- Height: 1.90 m (6 ft 3 in)
- Position: Goalkeeper

Team information
- Current team: Al Ahly

Youth career
- Wadi Degla

Senior career*
Years	Team	Apps	(Gls)
2012–2013	Wadi Degla		
2013–2014	El Minya		
2014–2016	Tala'ea El Gaish	0	(0)
2016–2017	Aswan	0	(0)
2017–2018	El Raja	22	(0)
2018–2020	Al Ittihad	20	(0)
2020–2023	National Bank of Egypt SC	52	(0)
2023–	El Dakhleya SC	11	(0)
2024–2024	→ Al Ahly (loan)	0	(0)
- * Club domestic league appearances and goals

Mahmoud El Zanfaly (Arabic: محمود الزنفلي; born 28 April 1992), also transliterated El Zonfoly or El Zonfouly, is an Egyptian footballer who plays for Egyptian Premier League side Al Ahly as a goalkeeper.

== Career statistics ==
=== Club ===
As of match played 1 January 2024

Appearances and goals by club, season and competition
Club	Season	League			National cup (Note: Includes Egypt Cup, Egyptian League Cup)		Continental		Other		Total	
Club	Season	Division	Apps	Goals	Apps	Goals	Apps	Goals	Apps	Goals	Apps	Goals
Aswan SC	2016-17	Egyptian Premier League	0	0	1	0	—		—		1	0
El Raja SC	2017-18	Egyptian Premier League	22	0	—		—		—		22	0
Al Ittihad	2018-19	Egyptian Premier League	12	0	1	0	—		—		13	0
Al Ittihad	2019-20	Egyptian Premier League	7	0	2	0	—		—		9	0
Al Ittihad	Total		19	0	3	0	0	0	0	0	22	0
National Bank of Egypt SC	2020-21	Egyptian Premier League	23	0	1	0	—		—		24	0
National Bank of Egypt SC	2021-22	Egyptian Premier League	28	0	2	0	—		—		30	0
National Bank of Egypt SC	2022-23	Egyptian Premier League	1	0	—		—		—		1	0
National Bank of Egypt SC	Total		52	0	3	0	0	0	0	0	55	0
El Dakhleya SC	2023-24	Egyptian Premier League	11	0	—		—		—		11	0
Al Ahly	2023-24	Egyptian Premier League	0	0	—		—		—		0	0
Career Total			104	0	7	0	0	0	0	0	111	0

== Honours ==
Al Ahly

- CAF Champions League: 2023-24
