= Ahmed Dawouda =

Egyptian footballer (born 1989)

Personal information
- Full name: Ahmed Osama Fattouh El Essawy
- Date of birth: 25 June 1989 (age 37)
- Place of birth: Birket El Sab, El Monufia, Egypt
- Height: 1.79 m (5 ft 10 in)
- Position: Attacking midfielder

Team information
- Current team: Al Mokawloon Al Arab

Youth career
- 2002–2005: Gomhoriat Shebin

Senior career*
Years	Team	Apps	(Gls)
2005–2010	Gomhoriat Shebin		
2010	Skënderbeu Korçë	8	(2)
2010–2015	Al Masry	53	(1)
2012	→ Ismaily (loan)	0	(0)
2013	→ Wadi Degla (loan)	15	(0)
2015–2017	Misr Lel Makkasa	33	(1)
2017–2019	Zamalek	13	(0)
2018–2019	→ Al Ittihad (loan)	6	(0)
2019–2020	Tala'ea El-Gaish	14	(0)
2020–	Al Mokawloon Al Arab	0	(0)

International career^{‡}
2013	Egypt	1	(0)
- * Club domestic league appearances and goals as of 18:55, 8 November 2018 (UTC) ‡ National team caps and goals as of 19:27, 7 March 2013

Ahmed Dawouda (Arabic: أحمد داوودا; born 25 June 1989), also transliterated Daouda or Dawooda, is an Egyptian footballer who plays for Egyptian Premier League side Al Mokawloon Al Arab, as an attacking midfielder.

== Honours ==
=== Zamalek ===
- Egypt Cup (1): 2017–18
