= Mahmoud Shaaban =

Egyptian footballer (born 1995)

Personal information
- Date of birth: 7 March 1995 (age 31)
- Place of birth: Egypt
- Position: Defender

Senior career*
Years	Team	Apps	(Gls)
2015-2021	Al-Ittihad	74	(0)
2021-24	Future FC	46	(0)
2024-	Modern Sport FC	14	(0)
- * Club domestic league appearances and goals

Mahmoud Shaaban (Arabic: مَحْمُود شَعْبَان; born 7 March 1995) is an Egyptian footballer who plays for the Egyptian Premier League side Future FC as a defender.

== Biography ==
Mahmoud Shaaban was born on 7 March 1995 in Egypt. He started his football career Al-Ittihad in 2015. In 2019 he was transferred to FC Masr and in the same year, he was returned to Al Ittihad. In 2021 he was bought by Ghazl El Mahalla and he is currently in Future FC.
