= Ramzy Khaled =

Egyptian footballer (born 1992)

Personal information
- Full name: Ramzy Khaled Saad Abdel Hamid
- Date of birth: 2 June 1992 (age 34)
- Place of birth: Zagazig, El Sharkia, Egypt
- Height: 1.78 m (5 ft 10 in)
- Position: Right back

Team information
- Current team: Masri
- Number: 30

Youth career
- Petrojet

Senior career*
Years	Team	Apps	(Gls)
2011–2013	Petrojet		
2013–2014	El Sharkia		
2014–2016	Al Ittihad	36	(1)
2016–2018	Zamalek	5	(0)
2017	→ Al Mokawloon (loan)	5	(0)
2017–2018	→ Al Ittihad (loan)	19	(0)
2018–2019	Al Ittihad	6	(0)
2019	Wadi Degla	2	(0)
2019	Smouha	0	(0)
2019–	Masri	1	(0)
- * Club domestic league appearances and goals as of 23:24, 28 October 2019 (UTC)

Ramzy Khaled (Arabic: رمزي خالد; born 2 June 1992), is an Egyptian footballer who plays for Egyptian Premier League side Haras El Hodood SC as a defender.

== Honours ==
Zamalek

- Egypt Cup: 2015–16
