= Hossam Arafat (footballer) =

Egyptian footballer (born 1990)

Personal information
- Full name: Hossam Arafat Abdalla Hassan
- Date of birth: 18 January 1990 (age 36)
- Place of birth: Mansoura, Egypt
- Height: 1.81 m (5 ft 11 1/2 in)
- Position: Attacking midfielder

Team information
- Current team: Awsan
- Number: 7

Youth career
- 2007–2009: Mansoura

Senior career*
| Years | Team | Apps | (Gls) |
| 2009–2012 | Zamalek | 18 | (1) |
| 2013 | → Petrojet (loan) | | |
| 2013–2014 | Ghazl El-Mahalla | | |
| 2014–2021 | Wadi Degla | | |
| 2021– | ENPPI | | |

International career
| 2008–2009 | Egypt U20 | 7 | (2) |
| 2010 | Egypt U23 | 2 | (1) |
- * Club domestic league appearances and goals

Hossam Arafat Abdalla Hassan (Arabic: حسام عرفات عبدالله حسن) (born on 18 January 1990) is an Egyptian footballer. He currently plays for the Egyptian Premier League side ENPPI.

== Professional career ==
=== Early career ===
Arafat started his career at El Mansoura before moving to El Zamalek.

=== International career ===
Arafat currently plays for the Egyptian U-20 national youth team. He led the attacking midfield line in the 2009 FIFA U-20 World Cup that was hosted by Egypt from September 25 to October 16.
