= Mohamed Abdel Razek =

Egyptian footballer (born 1993)

Bazoka
Personal information
- Full name: Mohamed El Sayed Abdel Razek
- Date of birth: 1 September 1993 (age 33)
- Place of birth: Minya El Qamh, El Sharkia, Egypt
- Height: 1.80 m (5 ft 11 in)
- Position: Centre-back

Team information
- Current team: Tala'ea El Gaish
- Number: 4

Youth career
- El Sharkia

Senior career*
Years	Team	Apps	(Gls)
2010–2014	El Sharkia		
2014–2015	Zamalek	0	(0)
2014–2015	→ Al Ittihad (loan)	10	(2)
2015–2019	Al Ittihad	80	(6)
2019–	Tala'ea El Gaish	31	(3)
- * Club domestic league appearances and goals as of 29 October 2020

Mohamed Abdel Razek (Arabic: محمد عبد الرازق; born 1 September 1993), known by his nickname Bazoka (Arabic: بازوكا), is an Egyptian footballer who plays for Egyptian Premier League side Tala'ea El Gaish as a centre-back.
