= Wilson Akakpo =

Association football player

Personal information
- Full name: Wilson Akakpo
- Date of birth: 10 October 1992 (age 34)
- Place of birth: Ho, Ghana
- Height: 1.83 m (6 ft 0 in)
- Position: Defender

Team information
- Current team: Al-Karkh

Youth career
- Berekum Chelsea

Senior career*
Years	Team	Apps	(Gls)
2012–2014	Berekum Chelsea	8	(0)
2014–2018	Al Masry	79	(1)
2018–2019	Al Ittihad	27	(1)
2019–2020	→ Al-Shoulla (loan)	16	(0)
2020–2021	Najaf		
2021–2023	Al-Quwa Al-Jawiya		
2023–	Al-Karkh		

International career^{‡}
2018–	Togo	2	(0)
- * Club domestic league appearances and goals as of 9:40, 9 January 2019 (UTC) ‡ National team caps and goals as of 27 March 2019

Wilson Akakpo (born 10 October 1992) is a Ghanaian-born Togolese professional footballer who plays for Al-Karkh and the Togolese national team as a defender.

== International career ==
Born in Ghana and of Togolese descent, on 22 September 2017 Akakpo was called up to the Togo squad by coach Claude Le Roy for their friendly fixtures. He made his first appearance with Togo on 18 November 2018 against Algeria in a 2019 Africa Cup of Nations qualification match, coming in as an early substitute for the injured Sadat Ouro-Akoriko.

== Honours ==
Al-Quwa Al-Jawiya

- Iraq FA Cup: 2022–23
