= El Sayed Salem =

Egyptian footballer (born 1987)

Personal information
- Full name: El Sayed Salem Ali
- Date of birth: 10 July 1987 (age 39)
- Place of birth: El Sharkia, Egypt
- Height: 1.78 m (5 ft 10 in)
- Position: Left back

Team information
- Current team: Al Ittihad
- Number: 13

Senior career*
Years	Team	Apps	(Gls)
2009–2011	Ghazl El Mahalla	?	(?)
2011–2013	Ala'ab Damanhour	?	(?)
2013–2019	Wadi Degla	148	(7)
2019–	Al Ittihad	69	(2)
- * Club domestic league appearances and goals

El Sayed Salem Ali (Egyptian Arabic: السيد سالم; born 10 July 1987) is an Egyptian footballer who plays for Egyptian Premier League club Al Ittihad as a left back.
