= Ahmed Kabouria =

Egyptian association football player (born 1988)

Personal information
- Full name: Ahmed Mohamed Mohamed Mousa
- Date of birth: 17 January 1988 (age 38)
- Place of birth: Monufia Governorate, Egypt
- Position: Midfielder

Team information
- Current team: Ittihad Alexandria (on loan from Zamalek)
- Number: 26

Senior career*
Years	Team	Apps	(Gls)
2013–2014	Ghazl Shebin		
2014–2015	Misr		
2015–2017	Al-Masry		
2017–	Zamalek		
2018–	→ Ittihad Alexandria (on loan)		

International career
- Egypt
- * Club domestic league appearances and goals as of 14:11, 8 September 2017 (UTC)

Ahmed Mohamed Mohamed Mousa (Arabic: أَحْمَد مُحَمَّد مُحَمَّد مُوسَى; born 17 January 1988), better known as Ahmed Kabouria or Kaboria [2], is an Egyptian footballer who plays for Egyptian Premier League side Zamalek SC as a midfielder [3].

== Football career ==
=== Beginnings ===
His passion for playing football in the village began at the age of 13, after he spent his exams at the Railroad Club, but did not succeed, so he played 4 consecutive seasons with Ghazal Shebin.

=== Shebin ===
Throughout the four seasons he played with Ghazal Shebin, his talent emerged and became very sought after by the Arab Contractors, but the officials refused to leave the player and keep him away from the ball for a full year, having felt a great chance of being in the Premier League at a young age. When Al-Ahly took over the first team of Ghazal Shebin, he managed to convince the player to return to the club and participate with the first team in the third division games. The player has already contributed significantly after two seasons to qualify for the second division to play 4 seasons with Ghazal Shebin.Sami Sami played a prominent role in the presentation of Ahmed Moussa with the first team to spin Shibin during the period of his leadership in the roles of sections III and II, where he received many offers from clubs Arab Contractors and Club Victory (Egypt), Al-Nasr, Al-Mansoura, Al-Sharqiya Al-Sharqiyya, and was nominated for Hossam El-Badri during his training for the ENPI Club. However, [Sami's shirts] always advised him not to rush to choose the next step, despite the wonderful financial offers in the offers from those clubs, comparebyhat he was paid B from ,he spinning of Shebin; where he was getting monthly the amount of 900 pounds only.

=== Masr ===
He achieved his dream of moving to the Premier League through the Egypt Club for Clearing Gate when Tarek Yehia saw the coach at that time during one of Fayoumi's friendly matches with Ghazal Shebin, which is customary for Sami to wear for friendly matches. Is continuing with the Premier League teams, and the player officially joins the clearing season 2014–2015, but he did not participate with Ihab Galal in only 3 games.

=== Masry ===
In the last match of Egypt for the 2014–2015 season, he played for Al Ittihad of Alexandria, knowing that he had left the Fayoumi team officially because of the few matches he had participated in. After the meeting he received a tribute from Brigadier General Hossam Hassan who asked him not to sign Team; waiting to be with him in his next step. Al-Masri's club joined Al-Masri for two seasons after Hossam Hassan trained Al-Borseidi's team, and the message of the dean of the former world players in their first training in Port Said was that he would make him a great player in Egypt. And a goal-financier for his teammates, to make a contribution to the team's Egyptian Premier League 2015-16 ranking table and qualify for the Confederations Cup 2017.

=== The Egyptian league ===
He won the title of "Mr Assist" as the best goals maker in the 2015-2016 season with 13 goals in his appearance in the spotlight and fame, where his talent and skill helped him to draw the attention of observers and analysts of the Egyptian league. In this season he presented a season of the finest under the leadership of the twins Hossam Hassan and Ibrahim Hassan, with limited possibilities, and a group of players submerged. Hossam Hassan managed to reach them to fourth place And qualify for the Confederation of African Confederation Cup 2017.
