= Didier Koré =

Ivorian footballer

Personal information
- Full name: Didier Florent Guibihi Koré
- Date of birth: 27 April 1989 (age 37)
- Place of birth: Abidjan, Ivory Coast
- Height: 1.80 m (5 ft 11 in)
- Position: Midfielder

Youth career
- 2007–2009: Stade d'Abidjan
- 2009–2010: USC Bassam

Senior career*
Years	Team	Apps	(Gls)
2010–2011	EFO		
2011–2015	Ashanti Gold		
2015	CS Sfaxien		
2016–2018	Al Mokawloon Al Arab		
2018–2019	Al Ittihad	9	(1)
2019	→ Nogoom (loan)	9	(0)
2019–2023	Naft Al-Wasat		(8)
2023–2024	Al-Minaa		
- * Club domestic league appearances and goals as of 23:14, 27 September 2024

Didier Koré (born 27 April 1989) is an Ivorian professional footballer who plays as a midfielder.

== Honours ==
Ashanti Gold

- Ghana Premier League: 2015
