= Mohamed Helal =

Egyptian footballer (born 1995)

Personal information
- Full name: Mohamed Helal
- Date of birth: 8 October 1995 (age 31)
- Place of birth: Egypt
- Position: Midfielder

Team information
- Current team: National Bank of Egypt
- Number: 10

Youth career
- –2014: Lierse S.K.
- 2014: Wadi Degla

Senior career*
Years	Team	Apps	(Gls)
2014–2015	Lierse	4	(0)
2015–21	Wadi Degla	51	(9)
2021-24	Bank El Ahly	88	(23)
2024-	Modern Sport FC	17	(5)
- * Club domestic league appearances and goals as of 21 October 2016

Mohamed Helal (8 October 1995) is an Egyptian professional football player who currently plays for Egyptian Premier League club National Bank of Egypt as a midfielder.

== Club career ==
Helal made his professional debut at 3 December 2014 against SV Zulte Waregem in a 2–1 away defeat in the Belgian Cup. He played the full game.
