= Razack Cissé =

Ivorian footballer (born 1998)

Personal information
- Full name: Abdul Razack Cissé
- Date of birth: 30 December 1998 (age 27)
- Place of birth: Ivory Coast
- Position: Winger

Team information
- Current team: ASEC Mimosas

Youth career
- FC Mouna d'Akoupé

Senior career*
Years	Team	Apps	(Gls)
2015–2017	FC Mouna d'Akoupé		
2017	Aswan	17	(1)
2017–2022	Zamalek	6	(0)
2018–2021	→ Al Ittihad (loan)	66	(15)
2022–2023	National Bank	0	(0)
2024–	ASEC Mimosas	0	(0)
- * Club domestic league appearances and goals as of 18:55, 8 November 2018 (UTC)

Abdul Razack Cissé (born 30 December 1998) is an Ivorian footballer who plays for Ligue 1 side ASEC Mimosas, as a winger. He was a member of the Ivory Coast national under-20 football team at the 2017 Jeux de la Francophonie.
