= Karim El Deeb =

Egyptian footballer (born 1995)

Personal information
- Full name: Karim El Deeb
- Date of birth: 10 June 1995 (age 31)
- Place of birth: El Monufia, Egypt
- Position: Left-back

Team information
- Current team: Al Ittihad
- Number: 17

Youth career
- Tanta

Senior career*
Years	Team	Apps	(Gls)
2012–2013	Tanta		
2013–2019	Al Mokawloon Al Arab	29	(0)
2015	→ El Raja (loan)	4	(0)
2018–2019	→ Al Ittihad (loan)	19	(2)
2019–	Al Ittihad	2	(0)
- * Club domestic league appearances and goals as of 18:55, 8 November 2018 (UTC)

Karim El Deeb (Arabic: كريم الديب; born 10 June 1995), is an Egyptian footballer who plays for Egyptian Premier League side Al Ittihad as a left-back.
