= El Hany Soliman =

Egyptian footballer (born 1984)

Personal information
- Full name: El Hany Soliman Moussa Soliman
- Date of birth: 7 August 1984 (age 42)
- Place of birth: Alexandria, Egypt
- Height: 1.87 m (6 ft 2 in)
- Position: Goalkeeper

Youth career
- Al Ittihad

Senior career*
Years	Team	Apps	(Gls)
2004–2013	Al Ittihad	119	(0)
2013–2015	El Gouna	10	(0)
2015–2019	Al Ittihad	75	(0)
2019–2026	Smouha	174	(0)

International career^{‡}
- Egypt U-17
- Egypt U-20
2006–2008	Egypt U-23	9	(0)
2008–2013	Egypt	24	(0)
- * Club domestic league appearances and goals as of 20:23, 1st December 2026 (UTC) ‡ National team caps and goals as of 20:01, 7 March 2013 (UTC)

El Hany Soliman Moussa Soliman (Arabic: الهاني سليمان; born 7 August 1984), is an Egyptian footballer who plays as a goalkeeper.

El Hany has had numerous call-ups for Egypt's full national team, as substitute goalkeeper, including the qualifiers. In addition, he represented Egypt at all youth levels, he played with the U-17, U-20 and the U-23 teams.
