= Khaled El Ghandour (footballer, born 1991) =

Egyptian association football player

Personal information
- Full name: Khaled Metwalli Abdel Hamid El Ghandour
- Date of birth: 15 May 1991 (age 35)
- Place of birth: Egypt
- Position: Midfielder

Team information
- Current team: Al Ittihad
- Number: 10

Senior career*
Years	Team	Apps	(Gls)
- Beni Ebeid
2014–2017	Ittihad El Shorta	69	(0)
2016–2017	→ Al Ittihad (loan)	20	(1)
2017–	Al Ittihad	94	(5)
- * Club domestic league appearances and goals as of 5 April 2021

Khaled Metwalli Abdel Hamid El Ghandour (Arabic: خالد الغندور; born 15 May 1991) is an Egyptian professional footballer who plays as a midfielder for Egyptian Premier League club Al Ittihad.
