= Karim Mamdouh =

Egyptian footballer (born 1993)

Personal information
- Full name: Karim Mamdouh Khaled
- Date of birth: 11 March 1993 (age 33)
- Place of birth: Egypt
- Positions: Right winger; forward; midfielder

Team information
- Current team: El Gaish (on loan from Al Ittihad)
- Number: 12

Senior career*
Years	Team	Apps	(Gls)
2013–2019	Wadi Degla		
2017–2018	→ El Makkasa (loan)	7	(0)
2019–	Al Ittihad	10	(0)
2019–	→ El Gaish (loan)	3	(0)

International career^{‡}
2015	Egypt U23	3	(0)
2016–	Egypt	1	(0)
- * Club domestic league appearances and goals as of 23:08, 4 February 2020 (UTC) ‡ National team caps and goals as of 12:23, 7 January 2017 (UTC)

Karim Mamdouh Khaled (born 3 March 1993) is an Egyptian footballer who plays in the Egyptian Premier League club Tala'ea El Gaish SC on loan from Al Ittihad as a defender or midfielder.

== International career ==
Mamdouh made his first international appearance with the senior national team on 29 January 2016, in a home game against Libya (2–0), after he came on as a substitute for Mahmoud Kahraba in the 68th minute of that game.
