= Emmanuel Banahene =

Ghanaian footballer

Personal information
- Full name: Emmanuel Osei Banahene
- Date of birth: 16 August 1988 (age 38)
- Place of birth: Ghana
- Height: 1.80 m (5 ft 11 in)
- Position: Striker

Youth career
- Dyword F.C.
- Cedars F.C.

Senior career*
Years	Team	Apps	(Gls)
2004–2005	Stay Cool F.C.	?	(?)
2005–2006	Inter Allies FC	?	(?)
2006–2008	Heart of Lions	?	(?)
2008–2009	Hapoel Petah Tikva	16	(1)
2009	→ Ramata HaSharon	14	(9)
2009–2010	Heart of Lions	?	(?)
2010–2011	Bechem Chelsea	?	(?)
2011–2013	Orduspor	2	(0)
2012	→ Giresunspor	15	(4)
2012–2013	→ Karşıyaka	31	(14)
2013–2014	Şanlıurfaspor	10	(6)
2015	Al-Orobah	13	(3)
2015–2017	Ismaily SC	48	(21)
2017	Şanlıurfaspor	9	(3)
2017	Al-Mina'a	0	(0)
2018–2020	Al-Ittihad Alexandria	31	(4)
2019	→ Al-Shoulla (loan)	18	(13)
2020	→ Al-Kawkab (loan)	14	(1)
2021	Saham	?	(?)
2021–2022	Al-Ansar		
2022–2023	Al-Zulfi		
- * Club domestic league appearances and goals as of 20 September 2020

Emmanuel Banahene Osei (born August 16, 1988) is a Ghanaian footballer. Banahene is most comfortable in attacking roles, mainly striker, winger or offensive midfielder.

== Career ==
Banahene started his career at Ghanaian side Stay Cool F.C. He then moved to International Allies, where he was part of the team which won the 3rd edition of the Mylik Classic U-19 Tournament, played between 27 and 29 November 2005 at Dansoman Park, Accra, Ghana. On June 3, 2006, Heart of Lions F.C. signed him to a 3-year contract. He was then bought by Israeli side Hapoel Petach Tikva in the summer of 2008. However, he received limited playing opportunities in first half of the 2008/2009 season and was subsequently loaned to lower-division side Ramata Shalon. At the end of his loan, in October 2009, he returned to Ghana to sign a new one-year contract with Heart of Lions F.C., starting a second stint at the club. In 2010, Banahene was sold again, this time to Berekum Chelsea, and then again the following year, to Turkish club Orduspor. In 2012, he was loaned to TFF First League team Giresunspor. In summer of 2012, he signed a one-year loan deal with Karşıyaka.On December 24, 2012, he terminated his agreement with Orduspor. In January 2015 he signed for Ismaily SC in a 2 1/2-year deal.

On 26 June 2022, Banahene joined Saudi Arabian club Al-Zulfi. On 5 January 2023, Banahene was released.
