= Mohamed Nagy (footballer, born 1996) =

Egyptian footballer (born 1996)

Gedo
Personal information
- Full name: Mohamed Nagy Kendil
- Date of birth: 20 December 1996 (age 29)
- Place of birth: El Monufia, Egypt
- Position: Forward

Youth career
- Petrojet
- Baladeyet El Mahalla

Senior career*
Years	Team	Apps	(Gls)
2012–2013	Baladeyet El Mahalla		
2013–2014	Sers El Layan		
2014	El Qanah		
2014–2015	Tersana		
2015–2016	Baladeyet El Mahalla		
2016–2017	Al Merreikh		
2017–2020	Al Ittihad	65	(13)
2020	→ Tanta (loan)	14	(2)
- * Club domestic league appearances and goals as of 23:20, 1 January 2021 (UTC)

Mohamed Nagy (Arabic: محمد ناجي; born 20 December 1996), known by his nickname Gedo (Arabic: جدو), is an Egyptian footballer who plays as a forward.
