= Khaled Kamar =

Egyptian footballer (born 1988)

Personal information
- Full name: Khaled Farag Mohamed Kamar
- Date of birth: 2 February 1988 (age 38)
- Place of birth: El Gharbia, Egypt
- Height: 1.75 m (5 ft 9 in)
- Position: Forward

Youth career
- Tanta

Senior career*
Years	Team	Apps	(Gls)
2006–2009	Tanta		
2009–2014	Ittihad El Shorta	67	(19)
2014–2018	Zamalek	32	(6)
2015–2016	→ Smouha (loan)	11	(3)
2016–2017	→ Al Ittihad (loan)	28	(3)
2018	→ El Entag El Harby (loan)	13	(9)
2018–2021	Al Ittihad	83	(22)
2021–2022	El Gouna	31	(8)
2022–2023	Tala'ea El Gaish	19	(3)
2023–2024	Raya Ghazl Kafr El Dawar		

International career^{‡}
2014–2015	Egypt	10	(1)
- * Club domestic league appearances and goals as of 25 October 2022 ‡ National team caps and goals as of 26 March 2016 (UTC)

Khaled Kamar (Arabic: خالد قمر; born 2 February 1988), is an Egyptian former footballer who played as a forward.

== Club career ==
Kamar started his career at Tanta, before joining Ittihad El Shorta in 2009. On 15 June 2014, Kamar signed a three years contract with Zamalek. He was later loaned out to Smouha, Al Ittihad and El Entag El Harby. In 2018, he rejoined Al Ittihad on a permanent deal, before joining El Gouna in 2021, followed by Tala'ea El Gaish in 2022. A year later, he moved to second division club Raya Ghazl Kafr El Dawar where he played until January 2024. He eventually concluded his career in July 2024.

== International career ==
Kamar made his debut with the coach Shawky Ghareeb against Bosnia and Herzegovina on 5 March 2014.

=== International goals ===
Scores and results list Egypt's goal tally first.

#	Date	Venue	Opponent	Score	Result	Competition
1.	30 May 2014	Julio Martínez Prádanos, Chile	Chile	2–0	2–3	Friendly

== Honours ==
=== Club ===
Zamalek SC

- Egyptian Premier League: 2014–15
