= Ahmed Nabil (footballer) =

Egyptian footballer (born 1991)

Personal information
- Full name: Ahmed Nabil Aly Daoud Marzouk
- Date of birth: December 24, 1991 (age 34)
- Place of birth: Egypt
- Height: 1.70 m (5 ft 7 in)
- Positions: Midfielder; right back

Team information
- Current team: Smouha

Youth career
- 2005–2010: Al-Ahly

Senior career*
Years	Team	Apps	(Gls)
2010–2014	Al-Ahly	38	(2)
2014	Smouha		

International career
2009–	Egypt U-20	11	(4)
- * Club domestic league appearances and goals

Ahmed Nabil Aly Daoud Marzouk (Arabic: أحمد نبيل علي داوود مرزوق), more commonly known as Manga (born October 3, 1991) is an Egyptian footballer who plays as a right back for Smouha.

In January 2016 he named his newborn son after Mesut Özil.
