= Wadi Degla SC =

Association football club in Cairo, Egypt

Wadi Degla
- Full name: Wadi Degla Sporting Club
- Nicknames: مجتمع الأبطال (Community of Champions) الغزلان (Deer)
- Short name: WDG
- Founded: 2002; 24 years ago
- Ground: Petro Sport Stadium
- Capacity: 16,000
- Coordinates: 29°57′26″N 31°18′49″E
- Chairman: Tarek Rashed
- League: Egyptian Premier League
- 2024–25: Egyptian Second Division A, 2nd of 20 (Promoted)
Home colours	Away colours

Wadi Degla Sporting Club (Arabic: نادي وادي دجلة الرياضي) is a professional sports club based in Cairo, Egypt. The club was founded in 2002. It is related to Wadi Degla Holding, a construction company established in 1994.

The club is primarily known for its football team, that play in the Egyptian Premier League. In 2009–10, the club was promoted to the Egyptian Premier League for the first time in its history.

== History ==
In 2009–10 Egyptian Second Division, Wadi Degla made history. The team defeated El-Sekka El-Hadid 3–1 in the last week of the competition to seal promotion to the highest level of football in Egypt, Egyptian Premier League, for the first time in its history. It took Wadi Degla only one season to gain promotion from the second division to the Premier League. This is a historical achievement that was only reached once before by Al-Mokawloon Al-Arab (a.k.a. Arab Contractors) in 1981.

Omar Marmoush used to play for Wadi Degla.

Wadi Degla was promoted to the Egyptian Premier League for the 2025-26 season, securing a place in the top division after finishing second in the 2024–25 Egyptian Second Division A. They joined Al Mokawloon Al Arab and Kahraba Ismailia as the three promoted teams, with the league expanding to 21 teams

== Associated clubs ==
In 2003, English club Arsenal ran an academy training program with the club's youth system, the programme is no longer operational.

- (Belgium) Lierse
- (England) Arsenal

== Honours ==
=== League ===
- Egyptian Second Division
  - Winners (1): 2009–10

=== Cup ===
- Egypt Cup
  - Runners-up (1): 2012–13

== Performance in CAF competitions ==
- FR = First round
- SR = Second round

Season	Competition	Round	Country	Club	Home	Away	Aggregate
2014	CAF Confederation Cup	FR	Togo	AS Douanes Lomé	2–0	1–1	3–1
2014	CAF Confederation Cup	SR	Mali	Djoliba	2–0	0–2	2–2 (2–3 p)

== Performance in domestic competitions ==
Egyptian Clubs Competitions
Year	League	Position	Egypt Cup	Super Cup
2009–10	Egyptian Second Division	1 (Group B)	Third round	
2010–11	Egyptian Premier League	12	Round of 16	
2011–12	Egyptian Premier League	not finished	not held	
2012–13	Egyptian Premier League	not finished	Runners-up	
2013–14	Egyptian Premier League	6 (Group 2)	Semi-final	
2014–15	Egyptian Premier League	5	Round of 16	
2015–16	Egyptian Premier League	5	Round of 16	
2016–17	Egyptian Premier League	12	Quarter-final	
2017–18	Egyptian Premier League	15	Quarter-final	
2018–19	Egyptian Premier League	10	Round of 16	
2019–20	Egyptian Premier League	15	Round of 16	
2020–21	Egyptian Premier League	16	Quarter-finals	

== Current squad ==
As of 8 September 2026

Note: Flags indicate national team as defined under FIFA eligibility rules; some limited exceptions apply. Players may hold more than one non-FIFA nationality.

No.	Pos.	Nation	Player
1	GK	EGY	Amr Hossam
2	DF	EGY	Shady Maher
3	DF	EGY	Omar Adly
4	MF	EGY	Islam Adel
5	DF	EGY	Ahmed Dahroug
6	DF	EGY	Kamal Aboul-Fetouh
7	FW	EGY	Ali Hussein (captain)
8	MF	EGY	Ahmed Scholes
9	FW	CIV	Franck Boli
10	FW	EGY	Mahmoud Diasty
11	FW	EGY	Mohamed Abdelrahim
12	DF	EGY	Ahmed Dahesh
14	MF	EGY	Mohamed Abdelaati
17	MF	EGY	Mahmoud Talaat
18	GK	EGY	Greisha
19	DF	EGY	Mahmoud Adel

No.	Pos.	Nation	Player
20	MF	EGY	Juhayna
21	DF	EGY	Ahmed Reda
22	MF	EGY	Ziad Anwar
23	DF	EGY	Ahmed Ayman
24	DF	EGY	Mohamed Ragab
25	MF	EGY	Ibrahim El Bahnasi
27	FW	EGY	Ahmed Refaat
28	DF	TUN	Seif Teka
30	MF	EGY	Mohamed Fathy
31	MF	EGY	Mahmoud Adel
32	FW	EGY	Ahmed Farouk
33	MF	EGY	Halimo
34	MF	NED	Mees Kaandorp
40	DF	EGY	Ahmed Abdin
44	MF	EGY	Ahmed El Shimi
99	GK	EGY	Abdelrahman Qattawy

=== Out on loan ===
Note: Flags indicate national team as defined under FIFA eligibility rules; some limited exceptions apply. Players may hold more than one non-FIFA nationality.

No.	Pos.	Nation	Player

== Managers ==
- (Egypt) Hesham Zakaria (1 July 2007 – 23 May 2010)
- (Belgium) Walter Meeuws (24 May 2010 – 30 June 2012)
- (Egypt) Hesham Zakaria (1 July 2012 – 31 December 2012)
- (Egypt) Mohamed Gamal (1 January 2013 – 5 April 2013)
- (Egypt) Hany Ramzy (6 April 2013 – 12 January 2014)
- (Egypt) Hesham Zakaria (13 January 2014 – 1 October 2014)
- (Egypt) Hamada Sedki (1 October 2014 – 14 January 2016)
- (France) Patrice Carteron (15 January 2016 – 15 November 2016)
- (Egypt) Mido (15 November 2016 – December 2017)
- (Egypt) Tarek El Ashry (17 January 2018 – May 2018)
- (Greece) Takis Gonias (12 June 2018 – 10 February 2020)
- (Algeria) Mustafa Al-Kharoubi (Caretaker) (10 February 2020 – 20 February 2020)
- (Cyprus) Nikodimos Papavasiliou (20 February 2020 – 21 January 2021)
- (Chile) Mario Salas (1 February 2021 – 27 May 2021)
- (Egypt) Abdul Baki Jamal (27 May 2021 – present)

== Women ==
Wadi Degla women SC, the women's team won the 2020 Egyptian Women's Premier League for the 11th time and will feature in the inaugural CAF Women's Champions League.
