= 2018–19 ENPPI SC season =

ENPPI
2018–19 season
- President: Alaa Khashab
- Manager: Khaled Metwalli (until 29 November); Ali Maher (from 1 December)
- Stadium: Petro Sport Stadium
- Egyptian Premier League: 9th
- Egypt Cup: Quarter-finals
- Top goalscorer: League: Odah Marshall (6 goals); All: Mahmoud Kaoud (8 goals)
| Home colours | Away colours |

The 2018–19 ENPPI season was the 34th edition in the football club's history and 15th consecutive and overall season in the topflight of Egyptian football, the Egyptian Premier League, having been promoted from the Egyptian Second Division in 2002. In addition to the domestic league, ENPPI also competed in this season's editions of the domestic cup, the Egypt Cup. The season covered a period from 1 July 2018 to 30 June 2019.

== Kit information ==
Supplier: Nike

| Home | Away | Goalkeeper 1 | Goalkeeper 2 | Goalkeeper 3 |

== Players ==
=== Current squad ===
As of 1 February 2019

Note: Flags indicate national team as defined under FIFA eligibility rules; some limited exceptions apply. Players may hold more than one non-FIFA nationality.

| No. | Pos. | Nation | Player |
|---|---|---|---|
| 1 | GK | EGY | Abdel Aziz El Baalouti |
| 2 | DF | EGY | Ali Fawzy |
| 3 | MF | MLI | Aboubacar Diarra |
| 4 | DF | EGY | Ibrahim Yehia |
| 5 | DF | EGY | Mahmoud Shabana |
| 6 | MF | EGY | Salah Soliman (3rd captain) |
| 7 | FW | EGY | Ahmed Refaat (on loan from Zamalek) |
| 8 | DF | EGY | Ramy Sabry (Captain) |
| 9 | FW | EGY | Arafa El Sayed |
| 10 | FW | COD | Chadrack Lukombe |
| 11 | FW | EGY | Mohamed Bassiouny |
| 12 | MF | EGY | Mahmoud Tobah |
| 13 | FW | TAN | Shiza Kichuya (on loan from Pharco) |
| 14 | MF | EGY | Mohamed Ashraf Roaa (on loan from Zamalek) |
| 15 | DF | EGY | Abdel Rahman Amer |
| 16 | GK | EGY | Amr Hossam |
| 17 | FW | CIV | Wilfried Yessoh |
| 18 | FW | EGY | Mohamed Shika |
| 19 | DF | EGY | Ahmed Abdel Aziz |
| 20 | FW | EGY | Mahmoud Kaoud |

| No. | Pos. | Nation | Player |
|---|---|---|---|
| 21 | FW | EGY | Ahmed Abdel Fattah |
| 22 | DF | EGY | Amr El Halwani (Vice-captain) |
| 23 | MF | EGY | Emad Fathy (on loan from Zamalek) |
| 24 | MF | EGY | Mahmoud Ghaly |
| 26 | DF | EGY | Ahmed Saber |
| 27 | MF | EGY | Mohamed Morsy |
| 28 | FW | EGY | Ahmed Shoukry |
| 29 | MF | EGY | Omar Fathy |
| 30 | FW | EGY | Omar Bassam |
| 31 | DF | EGY | Mostafa Adel |
| 32 | MF | EGY | Khaled Bassiouny |
| 33 | GK | EGY | Mahmoud Gad |
| 34 | MF | EGY | Hesham Adel |
| 35 | MF | EGY | Ahmed Hussein |
| 36 | DF | EGY | Mohamed Ragab |
| 37 | MF | EGY | Mohamed Ashraf |
| 38 | MF | EGY | Ahmed Youssef |
| 42 | MF | EGY | Ahmed Kasim |
| - | DF | EGY | Mohamed Shawky Gharieb |

=== Out on loan ===
Note: Flags indicate national team as defined under FIFA eligibility rules; some limited exceptions apply. Players may hold more than one non-FIFA nationality.

| No. | Pos. | Nation | Player |
|---|---|---|---|
| — | FW | EGY | Ahmed Ashraf (at FC Masr until 30 June 2019) |
| — | FW | EGY | Abdel Rahman Bogi (at US Monastir until 30 June 2019) |

| No. | Pos. | Nation | Player |
|---|---|---|---|
| — | FW | EGY | Mostafa Saad (at FC Masr until 30 June 2019) |

== Transfers ==
=== Transfers in ===
| # | Position | Player | Transferred from | Fee | Date | Source |
|---|---|---|---|---|---|---|
| 28 | DF | (Egypt) Mahmoud Shabana | (Egypt) FC Masr | Undisclosed | 23 May 2018 | |
| 25 | DF | (Egypt) Fady Nagah | (Austria) Mauerwerk SA | Undisclosed | 5 June 2018 | |
| 7 | FW | (United States) Noah Sadaoui | (Oman) Mirbat | Undisclosed | 7 June 2018 | |
| 16 | GK | (Egypt) Amr Hossam | (Egypt) Petrojet | Undisclosed | 16 June 2018 | |
| 18 | FW | (Egypt) Mohamed Shika | (Egypt) Pharco | E£3m (Note: Mohamed Shika originally joined ENPPI on loan until the end of the season, with the club having an option to buy the player permanently. On 5 September 2018, ENPPI announced that they activated their option to buy the player permanently.) | 20 June 2018 | |
| 24 | MF | (Egypt) Mahmoud Ghaly | (Egypt) Tanta | E£3.5m | 20 June 2018 | |
| 27 | MF | (Egypt) Mohamed Morsy | (Egypt) Tanta | E£3.5m | 20 June 2018 | |
| 13 | DF | (Burkina Faso) Yaya Sanou | (Burkina Faso) ASF Bobo Dioulasso | Undisclosed | 24 July 2018 | |
| 10 | FW | (Nigeria) Odah Marshall | (Nigeria) Rivers United | Undisclosed | 29 July 2018 | |
| 10 | FW | (Egypt) Omar Bassam | (Egypt) Misr Lel Makkasa | E£3m | 24 December 2018 | |
| 26 | DF | (Egypt) Ahmed Saber | (Egypt) El Dakhleya | Undisclosed | 24 December 2018 | |
| 29 | MF | (Egypt) Omar Fathy | (Egypt) Ismaily | Free transfer | 6 January 2019 | |
| 10 | FW | (Democratic Republic of the Congo) Chadrack Lukombe | (Democratic Republic of the Congo) AS Vita Club | E£900k | 8 January 2019 | |
| | FW | (Argentina) Brian Ferreira | (Chile) Coquimbo Unido | Free transfer | 12 January 2019 | |
| | DF | (Egypt) Mohamed Shawky Gharieb | (Egypt) Al Mokawloon Al Arab | Swap deal | 13 January 2019 | |
| 17 | FW | (Ivory Coast) Wilfried Yessoh | (Indonesia) PSMS Medan | Free transfer | 13 January 2019 | |
| 28 | FW | (Egypt) Ahmed Shoukry | (Egypt) Al Masry | Undisclosed | 29 January 2019 | |

==== Loans in ====
| # | Position | Player | Loaned from | Date | Loan expires | Source |
|---|---|---|---|---|---|---|
| 14 | MF | (Egypt) Mohamed Ashraf Roaa | (Egypt) Zamalek | 24 July 2018 | 30 June 2019 | |
| 23 | MF | (Egypt) Emad Fathy | (Egypt) Zamalek | 30 July 2018 | 30 June 2019 | |
| 7 | FW | (Egypt) Ahmed Refaat | (Egypt) Zamalek | 29 January 2019 | 30 June 2019 | |
| 13 | FW | (Tanzania) Shiza Kichuya | (Egypt) Pharco | 31 January 2019 | 30 June 2019 | |

=== Transfers out ===
| Position | Player | Transferred to | Fee | Date | Source |
|---|---|---|---|---|---|
| FW | (Egypt) Fathy Osman | (Egypt) Tala'ea El Gaish | Free transfer | 20 May 2018 | |
| FW | (Egypt) Mohamed Magdy | (Egypt) Pyramids | E£30m | 21 June 2018 | |
| GK | (Egypt) Emad El Sayed | (Egypt) Zamalek | E£3m | 21 June 2018 | |
| MF | (Egypt) Bassam Maher | (Egypt) El Dakhleya | Free transfer | 30 June 2018 | |
| FW | (Egypt) Abdallah Gomaa Awad | (Egypt) Haras El Hodoud | Free transfer | 30 June 2018 | |
| FW | (Honduras) Marlon Ramírez | (Honduras) CD Marathón | Free transfer | 30 June 2018 | |
| DF | (Egypt) Ahmed Younis | Released | | 30 June 2018 | |
| FW | (Egypt) Ahmed Kamal | Released | | 30 June 2018 | |
| FW | (Egypt) Hussein Ragab | (Egypt) Misr Lel Makkasa | End of loan | 30 June 2018 | |
| DF | (Egypt) Samir Fekri | (Egypt) El Dakhleya | Undisclosed | 19 December 2018 | |
| FW | (Nigeria) Odah Marshall | (Egypt) Ismaily | Free transfer | 7 January 2019 | |
| FW | (United States) Noah Sadaoui | (Morocco) Mouloudia Oujda | Free transfer | 9 January 2019 | |
| MF | (Egypt) Hamdy Fathy | (Egypt) Al Ahly | E£25m | 13 January 2019 | |
| DF | (Egypt) Fady Nagah | (Egypt) Al Mokawloon Al Arab | Swap deal | 13 January 2019 | |
| DF | (Burkina Faso) Yaya Sanou | (Egypt) Beni Suef | Undisclosed | 23 January 2019 | |
| FW | (Argentina) Brian Ferreira | Released | | 30 January 2019 | |

==== Loans out ====
| Position | Player | Loaned to | Date | Loan expires | Source |
|---|---|---|---|---|---|
| FW | (Egypt) Ahmed Ashraf | (Egypt) FC Masr | 25 July 2018 | 30 June 2019 | |
| FW | (Egypt) Mostafa Saad | (Egypt) FC Masr | 25 July 2018 | 30 June 2019 | |
| FW | (Egypt) Abdel Rahman Bogi | (Tunisia) US Monastir | 15 January 2019 | 30 June 2020 | |

== Friendly matches ==
Win Draw Loss

| 11 July 2018 | ENPPI (Egypt) | 1–1 | (Egypt) Al Nasr | Cairo, Egypt |
| 16:00 CAT (UTC+2) | El Halwani (??) | Report | Dakhir (??) | Stadium: Petro Sport Stadium |

| 23 July 2018 | Al Ittihad (Egypt) | 2–0 | (Egypt) ENPPI | Alexandria, Egypt |
| 16:00 CAT (UTC+2) | Bazoka (??); Kamar (??) | Report | | Stadium: Alexandria Stadium; Attendance: 5,000 |

| 13 October 2019 | ENPPI (Egypt) | 0–1 | (Egypt) Al Mokawloon Al Arab | Cairo, Egypt |
| 17:00 CAT (UTC+2) | | Report | ?? (??) | Stadium: Petro Sport Stadium |

| 10 January 2019 | ENPPI (Egypt) | 2–0 | (Egypt) Ala'ab Damanhour | Cairo, Egypt |
| 15:00 CAT (UTC+2) | Lukombe (??); Shabana (??) | Report | | Stadium: Petro Sport Stadium |

| 17 January 2019 | ENPPI (Egypt) | 3–0 | (Egypt) East Insurance | Cairo, Egypt |
| 15:00 CAT (UTC+2) | E. Fathy (??); El Halwani (??); Lukombe (??) | Report | | Stadium: Petro Sport Stadium |

== Competitions ==
=== Overview ===
| Competition | First match | Last match | Starting round | Final position | Record | | | | | | | |
| Competition | First match | Last match | Starting round | Final position | Pld | W | D | L | GF | GA | GD | Win % |
|---|---|---|---|---|---|---|---|---|---|---|---|---|
| Egyptian Premier League | 3 August 2018 | 27 May 2019 | Matchday 1 | 9th | 34 | 9 | 13 | 12 | 39 | 42 | −3 | 26.47 |
| Egypt Cup | 9 October 2018 | 3 January 2019 | Round of 32 | Quarter-finals | 3 | 2 | 0 | 1 | 8 | 4 | +4 | 66.67 |
| Total | | | | | 37 | 11 | 13 | 13 | 47 | 46 | +1 | 29.73 |

Source: Competitions

=== Egyptian Premier League ===
==== League table ====
| Pos | Team | Pld | W | D | L | GF | GA | GD | Pts |
|---|---|---|---|---|---|---|---|---|---|
| 7 | Ismaily | 34 | 10 | 13 | 11 | 30 | 36 | −6 | 43 |
| 8 | Tala'ea El Gaish | 34 | 10 | 11 | 13 | 41 | 39 | +2 | 41 |
| 9 | ENPPI | 34 | 9 | 13 | 12 | 39 | 42 | −3 | 40 (Note: Tied on head-to-head points (3), on head-to-head goal difference (0), on head-to-head goals scored (3) and on head-to-head away goals scored (2). Overall goal difference: ENPPI –3, Wadi Degla –6.) |
| 10 | Wadi Degla | 34 | 10 | 10 | 14 | 41 | 47 | −6 | 40 |
| 11 | Al Ittihad | 34 | 9 | 12 | 13 | 41 | 56 | −15 | 39 |

Source: Soccerway
Rules for classification: 1) Points; 2) Head-to-Head points; 3) Head-to-Head goal difference; 4) Head-to-Head goals scored; 5) Head-to-Head away goals scored; 6) Goal difference; 7) Goals scored (Note: Head-to-head record is used only after all the matches between the teams in question have been played).

==== Results summary ====
| Overall | | | | | | | | Home | | | | | | Away | | | | | |
| Pld | W | D | L | GF | GA | GD | Pts | W | D | L | GF | GA | GD | W | D | L | GF | GA | GD |
|---|---|---|---|---|---|---|---|---|---|---|---|---|---|---|---|---|---|---|---|
| 34 | 9 | 13 | 12 | 39 | 42 | −3 | 40 | 5 | 5 | 7 | 18 | 20 | −2 | 4 | 8 | 5 | 21 | 22 | −1 |

Source: Soccerway

==== Results by round ====
| Round | 1 | 2 | 3 | 4 | 5 | 6 | 7 | 8 | 9 | 10 | 11 | 12 | 13 | 14 | 15 | 16 | 17 | 18 | 19 | 20 | 21 | 22 | 23 | 24 | 25 | 26 | 27 | 28 | 29 | 30 | 31 | 32 | 33 | 34 |
|---|---|---|---|---|---|---|---|---|---|---|---|---|---|---|---|---|---|---|---|---|---|---|---|---|---|---|---|---|---|---|---|---|---|---|
| Ground | H | A | H | A | H | A | H | A | H | A | H | A | H | A | H | A | H | A | H | A | H | A | H | A | H | A | H | A | H | A | H | A | H | A |
| Result | L | W | L | W | L | L | L | W | D | D | D | D | L | D | L | L | D | D | W | D | D | L | D | L | L | D | W | D | W | L | W | W | W | D |
| Position | 17 | 8 | 12 | 6 | 9 | 12 | 14 | 9 | 11 | 11 | 10 | 9 | 11 | 12 | 14 | 17 | 16 | 15 | 16 | 16 | 16 | 16 | 17 | 18 | 18 | 18 | 14 | 16 | 15 | 15 | 15 | 10 | 9 | 9 |

Source: Soccerway
A = Away; H = Home; W = Win; D = Draw; L = Loss

==== Matches ====
| 3 August 2018 1 | ENPPI | 0–1 | Pyramids | Cairo |
| 21:00 CAT (UTC+2) | | Report | Magdy 90+4' | Stadium: Petro Sport Stadium; Referee: Mohamed Adel |

| 8 August 2018 2 | Tala'ea El Gaish | 0–3 | ENPPI | Cairo |
| 21:00 CAT (UTC+2) | | Report | H. Fathy 80'; Sadaoui 82', 90+3' | Stadium: Gehaz El Reyada Stadium; Referee: Mohamed Maarouf |

| 14 August 2018 3 | ENPPI | 2–3 | Smouha | Cairo |
| 18:15 CAT (UTC+2) | M. Bassiouny 12'; Arafa 75' | Report | Hassan 1'; Farid 29'; Sayed 79' | Stadium: Petro Sport Stadium; Referee: Amin Omar |

| 24 August 2018 4 | Al Mokawloon Al Arab | 1–2 | ENPPI | Cairo |
| 16:00 CAT (UTC+2) | Taher 52' | Report | Marshall 86'; Shika 90+2' | Stadium: Osman Ahmed Osman Stadium; Referee: Abdel Aziz El Sayed |

| 1 September 2018 5 | ENPPI | 1–4 | Zamalek | Cairo |
| 21:00 CAT (UTC+2) | Shika 90+1' | Report | Alaa 36' (pen.); Soliman 40' (o.g.); Hassan 58'; Kasongo 65' | Stadium: Petro Sport Stadium; Referee: Mohamed Maarouf |

| 13 September 2018 6 | Ismaily | 3–2 | ENPPI | Ismailia |
| 18:00 CAT (UTC+2) | Mendouga 11', 60'; Baffour 45' | Report | Roaa 24'; Kaoud 45+4' | Stadium: Ismailia Stadium; Referee: Mohamed El Sabahy |

| 24 September 2018 8 | Wadi Degla | 1–2 | ENPPI | Cairo |
| 18:00 CAT (UTC+2) | Marie 78' | Report | M. Bassiouny 39'; Marshall 58' | Stadium: Petro Sport Stadium; Referee: Mahmoud Nagy |

| 1 October 2018 9 | ENPPI | 0–0 | Haras El Hodoud | Cairo |
| 18:00 CAT (UTC+2) | | Report | | Stadium: Petro Sport Stadium; Referee: Ahmed Hamdy |

| 5 October 2018 10 | El Entag El Harby | 2–2 | ENPPI | Cairo |
| 18:00 CAT (UTC+2) | Kabonga 23'; Diawara 34' | Report | El Halwani 4'; Kaoud 50' | Stadium: Al Salam Stadium; Referee: Mahmoud Bassiouny |

| 19 October 2018 11 | ENPPI | 1–1 | El Dakhleya | Cairo |
| 21:00 CAT (UTC+2) | H. Fathy 36' | Report | Ragab 5' | Stadium: Petro Sport Stadium; Referee: Walid Abdel Razek |

| 2 November 2018 12 | El Gouna | 1–1 | ENPPI | El Gouna |
| 15:30 CAT (UTC+2) | Okka 15' (pen.) | Report | E. Fathy 40' | Stadium: El Gouna Stadium; Referee: Said Hamza |

| 11 November 2018 14 | Petrojet | 0–0 | ENPPI | Suez |
| 17:00 CAT (UTC+2) | | Report | | Stadium: Suez Stadium; Referee: Mahmoud El Banna |

| 20 November 2018 15 | ENPPI | 0–1 | Al Ittihad | Cairo |
| 18:00 CAT (UTC+2) | | Report | Cissé 24' | Stadium: Petro Sport Stadium; Referee: Mohamed Adel |

| 25 November 2018 16 | Misr Lel Makkasa | 4–3 | ENPPI | Cairo (Note: Misr Lel Makkasa v ENPPI match was played at Osman Ahmed Osman Stadium in Cairo instead of Faiyum Stadium in Faiyum due to pitch status.) |
| 15:15 CAT (UTC+2) | Antwi 33', 50', 62' (pen.); Dabash 37' | Report | Marshall 27', 45+1'; H. Fathy 53' | Stadium: Osman Ahmed Osman Stadium; Referee: Mohamed Youssef |

| 29 November 2018 (Note: ENPPI v Al Masry match, originally scheduled to be played on 19 September 2018, was postponed due to conflicting with Al Masry v USM Alger match in the CAF Confederation Cup, which was set to be played on 16 September 2018. The match was later rescheduled to be played on 29 November 2018.) 7 | ENPPI | 1–3 | Al Masry | Cairo |
| 19:00 CAT (UTC+2) | Marshall 2' | Report | Gomaa 43' (pen.); Issa 62'; Wadi 89' | Stadium: Petro Sport Stadium; Referee: Tarek Magdy |

| 12 December 2018 17 | ENPPI | 1–1 | Nogoom | Cairo |
| 19:30 CAT (UTC+2) | Marshall 6' | Report | Fathalla 56' (pen.) | Stadium: Petro Sport Stadium; Referee: Hesham El Fallal |

| 22 December 2018 18 | Pyramids | 1–1 | ENPPI | Cairo |
| 19:30 CAT (UTC+2) | Farouk 39' | Report | Sabry 22' | Stadium: 30 June Stadium; Referee: Redouane Jiyed (Morocco) |

| 9 January 2019 (Note: ENPPI v Tala'ea El Gaish match, originally scheduled to be played on 14 January 2019, was played on 9 January 2019 to avoid scheduling conflicts.) 19 | ENPPI | 1–0 | Tala'ea El Gaish | Cairo |
| 17:00 CAT (UTC+2) | Kaoud 32' | Report | | Stadium: Petro Sport Stadium; Referee: Amin Omar |

| 23 January 2019 20 | Smouha | 0–0 | ENPPI | Alexandria |
| 17:30 CAT (UTC+2) | | Report | | Stadium: Alexandria Stadium; Referee: Mahmoud Nagy |

| 30 January 2019 (Note: ENPPI v Al Mokawloon Al Arab match, originally scheduled to be played on 6 February 2019, was played on 30 January 2019 to avoid scheduling conflicts.) 21 | ENPPI | 0–0 | Al Mokawloon Al Arab | Cairo |
| 19:00 CAT (UTC+2) | | Report | | Stadium: Petro Sport Stadium; Referee: Ahmed El Adawy |

| 5 February 2019 (Note: ENPPI v Al Ahly match, originally scheduled to be played on 7 November 2018, was postponed due to conflicting with Espérance de Tunis v Al Ahly match in the CAF Champions League, which was set to be played on 9 November 2018. The match was later rescheduled to be played on 5 February 2019.) 13 | ENPPI | 1–2 | Al Ahly | Cairo |
| 18:00 CAT (UTC+2) | Kaoud 80' | Report | Ashraf 38'; Ajayi 54' | Stadium: Petro Sport Stadium; Referee: Mohamed El Sabahy |

| 17 February 2019 22 | Zamalek | 2–1 | ENPPI | Cairo |
| 18:00 CAT (UTC+2) | Boutaïb 21'; Kahraba 45+2' | Report | M. Bassiouny 56' | Stadium: Petro Sport Stadium; Referee: Tarek Magdy |

| 26 February 2019 24 | Al Masry | 3–1 | ENPPI | Suez (Note: Al Masry v ENPPI match was played at the Egyptian Army Stadium in Suez instead of Al Masry Club Stadium in Port Said due to security concerns.) |
| 17:30 CAT (UTC+2) | Wadi 13'; Amutu 74'; Issa 84' | Report | E. Fathy 47' | Stadium: Egyptian Army Stadium; Referee: Mahmoud Ashour |

| 3 March 2019 25 | ENPPI | 1–2 | Wadi Degla | Cairo |
| 19:00 CAT (UTC+2) | Bassam 90+5' | Report | Arafat 60'; Yakubu 74' | Stadium: Petro Sport Stadium; Referee: Nader Kamar El Dawla |

| 11 March 2019 26 | Haras El Hodoud | 0–0 | ENPPI | Alexandria |
| 17:30 CAT (UTC+2) | | Report | | Stadium: Haras El Hodoud Stadium; Referee: Amin Omar |

| 29 March 2019 (Note: ENPPI v Ismaily match, originally scheduled to be played on 21 February 2019, was postponed due to conflicting with Ismaily v CS Constantine match in the CAF Champions League, which was set to be played on 23 February 2019. The match was later rescheduled to be played on 29 March 2019.) 23 | ENPPI | 0–0 | Ismaily | Cairo |
| 19:00 CAT (UTC+2) | | Report | | Stadium: Petro Sport Stadium; Referee: Mohamed Maarouf |

| 2 April 2019 27 | ENPPI | 1–0 | El Entag El Harby | Cairo |
| 17:00 CAT (UTC+2) | Shoukry 9' | Report | | Stadium: Petro Sport Stadium; Referee: Ahmed Hamdy |

| 7 April 2019 28 | El Dakhleya | 1–1 | ENPPI | Cairo |
| 17:30 CAT (UTC+2) | Salem 69' | Report | Refaat 37' (pen.) | Stadium: Police Academy Stadium; Referee: Mahmoud El Banna |

| 15 April 2019 29 | ENPPI | 4–0 | El Gouna | Cairo |
| 20:00 CAT (UTC+2) | Kaoud 9'; Refaat 26' (pen.); Ghaly 64'; Lukombe 89' | Report | | Stadium: Petro Sport Stadium; Referee: Mohamed Adel |

| 2 May 2019 31 | ENPPI | 2–1 | Petrojet | Cairo |
| 19:00 CAT (UTC+2) | Sabry 61', 90+2' | Report | Naguib 73' (pen.) | Stadium: Petro Sport Stadium; Referee: Tarek Magdy |

| 10 May 2019 32 | Al Ittihad | 0–1 | ENPPI | Alexandria |
| 22:00 CAT (UTC+2) | | Report | Fawzy 28' | Stadium: Haras El Hodoud Stadium (Note: Al Ittihad v ENPPI match was played at Haras El Hodoud Stadium instead of Borg El Arab Stadium due to pitch status.); Referee: Mohamed Maarouf |

| 16 May 2019 (Note: Al Ahly v ENPPI match, originally scheduled to be played on 25 April 2019, was postponed due to security concerns. The match was later rescheduled to be played on 16 May 2019.) 30 | Al Ahly | 2–0 | ENPPI | Cairo |
| 22:00 CAT (UTC+2) | El Shahat 4'; M. Mohsen 90+4' | Report | | Stadium: Petro Sport Stadium; Referee: Mohamed Adel |

| 21 May 2019 33 | ENPPI | 2–1 | Misr Lel Makkasa | Cairo |
| 22:00 CAT (UTC+2) | Shoukry 23', 42' | Report | Gaber 54' (pen.) | Stadium: Petro Sport Stadium; Referee: Mahmoud Ashour |

| 27 May 2019 34 | Nogoom | 1–1 | ENPPI | Cairo |
| 22:00 CAT (UTC+2) | Amin 57' | Report | O. Fathy 67' | Stadium: Petro Sport Stadium; Referee: Ahmed Gamal |

=== Egypt Cup ===
| 9 October 2018 Round of 32 | ENPPI | 3–0 | Muslim Youths (Qena) | Cairo |
| 18:00 CAT (UTC+2) | Sadaoui 10'; Kaoud 31', 34' | Report | | Stadium: Petro Sport Stadium; Referee: Hosny Sultan |

| 27 October 2018 Round of 16 | ENPPI | 4–2 | El Mansoura | Cairo (Note: Starting from round of 16, all matches will be played on stadiums selected by the Egyptian Football Association.) |
| 17:00 CAT (UTC+2) | E. Fathy 10'; Sabry 17' (pen.); Sadaoui 21'; Kaoud 27' | Report | Abdel Samie 69'; Nagati 75' | Stadium: Osman Ahmed Osman Stadium; Referee: Tarek Magdy |

| 3 January 2019 Quarter-finals | Petrojet | 2–1 (a.e.t.) | ENPPI | Cairo |
| 16:00 CAT (UTC+2) | Mao 89', 95' | Report | Bassam 49' | Stadium: Osman Ahmed Osman Stadium; Referee: Walid Abdel Aziz |

== Statistics ==
=== Appearances and goals ===
| No. | Pos | Player | Egyptian Premier League | | Egypt Cup | | Total | |
| No. | Pos | Player | Apps | Goals | Apps | Goals | Apps | Goals |
|---|---|---|---|---|---|---|---|---|
| 1 | GK | (Egypt) Abdel Aziz El Baalouti | 18 | 0 | 0 | 0 | 18 | 0 |
| 2 | DF | (Egypt) Ali Fawzy | 28 | 1 | 2 | 0 | 30 | 1 |
| 3 | MF | (Mali) Aboubacar Diarra | 0+4 | 0 | 0 | 0 | 4 | 0 |
| 4 | DF | (Egypt) Ibrahim Yehia | 17+1 | 0 | 0+1 | 0 | 19 | 0 |
| 5 | DF | (Egypt) Mahmoud Shabana | 0 | 0 | 1 | 0 | 1 | 0 |
| 6 | MF | (Egypt) Salah Soliman | 8 | 0 | 2 | 0 | 10 | 0 |
| 7 | FW | (Egypt) Ahmed Refaat | 11+2 | 2 | 0 | 0 | 13 | 2 |
| 8 | DF | (Egypt) Ramy Sabry | 32 | 3 | 3 | 1 | 35 | 4 |
| 9 | FW | (Egypt) Arafa El Sayed | 5 | 1 | 0 | 0 | 5 | 1 |
| 10 | FW | (Democratic Republic of the Congo) Chadrack Lukombe | 9+3 | 1 | 0 | 0 | 12 | 1 |
| 11 | FW | (Egypt) Mohamed Bassiouny | 22+6 | 3 | 1 | 0 | 29 | 3 |
| 12 | MF | (Egypt) Mahmoud Tobah | 7+8 | 0 | 1+1 | 0 | 17 | 0 |
| 13 | FW | (Tanzania) Shiza Kichuya | 1+2 | 0 | 0 | 0 | 3 | 0 |
| 14 | MF | (Egypt) Mohamed Ashraf Roaa | 25+2 | 1 | 2 | 0 | 29 | 1 |
| 15 | DF | (Egypt) Abdel Rahman Amer | 16+1 | 0 | 1+1 | 0 | 19 | 0 |
| 16 | GK | (Egypt) Amr Hossam | 11+1 | 0 | 1 | 0 | 13 | 0 |
| 17 | FW | (Ivory Coast) Wilfried Yessoh | 2+4 | 0 | 0 | 0 | 6 | 0 |
| 18 | FW | (Egypt) Mohamed Shika | 8+8 | 2 | 1 | 0 | 17 | 2 |
| 19 | DF | (Egypt) Ahmed Abdel Aziz | 15 | 0 | 3 | 0 | 18 | 0 |
| 20 | FW | (Egypt) Mahmoud Kaoud | 24+5 | 5 | 3 | 3 | 32 | 8 |
| 21 | FW | (Egypt) Ahmed Abdel Fattah | 1+5 | 0 | 0 | 0 | 6 | 0 |
| 22 | DF | (Egypt) Amr El Halwani | 16+3 | 1 | 0 | 0 | 19 | 1 |
| 23 | MF | (Egypt) Emad Fathy | 15+7 | 2 | 2 | 1 | 24 | 3 |
| 24 | MF | (Egypt) Mahmoud Ghaly | 14+4 | 1 | 0+1 | 0 | 19 | 1 |
| 26 | DF | (Egypt) Ahmed Saber | 11+1 | 0 | 0 | 0 | 12 | 0 |
| 27 | MF | (Egypt) Mohamed Morsy | 0 | 0 | 0 | 0 | 0 | 0 |
| 28 | FW | (Egypt) Ahmed Shoukry | 11+2 | 3 | 0 | 0 | 13 | 3 |
| 29 | MF | (Egypt) Omar Fathy | 0+6 | 1 | 0 | 0 | 6 | 1 |
| 30 | FW | (Egypt) Omar Bassam | 5+3 | 1 | 1 | 1 | 9 | 2 |
| 31 | DF | (Egypt) Mostafa Adel | 0 | 0 | 0 | 0 | 0 | 0 |
| 32 | MF | (Egypt) Khaled Bassiouny | 0 | 0 | 0 | 0 | 0 | 0 |
| 33 | GK | (Egypt) Mahmoud Gad | 5 | 0 | 2 | 0 | 7 | 0 |
| 34 | MF | (Egypt) Hesham Adel | 1+3 | 0 | 0 | 0 | 4 | 0 |
| 35 | MF | (Egypt) Ahmed Hussein | 0 | 0 | 0+2 | 0 | 2 | 0 |
| 36 | DF | (Egypt) Mohamed Ragab | 0 | 0 | 1+1 | 0 | 2 | 0 |
| 37 | MF | (Egypt) Mohamed Ashraf | 1+3 | 0 | 0 | 0 | 4 | 0 |
| 38 | MF | (Egypt) Ahmed Youssef | 0+1 | 0 | 0+1 | 0 | 2 | 0 |
| 42 | MF | (Egypt) Ahmed Kasim | 0 | 0 | 1 | 0 | 1 | 0 |
Players transferred out during the season
| 7 | FW | (United States) Noah Sadaoui | 6+9 | 2 | 2 | 2 | 17 | 4 |
| 10 | FW | (Nigeria) Odah Marshall | 8+5 | 6 | 1 | 0 | 14 | 6 |
| 13 | DF | (Burkina Faso) Yaya Sanou | 0+3 | 0 | 1 | 0 | 4 | 0 |
| 17 | MF | (Egypt) Hamdy Fathy | 16 | 3 | 1 | 0 | 17 | 3 |
| 25 | DF | (Egypt) Fady Nagah | 5 | 0 | 0 | 0 | 5 | 0 |
| 29 | DF | (Egypt) Samir Fekri | 0 | 0 | 0 | 0 | 0 | 0 |
| 40 | FW | (Egypt) Abdel Rahman Bogi | 0 | 0 | 0 | 0 | 0 | 0 |

=== Goalscorers ===
| Rank | Position | Name | Egyptian Premier League | Egypt Cup | Total |
|---|---|---|---|---|---|
| 1 | FW | (Egypt) Mahmoud Kaoud | 5 | 3 | 8 |
| 2 | FW | (Nigeria) Odah Marshall | 6 | 0 | 6 |
| 3 | DF | (Egypt) Ramy Sabry | 3 | 1 | 4 |
| 3 | FW | (United States) Noah Sadaoui | 2 | 2 | 4 |
| 5 | FW | (Egypt) Mohamed Bassiouny | 3 | 0 | 3 |
| 5 | MF | (Egypt) Emad Fathy | 2 | 1 | 3 |
| 5 | MF | (Egypt) Hamdy Fathy | 3 | 0 | 3 |
| 5 | FW | (Egypt) Ahmed Shoukry | 3 | 0 | 3 |
| 9 | FW | (Egypt) Omar Bassam | 1 | 1 | 2 |
| 9 | FW | (Egypt) Ahmed Refaat | 2 | 0 | 2 |
| 9 | FW | (Egypt) Mohamed Shika | 2 | 0 | 2 |
| 12 | MF | (Egypt) Omar Fathy | 1 | 0 | 1 |
| 12 | DF | (Egypt) Ali Fawzy | 1 | 0 | 1 |
| 12 | MF | (Egypt) Mahmoud Ghaly | 1 | 0 | 1 |
| 12 | FW | (Democratic Republic of the Congo) Chadrack Lukombe | 1 | 0 | 1 |
| 12 | DF | (Egypt) Amr El Halwani | 1 | 0 | 1 |
| 12 | MF | (Egypt) Mohamed Ashraf Roaa | 1 | 0 | 1 |
| 12 | FW | (Egypt) Arafa El Sayed | 1 | 0 | 1 |
| Own goal | | | 0 | 0 | 0 |
| Total | | | 39 | 8 | 47 |

=== Clean sheets ===
| Rank | Name | Egyptian Premier League | Egypt Cup | Total |
|---|---|---|---|---|
| 1 | (Egypt) Abdel Aziz El Baalouti | 6 | 0 | 6 |
| 2 | (Egypt) Amr Hossam | 4 | 0 | 4 |
| 3 | (Egypt) Mahmoud Gad | 1 | 1 | 2 |
| Total | | 11 | 1 | 12 |
