= 2022–23 Haras El Hodoud SC season =

Haras El Hodoud SC
2022–23 season
- Chairman: Basem Riad Hilal
- Manager: Mohammad Mekky
- Stadium: Haras El Hodoud Stadium
- Egyptian Premier League: 18th (relegated)
- Egypt Cup: Round of 16
- EFA Cup: Quarter-finals
- Top goalscorer: League: Mostafa Ziko (6); All: Mostafa Ziko (6)

The 2022–23 Haras El Hodoud SC season was the club's 91st season in existence and the first season back in the topflight of Egyptian football since 2020. In addition to the domestic league, Haras El Hodoud participated in this season's editions of the Egypt Cup and the EFA Cup.

== Players ==
=== First-team squad ===
Note: Flags indicate national team as defined under FIFA eligibility rules; some limited exceptions apply. Players may hold more than one non-FIFA nationality.

No.	Pos.	Nation	Player
1	GK	EGY	Sameh Ali
4	DF	EGY	Mohamed El Shebini
5	DF	EGY	Khaled Samy
6	DF	EGY	Mohamed Abdel Fattah
8	FW	CIV	Ibrahim Koné
9	FW	EGY	Ali Hussien Ahmed Hussien
10	MF	EGY	Ahmed El Sheikh
11	MF	EGY	Mohamed Tarek
12	MF	EGY	Ahmed Waleed Fahim
13	GK	EGY	Loay elsayed
14	MF	EGY	Mostafa Gamal
15	DF	EGY	Hassan Magdy

No.	Pos.	Nation	Player
16	GK	EGY	Mossad Awad
17	MF	EGY	Ashour El Adham
18	DF	EGY	Abdallah Gomaa Awad
19	FW	CMR	Cyrille Ndaney
20	FW	LBR	Amadaiya Rennie
23	DF	EGY	Gehad Genadi
24	MF	EGY	Ahmed Felix
32	FW	NGR	Edu Moses
33	MF	EGY	Abdelrahman Khalil
35	DF	EGY	Ahmed Hany
55	MF	EGY	Gharib Yasser
90	FW	EGY	Emam Ashour (on loan from Ghazl El Mahalla SC)

== Pre-season and friendlies ==
Win Draw Loss Fixtures

26 July 2022 Friendly	Haras El Hodoud (Egypt)	2–0	(Tanzania) Simba	Alexandria
		Report		Stadium: Haras El Hodoud Stadium

29 July 2022 Friendly	Haras El Hodoud (Egypt)	0–0	(Saudi Arabia) Al-Okhdood	Alexandria
		Report		Stadium: Haras El Hodoud Stadium

4 August 2022 Friendly	El Sekka El Hadid (Egypt)	1–1	(Egypt) Haras El Hodoud	Cairo

10 August 2022 Friendly	Haras El Hodoud (Egypt)	3–0	(Saudi Arabia) Al-Okhdood	Cairo
		Report

22 August 2022 Friendly	Petrojet (Egypt)	2–0	(Egypt) Haras El Hodoud	Cairo
		Report

30 August 2022 Friendly	Haras El Hodoud (Egypt)	2–0	(Egypt) Kima Aswan	Cairo
		Report

8 September 2022 Friendly	Al Nasr (Egypt)	2–2	(Egypt) Haras El Hodoud	Cairo
		Report

28 September 2022 Friendly	Haras El Hodoud (Egypt)	1–0	(Egypt) El Qanah	Alexandria
	Ziko	Report

1 October 2022 Friendly	Smouha (Egypt)	1–1	(Egypt) Haras El Hodoud	Alexandria
	Nadi	Report	Gomaa

3 October 2022 Friendly	Haras El Hodoud (Egypt)	1–2	(Egypt) ENPPI	Alexandria
	55'		Magdy (pen.); Zayed	Stadium: Haras El Hodoud Stadium

4 October 2022 Friendly	Haras El Hodoud (Egypt)	1–2	(Egypt) Al Mokawloon Al Arab	Alexandria
		Report		Stadium: Haras El Hodoud Stadium

9 October 2022 Friendly	Ghazl El Mahalla (Egypt)	0–1	(Egypt) Haras El Hodoud
			Coco

9 November 2022 Friendly	National Bank (Egypt)	0–0	(Egypt) Haras El Hodoud	Cairo
		Report		Stadium: Police Academy Stadium

13 November 2022 Friendly	Al Masry (Egypt)	0–0	(Egypt) Haras El Hodoud	Cairo

15 March 2023 Friendly	Ismaily (Egypt)	2–2	(Egypt) Haras El Hodoud	Cairo
	Al-Saei; Hassan		Mamdouh; Ziko (pen.)

21 March 2023 Friendly	Haras El Hodoud (Egypt)	2–1	(Egypt) Aswan
		Report

== Competitions ==
=== Overview ===
Competition	First match	Last match	Starting round	Final position	Record							
Competition	First match	Last match	Starting round	Final position	Pld	W	D	L	GF	GA	GD	Win %
Egyptian Premier League	20 October 2022	19 July 2023	Matchday 1	18th	34	5	10	19	16	41	−25	14.71
Egypt Cup	28 May 2023	6 July 2023	Round of 32	Round of 16	2	1	0	1	5	5	+0	50.00
EFA Cup	19 November 2022	30 April 2023	Preliminary round	Quarter-finals	3	1	1	1	2	2	+0	33.33
Total					39	7	11	21	23	48	−25	17.95

Source: Soccerway

=== Egyptian Premier League ===
==== League table ====
Pos	Team	Pld	W	D	L	GF	GA	GD	Pts	Qualification or relegation
14	Tala'ea El Gaish	34	8	12	14	33	45	−12	36	
15	El Dakhleya	34	7	14	13	32	43	−11	35	
16	Aswan (R)	34	8	9	17	31	45	−14	33 (Note: Tied on head-to-head points (3) and on head-to-head goal difference (0). Overall goal difference: Aswan −14, Ghazl El Mahalla −21.)	Relegation to Second Division A
17	Ghazl El Mahalla (R)	34	8	9	17	26	47	−21	33	Relegation to Second Division A
18	Haras El Hodoud (R)	34	5	10	19	21	45	−24	25	Relegation to Second Division A

Source: Soccerway
Rules for classification: 1) Points; 2) Head-to-head points; 3) Head-to-head goal difference; 4) Goal difference; 5) Goals scored; 6) Play-off.
(R) Relegated

==== Results summary ====
Overall								Home						Away					
Pld	W	D	L	GF	GA	GD	Pts	W	D	L	GF	GA	GD	W	D	L	GF	GA	GD
34	5	10	19	21	45	−24	25	4	5	8	11	20	−9	1	5	11	10	25	−15

Source: worldfootball

==== Results by round ====
Round	1	2	3	4	5	6	7	8	9	10	11	12	13	14	15	16	17	18	19	20	21	22	23	24	25	26	27	28	29	30	31	32	33	34
Ground	H	A	H	A	H	A	H	A	H	A	A	H	A	H	A	H	A	A	H	A	H	A	H	A	H	A	H	H	A	H	A	H	A	H
Result	L	L	D	L	L	D	D	L	W	D	L	W	D	L	L	L	W	L	D	L	D	L	L	L	L	L	L	L	L	W	D	D	D	W
Position	16	18	15	16	17	17	17	18	18	17	18	16	15	16	17	18	15	16	16	17	18	18	18	18	18	18	18	18	18	18	18	18	18	18

Source: worldfootball
A = Away; H = Home; W = Win; D = Draw; L = Loss

==== Matches ====
The league fixtures were announced on 9 October 2022.

20 October 2022 1	Haras El Hodoud	0–2	Future	Alexandria
17:00 EST (UTC+2)		Report	El Said 75'; Barry 87'	Stadium: Haras El Hodoud Stadium; Referee: Mohamed El Hanafi

26 October 2022 2	Pharco	1–0	Haras El Hodoud	Alexandria
17:00 EST (UTC+2)	Sherif 90+2'	Report		Stadium: Alexandria Stadium; Referee: Mostafa Othman

1 November 2022 3	Haras El Hodoud	0–0	Smouha	Alexandria
17:00 EST (UTC+2)		Report		Stadium: Haras El Hodoud Stadium; Referee: Ibrahim Nour El Din

30 November 2022 5	Haras El Hodoud	0–1	Pyramids	Alexandria
14:45 EST (UTC+2)		Report	Lakay 54' (pen.)	Stadium: Haras El Hodoud Stadium; Referee: Mohamed Al Ghazi

8 December 2022 6	ENPPI	0–0	Haras El Hodoud	Cairo
14:45 EST (UTC+2)		Report		Stadium: Petrosport Stadium; Referee: Mahmoud Nassif

12 December 2022 4	Ceramica Cleopatra	2–1	Haras El Hodoud	Cairo
14:45 EST (UTC+2)	Rayan 16'; Kalawa 39'	Report	Ziko 90+5'	Stadium: Cairo International Stadium; Referee: Mohammad Sabahi

16 December 2022 7	Haras El Hodoud	0–0	Al Masry	Suez
14:45 EST (UTC+2)		Report		Stadium: Suez Stadium; Referee: Wael Farhan

20 December 2022 8	Zamalek	4–0	Haras El Hodoud	Cairo
19:00 EST (UTC+2)	Osama 15'; Zizo 55', (penalty missed) 88', 88'; Shikabala 78'	Report		Stadium: Cairo International Stadium; Referee: Mahmoud Nagi

24 December 2022 9	Haras El Hodoud	2–1	National Bank	Alexandria
17:00 EST (UTC+2)	Bassam (yellow card) 30'; Gamal 41' (pen.); Sobhi (yellow card) 48'; Felix 55'	Report	Bambo 45+2' (pen.)	Stadium: Haras El Hodoud Stadium; Referee: Mohamed Salama

28 December 2022 10	Tala'ea El Gaish	2–2	Haras El Hodoud	Cairo
17:00 EST (UTC+2)	Osama (yellow card) 44'; Mohareb 52', 64'	Report	Meteb 4' (o.g.); Sobhi 11'; Gamal (penalty missed) 69'	Stadium: Gehaz El Reyada Stadium; Referee: Walid Abdelrazek

3 January 2023 11	Al Mokawloon Al Arab	3–2	Haras El Hodoud	Cairo
17:00 EST (UTC+2)	Okoli 4'; Khaled (yellow card) 31'; El Sayed (yellow card) 49'; Ochaya 56' (pen.); Saviola 68', (yellow card) 72' (yellow-red card) 85'	Report	Bassam 13'; Ziko 29' (pen.); Ramadan (yellow card) 38'; Fawzi (yellow card) 55'; Abdel Hakim (yellow card) 90+5'	Stadium: Osman Ahmed Osman Stadium; Referee: Mohamed Adel

8 January 2023 12	Haras El Hodoud	2–0	Ismaily	Cairo
14:45 EST (UTC+2)	Ziko 3', 59'; Sami (yellow card) 77'	Report	Hamdy (yellow card) 64'	Stadium: Cairo Military Academy Stadium; Referee: Mohammed Yousef
Note: The match was moved from Haras El Hodoud Stadium, at the request of both teams.

13 January 2023 13	Aswan	1–1	Haras El Hodoud	Aswan
14:45 EST (UTC+2)	Zaki (yellow card) 36'; Atwa (yellow card) 73'; Nagy 90+1'	Report	Gamal 74' (pen.); Mahmoud (yellow card) 81'	Stadium: Aswan Stadium; Referee: Mohamed Kabil

18 January 2023 14	Haras El Hodoud	0–1	El Dakhleya	Alexandria
14:45 EST (UTC+2)		Report	Fawzy (yellow card) 66'; Atef 74'; Dahesh (yellow card) 87'	Stadium: Haras El Hodoud Stadium; Referee: Abdelaziz El Sayed

23 January 2023 15	Al Ittihad	1–0	Haras El Hodoud	Alexandria
19:00 EST (UTC+2)	Amutu (yellow card) 69'; Alaa 84' (pen.)	Report	Ziko (yellow card) 82'; Sami (yellow card) 82'	Stadium: Alexandria Stadium; Referee: Nader Kamar

5 February 2023 17	Ghazl El Mahalla	1–2	Haras El Hodoud	El Mahalla El Kubra
14:45 EST (UTC+2)	El Sheikh 90+4'	Report	Felix 15'; Ziko 44'	Stadium: Ghazl El Mahalla Stadium; Referee: Sabri Ibrahim

16 February 2023 18	Future	1–0	Haras El Hodoud	Cairo
17:00 EST (UTC+2)	El Saadani 84' (o.g.)	Report		Stadium: Al Salam Stadium; Referee: Wael Farhan

21 February 2023 19	Haras El Hodoud	0–0	Pharco	Alexandria
19:00 EST (UTC+2)		Report		Stadium: Haras El Hodoud Stadium; Referee: Hisham Al-Falal

26 February 2023 20	Smouha	3–0	Haras El Hodoud	Borg El Arab
17:00 EST (UTC+2)	Hassan 12', 87' (pen.); Boateng 90+5'	Report		Stadium: Borg El Arab Stadium; Referee: Galal Ahmed

5 March 2023 21	Haras El Hodoud	0–0	Ceramica Cleopatra	Alexandria
18:00 EST (UTC+2)		Report		Stadium: Haras El Hodoud Stadium; Referee: Amin Omar

3 April 2023 23	Haras El Hodoud	0–1	ENPPI	Alexandria
21:15 EST (UTC+2)		Report	El Tayeeb 48'	Stadium: Haras El Hodoud Stadium; Referee: Mohamed Kabil

7 April 2023 24	Al Masry	1–0	Haras El Hodoud	Borg El Arab
21:15 EST (UTC+2)	El Saadawy 63'	Report		Stadium: Borg El Arab Stadium; Referee: Mahmoud Ashour

13 April 2023 25	Haras El Hodoud	0–3	Zamalek	Cairo
21:15 EST (UTC+2)		Report	Mansi 14'; Abdul-Majeed 45+2'; Belhadji 90+1'	Stadium: Cairo Military Academy Stadium; Referee: Ahmed El Ghandour

19 April 2023 26	National Bank	1–0	Haras El Hodoud	Cairo
21:15 EST (UTC+2)	Sayeed 21'	Report		Stadium: Cairo International Stadium; Referee: Walid Abdelrazek

4 May 2023 27	Haras El Hodoud	2–3	Tala'ea El Gaish	Alexandria
19:00 EST (UTC+2)	David 6'; Ziko 15' (pen.)	Report	Tarek 48'; Wadi 78'; Abdel Rahman 90+5'	Stadium: Haras El Hodoud Stadium; Referee: Mahmoud Ashour
Note: The game, which was initially slated for 24 April 2023, was postponed.

16 May 2023 28	Haras El Hodoud	0–2	Al Mokawloon Al Arab	Alexandria
17:00 EST (UTC+3)		Report	Salem 6'; Okoli 43'	Stadium: Haras El Hodoud Stadium; Referee: Sayed Shabaan

21 May 2023 29	Ismaily	1–0	Haras El Hodoud	Ismailia
19:00 EST (UTC+3)	El Shamy 54'	Report		Stadium: Ismailia Stadium; Referee: Mahmoud Nagi

24 May 2023 22	Pyramids	1–0	Haras El Hodoud	Cairo
21:30 EST (UTC+3)	Lakay (penalty missed) 58'; El Gabbas 90+4'	Report		Stadium: 30 June Stadium; Referee: Ibrahim Nour El Din
Note: The game, which was initially slated for 14 March 2023, was postponed.

1 June 2023 30	Haras El Hodoud	1–0	Aswan	Alexandria
19:00 EST (UTC+2)	El Kadi 52'	Report		Stadium: Haras El Hodoud Stadium; Referee: Wael Farhan

6 June 2023 31	El Dakhleya	1–1	Haras El Hodoud	Cairo
19:00 EST (UTC+3)	Ahmed 64'	Report	Abdallah 90+2'	Stadium: Police Academy Stadium; Referee: Mohammed Yousef

22 June 2023 16	Haras El Hodoud	0–3	Al Ahly	Cairo
21:30 EST (UTC+2)		Report	Benwali 4' (o.g.); Abdel Kader 56'; Mohamed 64'	Stadium: Cairo Military Academy Stadium; Referee: Amin Omar
Note: The game, which was initially slated for 29 January 2023, was postponed because Al Ahly competed in the 2022 FIFA Club World Cup.

1 July 2023 32	Haras El Hodoud	2–2	Al Ittihad	Alexandria
20:30 EST (UTC+2)	Gamal 42'; Mamdouh 90+9'	Report	Mabululu 73', 80'	Stadium: Haras El Hodoud Stadium; Referee: Sayed Munir

14 July 2023 33	Haras El Hodoud	2–1	Ghazl El Mahalla	Alexandria
20:30 EST (UTC+2)	Ramadan 9'; Mamdouh 90'	Report	El Sheikh 15' (pen.)	Stadium: Haras El Hodoud Stadium; Referee: Mahmoud Ashour

19 July 2023 34	Al Ahly	1–1	Haras El Hodoud	Cairo
20:30 EST (UTC+2)	Kahraba 71'	Report	Abdel Fattah 80' (o.g.)	Stadium: Cairo International Stadium; Referee: Mohamed El Hanafi

=== Egypt Cup ===
28 May 2023 Round of 32	Haras El Hodoud	3–2	Ghazl El Mahalla	Alexandria
19:00 EST (UTC+3)	Benwali 7'; Abdel Hakim 18', 69'		Orok 13', 22'	Stadium: Haras El Hodoud Stadium; Referee: Mahmoud Nassef

6 July 2023 (Note: The Al Masry v Haras El Hodoud match, originally scheduled to be played between 22 and 24 June 2023, was postponed to avoid scheduling conflicts with Haras El Hodoud's fixtures in the 2022–23 Egyptian Premier League.) Round of 16	Al Masry	3–2 (a.e.t.)	Haras El Hodoud	Alexandria
20:30 EST (UTC+3)	Yehia 46'; Jelassi 90' (pen.); Etouga 114'	Report	Valentine 36'; David 59'	Stadium: Borg El Arab Stadium; Referee: Ahmed Hamdy

=== EFA Cup ===
19 November 2022 Preliminary round	El Dakhleya	1–2 (a.e.t.)	Haras El Hodoud	Suez
18:00 EST (UTC+2)	Alfred 77'		Gamal 71' (pen.); Emmanuel 111'	Stadium: Suez Stadium

19 March 2023 Round of 16	Al Mokawloon Al Arab	0–0 (a.e.t.) (5–6 p)	Haras El Hodoud	Cairo
17:00 EST (UTC+2)				Stadium: Osman Ahmed Osman Stadium

30 April 2023 Quarter-finals	Haras El Hodoud	0–1	Future	Cairo
21:00 EST (UTC+2)			El Kadi 10' (o.g.)	Stadium: Cairo International Stadium
