= 2022–23 Al Mokawloon Al Arab SC season =

Al Mokawloon Al Arab SC
2022–23 season
- Chairman: Mohsen Salah
- Manager: Shawky Gharieb
- Stadium: Osman Ahmed Osman Stadium
- Egyptian Premier League: 7th
- Egypt Cup: Quarter-finals
- EFA Cup: Round of 16
- Top goalscorer: League: John Okoli (9); All: John Okoli (10)

The 2022–23 Al Mokawloon Al Arab SC season was the club's 50th season in existence and the 18th consecutive season in the topflight of Egyptian football. In addition to the domestic league, Al Mokawloon Al Arab participated in this season's editions of the Egypt Cup and the EFA Cup.

== Players ==
=== First-team squad ===
Note: Flags indicate national team as defined under FIFA eligibility rules; some limited exceptions apply. Players may hold more than one non-FIFA nationality.

| No. | Pos. | Nation | Player |
|---|---|---|---|
| 1 | GK | EGY | Mahmoud Abou El Saoud |
| 2 | DF | EGY | Amir Abed |
| 3 | MF | EGY | Ahmed Magdy |
| 4 | DF | EGY | Mohamed Samir |
| 5 | MF | EGY | Ibrahim Salah |
| 7 | FW | EGY | Mohamed Hamdi |
| 8 | DF | EGY | Fady Nagah |
| 9 | FW | EGY | Mohamed Salem |
| 10 | MF | EGY | Karim Mostafa |
| 11 | MF | EGY | Hassan El Shami |
| 12 | DF | EGY | Abdel Rahman Farouk |
| 13 | DF | EGY | Ahmed Abdelaziz |
| 14 | FW | EGY | Gebna |
| 15 | MF | EGY | Ahmed Kabouria |
| 16 | GK | EGY | Hassan Mahmoud Shahin |

| No. | Pos. | Nation | Player |
|---|---|---|---|
| 17 | MF | EGY | Ahmed Dawouda |
| 18 | GK | EGY | Ahmed El Arabi |
| 19 | MF | EGY | Mohamed Magli |
| 20 | MF | EGY | Ahmed El Shimi |
| 21 | DF | BFA | Farouck Kabore |
| 22 | MF | EGY | Abdallah Yaisien |
| 23 | FW | EGY | Omar Bassam |
| 24 | FW | COL | Luis Hinestroza |
| 25 | MF | EGY | Ahmed Shokry |
| 26 | DF | EGY | Basem Ali |
| 27 | DF | EGY | Ibrahim Adel |
| 28 | FW | NGR | John Okoli |
| 29 | DF | EGY | Khaled El Husseini |
| 30 | MF | EGY | Emad Fathy |

== Transfers ==
=== In ===
| No. | Pos | Player | Transferred from | Fee | Date | Source |
|---|---|---|---|---|---|---|
| 23 | DF | (Uganda) Joseph Ochaya | (Democratic Republic of the Congo) Mazempe | Free | 17 September 2022 | |
| | FW | (Egypt) Mahmoud Fahmy | (Egypt) Misr Lel Makkasa | Undisclosed | 21 September 2022 | |

=== Out ===
| No. | Pos | Player | Transferred to | Fee | Date | Source |
|---|---|---|---|---|---|---|
| | MF | (France) Abdallah Yaisien | (Egypt) Future | Free | 21 September 2022 | |
| | MF | (Egypt) Karim Mostafa | (Egypt) Ghazl El Mahalla | Free | 22 September 2022 | |

== Pre-season and friendlies ==
Win Draw Loss Fixtures

| 2 October 2022 Friendly | Al Mokawloon Al Arab (Egypt) | 1–0 | (Egypt) Kahrabaa Ismailia | Borg El Arab |

| 3 October 2022 Friendly | Al Mokawloon Al Arab (Egypt) | 3–2 | (Egypt) Petrojet | Borg El Arab |
| | Salem; Farid; El Shimi |

| 4 October 2022 Friendly | Haras El Hodoud (Egypt) | 1–2 | (Egypt) Al Mokawloon Al Arab | Alexandria |
| | | Report | | Stadium: Haras El Hodoud Stadium |

| 10 October 2022 Friendly | ENPPI (Egypt) | 1–2 | (Egypt) Al Mokawloon Al Arab |
| | | | Saviola; Farid |

| 11 October 2022 Friendly | Tala'ea El Gaish (Egypt) | 1–2 | (Egypt) Al Mokawloon Al Arab |
| | Goal | | Kabore; Niass |

| 9 November 2022 Friendly | Al Mokawloon Al Arab (Egypt) | 3–0 | (Egypt) Alexandria Sporting Club |
| | Farid; Okoli; Wael | Report |

== Competitions ==
=== Overview ===
| Competition | First match | Last match | Starting round | Final position | Record | | | | | | | |
| Competition | First match | Last match | Starting round | Final position | Pld | W | D | L | GF | GA | GD | Win % |
|---|---|---|---|---|---|---|---|---|---|---|---|---|
| Egyptian Premier League | 20 October 2022 | 16 July 2023 | Matchday 1 | 7th | 34 | 9 | 17 | 8 | 35 | 33 | +2 | 26.47 |
| Egypt Cup | 8 May 2023 | 4 July 2023 | Round of 32 | Quarter-finals | 3 | 2 | 0 | 1 | 6 | 4 | +2 | 66.67 |
| EFA Cup | 19 March 2023 | | Round of 16 | Round of 16 | 1 | 0 | 1 | 0 | 0 | 0 | +0 | 0.00 |
| Total | | | | | 38 | 11 | 18 | 9 | 41 | 37 | +4 | 28.95 |

Source: Soccerway

=== Egyptian Premier League ===
==== League table ====
| Pos | Team | Pld | W | D | L | GF | GA | GD | Pts |
|---|---|---|---|---|---|---|---|---|---|
| 5 | Al Masry | 34 | 11 | 15 | 8 | 34 | 33 | +1 | 48 |
| 6 | ENPPI | 34 | 13 | 6 | 15 | 34 | 40 | −6 | 45 |
| 7 | Al Mokawloon Al Arab | 34 | 9 | 17 | 8 | 35 | 33 | +2 | 44 |
| 8 | Al Ittihad | 34 | 12 | 7 | 15 | 36 | 43 | −7 | 43 |
| 9 | Pharco | 34 | 9 | 15 | 10 | 31 | 34 | −3 | 42 (Note: Head-to-head points: Pharco 6, Smouha 0.) |

Source: Soccerway
Rules for classification: 1) Points; 2) Head-to-head points; 3) Head-to-head goal difference; 4) Goal difference; 5) Goals scored; 6) Play-off.

==== Results summary ====
| Overall | | | | | | | | Home | | | | | | Away | | | | | |
| Pld | W | D | L | GF | GA | GD | Pts | W | D | L | GF | GA | GD | W | D | L | GF | GA | GD |
|---|---|---|---|---|---|---|---|---|---|---|---|---|---|---|---|---|---|---|---|
| 31 | 9 | 16 | 6 | 34 | 28 | +6 | 43 | 4 | 10 | 1 | 13 | 10 | +3 | 5 | 6 | 5 | 21 | 18 | +3 |

Last updated: 8 June 2023.
Source: worldfootball

==== Results by round ====
| Round | 1 | 2 | 3 | 4 | 5 | 6 | 7 | 8 | 9 | 10 | 11 | 12 | 13 | 14 | 15 | 16 | 17 | 18 | 19 | 20 | 21 | 22 | 23 | 24 | 25 | 26 | 27 | 28 | 29 | 30 | 31 | 32 |
|---|---|---|---|---|---|---|---|---|---|---|---|---|---|---|---|---|---|---|---|---|---|---|---|---|---|---|---|---|---|---|---|---|
| Ground | H | A | H | A | H | A | H | A | H | A | H | A | A | H | A | H | A | A | H | A | H | A | H | A | H | A | H | A | H | H | A | H |
| Result | D | D | D | D | W | L | W | D | D | L | W | W | W | W | W | D | L | W | D | L | L | D | D | L | D | D | D | W | D | D | D | |
| Position | 6 | 10 | 10 | 11 | 7 | 9 | 8 | 8 | 7 | 9 | 9 | 5 | 5 | 5 | 4 | 5 | 5 | 5 | 6 | 6 | 6 | 6 | 6 | 7 | | | | | | | | |

Updated to match(es) played on 8 June 2023. Source: worldfootball
A = Away; H = Home; W = Win; D = Draw; L = Loss

==== Matches ====
The league fixtures were announced on 9 October 2022.

| 20 October 2022 1 | Al Mokawloon Al Arab | 1–1 | Ghazl El Mahalla | Cairo |
| 15:00 EST (UTC+2) | Farid 51' | Report | Abou El Saoud 61' (pen.) | Stadium: Osman Ahmed Osman Stadium; Referee: Mohamed Al Kalawy |

| 24 October 2022 2 | Future | 0–0 | Al Mokawloon Al Arab | Cairo |
| 19:00 EST (UTC+2) | | Report | | Stadium: Al Salam Stadium; Referee: Mohammad Sabahi |

| 31 October 2022 3 | Al Mokawloon Al Arab | 0–0 | Pharco | Cairo |
| 19:00 EST (UTC+2) | | Report | | Stadium: Osman Ahmed Osman Stadium; Referee: Wael Farhan |

| 2 December 2022 5 | Al Mokawloon Al Arab | 2–1 | Ceramica Cleopatra | Cairo |
| 14:45 EST (UTC+2) | Khaled 37'; Ochaya 84' | Report | Adel 66' | Stadium: Osman Ahmed Osman Stadium; Referee: Sobhy El Amrawi |

| 7 December 2022 6 | Pyramids | 2–0 | Al Mokawloon Al Arab | Cairo |
| 14:45 EST (UTC+2) | Sobhi 33'; Ben Youssef 87' (pen.) | Report | | Stadium: 30 June Stadium; Referee: Mohamed Salama |

| 11 December 2022 4 | Smouha | 0–0 | Al Mokawloon Al Arab | Alexandria |
| 17:00 EST (UTC+2) | | Report | | Stadium: Alexandria Stadium; Referee: Tarek Magdy |

| 15 December 2022 7 | Al Mokawloon Al Arab | 3–2 | ENPPI | Cairo |
| 19:00 EST (UTC+2) | Wael 23'; Ochaya 57', 62' (pen.) | Report | Aoufa 15'; Kabou 18' | Stadium: Osman Ahmed Osman Stadium; Referee: Mohammed Yousef |

| 21 December 2022 8 | Al Masry | 2–2 | Al Mokawloon Al Arab | Suez |
| 17:00 EST (UTC+2) | Etouga 42'; Jelassi 71' (pen.) | Report | Salem 2'; Khaled 49' | Stadium: Suez Stadium; Referee: Mohamed El Atabani |

| 25 December 2022 9 | Al Mokawloon Al Arab | 0–0 | Zamalek | Cairo |
| 17:00 EST (UTC+2) | Kabore (yellow card) 89'; Niass (yellow card) 90+4' | Report | | Stadium: Osman Ahmed Osman Stadium; Referee: Abdelaziz El Sayed |

| 30 December 2022 10 | National Bank | 2–1 | Al Mokawloon Al Arab | Cairo |
| 19:00 EST (UTC+2) | Bambo 10' (pen.); Faisal (yellow card) 23'; Cissé 34'; Gaber (yellow card) 88' | Report | Khaled 3'; Farid (yellow card) 67'; Hinestroza (yellow card) 90+2'; Fayed (yellow card) 90+3' | Stadium: Cairo International Stadium; Referee: Ali El Said |

| 3 January 2023 11 | Al Mokawloon Al Arab | 3–2 | Haras El Hodoud | Cairo |
| 17:00 EST (UTC+2) | Okoli 4'; Khaled (yellow card) 31'; El Sayed (yellow card) 49'; Ochaya 56' (pen.); Saviola 68', (yellow card) 72' (yellow-red card) 85' | Report | Bassam 13'; Abdelraouf 29' (pen.); Ramadan (yellow card) 38'; Fawzi (yellow card) 55'; Abdel Hakim (yellow card) 90+5' | Stadium: Osman Ahmed Osman Stadium; Referee: Mohamed Adel |

| 8 January 2023 12 | Tala'ea El Gaish | 1–2 | Al Mokawloon Al Arab | Cairo |
| 19:00 EST (UTC+2) | Tarek 67' | Report | Alaa Eldin 4' (pen.); Okoli 66' | Stadium: Gehaz El Reyada Stadium; Referee: Ahmed Nasser |

| 13 January 2023 13 | Ismaily | 1–3 | Al Mokawloon Al Arab | Ismailia |
| 19:00 EST (UTC+2) | El Shamy 53' | Report | Saviola 50'; Niass 61'; Okoli 80' | Stadium: Ismailia Stadium; Referee: Mohamed El Hanafi |

| 19 January 2023 14 | Al Mokawloon Al Arab | 1–0 | Aswan | Cairo |
| 14:45 EST (UTC+2) | Saviola 25'; Fayed (yellow card) 67'; Okoli (yellow card) 90+6' | Report | | Stadium: Osman Ahmed Osman Stadium; Referee: Mostafa El Shahdi |

| 22 January 2023 15 | El Dakhleya | 1–2 | Al Mokawloon Al Arab | Cairo |
| 17:00 EST (UTC+2) | Haggag 10'; Ragab (yellow card) 31'; Chimezie (red card) 37'; Talaat (yellow card) 56' (red card) 75'; Kyambadde (yellow card) 82' | Report | Alaa (yellow card) 33'; Okoli 54'; Hinestroza (yellow card) 84'; Niass 90+4', (yellow card) 90+5' | Stadium: Petrosport Stadium; Referee: Walid Abdelrazek |

| 27 January 2023 16 | Al Mokawloon Al Arab | 0–0 | Al Ittihad | Cairo |
| 19:00 EST (UTC+2) | El Sayed (yellow card) 39' | Report | Mohamed (yellow card) 80' | Stadium: Osman Ahmed Osman Stadium; Referee: Mohamed Al Ghazi |

| 10 February 2023 18 | Ghazl El Mahalla | 0–3 | Al Mokawloon Al Arab | El Mahalla El Kubra |
| 18:00 EST (UTC+2) | | Report | Khaled 1'; Ochaya 63'; Saviola 90+5' | Stadium: Ghazl El Mahalla Stadium; Referee: Ahmed Gamal |

| 22 February 2023 19 | Al Mokawloon Al Arab | 0–0 | Future | Cairo |
| 17:00 EST (UTC+2) | | Report | Reda (penalty missed) 80' | Stadium: Osman Ahmed Osman Stadium; Referee: Tarek Magdy |

| 1 March 2023 20 | Pharco | 2–1 | Al Mokawloon Al Arab | Borg El Arab |
| 18:00 EST (UTC+2) | Hamroune 41'; Sabri 90+5' (pen.) | Report | Khaled 31' | Stadium: Borg El Arab Stadium; Referee: Mahmoud El Banna |

| 7 March 2023 17 | Al Ahly | 2–1 | Al Mokawloon Al Arab | Cairo |
| 17:00 EST (UTC+2) | Maâloul 3' (pen.); Kabore 22' (o.g.) | Report | Okoli 43' | Stadium: Al Ahly WE Al Salam Stadium; Referee: Mohamed El Hanafi |
Note: The game, which was initially slated for 6 February 2023, was postponed because Al Ahly will be competing in the 2022 FIFA Club World Cup.

| 11 March 2023 21 | Al Mokawloon Al Arab | 0–1 | Smouha | Cairo |
| 19:00 EST (UTC+2) | | Report | Faisal 24' | Stadium: Osman Ahmed Osman Stadium; Referee: Khaled Gamal |

| 30 March 2023 22 | Ceramica Cleopatra | 0–0 | Al Mokawloon Al Arab | Cairo |
| 21:15 EST (UTC+2) | | Report | | Stadium: Osman Ahmed Osman Stadium; Referee: Hesham El Kady |

| 5 April 2023 23 | Al Mokawloon Al Arab | 0–0 | Pyramids | Cairo |
| 21:15 EST (UTC+2) | | Report | Fathi (penalty missed) 32' | Stadium: Osman Ahmed Osman Stadium; Referee: Ahmed Hamdi |

| 9 April 2023 24 | ENPPI | 2–1 | Al Mokawloon Al Arab | Cairo |
| 21:15 EST (UTC+2) | Kalousha 12'; Kabou 40' | Report | Okoli 20' | Stadium: Petrosport Stadium; Referee: Mohammed Yousef |

| 13 April 2023 25 | Al Mokawloon Al Arab | 0–0 | Al Masry | Borg El Arab |
| 21:15 EST (UTC+2) | | Report | | Stadium: Borg El Arab Stadium; Referee: Ahmed Gamal |

| 17 April 2023 26 | Zamalek | 2–2 | Al Mokawloon Al Arab | Cairo |
| 21:15 EST (UTC+2) | Zizo 34'; Shalaby 58' (pen.) | Report | Okoli 25'; Farid 90+2' | Stadium: Cairo International Stadium; Referee: Mahmoud Bassiouni |

| 4 May 2023 27 | Al Mokawloon Al Arab | 1–1 | National Bank | Cairo |
| 19:00 EST (UTC+3) | | Report | | Stadium: Osman Ahmed Osman Stadium; Referee: Mohamed El Atabani |
Note: The game, which was initially slated for 24 April 2023, was postponed.

| 16 May 2023 28 | Haras El Hodoud | 0–2 | Al Mokawloon Al Arab | Alexandria |
| 17:00 EST (UTC+3) | | Report | Salem 6'; Okoli 43' | Stadium: Haras El Hodoud Stadium; Referee: Sayed Shabaan |

| 22 May 2023 29 | Al Mokawloon Al Arab | 0–0 | Tala'ea El Gaish | Cairo |
| 21:30 EST (UTC+3) | | Report | | Stadium: Osman Ahmed Osman Stadium; Referee: Mohamed Al Kalawy |

| 31 May 2023 30 | Al Mokawloon Al Arab | 2–2 | Ismaily | Cairo |
| 21:30 EST (UTC+3) | Saviola 17'; Okoli 79' (pen.) | Report | Chaouat 42'; El Shamy 90+19' | Stadium: Osman Ahmed Osman Stadium; Referee: Mohammed Yousef |

| 8 June 2023 31 | Aswan | 1–1 | Al Mokawloon Al Arab | Aswan |
| 21:30 EST (UTC+3) | Arafat 59' | Report | Kabore 22'; Saviola (penalty missed) 79' | Stadium: Aswan Stadium; Referee: Mahmoud Bassiouni |

| 30 June 2023 32 | Al Mokawloon Al Arab | v | El Dakhleya | Cairo |
| 21:30 EST (UTC+3) | | Report | | Stadium: Osman Ahmed Osman Stadium |

=== Egypt Cup ===
| 8 May 2023 Round of 32 | Al Mokawloon Al Arab | 4–0 | Al Hammam | Cairo |
| 21:00 EST (UTC+3) | Okoli 20' (pen.); Fathy 40'; Hassan 88'; Salem 90+1' | Report | | Stadium: Osman Ahmed Osman Stadium; Referee: Mahmoud Hussein |

| 22 June 2023 Round of 16 | Al Mokawloon Al Arab | 1–0 | Ceramica Cleopatra | Cairo |
| 21:30 | Hinestroza 74' | Report | | Stadium: Osman Ahmed Osman Stadium; Referee: Ahmed Gamal |

| 4 July 2023 Quarter-finals | Zamalek | v | Al Mokawloon Al Arab | Cairo |
| 20:30 EST (UTC+3) | | | | Stadium: Cairo International Stadium |

=== EFA Cup ===
| 19 March 2023 Round of 16 | Al Mokawloon Al Arab | 0–0 (a.e.t.) (5–6 p) | Haras El Hodoud | Cairo |
| 17:00 EST (UTC+2) | | | | Stadium: Osman Ahmed Osman Stadium |
