= 2024–25 Egyptian Premier League =

Egyptian Premier League
- Season: 2024–25
- Dates: 30 October 2024 – 31 May 2025
- Champions: Al Ahly; 45th title
- Relegated: None
- Champions League: Al Ahly; Pyramids
- Confederation Cup: Zamalek; Al Masry
- Matches: 225
- Goals: 483 (2.15 per match)
- Top goalscorer: Emam Ashour (13 goals)
- Best goalkeeper: Mahmoud Gad (12 clean sheets)
- Biggest home win: Al Ahly SC 6–0 Pharco FC (28 May 2025)
- Biggest away win: Ceramica Cleopatra FC 1–5 Pyramids FC (28 May 2025); Al Masry SC 0–4 Ceramica Cleopatra FC (17 May 2025); Ghazl El Mahalla SC 0–4 El Gouna FC (16 May 2025)
- Highest scoring: Al Ahly 5–2 Ceramica Cleopatra (2 November 2024); Pharco FC 4–3 ENPPI SC (16 May 2025)
- Longest winning run: 7 matches Pyramids
- Longest unbeaten run: 25 matches Al Ahly
- (Note: Total goals scored include six awarded goals)

The 2024–25 Egyptian Premier League season was the 66th edition of the Egyptian Premier League, the top professional league for association football clubs in the Egyptian football league system, since its establishment in 1948. Fixtures for the 2024–25 season were announced on 19 October 2024. Al Ahly are the defending champions.

The season started on 30 October 2024, and is scheduled to conclude on 31 May 2025.

The season was also marked by significant controversy following Al Ahly's withdrawal against Zamalek on 11 March 2025. The Egyptian Pro League Association initially awarded the match to Zamalek and deducted an additional three points from Al Ahly, in addition to the points lost as a result of the forfeit. However, the decision to impose the additional three-point deduction was later overturned. The decision sparked widespread controversy over the consistency of disciplinary measures, as similar cases had previously resulted in additional three-point deductions. Al Ahly finished the season with 58 points, just two points ahead of Pyramids, who finished with 56 points. Had the additional three-point deduction remained in force, Al Ahly's total would have fallen to 55 points, and Pyramids would have been crowned league champions by a one-point margin.

== Format ==
Unlike previous editions of the league, the 2024–25 season follows a format similar to the one used in the Belgian Pro League and in the 2023–24 season of the Egyptian Second Division A. This change, which reduces the total number of matches each team plays from 34 to just 25, was made to ensure that the league concludes by May or June 2025, addressing the issues the league faced regarding scheduling conflicts and postponed fixtures that, since 2020, caused each season to end on a different date.

The final format was confirmed by the EPL on 18 September 2024. The league consists of 18 teams in a single group and is played in two phases. In the first phase, teams face each other once in a single-leg tie, after which the league splits into two groups. Phase two features a championship group for the teams finishing first to ninth and a relegation group for teams placed tenth to 18th. The first-place team in the championship group is crowned league champion and qualifies for the CAF Champions League alongside the runner-up, while the third-place team qualifies for the CAF Confederation Cup. Unlike the usual setup, where three teams are relegated, only the bottom two teams in the relegation group will drop to the Second Division A.

On 18 May 2025, the Egyptian Pro League Association announced the cancellation of relegation for the 2024–25 season, while confirming that three teams will be promoted from the second division for the following season.

== Teams ==
Locations of the 2024–25 Egyptian Premier League teams

A total of three teams were promoted to the league from the 2023–24 Egyptian Second Division A. The first team was champions Petrojet, who secured promotion back to the Egyptian Premier League after a four-year absence. They were joined by Ghazl El Mahalla, who reached an immediate return to the league after clinching the second promotion spot on the final day of the season. Haras El Hodoud were the last team to earn promotion, who also reached an immediate return to the league, after winning the promotion play-offs.

El Dakhleya were the first team to be relegated, whose relegation was confirmed on 21 July 2024 after two seasons in the league. On 13 August 2024, Al Mokawloon Al Arab became the second team to face relegation; ending their 19-year stay in the top flight. They were joined by Baladiyat El Mahalla, whose relegation was confirmed also on the same day, to suffer an immediate return to level two.

=== Stadiums and locations ===
Team	Location	Stadium (Note: Main stadiums for the 2024–25 season are listed only. Clubs are allowed to play selected matches at alternative venues; whether due to unavailability, security concerns, or other reasons. For example, Al Ittihad, a team from Alexandria, may play some home games at Borg El Arab Stadium, instead of their regular home stadium, Alexandria Stadium.)	Capacity
Al Ahly	Gezira	Cairo International Stadium	75,000
Ceramica Cleopatra	6th of October	Osman Ahmed Osman Stadium	35,000
ENPPI	New Cairo	Petrosport Stadium	16,000
Ghazl El Mahalla	El Mahalla El Kubra	Ghazl El Mahalla Stadium	14,564
El Gouna	El Gouna	Khaled Bichara Stadium	12,000
Haras El Hodoud	Mahatet El Raml	Haras El Hodoud Stadium	22,000
Ismaily	Ismailia (Sheikh Zayed)	Ismailia Stadium	18,525
Al Ittihad	Shatby	Alexandria Stadium	19,676
Al Masry	Port Said (Al Dawahy)	Suez Stadium	27,000
Modern Sport	Mokattam	Cairo International Stadium	75,000
National Bank of Egypt	Agouza	Cairo International Stadium	75,000
Petrojet	Suez (Faisal)	Cairo Military Academy Stadium	28,500
Pharco	Amreya	Haras El Hodoud Stadium	22,000
Pyramids	New Cairo	30 June Stadium	30,000
Smouha	Smouha	Alexandria Stadium	19,676
Tala'ea El Gaish	Al Waili	Gehaz El Reyada Stadium	20,000
Zamalek	Mit Okba	Cairo International Stadium	75,000
ZED	Sheikh Zayed City	Cairo International Stadium	75,000

=== Personnel and kits ===
Team	Manager	Captain	Kit manufacturer	Shirt sponsor(s) (front)	Shirt sponsor(s) (sleeve)	Shirt sponsor(s) (back)
Al Ahly	(Switzerland) Marcel Koller	(Egypt) Mohamed El Shenawy	Adidas	Etisalat, FAB Misr	Al Marasem, GLC Paints	Lipton, Shell Helix
Ceramica Cleopatra	(Egypt) Ayman El Ramadi	(Egypt) Mohamed Tony	Puma	Ceramica Cleopatra Group		
ENPPI	(Egypt) Sayed Yassin	(Egypt) Abdel Aziz El Balouti	Kelme			
Ghazl El Mahalla	(Egypt) Ahmed Eid	(Egypt) Mohamed Gaber	Tempo	Misr Travel	KIMA	
El Gouna	(Egypt) Alaa Abdel Aal	(Madagascar) Arnaud Randrianantenaina	Adidas	Owest Orascom Development		
Haras El Hodoud	(Egypt) Mohamed Youssef	(Egypt) Mostafa Gamal	Adidas			
Ismaily	(Egypt) Hamad Ibrahim	(Egypt) Emad Hamdy	ZAT Outfit			
Al Ittihad	(Cyprus) Nikodimos Papavasiliou	(Egypt) Karim El Deeb	Kelme			
Al Masry	(Egypt) Ali Maher	(Egypt) Amr Moussa	Puma	Neverland Resort		
Modern Sport	(Egypt) Talaat Youssef	(Egypt) Mahmoud Genish	Umbro	MTI University	SBIS	Modern Academy
National Bank of Egypt	(Egypt) Tarek Mostafa	(Egypt) Mohamed Bassiouny	Nike	National Bank of Egypt		National Bank of Egypt
Petrojet	(Egypt) Sayed Eid	(Egypt) Mohamed Abou El Naga	Adidas			
Pharco	(Egypt) Ahmed Khattab	(Egypt) Ramy Sabry	Adidas	RANI-F		V-Gone
Pyramids	(Croatia) Krunoslav Jurčić	(Egypt) Ahmed El Shenawy	Puma	MyWhoosh	Bolt, CMB	ADQ, Pasta Regina
Smouha	(Egypt) Ahmed Samy	(Egypt) Hossam Hassan	Nike			
Tala'ea El Gaish	(Egypt) Abdel Hamid Bassiouny	(Egypt) Khaled Stouhi	Adidas			
Zamalek	(Portugal) José Peseiro	(Egypt) Shikabala	ZAT Outfit	Nile Developments, Pasta Regina	Seven	Oniro, Coca-Cola
ZED	(Egypt) Magdy Abdel Aati	(Egypt) Mohamed Samir	Adidas	ORA, Emirates NBD	WE, Seven	Orascom Construction

=== Managerial changes ===
Team	Outgoing manager	Manner of departure	Date of vacancy	Position in table	Incoming manager	Date of appointment
Haras El Hodoud	(Egypt) Mohamed Mekky	Resigned	7 July 2024	Pre-season	(Egypt) Mohamed Youssef	2 August 2024
Al Ittihad	(Egypt) Ahmed Sary	End of contract	18 August 2024	Pre-season	(Cyprus) Nikodimos Papavasiliou	19 August 2024
Ismaily	(Egypt) Ehab Galal	Deceased	11 September 2024	Pre-season	(Egypt) Hamad Ibrahim	4 October 2024

== Regular season ==
Pos	Team	Pld	W	D	L	GF	GA	GD	Pts	Qualification or relegation
1	Pyramids	17	13	3	1	32	10	+22	42	Qualification for the championship play-offs
2	Al Ahly	17	11	6	0	30	9	+21	39	Qualification for the championship play-offs
3	Zamalek	17	9	5	3	30	16	+14	32	Qualification for the championship play-offs
4	Al Masry	17	8	6	3	19	11	+8	30	Qualification for the championship play-offs
5	National Bank of Egypt	17	8	5	4	22	18	+4	29	Qualification for the championship play-offs
6	Ceramica Cleopatra	17	6	6	5	23	21	+2	24	Qualification for the championship play-offs
7	Pharco	17	6	5	6	17	19	−2	23	Qualification for the championship play-offs
8	Petrojet	17	5	7	5	17	18	−1	22	Qualification for the championship play-offs
9	Haras El Hodoud	17	6	4	7	17	19	−2	22	Qualification for the championship play-offs
10	Tala'ea El Gaish	17	5	6	6	13	18	−5	21	Qualification for the relegation play-offs
11	ZED	17	4	9	4	15	13	+2	21	Qualification for the relegation play-offs
12	Smouha	17	6	2	9	13	22	−9	20	Qualification for the relegation play-offs
13	Al Ittihad	17	4	6	7	11	16	−5	18	Qualification for the relegation play-offs
14	Ghazl El Mahalla	17	5	2	10	16	24	−8	17	Qualification for the relegation play-offs
15	El Gouna	17	4	5	8	10	15	−5	17	Qualification for the relegation play-offs
16	Ismaily	17	3	5	9	11	21	−10	14	Qualification for the relegation play-offs
17	ENPPI	17	2	6	9	10	21	−11	12	Qualification for the relegation play-offs
18	Modern Sport	17	1	6	10	9	24	−15	9	Qualification for the relegation play-offs

Source: Soccerway (regular season)
Rules for classification: 1) Points; 2) Goal difference; 3) Goals scored.

== Championship play-offs ==
Pos	Team	Pld	W	D	L	GF	GA	GD	Pts	Qualification
1	Al Ahly (C)	8	6	1	1	22	9	+13	58 (Note: Al Ahly were initially deducted three points for refusing to play their away fixture against Zamalek, scheduled to be played on 11 March 2025. The points deduction was later cancelled by the Egyptian Premier League.)	Qualification for the Champions League first or second round
2	Pyramids	8	4	2	2	15	10	+5	56	Qualification for the Champions League first or second round
3	Zamalek	8	4	3	1	14	6	+8	47	Qualification for the Confederation Cup first or second round
4	Al Masry	8	3	3	2	10	9	+1	42	Qualification for the Confederation Cup first or second round
5	National Bank of Egypt SC	8	2	3	3	13	12	+1	38	
6	Ceramica Cleopatra	8	4	1	3	15	12	+3	37	
7	Pharco	8	2	3	3	8	16	−8	32	
8	Petrojet	8	1	2	5	7	17	−10	27	
9	Haras El Hodoud	8	0	2	6	3	16	−13	24	

Source: Soccerway (championship round)
Rules for classification: 1) Points; 2) Goal difference; 3) Goals scored; 4) Play-off tie.
(Note: Clubs qualified for this phase with the full regular season points they got, but without goals for or against)
(C) Champions

== Relegation play-offs ==
Pos	Team	Pld	W	D	L	GF	GA	GD	Pts
1	ZED	8	2	5	1	9	5	+4	32
2	El Gouna	8	4	1	3	10	7	+3	30
3	Tala'ea El Gaish	8	1	5	2	5	6	−1	29
4	ENPPI	8	4	3	1	8	5	+3	27
5	Modern Sport	8	5	2	1	12	7	+5	26
6	Al Ittihad	8	1	5	2	3	5	−2	26
7	Smouha	8	0	5	3	2	6	−4	25
8	Ismaily	8	2	3	3	7	7	0	23
9	Ghazl El Mahalla	8	1	3	4	4	12	−8	23

Source: Soccerway (relegation round)
Rules for classification: 1) Points; 2) Goal difference; 3) Goals scored; 4) Play-off tie.
(Note: Clubs qualified for this phase with the full regular season points they got, but without goals for or against)

== Results ==
=== Regular season ===
Home \ Away	AHL	CER	ENP	GMH	GOU	HRS	ISM	ITH	MAS	MOD	NBE	PET	PHA	PYR	SMO	TGS	ZAM	ZED
Al Ahly		5–2		1–0	2–0			1–1				2–1		2–2	2–0	2–0	1–1	
Ceramica Cleopatra			2–2				1–0	1–1	1–1	4–1		4–1	1–2		0–1			
ENPPI	0–0						1–0	1–1			0–1			1–2	1–0	0–1	0–3	
Ghazl El Mahalla		0–1	3–0			0–1		0–0	1–0	2–1	0–1					2–3	0–4	
El Gouna		2–0	1–0	0–1		0–1	2–0				1–2			0–1				0–0
Haras El Hodoud	0–1	0–0	1–0						0–0	1–0			2–0		1–3	3–0		
Ismaily	0–4			0–0		2–2						1–0	0–2	1–1	1–0	1–2		
Al Ittihad					1–0	1–0	1–0		1–2	0–0				1–3	0–1	0–1		0–1
Al Masry	0–2		2–1		0–0		0–0			4–2	0–0		1–0	1–0				
Modern Sport	1–3		0–0		2–3		0–3				0–1			0–1		0–0	1–0	0–0
National Bank of Egypt	0–0	1–2				2–1	1–0	3–2				0–2	0–0					1–1
Petrojet			0–0	2–1	1–0	2–2		0–0	2–1	1–1			1–2		0–1			
Pharco	1–1		4–3	3–2	0–0			0–1		0–0					2–1		0–1	1–2
Pyramids		2–1		3–0		3–0					3–1	1–1	3–0			2–1	3–0	
Smouha				2–4	0–0				0–3	1–0	1–4			0–1			0–2	2–1
Tala'ea El Gaish		0–1			0–0				0–2		2–2	0–1	0–0		0–0		2–2	1–0
Zamalek		1–1			4–1	3–2	2–0	2–0	0–1		3–2	1–1						1–1
ZED	0–1	1–1	0–0	2–0		2–0	2–2		1–1			1–1		0–1				

Source: Soccerway
Legend: Blue = home team win; Yellow = draw; Red = away team win.
For upcoming matches, an "a" indicates there is an article about the rivalry between the two participants.

=== Championship round ===
Home \ Away	AHL	CER	HRS	MAS	NBE	PET	PHA	PYR	ZAM
Al Ahly			5–0	4–2	2–1		6–0		
Ceramica Cleopatra	0–1		2–0		2–4			1–5	2–2
Haras El Hodoud					1–1	1–2		1–2	0–2
Al Masry		0–4	2–0			4–0			0–0
National Bank of Egypt				0–1				4–2	2–2
Petrojet	2–3	0–2			0–0			0–2	1–3
Pharco		0–2	0–0	1–1	2–1	2–2		3–2	
Pyramids	1–1			0–0					
Zamalek	3–0 (Note: Awarded.)						2–0	0–1	

Updated to match(es) played on 31 May 2025. Source: Soccerway
Legend: Blue = home team win; Yellow = draw; Red = away team win.
For upcoming matches, an "a" indicates there is an article about the rivalry between the two participants.

=== Relegation round ===
Home \ Away	ENP	GMH	GOU	ISM	ITH	MOD	SMO	TGS	ZED
ENPPI		1–0	0–1			2–1			1–1
Ghazl El Mahalla			0–4	1–1			1–0		0–3
El Gouna					2–0	0–1	1–1	0–1	
Ismaily	0–1		3–0		0–0	1–2			0–2
Al Ittihad	1–1	0–0							
Modern Sport		2–1			1–0		2–0		
Smouha	0–1			1–1	0–0			0–0	
Tala'ea El Gaish	1–1	1–1		0–1	1–2	1–1			
ZED			1–2		0–0	2–2	0–0	0–0	

Updated to match(es) played on 29 May 2025. Source: Soccerway
Legend: Blue = home team win; Yellow = draw; Red = away team win.

== Number of teams by governorate ==
Number of teams	Governorate	Team(s)
6	Cairo	Al Ahly, ENPPI, Modern Sport, Pyramids, Tala'ea El Gaish and Zamalek
4	Alexandria	Haras El Hodoud, Al Ittihad, Pharco and Smouha
3	Giza	Ceramica Cleopatra, National Bank of Egypt and ZED
1	Gharbia	Ghazl El Mahalla
1	Ismailia	Ismaily
1	Port Said	Al Masry
1	Red Sea	El Gouna
1	Suez	Petrojet

== Statistics ==
=== Top scorers ===
Rank	Player	Club	Goals
1	(Egypt) Emam Ashour	Al Ahly	13
3	(Egypt) Nasser Mansi	Zamalek	12
3	(Egypt) Osama Faisal	National Bank	12
5	(Palestine) Wessam Abou Ali	Al Ahly	10
5	(Togo) Yaw Annor	National Bank	10
6	(Tunisia) Mohamed Ali Ben Hammouda	Ghazl Al Mahalla	9

=== Team of the season ===
Pos.	Player	Team
GK	(Egypt) Mohamed El Shenawy	Al Ahly
DF	(Morocco) Mohamed Chibi	Pyramids
DF	(Egypt) Hossam Abdelmaguid	Zamalek
DF	(Egypt) Ramy Rabia	Al Ahly
DF	(Morocco) Mahmoud Bentayg	Zamalek
MF	(Egypt) Mohanad Lasheen	Pyramids
MF	(Egypt) Marwan Attia	Al Ahly
MF	(Egypt) Emam Ashour	Al Ahly
FW	(Egypt) Mostafa Fathi	Pyramids
FW	(Democratic Republic of the Congo) Fiston Mayele	Pyramids
FW	(Egypt) Ibrahim Adel	Pyramids

=== Best player ===
Pos.	Player	Team
MF	(Egypt) Emam Ashour	Al Ahly

== See also ==
- 2024–25 Egyptian Second Division A
- 2024–25 Egyptian Second Division B
- 2024–25 Egypt Cup
