= 2024–25 Pharco FC season =

Pharco
2024–25 season
- Manager: Ahmed Khattab
- Stadium: Haras El Hodoud Stadium
- Egyptian Premier League: 9th
- Egypt Cup: Round of 16
- Egyptian League Cup: Group stage
- Top goalscorer: League: Amr Nasser (2); All: Ahmed Sherif (3)
- Biggest win: Pharco 3–1 Tersana
- All statistics correct as of 16 January 2025.

The 2024–25 season is the 15th season in Pharco FC's history and the fourth consecutive season in the Premier League. In addition to the domestic league, Pharco is set to compete in the domestic cup, and the Egyptian League Cup.

== Transfers ==
=== In ===
Date	Pos.	Player	From	Fee	Ref.
12 September 2024	FW	(Morocco) Zouhair El Moutaraji	(Bahrain) Al-Khaldiya	Free	
4 October 2024	MF	(Angola) Enoque Tula	(Egypt) Baladiyat El Mahalla	Loan	

=== Out ===
Date	Pos.	Player	To	Fee	Ref.
6 September 2024	MF	(Egypt) Mohamed Sayed	(Egypt) Raya	Loan	
15 September 2024	GK	(Egypt) Mahmoud El Sayed	Retired		
5 October 2024	FW	(Egypt) Amr Gamal	(Egypt) Haras El Hodoud	End of contract	

== Competitions ==
=== Overall record ===
Competition	First match	Last match	Starting round	Record							
Competition	First match	Last match	Starting round	Pld	W	D	L	GF	GA	GD	Win %
Egyptian Premier League	1 November 2024	30 May 2025	Matchday 1	8	3	1	4	9	12	−3	37.50
Egypt Cup	3 January 2025		Round of 32	1	1	0	0	3	1	+2	100.00
Egyptian League Cup	12 December 2024		Group stage	1	0	1	0	1	1	+0	0.00
Total				10	4	2	4	13	14	−1	40.00

Last updated: 16 January 2025
Source: Competitions

=== Egyptian Premier League ===
==== League table ====
Pos	Team	Pld	W	D	L	GF	GA	GD	Pts
4	Al Masry	18	8	7	3	0	0	0	31
5	National Bank of Egypt	18	8	5	5	1	2	−1	29
6	Pharco	18	7	5	6	2	1	+1	26
7	Petrojet	18	6	7	5	2	1	+1	25
8	Ceramica Cleopatra	17	6	6	5	0	0	0	24

Updated to match(es) played on 13 March 2025. Source: Soccerway (championship round)
Rules for classification: 1) Points; 2) Goal difference; 3) Goals scored; 4) Play-off tie.
(Note: Clubs qualified for this phase with the full regular season points they got, but without goals for or against)

==== Results summary ====
Overall								Home						Away					
Pld	W	D	L	GF	GA	GD	Pts	W	D	L	GF	GA	GD	W	D	L	GF	GA	GD
8	3	1	4	9	12	−3	10	2	0	2	7	7	0	1	1	2	2	5	−3

Last updated: 16 January 2025.

==== Results by round ====
Round	1	2	3	4	5	6	7	8	9
Ground	H	A	H	A	H	A	H	A	H
Result	L	D	W	W	L	L	W	L	
Position	15	15	6	6	8	11	7		

Updated to match(es) played on 16 January 2025. Source:
A = Away; H = Home; W = Win; D = Draw; L = Loss

==== Matches ====
The league schedule was released on 19 October 2024.

1 November 2024 1	Pharco	0–1	Al Ittihad	Alexandria
17:00 UTC+2			Apeh 66'	Stadium: Borg El Arab Stadium; Referee: Abdel Aziz El-Sayed

9 November 2024 2	National Bank	0–0	Pharco	Cairo
17:00 UTC+2				Stadium: Al Salam Stadium; Referee: Ahmed Al-Ghandour

22 November 2024 3	Pharco	4–3	ENPPI	Alexandria
17:00 UTC+2	Nasser 35' (pen.), 44'; Gehad 85'; Sherif 89'		Kalousha 15'; Fawzi 81' (pen.), 90+11' (pen.)	Stadium: Haras El Hodoud Stadium; Referee: Mohamed El Atabani

2 December 2024 4	Petrojet	1–2	Pharco	Cairo
17:00 UTC+2	Metwally 73' (pen.); Abo Ziada (yellow card) 84' (yellow-red card) 90+5'		Gehad 23'; Farag 41'	Stadium: Petrosport Stadium; Referee: Walid Abdelrazek

20 December 2024 5	Pharco	1–2	ZED	Alexandria
20:00 UTC+2	Sherif 35'		El Banouby 8'; Hussein 72'	Stadium: Haras El Hodoud Stadium; Referee: Mohamed Yousef

25 December 2024 6	Pyramids	3–0	Pharco	Cairo
20:00 UTC+2	Chibi 22'; Awujoola 53'; Mayele 68'			Stadium: 30 June Stadium; Referee: Ahmed Hamdi

30 December 2024 7	Pharco	2–1	Smouha	Alexandria
20:00 UTC+2	Nasser 54' (pen.); El Moutaraji 80'		Dokou 19'	Stadium: Haras El Hodoud Stadium; Referee: Mahmoud Wafa

16 January 2025 8	Al Masry	1–0	Pharco	Suez
19:00 UTC+2	Makhlouf 20'; Gad (red card) 75'			Stadium: Suez Stadium

22 January 2025 9	Pharco	v	Al Ahly	Alexandria
16:00 UTC+2				Stadium: Borg El Arab Stadium

=== Egypt Cup ===
3 January 2025 Round of 32	Pharco	3–1	Tersana	Alexandria
14:30 UTC+2	Sherif 45+1'; Reda 48'; Ndiaye 64'		Khaled 72'	Stadium: Haras El Hodoud Stadium; Referee: Mahmoud Rushdi

8 March 2025 Round of 16	Ghazl El Mahalla	v	Pharco	El Mahalla El Kubra
21:30 UTC+2				Stadium: Ghazl El Mahalla Stadium

=== Egyptian League Cup ===
==== Group stage ====
Pos	Team	Pld	W	D	L	GF	GA	GD	Pts	Qualification
1	ENPPI	2	2	0	0	2	0	+2	6	Advance to knockout stage
2	Tala'ea El Gaish	2	1	1	0	4	2	+2	4	Advance to knockout stage
3	Pharco	2	0	1	1	1	2	−1	1	
4	Al Ahly	2	0	0	2	1	4	−3	0	

Updated to match(es) played on 24 March 2025. Source: EPL
Rules for classification: Group stage tiebreakers

12 December 2024 1	Pharco	1–1	Tala'ea El Gaish	Alexandria
17:00 UTC+2	Sherif 71'		Mohareb 29'	Stadium: Haras El Hodoud Stadium; Referee: Mohamed Abbas Kabil

22 March 2025 2	ENPPI	v	Pharco	Cairo
				Stadium: Petrosport Stadium

22 April 2025 3	Al Ahly	v	Pharco	Cairo
				Stadium: Cairo International Stadium
