= 2017–18 Egypt Cup =

2018 Egypt Cup
Tournament details
- Country: Egypt
- Dates: 23 September – 28 October 2017 (qualifying competition); 7 November 2017 – 15 May 2018 (main competition)
- Teams: 286 (overall); 254 (qualifying competition); 32 (main competition)

Final positions
- Champions: Zamalek (26th Egypt Cup title)
- Runners-up: Smouha
- Confederation Cup: Zamalek

Tournament statistics
- Top goal scorer(s): Kabongo Kasongo (4 goals)

The 2017–18 Egypt Cup was the 86th edition of the oldest recognised football tournament in Africa. It was sponsored by Telecom Egypt, and known as the Telecom Egypt Cup for sponsorship purposes. 286 clubs were accepted into the tournament. It began with the first qualifying round on 23 September 2017, and concluded with the final on 15 May 2018. The winner qualifies for the 2018–19 CAF Confederation Cup.

Egyptian Premier League side Al Ahly were the defending champions, but they were eliminated by Al Assiouty Sport in the quarter-finals on 30 April 2018.

Zamalek won their 26th title after defeating Smouha 5–4 on penalties in the final, after the match ended 1–1 after extra time, winning their 5th Egypt Cup in 6 seasons.

== Teams ==
Round	Clubs remaining	Clubs involved	Winners from previous round	New entries this round	Leagues entering at this round
Round of 32	32	32	14	18	Egyptian Premier League
Round of 16	16	16	16	none	none
Quarter-finals	8	8	8	none	none
Semi-finals	4	4	4	none	none
Final	2	2	2	none	none

== Round and draw dates ==
The schedule is as follows.

Phase	Round	Draw date	Match date
Qualifying rounds	First Qualifying Round	18 September 2017	23–28 September 2017
Qualifying rounds	Second Qualifying Round	30 September 2017	3–5 October 2017
Qualifying rounds	Third Qualifying Round	11 October 2017	16–17 October 2017
Qualifying rounds	Fourth Qualifying Round	19 October 2017	22–24 October 2017
Qualifying rounds	Fifth Qualifying Round	25 October 2017	27–28 October 2017
Main tournament	Round of 32	1 November 2017	7–11 November 2017
Main tournament	Round of 16	1 November 2017	7 December 2017 – 13 April 2018
Main tournament	Quarter-finals	1 November 2017	14 April – 2 May 2018
Main tournament	Semi-finals	1 November 2017	7–8 May 2018
Main tournament	Final	1 November 2017	15 May 2018

== Qualifying rounds ==
All of the competing teams that are not members of the Egyptian Premier League had to compete in the qualifying rounds to secure one of 14 available places in the Round of 32. The qualifying competition began with the first qualifying round on 23 September 2017. The final (fifth) qualifying round was played on 27 and 28 October 2017.

== Round of 32 ==
A total of 32 clubs played in this round; 14 winners of the fifth qualifying round, and 18 teams from the Premier League entering in this round. The draw was held on 1 November 2017 at the EFA headquarters in Gezira, Cairo. The matches were played from 7 to 11 November 2017. The round included one team from Level 3 still in the competition, Asyut Petroleum, who were the lowest-ranked team in this round.

All times are CAT (UTC+2).

7 November 2017	Petrojet (1)	1–0	National Bank (2)	Ismailia
14:30	Shebeita 43'	Report		Stadium: Ismailia Stadium; Referee: Mahmoud Roushdy

7 November 2017	Tala'ea El Gaish (1)	1–2	El Gouna (2)	Cairo
17:15	Youssef 10'	Report	Ragab 24' (pen.), 60' (pen.)	Stadium: Petro Sport Stadium; Referee: Amr Ramadan

7 November 2017	Al Nasr (1)	0–1	El Dakhleya (1)	Cairo
20:00		Report	Sabry 48'	Stadium: Al Salam Stadium; Referee: Mohamed El Hanafy

8 November 2017	Wadi Degla (1)	1–0	Kafr El Sheikh (2)	Cairo
14:30	Sherif 20'	report		Stadium: Al Salam Stadium; Referee: Hesham El Ghalal

8 November 2017	El Entag El Harby (1)	1–0	Asyut Petroleum (3)	Cairo
14:30	Nagah 16'	Report		Stadium: Petro Sport Stadium; Referee: Hany Amin

8 November 2017	Al Masry (1)	3–0	Beni Ebeid (2)	Alexandria
17:15	Gomaa 22', 49', 64'	Report		Stadium: Borg El Arab Stadium; Referee: Ahmed El Dalil

8 November 2017	Al Mokawloon (1)	3–0	El Shams (2)	Cairo
20:00	Abdel Razek 40'; Ali 62'; Gedo 90+5'	Report		Stadium: Cairo International Stadium; Referee: Mohamed El Helawy

9 November 2017	Tanta (1)	0–2	Haras El Hodoud (2)	Alexandria
14:30		Report	Adel 24'; Masoud 74'	Stadium: Alexandria Stadium; Referee: Mabrouk Nabil

9 November 2017	Misr Lel Makkasa (1)	3–1 (a.e.t.)	Al Merreikh (2)	Ismailia
17:15	El Shahat 20', 120+2'; Fathy 120'	Report	El Batot 71'	Stadium: Ismailia Stadium; Referee: Sobhy El Amrawy

9 November 2017	Zamalek (1)	1–0	El Minya (2)	Cairo
20:30	Kasongo 58'	Report		Stadium: Cairo International Stadium; Referee: Ibrahim Nour El Din

10 November 2017	Ismaily (1)	3–1	El Sharkia (2)	Ismailia
14:30	Calderón 2', 90+2'; Metwally 22' (pen.)	Report	Calderón 86' (o.g.)	Stadium: Ismailia Stadium; Referee: Hassan El Sandabessy

10 November 2017	Smouha (1)	2–1	Olympic Club (2)	Alexandria
17:15	Ibrahim 20'; Emam 90+1'	Report	Marey 80'	Stadium: Haras El Hodoud Stadium; Referee: Abdel Aziz El Sayed

10 November 2017	Al Ahly (1)	5–0	Telephonat Beni Suef (2)	Cairo
20:00	Hesham 20'; El Solia 23'; Azaro 44'; Moteab 57' (pen.); Hamdy 82'	Report		Stadium: Petro Sport Stadium; Referee: Tarek Samy

11 November 2017	Al Assiouty Sport (1)	1–0	El Raja (1)	Cairo
14:30	Bassam 60'	Report		Stadium: Petro Sport Stadium; Referee: Hossam El Galad

11 November 2017	Al Ittihad (1)	2–1	Ala'ab Damanhour (2)	Alexandria
17:15	Manucho 50'; Abdel Maguid 90+9'	Report	Abdel Hakim 58'	Stadium: Alexandria Stadium; Referee: Walid Abdel Aziz

11 November 2017	ENPPI (1)	0–1	FC Masr (2)	Cairo
20:00		Report	Hamdy 41'	Stadium: Cairo International Stadium; Referee: Ahmed El Edawy

== Round of 16 ==
A total of 16 clubs played in this round; all winners of the previous round. The draw was held on 1 November 2017 at the EFA headquarters in Gezira, Cairo. The matches were played from 7 December 2017 to 13 April 2018. (Note: Two matches, Misr Lel Makkasa v Al Mokawloon and Al Ahly v El Dakhleya, were postponed due to conflicting with a postponed league match involving Al Ahly and Misr Lel Makkasa, which was set to be played on 10 December 2017; the same day the cup matches were scheduled to be played on. The Egyptian Football Association announced that the postponed cup matches will be played on 9 January 2018 and 22 March 2018 respectively. However, Al Ahly v El Dakhleya match was postponed again due to conflicting with the Egyptian national team friendly match against Portugal in preparation for the 2018 FIFA World Cup; and the match was rescheduled again to be played on 13 April 2018.) The round included three teams from Level 2 still in the competition, FC Masr, El Gouna and Haras El Hodoud, who were the lowest-ranked team in this round.

All times are CAT (UTC+2).

7 December 2017	Haras El Hodoud (2)	0–3	Zamalek (1)	Cairo
19:00		Report	Kasongo 17'; Ajan 41' (pen.); Ibrahim 74'	Stadium: Al Salam Stadium; Referee: Mahmoud Ashour

8 December 2017	FC Masr (2)	0–1	Ismaily (1)	Suez
16:00		Report	Magdy 88'	Stadium: Suez Stadium; Referee: Ahmed Hamdy

8 December 2017	Smouha (1)	2–1	Petrojet (1)	Cairo
19:00	Taha 29'; Hassan 43'	Report	Shebeita 33'	Stadium: Al Salam Stadium; Referee: Mohamed Abou Khater

9 December 2017	El Gouna (2)	0–1	El Entag El Harby (1)	Cairo
16:00		Report	Essam 44'	Stadium: Cairo International Stadium; Referee: Amr El Shenawy

9 December 2017	Wadi Degla (1)	1–0	Al Masry (1)	Alexandria
19:00	Sherif 28'	Report		Stadium: Borg El Arab Stadium; Referee: Mohamed El Hanafy

11 December 2017	Al Assiouty Sport (1)	3–1	Al Ittihad (1)	Cairo
19:00	Dabo 23' (pen.), 55'; Antar 90+5'	Report	Atwa 21'	Stadium: Petro Sport Stadium; Referee: Hesham El Fallal

9 January 2018	Misr Lel Makkasa (1)	0–0 (a.e.t.) (5–6 p)	Al Mokawloon (1)	Cairo
15:00		Report		Stadium: Petro Sport Stadium; Referee: Sabry Ibrahim
	Penalties
	Antwi (penalty scored); Samy (penalty scored); Mohsen (penalty scored); Rico (penalty missed); Gaber (penalty scored); Voavy (penalty scored); Hazem (penalty missed)		(penalty scored) Adel; (penalty scored) Gedo; (penalty missed) Shawky; (penalty scored) Farouk; (penalty scored) Ali; (penalty scored) El Shamy; (penalty scored) Abdel Razek

13 April 2018	Al Ahly (1)	2–0	El Dakhleya (1)	Cairo
19:00	El Solia 71'; Mohareb 82'	Report		Stadium: Al Salam Stadium; Referee: Mahmoud Ashour

== Quarter-finals ==
A total of 8 clubs played in this round; all winners of the previous round. The draw was held on 1 November 2017 at the EFA headquarters in Gezira, Cairo. The matches were played from 14 April 2018 to 2 May 2018. (Note: All quarter-final matches were scheduled to be played from 13 to 16 April 2018, but due to the scheduling conflicts that occurred after rescheduling Al Ahly v El Dakhleya match in the round of 16 to 13 April 2018 instead of 22 March 2018, and due to the rescheduling of matchday 31 and 32 in the Egyptian Premier League, all quarter-final matches, except Al Mokawloon v Ismaily, were postponed and rescheduled to be played between 30 April and 2 May 2018.)

All times are CAT (UTC+2).

14 April 2018	Al Mokawloon (1)	0–2	Ismaily (1)	Suez
18:00		Report	Hosny 6', 15'	Stadium: Egyptian Army Stadium; Attendance: 4,000; Referee: Mohamed Abou Khater

30 April 2018	Al Ahly (1)	0–1	Al Assiouty Sport (1)	Cairo
19:00		Report	Kamal 64'	Stadium: Al Salam Stadium; Referee: Mohamed Adel

1 May 2018	Smouha (1)	0–0 (a.e.t.) (3–1 p)	Wadi Degla (1)	Cairo
18:00		Report		Stadium: Al Salam Stadium; Referee: Gehad Grisha
	Penalties
	Farid (penalty missed); Bakry (penalty missed); Saleh (penalty scored); Hassan (penalty scored); Manga (penalty scored)		(penalty missed) Said; (penalty missed) Ndiaye; (penalty scored) Salem; (penalty missed) Anwar

2 May 2018	El Entag El Harby (1)	1–3	Zamalek (1)	Cairo
18:30	Shedid 4'	Report	Alaa 55' (pen.); Antar 89'; Hamed 90+3'	Stadium: Petro Sport Stadium; Referee: Mahmoud Ashour

== Semi-finals ==
A total of 4 clubs played in this round; all winners of the previous round. The draw was held on 1 November 2017 at the EFA headquarters in Gezira, Cairo. The matches were played on 7 and 8 May 2018.

All times are CAT (UTC+2).

7 May 2018	Ismaily (1)	1–4	Zamalek (1)	Alexandria
19:00	Sadek 75'	Report	Obama 11', 61'; Abdel Aziz 20'; Kasongo 62'	Stadium: Borg El Arab Stadium; Attendance: 5,000; Referee: Mohamed Adel

8 May 2018	Al Assiouty Sport (1)	1–1 (a.e.t.) (3–4 p)	Smouha (1)	Alexandria
19:00	Shilongo 90+2' (pen.)	Report	Temsah 72'	Stadium: Borg El Arab Stadium; Referee: Mohamed El Hanafy
	Penalties
	Kamal (penalty scored); Reda (penalty scored); Shilongo (penalty missed); Saviola (penalty scored); Said (penalty missed)		(penalty scored) Hamdy; (penalty scored) Ibrahim; (penalty scored) Bakry; (penalty scored) Saleh; (penalty missed) Hassan

== Final ==
15 May 2018
19:00 CAT

Smouha	1–1 (a.e.t.)	Zamalek
Hassan 5'	Report	Kasongo 86'
Penalties
Bakry (penalty missed); Moaz (penalty scored); Y. Ibrahim (penalty scored); Saleh (penalty scored); Farid (penalty scored)	4–5	(penalty scored) Alaa; (penalty scored) Hamed; (penalty scored) Gomaa; (penalty scored) Nagguez; (penalty scored) Obama

Borg El Arab Stadium, Alexandria
Referee: Mohamed Farouk

== Bracket ==
The following is the bracket which the Egypt Cup resembled. Numbers in parentheses next to the match score represent the results of a penalty shoot-out.

Round of 32; 7–11 November 2017
Al Ahly	5
Telephonat Beni Suef	0
Al Nasr	0
El Dakhleya	1
Al Assiouty Sport	1
El Raja	0
Al Ittihad	2
Ala'ab Damanhour	1
Smouha	2
Olympic Club	1
Petrojet	1
National Bank	0
Wadi Degla	1
Kafr El Sheikh	0
Al Masry	3
Beni Ebeid	0
Misr Lel Makkasa (a.e.t.)	3
Al Merreikh	1
Al Mokawloon	3
El Shams	0
ENPPI	0
FC Masr	1
Ismaily	3
El Sharkia	1
Tala'ea El Gaish	1
El Gouna	2
El Entag El Harby	1
Assiut Petroleum	0
Tanta	0
Haras El Hodoud	2
Zamalek	1
El Minya	0

Round of 16; 7 December 2017 – 13 April 2018
Al Ahly	2
El Dakhleya	0
Al Assiouty Sport	3
Al Ittihad	1
Smouha	2
Petrojet	1
Wadi Degla	1
Al Masry	0
Misr Lel Makkasa	0 (5)
Al Mokawloon (p)	0 (6)
FC Masr	0
Ismaily	1
El Gouna	0
El Entag El Harby	1
Haras El Hodoud	0
Zamalek	3

Quarter-finals; 14 April – 2 May 2018
Al Ahly	0
Al Assiouty Sport	1
Smouha (p)	0 (3)
Wadi Degla	0 (1)
Al Mokawloon	0
Ismaily	2
El Entag El Harby	1
Zamalek	3

Semi-finals; 7–8 May 2018
Al Assiouty Sport	1 (3)
Smouha (p)	1 (4)
Ismaily	1
Zamalek	4

Final; 15 May 2018
Smouha	1 (4)
Zamalek (p)	1 (5)
