= Mohamed Ashraf Roqa =

Egyptian footballer (born 1993)

Personal information
- Date of birth: 20 May 1993 (age 33)
- Place of birth: Egypt
- Position: Midfielder

Team information
- Current team: Haras El Hodoud
- Number: 14

Senior career*
Years	Team	Apps	(Gls)
2014–2014	Petrojet		
2014–2017	Tala'ea El Gaish	82	(6)
2017–2024	Zamalek	90	(5)
2018–2019	→ ENPPI SC (loan)	32	(1)
2019–2020	→ Tala'ea El Gaish (loan)	11	(0)

International career
2015	Egypt	1	(0)
- * Club domestic league appearances and goals

Mohamed Ashraf Mohamed Tawfik (Arabic: محمد أشرف; born 20 May 1993), commonly known as Roqa, is an Egyptian professional footballer who plays as a midfielder for Haras El Hodoud.

== Honours ==
Zamalek

- Egyptian Premier League: 2020-21, 2021–22
- Egypt Cup: 2017–18, 2021
- CAF Confederation Cup: 2023–24
