= Amr El Halwani =

Egyptian footballer (born 1985)

Personal information
- Full name: Amr El Halwani
- Date of birth: 15 March 1985 (age 41)
- Place of birth: Monufia, Egypt
- Height: 1.78 m (5 ft 10 in)
- Positions: Left midfielder; left back

Youth career
- Al Ahly

Senior career*
Years	Team	Apps	(Gls)
2005–2008	Apollon Kalamarias	16	(0)
2008–2009	Veria	29	(3)
2009	Ethnikos Piraeus	11	(2)
2010	→ Ionikos Nikea (loan)	14	(1)
2010–2019	Enppi		
2019–	Haras El Hodoud	0	(0)

International career^{‡}
2005	Egypt U20	?	(?)
2017	Egypt	1	(0)
- * Club domestic league appearances and goals as of 25 May 2013 ‡ National team caps and goals as of 6 June 2018

Amr El Halwani (Arabic: عمرو الحلواني) (born 15 March 1985 in Monufia) is an Egyptian footballer. He last played for Ceramcia Cleopatra FC in the Egyptian Premier League, as a left midfielder.
