= Ahmed Felix =

Egyptian footballer (born 1988)

Personal information
- Full name: Ahmed Fathi Hamza
- Date of birth: February 2, 1988 (age 38)
- Position: Central midfielder

Team information
- Current team: Al Nasr

Youth career
- Petrojet

Senior career*
Years	Team	Apps	(Gls)
–2013	Petrojet		
2013–2014	El Raja SC		
2014–	Al Nasr		
- * Club domestic league appearances and goals as of 13 September 2017

Ahmed Fathi Hamza (Arabic: أحمد فتحي حمزة; born February 2, 1988), known as Ahmed Felix, is an Egyptian professional footballer who plays as a central midfielder for the Egyptian club Haras El Hodood SC. In 2013, Felix left Petrojet SC in a free transfer to the promoted team to Egyptian first tier, El Raja SC, for 80k Egyptian pounds by season, and in 2017, he signed 3-year contract for Al Nasr from El Raja SC.
