= Ahmed Saber =

Egyptian footballer (born 1968)

Personal information
- Date of birth: 11 April 1968 (age 58)
- Place of birth: Egypt
- Position: Goalkeeper

Senior career*
Years	Team	Apps	(Gls)
1988–2004	Al Mokawloon Al Arab		

International career
1997–1998	Egypt	1	(0)
- * Club domestic league appearances and goals

Ahmed Saber (Arabic: أحمد صابر; born 11 April 1968) is an Egyptian retired professional footballer who played as a goalkeeper.

== Club career ==
Saber spent his all professional career in the Egyptian Premier League with Al Mokawloon Al Arab.

== International career ==
Saber earned his first and only senior cap for Egypt in a friendly game away against Ghana on 3 December 1997. He was also a part of Egypt national football team at the 1998 African Cup of Nations.

== Honours ==
Egypt

- African Cup of Nations: 1998
