= Yaya Sanou =

Burkinabé footballer

Personal information
- Date of birth: 29 December 1993 (age 32)
- Place of birth: Bobo-Dioulasso, Burkina Faso
- Height: 1.86 m (6 ft 1 in)
- Position: Defender

Team information
- Current team: Beni Suef

Senior career*
Years	Team	Apps	(Gls)
2015–2018	ASF Bobo Dioulasso		
2018–2019	ENPPI	3	(0)
2019–	Beni Suef	0	(0)

International career^{‡}
2017–	Burkina Faso	5	(0)
- * Club domestic league appearances and goals as of 15:55, 25 January 2019 (UTC) ‡ National team caps and goals as of 15:55, 25 January 2019 (UTC)

Yaya Sanou (born 29 December 1993) is a Burkinabé international footballer who plays for Egyptian club Beni Suef, as a defender.

== Career ==
Born in Bobo-Dioulasso, he has played club football for ASF Bobo Dioulasso, ENPPI and Beni Suef.

He made his international debut for Burkina Faso in 2017.
