= Fady Farid =

Egyptian footballer

Personal information
- Date of birth: 12 February 1997 (age 29)
- Place of birth: Cairo, Egypt
- Height: 1.86 m (6 ft 1 in)
- Position: Centre-forward

Team information
- Current team: Al Ittihad Alexandria
- Number: 9

Youth career
- 2008–2019: Al Ahly

Senior career*
Years	Team	Apps	(Gls)
2017	→ Sharkia (loan)		
2018	→ Al-Nasr Salalah (loan)		
2018–2019	→ El Gouna (loan)		
2019	Al Ahly		
2019–2020	Aswan	23	(8)
2020–2023	National Bank of Egypt	57	(7)
2022–2023	→ Al Mokawloon Al Arab (loan)	29	(2)
2023–2024	Smouha	27	(8)
2024–	Al Ittihad Alexandria	42	(5)

International career
	Egypt U20	7	(3)
2020–2021	Egypt U23		
- * Club domestic league appearances and goals as of 17 March 2026

Fady Farid (born 12 February 1997) is an Egyptian footballer who plays as a centre-forward for Al Ittihad in the Egyptian Premier League.

== Club career ==
Farid began his football career at Al Ahly SC in 2008.

In January 2018, he was loaned to Al-Nasr Club of Oman until the end of the season.

In August 2019, he completed his transfer to Aswan SC, recently promoted to the Premier League. In November 2020, Farid transferred to National Bank of Egypt SC.

On 9 September 2024, he signed with Al Ittihad Alexandria in a 6 million Egyptian pound deal, securing a three-season contract.

== Honours ==
Al-Nasr

- Sultan Qaboos Cup: 2017–2018
