= Abdel Hamid Bassiouny =

Egyptian football manager (born 1971)

Abd El-Hamid Bassiouny
Personal information
- Full name: Abdel Hamid Bassiouny
- Date of birth: 15 December 1971 (age 54)
- Place of birth: Kafr El-Sheikh, Egypt
- Position: Forward

Senior career*
Years	Team	Apps	(Gls)
?–1997	Kafr El Sheikh		
1997–2000	Zamalek	44	(18)
2000–2003	Ismaily		
2003–2009	Haras El-Hodood		

International career
1999–2001	Egypt	14	(3)

Managerial career
- 2009–2012: Haras (Assist.)
- 2012–2012: Haras (Caretaker)
- 2012–2013: Haras (Assist.)
- 2013–2013: Haras (Caretaker)
- 2013–2014: Haras (Assist.)
- 2014–2015: Haras
- 2016–2016: Haras
- 2017–2018: Mirbat SC
- 2019–2019: Zamalek SC (Assist.)
- 2019–2020: El Gaish (Assist.)
- 2020–2022: El Gaish
- 2022: Ghazl El Mahalla
- 2022: Smouha
- 2023-2025: El Gaish
- 2026: Ismaily
- * Club domestic league appearances and goals

Abdel Hamid Bassiouny (Arabic: عبد الحميد بسيوني; born 15 December 1971) is an Egyptian football manager and former player. He played in Egypt for Kafr El-Sheikh, Zamalek, Ismaily and Haras El-Hodood.

== Managerial statistics ==
As of match played 3 November 2020

Managerial record by team and tenure
Team	From	To	Record					Ref.
Team	From	To	P	W	D	L	Win %	Ref.
Haras (Caretaker)	23 May 2012	23 June 2012	0	0	0	0	—	
Haras (Caretaker)	7 July 2013	21 July 2013	0	0	0	0	—	
Haras	3 February 2014	16 November 2015	63	16	26	21	25.4	
Haras	1 March 2016	15 December 2016	29	12	6	11	41.4	
Mirbat SC	4 December 2017	1 July 2018	13	6	1	6	46.2	
Tala'ea	20 January 2020	3 November 2020	23	8	11	4	34.8	
Total			128	42	44	42	32.8	—
