= Mahmoud Shabana =

Egyptian footballer (born 1995)

Personal information
- Date of birth: April 6, 1995 (age 31)
- Place of birth: Damietta, Egypt
- Height: 1.82 m (6 ft 0 in)
- Position: Centre-back

Team information
- Current team: Al Ittihad

Senior career*
Years	Team	Apps	(Gls)
–2016	Petrojet	0	(0)
2016–2017	Alassiouty SC	0	(0)
2017–2020	FC Masr	0	(0)
2018–2019	→ ENPPI (loan)	0	(0)
2020–2021	Aswan	0	(0)
2021–2023	Zamalek SC	13	(1)
2022	→ Al Ittihad (loan)	0	(0)
2022–2023	→ Smouha (loan)	0	(0)
2023–	Al Ittihad	0	(0)
- * Club domestic league appearances and goals

Mahmoud Mohamed Taher Shabana (Arabic: محمود شبانة; born 6 April 1995) is an Egyptian professional footballer who plays as a centre-back for Egyptian Premier League club Al Ittihad.
