= Joseph Ochaya =

Ugandan footballer (born 1993)

Personal information
- Full name: Joseph Benson Ochaya
- Date of birth: 14 December 1993 (age 32)
- Place of birth: Kampala, Uganda
- Height: 1.82 m (6 ft 0 in)
- Position: Left back

Team information
- Current team: Al Mokawloon Al Arab
- Number: 23

Senior career*
Years	Team	Apps	(Gls)
2010	Kampala City Council		
2011	Navibank Sài Gòn	11	(3)
2011–2012	Kampala City Council		
2012–2014	Asante Kotoko	18	(1)
2015–2017	Kampala CC		
2017–2018	Lusaka Dynamos		
2018–2022	TP Mazembe		
2022–	Al Mokawloon Al Arab		

International career^{‡}
2012–	Uganda	57	(3)
- * Club domestic league appearances and goals as of 21:22, 5 January 2017 (UTC) ‡ National team caps and goals as of 10:38, 20 January 2024 (UTC)

Joseph Benson Ochaya (born 14 December 1993) is a Ugandan professional footballer who plays for Egyptian club Al Mokawloon Al Arab and the Uganda national team as a left back.

Ochaya has played club football for Kampala City Council/Kampala Capital City Authority, Navibank Sài Gòn, Asante Kotoko, and Lusaka Dynamos, TP Mazembe and Al Mokawloon Al Arab.

== Club career ==
Born in Kampala, Ochaya began his senior career at Kampala City Council.

In November 2012, he moved from Kampala City Council to Ghanaian club Asante Kotoko for a fee reported to be $30,000. He went on trial with German club SpVgg Greuther Fürth in August 2013. He was the Uganda Premier League 'Most Valuable Player' for the 2015–16 season, while playing for Kampala Capital City Authority. A move to South African club Bidvest Wits in August 2016 fell through.

In March 2017, Ochaya completed his transfer to Zambian club Lusaka Dynamos. In October 2018, he signed with Congolese club TP Mazembe. In September 2022, he joined Egyptian club Al Mokawloon Al Arab.

== International career ==
Ochaya received his first call-up to the Ugandan national team in September 2012, making his debut later that year. He has appeared in FIFA World Cup qualifying matches. He was a squad member at the 2016 African Nations Championship.

== Career statistics ==
=== International ===
As of matches played on 1 August 2019

Uganda national team
Year	Apps	Goals
2012	6	0
2013	1	0
2014	3	0
2015	10	0
2016	13	1
2017	7	0
2018	5	1
2019	1	0
Total	46	2

=== International goals ===
Scores and results list Uganda's goal tally first.

No	Date	Venue	Opponent	Score	Result	Competition
1.	19 January 2016	Umuganda Stadium, Gisenyi, Rwanda	Mali	1–0	2–2	2016 African Nations Championship
2.	24 March 2018	Mandela National Stadium, Kampala, Uganda	São Tomé and Príncipe	1–0	3–1	Friendly
