= Ramy Sabry (footballer) =

Egyptian footballer (born 1987)

Personal information
- Full name: Ramy Mohamed Sabry Mansour
- Date of birth: 5 January 1987 (age 39)
- Place of birth: Alexandria, Egypt
- Height: 1.87 m (6 ft 2 in)
- Position: Center-back

Team information
- Current team: Pharco
- Number: 8

Youth career
- –2004: Olympic Club
- 2004–2006: ENPPI

Senior career*
Years	Team	Apps	(Gls)
2006–2021	ENPPI	230	(30)
2021–	Pharco	65	(3)
- * Club domestic league appearances and goals as of 28 August 2024

Ramy Mohamed Sabry Mansour (Arabic: رامي محمد صبري منصور; born 5 January 1987), is an Egyptian footballer who plays as a center-back for Egyptian Premier League side Pharco.

== Honours ==
ENPPI

- Egypt Cup: 2010–11
