= Omar Bassam =

Egyptian footballer

Personal information
- Full name: Omar Bassam Mohamed Helmy
- Date of birth: 17 December 1993 (age 32)
- Place of birth: Cairo, Egypt
- Height: 1.89 m (6 ft 2 in)
- Position: Striker

Team information
- Current team: Ittihad Gharyan

Youth career
- –2012: Telecom Egypt
- 2012–2015: Al Ahly

Senior career*
Years	Team	Apps	(Gls)
2014	Al Ahly	2	(0)
2015–2016	Smouha	0	(0)
2016	→ El Dakhleya (loan)	0	(0)
2016–2017	Aswan	12	(2)
2017	Tanta	9	(0)
2017–2018	Al Assiouty Sport	25	(6)
2018–2019	Misr Lel Makkasa	6	(0)
2019–2021	Enppi		
2021–2022	Al Mokawloon Al Arab		
2022–2023	Haras El Hodoud		
2023–2024	Shabab Al Ghar		
2024–2025	Bish		
2025–	Ittihad Gharyan		

International career
- Egypt U20
- * Club domestic league appearances and goals

Omar Bassam Mohamed Helmy (born 17 December 1993) is an Egyptian professional footballer who plays as a striker for Libyan club Ittihad Gharyan.

He is the brother of goalkeeper Mohamed Bassam. A product of the Telecom Egypt youth system, he later joined the youth ranks of Al Ahly, and has also played for Smouha, Aswan, Tanta, Al Assiouty Sport, Misr Lel Makkasa, Enppi, Al Mokawloon Al Arab, Haras El Hodoud and Bish.

== Club career ==
Born in Cairo, Bassam studies at the Faculty of Arts. He began his career with Telecom Egypt, where he appeared for the team and joined the youth national team under coach Rabie Yassin. He then joined the youth ranks of Al Ahly, and was promoted to the first team in 2014 under then-Al Ahly coach Mohamed Youssef. He made his first Egyptian Premier League appearance for the first team on 3 February 2014, against El Dakhleya, in the second round of the league. Al Ahly's own player page lists two league appearances for him in 2014, and Yallakora notes that he first appeared for the club in 2013–14, a season in which Al Ahly won the league.

While with Al Ahly's youth team he suffered a knee injury on duty with the Olympic national team, and scans showed a partial tear of the cruciate ligament. He then joined Smouha and was loaned to El Dakhleya on 26 January 2016, returning to Smouha when the loan ended on 30 June 2016.

He joined Aswan on a free transfer on 17 August 2016, and then Tanta on 15 January 2017. In August 2017 he joined Al Assiouty Sport, after Tanta's technical staff released him. He then moved to Misr Lel Makkasa in 2018 and to Enppi in January 2019, where he played until 2021. He signed for Al Mokawloon Al Arab in 2021 and for Haras El Hodoud on a free transfer in October 2022. In 2023–24 he played for Libyan club Shabab Al Ghar, and in 2024 he joined Saudi Third Division club Bish on a free transfer on a two-season contract. In November 2025 he moved to Libyan club Ittihad Gharyan, and he is listed in the club's squad as a forward.

== Records ==
On 3 November 2016, Bassam scored for Aswan in the 49th minute of their league match against Al Nasr Lel Taa'den, heading in from a corner, and became the first player to score in the Aswan derby, which was being played in the Egyptian Premier League for the first time. Haitham Mostafa equalised for Al Nasr three minutes later, and Al Nasr went on to win the match 2–1.

== Personal life ==
Bassam's brother, Mohamed Bassam, is a professional goalkeeper. In November 2021, VAR disallowed a goal by Omar for Al Mokawloon Al Arab against Tala'ea El Gaish, where Mohamed was in goal.
