= Abdallah Gomaa Awad =

Egyptian footballer (born 1993)

Personal information
- Date of birth: February 26, 1993 (age 33)
- Position: Right-back

Team information
- Current team: Enppi
- Number: 28

Youth career
- Enppi

Senior career*
Years	Team	Apps	(Gls)
2014−2015	Al-Nasr	31	(1)
2015−2016	Al-Masry	15	(0)
2016−	Enppi	13	(0)
- * Club domestic league appearances and goals as of 08 August 2017

Abdallah Gomaa Awad (Arabic: عبد الله جمعة عوض; born February 26, 1993) is an Egyptian professional footballer who currently plays as a right-back for the Egyptian club Enppi. In 2014, he joined Al-Nasr in a free transfer from Enppi, two years later, Enppi signed him by a 3-year contract from Al-Masry.
