= Emad Fathy =

Egyptian footballer (born 1993)

Personal information
- Full name: Emad Fathy
- Date of birth: 6 January 1993 (age 33)
- Place of birth: Egypt
- Position: Midfielder

Team information
- Current team: Al Masry
- Number: 19

Senior career*
| Years | Team | Apps | (Gls) |
| 2014–2016 | Damietta | | |
| 2016–2018 | Misr Lel Makkasa | 27 | (0) |
| 2018–2019 | Zamalek | 13 | (2) |
| 2018–2019 | → ENPPI (loan) | 22 | (2) |
| 2019– | Al Masry | 4 | (1) |
- * Club domestic league appearances and goals as of 13:04, 17 December 2019 (UTC)

Emad Fathy (Arabic: عماد فتحي; born 6 January 1993), is an Egyptian footballer who plays for Egyptian Premier League side Aswan SC as a midfielder.

== Honours ==
=== Zamalek ===
- Egypt Cup: 2017–18
