= Fady Nagah =

Egyptian footballer (born 1990)

Personal information
- Full name: Fady Mohamed Nagah Fathi
- Date of birth: 19 May 1990 (age 36)
- Place of birth: Egypt
- Position: Centre back

Team information
- Current team: Al Mokawloon

Senior career*
| Years | Team | Apps | (Gls) |
| 2010–2013 | Haras El Hodoud | 29 | (0) |
| 2013–2014 | Petrojet | 11 | (0) |
| 2014–2015 | Smouha | 2 | (0) |
| 2015–2018 | El Entag El Harby | 47 | (0) |
| 2018 | Mauerwerk Sport Admira | 1 | (0) |
| 2018–2019 | ENPPI | 5 | (0) |
| 2019–2022 | Al Mokawloon | 26 | (0) |
- * Club domestic league appearances and goals

Fady Mohamed Nagah Fathi (Arabic: فَادِي مُحَمَّد نَجَاح فَتْحِيّ; born 9 May 1990) is an Egyptian football player who is currently plays for Al Mokawloon as a defender.

He formerly played for Haras El Hodoud SC, Petrojet FC and Smouha SC.

== Career ==
On 28 February 2019, Nagah joined Mauerwerk Sport Admira in Austria.
