= John Okoli =

Nigerian footballer

Personal information
- Date of birth: 3 July 1997 (age 29)
- Place of birth: Lagos, Nigeria
- Height: 1.80 m (5 ft 11 in)
- Position: Forward

Team information
- Current team: Churchill Brothers

Youth career
- 2009–2012: Soccer Warriors
- 2012–2015: Messiah Academy

Senior career*
Years	Team	Apps	(Gls)
2016–2017	MFM FC	12	(5)
2017–2018	Yenicami	27	(9)
2018–2019	Gönyeli	30	(22)
2019–2020	Göçmenköy İYSK	30	(20)
2020–2021	Saif SC	22	(18)
2021–2023	Al Mokawloon	48	(13)
2023–2024	Asswehly	7	(7)
2024–2025	Al-Karma	3	(5)
2025–2026	Al Hilal Benghazi	13	(2)
2026–	Churchill Brothers	3	(0)
- * Club domestic league appearances and goals as of 5 November 2026

John Okoli (born 3 July 1997) is a Nigerian professional footballer who currently plays as a striker for Indian Super League club Churchill Brothers.

== Career ==
=== Early career ===
Okoli started his career with Lagos-based Soccer Warriors. He then moved to Messiah Academy, where he scored 29 goals in 17 appearances. In the 2016/17 season, he joined Nigeria Professional Football League club MFM F.C.

=== Yenicami Ağdelen ===
Okoli's first professional move was on 9 September 2017, when joined Northern Cypriot club Yenicami SK for the 2017–2018 season. He scored 8 league goals and 1 goal in Tashsin Mertekci Cyprus Cup taking his goal tally to 9 goals in 27 helping the club win the Süper Lig 2017–2018 title.

=== Gonyeli S.K. ===
Okoli joined Gonyeli S.K. on 17 August 2018 on loan until the end of the season. He scored 22 goals in 30 appearances for Gonyeli.

=== Göçmenköy İdman Yurdu ===
On 3 September 2019, the website Futbalgalore.com reported that Okoli will play on loan at Gocmenkoy in the 2019/2020 season.

== Honours ==
=== Club ===
MFM FC

Lagos (1): 2017

Yenicami Ağdelen

- Süper Lig (1): 2017–18
