= Mohamed Bassiouny =

Egyptian footballer (born 1989)

Personal information
- Date of birth: August 8, 1989 (age 37)
- Position: Attacking midfielder

Team information
- Current team: National Bank
- Number: 23

Senior career*
Years	Team	Apps	(Gls)
–2014	Al-Masry	12	(0)
2011–2013	?Al-Merrikh (loan)		
2014–2016	Ittihad El Shorta	67	(3)
2016–2020	Enppi	17	(2)
2020–	National Bank	114	(4)
- * Club domestic league appearances and goals as of 09 August 2017

Mohamed Bassiouny (Arabic: محمد بسيوني; born August 8, 1989) is an Egyptian professional footballer who currently plays as an attacking midfielder for the Egyptian club National Bank. He joined from Enppi.
