= Mohamed Salem (footballer, born 1994) =

Egyptian footballer (born 1994)

Personal information
- Full name: Mohamed Salem Ali Abdel Kader
- Date of birth: 18 December 1994 (age 31)
- Place of birth: Egypt
- Position: Forward

Team information
- Current team: Smouha (on loan from Al Mokawloon)

Youth career
- Al Mokawloon Al Arab

Senior career*
Years	Team	Apps	(Gls)
2013–2015	Al Mokawloon Al Arab	52	(14)
2015–2017	Zamalek	7	(2)
2016–2017	→ Al Ittihad (loan)	14	(2)
2017–2019	Petrojet	32	(3)
2019	El Dakhleya	8	(2)
2019–	Al Mokawloon	3	(1)
2024–	→ Smouha (loan)		

International career
2015	Egypt U-23	5	(1)
2015	Egypt	1	(0)
- * Club domestic league appearances and goals as of 17:56, 2 March 2019 (UTC)

Mohamed Salem Ali Abdel Kader (Arabic: مُحَمَّد سَالِم عَلِيّ عَبْد الْقَادِر; born 18 December 1994), is an Egyptian footballer who plays for Egyptian Premier League side Smouha on loan from Al Mokawloon Al Arab SC as a forward.
