= Mahmoud Gad =

Egyptian footballer (born 1998)

Personal information
- Full name: Mahmoud Gad Mahmoud Ahmed
- Date of birth: 1 October 1998 (age 28)
- Place of birth: El Senbellawein, Dakahlia, Egypt
- Height: 1.91 m (6 ft 3 in)
- Position: Goalkeeper

Team information
- Current team: Pyramids
- Number: 28

Youth career
- –2018: ENPPI

Senior career*
Years	Team	Apps	(Gls)
2018–2022	ENPPI	82	(0)
2022–2025	Al Masry	48	(0)
2025–	Pyramids		

International career
- Egypt U23
- Egypt
- * Club domestic league appearances and goals

Mahmoud Gad Mahmoud Ahmed (Arabic: محمود جاد محمود أحمد; born 1 October 1998) is an Egyptian footballer who plays as a goalkeeper for Egyptian Premier League club Pyramids FC.

== Honours ==
Pyramids

- CAF Super Cup: 2025
- FIFA African–Asian–Pacific Cup: 2025
