= Hossam Hassan (footballer, born 1993) =

Egyptian footballer

Personal information
- Full name: Hossam Hassan Abdel Badie Mohamed El-Hamzawy
- Date of birth: 2 September 1993 (age 33)
- Place of birth: Banha, El Qalyubia, Egypt
- Height: 1.80 m (5 ft 11 in)
- Position: Forward

Team information
- Current team: Al Ittihad

Youth career
- MS Sheblenga
- Tala'ea El Gaish

Senior career*
| Years | Team | Apps | (Gls) |
| 2012–2014 | Tala'ea El Gaish | 13 | (1) |
| 2014–2016 | El Dakhleya | 24 | (2) |
| 2016–2021 | Smouha | 140 | (44) |
| 2021–2021 | → Al-Ahli Tripoli SC (loan) | 9 | (5) |
| 2021–2023 | Al Ahly | 25 | (2) |
| 2023-2025 | Smouha | 67 | (22) |
| 2025-2026 | Modern Sport FC | 32 | (2) |
| 2026- | Al Ittihad | 0 | (0) |

International career
| 2019– | Egypt | 3 | (0) |
- * Club domestic league appearances and goals as of 11/07/26 @ 15:51(AEST)

Hossam Hassan Abdel Badie Mohamed El-Hamzawy (Arabic: حسام حسن عبدالبديع محمد الحمزاوي; born 2 September 1993) is an Egyptian professional footballer who plays as forward for the Egypt national team.

== Club career ==
Hossam started his club career in 2012–2013 season with Tala'ea El Gaish.

He then played with El Dakhleya in 2014–2015 season, during which he scored many goals which kept El Dakhleya club in the Egyptian Premier League.

He later joined Smouha in 2016 winter transfers. He played with Smouha 154 matches in which he scored 49 goals which made him the top-scoring player in the club history in the Egyptian Premier League.

In the 2020–21 season Hassan went on loan to Libyan Premier League club Al-Ahli Tripoli SC, reaching the finals of the Libyan Premier league only to miss out on the League title by missing a kick in the penalty shootouts.

== International career ==
He made his debut for the Egypt national football team on 14 October 2019 in a friendly against Botswana. He played with the Egypt national team for 3 matches and did not score any goals.

== Honours ==
Al Ahly

- Egyptian Premier League: 2022–23
- Egypt Cup: 2021–22
- CAF Champions League: 2022–23
