= Haras El Hodoud Stadium =

Multi-purpose stadium in Alexandria, Egypt

Coordinates: 31°09′03″N 29°50′54″E

- El-Max Stadium
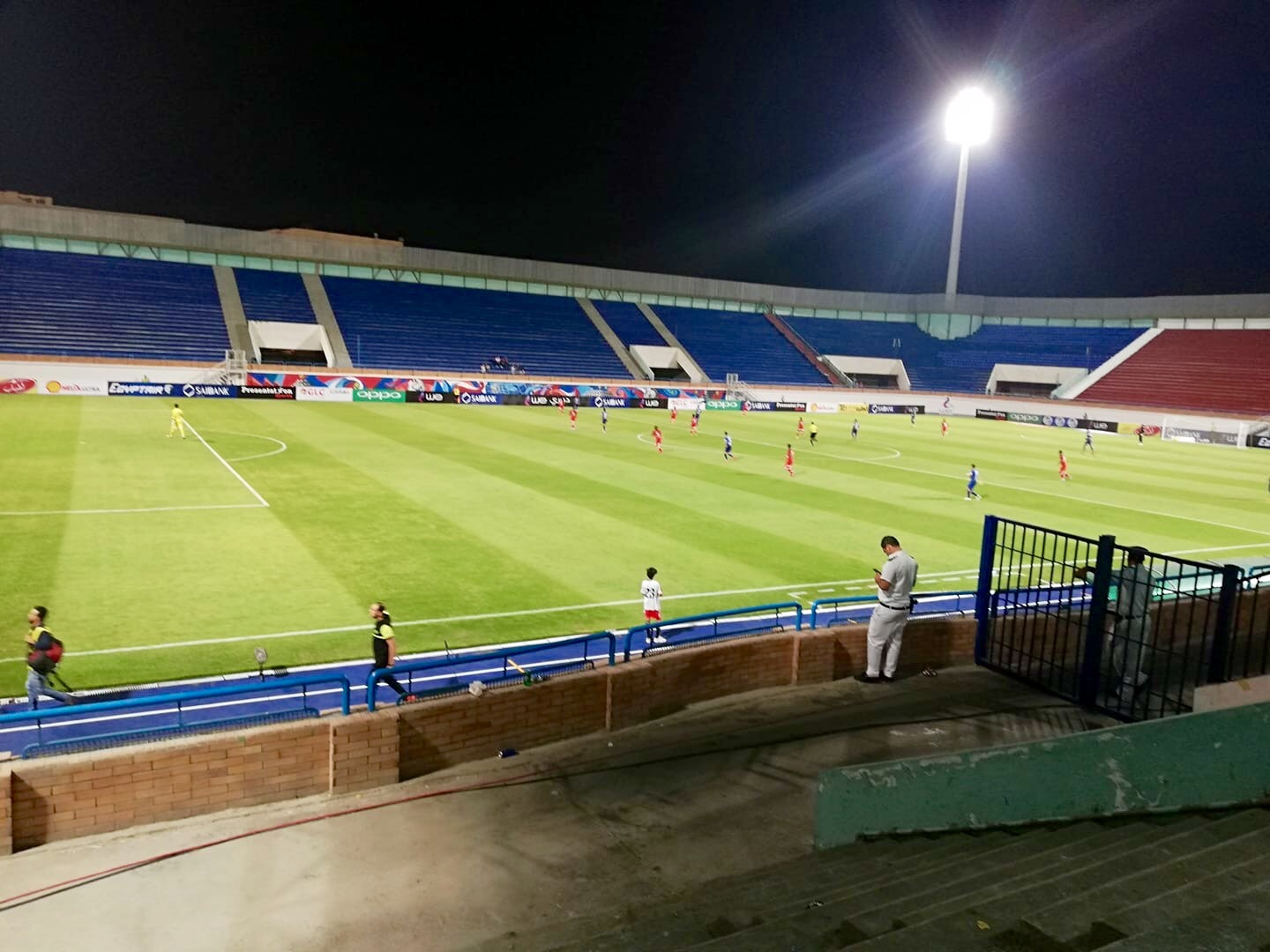
- Interactive map of Haras El Hodoud Stadium
- Location: El Max, Alexandria, Egypt
- Owner: Haras El-Hodood Club
- Capacity: 22,000
- Surface: Grass

Tenants
- Haras El-Hodood Club; El Raja Marsa Matruh; Smouha SC

Haras El Hodoud Stadium (Border Guard Stadium) is a multi-purpose stadium in Alexandria, Egypt. It is used mostly for football matches, and was used for the 2006 African Cup of Nations. The stadium holds 22,000 people. The pitch is surrounded by an athletics track, rectangular in shape & therefore having 90 degrees corners, rather than the conventional curve. The stadium is home to Haras El-Hodood and El Raja Marsa Matruh.

== See also ==
- Alexandria Stadium
- Borg El Arab Stadium
- Sports in Alexandria
