= Haras El Hodoud SC =

Association football club in Alexandria, Egypt

Haras el-Hodoud SC
- Full name: Haras el-Hodoud Sporting Club
- Nickname: El Sawahel
- Short name: HRS
- Founded: 1932; 94 years ago (as Khafr El Sawahel); 16 July 1974; 52 years ago (as Haras El Hodood)
- Ground: Haras el-Hodoud Stadium
- Capacity: 22,000
- Coordinates: 31°09′03″N 29°50′54″E
- Chairman: Abdel Hakim Ibrahim
- Manager: Haytham Shaaban
- League: Egyptian Premier League
- 2024–25: 9th
Home colours	Away colours

Haras el-Hodoud Sporting Club (Arabic: نادي حرس الحدود الرياضي, lit. 'Border Guard Club') is an Egyptian professional sports club based in El Max, Alexandria. It is best known for its professional football team, that competes in the Egyptian Premier League.

== History ==
Haras El Hodood was founded in 1932 under the name of El-Sawahel Social Sporting Club, before being renamed to its current name, after the Egyptian Border Guard Corps, on 16 July 1974.

They were in the first place after 14 matches in the 2011–12 Egyptian Premier League, before the season was cancelled due to the Port Said Stadium riot on 1 February. In the 2019–20 Egyptian Premier League season, Haras El Hodood finished 16th to be relegated to the Egyptian Second Division, the second tier of the Egyptian football league system.

== Crest ==
Former logo

Present logo

== Honours ==
- Egyptian Second Division
  - Winners (1): 2017–18 (Group C)
- Egypt Cup
  - Winners (2): 2008–09, 2009–10
- Egyptian Super Cup
  - Winners (1): 2009

== Performance in CAF competitions ==
- PR = Preliminary round
- FR = First round
- SR = Second round
- PO = Play-off round

Season	Competition	Round	Country	Club	Home	Away	Aggregate
2006	CAF Confederation Cup	PR	Libya	Al Akhdar	4–0	0–1	4–1
2006	CAF Confederation Cup	FR	Guinea	AS Kaloum Star	6–0	1–0	7–0
2006	CAF Confederation Cup	SR	Nigeria	Heartland	0–0	2–3	2–3
2008	CAF Confederation Cup	FR	Algeria	MC Alger	1–0	0–0	1–0
2008	CAF Confederation Cup	SR	Libya	Al Akhdar	1–0	1–1	2–1
2008	CAF Confederation Cup	PO	South Africa	Mamelodi Sundowns	2–0	0–1	2–1
2008	CAF Confederation Cup	Group A	Tunisia	CS Sfaxien	3–1	0–1	2nd
2008	CAF Confederation Cup	Group A	Angola	Inter de Luanda	4–1	0–1	2nd
2008	CAF Confederation Cup	Group A	Tunisia	Club Africain	2–1	1–1	2nd
2009	CAF Confederation Cup	FR	Rwanda	APR	2–0	0–0	2–0
2009	CAF Confederation Cup	SR	Tunisia	EGS Gafsa	3–0	3–1	6–1
2009	CAF Confederation Cup	PO	Libya	Al Ahli Tripoli	2–1	0–0	2–1
2009	CAF Confederation Cup	Group B	Nigeria	Bayelsa United	1–0	0–2	4th
2009	CAF Confederation Cup	Group B	Angola	1º de Agosto	5–1	0–1	4th
2009	CAF Confederation Cup	Group B	Mali	Stade Malien	1–1	0–2	4th
2010	CAF Confederation Cup	FR	Ethiopia	Banks	5–0	1–1	6–1
2010	CAF Confederation Cup	SR	Tanzania	Simba	5–1	1–2	6–3
2010	CAF Confederation Cup	PO	Botswana	Gaborone United	8–1	0–1	8–2
2010	CAF Confederation Cup	Group B	Tunisia	CS Sfaxien	0–0	1–3	4th
2010	CAF Confederation Cup	Group B	Morocco	FUS Rabat	1–2	0–1	4th
2010	CAF Confederation Cup	Group B	Zambia	Zanaco	1–1	1–1	4th
2011	CAF Confederation Cup	FR	Ethiopia	Dedebit	4–0	1–1	5–1
2011	CAF Confederation Cup	SR	DR Congo	DC Motema Pembe	2–1	1–2	3–3 (3–4 p)

== Players ==
=== Current squad ===
As of 9 April, 2026. Note: Flags indicate national team as defined under FIFA eligibility rules; some limited exceptions apply. Players may hold more than one non-FIFA nationality.

No.	Pos.	Nation	Player
1	GK	EGY	Ayman Ragab
2	DF	EGY	Mohamed Abdel Ghani
3	DF	EGY	Mahmoud El Badry
4	DF	EGY	Islam Abou Salima
5	DF	EGY	Ibrahim Abdelhakim
6	MF	EGY	Mohamed Magli
7	FW	TUN	Aziz Abid
8	MF	EGY	Youssef Marie
9	FW	EGY	Amr Gamal
10	MF	EGY	Fawzi El Henawy
11	MF	EGY	Mohamed Mostafa
12	MF	EGY	Mohamed Bayoumi
13	GK	EGY	Amr Shaaban
14	MF	EGY	Mohamed Ashraf Roqa
16	GK	EGY	Adham Seha
17	DF	EGY	Mohamed El Deghemy
18	GK	EGY	Mahmoud El Zanfaly

No.	Pos.	Nation	Player
19	FW	EGY	Ahmed El Sheikh
20	MF	NGA	Emeka Christian Eze
22	MF	EGY	Omar Saviola
24	DF	EGY	Momen Awad
25	FW	EGY	Ismail Ashraf
27	MF	NGA	Ikenna Cooper
29	FW	EGY	Mohamed El Negely
30	MF	EGY	Abdallah Hafez
33	DF	EGY	Moataz Mohamed
37	FW	GHA	Moses Twum
40	FW	NGA	Emmanuel Damilola
44	DF	EGY	Youssef Sabra
45	DF	CIV	Kouassi Kouadja
55	DF	EGY	Mohamed Hassan
74	FW	EGY	Mohamed Ouka
90	MF	EGY	Ahmed Nayel
99	FW	EGY	Mohamed Hamdi

=== Notable players ===
- (Egypt) Ahmed Eid Abdel Malek (2004–2012)
- (Egypt) Mohamed El Shenawy (2012–2013)
- (Egypt) Emam Ashour (2018–2019)
- (Ethiopia) Gatoch Panom (2019–2020)
- (Egypt) Mostafa Ziko (2019–2023)

== Managers ==
- (Egypt) Helmy Toulan (July 1, 2002 – June 30, 2006)
- (Egypt) Tarek El Ashry (July 1, 2006 – May 23, 2012)
- (Egypt) Helmy Toulan (July 1, 2012 – July 6, 2013)
- (Egypt) Abu-Taleb Al-Essawy (July 21, 2013 – Feb 3, 2014)
- (Egypt) Abdul Hamid Bassiouny (Feb 3, 2014 – Dec 2015)
- (Egypt) Ahmed Ayoub (Dec 2015 – 2016)
- (Egypt) Tarek El Ashry (Sep 18, 2018 – Feb 20, 2020)
- (Egypt) Mohamed Halim (Feb 20, 2020 – Sep 15, 2020)
- (Egypt) Tarek El Ashry (Sep 15, 2020 – Oct 9, 2020)
- (Egypt) Mohamed Halim (Oct 9, 2020 – present)
