= 2018–19 Ismaily SC season =

Ismaily
2018–19 season
- President: Ibrahim Osman
- Manager: Kheïreddine Madoui (until 23 September); Mohamed Abou Grisha (caretaker, until 3 October); Jorvan Vieira (until 11 December); Čedomir Janevski (until 27 April); Mahmoud Gaber (from 29 April)
- Stadium: Ismailia Stadium
- Egyptian Premier League: 7th
- Egypt Cup: Quarter-finals
- CAF Champions League: Group stage
- Arab Club Champions Cup: Second round
- Top goalscorer: League: Karim Bambo; Mahmoud Metwalli (6 goals each); All: Karim Bambo (9 goals)
Home colours	Away colours

The 2018–19 Ismaily season was the 96th season in the football club's history and the 48th consecutive and 56th overall season in the top flight of Egyptian football, the Egyptian Premier League, having been promoted from the Egyptian Second Division in 1962. In addition to the domestic league, Ismaily competed in this season's editions of the domestic cup, the Egypt Cup, the first-tier African cup, the CAF Champions League, and the first-tier Arab cup, the Arab Club Champions Cup. The season covered a period from 1 July 2018 to 30 June 2019; however, Ismaily played their last match in July 2019.

== Kit information ==
Supplier: Adidas

Home	Home alt.	Away	Away alt.

== Players ==
=== Current squad ===
As of 1 February 2019

Note: Flags indicate national team as defined under FIFA eligibility rules; some limited exceptions apply. Players may hold more than one non-FIFA nationality.

No.	Pos.	Nation	Player
2	DF	EGY	Baher El Mohamady (Vice-captain)
3	DF	EGY	Mohamed Magdy I
4	MF	EGY	Emad Hamdy
5	DF	GHA	Richard Baffour
9	FW	EGY	Mohamed El Shamy
10	FW	EGY	Karim Bambo
11	DF	EGY	Tarek Taha
13	DF	EGY	Alaa Abdel Azim
14	DF	EGY	Mahmoud Metwalli (Captain)
15	MF	EGY	Ahmed Ali
16	GK	EGY	Mohamed Magdy II
17	FW	NGR	Odah Marshall
20	MF	EGY	Ibrahim Abdel Khalek
21	DF	EGY	Selim Abdel Khalek
22	MF	EGY	Nader Ramadan
26	GK	EGY	Mohamed Fawzy

No.	Pos.	Nation	Player
27	FW	NAM	Benson Shilongo
28	MF	EGY	Mahmoud Abdel Aati (on loan from Zamalek)
29	DF	EGY	Mohamed Hashem
30	DF	EGY	Osama Ibrahim
31	FW	EGY	Wagih Abdel Hakim
32	FW	EGY	Abdel Rahman Magdy
33	MF	EGY	Mohamed Sadek
34	DF	EGY	Ahmed Ayman
35	MF	EGY	Mohamed El Darf
36	MF	EGY	Medhat Faqousa
38	FW	EGY	Gabry Youssef
39	FW	TAN	Yahya Zayd
41	MF	EGY	Mohamed Bayoumi
42	MF	EGY	Mostafa Fares
43	FW	EGY	Hazem Morsy
44	FW	EGY	Mahmoud Abou Gouda
-	GK	EGY	Mahmoud Reda (on loan from Wadi Degla)

=== Out on loan ===
Note: Flags indicate national team as defined under FIFA eligibility rules; some limited exceptions apply. Players may hold more than one non-FIFA nationality.

No.	Pos.	Nation	Player
—	GK	EGY	Mohamed Awad (at Al Wehda until 30 June 2019)
—	MF	EGY	Omar El Wahsh (at Misr Lel Makkasa until 30 June 2019)
—	FW	EGY	Walid Attia (at Ghazl El Mahalla until 30 June 2019)
—	FW	EGY	Ahmed El Gendy (at El Qanah until 30 June 2019)

No.	Pos.	Nation	Player
—	FW	NGR	Taro Godswill (at El Qanah until 30 June 2019)
—	FW	CMR	Christopher Mendouga (at Al Tai until 30 June 2019)
—	FW	EGY	Shoukry Naguib (at Petrojet until 30 June 2019)

== Transfers ==
=== Transfers in ===
#	Position	Player	Transferred from	Fee	Date	Source
13	DF	(Egypt) Alaa Abdel Azim	(Egypt) El Mansoura	E£800k	14 May 2018	
11	DF	(Egypt) Tarek Taha	(Egypt) Smouha	Undisclosed	29 May 2018	
18	FW	(Tunisia) Lassaâd Jaziri	(Tunisia) US Ben Guerdane	Free transfer	10 June 2018	
7	FW	(Cameroon) Christopher Mendouga	(Tunisia) JS Kairouan	Free transfer	13 June 2018	
	FW	(Nigeria) Taro Godswill	Free agent	Free transfer	13 June 2018	
3	DF	(Egypt) Mohamed Magdy I	(Egypt) Zamalek	Undisclosed	24 June 2018	
9	FW	(Egypt) Mohamed El Shamy	(Egypt) Zamalek	Undisclosed	24 June 2018	
1	GK	(Egypt) Essam El Hadary	(Saudi Arabia) Al Taawoun	Free transfer	1 July 2018	
17	MF	(Egypt) Omar Fathy	(Egypt) Pyramids	Undisclosed	16 July 2018	
21	DF	(Egypt) Selim Abdel Khalek	(Egypt) Pyramids	Undisclosed	22 July 2018	
23	FW	(Nigeria) Okiki Afolabi	(Ethiopia) Jimma Aba Jifar	Undisclosed	29 July 2018	
27	FW	(Namibia) Benson Shilongo	(Egypt) Smouha	E£5m	26 December 2018	
17	FW	(Nigeria) Odah Marshall	(Egypt) ENPPI	Free transfer	7 January 2019	
39	FW	(Tanzania) Yahya Zayd	(Tanzania) Azam	Undisclosed	7 January 2019	
30	DF	(Egypt) Osama Ibrahim	(Egypt) Smouha	Free transfer	13 January 2019	

==== Loans in ====
#	Position	Player	Loaned from	Date	Loan expires	Source
28	MF	(Egypt) Mahmoud Abdel Aati	(Egypt) Zamalek	2 January 2019	30 June 2019	
	GK	(Egypt) Mahmoud Reda	(Egypt) Wadi Degla	7 January 2019	30 June 2019	

=== Transfers out ===
Position	Player	Transferred to	Fee	Date	Source
FW	(Colombia) Diego Calderón	(Saudi Arabia) Al Faisaly	E£21m	26 May 2018	
FW	(Egypt) Ibrahim Hassan	(Egypt) Zamalek	Undisclosed	3 June 2018	
DF	(Egypt) Ahmed Dowidar	(Egypt) El Entag El Harby	E£500k	18 June 2018	
DF	(Egypt) Bahaa Magdy	(Egypt) Zamalek	E£7m	24 June 2018	
MF	(Egypt) Osama Kajo	(Egypt) Ceramica Cleopatra	Undisclosed	27 June 2018	
MF	(Egypt) Mohamed Fathy	(Egypt) Pyramids	E£17m	28 June 2018	
DF	(Egypt) Basem Abdel Aziz	Released		30 June 2018	
MF	(Egypt) Islam Abdel Naim	(Egypt) Tala'ea El Gaish	Free transfer	9 July 2018	
DF	(Egypt) Mohamed Abou El Magd	(Egypt) Tala'ea El Gaish	Free transfer	9 July 2018	
FW	(Mali) Moussa Camara	(Algeria) MO Béjaïa	Free transfer	17 July 2018	
MF	(Egypt) Ahmed El Geaidy	(Saudi Arabia) Al Raed	Undisclosed	19 July 2018	
FW	(Ghana) Thomas Abbey	(Ghana) Hearts of Oak	Free transfer	27 July 2018	
FW	(Nigeria) Okiki Afolabi	Released		1 January 2019	
MF	(Egypt) Omar Fathy	(Egypt) ENPPI	Free transfer	6 January 2019	
MF	(Egypt) Hosny Abd Rabo	Retired		16 January 2019	
FW	(Tunisia) Lassaâd Jaziri	Released		22 January 2019	
GK	(Egypt) Essam El Hadary	(Egypt) Nogoom	Free transfer	28 January 2019	

==== Loans out ====
Position	Player	Loaned to	Date	Loan expires	Source
GK	(Egypt) Mohamed Awad	(Saudi Arabia) Al Wehda	22 May 2018	30 June 2019	
FW	(Egypt) Ahmed El Gendy	(Egypt) El Qanah	29 June 2018	30 June 2019	
MF	(Egypt) Ibrahim Abdel Khalek	(Egypt) Haras El Hodoud	17 July 2018	31 January 2019	
FW	(Egypt) Walid Attia	(Egypt) Haras El Hodoud	17 July 2018	31 December 2018	
FW	(Nigeria) Taro Godswill	(Egypt) El Qanah	19 July 2018	30 June 2019	
FW	(Egypt) Shoukry Naguib	(Egypt) Petrojet	22 January 2019	30 June 2019	
FW	(Egypt) Walid Attia	(Egypt) Ghazl El Mahalla	29 January 2019	30 June 2019	
FW	(Cameroon) Christopher Mendouga	(Saudi Arabia) Al Tai	31 January 2019	30 June 2019	
MF	(Egypt) Omar El Wahsh	(Egypt) Misr Lel Makkasa	31 January 2019	30 June 2019	

== Friendly matches ==
Win Draw Loss

1 July 2018	Ismaily (Egypt)	2–1	(Egypt) Petrojet	Ismailia, Egypt
15:00 CAT (UTC+2)	Taro (??); Jaziri (??)	Report	?? (??)	Stadium: Ismailia Stadium

8 July 2018	Ismaily (Egypt)	3–1	(Egypt) Al Mokawloon Al Arab	Alexandria, Egypt
16:00 CAT (UTC+2)	Metwalli (??); Hashem (??); El Shamy (??)	Report	Ali (??)	Stadium: Tolip Stadium

13 July 2018	Ismaily (Egypt)	2–0	(Egypt) Tala'ea El Gaish	Alexandria, Egypt
16:00 CAT (UTC+2)	Jaziri (??); El Shamy (??)	Report		Stadium: Borg El Arab Stadium

15 July 2018	Haras El Hodoud (Egypt)	0–0	(Egypt) Ismaily	Alexandria, Egypt
16:00 CAT (UTC+2)		Report		Stadium: Haras El Hodoud Stadium

23 July 2018	Al Ahli (Qatar)	0–4	(Egypt) Ismaily	Salalah, Oman
10:00 GST (UTC+4)		Report	Hashem (??); Naguib (??); A. Magdy (??); Soliman (??)	Stadium: Al Saada Stadium

7 August 2018	Ismaily (Egypt)	2–2	(Oman) Dhofar	Ismailia, Egypt
16:00 CAT (UTC+2)	Abdel Azim (??); Abdel Hakim (??)	Report	?? (??); ?? (??)	Stadium: Ismailia Stadium

25 August 2018	Ismaily (Egypt)	0–2	(Egypt) Kahraba Ismailia	Ismailia, Egypt
16:00 CAT (UTC+2)		Report	?? (??); ?? (??)	Stadium: Ismailia Stadium

7 September 2018	Ismaily (Egypt)	3–3	(Libya) Al Ahli	Ismailia, Egypt
16:00 CAT (UTC+2)	Naguib (??); A. Magdy (??)	Report	?? (??); ?? (??); ?? (??)	Stadium: Ismailia Stadium

14 September 2018	Ismaily (Egypt)	8–0	(Egypt) MS Abou Souyer	Ismailia, Egypt
16:00 CAT (UTC+2)	Bambo (??); Naguib (??); Fathy (??); Abou Gouda (??); Abdel Hakim (??)	Report		Stadium: Ismailia Stadium

14 October 2018	Ismaily (Egypt)	10–0	(Egypt) Ras El Bar	Ismailia, Egypt
16:00 CAT (UTC+2)	Bambo (??); Taha (??); Afolabi (??); Metwalli (??); Fathy (??); Abou Gouda (??); Jaziri (??); Ayman (??); Naguib (??)	Report		Stadium: Ismailia Stadium

13 May 2019	Al Masry (Egypt)	1–1	(Egypt) Ismaily	Port Said, Egypt
22:00 CAT (UTC+2)	Nada 55'	Report	Morsy 90+4'	Stadium: Al Masry Club Stadium

=== Salalah Friendly Tournament ===
22 July 2018 Semi-final	CS Sfaxien (Tunisia)	1–1 (11–10 p)	(Egypt) Ismaily	Salalah, Oman
20:00 GST (UTC+4)	Sokari 16'	Report	Jaziri 42' (pen.)	Stadium: Al Saada Stadium
	Penalties
	Mathlouthi (penalty scored); Hnid (penalty scored); Sokari (penalty scored); Aka (penalty missed); Zouaghi (penalty scored); Harzi (penalty scored); Chaouat (penalty scored); Zamen (penalty missed); Trabelsi (penalty scored); Kouakou (penalty scored); Ben Hassen (penalty scored); Mathlouthi (penalty scored); Chaouat (penalty scored)		(penalty scored) Jaziri; (penalty scored) Metwalli; (penalty scored) A. Magdy; (penalty missed) Afolabi; (penalty scored) El Mohamady; (penalty scored) Abdel Hakim; (penalty scored) Hamdy; (penalty missed) El Hadary; (penalty scored) Abdel Azim; (penalty scored) Mendouga; (penalty scored) Hashem; (penalty scored) Jaziri; (penalty missed) Metwalli

25 July 2018 Third place play-off	Al Nasr (Oman)	0–3	(Egypt) Ismaily	Salalah, Oman
18:00 GST (UTC+4)		Report	Abd Rabo 29'; Bambo 67'; Metwalli 85'	Stadium: Al Saada Stadium

== Competitions ==
Win Draw Loss

=== Overview ===
Competition	First match	Last match	Starting round	Final position	Record							
Competition	First match	Last match	Starting round	Final position	Pld	W	D	L	GF	GA	GD	Win %
Egyptian Premier League	2 August 2018	24 July 2019	Matchday 1	7th	34	10	13	11	30	36	−6	29.41
Egypt Cup	8 October 2018	5 May 2019	Round of 32	Quarter-finals	3	2	0	1	6	3	+3	66.67
CAF Champions League	28 November 2018	16 March 2019	Preliminary round	Group stage (4th)	10	3	2	5	10	14	−4	30.00
Arab Club Champions Cup	12 August 2018	11 December 2018	First round	Second round	4	1	2	1	2	2	+0	25.00
Total					51	16	17	18	48	55	−7	31.37

Source: Competitions

=== Egyptian Premier League ===
==== League table ====
Pos	Team	Pld	W	D	L	GF	GA	GD	Pts
5	Al Mokawloon Al Arab	34	13	9	12	45	38	+7	48
6	Misr Lel Makkasa	34	12	10	12	34	36	−2	46
7	Ismaily	34	10	13	11	30	36	−6	43
8	Tala'ea El Gaish	34	10	11	13	41	39	+2	41
9	ENPPI	34	9	13	12	39	42	−3	40 (Note: Tied on head-to-head points (3), on head-to-head goal difference (0), on head-to-head goals scored (3) and on head-to-head away goals scored (2). Overall goal difference: ENPPI –3, Wadi Degla –6.)

Source: Soccerway
Rules for classification: 1) Points; 2) Head-to-Head points; 3) Head-to-Head goal difference; 4) Head-to-Head goals scored; 5) Head-to-Head away goals scored; 6) Goal difference; 7) Goals scored (Note: Head-to-head record is used only after all the matches between the teams in question have been played).

==== Results summary ====
Overall								Home						Away					
Pld	W	D	L	GF	GA	GD	Pts	W	D	L	GF	GA	GD	W	D	L	GF	GA	GD
34	10	13	11	30	36	−6	43	7	5	5	21	18	+3	3	8	6	9	18	−9

Source: Soccerway

==== Results by round ====
Round	1	2	3	4	5	6	7	8	9	10	11	12	13	14	15	16	17	18	19	20	21	22	23	24	25	26	27	28	29	30	31	32	33	34
Ground	A	H	A	H	A	H	A	H	A	H	H	H	H	A	H	A	H	H	A	H	A	H	A	H	A	H	A	A	A	A	H	A	H	A
Result	D	D	L	W	D	W	L	L	W	L	W	D	L	L	L	D	D	D	W	W	D	W	D	D	W	W	L	L	D	L	L	D	W	D
Position	5	12	14	9	8	8	9	11	14	14	11	11	12	14	15	18	18	18	17	11	11	8	8	8	9	9	7	7	7	7	7	7	7	7

Source: Soccerway
A = Away; H = Home; W = Win; D = Draw; L = Loss

==== Matches ====
2 August 2018 1	Al Ahly	1–1	Ismaily	Cairo
21:00 CAT (UTC+2)	Sherif 90+4'	Report	Jaziri 54'	Stadium: Al Salam Stadium; Referee: Gehad Grisha

6 August 2018 2	Ismaily	0–0	Petrojet	Ismailia
18:45 CAT (UTC+2)		Report		Stadium: Ismailia Stadium; Referee: Mohamed Abou Khater

17 August 2018 3	Al Ittihad	1–0	Ismaily	Alexandria
18:00 CAT (UTC+2)	Cissé 30'	Report		Stadium: Alexandria Stadium; Referee: Mahmoud Nagy

24 August 2018 4	Ismaily	1–0	Misr Lel Makkasa	Ismailia
18:15 CAT (UTC+2)	Baffour 30'	Report		Stadium: Ismailia Stadium; Referee: Mahmoud El Banna

31 August 2018 5	Nogoom	1–1	Ismaily	Cairo
18:00 CAT (UTC+2)	Abdel Halim 54' (pen.)	Report	A. Magdy 19'	Stadium: Petro Sport Stadium; Referee: Ahmed El Ghandour

13 September 2018 6	Ismaily	3–2	ENPPI	Ismailia
18:00 CAT (UTC+2)	Mendouga 11', 60'; Baffour 45'	Report	Roaa 24'; Kaoud 45+4'	Stadium: Ismailia Stadium; Referee: Mohamed El Sabahy

18 September 2018 7	Tala'ea El Gaish	3–0	Ismaily	Cairo
15:30 CAT (UTC+2)	Kabouria 45+3'; N'Diaye 59'; Tarek 90+2'	Report		Stadium: Gehaz El Reyada Stadium; Referee: Mahmoud El Banna

22 September 2018 8	Ismaily	1–3	Smouha	Ismailia
18:00 CAT (UTC+2)	Jaziri 13'	Report	Taha 22' (o.g.); Shilongo 39'; Farid 69'	Stadium: Ismailia Stadium; Referee: Mohamed Maarouf

19 October 2018 11	Ismaily	2–0	Pyramids	Ismailia
18:00 CAT (UTC+2)	Metwalli 6'; Jaziri 69' (pen.)	Report		Stadium: Ismailia Stadium; Referee: Mohamed El Hanafy

3 November 2018 12	Ismaily	0–0	Al Masry	Ismailia
17:00 CAT (UTC+2)		Report		Stadium: Ismailia Stadium; Referee: Amin Omar

7 November 2018 13	Ismaily	1–3	Wadi Degla	Ismailia
19:30 CAT (UTC+2)	Mendouga 42'	Report	Reda 3'; El Gabbas 82' (pen.); Mamdouh 85'	Stadium: Ismailia Stadium; Referee: Ibrahim Nour El Din

11 November 2018 14	Haras El Hodoud	1–0	Ismaily	Alexandria
14:45 CAT (UTC+2)	Moses 34'	Report		Stadium: Haras El Hodoud Stadium; Referee: Mohamed El Sabahy

21 November 2018 15	Ismaily	1–2	El Entag El Harby	Ismailia
20:00 CAT (UTC+2)	Taha 45+3' (pen.)	Report	Mosaad 36'; Diawara 40'	Stadium: Ismailia Stadium; Referee: Mohamed Maarouf

2 January 2019 (Note: Al Mokawloon Al Arab v Ismaily match, originally scheduled to be played on 1 October 2018, was postponed due to security concerns. The match was later rescheduled to be played on 2 January 2019.) 9	Al Mokawloon Al Arab	1–2	Ismaily	Cairo
18:00 CAT (UTC+2)	El Shimi 18'	Report	Adel 56' (o.g.); Shilongo 79'	Stadium: Osman Ahmed Osman Stadium; Referee: Tarek Magdy

5 January 2019 (Note: El Dakhleya v Ismaily match, originally scheduled to be played on 27 November 2018, was postponed due to conflicting with Le Messager Ngozi v Ismaily match in the CAF Champions League, which was set to be played on 28 November 2018. The match was later rescheduled to be played on 5 January 2019.) 16	El Dakhleya	0–0	Ismaily	Cairo
14:30 CAT (UTC+2)		Report		Stadium: Police Academy Stadium; Referee: Mahmoud Nagy

24 January 2019 (Note: Petrojet v Ismaily match, originally scheduled to be played on 13 January 2019, was postponed due to conflicting with TP Mazembe v Ismaily match in the CAF Champions League, which was set to be played on 12 January 2018. The match was later rescheduled to be played on 24 January 2019.) 19	Petrojet	0–1	Ismaily	Cairo (Note: Petrojet v Ismaily match was played at Gehaz El Reyada Stadium in Cairo instead of the Egyptian Army Stadium in Suez due to security concerns.)
14:30 CAT (UTC+2)		Report	Shilongo 7'	Stadium: Gehaz El Reyada Stadium; Referee: Mohamed El Sabahy

28 January 2019 20	Ismaily	2–0	Al Ittihad	Ismailia
17:00 CAT (UTC+2)	Bambo 38'; Abdel Hakim 90+2'	Report		Stadium: Ismailia Stadium; Referee: Gehad Grisha

7 February 2019 21	Misr Lel Makkasa	0–0	Ismaily	Cairo (Note: Misr Lel Makkasa v Ismaily match was played at Osman Ahmed Osman Stadium in Cairo instead of Faiyum Stadium in Faiyum due to pitch status.)
19:00 CAT (UTC+2)		Report		Stadium: Osman Ahmed Osman Stadium; Referee: Tarek Magdy

16 February 2019 22	Ismaily	3–2	Nogoom	Cairo (Note: Ismaily v Nogoom match was played at Gehaz El Reyada Stadium in Cairo instead of Ismailia Stadium in Ismailia due to maintenance.)
16:00 CAT (UTC+2)	Bambo 45+2', 81'; Metwalli 55'	Report	Amin 63', 90+3'	Stadium: Gehaz El Reyada Stadium; Referee: Ahmed Hamdy

26 February 2019 24	Ismaily	0–0	Tala'ea El Gaish	Alexandria (Note: Ismaily v Tala'ea El Gaish match was played at Borg El Arab Stadium in Alexandria instead of Ismailia Stadium in Ismailia due to maintenance.)
15:00 CAT (UTC+2)		Report		Stadium: Borg El Arab Stadium; Referee: Mohamed El Hanafy

12 March 2019 (Note: Smouha v Ismaily match, originally scheduled to be played on 1 March 2019, was postponed due to conflicting with CS Constantine v Ismaily match in the CAF Champions League, which was set to be played on 2 March 2019. The match was later rescheduled to be played on 12 March 2019.) 25	Smouha	0–1	Ismaily	Alexandria
17:30 CAT (UTC+2)		Report	Baffour 31'	Stadium: Borg El Arab Stadium; Referee: Mahmoud Ashour

29 March 2019 (Note: ENPPI v Ismaily match, originally scheduled to be played on 21 February 2019, was postponed due to conflicting with Ismaily v CS Constantine match in the CAF Champions League, which was set to be played on 23 February 2019. The match was later rescheduled to be played on 29 March 2019.) 23	ENPPI	0–0	Ismaily	Cairo
19:00 CAT (UTC+2)		Report		Stadium: Petro Sport Stadium; Referee: Mohamed Maarouf

2 April 2019 (Note: Ismaily v Al Mokawloon Al Arab match, originally scheduled to be played on 9 March 2019, was postponed due to conflicting with Ismaily v TP Mazembe match in the CAF Champions League, which was set to be played on 8 March 2019. The match was later rescheduled to be played on 2 April 2019.) 26	Ismaily	2–0	Al Mokawloon Al Arab	Suez (Note: Ismaily v Al Mokawloon Al Arab match was played at the Egyptian Army Stadium in Suez instead of Ismailia Stadium in Ismailia due to maintenance.)
17:00 CAT (UTC+2)	Bambo 4'; Dunga 48'	Report		Stadium: Egyptian Army Stadium; Referee: Mahmoud El Banna

6 April 2019 28	Pyramids	3–1	Ismaily	Cairo
20:00 CAT (UTC+2)	Benavente 14', 63'; Kharbin 19' (pen.)	Report	Metwalli 39' (pen.)	Stadium: 30 June Stadium; Referee: Mario Zebec (Croatia)

10 April 2019 (Note: Ismaily v El Gouna match, originally scheduled to be played on 13 December 2018, was postponed due to conflicting with Raja Casablanca v Ismaily match in the Arab Club Champions Cup, which was set to be played on 11 December 2018. The match was later rescheduled to be played on 10 April 2019.) 17	Ismaily	2–2	El Gouna	Suez (Note: Ismaily v El Gouna match was played at the Egyptian Army Stadium in Suez instead of Ismailia Stadium in Ismailia due to maintenance.)
17:30 CAT (UTC+2)	Shilongo 45'; Metwalli 58' (pen.)	Report	Mekky 15', 90+4'	Stadium: Egyptian Army Stadium; Referee: Ibrahim Nour El Din

14 April 2019 29	Al Masry	1–1	Ismaily	Cairo (Note: Al Masry v Ismaily match was played at 30 June Stadium in Cairo instead of Al Masry Club Stadium in Port Said due to security concerns.)
17:30 CAT (UTC+2)	Amutu 47'	Report	Metwalli 61'	Stadium: 30 June Stadium; Referee: Amin Omar

18 April 2019 (Note: Ismaily v Zamalek match, originally scheduled to be played on 6 October 2018, was postponed due to conflicting with Al Hilal v Zamalek match in the Saudi-Egyptian Super Cup, which was set to be played on the same day. The match was later rescheduled to be played on 18 April 2019.) 10	Ismaily	0–2	Zamalek	Suez (Note: Ismaily v Zamalek match was played at the Egyptian Army Stadium in Suez instead of Ismailia Stadium in Ismailia due to maintenance.)
17:00 CAT (UTC+2)		Report	El Said 36'; Obama 47'	Stadium: Egyptian Army Stadium; Referee: Novak Simović (Serbia)

25 April 2019 30	Wadi Degla	3–0	Ismaily	Cairo
17:00 CAT (UTC+2)	Arafat 14', 24'; Ndiaye 65'	Report		Stadium: Petro Sport Stadium; Referee: Mohamed El Hanafy

30 April 2019 31	Ismaily	0–1	Haras El Hodoud	Cairo (Note: Ismaily v Haras El Hodoud match was played at Gehaz El Reyada Stadium in Cairo instead of Ismailia Stadium in Ismailia due to maintenance.)
17:30 CAT (UTC+2)		Report	Moses 28'	Stadium: Gehaz El Reyada Stadium; Referee: Mohamed Maarouf

10 May 2019 32	El Entag El Harby	0–0	Ismaily	Cairo
22:00 CAT (UTC+2)		Report		Stadium: Police Academy Stadium (Note: El Entag El Harby v Ismaily match was played at Police Academy Stadium instead of Al Salam Stadium due to maintenance.); Referee: Gehad Grisha

17 May 2019 (Note: Ismaily v El Dakhleya match, originally scheduled to be played on 21 May 2019, was played on 17 May 2019 to avoid scheduling conflicts.) 33	Ismaily	2–0	El Dakhleya	Suez (Note: Ismaily v El Dakhleya match was played at the Egyptian Army Stadium in Suez instead of Ismailia Stadium in Ismailia due to maintenance.)
22:00 CAT (UTC+2)	Bambo 29'; Metwalli 50' (pen.)	Report		Stadium: Egyptian Army Stadium; Referee: Tarek Magdy

22 May 2019 (Note: Ismaily v Al Ahly match, originally scheduled to be played on 23 December 2018, was postponed due to conflicting with Coton Sport v Ismaily match in the CAF Champions League and with Jimma Aba Jifar vs Al Ahly match in the CAF Champions League, which were set to be played on 22 and 23 December 2018 respectively. The match was later rescheduled to be played on 22 May 2019.) 18	Ismaily	1–1	Al Ahly	Alexandria (Note: Ismaily v Al Ahly match was played at Borg El Arab Stadium in Alexandria instead of Ismailia Stadium in Ismailia due to maintenance.)
22:00 CAT (UTC+2)	Bambo 84'	Report	Azaro 73'	Stadium: Borg El Arab Stadium; Referee: Mohamed Maarouf

27 May 2019 34	El Gouna	0–0	Ismaily	El Gouna
22:00 CAT (UTC+2)		Report		Stadium: El Gouna Stadium; Referee: Marius Avram (Romania)

24 July 2019 (Note: Zamalek v Ismaily match, originally scheduled to be played on 1 April 2019, was postponed due to security concerns. The match was later rescheduled to be played on 24 July 2019.) 27	Zamalek	3–1	Ismaily	Cairo
20:00 CAT (UTC+2)	Alaa 14' (pen.); Sayed 47'; El Said 59'	Report	Shilongo 37'	Stadium: Petro Sport Stadium; Referee: Ibrahim Nour El Din

=== Egypt Cup ===
8 October 2018 Round of 32	Ismaily	4–0	Naser El Fekreia	Ismailia
18:00 CAT (UTC+2)	A. Magdy 36'; El Wahsh 41'; M. Magdy I 49'; Naguib 75'	Report		Stadium: Ismailia Stadium; Referee: Mohamed El Tabei

23 October 2018 Round of 16	Ismaily	1–0	Al Mokawloon Al Arab	Cairo (Note: Starting from round of 16, all matches were played on stadiums selected by the Egyptian Football Association.)
15:00 CAT (UTC+2)	Bambo 82'	Report		Stadium: Al Salam Stadium; Referee: Mohamed Adel

5 May 2019 (Note: Ismaily v Al Ittihad match, originally scheduled to be played on 2 April 2019, was postponed due to security concerns. The match was later rescheduled to be played on 5 May 2019.) Quarter-finals	Ismaily	1–3 (a.e.t.)	Al Ittihad	Cairo
17:00 CAT (UTC+2)	Bambo 81'	Report	Cissé 84'; Anwar 103'; Kamar 108'	Stadium: Osman Ahmed Osman Stadium; Referee: Ahmed El Ghandour

=== CAF Champions League ===
==== Premilinary round ====
28 November 2018 First leg	Le Messager Ngozi (Burundi)	0–1	(Egypt) Ismaily	Ngozi, Burundi
15:00 CAT (UTC+2)		Report	Taha 56'	Stadium: Stade Urukundo; Referee: Sabry Mohamed Fadul (Sudan)

5 December 2018 Second leg	Ismaily (Egypt)	2–1 (3–1 agg.)	(Burundi) Le Messager Ngozi	Ismailia, Egypt
17:00 CAT (UTC+2)	Hamdy 33'; A. Magdy 64'	Report	Urasenga 43' (pen.)	Stadium: Ismailia Stadium; Referee: Abdul Wahid Huraywidah (Libya)

==== First round ====
16 December 2018 First leg	Ismaily (Egypt)	2–0	(Cameroon) Coton Sport	Ismailia, Egypt
17:00 CAT (UTC+2)	El Mohamady 45+2'; Bambo 59'	Report		Stadium: Ismailia Stadium; Referee: Noureddine El Jaafari (Morocco)

22 December 2018 Second leg	Coton Sport (Cameroon)	2–1 (2–3 agg.)	(Egypt) Ismaily	Yaoundé, Cameroon
15:30 EAT (UTC+1)	Ndassi 44'; Daouda 66' (pen.)	Report	El Mohamady 4' (pen.)	Stadium: Stade Militaire; Referee: Maudo Jallow (Gambia)

==== Group C ====
Pos	Team	Pld	W	D	L	GF	GA	GD	Pts	Qualification
1	(Democratic Republic of the Congo) TP Mazembe	6	3	2	1	13	4	+9	11	Quarter-finals
2	(Algeria) CS Constantine	6	3	1	2	8	6	+2	10 (Note: Goal difference in all group matches: CS Constantine +2, Club Africain –4.)	Quarter-finals
3	(Tunisia) Club Africain	6	3	1	2	5	9	−4	10	
4	(Egypt) Ismaily (Note: The CAF announced on 23 January 2019 that Ismaily were disqualified for aggressive fans behaviors, including consistently throwing rocks and water bottles on the assistant referee and the away fans, and other incidents at their home match against Club Africain on 18 January 2019. All results of matches played by Ismaily were annulled and not taken into consideration according to the regulations. However, following an appeal by Ismaily, the CAF decided on 10 February 2019 to reinstate Ismaily to the competition.)	6	0	2	4	4	11	−7	2	

Source: CAF
Rules for classification: Group stage tiebreakers
Notes:

12 January 2019 1	TP Mazembe (Democratic Republic of the Congo)	2–0	(Egypt) Ismaily	Lubumbashi, DR Congo
15:00 CAT (UTC+2)	Ushindi 83'; Mondeko 86'	Report		Stadium: Stade TP Mazembe; Referee: Redouane Jiyed (Morocco)

18 January 2019 2	Ismaily (Egypt)	0–3 (Awarded)	(Tunisia) Club Africain	Ismailia, Egypt
18:00 CAT (UTC+2)	Shilongo 8'	Report	Ayadi 40' (pen.), 45' (pen.)	Stadium: Ismailia Stadium; Referee: Sidi Alioum (Cameroon)
Note: On 19 February 2019, the CAF decided to consider the match forfeited by Ismaily with a result of 3–0 in favour of Club Africain. The match was originally suspended on the 83rd minute due to aggressive fans behaviors with Club Africain leading 2–1.

23 February 2019 (Note: CS Constantine v Ismaily match, originally scheduled to be played on 1 February 2019, was rescheduled to be played on 23 February 2019 after the reinstatement of Ismaily.) 3	Ismaily (Egypt)	1–1	(Algeria) CS Constantine	Alexandria, Egypt (Note: Ismaily v CS Constantine match was played at Borg El Arab Stadium in Alexandria instead of Ismailia Stadium in Ismailia due to maintenance.)
18:00 CAT (UTC+2)	Shilongo 69'	Report	Hamdy 90+4' (o.g.)	Stadium: Borg El Arab Stadium; Attendance: 0 (Note: Ismaily v CS Constantine match was played behind closed doors due to crowd trouble during the Ismaily v Club Africain match.); Referee: Bakary Gassama (Gambia)

2 March 2019 (Note: Ismaily v CS Constantine match, originally scheduled to be played on 12 February 2019, was rescheduled to be played on 2 March 2019 after the reinstatement of Ismaily.) 4	CS Constantine (Algeria)	3–2	(Egypt) Ismaily	Constantine, Algeria
17:00 WAT (UTC+1)	Zaâlani 45+2'; Yettou 67'; Bahamboula 81'	Report	Hamdy 13'; Shilongo 50'	Stadium: Mohamed Hamlaoui Stadium; Referee: El Fadil Mohamed (Sudan)

8 March 2019 5	Ismaily (Egypt)	1–1	(Democratic Republic of the Congo) TP Mazembe	Alexandria, Egypt (Note: Ismaily v TP Mazembe match was played at Borg El Arab Stadium in Alexandria instead of Ismailia Stadium in Ismailia due to maintenance.)
18:00 CAT (UTC+2)	A. Magdy 55'	Report	Elia 40'	Stadium: Borg El Arab Stadium; Attendance: 0 (Note: Ismaily v TP Mazembe match was played behind closed doors due to crowd trouble during the Ismaily v Club Africain match.); Referee: Maguette N'Diaye (Senegal)

16 March 2019 6	Club Africain (Tunisia)	1–0	(Egypt) Ismaily	Radès, Tunisia
14:00 WAT (UTC+1)	Ayadi 75' (pen.)	Report		Stadium: Stade Olympique de Radès; Referee: El Fadil Mohamed (Sudan)

=== Arab Club Champions Cup ===
==== First round ====
12 August 2018 First leg	Ismaily (Egypt)	2–0	Al Kuwait	Ismailia, Egypt
19:30 CAT (UTC+2)	El Shamy 34'; Mendouga 54'	Report		Stadium: Ismailia Stadium; Referee: Redouane Jiyed (Morocco)

27 September 2018 Second leg	Al Kuwait	2–0 (2–2 agg.) (2–4 p)	(Egypt) Ismaily	Kuwait City, Kuwait
19:30 AST (UTC+3)	Saeed 22'; Al Hajri 70'	Report		Stadium: Al Kuwait Sports Club Stadium; Referee: Mohanad Qassim (Iraq)
	Penalties
	Lahmar (penalty missed); Fatau (penalty scored); Al Fadhel (penalty scored); Al Shereedah (penalty missed)		(penalty scored) Abd Rabo; (penalty scored) Taha; (penalty scored) Naguib; (penalty scored) Baffour

==== Second round ====
29 October 2018 First leg	Ismaily (Egypt)	0–0	(Morocco) Raja Casablanca	Ismailia, Egypt
19:00 CAT (UTC+2)		Report		Stadium: Ismailia Stadium; Referee: Ali Shaban (Kuwait)

11 December 2018 Second leg	Raja Casablanca (Morocco)	0–0 (0–0 agg.) (4–2 p)	(Egypt) Ismaily	Casablanca, Morocco
20:00 WAT (UTC+1)		Report		Stadium: Stade Mohammed V Referee: Ahmed Al Kaf (Oman)
	Penalties
	Hafidi (penalty missed); Banoun (penalty scored); Rahimi (penalty scored); Achchakir (penalty scored); Hadraf (penalty scored)		(penalty missed) Abd Rabo; (penalty missed) Taha; (penalty scored) El Wahsh; (penalty scored) El Mohamady

== Statistics ==
=== Appearances and goals ===
No.	Pos	Player	Egyptian Premier League		Egypt Cup		CAF Champions League		Arab Club Champions Cup		Total	
No.	Pos	Player	Apps	Goals	Apps	Goals	Apps	Goals	Apps	Goals	Apps	Goals
2	DF	(Egypt) Baher El Mohamady	29	0	1	0	7	2	4	0	41	2
3	DF	(Egypt) Mohamed Magdy I	20	0	2	1	7	0	2+1	0	32	1
4	MF	(Egypt) Emad Hamdy	19+2	0	3	0	9	2	4	0	37	2
5	DF	(Ghana) Richard Baffour	12+1	3	1	0	4+1	0	2	0	21	3
9	FW	(Egypt) Mohamed El Shamy	10+8	0	1	0	0+2	0	2	1	23	1
10	FW	(Egypt) Karim Bambo	14+13	6	0+2	2	3+6	1	0+2	0	40	9
11	DF	(Egypt) Tarek Taha	26+1	1	3	0	9	1	3+1	0	43	2
13	DF	(Egypt) Alaa Abdel Azim	2+1	0	0	0	0	0	1	0	4	0
14	DF	(Egypt) Mahmoud Metwalli	20+2	6	3	0	5	0	4	0	34	6
15	MF	(Egypt) Ahmed Ali	1+1	0	0	0	0	0	0	0	2	0
16	GK	(Egypt) Mohamed Magdy II	2	0	0	0	2	0	0	0	4	0
17	FW	(Nigeria) Odah Marshall	4+5	0	0	0	2+3	0	0	0	14	0
20	MF	(Egypt) Ibrahim Abdel Khalek	3+4	0	0+1	0	2+1	0	0	0	11	0
21	DF	(Egypt) Selim Abdel Khalek	0	0	0	0	0	0	0	0	0	0
22	MF	(Egypt) Nader Ramadan	9+1	0	1+1	0	3	0	2	0	17	0
26	GK	(Egypt) Mohamed Fawzy	19	0	1	0	8	0	1	0	29	0
27	FW	(Namibia) Benson Shilongo	17+3	4	1	0	4+2	2	0	0	27	6
28	MF	(Egypt) Mahmoud Abdel Aati	16	1	1	0	4+1	0	0	0	22	1
29	DF	(Egypt) Mohamed Hashem	9+1	0	1	0	1+3	0	1+1	0	17	0
30	DF	(Egypt) Osama Ibrahim	11+1	0	1	0	3+1	0	0	0	17	0
31	FW	(Egypt) Wagih Abdel Hakim	4+13	1	0	0	2+2	0	0	0	21	1
32	FW	(Egypt) Abdel Rahman Magdy	23+4	1	3	1	9+1	2	2+1	0	43	4
33	MF	(Egypt) Mohamed Sadek	25+4	0	0+1	0	7+2	0	0+3	0	42	0
34	DF	(Egypt) Ahmed Ayman	15+1	0	1	0	4	0	0	0	21	0
35	MF	(Egypt) Mohamed El Darf	3+7	0	0	0	2	0	0	0	12	0
36	MF	(Egypt) Medhat Faqousa	1+2	0	0	0	0	0	0	0	3	0
38	FW	(Egypt) Mahmoud Abou Gouda	0+1	0	0	0	0	0	0	0	1	0
39	FW	(Tanzania) Yahya Zayd	1+2	0	0+1	0	0	0	0	0	4	0
41	MF	(Egypt) Mohamed Bayoumi	1+2	0	0	0	0	0	0	0	3	0
42	MF	(Egypt) Mostafa Fares	2+1	0	0	0	0	0	0	0	3	0
43	FW	(Egypt) Hazem Morsy	0+2	0	0	0	0	0	0	0	2	0
Players transferred out during the season
1	GK	(Egypt) Essam El Hadary	13	0	2	0	0	0	3	0	18	0
7	FW	(Cameroon) Christopher Mendouga	13+1	3	2	0	4	0	3	1	23	4
8	MF	(Egypt) Omar El Wahsh	5+4	0	1	1	2	0	1+1	0	14	1
12	MF	(Egypt) Hosny Abd Rabo	11+3	0	2	0	2+1	0	4	0	23	0
17	MF	(Egypt) Omar Fathy	0+2	0	0+1	0	0	0	0	0	3	0
18	FW	(Tunisia) Lassaâd Jaziri	7+1	3	2	0	4	0	4	0	18	3
23	FW	(Nigeria) Okiki Afolabi	2+3	0	0+1	0	0	0	0	0	6	0
24	FW	(Egypt) Shoukry Naguib	4+5	0	0+1	1	1+3	0	1+2	0	17	1
38	FW	(Egypt) Walid Attia	0	0	0	0	0	0	0	0	0	0

=== Goalscorers ===
Rank	Position	Name	Egyptian Premier League	Egypt Cup	CAF Champions League	Arab Club Champions Cup	Total
1	FW	(Egypt) Karim Bambo	6	2	1	0	9
2	DF	(Egypt) Mahmoud Metwalli	6	0	0	0	6
2	FW	(Namibia) Benson Shilongo	4	0	2	0	6
4	FW	(Egypt) Abdel Rahman Magdy	1	1	2	0	4
4	FW	(Cameroon) Christopher Mendouga	3	0	0	1	4
6	DF	(Ghana) Richard Baffour	3	0	0	0	3
6	FW	(Tunisia) Lassaâd Jaziri	3	0	0	0	3
8	MF	(Egypt) Emad Hamdy	0	0	2	0	2
8	DF	(Egypt) Baher El Mohamady	0	0	2	0	2
8	DF	(Egypt) Tarek Taha	1	0	1	0	2
11	MF	(Egypt) Mahmoud Abdel Aati	1	0	0	0	1
11	FW	(Egypt) Wagih Abdel Hakim	1	0	0	0	1
11	DF	(Egypt) Mohamed Magdy I	0	1	0	0	1
11	FW	(Egypt) Shoukry Naguib	0	1	0	0	1
11	FW	(Egypt) Mohamed El Shamy	0	0	0	1	1
11	MF	(Egypt) Omar El Wahsh	0	1	0	0	1
Own goal			1	0	0	0	1
Total			30	6	10	2	48

=== Clean sheets ===
Rank	Name	Egyptian Premier League	Egypt Cup	CAF Champions League	Arab Club Champions Cup	Total
1	(Egypt) Mohamed Fawzy	10	0	2	1	13
2	(Egypt) Essam El Hadary	4	2	0	2	8
3	(Egypt) Mohamed Magdy II	1	0	0	0	1
Total		15	2	2	3	22
