= 2018 Egypt Cup final =

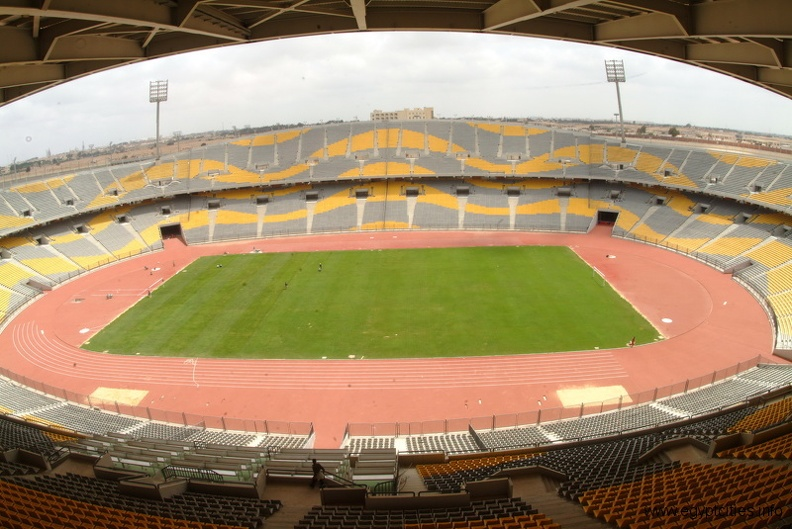
- Borg El Arab Stadium hosted the final
- Event: 2017–18 Egypt Cup
Smouha	Zamalek
1	1
- After extra time, Zamalek won 5–4 on penalties
- Date: 15 May 2018
- Venue: Borg El Arab Stadium, Alexandria
- Referee: Mohamed Farouk
- Weather: Clear; 21 °C (70 °F); 78% humidity

The 2018 Egypt Cup final was the final match of the 2017–18 Egypt Cup and the 86th final of the Egypt Cup, Africa's oldest football cup competition. It was held at Borg El Arab Stadium in Alexandria, Egypt. It was played on 15 May 2018 between Smouha and Zamalek. It was a repeat of the 2014 final, which Zamalek won 1–0. Zamalek won the rematch 5–4 on penalties following a 1–1 tie after extra time, so qualified for the 2018–19 CAF Confederation Cup. They also earned a shot at 2017–18 Egyptian Premier League champions Al Ahly for the 2018 Egyptian Super Cup.

== Smouha's route ==
In all results below, the score of the finalist is given first.

Round	Opposition	Score
R32	Olympic Club	2–1
R16	Petrojet	2–1
QF	Wadi Degla	0–0 (a.e.t.) (3–1 p)
SF	Al Assiouty Sport	1–1 (a.e.t.) (4–3 p)

Smouha as an Egyptian Premier League team entered in the round of 32 of the Egypt Cup against Egyptian Second Division club Olympic Club on 10 November 2017 at Haras El Hodoud Stadium and won 2–1, with goals from Yasser Ibrahim in the 20th minute, an equalizer from Osama Marey in the 80th minute and the winner from Abdel Aziz Emam in the stoppage time. In the round of 16, they met fellow Premier League opposition Petrojet on 8 December 2017 at Al Salam Stadium, and won 2–1 with goals from Tarek Taha in the 29th minute, an equalizer from Mostafa Shebeita 4 minutes later and the winner from Hossam Hassan in the 43rd minute. In the quarter-finals, they played against Wadi Degla on 1 May 2018 at Al Salam Stadium. There was no real chances in the match for both teams, except one powerful shot from Oumed Oukri in the 96th minute that almost sent Smouha straight to semi-finals, but El Sayed Salem managed to clear the ball from the goal line. The match ended 0–0 after extra time, and Smouha won 3–1 on penalties. In the semi-finals, Smouha faced Al Assiouty Sport on 8 May 2018 at Borg El Arab Stadium. Smouha played against their future new manager Ali Maher, who signed a contract with the club to lead the team after the 2017–18 season ends. Smouha won the match 4–3 on penalties after the match ended 1–1 after extra time. Ahmed Temsah scored the opener for Smouha in the 72nd minute before Benson Shilongo took the game to extra time after tying up the match by scoring a penalty in the stoppage time. Smouha are seeking their first ever Egypt Cup triumph.

== Match details ==
15 May 2018
19:00 CAT

Smouha	1–1 (a.e.t.)	Zamalek
Hassan 5'	Report	Kasongo 86'
Penalties
Bakry (penalty missed); Moaz (penalty scored); Y. Ibrahim (penalty scored); Saleh (penalty scored); Farid (penalty scored)	4–5	(penalty scored) Alaa; (penalty scored) Hamed; (penalty scored) Gomaa; (penalty scored) Nagguez; (penalty scored) Obama

Borg El Arab Stadium, Alexandria
Referee: Mohamed Farouk

Smouha	Zamalek

GK	1	(Egypt) El Mahdy Soliman	(yellow card) 85'
CB	3	(Egypt) Abdallah Bakry
CB	23	(Egypt) Yasser Ibrahim
RB	30	(Egypt) Ragab Bakar	(yellow card) 90+3'
LB	2	(Egypt) Mahmoud Moaz
CM	14	(Egypt) Ahmed Homos (c)
CM	24	(Egypt) Islam Saleh
AM	11	(Egypt) Mohamed Hamdy		(substituted off) 38'
AM	33	(Egypt) Nasser Maher	(yellow card) 41'	(substituted off) 110'
CF	18	(Egypt) Hossam Hassan	(yellow card) 6' (yellow-red card) 69'
CF	15	(Ethiopia) Oumed Oukri		(substituted off) 80'
Substitutes:
GK	16	(Egypt) Ahmed Yehia
DF	4	(Egypt) Osama Ibrahim
DF	5	(Egypt) El Sayed Farid		(substituted on) 80'
DF	26	(Egypt) Tarek Taha
MF	7	(Egypt) Mahmoud Sayed
MF	35	(Egypt) Ibrahim Abdel Kawi		(substituted on) 38'
FW	19	(Egypt) Ahmed Temsah		(substituted on) 110'
Manager:
(Egypt) Mimi Abdel Razek

GK	16	(Egypt) Mahmoud Genesh (c)
CB	24	(Egypt) Mahmoud Alaa	(yellow card) 57'
CB	28	(Egypt) Mahmoud Hamdy
RB	12	(Tunisia) Hamdi Nagguez
LB	33	(Egypt) Ahmed Fatouh
CM	3	(Egypt) Tarek Hamed	(yellow card) 81'
AM	27	(Egypt) Mahmoud Abdel Aziz		(substituted off) 73'
AM	18	(Egypt) Mohamed Antar		(substituted off) 67'
RW	10	(Egypt) Youssef Obama
LW	19	(Egypt) Emad Fathy		(substituted off) 52'
CF	23	(Democratic Republic of the Congo) Kabongo Kasongo	(yellow card) 115'
Substitutes:
GK	31	(Egypt) Omar Salah
DF	2	(Egypt) Mohamed Magdy
MF	4	(Egypt) Ahmed Tawfik
MF	6	(Egypt) Mahmoud Abdel Aati
MF	14	(Egypt) Ayman Hefny		(substituted on) 52'
MF	22	(Egypt) Abdallah Gomaa		(substituted on) 67'
FW	17	(Egypt) Basem Morsy		(substituted on) 73'
Manager:
(Egypt) Khaled Galal

Assistant referees:
Ayman Degeish
Mahmoud Abou El Regal
Fourth official:
Mohamed Maarouf
Fifth officials:
Mohamed El Sabahy
Tarek Samy

Match rules

- 90 minutes.
- 30 minutes of extra time if necessary.
- Penalty shoot-out if scores still level.
- Seven named substitutes.
- Maximum of three substitutions.
