= 2019 Egyptian Super Cup =

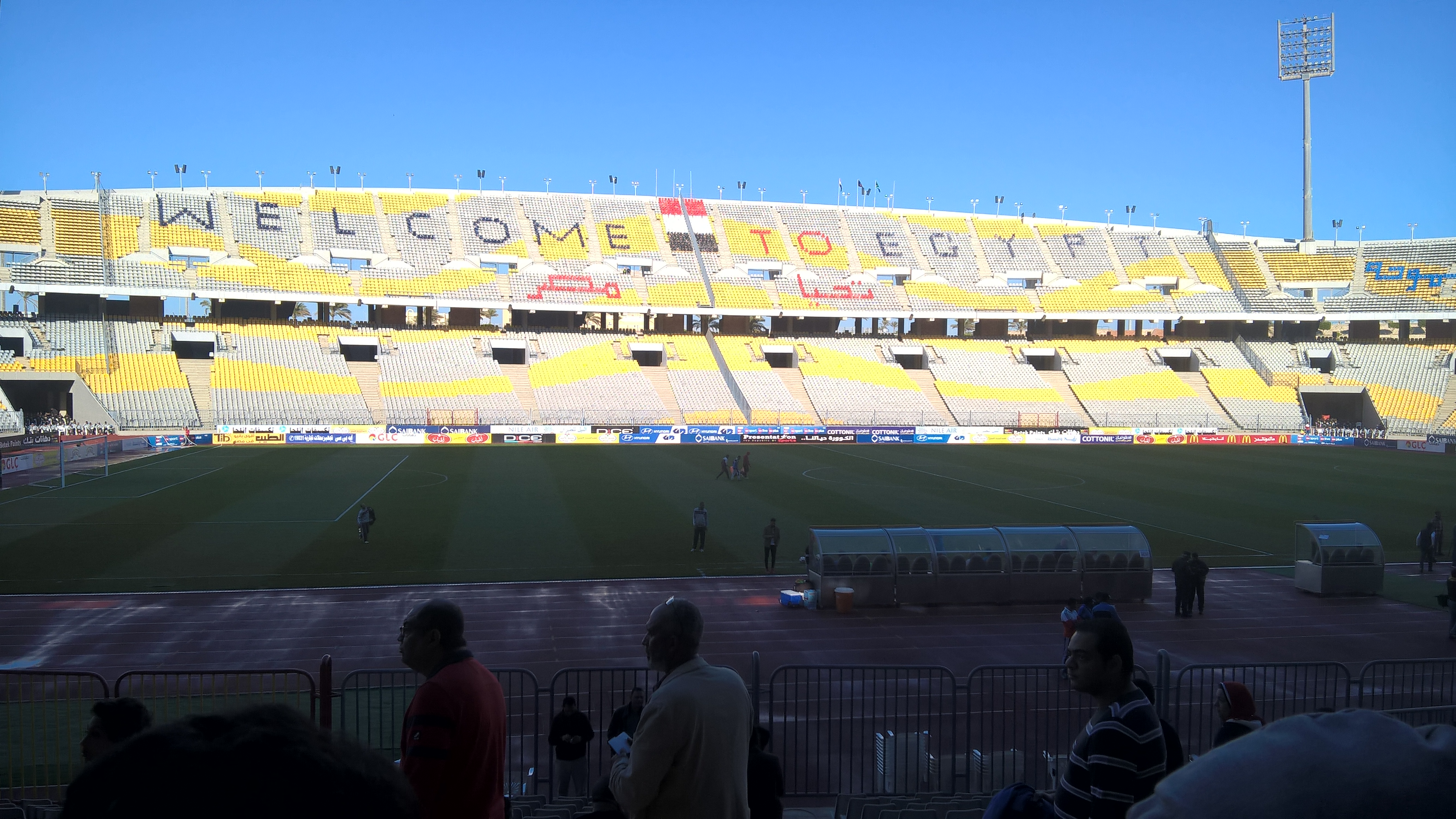
- Borg El Arab Stadium hosted the match
Al Ahly	Zamalek
3	2
- Date: 20 September 2019
- Venue: Borg El Arab Stadium, Alexandria
- Man of the Match: Junior Ajayi (Al Ahly)
- Referee: Felix Brych (Germany)
- Attendance: 15,000
- Weather: Partly cloudy 24 °C (75 °F); 69% humidity

The 2019 Egyptian Super Cup (also known as the 2017–18 SAIB Egyptian Super Cup for sponsorship reasons) was the 16th Egyptian Super Cup, an annual football match played between the winners of the previous season's Egyptian Premier League and Egypt Cup. It was played at Borg El Arab Stadium in Alexandria, Egypt, on 20 September 2019, contested by Al Ahly and Zamalek. Al Ahly defended the trophy they won in the previous edition and defeated Zamalek 3–2, winning their record-extending 11th trophy.

== Background ==
In the 2017–18 Egyptian Premier League, Al Ahly and Ismaily were the only two teams in the league's title race, with the latter finishing the first half of the season on top. However, after Frenchman coach Sébastien Desabre left Ismaily mid-season to join the Ugandan national team as their manager, the club started to fall apart and went from being on top with a difference of 4 points to finishing the league behind Al Ahly with 68 points; 20 points less than the champions. Al Ahly officially won their record-extending fortieth Egyptian Premier League title on 12 March 2018 with 6 games to spare. The team broke numerous league records over the course of the season, including most points with 88 points, most wins with 28 wins and most goals scored in a single season with 75 goals. Al Ahly's Moroccan forward Walid Azaro also finished the league as the top goalscorer with 18 goals.

Zamalek won the 2017–18 Egypt Cup after defeating Smouha 5–4 on penalties in the final after the match ended 1–1 at extra time, winning their 4th Egypt Cup title in the previous 5 editions of the competition. Both teams' way to the final was considered "too easy" by the media, especially for Zamalek who faced 2017–18 Egyptian Second Division sides El Minya and Haras El Hodoud in the round of 32 and round of 16 respectively. The Egyptian Football Association were also heavily criticized for changes they made to the competition, mainly for the changes made to the draw where they made sure that the cup defending champions can only face the previous league winners in the final.

During the 2017–18 season, both teams met each other in the league two times. Al Ahly won the first encounter 3–0 on 8 January 2018 at Cairo International Stadium thanks to goals from Moamen Zakaria, Abdallah El Said and Walid Azaro. Zamalek won the second encounter 2-1 which was played on 26 April 2018 at the same stadium, with Kabongo Kasongo and Ayman Hefny scoring for Zamalek and Walid Soliman scoring the only goal for Al Ahly.

== Match ==
=== Officials ===
On 19 September 2019, just one day before the match, the Egyptian Football Association announced German referee Felix Brych as the referee for the match. Brych is ranked as a UEFA elite category referee, and he is considered one of the best referees in Europe. His compatriots Mark Borsch and Kim Stefan Luppwere chosen as the assistant referees, while Egyptian referee Mohamed Hassan was chosen as the fourth official.

=== Details ===
20 September 2019
19:00 CAT

Al Ahly	3–2	Zamalek
Ajayi 19', 49'; El Shahat 45+3'	Report	Alaa 64' (pen.), 76' (pen.)

Borg El Arab Stadium, Alexandria
Attendance: 15,000
Referee: Felix Brych (Germany)

Al Ahly	Zamalek

GK	16	(Egypt) Mohamed El Shenawy	(yellow card) 63'
LB	21	(Tunisia) Ali Maâloul	(yellow card) 45+4'
CB	6	(Egypt) Yasser Ibrahim	(yellow card) 60'	(substituted off) 71'
CB	4	(Egypt) Mahmoud Metwalli		(substituted off) 27'
RB	24	(Egypt) Ahmed Fathy (c)
CM	8	(Egypt) Hamdy Fathy	(yellow card) 45+2'
CM	17	(Egypt) Amr El Solia
AM	19	(Egypt) Mohamed Magdy
LW	7	(Egypt) Ramadan Sobhi
RW	14	(Egypt) Hussein El Shahat
CF	28	(Nigeria) Junior Ajayi		(substituted off) 84'
Substitutes:
GK	1	(Egypt) Sherif Ekramy
DF	30	(Egypt) Mohamed Hany		(substituted in) 27'
MF	11	(Egypt) Walid Soliman
MF	25	(Egypt) Hossam Ashour		(substituted in) 71'
FW	18	(Egypt) Marwan Mohsen		(substituted in) 84'
FW	27	(Egypt) Salah Mohsen
FW	29	(Angola) Geraldo
Manager:
(Switzerland) René Weiler

GK	21	(Egypt) Mohamed Awad
LB	19	(Egypt) Mohamed Abdel Shafy
CB	4	(Egypt) Mahmoud Alaa	(yellow card) 45+4'
CB	5	(Egypt) Mohamed Abdel Ghani		(substituted off) 8'
RB	12	(Tunisia) Hamdi Nagguez
CM	3	(Egypt) Tarek Hamed	(yellow card) 54'
CM	13	(Tunisia) Ferjani Sassi
AM	11	(Egypt) Youssef Obama
LW	27	(Morocco) Mohamed Ounajem		(substituted off) 46'
RW	10	(Egypt) Mahmoud Shikabala (c)		(substituted off) 64'
CF	20	(Morocco) Achraf Bencharki
Substitutes:
GK	1	(Egypt) Mohamed Abou Gabal
DF	22	(Egypt) Abdallah Gomaa
DF	28	(Egypt) Mahmoud Hamdy	(yellow card) 85'	(substituted in) 8'
MF	17	(Egypt) Mahmoud Abdel Aziz
FW	15	(Egypt) Mostafa Mohamed		(substituted in) 46'
FW	26	(Egypt) Emam Ashour		(substituted in) 64'
FW	29	(Morocco) Khalid Boutaïb
Manager:
(Serbia) Milutin Sredojević

Man of the Match:
Junior Ajayi (Al Ahly)

Assistant referees:
Mark Borsch (Germany)
Stefan Lupp (Germany)
Fourth official:
Mohamed Hassan (Egypt)

Match rules

- 90 minutes
- 30 minutes of extra time if necessary
- Penalty shoot-out if scores still level
- Seven named substitutes
- Maximum of three substitutions
