= 2022–23 National Bank of Egypt SC season =

National Bank of Egypt SC
2022–23 season
- Chairman: Ashraf Nassar
- Manager: Khaled Galal (until 1 December); Helmy Toulan (from 1 December until 11 January); Amir Abdel Aziz (interim, from 11 January); Nikodimos Papavasiliou (from 25 January)
- Stadium: Cairo International Stadium
- Egyptian Premier League: 12th
- Egypt Cup: Quarter-finals
- EFA Cup: Quarter-finals
- Top goalscorer: League: Karim Bambo (9); All: Karim Bambo (11)

The 2022–23 National Bank of Egypt SC season was the club's 72nd season in existence and the second consecutive season in the topflight of Egyptian football. In addition to the domestic league, National Bank participated in this season's editions of the Egypt Cup and the EFA Cup.

== Players ==
=== First-team squad ===
As of 28 January 2023

Note: Flags indicate national team as defined under FIFA eligibility rules; some limited exceptions apply. Players may hold more than one non-FIFA nationality.

No.	Pos.	Nation	Player
1	GK	EGY	Ahmed Sobhi
16	GK	EGY	Mohamed Abou Gabal
18	DF	EGY	Mahmoud El Zonfouly
4	DF	EGY	Ahmed Tawfik
6	DF	EGY	Mahmoud El Gazzar
11	DF	GHA	Issahaku Yakubu
12	DF	EGY	Assem Salah
20	DF	EGY	Amir Medhat
24	DF	EGY	Osama Ibrahim
29	DF	EGY	Ahmed Yassin
5	MF	EGY	Mohamed Fathi

No.	Pos.	Nation	Player
7	MF	EGY	Mahmoud Kaoud
8	MF	EGY	Mahmoud Sayed
10	MF	EGY	Karim Bambo
15	MF	CIV	Razack Cissé
17	MF	EGY	Ahmed Said
22	MF	EGY	Islam Gaber
23	MF	GUI	Moussa Diawara
25	MF	EGY	Mohamed Helal
28	MF	EGY	Hamdy Alaa
37	FW	EGY	Osama Faisal (on loan from Zamalek)

=== Out on loan ===
Note: Flags indicate national team as defined under FIFA eligibility rules; some limited exceptions apply. Players may hold more than one non-FIFA nationality.

No.	Pos.	Nation	Player
—	DF	EGY	Mido Mostafa (at Aswan until 30 June 2023)

== Transfers ==
=== In ===
No.	Pos	Player	Transferred from	Fee	Date	Source
4	DF	(Egypt) Ahmed Tawfik	(Egypt) Pyramids	Free	1 September 2022	
16	GK	(Egypt) Mohamed Abou Gabal	(Egypt) Zamalek	Free	4 September 2022	
6	DF	(Egypt) Mahmoud El Gazzar	(Egypt) El Gouna	LE 4,000,000	15 September 2022	
15	FW	(Ivory Coast) Razack Cissé	(Egypt) Zamalek	Free	27 September 2022	

=== Out ===
No.	Pos	Player	Transferred to	Fee	Date	Source
	DF	(Egypt) Mido Mostafa	(Egypt) Aswan	Loan	17 September 2022	
4	DF	(Egypt) Ahmed Tawfik	(Egypt) Pyramids	Undisclosed	22 January 2023	
9	FW	(Egypt) Nasser Mansi	(Egypt) Zamalek	Undisclosed	28 January 2023	

== Pre-season and friendlies ==
Win Draw Loss

2 October 2022 Friendly	ENPPI (Egypt)	1–0	(Egypt) National Bank	Borg El Arab
	Aoufa 78'	Report

5 October 2022 Friendly	Smouha (Egypt)	0–0	(Egypt) National Bank	Alexandria
		Report		Stadium: Alexandria Stadium

9 November 2022 Friendly	National Bank (Egypt)	0–0	(Egypt) Haras El Hodoud	Cairo
		Report		Stadium: Police Academy Stadium

== Competitions ==
=== Overview ===
Competition	First match	Last match	Starting round	Final position	Record							
Competition	First match	Last match	Starting round	Final position	Pld	W	D	L	GF	GA	GD	Win %
Egyptian Premier League	18 October 2022	14 July 2023	Matchday 1	12th	34	9	12	13	35	40	−5	26.47
Egypt Cup	8 May 2023	3 July 2023	Round of 32	Quarter-finals	3	1	1	1	4	6	−2	33.33
EFA Cup	26 March 2023	30 April 2023	Round of 16	Quarter-finals	2	1	1	0	5	2	+3	50.00
Total					39	11	14	14	44	48	−4	28.21

Source: Soccerway

=== Egyptian Premier League ===
==== League table ====
Pos	Team	Pld	W	D	L	GF	GA	GD	Pts
10	Smouha	34	10	12	12	36	43	−7	42 (Note: Head-to-head points: Pharco 6, Smouha 0.)
11	Ismaily	34	9	13	12	35	38	−3	40
12	National Bank of Egypt	34	9	12	13	35	40	−5	39
13	Ceramica Cleopatra	34	7	16	11	31	32	−1	37
14	Tala'ea El Gaish	34	8	12	14	33	45	−12	36

Source: Soccerway
Rules for classification: 1) Points; 2) Head-to-head points; 3) Head-to-head goal difference; 4) Goal difference; 5) Goals scored; 6) Play-off.

==== Results summary ====
Overall								Home						Away					
Pld	W	D	L	GF	GA	GD	Pts	W	D	L	GF	GA	GD	W	D	L	GF	GA	GD
31	8	11	12	34	37	−3	35	7	5	3	24	16	+8	1	6	9	10	21	−11

Last updated: 9 June 2023.
Source: worldfootball

==== Results by round ====
Round	1	2	3	4	5	6	7	8	9	10	11	12	13	14	15	16	17	18	19	20	21	22	23	24	25	26	27	28	29	30	31	32
Ground	H	A	H	A	H	A	H	A	A	H	A	H	A	H	A	H	A	A	H	A	H	A	H	A	H	H	A	H	A	H	A	
Result	D	D	W	L	L	D	L	L	L	W	D	D	D	L	L	D	L	L	D	L	W	L	D	L	W	W	D	W	W	W	D	
Position	6	9	5	10	12	11	13	13	15	12	12	13	14	15	16	14	16	18	18	18	15	16	16	17	16							

Updated to match(es) played on 9 June 2023. Source: worldfootball
A = Away; H = Home; W = Win; D = Draw; L = Loss

==== Matches ====
The league fixtures were announced on 9 October 2022.

18 October 2022 1	National Bank	1–1	Pharco	Cairo
17:00 EST (UTC+2)	Bambo 17'	Report	Abdulaziz 90+6' (pen.)	Stadium: Cairo International Stadium; Referee: Mahmoud Nagi

25 October 2022 2	Smouha	1–1	National Bank	Alexandria
17:00 EST (UTC+2)	Ougola 43'	Report	Helal 31' (pen.)	Stadium: Alexandria Stadium; Referee: Abdelaziz El Sayed

1 November 2022 3	National Bank	3–1	Ceramica Cleopatra	Cairo
19:00 EST (UTC+2)	Nabil 2' (o.g.); Bambo 26'; Cissé 56'	Report	Nabil 65'	Stadium: Cairo International Stadium; Referee: Hesham El Flal

23 November 2022 4	Pyramids	2–0	National Bank	Cairo
17:00 EST (UTC+2)	Fathi 73'; Saber 75'	Report		Stadium: 30 June Stadium; Referee: Ibrahim Nour El Din

30 November 2022 5	National Bank	2–3	ENPPI	Cairo
14:45 EST (UTC+2)	Kaoud 87'; Helal 90+8' (pen.)	Report	Kabou 2'; Labib 5'; Abdel Aati 26'	Stadium: Cairo International Stadium; Referee: Ahmed Gamal

6 December 2022 6	Al Masry	0–0	National Bank	Suez
14:45 EST (UTC+2)		Report		Stadium: Suez Canal Stadium; Referee: Nader Qamar El-Dawla

16 December 2022 7	National Bank	0–1	Zamalek	Cairo
17:00 EST (UTC+2)		Report	Osama 90+6'	Stadium: Cairo International Stadium; Referee: Nader Qamar El-Dawla

20 December 2022 8	Tala'ea El Gaish	1–0	National Bank	Cairo
17:00 EST (UTC+2)	Samir 33'	Report		Stadium: Gehaz El Reyada Stadium; Referee: Ibrahim Nour El Din

24 December 2022 9	Haras El Hodoud	2–1	National Bank	Alexandria
17:00 EST (UTC+2)	Gamal 41' (pen.); Felix 55'	Report	Bambo 45+2' (pen.)	Stadium: Haras El Hodoud Stadium; Referee: Mohamed Salama

30 December 2022 10	National Bank	2–1	Al Mokawloon Al Arab	Cairo
19:00 EST (UTC+2)	Bambo 10' (pen.); Faisal (yellow card) 23'; Cissé 34'; Gaber (yellow card) 88'	Report	Khaled 3'; Farid (yellow card) 67'; Hinestroza (yellow card) 90+2'; Fayed (yellow card) 90+3'	Stadium: Cairo International Stadium; Referee: Ali El Said

3 January 2023 11	Ismaily	0–0	National Bank	Ismailia
19:00 EST (UTC+2)		Report	Tawfik (yellow card) 63'; Diawara (yellow card) 90'	Stadium: Ismailia Stadium; Referee: Ahmed El Ghandour

8 January 2023 12	National Bank	0–0	Aswan	Cairo
14:45 EST (UTC+2)	Yassin (yellow card) 18'; Yasser (yellow card) 25'; El Gazzar (yellow card) 64'	Report	Mostafa (yellow card) 68'; Abdel Rasoul (yellow card) 81'	Stadium: Cairo International Stadium; Referee: Sobhy El Amrawi

11 January 2023 13	El Dakhleya	3–3	National Bank	Cairo
14:45 EST (UTC+2)	Fekri 41'; Haggag 49'; Fawzy 70', (yellow card) 90+11'; Abdel Naby (yellow card) 90+6'	Report	Helal 34', 90+12' (pen.); Diawara 66'; Salah (yellow card) 86'	Stadium: Police Academy Stadium; Referee: Ahmed Naji

19 January 2023 14	National Bank	2–3	Al Ittihad	Cairo
16:45 EST (UTC+2)	Yassin (yellow card) 35'; Tawfik 40', (yellow card) 44'; Salifu 45+3' (o.g.)	Report	Mabululu 52'; Alaa 66'; Amutu 89'	Stadium: Cairo International Stadium; Referee: Mohamed Al Kalawy

24 January 2023 15	Al Ahly	1–0	National Bank	Cairo
19:00 EST (UTC+2)	Sherif 31'	Report	Ibrahim (yellow card) 61'	Stadium: Al Ahly WE Al Salam Stadium; Referee: Ahmed El Ghandour

30 January 2023 16	National Bank	2–2	Ghazl El Mahalla	Cairo
17:00 EST (UTC+2)	Kaoud 4'; Yasser 65'	Report	Orok 16'; Koné 90+7'	Stadium: Cairo International Stadium; Referee: Hesham El Kady

7 February 2023 17	Future	3–0	National Bank	Cairo
19:00 EST (UTC+2)	Ali 23'; Mohsen 45' (pen.); Farouk 79'	Report		Stadium: Al Salam Stadium; Referee: Mohamed El Hanafi

11 February 2023 18	Pharco	1–0	National Bank	Borg El Arab
17:00 EST (UTC+2)	Hamada 4'	Report		Stadium: Borg El Arab Stadium; Referee: Atef Hussein

19 February 2023 19	National Bank	2–2	Smouha	Cairo
17:00 EST (UTC+2)	Simporé 15'; Yasser 61'	Report	Hassan 59'; Saad 76'	Stadium: Petrosport Stadium; Referee: Mohammed Yousef

28 February 2023 20	Ceramica Cleopatra	2–1	National Bank	Cairo
17:00 EST (UTC+2)	Kalawa 77'; Mohsen 90+6'	Report	Bambo 51'	Stadium: Osman Ahmed Osman Stadium; Referee: Walid Abdelrazek

13 March 2023 21	National Bank	2–1	Pyramids	Cairo
18:00 EST (UTC+2)	Fathi 20'; Kaoud 81'	Report	Ben Youssef 70'	Stadium: Osman Ahmed Osman Stadium; Referee: Mohamed Al Kalawy

30 March 2023 22	ENPPI	2–1	National Bank	Cairo
21:15 EST (UTC+2)	Aoufa 14'; Dawoud 61'	Report	Bambo 31'	Stadium: Petrosport Stadium; Referee: Nader Kamar

9 April 2023 24	Zamalek	1–0	National Bank	Cairo
21:15 EST (UTC+2)	El-Wensh 30'	Report		Stadium: Cairo International Stadium; Referee: Wael Farhan

15 April 2023 25	National Bank	2–0	Tala'ea El Gaish	Cairo
21:15 EST (UTC+2)	Stouhi 25' (o.g.); Faisal 51'	Report		Stadium: Cairo International Stadium; Referee: Abdelaziz El Sayed

19 April 2023 26	National Bank	1–0	Haras El Hodoud	Cairo
21:15 EST (UTC+2)	Sayed 22'	Report		Stadium: Cairo International Stadium; Referee: Walid Abdelrazek

25 April 2023 23	National Bank	0–0	Al Masry	Cairo
18:00 EST (UTC+2)		Report		Stadium: Police Academy Stadium; Referee: Amin Omar
Note: The game, which was initially slated for 2 April 2023, was postponed.

4 May 2023 27	Al Mokawloon Al Arab	1–1	National Bank	Cairo
19:00 EST (UTC+3)	Ochaya 45+3'	Report	Yasser 14'	Stadium: Osman Ahmed Osman Stadium; Referee: Mohamed El Atabani
Note: The game, which was initially slated for 24 April 2023, was postponed.

17 May 2023 28	National Bank	2–0	Ismaily	Cairo
20:00 EST (UTC+3)	Bambo 34'; Helal 63' (pen.)	Report		Stadium: Cairo International Stadium; Referee: Ibrahim Nour El Din

23 May 2023 29	Aswan	1–2	National Bank	Aswan
19:00 EST (UTC+3)	Zaky 51'	Report	Bambo 66'; Helal 77' (pen.)	Stadium: Aswan Stadium; Referee: Mohamed El Hanafi

31 May 2023 30	National Bank	3–1	El Dakhleya	Cairo
19:00 EST (UTC+3)	Kaoud 22'; Faisal 32', 61' (pen.)	Report	Fekri 56' (pen.)	Stadium: Cairo International Stadium; Referee: Ahmed Ghandour

9 June 2023 31	Al Ittihad	0–0	National Bank	Alexandria
20:00 EST (UTC+3)		Report		Stadium: Alexandria Stadium; Referee: Mahmoud Nagi

=== Egypt Cup ===
8 May 2023 Round of 32	National Bank	3–2	Young Muslims Qena	Cairo
18:00 EST (UTC+2)	Diawara 45+3'; Sadek 54' (o.g.); Kaoud 59'		Ahmed 30'; Hashem 87' (pen.)	Stadium: Cairo International Stadium; Referee: Mahmoud Mansour

23 June 2023 Round of 16	Tala'ea El Gaish	1–1 (a.e.t.) (7–8 p)	National Bank	Cairo
18:30 EST (UTC+3)	Tarek 10'		Yasser 89'	Stadium: Gehaz El Reyada Stadium; Referee: Sobhy El Amrawy
	Penalties
	Wadi (penalty scored); Sherif (penalty missed); Mohareb (penalty missed); Halawa (penalty scored); Meteb (penalty scored); Stouhi (penalty scored); Fathallah (penalty scored); Hamdy (penalty scored); Radwan (penalty scored); Wadi (penalty missed)		(penalty missed) Simporé; (penalty scored) Bambo; (penalty scored) Bassiouny; (penalty missed) El Sayed; (penalty scored) Helal; (penalty scored) El Gazzar; (penalty scored) Fathy; (penalty scored) Yakubu; (penalty scored) Abou Gabal; (penalty scored) Helal

3 July 2023 Quarter-finals	National Bank	v	Pyramids	Cairo
20:30 EST (UTC+3)				Stadium: Cairo International Stadium

=== EFA Cup ===
26 March 2023 Round of 16	Zamalek	0–3	National Bank	Cairo
21:15 EST (UTC+2)			Bambo 84'; Helal 87'; Gomaa 90+1' (o.g.)	Stadium: Osman Ahmed Osman Stadium; Referee: Mostafa Osman
Note: The match was played at Osman Ahmed Osman Stadium instead of Cairo International Stadium due to maintenance.

30 April 2023 Quarter-finals	National Bank	2–2 (3–4 p)	Ceramica Cleopatra	Cairo
18:30 EST (UTC+2)				Stadium: Cairo International Stadium
