= 2020 Egyptian Super Cup =

2018–19 Egyptian Super Cup
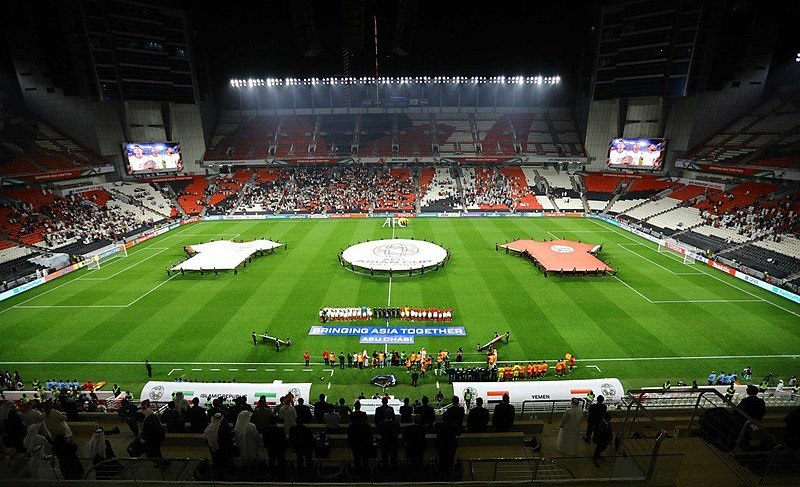
- Mohammed bin Zayed Stadium hosted the match
Al Ahly	Zamalek
0	0
- Zamalek won 4–3 on penalties
- Date: 20 February 2020
- Venue: Mohammed bin Zayed Stadium, Abu Dhabi
- Referee: Svein Oddvar Moen (Norway)
- Attendance: 33,790
- Weather: Fair; 25 °C (77 °F); 41% humidity

The 2020 Egyptian Super Cup (also known as the 2018–19 SAIB Egyptian Super Cup for sponsorship reasons) was the 17th Egyptian Super Cup, an annual football match played between the winners of the previous season's Egyptian Premier League and Egypt Cup. It was played at Mohammed bin Zayed Stadium in Abu Dhabi, United Arab Emirates, on 20 February 2020, contested by Al Ahly and Zamalek.

Zamalek defeated Al Ahly and won the match 4–3 on penalties after being tied 0–0, winning the Egyptian Super Cup title for the fourth time in their history.

== Background ==
In the 2018–19 Egyptian Premier League, Al Ahly and Zamalek were joined by Pyramids in title race throughout the season. Pyramids managed to grab 10 points out of 12 possible from their matches against Al Ahly and Zamalek and were leading the table by Matchday 29. However, after winning only 1 match and drawing 4 in their last 5 matches of the season, Pyramids missed their chance to win the league and to qualify for the CAF Champions League as they finished the league in 3rd place. Al Ahly eventually won the league for the 41st time in their history with 1 game to spare following their 3–1 win against Al Mokawloon Al Arab.

Zamalek won the 2018–19 Egypt Cup after defeating Pyramids 3–0 in the final, winning the title for the 27th time in their history. Identical to the previous editions of the competition, the Egyptian Football Association were heavily criticized for the draw procedure where the cup defending champions and the league winners were placed in different paths to make sure that they could face each other only in the final.

During the 2018–19 season, both teams met each other in the league two times and once in the Egyptian Super Cup. The first encounter was played on 30 March 2019 at Borg El Arab Stadium and ended goalless. Al Ahly won the second encounter 1–0 which was played on 28 July 2019 at the same stadium thanks to Ali Maâloul's second-half strike. The third encounter was the previous season's super cup, which was played on 20 September 2019 and also at Borg El Arab Stadium. Al Ahly won the match 3–2 with two goals from Junior Ajayi and one from Hussein El Shahat, while Mahmoud Alaa scored a brace of penalties for Zamalek.

== Venue ==
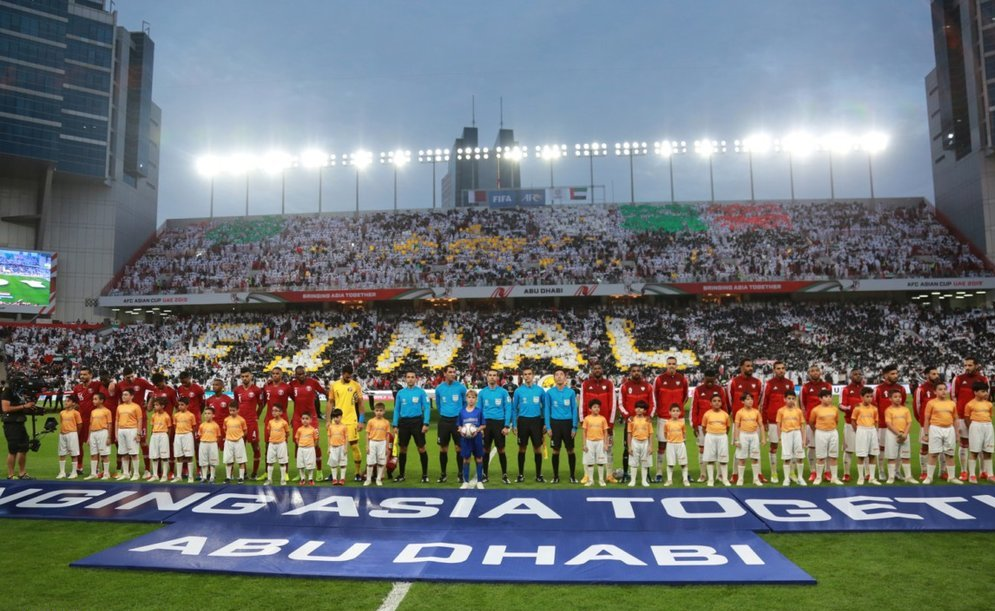
Mohammed bin Zayed Stadium during a match in the 2019 AFC Asian Cup.

The match was played at Mohammed bin Zayed Stadium in Abu Dhabi, United Arab Emirates. The stadium has an estimated capacity of 37,500 and is the home venue of UAE Pro League side Al Jazira. It was one of the eight venues that hosted the 2019 AFC Asian Cup in the country, including one of the semi-final matches.

The stadium also hosted the 2016–17 Egyptian Super Cup between both teams on 10 February 2017, which was won by Zamalek 3–1 on penalties after the game originally ended goalless.

== Pre-game ==
Al Ahly's main winger Ramadan Sobhi was not included in the traveling squad to the United Arab Emirates after suffering from a hamstring injury during training in late December 2019. Other notable excluded players were Hamdy Fathy, who is on the recovery stage from a torn ACL injury, and striker Marwan Mohsen.

Zamalek lost Mohamed Abdel Ghani's services for the match as he suffered from pubalgia during training just four days after facing Espérance de Tunis in the 2018–19 CAF Super Cup, which was won 3–1 by his side.

== Match ==
=== Officials ===
On 16 February 2020, the Egyptian Football Association named Norwegian referee Svein Oddvar Moen as the referee for the match. Moen is familiar with Egyptian football, as he officiated the Cairo derby between the two teams during the 2015–16 Egyptian Premier League in addition to the 2017 Egypt Cup Final between Al Ahly and Al Masry. His compatriots Magnus Lundberg and Kim Tomas Haglund were chosen as the assistant referees, while Tore Hansen was chosen as the fourth official. Croatian referee Goran Gabrilo was named the video assistant referee, and fellow Croatian Miro Grgić appointed as the assistant video assistant referee.

=== Details ===
20 February 2020
21:00 GST (UTC+4)

Al Ahly	0–0	Zamalek
	Report
Penalties
Maâloul (penalty scored); El Solia (penalty scored); Metwalli (penalty scored); Hany (penalty missed); Badji (penalty missed)	3–4	(penalty scored) Alaa; (penalty scored) Sassi; (penalty missed) Bencharki; (penalty scored) Hamed; (penalty scored) Gomaa

Mohammed bin Zayed Stadium, Abu Dhabi
Attendance: 33,790
Referee: Svein Oddvar Moen (Norway)

Al Ahly	Zamalek

GK	16	(Egypt) Mohamed El Shenawy (c)
LB	21	(Tunisia) Ali Maâloul
CB	6	(Egypt) Yasser Ibrahim
CB	5	(Egypt) Ramy Rabia
RB	30	(Egypt) Mohamed Hany
CM	15	(Mali) Aliou Dieng
CM	17	(Egypt) Amr El Solia
AM	19	(Egypt) Mohamed Magdy		(substituted off) 80'
LW	29	(Angola) Geraldo		(substituted off) 88'
RW	14	(Egypt) Hussein El Shahat		(substituted off) 72'
CF	28	(Nigeria) Junior Ajayi	(yellow card) 74'
Substitutes:
GK	1	(Egypt) Sherif Ekramy
DF	4	(Egypt) Mahmoud Metwalli		(substituted on) 88'
DF	12	(Egypt) Ayman Ashraf
DF	24	(Egypt) Ahmed Fathy
MF	11	(Egypt) Walid Soliman
FW	18	(Senegal) Aliou Badji		(substituted on) 80'
FW	26	(Egypt) Mahmoud Kahraba	(red card) PSO	(substituted on) 72'
Manager:
(Switzerland) René Weiler

GK	1	(Egypt) Mohamed Abou Gabal
LB	19	(Egypt) Mohamed Abdel Shafy
CB	4	(Egypt) Mahmoud Alaa
CB	28	(Egypt) Mahmoud Hamdy
RB	7	(Egypt) Hazem Emam (c)
CM	3	(Egypt) Tarek Hamed	(yellow card) 74'
CM	13	(Tunisia) Ferjani Sassi
AM	11	(Egypt) Youssef Obama		(substituted off) 70'
LW	20	(Morocco) Achraf Bencharki
RW	25	(Egypt) Ahmed Sayed		(substituted off) 80'
CF	15	(Egypt) Mostafa Mohamed		(substituted off) 84'
Substitutes:
GK	21	(Egypt) Mohamed Awad
DF	6	(Egypt) Mohamed Abdel Salam
DF	22	(Egypt) Abdallah Gomaa		(substituted on) 70'
FW	10	(Egypt) Mahmoud Shikabala		(substituted on) 84'
FW	14	(Egypt) Mostafa Fathi
FW	26	(Egypt) Emam Ashour
FW	27	(Morocco) Mohamed Ounajem		(substituted on) 80'
Manager:
(France) Patrice Carteron

Man of the Match:
Assistant referees:
Magnus Lundberg (Norway)
Kim Tomas Haglund (Norway)
Fourth official:
Tore Hansen (Norway)
Video assistant referee:
Goran Gabrilo (Croatia)
Assistant video assistant referee:
Miro Grgić (Croatia)

Match rules

- 90 minutes
- Penalty shoot-out if scores level
- Seven named substitutes
- Maximum of three substitutions
