= 2017 Egyptian Super Cup =

2016–17 Egyptian Super Cup
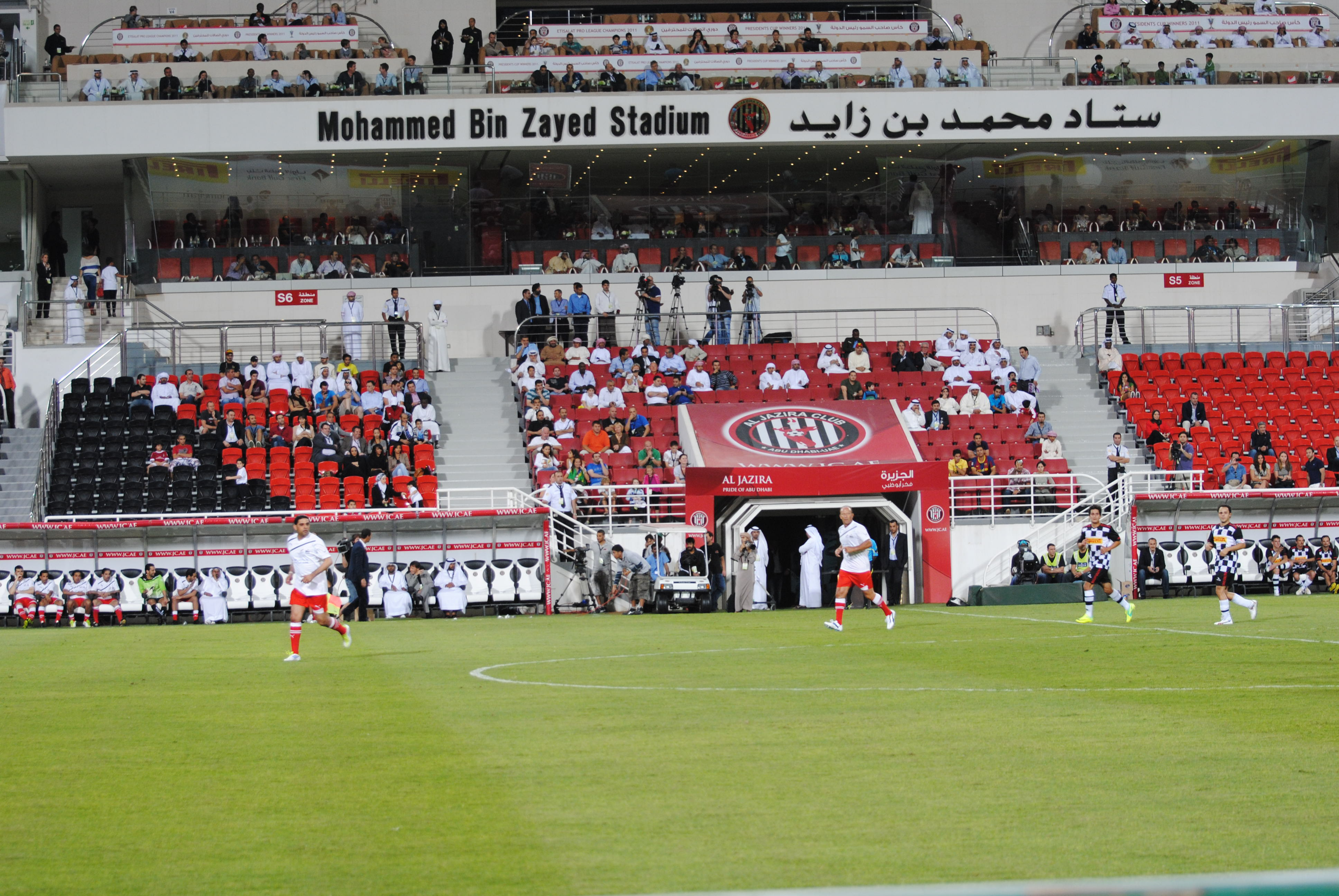
- Mohammed bin Zayed Stadium hosted the match
| Al Ahly | Zamalek |
| 0 | 0 |
- Zamalek won 3–1 on penalties
- Date: 10 February 2017
- Venue: Mohammed Bin Zayed Stadium, Abu Dhabi
- Referee: Pavel Královec (Czech Republic)
- Attendance: 35,000
- Weather: Partly clear 22 °C (72 °F); 63% humidity

The 2017 Egyptian Super Cup was the 14th edition of the Egyptian Super Cup, an annual football match between the winners of the previous season's Egyptian Premier League and Egypt Cup. The match is usually contested by the winners of the Premier League and the Egypt Cup, Al Ahly won the 2015–16 Egyptian Premier League, Zamalek won the 2016 Egypt Cup. The match was played for 2nd time on international soil at the Mohammed Bin Zayed Stadium in Abu Dhabi, United Arab Emirates.

Zamalek won the trophy after beating Al Ahly 3–1 in the penalty shoot-out, with the game ending 0–0.

== Match details ==
10 February 2017
20:00 (UTC+4)

| Al Ahly | 0–0 | Zamalek |
|---|---|---|
| | [[[Category:All articles with unsourced statements]] Report] |
Penalties
| Zakaria (penalty missed); Hegazy (penalty scored); Gomma (penalty missed); Ghaly (penalty missed) | 1–3 | (penalty scored) Morsy; (penalty scored) O. Ibrahim; (penalty scored) Refaat |

Mohammed Bin Zayed Stadium, Abu Dhabi
Attendance: 35,000
Referee: Pavel Královec (Czech Republic)

| Al Ahly | Zamalek |

| GK | 1 | (Egypt) Sherif Ekramy |
| RB | 30 | (Egypt) Mohamed Hany |
| CB | 20 | (Egypt) Saad Samir |
| CB | 5 | (Egypt) Ahmed Hegazy |
| LB | 7 | (Egypt) Hussein El Sayed | (yellow card) ?' |
| CM | 24 | (Egypt) Ahmed Fathy | | (substituted off) ?' |
| DMC | 25 | (Egypt) Hossam Ashour |
| Amc | 19 | (Egypt) Abdallah Said | | (substituted off) ?' |
| WL | 11 | (Egypt) Walid Soliman | | (substituted off) ?' |
| WR | 9 | (Egypt) Moamen Zakaria |
| CF | 28 | (Nigeria) Junior Ajayi |
Substitutes:
| MF | 15 | (Egypt) Saleh Gomaa | | (substituted in) ?' |
| CM | 35 | (Egypt) Karim Walid | | (substituted in) ?' |
| CM | 14 | (Egypt) Hossam Ghaly | | (substituted in) ?' |
Manager:
(Egypt) Hossam El-Badry

| GK | 16 | (Egypt) Gennesh |
| RB | 29 | (Egypt) Osama Ibrahim |
| CB | 25 | (Egypt) Ali Gabr |
| CB | 28 | (Egypt) Mahmoud Hamdy |
| LB | 11 | (Egypt) Mohamed Nasef |
| DM | 3 | (Egypt) Tarek Hamed |
| CM | 4 | (Egypt) Ahmed Tawfik |
| CM | 15 | (Burkina Faso) Maarouf Youssef | | (substituted off) 70' |
| RW | 20 | (Egypt) Mohamed Ibrahim | | (substituted off) 55' |
| LW | 23 | (Nigeria) Stanley Ohawuchi | | (substituted off) 85' |
| FW | 17 | (Egypt) Basem Morsy | (yellow card) 40' |
Substitutes:
| GK | 1 | (Egypt) Ahmed El Shenawy |
| DF | 6 | (Egypt) Shawky El Said |
| MF | 13 | (Egypt) Mahmoud Abdel-Aati | (yellow card) 82' | (substituted in) 70' |
| MF | 18 | (Egypt) Ahmed Refaat | | (substituted in) 55' |
| AM | 30 | (Egypt) Mostafa Fathi | | (substituted in) 85' |
| FW | 9 | (Egypt) Ahmed Gaafar |
| FW | 19 | (Egypt) Hossam Salama |
Manager:
(Egypt) Mohammed Helmy

- Assistant referees:
- Fourth official:

Match rules:

- 90 minutes.
- Penalty shoot-out if scores still level.
- Seven named substitutes, of which up to three may be used.
