= Mahmoud Abdel Aziz (footballer) =

Egyptian footballer (born 1990)

Personal information
- Full name: Mahmoud Abdel Aziz
- Date of birth: 27 July 1990 (age 36)
- Place of birth: Egypt
- Position: Center midfielder

Youth career
- El Qanah

Senior career*
Years	Team	Apps	(Gls)
2009–2010	El Qanah	1	(0)
2012–2017	Ismaily	67	(3)
2017–2018	Smouha	39	(4)
2018–2022	Zamalek	52	(6)

International career
2018	Egypt	2	(0)
- * Club domestic league appearances and goals as of 1 January 2022

Mahmoud Abdel Aziz (born 27 July 1990) is an Egyptian professional footballer who plays as a midfielder. In May 2018, he was named in Egypt's preliminary squad for the 2018 FIFA World Cup in Russia.

== Honours ==
Zamalek SC

- Egyptian Premier League 2020-21
- Egypt Cup: 2018, 2019
- Egyptian Super Cup: 2019–20
- Saudi-Egyptian Super Cup: 2018
- CAF Confederation Cup : 2018–19
- CAF Super Cup: 2020
