= Ferjani Sassi =

Tunisian footballer (born 1992)

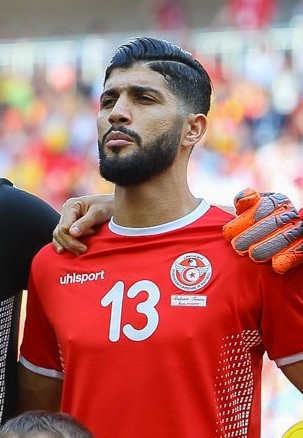
- Sassi with Tunisia at the 2018 FIFA World Cup

Personal information
- Full name: Ferjani Sassi
- Date of birth: 18 March 1992 (age 34)
- Place of birth: Ariana, Tunisia
- Height: 1.86 m (6 ft 1 in)
- Position: Midfielder

Team information
- Current team: Al-Gharafa
- Number: 13

Youth career
- CS Sfaxien

Senior career*
Years	Team	Apps	(Gls)
2011–2014	CS Sfaxien	78	(8)
2015–2016	Metz	39	(1)
2016–2018	ES Tunis	29	(6)
2018	Al Nassr	8	(0)
2018–2021	Zamalek	64	(12)
2021–2023	Al-Duhail	35	(3)
2023–	Al-Gharafa	53	(13)

International career^{‡}
2013–	Tunisia	104	(9)
Medal record
Representing Tunisia
Men's football
FIFA Arab Cup
Runner-up	2021 Qatar
- * Club domestic league appearances and goals as of 21 November 2025 ‡ National team caps and goals as of 18:13, 17 November 2026 (UTC)

Ferjani Sassi (Arabic: فرجاني ساسي; born 18 March 1992) is a Tunisian professional footballer who plays as a midfielder for Qatar Stars League club Al-Gharafa and the Tunisia national team.

== Club career ==
Sassi started his career with CS Sfaxien where he won the Tunisian League and CAF Confederation Cup in 2013, then he transferred to French club Metz in 2015. In 2018, he went back to Tunisia to join ES Tunis, then he played for Al Nassr in Saudi Arabia, and Zamalek in Egypt.

== International career ==
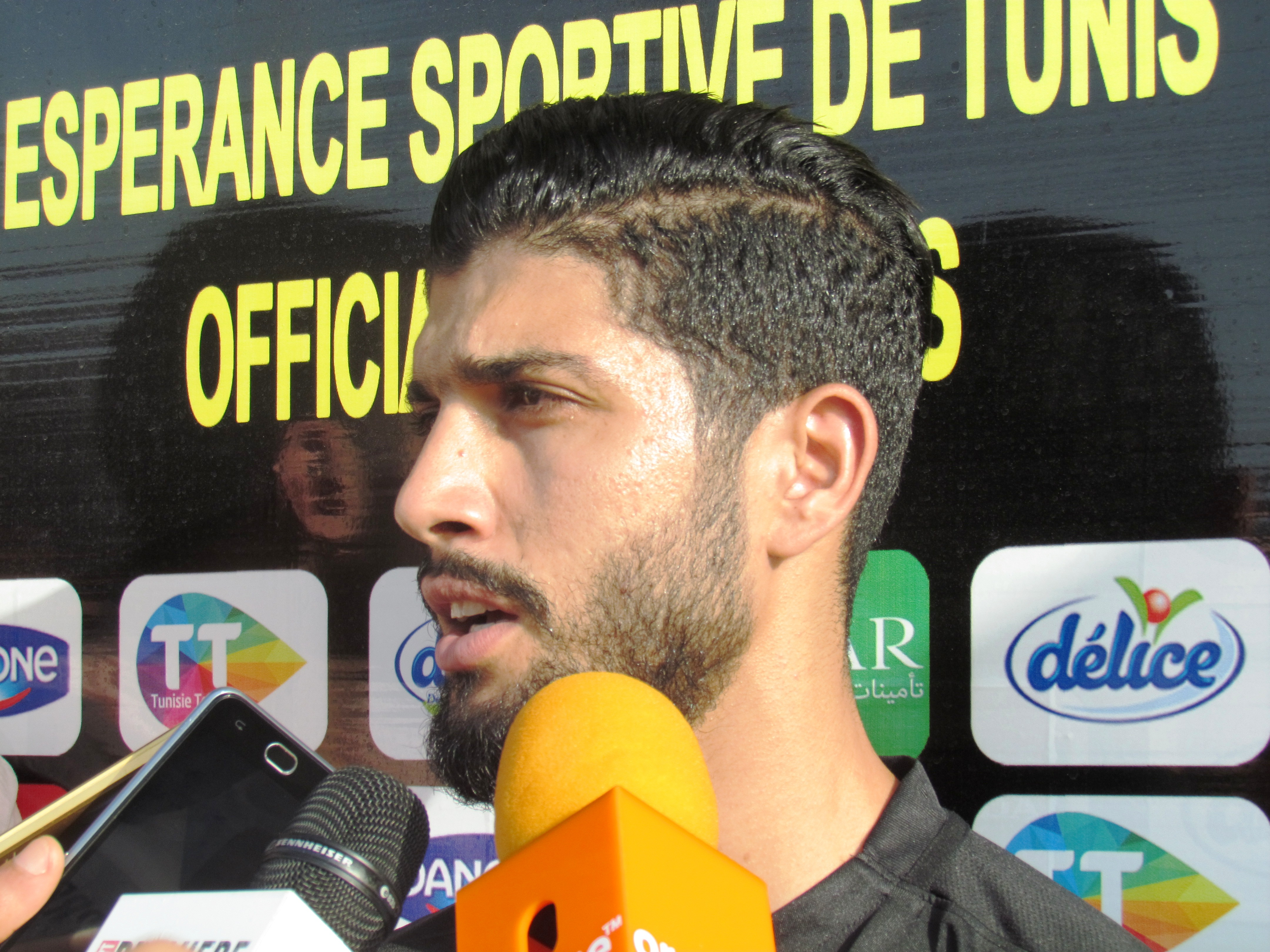
Sassi in 2017

Sassi played his first international game with the Tunisia senior national team on 8 June 2013, against Sierra Leone (2–2), where he was part of the starting squad and played the entire match.

He was in Tunisia's squad for the 2018 FIFA World Cup in Russia, scoring a penalty in Tunisia's opening game against England. In November 2022, he was named in the squad for the 2022 FIFA World Cup in Qatar. On 30 December 2025, he made his 100th international appearance in a 1–1 draw against Tanzania during the 2025 Africa Cup of Nations. He was left out of the final squad for the 2026 FIFA World Cup by coach Sabri Lamouchi.

== Career statistics ==
As of 17 November 2026

Appearances and goals by national team and year
National team	Year	Apps	Goals
Tunisia	2013	5	0
Tunisia	2014	6	1
Tunisia	2015	10	1
Tunisia	2016	5	0
Tunisia	2017	10	0
Tunisia	2018	10	2
Tunisia	2019	11	1
Tunisia	2020	2	0
Tunisia	2021	13	0
Tunisia	2022	7	1
Tunisia	2023	1	0
Tunisia	2024	4	1
Tunisia	2025	16	2
Tunisia	2026	3	0
Total		104	9

Scores and results list Tunisia's goal tally first, score column indicates score after each Sassi goal.

List of international goals scored by Ferjani Sassi
No.	Date	Venue	Opponent	Score	Result	Competition
1	15 October 2014	Stade Mustapha Ben Jannet, Monastir, Tunisia	Senegal	1–0	1–0	2015 Africa Cup of Nations qualification
2	12 June 2015	Radès Olympic Stadium, Radès, Tunisia	Djibouti	4–0	8–1	2017 Africa Cup of Nations qualification
3	1 June 2018	Stade de Genève, Geneva, Switzerland	Turkey	2–1	2–2	Friendly
4	18 June 2018	Volgograd Arena, Volgograd, Russia	England	1–1	1–2	2018 FIFA World Cup
5	11 July 2019	Al Salam Stadium, Cairo, Egypt	Madagascar	1–0	3–0	2019 Africa Cup of Nations
6	14 June 2022	Panasonic Stadium Suita, Osaka, Japan	Japan	2–0	3–0	2022 Kirin Cup
7	5 September 2024	Hammadi Agrebi Stadium, Radès, Tunisia	Madagascar	1–0	1–0	2025 Africa Cup of Nations qualification
8	4 September 2025	Hammadi Agrebi Stadium, Radès, Tunisia	Liberia	2–0	3–0	2026 FIFA World Cup qualification
9	13 October 2025	Hammadi Agrebi Stadium, Radès, Tunisia	Namibia	3–0	3–0	2026 FIFA World Cup qualification

== Honours ==
CS Sfaxien

- Tunisian Ligue Professionnelle 1: 2012–13
- CAF Confederation Cup: 2013

ES Tunis

- Tunisian Ligue Professionnelle 1: 2016–17, 2017–18
- Tunisian Cup: 2015–16

Zamalek

- Egyptian Premier League: 2020–21
- Egypt Cup: 2018–19, 2020–21
- Egyptian Super Cup: 2019–20
- CAF Confederation Cup: 2018–19
- CAF Super Cup: 2020
- Saudi-Egyptian Super Cup: 2018

Al-Duhail

- Qatar Stars League: 2022–23
- Emir of Qatar Cup: 2022
- Qatar Cup: 2023
- Qatari Stars Cup: 2022–23

Tunisia

- Kirin Cup Soccer: 2022

Individual

- Qatar Stars League Team of the Year: 2023–24
