= Wagih Abdel Hakim =

Egyptian footballer (born 1998)

Personal information
- Full name: Wagih Abdel Hakim
- Date of birth: 1 March 1998 (age 28)
- Place of birth: Egypt
- Position: Winger

Team information
- Current team: Ismaily
- Number: 17

Senior career*
Years	Team	Apps	(Gls)
- Ala'ab Damanhour
2017–	Ismaily	25	(2)

International career^{‡}
2017–	Egypt	2	(1)
- * Club domestic league appearances and goals as of 16:00, 20 July 2018 (UTC) ‡ National team caps and goals as of 16:00, 20 July 2018 (UTC)

Wagih Abdel Hakim (Arabic: وجيه عبد الحكيم; born 1 March 1998) is an Egyptian footballer who plays as a winger for Ismaily in the Egyptian Premier League.

== Club career ==
Hakim began his career at Ala'ab Damanhour before signing for Ismaily in January 2017.

== International career ==
On 5 June 2017, Hakim made his debut for Egypt in a 1–0 win against Libya, scoring in the 65th minute. Hakim made his second appearance for Egypt in an African Nations Championship game against Morocco on 13 August 2017.

=== International goals ===
Scores and results list Egypt's goal tally first.

#	Date	Venue	Opponent	Score	Result	Competition
1	5 June 2017	Petro Sport Stadium, New Cairo, Egypt	Libya	1–0	1–0	Friendly
