= Yahya Zayd =

Tanzanian footballer

Personal information
- Full name: Yahya Zayd
- Date of birth: 21 June 1996 (age 30)
- Place of birth: Morogoro, Tanzania
- Position: Forward

Team information
- Current team: Ismaily

Senior career*
| Years | Team | Apps | (Gls) |
| 2013–2018 | Azam FC | | |
| 2018– | Ismaily SC | 1 | (0) |

International career^{‡}
| 2017– | Tanzania | 5 | (0) |
- * Club domestic league appearances and goals ‡ National team caps and goals as of 1 June 2019

Yahya Zayd (born 21 June 1996) is a Tanzanian international footballer who plays for Egyptian team Ismaily.
