= Mohamed Fawzy =

Egyptian footballer (born 1993)

Personal information
- Full name: Mohamed Fawzy Noaman
- Date of birth: 10 July 1993 (age 33)
- Place of birth: Kafr El Battikh, Damietta, Egypt
- Position: Goalkeeper

Team information
- Current team: Ismaily
- Number: 1

Youth career
- –2013: Al Ahly
- 2013–2014: Tala'ea El Gaish

Senior career*
Years	Team	Apps	(Gls)
2014–2015	Tala'ea El Gaish	6	(0)
2015–2017	Ghazl El Mahalla	31	(0)
2017–24	Ismaily	58	(0)
2024-	Petrojet SC	0	(0)

International career^{‡}
- Egypt U23
- * Club domestic league appearances and goals as of 23:14, 23 December 2021 (UTC) ‡ National team caps and goals as of 23:14, 23 December 2021 (UTC)

Mohamed Fawzy Noaman (Arabic: مُحَمَّد فَوْزِيّ نُعْمَان; born 10 July 1993) is an Egyptian professional footballer who plays as a goalkeeper for Ismaily.

== Career statistics ==
=== Club ===
As of 23 December 2021.

Club	Season	League			Cup		Continental		Other		Total	
Club	Season	Division	Apps	Goals	Apps	Goals	Apps	Goals	Apps	Goals	Apps	Goals
Tala'ea El Gaish	2014–15	Egyptian Premier League	6	0	0	0	0	0	0	0	6	0
Ghazl El Mahalla	2015–16	Egyptian Premier League	31	0	0	0	0	0	0	0	31	0
Ismaily	2017–18	Egyptian Premier League	0	0	0	0	0	0	0	0	0	0
Ismaily	2018–19	Egyptian Premier League	19	0	1 (Note: Appearances in the Egyptian Cup)	0	5 (Note: Appearances in the CAF Champions League)	0	0	0	25	0
Ismaily	2019–20	Egyptian Premier League	14	0	0	0	0	0	0	0	14	0
Ismaily	2020–21	Egyptian Premier League	20	0	2	0	0	0	0	0	22	0
Ismaily	2021–22	Egyptian Premier League	5	0	0	0	0	0	0	0	5	0
Ismaily	Total		58	0	3	0	5	0	0	0	66	0
Career total			95	0	3	0	5	0	0	0	103	0
