= Youssef Obama =

Egyptian footballer (born 1995)

Personal information
- Full name: Youssef Ibrahim
- Date of birth: 2 December 1995 (age 30)
- Place of birth: Alexandria, Egypt
- Height: 1.78 m (5 ft 10 in)
- Position: Midfielder

Team information
- Current team: Pyramids

Youth career
- 2007–2013: Zamalek

Senior career*
Years	Team	Apps	(Gls)
2014–2024	Zamalek	160	(33)
2015–2016	→ Al Ittihad (loan)	32	(7)
2016–2017	→ Wadi Degla (loan)	13	(2)
2023	→ Al-Hazem (loan)	16	(1)
2024–	Pyramids	4	(0)
- * Club domestic league appearances and goals

Youssef Ibrahim (Arabic: يُوسُف إِبْرَاهِيم; born 2 December 1995), nicknamed Youssef Obama (Arabic: يُوسُف أُوبَامَا), is an Egyptian professional footballer who plays as a midfielder for Egyptian Premier League club Pyramids.

== Career ==
Obama began his career with Zamalek, being promoted from the under-23 squad to the first team in July 2014 by manager Mido. He was given the nickname Obama due to his resemblance to former U.S. President Barack Obama. In the 2013–14 season, Obama won the Egypt Cup 2013–14. In the 2014–15 season, Obama won the league 2014–15 and the Egypt Cup 2014–15.

In 2015, he joined Al Ittihad on a season long loan deal, along with teammate Ahmed Samir. He scored seven goals in 31 appearances to finish the season as the club's top goalscorer.

During his loan spell with Al Ittihad, Obama missed the funeral of his mother in order to play for the club. Having learned of his mother's death hours before a match against El Entag El Harby, he decided to remain with the squad and scored the winning goal in the match before breaking down in tears during his celebration. He later commented, "I wanted to follow my mother’s wishes not to leave my team for any reason." Obama attracted worldwide attention for his reaction to missing a penalty during an Egyptian Premier League match while on loan with Al Ittihad. After seeing his penalty saved, Obama ran straight off the pitch and into the tunnel forcing manager Mokhtar Mokhtar to make a substitution as he failed to return to the pitch.

The following year was sent out on loan again with Wadi Degla, scoring twice in fourteen appearances. After returning to Zamalek, Obama agreed a transfer to Portuguese side C.D. Feirense following the expiration of his contract. However, the transfer was later cancelled and he signed a new four-year contract with Zamalek.

=== Return to Zamalek ===
On 27 August 2017, Obama debuted for Zamalek against Haras El Hodoud SC. He got Shikabala's number 10.

On 21 May 2018, Obama scored the last penalty that marked the defeat of Smouha in the 2018 Egypt Cup final, which Zamalek won after beating Smouha 5–4 on penalties in the final match.

In the same season, Obama won the Saudi-Egyptian Super Cup: 2018.

Obama signed a new four-year contract with Zamalek.

Obama won the CAF Confederation Cup: 2018–19 and the Egypt Cup 2018–19.

On 31 July 2019, Obama decided to hand his number 10 to Shikabala in the new season. His new number became 14.

In 2019–20 season, Obama won the Egyptian Super Cup: 2019–20 and the CAF Super Cup: 2020.

On 2 January 2021, Obama scored a goal in Zamalek's victory over Enppi, with two goals to one at Petrosport Stadium in the fifth round of the Egyptian League.

On 9 January 2021, Obama scored his goal in the 17th minute in the match against Tala'ea El Gaish SC, which ended with Zamalek's 3–0 victory at Al-Jaish Stadium in Suez.

On 19 January 2021, the Zamalek team succeeded in occupying the top of the Egyptian League after beating El Gouna 1–0, the goal was scored by Youssef Obama in the 10th minute of the match that was held between the two teams at Petrosport Stadium.

On 28 January 2021, Obama scored two goals, in Zamalek's victory over Misr Lel Makkasa SC, in the tenth round of the Egyptian League.

Obama won the Egypt Cup 2020–21 and won best player of the tournament.

=== Al Hazem ===
On 23 January 2023, Obama joined Saudi Arabian club Al-Hazem on loan.

=== Return to Zamalek ===
In the 2023–2024 CAF Confederation Cup, Zamalek played v Arta Solar in the qualifying stage. When Zamalek fell behind against Djibouti's Arta Solar and faced early elimination, Obama scored a crucial second-half header that sparked a dramatic 4–1 comeback victory to get Zamalek into the group stage. He scored the only goal of the match in a 1–0 victory over Libya's Abu Salim, securing a vital three points that pushed Zamalek to the top of their group. in the final, after missing roughly two months due to injury, Obama returned to action in the second leg of the final against RS Berkane. He came on as a first-half substitute for the injured Ahmed Hamdi, helping anchor the team to maintain their 1–0 lead (winning the title via the away goals rule).

=== Pyramids ===
In 2024, Obama joined Egyptian club Pyramids. By being a registered member of the squad during the campaign, he officially earned a medal in the CAF Confederation Cup 2023–24 and also won the FIFA African–Asian–Pacific Cup: 2025.

In August 2026, Pyramids secured a commanding 6–0 victory over UAE side Modern Dubai in a friendly match, with Youssef Obama starring with a hat-trick as the team continues preparations for the new season.

== Career statistics ==
=== Club ===
As of match played 5 June 2025

Appearances and goals by club, season and competition
Club	Season	League			National cup (Note: Includes Egypt Cup)		League cup (Note: Includes Egyptian League Cup)		Continental		Other		Total	
Club	Season	Division	Apps	Goals	Apps	Goals	Apps	Goals	Apps	Goals	Apps	Goals	Apps	Goals
Zamalek	2013-14	Egyptian Premier League	12	2	4	0	–		4 (Note: Appearance(s) in the CAF Champions League)	0	–		20	2
Zamalek	2014-15	Egyptian Premier League	4	0	1	0	–		–		–		5	0
Al Ittihad (loan)	2015-16	Egyptian Premier League	32	7	3	2	–		–		–		35	9
Wadi Degla (loan)	2016-17	Egyptian Premier League	13	2	1	0	–		–		–		14	2
Zamalek	2017-18	Egyptian Premier League	14	0	4	2	–		–		–		16	2
Zamalek	2018-19	Egyptian Premier League	30	10	4	1	–		15 (Note: Appearance(s) in the CAF Confederation Cup)	3	1 (Note: Appearance(s) in the Egyptian Super Cup)	0	50	14
Zamalek	2019-20	Egyptian Premier League	24	3	3	0	–		8	0	2 (Note: Includes an appearance in the Egyptian Super Cup and the CAF Super Cup)	1	37	4
Zamalek	2020-21	Egyptian Premier League	28	10	5	4	–		6	1	–		39	15
Zamalek	2021-22	Egyptian Premier League	25	0	3	0	2	0	8	3	–		38	3
Zamalek	2022-23	Egyptian Premier League	5	0	2	0	–		3	0	–		10	0
Al-Hazem (loan)	2022-23	Saudi First Division	15	1	–		–		–		–		15	1
Zamalek	2023-24	Egyptian Premier League	21	8	1	1	–		9	2	–		31	11
Pyramids	2024-25	Egyptian Premier League	14	2	5	3	1	0	5	1	2	0	27	6
Career Total			237	45	36	13	3	0	58	10	5	1	339	69

== Honours ==
Zamalek

- Egyptian Premier League: 2014–15, 2020–21, 2021–22
- Egypt Cup: 2013–14, 2014–15, 2017–18, 2018–19, 2020–21
- Egyptian Super Cup: 2019–20
- CAF Confederation Cup: 2018–19, 2023–24
- CAF Super Cup: 2020
- Saudi-Egyptian Super Cup: 2018

Pyramids

- CAF Champions League: 2024-25
- FIFA African–Asian–Pacific Cup: 2025
