= Emad Hamdy (footballer) =

Egyptian footballer (born 1993)

Personal information
- Full name: Emad Hamdy
- Date of birth: 14 January 1993 (age 33)
- Place of birth: El Mansoura, El Dakahlia, Egypt
- Height: 1.85 m (6 ft 1 in)
- Position: Defensive midfielder

Team information
- Current team: Ismaily
- Number: 4

Youth career
- 2005–2013: El Mansoura

Senior career*
Years	Team	Apps	(Gls)
2013–2015	El Mansoura		
2015–	Ismaily	126	(5)
- * Club domestic league appearances and goals as of 3 January 2021 (UTC)

Emad Hamdy (Arabic: عماد حمدي; born 14 January 1993) is an Egyptian footballer who plays as a defensive midfielder for Egyptian Premier League side Ismaily. During the 2018–19 season, he earned the player of the season award with Ismaily.
