= Karim Bambo =

Egyptian footballer (born 1993)

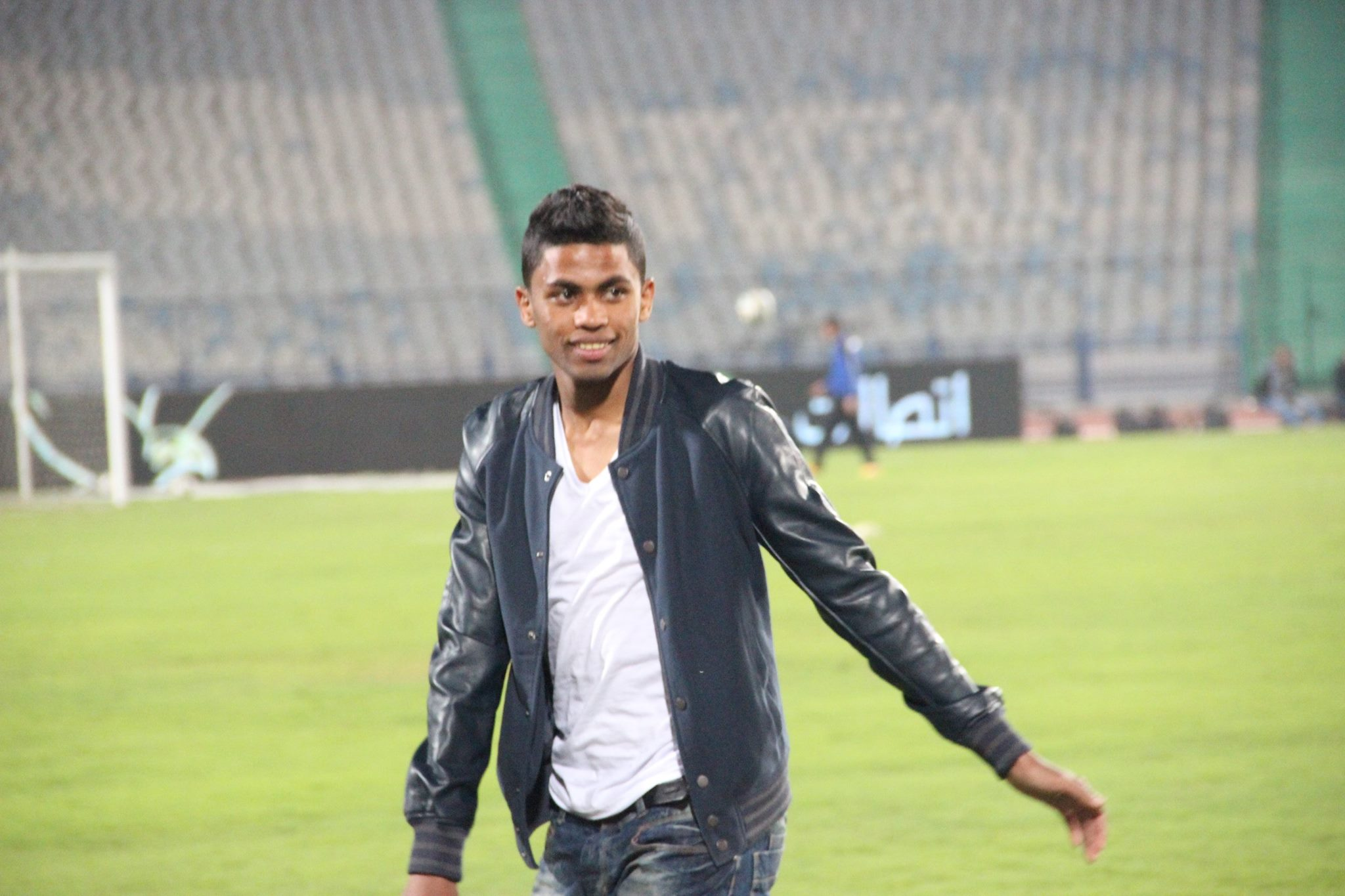
- Karim Bambo in 2014

Personal information
- Full name: محمد احمد سعيد
- Date of birth: 13 May 1993 (age 33)
- Place of birth: El Qoseir, Red Sea, Egypt
- Height: 1.75 m (5 ft 9 in)
- Position: Midfielder

Team information
- Current team: Al Masry
- Number: 10

Youth career
- 2007–2012: El Gouna
- 2012–2014: Al Ahly

Senior career*
| Years | Team | Apps | (Gls) |
| 2014–2015 | Al Ahly | 13 | (1) |
| 2016–2019 | Ismaily | 84 | (19) |
| 2019–2021 | Zamalek | 10 | (1) |
| 2021 | → National Bank of Egypt (loan) | 22 | (12) |
| 2021–2024 | National Bank of Egypt | 81 | (24) |
| 2024– | Al Masry | 7 | (3) |

International career
| 2014–2015 | Egypt U23 | 2 | (0) |
- * Club domestic league appearances and goals

Karim Bambo (Arabic: كريم بامبو; born 13 May 1993) is an Egyptian professional footballer who plays as a midfielder for Egyptian Premier League club Al Masry.

== Honours ==
Zamalek

- Egypt Cup: 2018–19
- Egyptian Super Cup: 2019–20
- CAF Super Cup: 2020
