= Richard Baffour =

Ghanaian footballer (born 1990)

Personal information
- Date of birth: 7 April 1990 (age 36)
- Position: Centre-back

Senior career*
Years	Team	Apps	(Gls)
2011–2017	Bechem United		
2017–2019	Ismaily	54	(4)
2019–2020	Al-Quwa Al-Jawiya		
2020–2021	Al-Ansar		
2021–2022	El Qanah		
2022–2023	Bourj	21	(5)
2023–2024	Shabab Sahel	19	(1)
- * Club domestic league appearances and goals as of 16:19, 11 March 2025 (UTC)

Richard Baffour (born April 1990) is a Ghanaian footballer who plays as a centre-back.

== Career ==
Starting his career at Bechem United, Baffour signed for Ismaily in Egypt in January 2017. On 26 September 2019, he joined Iraqi Premier League side Al-Quwa Al-Jawiya. Following an experience in Saudi Arabia at Al-Ansar, Bafour moved to Bourj in the Lebanese Premier League on 25 July 2022. He is considered as a scoring defender as he scored and participated in several goals for his team Bourj.
