= Tarek Hamed =

Egyptian footballer (born 1988)

Tarek Abubakar
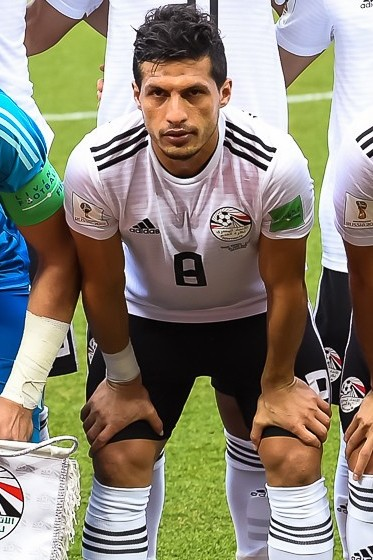
- Hamed with Egypt at the 2018 FIFA World Cup

Personal information
- Full name: Tarek Hamed
- Date of birth: 24 October 1988 (age 38)
- Place of birth: Mansoura, Egypt
- Height: 1.69 m (5 ft 7 in)
- Position: Defensive midfielder

Youth career
- –2008: Tala'ea El-Gaish

Senior career*
Years	Team	Apps	(Gls)
2008–2010	Tala'ea El-Gaish	2	(0)
2010–2014	Smouha	75	(0)
2014–2022	Zamalek	204	(5)
2022–2023	Al-Ittihad	24	(0)
2023–2025	Damac	30	(0)
2025–2026	Al Bidda	0	(0)

International career
2013–2023	Egypt	58	(1)
Medal record
Men's football
Representing Egypt
Africa Cup of Nations
Runner-up	2017 Gabon
- * Club domestic league appearances and goals as of 21 June 2026

Tarek Hamed (Arabic: طارق حامد; born 24 October 1988) is an Egyptian former professional footballer who played as a defensive midfielder.

== Club career ==
=== Smouha ===
After signing for Smouha, Hamed was a key player under the management of Hamada Sedki. He succeeded in being a runner-up in both the Egyptian Premier League and Egypt Cup.

=== Zamalek ===
In 2014, Hamed signed for Zamalek, where he became a key player, winning thirteen national and continental competitions with the club.

=== Al-Ittihad ===
On 24 July 2022, Hamed joined Saudi Arabian club Al-Ittihad on a two-year deal.

=== Damac ===
On 4 September 2023, Hamed joined Saudi Pro League club Damac.

=== CAF Awards ===
Hamed was nominated for the African Player of the Year in 2017 and 2019 and ended up as one of the three finalists at the 2019 CAF Awards for best African-based player.

== International career ==
Hamed has been capped regularly by the Egypt national team, gaining his first cap against Saudi Arabia.

He started all six of Egypt's matches at the 2017 Africa Cup of Nations, in which Egypt won the silver medal. He also played in all four of Egypt's matches at the 2019 Africa Cup of Nations.

In May 2018, he was named in Egypt's preliminary squad for the 2018 FIFA World Cup in Russia, where he eventually started all three of Egypt's matches.

In December 2023, he announced retirement from international football.

== Career statistics ==
=== International ===
Egypt
Year	Apps	Goals
2013	1	0
2014	1	0
2015	2	0
2016	4	0
2017	12	0
2018	11	0
2019	10	0
2020	2	0
2021	6	0
2022	3	0
2023	6	1
Total	58	1

== Honours ==
Zamalek

- Egyptian Premier League: 2014–15, 2020–21, 2021–22
- Egypt Cup: 2014–15, 2015–16, 2017–18, 2018–19, 2020–21
- Egyptian Super Cup: 2016, 2019
- CAF Confederation Cup: 2018–19
- CAF Super Cup: 2020
- Saudi-Egyptian Super Cup: 2018

Al-Ittihad

- Saudi Professional League: 2022–23
- Saudi Super Cup: 2022
