= Selim Abdel Khalek =

Egyptian footballer (born 1993)

Personal information
- Date of birth: 24 July 1993 (age 33)
- Place of birth: Sharqia
- Position: Right back

Team information
- Current team: Pharco
- Number: 2

Senior career*
Years	Team	Apps	(Gls)
2014–2016	Nogoom El Mostakbal		
2016–2017	Aswan	13	(1)
2017–2018	Pyramids	30	(1)
2018–2019	Ismaily	0	(0)
2019–	Pharco	0	(0)
- * Club domestic league appearances and goals as of 22 July 2018

Selim Abdel Khalek (Arabic: سَلِيم عَبْد الْخَالِق; born 24 July 1993) is an Egyptian professional footballer who plays for Pharco FC as a right back.

In 2017, Pyramids FC signed Abdel Khalekfor a 3-year contract for 350,000 Egyptian Pounds from Aswan.
