= Tarek Taha =

Egyptian footballer (born 1991)

Personal information
- Full name: Tarek Taha
- Date of birth: 4 April 1991 (age 35)
- Position: Left back

Team information
- Current team: Pyramids
- Number: 11

Senior career*
Years	Team	Apps	(Gls)
2013–2017	El Entag El Harby	29	(1)
2017–2018	Smouha	25	(1)
2018–2019	Ismaily	27	(1)
2019–	Pyramids	3	(0)
- * Club domestic league appearances and goals

Tarek Taha (born 4 April 1991) is an Egyptian footballer who plays for Egyptian team Pyramids as a left-back.

== Career ==
Taha joined Ismaily SC from Smouha SC in 2018. He was Ismaily's most expensive transfer that season, costing EGP1.2m.

Taha scored the only goal in Ismaily's first round CAF Champions League game in 2018, a curling free kick which helped defeat Burundi's Le Messager. He made several other appearances for Ismaily in their Champions League run.
