= Moussa Diawara =

Guinean footballer (born 1994)

Personal information
- Date of birth: 15 October 1994 (age 32)
- Place of birth: Guinea
- Height: 1.85 m (6 ft 1 in)
- Position: Winger

Team information
- Current team: Tala'ea El-Gaish SC

Senior career*
Years	Team	Apps	(Gls)
2013–2014	Stade Malien		
2014–2017	Kaloum		
2017–2020	El Entag El Harby	75	(5)
2020–23	Bank El Ahly	9	(0)
2023-	Tala'ea El-Gaish SC	26	(1)

International career^{‡}
2015–	Guinea	4	(0)
- * Club domestic league appearances and goals as of 18/8/25 @ 16:10(AEST) ‡ National team caps and goals as of 00:11, 26 March 2021 (UTC)

Moussa Diawara (born 15 October 1994) is a Guinean footballer who plays as a winger for Egyptian Premier League club Bank El Ahly and the Guinea national team.

== Playing career ==
Diawara began his career with Stade Malien and Kaloum in his native Guinea. He moved to Egypt and signed with El Entag El Harby, before joining Bank El Ahly on 2 November 2020.

== International career ==
Haba made his debut with the Guinea national team in a 3–1 2016 African Nations Championship qualification win over Liberia on 22 June 2016.
