= Hamdi Nagguez =

Tunisian footballer (born 1992)

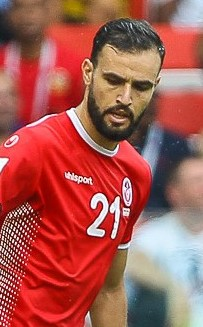
- Nagguez with Tunisia at the 2018 FIFA World Cup

Personal information
- Date of birth: 28 October 1992 (age 34)
- Place of birth: Menzel Kamel, Monastir, Tunisia
- Height: 1.95 m (6 ft 5 in)
- Position: Right back

Team information
- Current team: Al-Najaf
- Number: 4

Youth career
- Étoile du Sahel

Senior career*
Years	Team	Apps	(Gls)
2013–2018	Étoile du Sahel	110	(7)
2018–2019	Zamalek	31	(1)
2020	Sūduva	1	(0)
2020–2021	ES Tunis	22	(1)
2021–2022	Al-Ahli	8	(0)
2022–2024	Ismaily	28	(1)
2025	Al Shahaniya	2	(0)
2025–	Al-Najaf	1	(0)

International career^{‡}
2015–2018	Tunisia	22	(0)
- * Club domestic league appearances and goals as of 21 September 2023 ‡ National team caps and goals as of 8 December 2019

Hamdi Nagguez (Arabic: حَمْدِيّ النَّقَّاز; born 28 October 1992) is a Tunisian professional footballer who plays as a right back for Al-Najaf.

== Club career ==
Nagguez was born in Menzel Kamel, Tunisia, and started his career at Étoile Sportive du Sahel in 2013. During his spell there, he became popular by the fans despite being one of the youngest players in the team. He scored 6 goals with his team in 78 appearances. He was decisive in deciding many titles for his team like 2015 CAF Confederation Cup, Tunisian League, and Tunisian Cup.

== International career ==
Hamdi Nagguez has joined to the Tunisian national team in 2015 during the 2017 Africa Cup of Nations qualification. His international debut was against Liberia on 5 September 2015 when they lost (0–1). He was also decisive in the finals of the African Cup after an assist to Taha Yassine Khenissi against Zimbabwe. He was seriously injured and put him out of action for a long time, forcing him to absent from the match Egypt in 2019 Africa Cup of Nations qualification, but returned in the matches of the DR Cogo and Guinea in 2018 FIFA World Cup qualification.

In June 2018 he was named in Tunisia's 23-man squad for the 2018 FIFA World Cup in Russia.

== Career statistics ==
=== International ===
As of 8 December 2019

Tunisia
Year	Apps	Goals
2015	2	0
2016	4	0
2017	8	0
2018	7	0
Total	21	0

== Honours ==
ES Sahel

- Tunisian Ligue Professionnelle 1: 2016
- Tunisian Cup: 2012, 2014, 2015
- CAF Confederation Cup: 2015

Zamalek

- Egypt Cup: 2017–18, 2018–19
- Saudi-Egyptian Super Cup: 2018
- CAF Confederation Cup: 2018–19
