= Mahmoud Kaoud =

Egyptian footballer (born 1988)

Personal information
- Date of birth: 27 August 1988 (age 38)
- Place of birth: El Minya, Egypt
- Position: Winger

Senior career*
Years	Team	Apps	(Gls)
2013–2014	El Minya	18	(4)
2013–2014	Asyut Petroleum(loan)	2	(0)
2014–2020	Enppi	162	(29)
2020–2024	National Bank	99	(10)

International career^{‡}
2015–	Egypt	1	(0)
- * Club domestic league appearances and goals as of 6 August 2017 ‡ National team caps and goals as of 6 August 2017

Mahmoud Kaoud (Arabic: محمود قاعود; born 27 August 1988) is an Egyptian professional footballer who currently plays as a central midfielder for Egyptian Premier League club National Bank Of Egypt.
