= Mahmoud Metwalli =

Egyptian footballer (born 1993)

Personal information
- Full name: Mahmoud El-Metwalli Mohamed Mansour
- Date of birth: 4 January 1993 (age 33)
- Place of birth: Mansoura, Dakahlia, Egypt
- Height: 1.75 m (5 ft 9 in)
- Positions: Centre back; midfielder

Youth career
- 2002–2012: Ismaily

Senior career*
Years	Team	Apps	(Gls)
2013–2019	Ismaily	130	(17)
2019–2024	Al Ahly	59	(2)
2024–2025	Al Ittihad	13	(0)

International career
2013	Egypt U20	7	(0)
2014–2015	Egypt U23	2	(0)
Medal record
Representing Egypt
Men's football
Africa U-20 Cup of Nations
Winner	2013 Algeria
- * Club domestic league appearances and goals

Mahmoud El-Metwalli Mohamed Mansour (Arabic: محمود المتولي محمد منصور; born 4 January 1993), commonly known as Mahmoud Metwalli, is an Egyptian-born footballer as a midfielder and centre back.

== Career statistics ==
=== Club ===
As of match played on 19 September 2022

Appearances and goals by club, season and competition
Club	Season	League			Cup		Continental		Other		Total	
Club	Season	Division	Apps	Goals	Apps	Goals	Apps	Goals	Apps	Goals	Apps	Goals
Ismaily	2012–13	Egyptian Premier League	6	0	3	0	—				9	0
Ismaily	2013–14	Egyptian Premier League	9	0	1	0	—				10	0
Ismaily	2014–15	Egyptian Premier League	18	0	1	0	—				19	0
Ismaily	2015–16	Egyptian Premier League	17	0	1	0	—				18	0
Ismaily	2016–17	Egyptian Premier League	30	6	2	0	—				32	6
Ismaily	2017–18	Egyptian Premier League	28	5	3	1	—				31	6
Ismaily	2018–19	Egyptian Premier League	22	6	3	0	4	0	—		29	6
Ismaily	Total		130	17	14	1	4	0	0	0	148	18
Al Ahly	2018–19	Egyptian Premier League	0	0	0	0	0	0	1	0	1	0
Al Ahly	2019–20	Egyptian Premier League	10	0	0	0	5	0	1	0	16	0
Al Ahly	2020–21	Egyptian Premier League	1	0	0	0	0	0	0	0	1	0
Al Ahly	2021–22	Egyptian Premier League	7	0	3	0	0	0	1	0	11	0
Al Ahly	2022-23	Egyptian Premier League	17	0	0	0	0	0	4	0	21	0
Al Ahly	Total		35	0	3	0	5	0	7	0	49	0
Career totals			165	17	17	1	9	0	7	0	197	18

=== International ===
As of match played 26 March 2024

National team	Year	Apps	Goals
Egypt U-20	2013	7 (Note: Four appearances in African U-20 Championship) (Note: Three appearances in U-20 World Cup)	0
Egypt U-23	2014	2	0
Total		9	0

== Honours ==
Al Ahly

- Egyptian Premier League: 2019–20, 2022–23, 2023–24
- Egypt Cup: 2019–20, 2021–22, 2022–23
- Egyptian Super Cup: 2019, 2021–22, 2022–23, 2023–24
- CAF Champions League: 2019–20, 2022–23, 2023–24
- CAF Super Cup: 2021 (May), 2021 (Dec)

Egypt U20

- African U-20 Championship: 2013
