= Abdallah Gomaa =

Egyptian footballer (born 1996)

Personal information
- Date of birth: 10 January 1996 (age 30)
- Place of birth: Arish, Sinai, Egypt
- Height: 1.68 m (5 ft 6 in)
- Position: Left-back

Senior career*
Years	Team	Apps	(Gls)
2013–2017	ENPPI	20	(0)
2014-2015	→ Union Berlin (loan)	3	(0)
2016-2017	→ Al Masry (loan)	16	(1)
2017–2024	Zamalek	100	(1)
2024	Baladiyat El Mahalla SC	6	(0)

International career^{‡}
2019–2021	Egypt	5	(0)
- * Club domestic league appearances and goals as of 14 March 2026 ‡ National team caps and goals as of 14 March 2026

Abdallah Gomaa (Arabic: عبد الله جمعة; born 10 January 1996) is an Egyptian professional footballer who plays as a left-back.

== Club career ==
On 11 December 2014, it was announced that Gomaa's contract with Union Berlin had been dissolved. Club officials stated that he had shown hints of great potential, however due to language problems working with him had been difficult.

== International career ==
Gomaa made his debut for the Egypt national team on 14 October 2019 in a friendly against Botswana.

== Career statistics ==
As of 14 October 2019

Appearances and goals by national team and year
National team	Year	Apps	Goals
Egypt	2019	4	0
Total		4	0

== Honours ==
Zamalek

- Egyptian Premier League: 2020-21, 2021-22
- Egypt Cup: 2017–18, 2018–2019, 2021
- Egyptian Super Cup: 2019–20
- Saudi-Egyptian Super Cup: 2018
- CAF Confederation Cup: 2018–19
- CAF Super Cup: 2020
