= Mohamed Magdy (footballer, born 1993) =

Egyptian footballer

Mohammed Magdy
Personal information
- Full name: Mohammed Magdy
- Date of birth: 7 July 1993 (age 33)
- Place of birth: Egypt
- Position: Defender

Team information
- Current team: Ismaily SC
- Number: 2

Senior career*
Years	Team	Apps	(Gls)
–2016	Al-Masry SC	32	(6)
2016–	Zamalek SC	3	(0)
2018–	Ismaily SC	15	(1)

International career^{‡}
2016	Egypt	1	(0)
- * Club domestic league appearances and goals as of 14:11, 8 September 2017 (UTC) ‡ National team caps and goals as of 14:11, 8 September 2017 (UTC)

Mohammed Magdy (Arabic: محمد مجدي; born 7 July 1993) is an Egyptian professional footballer who plays for Zamalek SC as a defender.

== Honours ==
=== Zamalek SC ===
- Egypt Cup (1): 2017_18
