= Benson Shilongo =

Namibian footballer (born 1992)

Personal information
- Date of birth: 18 May 1992 (age 34)
- Place of birth: Ongwediva, Namibia
- Height: 1.85 m (6 ft 1 in)
- Position: Forward

Team information
- Current team: Maccabi Bnei Reineh

Senior career*
Years	Team	Apps	(Gls)
2013–2014	United Africa Tigers		
2014–2016	Gaborone United		
2016–2018	Platinum Stars	9	(4)
2018	Alassiouty Sport	2	(2)
2018–2019	Smouha	6	(3)
2019–2022	Ismaily	68	(14)
2022–	Maccabi Bnei Reineh	0	(0)

International career^{‡}
2012–	Namibia	24	(9)
- * Club domestic league appearances and goals as of 22 January 2018 ‡ National team caps and goals as of 8 September 2018

Benson Shilongo (born 18 May 1992) is a Namibian professional footballer who plays as a forward for Israeli club Maccabi Bnei Reineh and the Namibia national team.

== International career ==
=== International goals ===
Scores and results list Namibia's goal tally first.

No	Date	Venue	Opponent	Score	Result	Competition
1.	22 February 2012	Independence Stadium, Windhoek, Namibia	Mozambique	2–0	3–0	Friendly
2.	22 February 2012	Independence Stadium, Windhoek, Namibia	Mozambique	3–0	3–0	Friendly
3.	19 May 2015	Moruleng Stadium, Saulspoort, South Africa	Mauritius	1–0	2–0	2015 COSAFA Cup
4.	19 May 2015	Moruleng Stadium, Saulspoort, South Africa	Mauritius	2–0	2–0	2015 COSAFA Cup
5.	28 May 2015	Moruleng Stadium, Saulspoort, South Africa	Madagascar	1–0	3–2	2015 COSAFA Cup
6.	28 May 2015	Moruleng Stadium, Saulspoort, South Africa	Madagascar	2–2	3–2	2015 COSAFA Cup
7.	29 March 2016	Prince Louis Rwagasore Stadium, Bujumbura, Burundi	Burundi	1–0	3–1	2017 Africa Cup of Nations qualification
8.	27 March 2018	Sam Nujoma Stadium, Windhoek, Namibia	Lesotho	2–1	2–1	Friendly
9.	8 September 2018	Sam Nujoma Stadium, Windhoek, Namibia	Zambia	1–0	1–1	2019 Africa Cup of Nations qualification
