= Mahmoud Alaa =

Egyptian footballer (born 1991)

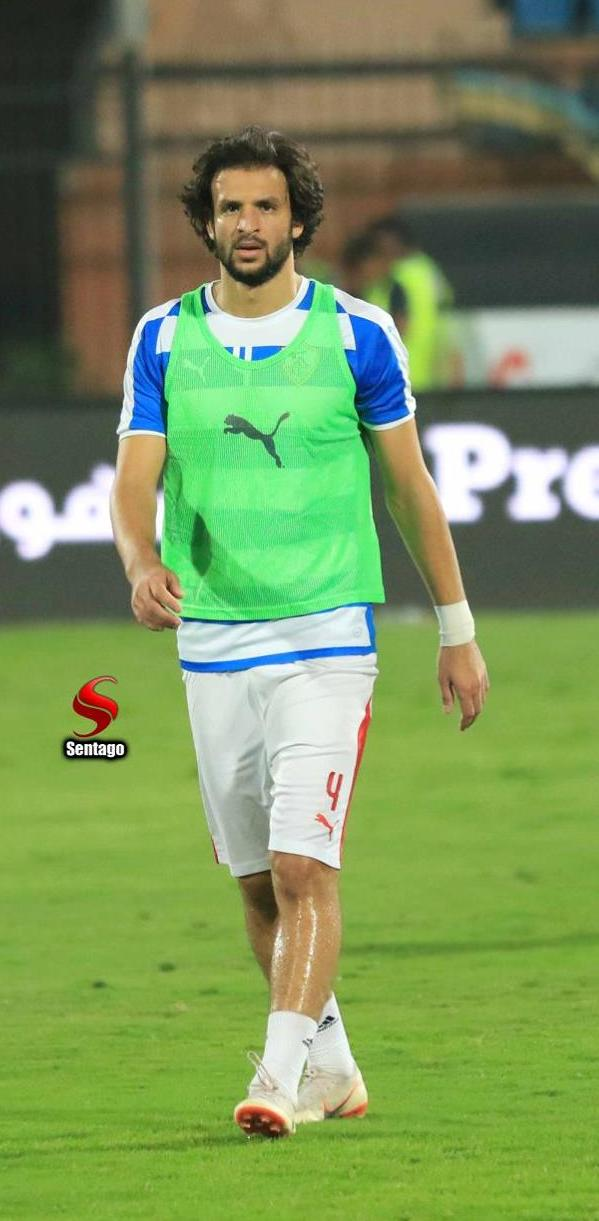
- Mahmoud Alaa with Zamalek in 2018

Personal information
- Full name: Mahmoud Alaa Eldin Mahmoud Ibrahim
- Date of birth: 28 January 1991 (age 35)
- Place of birth: Alexandria, Egypt
- Height: 1.89 m (6 ft 2 in)
- Position: Defender

Senior career*
Years	Team	Apps	(Gls)
2011–2015	Haras El Hodoud	84	(2)
2015–2017	Wadi Degla	54	(10)
2017–2024	Zamalek	119	(31)
2022–2023	→ Al Ittihad (loan)	21	(4)
2024	Asswehly	0	(0)
2024-2026	Al Ittihad	17	(4)

International career
2011	Egypt U20	1	(0)
2012	Egypt U23	7	(0)
2012–2022	Egypt	15	(0)
- * Club domestic league appearances and goals

Mahmoud Alaa Eldin Mahmoud Ibrahim (Arabic: مَحْمُود عَلَاء الدِّين مَحْمُود إِبْرَاهِيم; born 28 January 1991) is an Egyptian professional footballer who plays as a defender. He competed for the Egyptian team at the 2012 Summer Olympics.

== Honours ==
Zamalek

- Egyptian Premier League: 2020–21, 2021–22
- Egypt Cup: 2017–18, 2018–19, 2020–21
- Egyptian Super Cup: 2019
- CAF Confederation Cup: 2018–19, 2023–24
- CAF Super Cup: 2020
- Saudi-Egyptian Super Cup: 2018
