= Mahmoud Abdel Aati =

Egyptian footballer (born 1992)

Mohamed Abdel Aati
Personal information
- Full name: Mahmoud Abdel-Aati Mohamed
- Date of birth: 2 December 1992 (age 33)
- Place of birth: Egypt
- Height: 1.85 m (6 ft 1 in)
- Position: Defensive midfielder

Team information
- Current team: Al Ittihad
- Number: 26

Youth career
- 2010–2011: Nogoom El Mostakbal

Senior career*
Years	Team	Apps	(Gls)
2011	Svetkavitsa	6	(0)
2012–2015	Nogoom El Mostakbal		
2015–2016	Misr Lel-Makkasa	25	(1)
2016–2019	Zamalek	30	(0)
2019	→ Ismaily (loan)	16	(1)
2019–2021	Ismaily	44	(0)
2021–2022	Pyramids	1	(0)
2021–2022	Ismaily	21	(0)
2022–2026	Pyramids	34	(0)
2026–	Al Ittihad	2	(0)
- * Club domestic league appearances and goals as of 30 January 2026 @ 16:37(AEST)

Mahmoud Abdel-Aati Mohamed (Arabic: مَحْمُود عَبْد الْعَاطِيّ مُحَمَّد; born 2 December 1992), commonly known as Dunga, is an Egyptian footballer who plays as a midfielder for Al Ittihad.

== Honours ==
=== Club ===
Zamalek

- Egypt Cup: 2016, 2017–18
- Egyptian Super Cup: 2016
- Saudi-Egyptian Super Cup: 2018

Pyramids

- Egypt Cup: 2023–24
- CAF Champions League: 2024–25
- FIFA African–Asian–Pacific Cup: 2025
