= Osama Ibrahim =

Egyptian footballer (born 1993)

Personal information
- Full name: Osama Ibrahim Abdalla Morsi
- Date of birth: 1 April 1993 (age 33)
- Place of birth: Egypt
- Height: 1.86 m (6 ft 1 in)
- Position: Right-back

Team information
- Current team: National Bank of Egypt
- Number: 30

Youth career
- 2013–2014: ENPPI B

Senior career*
Years	Team	Apps	(Gls)
2014–2016	ENPPI	42	(3)
2016–2018	Zamalek	13	(3)
2018–2019	Smouha	0	(0)
2019–	Ismaily	5	(0)

International career^{‡}
- Egypt U20
- Egypt U23
- Egypt
- * Club domestic league appearances and goals as of 14:13, 24 October 2010 (UTC) ‡ National team caps and goals as of 14:13, 15 November 2011 (UTC)

Osama Ibrahim Abdalla Morsi (Arabic: أسامة إبراهيم عبد الله مرسي ; born on 1 April 1993) is an Egyptian footballer who plays as a right-back for Egyptian Premier League team National Bank of Egypt.

== Honours ==
=== Club ===
Zamalek

- Egypt Cup: 2016
- Egyptian Super Cup: 2017
