= 2018 Saudi-Egyptian Super Cup =

- Event: 2018 Saudi-Egyptian Super Cup

The 2018 Saudi-Egyptian Super Cup is the 3rd Saudi-Egyptian Super Cup, a football match played between the title holders of the domestic league and cup in both countries. The Egyptian Premier League winners will play against the King Cup winners, and the Saudi Professional League winners will play against the Egypt Cup winners.

== Participating teams ==
Country	Team
Egypt	Al-Ahly (2017–18 Egyptian Premier League winners)
Saudi Arabia	Al-Hilal (2017–18 Saudi Professional League winners)
Egypt	Zamalek (2017–18 Egypt Cup winners)
Saudi Arabia	Al-Ittihad (2018 King Cup winners)

== Matches ==
=== President Abdel Fattah el-Sisi's Super Cup ===
6 October 2018
20:00 AST (UTC+3)

Al-Hilal (Saudi Arabia)	1–2	(Egypt) Zamalek
Genish 57' O.G; 90+7' (Disallowed)	Report	Nagguez 40'; Kasongo 45+1'

King Saud University Stadium, Riyadh
Referee: Felix Brych (Germany)

=== King Salman's Super Cup ===
TBD
20:00 CAT (UTC+2)

Al-Ahly (Egypt)	cancelled	(Saudi Arabia) Al-Ittihad

Cairo International Stadium, Cairo
