= 2020–21 ENPPI SC season =

ENPPI SC
2020–21 season
- Manager: Helmy Toulan
- Stadium: Petrosport Stadium
- Egyptian Premier League: 6th
- Egypt Cup: Round of 16

The 2020–21 season was the 36th season in the history of the ENPPI SC, and the club's 20th consecutive season in the Egyptian Premier League. In addition to the domestic league, the team participated in the Egypt Cup.

== Competitions ==
=== Overall record ===
Competition	First match	Last match	Starting round	Final position	Record							
Competition	First match	Last match	Starting round	Final position	Pld	W	D	L	GF	GA	GD	Win %
Egyptian Premier League	11 December 2020		Matchday 1	6th	34	12	13	9	39	35	+4	35.29
Egypt Cup	11 February 2021	25 September 2021	Round of 32	Round of 16	2	1	0	1	2	2	+0	50.00
Total					36	13	13	10	41	37	+4	36.11

Source: Competitions

=== Egyptian Premier League ===
==== League table ====
Pos	Team	Pld	W	D	L	GF	GA	GD	Pts	Qualification or relegation
4	Smouha	34	12	18	4	54	41	+13	54	
5	Al Masry (Note: The 2020–21 Egyptian Premier League was not finished by the CAF deadline. As a result, the Egyptian Football Association announced that Zamalek and Al Ahly, who were at first and second place after 29 rounds respectively, will represent Egypt in the 2021–22 CAF Champions League. Meanwhile, Al Masry and Pyramids FC, who were at third and fourth place after 29 rounds respectively, will represent Egypt in the 2021–22 CAF Confederation Cup.)	34	13	11	10	44	38	+6	50	Qualification for the Confederation Cup
6	ENPPI	34	12	13	9	37	35	+2	49	
7	Al Ittihad	34	12	12	10	35	35	0	48	
8	Tala'ea El Gaish	34	10	12	12	41	37	+4	42	

Source: Soccerway
Rules for classification: 1) Points; 2) Head-to-Head points; 3) Head-to-Head goal difference; 4) Head-to-Head goals scored; 5) Head-to-Head away goals scored; 6) Goal difference; 7) Goals scored.
(Note: Head-to-head record is used only after all the matches between the teams in question have been played).

==== Results summary ====
Overall								Home						Away					
Pld	W	D	L	GF	GA	GD	Pts	W	D	L	GF	GA	GD	W	D	L	GF	GA	GD
0	0	0	0	0	0	0	0	0	0	0	0	0	0	0	0	0	0	0	0

==== Results by round ====
Round	1	2	3	4	5	6	7	8	9	10	11	12
Ground	H	A	H	A	H	A	H	A	H	A	H	A
Result	L	W	D	W	L	W	W	D	W	L	W	D
Position												

A = Away; H = Home; W = Win; D = Draw; L = Loss

==== Matches ====
The match schedule was released on 23 November 2020.

11 December 2020 1	ENPPI SC	0–1	Aswan SC	Cairo
				Stadium: Petrosport Stadium

18 December 2020 2	Misr Lel Makkasa SC	0–1	ENPPI	Cairo
				Stadium: Osman Ahmed Osman Stadium

22 December 2020 3	ENPPI	1–1	Ghazl El Mahalla	Cairo
				Stadium: Petrosport Stadium

2 January 2021 5	ENPPI	1–2	Zamalek	Cairo
				Stadium: Petrosport Stadium

8 January 2021 6	Wadi Degla	1–2	ENPPI	Cairo
				Stadium: Al Salam Stadium

15 January 2021 7	ENPPI	2–1	Ceramica Cleopatra	Cairo
				Stadium: Petrosport Stadium

24 January 2021 9	ENPPI	3–2	National Bank	Cairo
				Stadium: Petrosport Stadium

30 January 2021 10	Al Mokawloon Al Arab	2–1	ENPPI	Cairo
				Stadium: Osman Ahmed Osman Stadium

3 February 2021 11	ENPPI	3–2	Pyramids	Cairo
				Stadium: Petrosport Stadium

8 February 2021 12	Smouha	1–1	ENPPI	Alexandria
				Stadium: Alexandria Stadium

25 February 2021 8	El Entag El Harby SC	0–0	ENPPI	Cairo
				Stadium: Al Salam Stadium

1 March 2021 4	Al Ittihad	0–1	ENPPI	Alexandria
				Stadium: Alexandria Stadium

=== Egypt Cup ===
11 February 2021 Round of 32	ENPPI	2–1	Ittihad Nabarouh

25 September 2021 Round of 16	Al Ahly	1–0	ENPPI
