= 2020–21 Ghazl El Mahalla SC season =

Ghazl El Mahalla SC
2020–21 season
- Manager: Khaled Eid
- Stadium: Ghazl El Mahalla Stadium
- Egyptian Premier League: 14th
- Egypt Cup: Pre-season

The 2020–21 season was the 85th season in the history of the Ghazl El Mahalla SC, and the club's first season back in the Egyptian Premier League. In addition to the domestic league, the team participated in the Egypt Cup.

== Competitions ==
=== Overall record ===
Competition	First match	Last match	Starting round	Final position	Record							
Competition	First match	Last match	Starting round	Final position	Pld	W	D	L	GF	GA	GD	Win %
Egyptian Premier League	14 December 2020		Matchday 1	14th	34	7	14	13	28	47	−19	20.59
Egypt Cup					0	0	0	0	0	0	+0	—
Total					34	7	14	13	28	47	−19	20.59

Source: Competitions

=== Egyptian Premier League ===
==== League table ====
Pos	Team	Pld	W	D	L	GF	GA	GD	Pts	Qualification or relegation
13	Misr Lel Makkasa	34	10	8	16	36	54	−18	38	
14	National Bank of Egypt	34	6	17	11	39	44	−5	35	
15	Ghazl El Mahalla	34	7	14	13	28	41	−13	35	
16	Wadi Degla (R)	34	5	15	14	29	38	−9	30	Relegation to the Second Division
17	El Entag El Harby (R)	34	5	13	16	35	60	−25	28	Relegation to the Second Division

Source: Soccerway
Rules for classification: 1) Points; 2) Head-to-Head points; 3) Head-to-Head goal difference; 4) Head-to-Head goals scored; 5) Head-to-Head away goals scored; 6) Goal difference; 7) Goals scored.
(Note: Head-to-head record is used only after all the matches between the teams in question have been played).
(R) Relegated

==== Results summary ====
Overall								Home						Away					
Pld	W	D	L	GF	GA	GD	Pts	W	D	L	GF	GA	GD	W	D	L	GF	GA	GD
0	0	0	0	0	0	0	0	0	0	0	0	0	0	0	0	0	0	0	0

==== Results by round ====
Round	1	2	3	4	5	6	7	8	9	10	11	12
Ground	A	A	A	H	A	H	H	H	H	A	H	A
Result	D	L	D	W	L	D	D	L	D	D	W	W
Position												

A = Away; H = Home; W = Win; D = Draw; L = Loss

==== Matches ====
The match schedule was released on 23 November 2020.

14 December 2020 1	Smouha SC	1–1	Ghazl El Mahalla	Alexandria
				Stadium: Alexandria Stadium

18 December 2020 2	Al Ahly	3–0	Ghazl El Mahalla	Cairo
19:30 UTC+2				Stadium: Al Salam Stadium

22 December 2020 3	ENPPI	1–1	Ghazl El Mahalla	Cairo
				Stadium: Petrosport Stadium

25 December 2020 4	Ghazl El Mahalla	2–1	Tala'ea El Gaish	El Mahalla El Kubra
				Stadium: Ghazl El Mahalla Stadium

30 December 2020 5	Al Masry	1–0	Ghazl El Mahalla	Alexandria
				Stadium: Borg El Arab Stadium

9 January 2021 6	Ghazl El Mahalla	0–0	El Gouna	El Mahalla El Kubra
				Stadium: Ghazl El Mahalla Stadium

14 January 2021 7	Ghazl El Mahalla	1–1	Aswan	El Mahalla El Kubra
				Stadium: Ghazl El Mahalla Stadium

18 January 2021 8	Ghazl El Mahalla	1–2	Misr Lel Makkasa	El Mahalla El Kubra
				Stadium: Ghazl El Mahalla Stadium

23 January 2021 9	Ghazl El Mahalla	2–2	Ismaily	El Mahalla El Kubra
				Stadium: Ghazl El Mahalla Stadium

2 February 2021 11	Ghazl El Mahalla	2–1	Zamalek	El Mahalla El Kubra
				Stadium: Ghazl El Mahalla Stadium

7 February 2021 12	Wadi Degla	0–1	Ghazl El Mahalla	Cairo
				Stadium: Al Salam Stadium

9 March 2021 10	Al Ittihad	0–0	Ghazl El Mahalla	Alexandria
				Stadium: Alexandria Stadium

=== Egypt Cup ===
22 February 2021 Round of 32	Ceramica Cleopatra	2–0	Ghazl El Mahalla
