= 2020–21 Al Ittihad Alexandria Club season =

Al Ittihad Alexandria Club
2020–21 season
- Chairman: Mohamed Moselhi
- Manager: Hossam Hassan
- Stadium: Alexandria Stadium
- Egyptian Premier League: 7th
- Egypt Cup: Round of 16
- Top goalscorer: League: Razack Cissé (7); All: Razack Cissé (7)
- Biggest win: Misr Lel Makkasa 0–4 Al Ittihad
- Biggest defeat: Al Ahly 4–0 Al Ittihad

The 2020–21 Al Ittihad Alexandria Club season was the club's 107th season in existence and the 49th consecutive season in the top flight of Egyptian football. In addition to the domestic league, Al Ittihad participated in this season's edition of the Egypt Cup.

== Transfers ==
=== In ===
| Pos. | Player | Transferred from | Fee | Date | Source |
|---|---|---|---|---|---|
| MF | (Egypt) Hossam Ashour | (Egypt) Al Ahly | Free | 25 October 2020 | |
| MF | (Egypt) Ammar Hamdy | (Egypt) Al Ahly | Loan + €105,000 | 1 November 2020 | |
| MF | (Egypt) Semo | (Egypt) Mansoura | Undisclosed | 20 November 2020 | |
| DF | (Jamaica) Damion Lowe | (United States) Phoenix Rising | Free | 28 November 2020 | |

=== Out ===
| Pos. | Player | Transferred to | Fee | Date | Source |
|---|---|---|---|---|---|
| MF | (Egypt) Ahmed Elalfi | (Egypt) Aswan | Free | 4 January 2021 | |

== Competitions ==
=== Overall record ===
| Competition | First match | Last match | Starting round | Final position | Record | | | | | | | |
| Competition | First match | Last match | Starting round | Final position | Pld | W | D | L | GF | GA | GD | Win % |
|---|---|---|---|---|---|---|---|---|---|---|---|---|
| Egyptian Premier League | 12 December 2020 | 28 August 2021 | Matchday 1 | 7th | 34 | 12 | 12 | 10 | 35 | 35 | +0 | 35.29 |
| Egypt Cup | 14 February 2021 | 15 April 2021 | Round of 32 | Round of 16 | 2 | 1 | 0 | 1 | 2 | 2 | +0 | 50.00 |
| Total | | | | | 36 | 13 | 12 | 11 | 37 | 37 | +0 | 36.11 |

Source: Competitions

=== Egyptian Premier League ===
==== League table ====
| Pos | Team | Pld | W | D | L | GF | GA | GD | Pts | Qualification or relegation |
|---|---|---|---|---|---|---|---|---|---|---|
| 5 | Al Masry (Note: The 2020–21 Egyptian Premier League was not finished by the CAF deadline. As a result, the Egyptian Football Association announced that Zamalek and Al Ahly, who were at first and second place after 29 rounds respectively, will represent Egypt in the 2021–22 CAF Champions League. Meanwhile, Al Masry and Pyramids FC, who were at third and fourth place after 29 rounds respectively, will represent Egypt in the 2021–22 CAF Confederation Cup.) | 34 | 13 | 11 | 10 | 44 | 38 | +6 | 50 | Qualification for the Confederation Cup |
| 6 | ENPPI | 34 | 12 | 13 | 9 | 37 | 35 | +2 | 49 | |
| 7 | Al Ittihad | 34 | 12 | 12 | 10 | 35 | 35 | 0 | 48 | |
| 8 | Tala'ea El Gaish | 34 | 10 | 12 | 12 | 41 | 37 | +4 | 42 | |
| 9 | Al Mokawloon Al Arab | 34 | 11 | 8 | 15 | 37 | 45 | −8 | 41 | |

Source: Soccerway
Rules for classification: 1) Points; 2) Head-to-Head points; 3) Head-to-Head goal difference; 4) Head-to-Head goals scored; 5) Head-to-Head away goals scored; 6) Goal difference; 7) Goals scored.
(Note: Head-to-head record is used only after all the matches between the teams in question have been played).

==== Results summary ====
| Overall | | | | | | | | Home | | | | | | Away | | | | | |
| Pld | W | D | L | GF | GA | GD | Pts | W | D | L | GF | GA | GD | W | D | L | GF | GA | GD |
|---|---|---|---|---|---|---|---|---|---|---|---|---|---|---|---|---|---|---|---|
| 34 | 12 | 12 | 10 | 38 | 36 | +2 | 48 | 5 | 6 | 6 | 17 | 18 | −1 | 7 | 6 | 4 | 21 | 18 | +3 |

==== Results by round ====
| Round | 1 | 2 | 3 | 4 | 5 | 6 | 7 | 8 | 9 | 10 | 11 | 12 | 13 | 14 | 15 | 16 | 17 | 18 | 19 | 20 | 21 | 22 | 23 | 24 | 25 | 26 | 27 | 28 | 29 | 30 | 31 | 32 | 33 | 34 |
|---|---|---|---|---|---|---|---|---|---|---|---|---|---|---|---|---|---|---|---|---|---|---|---|---|---|---|---|---|---|---|---|---|---|---|
| Ground | A | H | A | H | A | H | A | H | A | H | H | A | H | A | H | A | H | H | A | H | A | H | A | H | A | H | A | A | H | A | H | A | H | A |
| Result | W | D | L | L | W | D | L | L | W | D | W | L | W | D | W | W | W | L | D | L | D | D | L | L | W | W | D | W | L | D | D | D | D | W |
| Position | 4 | 5 | 9 | 14 | 8 | 8 | 10 | 11 | 10 | 10 | 10 | 10 | 10 | 10 | 8 | 5 | 3 | 4 | 5 | 6 | 7 | 7 | 8 | 9 | 7 | 6 | 6 | 5 | 6 | 6 | 6 | 6 | 7 | 7 |

A = Away; H = Home; W = Win; D = Draw; L = Loss

==== Matches ====
The league fixtures were unveiled on 23 November 2020.

| 12 December 2020 1 | Pyramids | 1–2 | Al Ittihad |

| 18 December 2020 2 | Al Ittihad | 1–1 | Smouha |

| 28 December 2020 3 | Al Ahly | 4–0 | Al Ittihad |

| 2 January 2021 5 | Tala'ea El Gaish | 1–2 | Al Ittihad |

| 7 January 2021 6 | Al Ittihad | 1–1 | Al Masry |

| 14 January 2021 7 | El Gouna | 2–0 | Al Ittihad |

| 3 February 2021 9 | Misr Lel Makkasa | 0–4 | Al Ittihad |

| 7 February 2021 12 | Zamalek | 2–0 | Al Ittihad |

| 11 February 2021 11 | Al Ittihad | 1–0 | Ismaily |

| 17 February 2021 14 | Ceramica Cleopatra | 1–1 | Al Ittihad |

| 21 February 2021 8 | Al Ittihad | 1–3 | Aswan |

| 25 February 2021 13 | Al Ittihad | 2–1 | Wadi Degla |

| 1 March 2021 4 | Al Ittihad | 0–1 | ENPPI |

| 5 March 2021 15 | Al Ittihad | 2–0 | El Entag El Harby |

| 9 March 2021 10 | Al Ittihad | 0–0 | Ghazl El Mahalla |

| 15 March 2021 16 | National Bank | 0–1 | Al Ittihad |

| 5 April 2021 17 | Al Ittihad | 4–2 | Al Mokawloon |

| 24 April 2021 18 | Al Ittihad | 0–2 | Pyramids |

| 1 May 2021 19 | Smouha | 2–2 | Al Ittihad |

| 6 May 2021 20 | Al Ittihad | 1–2 | Al Ahly |

| 9 May 2021 21 | ENPPI | 0–0 | Al Ittihad |

| 15 May 2021 22 | Al Ittihad | 1–1 | Tala'ea El Gaish |

| 20 May 2021 23 | Al Masry | 1–0 | Al Ittihad |

| 25 May 2021 24 | Al Ittihad | 0–1 | El Gouna |

| 28 May 2021 25 | Aswan | 0–2 | Al Ittihad |

| 17 June 2021 26 | Al Ittihad | 2–1 | Misr Lel Makkasa |

| 25 June 2021 27 | Ghazl El Mahalla | 1–1 | Al Ittihad |

| 5 July 2021 28 | Ismaily | 1–2 | Al Ittihad | Ismailia |
| 19:00 UTC+2 | | Report | | Stadium: Ismailia Stadium; Referee: Ahmed El Ghandour |

| 10 August 2021 29 | Al Ittihad | 1–2 | Zamalek | Alexandria |
| 21:00 UTC+2 | | Report | | Stadium: Alexandria Stadium; Referee: Mahmoud El Banna |

| 13 August 2021 30 | Wadi Degla | 0–0 | Al Ittihad | Cairo |
| 21:00 UTC+2 | | Report | | Stadium: Al Salam Stadium; Referee: Amin Omar |

| 17 August 2021 31 | Al Ittihad | 0–0 | Ceramica Cleopatra | Alexandria |
| 19:00 UTC+2 | | Report | | Stadium: Alexandria Stadium; Referee: Mohamed Maarouf |

| 21 August 2021 32 | El Entag El Harby | 1–1 | Al Ittihad | Cairo |
| 19:00 UTC+2 | | Report | | Stadium: Al Salam Stadium; Referee: Ahmed El Adawi |

| 24 August 2021 33 | Al Ittihad | 0–0 | National Bank | Alexandria |
| 17:30 UTC+2 | | Report | | Stadium: Alexandria Stadium; Referee: Mohamed Adel |

| 28 August 2021 34 | Al Mokawloon | 1–3 | Al Ittihad | Cairo |
| 19:00 UTC+2 | | Report | | Stadium: Osman Ahmed Osman Stadium; Referee: Nader Qamar Al-Dawla |

=== Egypt Cup ===
| 14 February 2021 Round of 32 | Al Ittihad | 2–1 | Nogoom | Alexandria |
| 14:30 UTC+2 | Kamar 3' (pen.); El Deeb 89' (pen.) | | Hammam 58' | Stadium: Haras El Hodoud Stadium; Referee: Mahmoud Wafa |

| 15 April 2021 Round of 16 | Wadi Degla | 1–0 | Al Ittihad | Suez |
| 21:30 UTC+2 | Helal 58' | | | Stadium: Suez Stadium; Referee: Nader Qamar Al-Dawla |
