= 2020–21 National Bank of Egypt SC season =

National Bank of Egypt SC
2020–21 season
- Manager: Mohamed Youssef (until 17 February); Khaled Galal (from 20 February)
- Stadium: Osman Ahmed Osman Stadium
- Egyptian Premier League: 14th
- Egypt Cup: Pre-season

The 2020–21 season was the 70th season in the history of the National Bank of Egypt SC, and the club's first season ever in the Egyptian Premier League. In addition to the domestic league, the team participated in the Egypt Cup.

== Competitions ==
=== Overall record ===
Competition	First match	Last match	Starting round	Final position	Record							
Competition	First match	Last match	Starting round	Final position	Pld	W	D	L	GF	GA	GD	Win %
Egyptian Premier League	12 December 2020	27 August 2021	Matchday 1	14th	34	6	17	11	39	44	−5	17.65
Egypt Cup					0	0	0	0	0	0	+0	—
Total					34	6	17	11	39	44	−5	17.65

Source: Competitions

=== Egyptian Premier League ===
==== League table ====
Pos	Team	Pld	W	D	L	GF	GA	GD	Pts	Qualification or relegation
12	El Gouna	34	8	14	12	36	41	−5	38	
13	Misr Lel Makkasa	34	10	8	16	36	54	−18	38	
14	National Bank of Egypt	34	6	17	11	39	44	−5	35	
15	Ghazl El Mahalla	34	7	14	13	28	41	−13	35	
16	Wadi Degla (R)	34	5	15	14	29	38	−9	30	Relegation to the Second Division

Source: Soccerway
Rules for classification: 1) Points; 2) Head-to-Head points; 3) Head-to-Head goal difference; 4) Head-to-Head goals scored; 5) Head-to-Head away goals scored; 6) Goal difference; 7) Goals scored.
(Note: Head-to-head record is used only after all the matches between the teams in question have been played).
(R) Relegated

==== Results summary ====
Overall								Home						Away					
Pld	W	D	L	GF	GA	GD	Pts	W	D	L	GF	GA	GD	W	D	L	GF	GA	GD
34	6	17	11	39	44	−5	35	2	9	6	16	19	−3	4	8	5	23	25	−2

==== Results by round ====
Round	1	2	3	4	5	6	7	8	9	10	11	12
Ground	H	A	H	A	A	H	A	H	A	H	A	H
Result	D	L	W	D	L	D	D	D	L	L	D	D
Position												

A = Away; H = Home; W = Win; D = Draw; L = Loss

==== Matches ====
The match schedule was released on 23 November 2020.

12 December 2020 1	National Bank	1–1	Wadi Degla SC	Cairo
				Stadium: Police Academy Stadium

16 December 2020 2	Ceramica Cleopatra FC	3–1	National Bank	Suez
				Stadium: Suez Stadium

21 December 2020 3	National Bank	3–0	El Entag El Harby	Cairo
				Stadium: Police Academy Stadium

25 December 2020 4	Ismaily	0–0	National Bank	Ismailia
				Stadium: Ismailia Stadium

30 December 2020 5	Al Mokawloon Al Arab	2–0	National Bank	Cairo
				Stadium: Osman Ahmed Osman Stadium

8 January 2021 6	National Bank	0–0	Pyramids	Cairo
				Stadium: Police Academy Stadium

12 January 2021 7	Smouha	2–2	National Bank	Alexandria
				Stadium: Alexandria Stadium

17 January 2021 8	National Bank	0–0	Al Ahly	Alexandria
				Stadium: Haras El Hodoud Stadium

24 January 2021 9	ENPPI	3–2	National Bank	Cairo
				Stadium: Petrosport Stadium

28 January 2021 10	National Bank	0–2	Tala'ea Al Gaish	Cairo
				Stadium: Police Academy Stadium

2 February 2021 11	Al Masry	0–0	National Bank	Alexandria
				Stadium: Borg El Arab Stadium

6 February 2021 12	National Bank	1–1	El Gouna	Cairo
				Stadium: Osman Ahmed Osman Stadium

=== Egypt Cup ===
11 February 2021 Round of 32	Wadi Degla	3–1	National Bank
