= 2020–21 Ismaily SC season =

Ismaily SC
2020–21 season
- Manager: Mohamed Wahba (until 1 January); Abo Taleb El Essawi (from 1 January); Dragan Jović (from 29 January to 18 March); Ehab Galal (from 21 March)
- Stadium: Ismailia Stadium
- Egyptian Premier League: 13th
- Egypt Cup: Pre-season

The 2020–21 season was the 100th season in the history of the Ismaily SC, and the club's 51st consecutive season in the Egyptian Premier League. In addition to the domestic league, the team participated in the Egypt Cup.

== Friendlies ==
=== Pre-season ===
5 December 2020 Friendly	Ismaily (Egypt)	3–2	(Egypt) Misr Lel Makkasa	Ismailia
				Stadium: Ismailia Stadium

== Competitions ==
=== Overall record ===
Competition	First match	Last match	Starting round	Final position	Record							
Competition	First match	Last match	Starting round	Final position	Pld	W	D	L	GF	GA	GD	Win %
Egyptian Premier League	13 December 2020		Matchday 1	13th	34	10	11	13	42	44	−2	29.41
Egypt Cup	14 February 2021	27 May 2021	Round of 32	Round of 16	2	1	0	1	2	2	+0	50.00
Total					36	11	11	14	44	46	−2	30.56

Source: Competitions

=== Egyptian Premier League ===
==== League table ====
Pos	Team	Pld	W	D	L	GF	GA	GD	Pts
9	Al Mokawloon Al Arab	34	11	8	15	37	45	−8	41
10	Ceramica Cleopatra	34	8	15	11	41	46	−5	39
11	Ismaily (Note: Ismaily were deducted 3 points.)	34	10	11	13	42	44	−2	38
12	El Gouna	34	8	14	12	36	41	−5	38
13	Misr Lel Makkasa	34	10	8	16	36	54	−18	38

Source: Soccerway
Rules for classification: 1) Points; 2) Head-to-Head points; 3) Head-to-Head goal difference; 4) Head-to-Head goals scored; 5) Head-to-Head away goals scored; 6) Goal difference; 7) Goals scored.
(Note: Head-to-head record is used only after all the matches between the teams in question have been played).

==== Results summary ====
Overall								Home						Away					
Pld	W	D	L	GF	GA	GD	Pts	W	D	L	GF	GA	GD	W	D	L	GF	GA	GD
34	10	11	13	42	44	−2	41	5	5	7	20	25	−5	5	6	6	22	19	+3

==== Results by round ====
Round	1	2	3	4	5	6	7	8	9	10	11	12
Ground	A	H	A	H	A	H	A	H	A	H	A	H
Result	D	D	L	D	W	L	L	D	D	L	L	L
Position												

A = Away; H = Home; W = Win; D = Draw; L = Loss

==== Matches ====
The match schedule was released on 23 November 2020.

13 December 2020 1	Al Masry	0–0	Ismaily	Alexandria
				Stadium: Borg El Arab Stadium

17 December 2020 2	Ismaily	3–3	El Entag El Harby	Ismailia
				Stadium: Ismailia Stadium

21 December 2020 3	El Gouna	2–1	Ismaily	El Gouna
				Stadium: Khaled Bichara Stadium

25 December 2020 4	Ismaily	0–0	National Bank	Ismailia
				Stadium: Ismailia Stadium

29 December 2020 5	Aswan	0–2	Ismaily	Cairo
				Stadium: El Sekka El Hadid Stadium

3 January 2021 7	Misr Lel Makkasa	3–1	Ismaily	Cairo
				Stadium: Osman Ahmed Osman Stadium

18 January 2021 6	Ismaily	0–1	Al Mokawloon Al Arab	Ismailia
				Stadium: Ismailia Stadium

30 January 2021 8	Ismaily	1–1	Pyramids	Ismailia
				Stadium: Ismailia Stadium

23 January 2021 9	Ghazl El Mahalla	2–2	Ismaily	El Mahalla El Kubra
				Stadium: Ghazl El Mahalla Stadium

3 February 2021 10	Ismaily	0–2	Smouha	Ismailia
				Stadium: Ismailia Stadium

11 February 2021 11	Al Ittihad	1–0	Ismaily	Alexandria
				Stadium: Borg El Arab Stadium

10 March 2021 12	Ismaily	0–2	Al Ahly	Ismailia
				Stadium: Ismailia Stadium

=== Egypt Cup ===
14 February 2021 Round of 32	Ismaily	2–1	La Viena

27 May 2021 Round of 16	Zamalek	1–0	Ismaily
