= 2020–21 El Gouna FC season =

El Gouna FC
2020–21 season
- Manager: Reda Shehata
- Stadium: Khaled Bichara Stadium
- Egyptian Premier League: 12th
- Egypt Cup: Pre-season

The 2020–21 season was the 18th season in the history of the El Gouna FC, and the club's third consecutive season in the Egyptian Premier League. In addition to the domestic league, the team participated in the Egypt Cup.

== Competitions ==
=== Overall record ===
Competition	First match	Last match	Starting round	Final position	Record							
Competition	First match	Last match	Starting round	Final position	Pld	W	D	L	GF	GA	GD	Win %
Egyptian Premier League	11 December 2020		Matchday 1	12th	34	8	14	12	36	43	−7	23.53
Egypt Cup					0	0	0	0	0	0	+0	—
Total					34	8	14	12	36	43	−7	23.53

Source: Competitions

=== Egyptian Premier League ===
==== League table ====
Pos	Team	Pld	W	D	L	GF	GA	GD	Pts
10	Ceramica Cleopatra	34	8	15	11	41	46	−5	39
11	Ismaily (Note: Ismaily were deducted 3 points.)	34	10	11	13	42	44	−2	38
12	El Gouna	34	8	14	12	36	41	−5	38
13	Misr Lel Makkasa	34	10	8	16	36	54	−18	38
14	National Bank of Egypt	34	6	17	11	39	44	−5	35

Source: Soccerway
Rules for classification: 1) Points; 2) Head-to-Head points; 3) Head-to-Head goal difference; 4) Head-to-Head goals scored; 5) Head-to-Head away goals scored; 6) Goal difference; 7) Goals scored.
(Note: Head-to-head record is used only after all the matches between the teams in question have been played).

==== Results summary ====
Overall								Home						Away					
Pld	W	D	L	GF	GA	GD	Pts	W	D	L	GF	GA	GD	W	D	L	GF	GA	GD
0	0	0	0	0	0	0	0	0	0	0	0	0	0	0	0	0	0	0	0

==== Results by round ====
Round	1	2	3	4	5	6	7	8	9	10	11	12
Ground	A	H	H	A	H	A	H	A	H	A	H	A
Result	D	D	W	W	W	D	W	L	W	L	L	D
Position												

A = Away; H = Home; W = Win; D = Draw; L = Loss

==== Matches ====
The match schedule was released on 23 November 2020.

11 December 2020 1	Tala'ea El Gaish	1–1	El Gouna	Cairo
				Stadium: Gehaz El Reyada Stadium

17 December 2020 2	El Gouna	1–1	Al Masry	Alexandria
				Stadium: Borg El Arab Stadium

21 December 2020 3	El Gouna	2–1	Ismaily	El Gouna
				Stadium: Khaled Bichara Stadium

25 December 2020 4	Aswan	0–1	El Gouna	Cairo
				Stadium: El Sekka El Hadid Stadium

30 December 2020 5	El Gouna	1–0	Misr Lel Makkasa	El Gouna
				Stadium: Khaled Bichara Stadium

9 January 2021 6	Ghazl El Mahalla	0–0	El Gouna	El Mahalla El Kubra
				Stadium: Ghazl El Mahalla Stadium

14 January 2021 7	El Gouna	2–0	Al Ittihad	El Gouna
				Stadium: Khaled Bichara Stadium

19 January 2021 8	Zamalek	1–0	El Gouna	Cairo
				Stadium: Petrosport Stadium

24 January 2021 9	El Gouna	2–0	Wadi Degla	El Gouna
				Stadium: Khaled Bichara Stadium

29 January 2021 10	Ceramica Cleopatra	2–1	El Gouna	Suez
				Stadium: Suez Stadium

2 February 2021 11	El Gouna	2–3	El Entag El Harby	El Gouna
				Stadium: Khaled Bichara Stadium

6 February 2021 12	National Bank	1–1	El Gouna	Cairo
				Stadium: Osman Ahmed Osman Stadium

=== Egypt Cup ===
13 February 2021 Round of 32	El Gouna	6–1	KIMA Aswan

23 April 2021 Round of 16	Aswan	1–0	El Gouna
