= 2020–21 Smouha SC season =

Smouha SC
2020–21 season
- Manager: Ahmed Samy
- Stadium: Alexandria Stadium
- Egyptian Premier League: 4th
- Egypt Cup: Round of 16
- Top goalscorer: League: Mostafa Fathi (17); All: Mostafa Fathi (17)
- Biggest win: Smouha SC 5-0 Aswan FC
- Biggest defeat: Modern Sport FC 4-0 Smouha SC, Smouha SC 0-4 Al Ahly SC

The 2020–21 season was the 72nd season in the history of the Smouha SC, and the club's 12th consecutive season in the Egyptian Premier League. In addition to the domestic league, the team participated in the Egypt Cup.

== Competitions ==
=== Overall record ===
Competition	First match	Last match	Starting round	Final position	Record							
Competition	First match	Last match	Starting round	Final position	Pld	W	D	L	GF	GA	GD	Win %
Egyptian Premier League	14 December 2020		Matchday 1	4th	34	12	18	4	55	42	+13	35.29
Egypt Cup					0	0	0	0	0	0	+0	—
Total					34	12	18	4	55	42	+13	35.29

Source: Competitions

=== Egyptian Premier League ===
==== League table ====
Pos	Team	Pld	W	D	L	GF	GA	GD	Pts	Qualification or relegation
2	Al Ahly (Note: The 2020–21 Egyptian Premier League was not finished by the CAF deadline. As a result, the Egyptian Football Association announced that Zamalek and Al Ahly, who were at first and second place after 29 rounds respectively, will represent Egypt in the 2021–22 CAF Champions League. Meanwhile, Al Masry and Pyramids FC, who were at third and fourth place after 29 rounds respectively, will represent Egypt in the 2021–22 CAF Confederation Cup.)	34	22	10	2	72	29	+43	76	Qualification for the Champions League
3	Pyramids	34	13	16	5	51	37	+14	55	Qualification for the Confederation Cup
4	Smouha	34	12	18	4	54	41	+13	54	
5	Al Masry	34	13	11	10	44	38	+6	50	Qualification for the Confederation Cup
6	ENPPI	34	12	13	9	37	35	+2	49	

Source: Soccerway
Rules for classification: 1) Points; 2) Head-to-Head points; 3) Head-to-Head goal difference; 4) Head-to-Head goals scored; 5) Head-to-Head away goals scored; 6) Goal difference; 7) Goals scored.
(Note: Head-to-head record is used only after all the matches between the teams in question have been played).

==== Results summary ====
Overall								Home						Away					
Pld	W	D	L	GF	GA	GD	Pts	W	D	L	GF	GA	GD	W	D	L	GF	GA	GD
34	12	18	4	55	42	+13	54	5	9	3	29	26	+3	7	9	1	26	16	+10

==== Results by round ====
Round	1	2	3	4	5	6	7	8	9	10	11	12
Ground	H	A	H	A	H	A	H	A	H	A	A	H
Result	D	D	L	W	D	D	D	W	D	W	W	D
Position												

A = Away; H = Home; W = Win; D = Draw; L = Loss

==== Matches ====
The match schedule was released on 23 November 2020.

14 December 2020 1	Smouha	1–1	Ghazl El Mahalla	Alexandria
				Stadium: Alexandria Stadium

18 December 2020 2	Al Ittihad	1–1	Smouha	Alexandria
				Stadium: Alexandria Stadium

24 December 2020 4	Wadi Degla	1–2	Smouha	Cairo
				Stadium: Al Salam Stadium

28 December 2020 3	Smouha	0–2	Zamalek	Alexandria
				Stadium: Alexandria Stadium

2 January 2021 5	Smouha	0–0	Ceramica Cleopatra	Alexandria
				Stadium: Alexandria Stadium

12 January 2021 7	Smouha	2–2	National Bank	Alexandria
				Stadium: Alexandria Stadium

17 January 2021 6	El Entag El Harby	1–1	Smouha	Cairo
				Stadium: Al Salam Stadium

22 January 2021 9	Smouha	1–1	Pyramids	Alexandria
				Stadium: Alexandria Stadium

26 January 2021 8	Al Mokawloon Al Arab	1–2	Smouha	Cairo
				Stadium: Osman Ahmed Osman Stadium

3 February 2021 10	Ismaily	0–2	Smouha	Ismailia
				Stadium: Ismailia Stadium

8 February 2021 12	Smouha	1–1	ENPPI	Alexandria
				Stadium: Alexandria Stadium

21 April 2021 11	Al Ahly	1–2	Smouha	Cairo
				Stadium: Al Salam Stadium

=== Egypt Cup ===
16 February 2021 Round of 32	Smouha	4–0	Dekernes

24 September 2021 Round of 16	Smouha	1–3	Pyramids
