= 2020–21 Ceramica Cleopatra FC season =

Ceramica Cleopatra FC
2020–21 season
- Stadium: Suez Stadium
- Egyptian Premier League: 10th
- Egypt Cup: Pre-season
- Top goalscorer: League: Ahmed Yasser Rayyan (15); All: Ahmed Yasser Rayyan (15)

The 2020–21 season was the 14th season in the history of the Ceramica Cleopatra FC, and the club's first season ever in the Egyptian Premier League. In addition to the domestic league, the team participated in the Egypt Cup.

== Competitions ==
=== Overall record ===
Competition	First match	Last match	Starting round	Final position	Record							
Competition	First match	Last match	Starting round	Final position	Pld	W	D	L	GF	GA	GD	Win %
Egyptian Premier League	11 December 2020		Matchday 1	10th	34	8	15	11	41	46	−5	23.53
Egypt Cup					0	0	0	0	0	0	+0	—
Total					34	8	15	11	41	46	−5	23.53

Source: Competitions

=== Egyptian Premier League ===
==== League table ====
Pos	Team	Pld	W	D	L	GF	GA	GD	Pts
8	Tala'ea El Gaish	34	10	12	12	41	37	+4	42
9	Al Mokawloon Al Arab	34	11	8	15	37	45	−8	41
10	Ceramica Cleopatra	34	8	15	11	41	46	−5	39
11	Ismaily (Note: Ismaily were deducted 3 points.)	34	10	11	13	42	44	−2	38
12	El Gouna	34	8	14	12	36	41	−5	38

Source: Soccerway
Rules for classification: 1) Points; 2) Head-to-Head points; 3) Head-to-Head goal difference; 4) Head-to-Head goals scored; 5) Head-to-Head away goals scored; 6) Goal difference; 7) Goals scored.
(Note: Head-to-head record is used only after all the matches between the teams in question have been played).

==== Results summary ====
Overall								Home						Away					
Pld	W	D	L	GF	GA	GD	Pts	W	D	L	GF	GA	GD	W	D	L	GF	GA	GD
0	0	0	0	0	0	0	0	0	0	0	0	0	0	0	0	0	0	0	0

==== Results by round ====
Round	1	2	3	4	5	6	7	8	9	10	11	12
Ground	A	H	A	H	A	H	A	H	A	H	A	H
Result	W	W	D	L	D	L	L	W	D	W	D	D
Position												

A = Away; H = Home; W = Win; D = Draw; L = Loss

==== Matches ====
The match schedule was released on 23 November 2020.

11 December 2020 1	El Entag El Harby	0–2	Ceramica Cleopatra	Cairo
			Dabo 42' (pen.); Nabil 58'	Stadium: Al Salam Stadium

16 December 2020 2	Ceramica Cleopatra	3–1	National Bank	Suez
				Stadium: Suez Stadium

27 December 2020 4	Ceramica Cleopatra	0–1	Pyramids	Suez
				Stadium: Suez Stadium

2 January 2021 5	Smouha	0–0	Ceramica Cleopatra	Alexandria
				Stadium: Alexandria Stadium

8 January 2021 6	Ceramica Cleopatra	0–2	Al Ahly	Suez
19:30 UTC+2				Stadium: Suez Stadium

12 January 2021 3	Al Mokawloon Al Arab	1–1	Ceramica Cleopatra	Cairo
				Stadium: Osman Ahmed Osman Stadium

15 January 2021 7	ENPPI	2–1	Ceramica Cleopatra	Cairo
				Stadium: Petrosport Stadium

18 January 2021 8	Ceramica Cleopatra	2–1	Tala'ea El Gaish	Suez
				Stadium: Suez Stadium

29 January 2021 10	Ceramica Cleopatra	2–1	El Gouna	Suez
				Stadium: Suez Stadium

2 February 2021 11	Aswan	1–1	Ceramica Cleopatra	Cairo
				Stadium: Petrosport Stadium

8 February 2021 12	Ceramica Cleopatra	1–1	Misr Lel Makkasa	Suez
				Stadium: Suez Stadium

26 February 2021 9	Al Masry	2–2	Ceramica Cleopatra	Alexandria
				Stadium: Borg El Arab Stadium

=== Egypt Cup ===
22 February 2021 Round of 32	Ceramica Cleopatra	2–0	Ghazl El Mahalla SC

20 April 2021 Round of 16	Misr Lel Makkasa	2–1	Ceramica Cleopatra
