= 2020–21 Al Masry SC season =

Al Masry SC
2020–21 season
- Stadium: Borg El Arab Stadium (neutral)
- Egyptian Premier League: 5th
- Egypt Cup: Quarter-finals
- Top goalscorer: League: Omar Kamal (13); All: Omar Kamal (13)

The 2020–21 season was the 101st season in the history of the Al Masry SC, and the club's ninth consecutive season in the Egyptian Premier League. In addition to the domestic league, the team participated in the Egypt Cup.

== Competitions ==
=== Overall record ===
Competition	First match	Last match	Starting round	Final position	Record							
Competition	First match	Last match	Starting round	Final position	Pld	W	D	L	GF	GA	GD	Win %
Egyptian Premier League	13 December 2020		Matchday 1	5th	34	13	11	10	44	38	+6	38.24
Egypt Cup					0	0	0	0	0	0	+0	—
Total					34	13	11	10	44	38	+6	38.24

Source: Competitions

=== Egyptian Premier League ===
==== League table ====
Pos	Team	Pld	W	D	L	GF	GA	GD	Pts	Qualification or relegation
3	Pyramids (Note: The 2020–21 Egyptian Premier League was not finished by the CAF deadline. As a result, the Egyptian Football Association announced that Zamalek and Al Ahly, who were at first and second place after 29 rounds respectively, will represent Egypt in the 2021–22 CAF Champions League. Meanwhile, Al Masry and Pyramids FC, who were at third and fourth place after 29 rounds respectively, will represent Egypt in the 2021–22 CAF Confederation Cup.)	34	13	16	5	51	37	+14	55	Qualification for the Confederation Cup
4	Smouha	34	12	18	4	54	41	+13	54	
5	Al Masry	34	13	11	10	44	38	+6	50	Qualification for the Confederation Cup
6	ENPPI	34	12	13	9	37	35	+2	49	
7	Al Ittihad	34	12	12	10	35	35	0	48	

Source: Soccerway
Rules for classification: 1) Points; 2) Head-to-Head points; 3) Head-to-Head goal difference; 4) Head-to-Head goals scored; 5) Head-to-Head away goals scored; 6) Goal difference; 7) Goals scored.
(Note: Head-to-head record is used only after all the matches between the teams in question have been played).

==== Results summary ====
Overall								Home						Away					
Pld	W	D	L	GF	GA	GD	Pts	W	D	L	GF	GA	GD	W	D	L	GF	GA	GD
0	0	0	0	0	0	0	0	0	0	0	0	0	0	0	0	0	0	0	0

==== Results by round ====
Round	1	2	3	4	5	6	7	8	9	10	11	12
Ground	H	A	H	A	H	A	H	A	H	A	H	A
Result	D	D	W	D	W	D	L	W	D	W	D	W
Position												

A = Away; H = Home; W = Win; D = Draw; L = Loss

==== Matches ====
The match schedule was released on 23 November 2020.

13 December 2020 1	Al Masry	0–0	Ismaily SC	Alexandria
				Stadium: Borg El Arab Stadium

17 December 2020 2	El Gouna FC	1–1	Al Masry	Alexandria
				Stadium: Borg El Arab Stadium

21 December 2020 3	Al Masry	3–0	Aswan	Alexandria
				Stadium: Borg El Arab Stadium

26 December 2020 4	Misr Lel Makkasa	1–1	Al Masry	Alexandria
				Stadium: Borg El Arab Stadium

30 December 2020 5	Al Masry	1–0	Ghazl El Mahalla	Alexandria
				Stadium: Borg El Arab Stadium

7 January 2021 6	Al Ittihad	1–1	Al Masry	Alexandria
				Stadium: Borg El Arab Stadium

12 January 2021 7	Al Masry	0–1	Zamalek	Alexandria
17:00 UTC+2			Ashour 54'	Stadium: Borg El Arab Stadium

20 January 2021 8	Wadi Degla	1–3	Al Masry	Alexandria
				Stadium: Borg El Arab Stadium

29 January 2021 10	El Entag El Harby	0–3	Al Masry	Alexandria
				Stadium: Borg El Arab Stadium

2 February 2021 11	Al Masry	0–0	National Bank	Alexandria
				Stadium: Borg El Arab Stadium

6 February 2021 12	Al Mokawloon Al Arab	0–1	Al Masry	Alexandria
				Stadium: Borg El Arab Stadium

26 February 2021 9	Al Masry	2–2	Ceramica Cleopatra	Alexandria
				Stadium: Borg El Arab Stadium

=== Egypt Cup ===
15 February 2021 Round of 32	Al Masry	3–0	El Mansoura SC

15 April 2021 Round of 16	Al Masry	3–1	Tala'ea El Gaish

31 May 2021 Quarter-finals	Aswan	2–2 (a.e.t.) (5–4 p)	Al Masry	Alexandria
				Stadium: Alexandria Stadium
