= 2020–21 Al Mokawloon Al Arab SC season =

Al Mokawloon Al Arab SC
2020–21 season
- Manager: Emad El Nahhas
- Stadium: Osman Ahmed Osman Stadium
- Egyptian Premier League: 9th
- Egypt Cup: Pre-season

The 2020–21 season was the 48th season in the history of the Al Mokawloon Al Arab SC, and the club's 16th consecutive season in the Egyptian Premier League. In addition to the domestic league, the team participated in the Egypt Cup.

== Competitions ==
=== Overall record ===
Competition	First match	Last match	Starting round	Final position	Record							
Competition	First match	Last match	Starting round	Final position	Pld	W	D	L	GF	GA	GD	Win %
Egyptian Premier League	12 December 2020		Matchday 1	9th	34	11	8	15	38	48	−10	32.35
Egypt Cup					0	0	0	0	0	0	+0	—
Total					34	11	8	15	38	48	−10	32.35

Source: Competitions

=== Egyptian Premier League ===
==== League table ====
Pos	Team	Pld	W	D	L	GF	GA	GD	Pts
7	Al Ittihad	34	12	12	10	35	35	0	48
8	Tala'ea El Gaish	34	10	12	12	41	37	+4	42
9	Al Mokawloon Al Arab	34	11	8	15	37	45	−8	41
10	Ceramica Cleopatra	34	8	15	11	41	46	−5	39
11	Ismaily (Note: Ismaily were deducted 3 points.)	34	10	11	13	42	44	−2	38

Source: Soccerway
Rules for classification: 1) Points; 2) Head-to-Head points; 3) Head-to-Head goal difference; 4) Head-to-Head goals scored; 5) Head-to-Head away goals scored; 6) Goal difference; 7) Goals scored.
(Note: Head-to-head record is used only after all the matches between the teams in question have been played).

==== Results summary ====
Overall								Home						Away					
Pld	W	D	L	GF	GA	GD	Pts	W	D	L	GF	GA	GD	W	D	L	GF	GA	GD
0	0	0	0	0	0	0	0	0	0	0	0	0	0	0	0	0	0	0	0

==== Results by round ====
Round	1	2	3	4	5	6	7	8	9	10	11	12
Ground	H	A	H	A	H	A	A	H	A	H	A	H
Result	L	L	D	L	W	W	L	L	L	W	D	L
Position												

A = Away; H = Home; W = Win; D = Draw; L = Loss

==== Matches ====
The match schedule was released on 23 November 2020.

12 December 2020 1	Al Mokawloon Al Arab	0–2	Zamalek SC	Cairo
				Stadium: Cairo Military Academy Stadium

16 December 2020 2	Wadi Degla SC	2–1	Al Mokawloon Al Arab SC	Cairo
				Stadium: Al Salam Stadium

26 December 2020 4	El Entag El Harby	1–0	Al Mokawloon Al Arab	Cairo
				Stadium: Al Salam Stadium

30 December 2020 5	Al Mokawloon Al Arab	2–0	National Bank	Cairo
				Stadium: Osman Ahmed Osman Stadium

12 January 2021 3	Al Mokawloon Al Arab	1–1	Ceramica Cleopatra	Cairo
				Stadium: Osman Ahmed Osman Stadium

15 January 2021 7	Pyramids	3–1	Al Mokawloon Al Arab	Cairo
				Stadium: 30 June Stadium

18 January 2021 6	Ismaily	0–1	Al Mokawloon Al Arab	Ismailia
				Stadium: Ismailia Stadium

21 January 2021 9	Al Ahly	3–2	Al Mokawloon Al Arab	Cairo
				Stadium: Al Salam Stadium

26 January 2021 8	Al Mokawloon Al Arab	1–2	Smouha	Cairo
				Stadium: Osman Ahmed Osman Stadium

30 January 2021 10	Al Mokawloon Al Arab	2–1	ENPPI	Cairo
				Stadium: Osman Ahmed Osman Stadium

3 February 2021 11	Tala'ea El Gaish	1–1	Al Mokawloon Al Arab	Cairo
				Stadium: Gehaz El Reyada Stadium

6 February 2021 12	Al Mokawloon Al Arab	0–1	Al Masry	Alexandria
				Stadium: Borg El Arab Stadium

=== Egypt Cup ===
13 February 2021 Round of 32	Al Mokawloon Al Arab	1–3	Petrojet SC
