= 2020–21 El Entag El Harby SC season =

El Entag El Harby SC
2020–21 season
- Stadium: Al Salam Stadium
- Egyptian Premier League: 17th (relegated)
- Egypt Cup: Pre-season

The 2020–21 season was the 17th season in the history of the El Entag El Harby SC, and the club's sixth consecutive season in the Egyptian Premier League. In addition to the domestic league, the team participated in the Egypt Cup.

== Competitions ==
=== Overall record ===
Competition	First match	Last match	Starting round	Final position	Record							
Competition	First match	Last match	Starting round	Final position	Pld	W	D	L	GF	GA	GD	Win %
Egyptian Premier League	11 December 2020		Matchday 1	17th	34	5	13	16	37	62	−25	14.71
Egypt Cup					0	0	0	0	0	0	+0	—
Total					34	5	13	16	37	62	−25	14.71

Source: Competitions

=== Egyptian Premier League ===
==== League table ====
Pos	Team	Pld	W	D	L	GF	GA	GD	Pts	Qualification or relegation
14	National Bank of Egypt	34	6	17	11	39	44	−5	35	
15	Ghazl El Mahalla	34	7	14	13	28	41	−13	35	
16	Wadi Degla (R)	34	5	15	14	29	38	−9	30	Relegation to the Second Division
17	El Entag El Harby (R)	34	5	13	16	35	60	−25	28	Relegation to the Second Division
18	Aswan (R)	34	6	9	19	29	61	−32	27	Relegation to the Second Division

Source: Soccerway
Rules for classification: 1) Points; 2) Head-to-Head points; 3) Head-to-Head goal difference; 4) Head-to-Head goals scored; 5) Head-to-Head away goals scored; 6) Goal difference; 7) Goals scored.
(Note: Head-to-head record is used only after all the matches between the teams in question have been played).
(R) Relegated

==== Results summary ====
Overall								Home						Away					
Pld	W	D	L	GF	GA	GD	Pts	W	D	L	GF	GA	GD	W	D	L	GF	GA	GD
0	0	0	0	0	0	0	0	0	0	0	0	0	0	0	0	0	0	0	0

==== Results by round ====
Round	1	2	3	4	5	6	7	8	9	10	11	12
Ground	H	A	A	H	A	H	A	H	A	H	A	H
Result	L	D	L	W	L	D	L	D	L	L	W	D
Position												

A = Away; H = Home; W = Win; D = Draw; L = Loss

==== Matches ====
The match schedule was released on 23 November 2020.

11 December 2020 1	El Entag El Harby SC	0–2	Ceramica Cleopatra	Cairo
				Stadium: Al Salam Stadium

17 December 2020 2	Ismaily	3–3	El Entag El Harby	Ismailia
				Stadium: Ismailia Stadium

21 December 2020 3	National Bank	3–0	El Entag El Harby	Cairo
				Stadium: Police Academy Stadium

26 December 2020 4	El Entag El Harby SC	1–0	Al Mokawloon Al Arab	Cairo
				Stadium: Al Salam Stadium

1 January 2021 5	Pyramids	3–2	El Entag El Harby	Cairo
				Stadium: 30 June Stadium

12 January 2021 7	Al Ahly	4–1	El Entag El Harby	Cairo
19:30 UTC+3	Maâloul 48'; El Shahat 69'; Soliman 77', 86'		Morsy 84'	Stadium: Al Salam Stadium

17 January 2021 6	El Entag El Harby SC	1–1	Smouha	Cairo
				Stadium: Al Salam Stadium

22 January 2021 9	Tala'ea El Gaish	3–0	El Entag El Harby	Cairo
				Stadium: Gehaz El Reyada Stadium

29 January 2021 10	El Entag El Harby	0–3	Al Masry	Alexandria
				Stadium: Borg El Arab Stadium

2 February 2021 11	El Gouna	2–3	El Entag El Harby	El Gouna
				Stadium: Khaled Bichara Stadium

6 February 2021 12	El Entag El Harby SC	1–1	Aswan	Cairo
				Stadium: Al Salam Stadium

25 February 2021 8	El Entag El Harby SC	0–0	ENPPI	Cairo
				Stadium: Al Salam Stadium

=== Egypt Cup ===
14 February 2021 Round of 32	El Entag El Harby	0–1	Coca-Cola FC
