= 2020–21 Egypt Cup qualifying rounds =

Tournament details
- Country: Egypt
- Date: 12 January – 6 February 2021

Tournament statistics
- Matches played: 142
- Goals scored: 337 (2.37 per match)

The 2020–21 Egypt Cup qualifying rounds open the 89th season of the competition in Egypt, the oldest association football single knockout competition in Africa.

A large number of clubs did not enter the competition due to various reasons, mainly due to the COVID-19 pandemic in Egypt, alongside other reasons such as financial status. Only 156 clubs registered to participate in this season's qualifying rounds, 74 less than the previous season. This led the Egyptian Football Association to reduce the number of the qualifying rounds to four rounds only instead of five, with participating teams from the 2020–21 Egyptian Second Division entering at the second preliminary round instead of the third.

== Calendar ==
The calendar for the 2020–21 Egypt Cup qualifying rounds, as announced by the Egyptian Football Association.

Round	Date	Number of Fixtures	Byes	Clubs Remaining	New Entries This Round
First Preliminary Round	12–13 January 2021	55	2 (Note: Only 1 team was initially supposed to receive a bye for the first preliminary round. However, following the draw for this round, it was revealed that Akhmim (a team from the Egyptian Third Division) was not included in the draw pots due to a registration error, despite the club paying the entrance fee to participate in the Egypt Cup. As a result, the Egyptian Football Association allowed Akmim to enter the competition from the second preliminary round, thus giving it a bye for the previous round.)	174 → 119	112; teams playing in the Egyptian Third Division and the Egyptian Fourth Division
Second Preliminary Round	17–26 January 2021	45	11	119 → 74	44; teams playing in the Egyptian Second Division
Third Preliminary Round	31 January – 2 February 2021	28	none	74 → 46	none
Fourth Preliminary Round	5–6 February 2021	14	none	46 → 32	none

== First Preliminary Round ==
The First Preliminary Round fixtures were played on 12 and 13 January 2021. A total of 112 teams from the Egyptian Third Division and the Egyptian Fourth Division entered at this stage of the competition. The results were as follows:

Tie	Home Team	Score	Away Team
12 January 2021
1	Al Nasr Lel Taa'den	1–1 (2–3 p)	Al Madina Al Monawara
2	MS El Zahraa	4–1	Muslim Youths (Esna)
3	Al Maragha	2–1	Workers (Ras Gharib)
4	Ras Gharib	5–0	Qeft
6	Abou Tig	2–0	Al Badari
7	Muslim Youths (Asyut)	0–3	El Qouseiya
9	MS Nasser Malawy	1–2	Beni Mazar
10	Tutankhamun	1–0	Matar Taris
11	Al Wasta	2–2 (3–2 p)	MS Snouras
12	MS Abou Kasah	0–8	La Viena
13	Bahtim	1–1 (5–4 p)	El Said (Giza)
14	MS Toukh	1–0	Guinness
15	Misr Insurance	3–0	MS Al Amiriya
16	Shabab El Basatin	1–3	Al Marag
17	Al Maady & Al Yacht	1–1 (4–5 p)	HCHD
18	El Ayat	4–2	Banha
19	Toshka	2–2 (1–3 p)	Helioplis
20	6th of October City	5–4	Esco
21	Al Ghaba	2–2 (3–4 p)	Telecom Egypt
22	SCE	1–3	NFP
23	Helwan El A'am	1–2	Al Obour (El Qalyubia)
24	El Qawmi	2–2 (5–4 p)	MS El Saf
25	Ittihad El Shorta	0–1	El Shams
26	Pyramids Gardens	4–2	Plastic Shubra El Kheima
27	MS Sol	0–2	Goldi
28	Egyptian Lawyers	3–1	Golden Asmarat
29	Menouf	0–0 (5–4 p)	Ittihad Bassioun
30	Ghazl Shebin	2–0	MS Tala
31	Mit Khalf	1–1 (5–4 p)	Sporting Castle
32	Ashmoun	1–1 (5–4 p)	Samanoud
33	Arab El Raml	0–3	El Said (El Mahalla)
34	MS Minyat Samanoud	0–0 (4–2 p)	DKWASC
35	Workers (El Mansoura)	2–2 (3–4 p)	MS Sidi Ghazi
36	MS Bedway	2–2 (7–6 p)	El Senbellawein
37	Ittihad Al Manzalah	0–1	Ittihad Nabarouh
38	MS El Hanafy	0–2	Baltim
39	Sidi Salem	1–1 (4–5 p)	Belkas
40	Al Hamoul	3–0	MS Al Amir
41	Kahraba Talkha	2–0	Sherbeen
42	Sheko	0–2	Mega Sport
43	Koum Hamada	3–1	El Gamarek
44	El Magd	3–1	Badr
45	Delphi	1–1 (4–5 p)	BWADC
46	Alexandria Petroleum	0–0 (4–5 p)	El Beheira Proxy Work
47	Horse Owners	0–0 (5–4 p)	Tala'ea El Ostoul
48	Al Hilal (El Daba'a)	0–0 (5–4 p)	El Horreya
49	Matrouh	1–3	Al Masry (Al Saloum)
50	Kahraba Ismailia	7–0	South Sinai
52	Port Fouad	0–0 (4–5 p)	Manshiyat El Shohada
53	Ras El Bar	2–1	Al Rebat & Al Anwar
54	Ghazl Damietta	0–1	El Sharkia
55	Al Nasr (Arish)	0–1	Sinai Star
13 January 2021
5	Shoban Al Maragha	0–0 (10–11 p)	Al Ahly (El Monshah)
8	Malawy	1–0	MS Maghagha
51	Damietta	4–0	Abou Kebir

The following team(s) received a bye for this round:

- Akhmim
- Nasser El Fekreia

== Second Preliminary Round ==
The Second Preliminary Round fixtures were played between 17 and 26 January 2021. A total of 44 teams from the Egyptian Second Division entered at this stage of the competition. The results were as follows:

Tie	Home Team	Score	Away Team
17 January 2021
36	Sporting Alexandria	0–0 (6–7 p)	Pharco
37	Al Jazeera	1–0	Al Hilal (El Daba'a)
18 January 2021
16	ZED	1–1 (3–1 p)	Tersana
17	Helioplis	1–3	El Sekka El Hadid
19	Coca-Cola	2–0	Bahtim
20	Gomhoriat Shebin	5–1	El Ayat
21	Nogoom	3–1	Mit Khalf
23	Sers El Layan	0–0 (3–4 p)	Misr Insurance
24	El Shams	0–1	Al Nasr
27	Ala'ab Damanhour	1–1 (4–5 p)	El Beheira Proxy Work
29	Tanta	3–3 (4–3 p)	BWADC
30	Mega Sport	0–0 (1–4 p)	Biyala
31	El Said (El Mahalla)	0–0 (2–4 p)	Dikernis
32	Baladeyet El Mahalla	2–0	Beni Ebeid
34	MS Minyat Samanoud	3–2	Kafr El Sheikh
35	Belkas	1–1 (3–4 p)	El Mansoura
38	El Magd	1–5	Haras El Hodoud
39	Horse Owners	1–3	Abou Qir Fertilizers
43	Damietta	0–0 (4–2 p)	Suez
45	Petrojet	3–0	Al Zarka
19 January 2021
1	Al Aluminium	2–0	Al Ahly (El Monshah)
2	Al Maragha	1–1 (3–2 p)	Al Madina Al Monawara
3	KIMA Aswan	3–0	MS El Zahraa
4	Tahta	2–1	Ras Gharib
5	Sohag	3–0	Qena
6	Telephonat Beni Suef	1–0	Beni Suef
7	El Minya	3–2	Akhmim
8	El Qouseiya	2–2 (3–2 p)	Dayrout
9	Al Wasta	0–1	La Viena
10	Abou Tig	1–0	Faiyum
11	Tutankhamun	1–1 (3–2 p)	Nasser El Fekreia
12	Asyut Cement	0–3	Asyut Petroleum
13	Ghazl Shebin	3–0	MS Toukh
14	Telecom Egypt	0–1	Al Obour (El Qalyubia)
15	El Qawmi	5–0	Egyptian Lawyers
18	Eastern Company	3–1	Al Marag
22	Goldi	2–0	Menouf
25	NFP	2–0	6th of October City
26	Media	0–0 (4–5 p)	Pyramids Gardens
33	Kahraba Talkha	0–0 (4–5 p)	Koum Hamada
40	Al Masry (Al Saloum)	2–3	Olympic Club
41	Al Merreikh	1–1 (2–1 p)	Kahraba Ismailia
42	Ras El Bar	2–1	Sinai Star
44	El Sharkia	1–1 (3–4 p)	Manshiyat El Shohada
26 January 2021
28	MS Sidi Ghazi	1–0 (Note: The MS Sidi Ghazi v Baltim match, originally scheduled to be played on 19 January 2021, was postponed due to security concerns. The match was later rescheduled to be played on 26 January 2021.)	Baltim

The following team(s) received a bye for this round:

- Ashmoun
- Beni Mazar
- El Dakhleya
- Al Hammam
- Al Hamoul
- HCHD
- Ittihad Nabarouh
- Malawy
- MS Bedway
- Porto Suez
- El Qanah

== Third Preliminary Round ==
The Third Preliminary Round fixtures were played between 31 January and 2 February 2021. The results were as follows:

Tie	Home Team	Score	Away Team
31 January 2021
23	Pharco	1–0	Al Jazeera
1 February 2021
6	La Viena	1–0	Abou Tig
19	Biyala	0–2	Dikernis
20	Baladeyet El Mahalla	1–1 (5–4 p)	Koum Hamada
24	Haras El Hodoud	1–0	Abou Qir Fertilizers
25	Olympic Club	0–1	El Qanah
28	Petrojet	2–1	Porto Suez
2 February 2021
1	Al Aluminium	2–0	Al Maragha
2	KIMA Aswan	2–1	Tahta
3	Sohag	2–1	Beni Mazar
4	Telephonat Beni Suef	0–0 (4–2 p)	El Minya
5	El Qouseiya	1–2	Malawy
7	Tutankhamun	0–0 (4–5 p)	Asyut Petroleum
8	Ghazl Shebin	0–0 (3–4 p)	Ashmoun
9	Al Obour (El Qalyubia)	1–0	El Qawmi
10	ZED	1–1 (3–4 p)	El Dakhleya
11	El Sekka El Hadid	2–0	Eastern Company
12	Coca-Cola	0–0 (4–3 p)	Gomhoriat Shebin
13	HCHD	1–3	Nogoom
14	Goldi	0–1	Misr Insurance
15	Al Nasr	3–2	NFP
16	Pyramids Gardens	2–2 (4–5 p)	MS Bedway
17	El Beheira Proxy Work	0–3	MS Sidi Ghazi
18	Tanta	1–2	Ittihad Nabarouh
21	MS Minyat Samanoud	1–1 (2–3 p)	Al Hamoul
22	El Mansoura	0–0 (4–2 p)	Al Hammam
26	Al Merreikh	1–0	Ras El Bar
27	Damietta	0–0 (5–6 p)	Manshiyat El Shohada

== Fourth Preliminary Round ==
The Fourth Preliminary Round fixtures were played on 5 and 6 February 2021. The results were as follows:

Tie	Home Team	Score	Away Team
5 February 2021
1	Al Aluminium	1–2	KIMA Aswan
2	Sohag	1–0	Telephonat Beni Suef
3	Malawy	1–1 (2–3 p)	La Viena
5	Al Obour (El Qalyubia)	1–1 (4–3 p)	El Dakhleya
6	El Sekka El Hadid	0–0 (7–8 p)	Coca-Cola
7	Nogoom	0–0 (8–7 p)	Misr Insurance
8	Al Nasr	5–0	MS Bedway
10	Dikernis	0–0 (5–4 p)	Baladeyet El Mahalla
11	Al Hamoul	0–2	El Mansoura
12	Pharco	0–0 (3–4 p)	Haras El Hodoud
13	El Qanah	1–1 (4–2 p)	Al Merreikh
14	Manshiyat El Shohada	1–1 (4–5 p)	Petrojet
6 February 2021
4	Asyut Petroleum	0–0 (2–4 p)	Ashmoun
9	MS Sidi Ghazi	0–3	Ittihad Nabarouh

== Competition proper ==
Winners from the Fourth Preliminary Round advanced to the Round of 32, where teams from the Egyptian Premier League will enter the competition.
