= Mohamed Fathallah (footballer) =

Egyptian footballer (born 1993)

Personal information
- Full name: Mohamed Fathallah Gomaa Abdelkader El-Ramal
- Date of birth: 15 June 1993 (age 33)
- Place of birth: Egypt
- Height: 1.84 m (6 ft 0 in)
- Position: Defender

Team information
- Current team: Tala'ea El Gaish
- Number: 5

Senior career*
Years	Team	Apps	(Gls)
2016–2017	Misr Insurance		
2017–2019	Gomhoriat Shebin		
2019–2023	Ghazl El Mahalla	56	(1)
2022–2023	→ Tala'ea El Gaish (loan)	33	(1)
2023–	Tala'ea El Gaish	10	(2)
2024	→ Al-Jandal (loan)	17	(0)
- * Club domestic league appearances and goals as of 23:14, 23 December 2021 (UTC) ‡ National team caps and goals as of 23:14, 23 December 2021 (UTC)

Mohamed Fathallah Gomaa Abdelkader El-Ramal (Arabic: مُحَمَّد فَتح اللَّه جُمعَة عَبد الْقَادِر الرَّمَال; born 15 June 1993) is an Egyptian professional footballer who plays as a defender for Tala'ea El Gaish.

On 20 January 2024, Fathallah joined Saudi First Division club Al-Jandal on a six-month loan.

== Career statistics ==
=== Club ===
As of 23 December 2021.

Club	Season	League			Cup		Continental		Other		Total	
Club	Season	Division	Apps	Goals	Apps	Goals	Apps	Goals	Apps	Goals	Apps	Goals
Ghazl El Mahalla	2020–21	Egyptian Premier League	33	0	1 (Note: Appearances in the Egyptian Cup)	0	0	0	0	0	34	0
Ghazl El Mahalla	2021–22	Egyptian Premier League	7	0	0	0	0	0	0	0	7	0
Career total			40	0	1	0	0	0	0	0	41	0
