= Mohamed Azima =

Egyptian footballer (born 1968)

Personal information
- Full name: Mohamed Semida
- Date of birth: 17 October 1968 (age 58)
- Place of birth: Egypt
- Height: 1.81 m (5 ft 11 in)
- Position: Midfielder

Senior career*
Years	Team	Apps	(Gls)
1987–1990	Al-Ahly		
1990–1993	Fortuna Köln	26	(3)
1993–1993	VfB Oldenburg	9	(0)
1993–1994	Arminia Bielefeld	9	(1)
1994–1996	Vorwärts Steyr	45	(5)
1996–1996	Ulsan Hyundai Horang-i	13	(1)
1996–1998	FC 08 Homburg	28	(4)
1998–1999	SC Pfullendorf	25	(4)

International career
1987–1995	Egypt	21	(?)
- * Club domestic league appearances and goals

Mohamed Semida Abdel Azim (Arabic: محمد عبد العظيم عثمان صميدة), commonly known as Mohamed Azima (محمد عظيمة), (born 17 October 1968) is a former Egypt international football midfielder who played for clubs in Egypt, Germany, Austria and South Korea.

== Career ==
Born in Egypt, Azima began playing football for local side Al-Ahly S.C.

In 1990, Azima moved to Germany to sign for 2. Bundesliga side SC Fortuna Köln. He would make 35 appearances in the German second division, the last nine with VfB Oldenburg.

Azima moved to Austria where he would play for SK Vorwärts Steyr, and won the 1996 K-League championship in South Korea with Ulsan Hyundai Horang-i.

Azima made several appearances for the Egypt national football team, and played at the 1992 African Cup of Nations finals.
