= Saafan El-Sagheer =

Egyptian footballer (born 1968)

Personal information
- Date of birth: 7 January 1968 (age 58)
- Position: Goalkeeper

Team information
- Current team: Egypt (goalkeeping coach)

Senior career*
Years	Team	Apps	(Gls)
1988–1999	Ismaily SC		

International career
1991–1994	Egypt	2	(0)

Managerial career
- 2020–2021: Ismaily SC
- 2024-: Egypt
- * Club domestic league appearances and goals

Saafan El-Sagheer (born 7 January 1968) is a retired Egyptian football goalkeeper who played for the national team. He was a squad member for the 1992 and 1994 African Cup of Nations. El-Sagheer is the current goalkeeping coach of the Egypt national football team.

On 7 July 2026, while working as a technical staff member of Egypt at the 2026 FIFA World Cup, El-Sagheer was shown a red card by French referee François Letexier in the 94th minute of the round of 16 match against Argentina, after he complained about several of Letexier's decisions.
