= Khaled Eid =

Egyptian football manager (born 1964)

Personal information
- Date of birth: 29 March 1964 (age 62)
- Place of birth: Mahalla, Egypt
- Position: Midfielder

Team information
- Current team: El Mahalla (manager)

Senior career*
Years	Team	Apps	(Gls)
1984–1997	El Mahalla		

International career
1988–1992	Egypt	14	(2)

Managerial career
- 2010: Fujairah
- 2014: El Raja
- 2014: Al Assiouty Sport
- 2016–2017: Tanta
- 2018–2021: El Mahalla
- 2022–2023: Tersana
- 2023–: El Mahalla
- * Club domestic league appearances and goals

Khaled Eid (born 29 March 1964) is a retired Egyptian football midfielder and later manager. He was a squad member for the 1992 African Cup of Nations.
