= El Sekka El Hadid Stadium =

Football stadium in Egypt

Coordinates: 30°03′20″N 31°18′15″E

- ستاد السكة الحديد
- Interactive map of El Sekka El Hadid Stadium
- Full name: El Sekka El Hadid Stadium
- Former names: Railway Stadium
- Location: Nasr City, Cairo, Egypt
- Owner: El Sekka El Hadid SC
- Capacity: 25,000
- Surface: Desso GrassMaster
- Record attendance: 40,000

Construction
- Built: 1910-1913
- Opened: 1913
- Renovated: 1998, 2019

Tenant
- El Sekka El Hadid SC

El Sekka El Hadid Stadium (Arabic: ستاد السكة الحديد), also known as Railway Stadium, is a multi-use stadium in Cairo, Egypt. It is currently used mostly for football matches and is the home of El Sekka El Hadid. The stadium holds 25,000 people.
