= Ittihad Nabarouh SC =

Egyptian football club

Ittihad Nabarouh
- Full name: Ittihad Nabarouh نادي إتحاد نبروه
- Short name: ITN
- Ground: Ittihad Nabarouh Stadium
- Chairman: Ahmed El Mesiery
- Manager: Alaa Noah
- League: Egyptian Second Division
- 2015–16: Third Division, 1st (Group G) (Promoted)

Ittihad Nabarouh (Arabic: نادي إتحاد نبروه), is an Egyptian football club based in Nabarouh, Dakahlia, Egypt. The club currently plays in the Egyptian Second Division, the second-highest league in the Egyptian football league system.
