= 2020–21 Egyptian Premier League =

Egyptian Premier League
- Season: 2020–21
- Dates: 11 December 2020 – 28 August 2021
- Champions: Zamalek; 13th title
- Relegated: Wadi Degla; El Entag El Harby; Aswan
- Champions League (Note: The 2020–21 Egyptian Premier League was not finished by the CAF deadline. As a result, the Egyptian Football Association announced that Zamalek and Al Ahly, who were at first and second place after 29 rounds respectively, would represent Egypt in the Champions League.): Zamalek; Al Ahly
- Confederation Cup (Note: The 2020–21 Egypt Cup was not finished by the CAF deadline. As a result, the Egyptian Football Association announced that Al Masry and Pyramids, who were at third and fourth place after 29 rounds respectively, would represent Egypt in the Confederation Cup.): Pyramids; Al Masry
- Matches: 306
- Goals: 765 (2.5 per match)
- Top goalscorer: Mohamed Sherif (21 goals)
- Biggest home win: Pyramids 6–0 Ghazl El Mahalla (28 August 2021)
- Biggest away win: Misr Lel Makkasa 0–5 Pyramids (25 August 2021)
- Highest scoring: National Bank of Egypt 5–3 Misr Lel Makkasa (18 August 2021)
- Longest winning run: 8 matches Zamalek
- Longest unbeaten run: 19 matches Zamalek
- Longest winless run: 14 matches El Entag El Harby
- Longest losing run: 6 matches Misr Lel Makkasa

The 2020–21 Egyptian Premier League, also known as The WE Egyptian Premier League for sponsorship purposes, was the 62nd season of the Egyptian Premier League, the top Egyptian professional league for association football clubs, since its establishment in 1948. The season started on 11 December 2020 and is concluded on 28 August 2021. Fixtures for the 2020–21 season was announced one week before the start of the competition.

The season was initially scheduled to start in July, but was delayed to November and later to December due to effects and consequence of the postponement of the previous season's conclusion due to the COVID-19 pandemic in Egypt.

Al Ahly were the defending champions, having won their 5th consecutive and 42nd overall league title in the previous season. Zamalek secured their 13th league title and their first since 2015 with two games to spare; ending Al Ahly's five-year dominance.

== Teams ==
Locations of the 2020–21 Egyptian Premier League teams

Eighteen teams will compete in the league - the top fifteen teams from the previous season, and three teams promoted from the Egyptian Second Division.

Teams promoted to the Egyptian Premier League
On 12 October 2020, National Bank of Egypt secured promotion for the first time in their history following a 1–1 draw with Asyut Petroleum in the final round, in which they finished the season at the top of Group A with equal points with second-placed Beni Suef, but they beat them on head-to-head points.

Ghazl El Mahalla became the second team to be promoted on 13 October, after spending four years in the Second Division, as they ended their season at the top of Group C, winning in the last round 2–1 against Olympic Club, thus having a two-point lead ahead of Pharco.

Ceramica Cleopatra were promoted for the first time in their history on 15 October, as they finished their season at the top of Group B, following a goalless draw with Gomhoriat Shebin in the last round, thus they were one point ahead of second-placed Petrojet.

Teams relegated to the Egyptian Second Division
The first club to be relegated was Tanta, who suffered an immediate return to the Egyptian Second Division following Wadi Degla's 4–1 away win against El Entag El Harby on 28 September 2020, which assured the relegation of the El Gharbia-based side. Despite having a decent start early in the previous season, Tanta's performance was progressively worsened and eventually led the club to go on a 17-game winless run and finish on bottom of the table.

The second club to be relegated was FC Masr, who also suffered an immediate return to the Egyptian Second Division following a 1–1 home draw with ENPPI on 3 October 2020 that confirmed the club's relegation. The club did not enjoy a good success in their first-ever season in top flight as they managed to win only 3 matches and conceded more goals that any other club in the league.

Haras El Hodoud became the last club to be relegated on 12 October, as they lost 1–2 to Zamalek in the 33rd round; thus returning to the Second Division after only two seasons in the top tier.

=== Venues ===
Al Ahly	Aswan	Ceramica Cleopatra
Al Salam Stadium	Aswan Stadium	Suez Stadium
Capacity: **30,000**	Capacity: **20,000**	Capacity: **27,000**
ENPPI	El Entag El Harby	Ghazl El Mahalla
Petro Sport Stadium	Al Salam Stadium	Ghazl El Mahalla Stadium
Capacity: **16,000**	Capacity: **30,000**	Capacity: **14,564**
El Gouna	Ismaily	Al Ittihad
Khaled Bichara Stadium	Ismailia Stadium	Alexandria Stadium
Capacity: **12,000**	Capacity: **18,525**	Capacity: **19,676**
Al Masry	Misr Lel Makkasa	Al Mokawloon Al Arab
Borg El Arab Stadium (Note: Al Masry's home stadium, Al Masry Club Stadium, will be unavailable for the 2020–21 season as it's undergoing renovation, and as a result will be required to choose another stadium to be used as their home venue for the 2020–21 season.)	TBD (Note: Misr Lel Makkasa's home stadium, Faiyum Stadium, did not receive approval from local authorities to host the club's home matches for the 2020–21 season yet, and as a result the club might be required to choose another stadium to be used as their home venue for this season.)	Osman Ahmed Osman Stadium
Capacity: **TBD**	Capacity: **TBD**	Capacity: **35,000**
National Bank of Egypt	Pyramids	Smouha
Arab Contractors Stadium (Note: National Bank of Egypt's home stadium, National Bank of Egypt Stadium, did not meet the EFA requirements to host Egyptian Premier League matches, and as a result will be required to choose another stadium to be used as their home venue for the 2020–21 season.)	30 June Stadium	Alexandria Stadium
Capacity: **TBD**	Capacity: **30,000**	Capacity: **19,676**
Tala'ea El Gaish	Wadi Degla	Zamalek
Gehaz El Reyada Stadium	Petro Sport Stadium	Cairo International Stadium
Capacity: **20,000**	Capacity: **16,000**	Capacity: **75,000**

=== Personnel and kits ===
Team	Manager	Captain	Kit manufacturer	Shirt sponsor
Al Ahly	(South Africa) Pitso Mosimane	(Egypt) Mohamed El Shenawy	Umbro	WE, SAIB Bank, Royal Dutch Shell^{1}, Tiger Chips^{1}, GLC Paints^{2}
Aswan	(Egypt) Alaa Abdelaal	Mohamed Gaber	Puma	WE, Oppo, SAIB Bank, Egyptair
Ceramica Cleopatra	(Egypt) Haitham Shaaban	Amer Mohamed	Kelme	Ceramica Cleopatra Group
ENPPI	(Egypt) Helmy Toulan	(Egypt) Ramy Sabry	Nike	WE, Oppo, SAIB Bank, Egyptair
El Entag El Harby	(Egypt) Ahmed Abdel Moneim	Ahmed Yehia	Uhlsport	WE, Oppo, SAIB Bank, Egyptair
Ghazl El Mahalla	(Egypt) Khaled Eid	Mohamed Fathalla	Kelme	Misr Life Insurance
El Gouna	(Egypt) Reda Shehata	Nour El Sayed	Adidas	Orascom Group
Ismaily	(Egypt) Ehab Galal	Mohamed Sobhy	Jako	WE, Oppo, SAIB Bank, Egyptair
Al Ittihad	(Egypt) Hossam Hassan		Xtep	WE, Oppo, SAIB Bank, Egyptair
Al Masry	(Egypt) Ali Maher		Nike	WE, Oppo, SAIB Bank, Egyptair
Makkassa	(Egypt) Mohamed Azima		Nike	WE, Oppo, SAIB Bank, Egyptair
Al Mokawloon Al Arab	(Egypt) Emad El Nahhas	(Egypt) Mahmoud Abou El Saoud	Kelme	WE, Oppo, SAIB Bank, Egyptair
National Bank of Egypt	(Egypt) Khaled Galal		Nike	National Bank of Egypt
Pyramids	(Greece) Takis Gonias	(Egypt) Abdallah El Said	Puma	Swyp^{2}, TikTok
Smouha	(Egypt) Ahmed Samy	(Egypt) Ahmed Homos	Kelme	WE, Oppo, SAIB Bank, Egyptair
El Geish	(Egypt) Abdel Hamid Bassiouny	(Egypt) Mohamed Bassam	Kelme	WE, Oppo, SAIB Bank, Egyptair
Wadi Degla	(Chile) Mario Salas		Sigma Fit	WE, Oppo, SAIB Bank, Egyptair
Zamalek	(France) Patrice Carteron	(Egypt) Shikabala	Puma	Oppo, SAIB Bank, Egyptair, Lactel

1. On the back of shirt.
2. On the sleeves.

- WE, Oppo, El Kasrawy Group, SAIB Bank, EgyptAir and GLC Paints are the league's main sponsors, and their logos are printed on most teams' kits.
- Referee kits are made by Puma.

=== Managerial changes ===
Team	Outgoing manager	Manner of departure	Number of Matches	Date of vacancy	Position in table	Incoming manager	Date of appointment
National Bank of Egypt	(Egypt) Eid Maraziq	Resigned		15 October 2020	Pre-season	(Egypt) Mohamed Youssef	19 October 2020
Pyramids	(Croatia) Ante Čačić	Sacked		1 November 2020	Pre-season	(Argentina) Rodolfo Arruabarrena	
Ismaily	(Brazil) Heron Ferreira	Sacked	3 Matches	21 December 2020	8th	(Egypt) Talaat Youssef	22 December 2020
Ismaily	(Egypt) Talaat Youssef	Resigned	0 Matches	24 December 2020	8th	(Egypt) Saafan El-Sagheer	24 December 2020
Tala'ea El Gaish	(Egypt) Tarek El Ashry	Resigned	5 Matches	2 January 2021		(Egypt) Abdel Hamid Bassiouny	4 January 2021
Aswan	(Egypt) Sami El-Sheshini	Sacked	6 Matches	10 January 2021		(Egypt) Alaa Abdelaal	10 January 2021
Ismaily	(Egypt) Saafan El-Sagheer	Interim		January 2021		(Bosnia and Herzegovina) Dragan Jović	29 January 2021
Wadi Degla	(Cyprus) Nikodimos Papavasiliou	Sacked		21 January 2021		(Chile) Mario Salas	1 February 2021
Ismaily	(Bosnia and Herzegovina) Dragan Jović	Resigned		18 March 2021		(Egypt) Ehab Galal	19 March 2021
Misr Lel Makkasa	(Egypt) Ehab Galal	Signed by Ismaily		19 March 2021		(Egypt) Mohamed Azima	24 March 2021
Wadi Degla	(Chile) Mario Salas	Sacked		27 May 2021		(Egypt) Abdul Baki Jamal	27 May 2021
Misr Lel Makkasa	(Egypt) Mohamed Azima	Resigned		28 June 2021		(Egypt) Mohamed Abdel-Galil	29 June 2021
Pyramids	(Argentina) Rodolfo Arruabarrena	Sacked		1 July 2021		(Greece) Takis Gonias	10 January 2021

=== Foreign players ===
Clubs can have a maximum of four foreign players registered during the season. Clubs cannot sign foreign players unless these players have played in the first or second tier in their countries. Clubs also cannot sign any foreign goalkeepers. In addition, each club can register a player from Palestine, Syria, or the UNAF region; those players are not counted as foreign players. Also, any foreign player who holds Egyptian nationality is not considered a foreign player and will be registered as a local player. For example, Al Masry's player Mahmoud Wadi of Palestine holds both Palestinian and Egyptian nationalities, and as a result he is not registered as a foreign player.

- Players name followed with ^{†} indicates the player is playing out on loan.
- Players name followed with ^{§} indicates the player is playing for the club on loan.
- Players name in **bold** indicates the player is registered during the mid-season transfer window.
- Players name in ITALICS indicates the player has left the club during the mid-season transfer window.

Club	Player 1	Player 2	Player 3	Player 4	Player 5	Under contract	Former players
Al Ahly	(Democratic Republic of the Congo) Walter Bwalya	(Mali) Aliou Dieng	(Nigeria) Junior Ajayi	(Morocco) Badr Benoun	(Tunisia) Ali Maâloul	(Senegal) Aliou Badji	(Angola) Geraldo
Aswan	(Ghana) Solomon Mensah	(Kenya) John Avire					(Burkina Faso) Moussa Dao (Rwanda) Jean-Claude Iranzi
Ceramica Cleopatra	(Ghana) Kwame Bonsu	(Ghana) Winnful Cobbina	(Ivory Coast) Fonsinho	(Ghana) Maxwell Baakoh	(Tunisia) Seif Teka		
ENPPI	(Burundi) Fiston Abdul Razak	(Liberia) Tonia Tisdell	(Tanzania) Himid Mao		(Tunisia) Ziad Boughettas		
El Entag El Harby	(Ivory Coast) Mohamed Sanogo Vieira	(Ivory Coast) Abdul Wahab Hanan	(Mauritania) Mamadou Ndioko Niass		(Palestine) Badr Mousa (Tunisia) Rafik Kamergi		(Tunisia) Aymen Trabelsi (Guinea) Moussa Diawara
Ghazl El Mahalla	(Nigeria) Emmanuel Karbogi	(Nigeria) Moses Odo					
El Gouna	(Ivory Coast) Serge Arnaud Aka	(Uganda) Allan Kyambadde		(Cameroon) Joseph Ngwem	(Tunisia) Mohamed Lahbib Yeken		(Zambia) Walter Bwalya
Ismaily	(Tunisia) Marouane Sahraoui	(Angola) Ary Papel	(Namibia) Benson Shilongo	(Algeria) Redouane Cherifi	(Tunisia) Fakhreddine Ben Youssef		(Guinea-Bissau) Piqueti (Iraq) Humam Tariq (Uganda) Patrick Kaddu
Ittihad	(Jamaica) Damion Lowe		(Uganda) Emmanuel Okwi	(Ivory Coast) Razack Cissé	(Syria) Omar Midani		(Togo) Wilson Akakpo (Libya) Mohamed Anis Saltou
Al Masry	(Burkina Faso) Saïdou Simporé	(Nigeria) Austin Amutu	(Nigeria) Emeka Christian Eze	(Democratic Republic of the Congo) Kazadi Kasengu	(Palestine) Mohammed Saleh		(Libya) Muftah Taktak (Ivory Coast) Cheick Moukoro (Palestine) Mahmoud Wadi
Misr El Makasa	(Ethiopia) Shimelis Bekele	(Rwanda) Kevin Muhire	(Libya) Muftah Taktak	(Madagascar) Paulin Voavy	(Morocco) Ahmed Marchuh		
Al Mokawloon Al Arab	(Burkina Faso) Farouck Kabore	(Colombia) Luis Hinestroza					(Burkina Faso) Maarouf Youssef (Nigeria) Jacob Njoku
National Bank of Egypt	(Burkina Faso) Mohamed Koffi	(Angola) Estrela	(Burkina Faso) Maarouf Youssef	(Guinea) Moussa Diawara	(Tunisia) Mohamed Methnani		
Pyramids	(Burkina Faso) Eric Traoré	(Ghana) John Antwi	(Ivory Coast) Wilfried Kanon	(Uganda) Lumala Abdu	(Tunisia) Amor Layouni (Palestine) Mahmoud Wadi	(Brazil) Ribamar^{†} (Palestine) Hamed Hamdan (Peru) Cristian Benavente^{†}	(Brazil) Keno (Nigeria) Azubuike Okechukwu
Smouha	(Tunisia) Rafik Kabou	(Democratic Republic of the Congo) Eddy Ngoyi	(Guinea) Maguette Diop	(Uganda) Derrick Nsibambi	(Libya) Mohamed Al Tarhoni		
Tala'ea El Gaish	(Gabon) Franck Engonga Obame	(Ivory Coast) Ibrahim Kone	(Guinea-Bissau) Toni Gomes	(Senegal) Talla N'Diaye			
Wadi Degla	(Ghana) Issahaku Yakubu	(Guinea-Bissau) Jorginho	(Ghana) Rodney Antwi	(Ecuador) Diego Calderón	(Tunisia) Iheb Mbarki		
Zamalek	(Morocco) Hamid Ahadad	(Morocco) Achraf Bencharki	(Tunisia) Seifeddine Jaziri	(Tunisia) Ferjani Sassi	(Tunisia) Hamza Mathlouthi	(Morocco) Mohamed Ounajem	

== Results ==
=== League table ===
Pos	Team	Pld	W	D	L	GF	GA	GD	Pts	Qualification or relegation
1	Zamalek (Note: The 2020–21 Egyptian Premier League was not finished by the CAF deadline. As a result, the Egyptian Football Association announced that Zamalek and Al Ahly, who were at first and second place after 29 rounds respectively, will represent Egypt in the 2021–22 CAF Champions League. Meanwhile, Al Masry and Pyramids FC, who were at third and fourth place after 29 rounds respectively, will represent Egypt in the 2021–22 CAF Confederation Cup.) (C)	34	24	8	2	61	21	+40	80	Qualification for the Champions League
2	Al Ahly	34	22	10	2	72	29	+43	76	Qualification for the Champions League
3	Pyramids	34	13	16	5	51	37	+14	55	Qualification for the Confederation Cup
4	Smouha	34	12	18	4	54	41	+13	54	
5	Al Masry	34	13	11	10	44	38	+6	50	Qualification for the Confederation Cup
6	ENPPI	34	12	13	9	37	35	+2	49	
7	Al Ittihad	34	12	12	10	35	35	0	48	
8	Tala'ea El Gaish	34	10	12	12	41	37	+4	42	
9	Al Mokawloon Al Arab	34	11	8	15	37	45	−8	41	
10	Ceramica Cleopatra	34	8	15	11	41	46	−5	39	
11	Ismaily (Note: Ismaily were deducted 3 points.)	34	10	11	13	42	44	−2	38	
12	El Gouna	34	8	14	12	36	41	−5	38	
13	Misr Lel Makkasa	34	10	8	16	36	54	−18	38	
14	National Bank of Egypt	34	6	17	11	39	44	−5	35	
15	Ghazl El Mahalla	34	7	14	13	28	41	−13	35	
16	Wadi Degla (R)	34	5	15	14	29	38	−9	30	Relegation to the Second Division
17	El Entag El Harby (R)	34	5	13	16	35	60	−25	28	Relegation to the Second Division
18	Aswan (R)	34	6	9	19	29	61	−32	27	Relegation to the Second Division

Source: Soccerway
Rules for classification: 1) Points; 2) Head-to-Head points; 3) Head-to-Head goal difference; 4) Head-to-Head goals scored; 5) Head-to-Head away goals scored; 6) Goal difference; 7) Goals scored.
(Note: Head-to-head record is used only after all the matches between the teams in question have been played).
(C) Champions; (R) Relegated

=== Results table ===
Home \ Away	AHL	ASW	CCL	ENP	ENT	GMH	GOU	ISM	ITH	MAS	MMK	MOK	NBE	PYR	SMO	TGS	WDG	ZAM
Al Ahly	—	2–1	4–0	2–0	4–1	3–0	1–1	1–1	4–0	4–2	3–1	3–2	1–1	2–2	1–2	2–1	0–0	1–1
Aswan	1–3	—	1–1	1–0	2–2	1–1	0–1	0–2	0–2	2–3	2–4	1–2	0–2	0–2	1–3	2–1	1–4	0–0
Ceramica Cleopatra	0–2	1–1	—	0–2	1–1	1–1	2–1	2–3	1–1	1–2	1–1	1–1	3–1	0–1	1–1	2–1	1–2	1–2
ENPPI	1–3	0–1	2–1	—	1–1	1–1	2–0	2–1	0–0	1–1	2–0	1–1	3–2	3–2	0–0	1–1	0–0	1–2
El Entag El Harby	2–3	1–1	0–2	0–0	—	0–1	1–1	0–2	1–1	0–3	2–1	1–0	1–3	2–2	1–1	1–2	2–2	0–2
Ghazl El Mahalla	1–0	0–1	0–2	1–0	1–3	—	0–0	2–2	1–1	1–2	1–2	1–2	0–0	2–2	1–1	2–1	2–2	2–1
El Gouna	3–3	1–1	3–2	1–0	2–3	0–0	—	2–1	2–0	1–1	1–0	2–3	1–1	1–2	2–2	0–4	2–0	0–0
Ismaily	0–2	3–2	1–2	1–1	3–3	3–1	3–2	—	1–2	2–1	2–1	0–1	0–0	1–1	0–2	0–0	0–2	0–2
Al Ittihad	1–2	1–3	0–0	0–1	2–0	0–0	0–1	1–0	—	1–1	2–1	4–2	0–0	0–2	1–1	1–1	2–1	1–2
Al Masry	1–2	3–0	2–2	1–3	2–3	1–0	1–0	0–0	1–0	—	0–0	3–1	0–0	1–2	0–1	1–0	2–2	0–1
Misr Lel Makkasa	1–4	1–0	1–2	0–1	1–0	1–0	1–0	3–1	0–4	1–1	—	0–0	3–5	0–5	1–1	0–2	3–1	0–1
Al Mokawloon Al Arab	0–2	0–1	1–1	2–1	1–1	0–1	2–1	1–0	1–3	0–1	3–2	—	2–0	0–2	1–2	0–1	1–0	0–2
National Bank of Egypt	0–0	2–2	1–1	2–3	3–0	1–1	1–1	0–2	0–1	2–0	0–1	0–1	—	0–0	2–2	0–2	1–1	1–1
Pyramids	0–0	2–0	2–4	1–1	3–2	6–0	1–1	2–2	1–2	0–1	1–1	3–1	1–1	—	0–3	1–0	1–1	1–1
Smouha	0–1	5–0	0–0	1–1	4–2	1–1	3–1	0–3	2–2	1–1	1–1	2–2	2–2	1–1	—	4–2	2–1	0–2
Tala'ea El Gaish	0–0	3–0	2–2	1–1	3–0	3–1	1–1	1–1	1–2	0–0	1–2	1–1	0–2	1–1	1–1	—	1–0	1–2
Wadi Degla	1–2	0–0	0–0	1–2	0–0	0–1	0–0	0–0	0–0	1–3	1–1	2–1	4–2	1–3	1–2	0–1	—	0–0
Zamalek	1–2	3–0	2–0	3–1	2–0	3–0	1–0	2–1	2–0	3–2	4–1	2–2	4–1	1–1	2–1	2–1	1–0	—

Source: Soccerway
Legend: Blue = home team win; Yellow = draw; Red = away team win.
For upcoming matches, an "a" indicates there is an article about the rivalry between the two participants.

== Season statistics ==
Goalkeeping

Most Cleansheets

Rank	Player	Club	Cleansheets
1	(Egypt) Mohamed El Shenawy	Al Ahly	12
1	(Egypt) Mohamed Bassam	Tala'ea El Gaish	12
3	(Egypt) Mohamed Abou Gabal	Zamalek	10
3	(Egypt) Islam Tarek	El Gouna	10
3	(Egypt) Mohamed Sobhy	Al Ittihad Alexandria	10
6	(Egypt) Mohamed Abdel Monsef	Wadi Degla	10
7	(Egypt) Amr Shaaban	Ghazl El Mahalla	9
8	(Egypt) Ahmed Masoud	Al Masry	8
8	(Egypt) Mahmoud El Zonfouly	National Bank of Egypt	8
8	(Egypt) Mahmoud Gad	ENPPI	8

=== Scoring ===
==== Top scorers ====
Rank	Player	Club	Goals
1	(Egypt) Mohamed Sherif	Al Ahly	21
2	(Egypt) Mostafa Fathi	Smouha	17
3	(Morocco) Achraf Bencharki	Zamalek	15
3	(Egypt) Ahmed Yasser Rayyan	Ceramica Cleopatra	15
5	(Egypt) Omar Kamal	Al Masry	13
6	(Egypt) Basem Morsy	Misr Lel Makkasa	12
6	(Egypt) Karim Bambo	National Bank of Egypt	12
8	(Egypt) Ahmed Samir	Tala'ea El Gaish	11
8	(Ethiopia) Shimelis Bekele	Misr Lel Makkasa	11
8	(Tunisia) Fakhreddine Ben Youssef	Ismaily	11
8	(Egypt) Ahmed Ali	National Bank of Egypt	11
8	(Egypt) Omar El Said	El Gouna	11
8	(Egypt) Mostafa El Badry	El Entag El Harby	11

Assists

Top Assists

Rank	Player	Club	Assists
1	(Tunisia) Ali Maâloul	Al Ahly	12
2	(Egypt) Hussein El Shahat	Al Ahly	10
2	(Egypt) Amr El Halwani	Aswan	10
4	(Egypt) Mohamed Magdy Afsha	Al Ahly	8
5	(Egypt) Ahmed Refaat	Al Masry	7
5	(Morocco) Achraf Bencharki	Zamalek	7
7	(Egypt) Ahmed Sayed Zizo	Zamalek	6
7	(Egypt) Mostafa Fathi	Smouha	6
7	(Egypt) Amr Gamal	Tala'ea El Gaish	6
7	(Egypt) Abdallah El Said	Pyramids	6

== Number of teams by governorate ==
Number of teams	Governorate	Team(s)
9	Cairo	Al Ahly, ENPPI, El Entag El Harby, Al Mokawloon Al Arab, National Bank of Egypt, Pyramids, Tala'ea El Gaish, Wadi Degla and Zamalek
2	Alexandria	Al Ittihad and Smouha
1	Aswan	Aswan
1	Giza	Ceramica Cleopatra
1	Faiyum	Misr Lel Makkasa
1	El Gharbia	Ghazl El Mahalla
1	Ismailia	Ismaily
1	Port Said	Al Masry
1	Red Sea	El Gouna
