= 2020–21 Egypt Cup =

Tournament details
- Country: Egypt
- Dates: 12 January – 6 February 2021 (qualifying competition); 11 February – 19 October 2021 (main competition)
- Teams: 174 (overall); 156 (qualifying competition); 32 (main competition)

Final positions
- Champions: Zamalek (28th title)
- Runners-up: Al Ahly
- Confederation Cup: Pyramids (Note: The 2020–21 Egypt Cup was not finished by the CAF deadline. As a result, the Egyptian Football Association announced that Pyramids, who were at fourth place after 29 rounds (the last completed round in the 2020–21 Egyptian Premier League before the CAF deadline), would take the cup winners slot and would represent Egypt in the 2021–22 CAF Confederation Cup.)

Tournament statistics
- Matches played: 28
- Goals scored: 83 (2.96 per match)
- Top goal scorer(s): Youssef Obama (3 goals)

The 2020–21 Egypt Cup was the 89th edition of the oldest recognised football tournament in Africa. It is sponsored by Tiger Chips, and known as the Tiger Egypt Cup for sponsorship purposes. It started with the First Preliminary Round on 12 January 2021, and concluded with the final on 21 July 2022.

Egyptian Premier League side Al Ahly are the defending champions, having defeated Tala'ea El Gaish in the final.

The competition was originally scheduled to start in November 2020, but was postponed to early 2021 due to the COVID-19 pandemic in Egypt.

== Teams ==
Round	Clubs remaining	Clubs involved	Winners from previous round	New entries this round	Leagues entering at this round
Qualifying phase (Note: 13 teams received a bye in the qualifying rounds (2 and 11 in the first and second preliminary round, respectively) in order to balance the draw, as a large number of teams from the lower divisions did not enter the competition.)
First Preliminary Round	174	110+2	none	112	Egyptian Third Division; Egyptian Fourth Division
Second Preliminary Round	119	90+11	55+2	44	Egyptian Second Division
Third Preliminary Round	74	56	45+11	none	none
Fourth Preliminary Round	46	28	28	none	none
Main competition
Round of 32	32	32	14	18	Egyptian Premier League
Round of 16	16	16	16	none	none
Quarter-finals	8	8	8	none	none
Semi-finals	4	4	4	none	none
Final	2	2	2	none	none

== Round and draw dates ==
The schedule was as follows.

Phase	Round	Draw date	First match date
Qualifying phase	First Preliminary Round	5 January 2021	12 January 2021
Qualifying phase	Second Preliminary Round	13 January 2021	17 January 2021
Qualifying phase	Third Preliminary Round	13 January 2021	31 January 2021
Qualifying phase	Fourth Preliminary Round	13 January 2021	5 February 2021
Main competition	Round of 32	6 February 2021	11 February 2021
Main competition	Round of 16	6 February 2021	8 March 2021
Main competition	Quarter-finals	6 February 2021	29 April 2021
Main competition	Semi-finals	6 February 2021	TBD
Main competition	Final	6 February 2021	TBD

== Format ==
=== Participation ===
The Egypt Cup begin with a round of 32 teams. The 18 teams of the Egyptian Premier League, along with the 14 winning teams qualified from the Fourth Preliminary Round of the 2020–21 Egypt Cup qualifying rounds.

=== Draw ===
The draw for the main competition was held at the Egyptian Football Association headquarters in Gezira, Cairo on 6 February 2021.

The 32 participating teams were separated into 3 pots. Pot 1 included the 15th placed team from the previous season of the Egyptian Premier League alongside the 3 promoted teams from the 2019–20 Egyptian Second Division, Pot 2 included the top 14 teams from the previous season of the Egyptian Premier League, and Pot 3 included all 14 teams who qualified to the competition through the qualifying rounds.

Teams from Pot 1 were drawn against each other, while teams from Pot 2 were drawn against teams from Pot 3.

Usually, the Egypt Cup defending champions and the Egyptian Premier League winners would be placed in different paths, so both teams could face each other only in the final. However, since Al Ahly won both the cup and the league last season, the club was placed in the "league path" while the league runners-up, Zamalek, were placed in the "cup path".

Pot	Pot 1	Pot 2	Pot 3
Teams	Ceramica Cleopatra; Ghazl El Mahalla; National Bank of Egypt; Wadi Degla	Al Ahly; Aswan; ENPPI; El Entag El Harby; El Gouna; Ismaily; Al Ittihad; Al Masry; Misr Lel Makkasa; Al Mokawloon Al Arab; Pyramids; Smouha; Tala'ea El Gaish; Zamalek	Ashmoun; Coca-Cola; Dikernis; Haras El Hodoud; Ittihad Nabarouh; KIMA Aswan; La Viena; El Mansoura; Al Nasr; Nogoom; Al Obour; Petrojet; El Qanah; Sohag

=== Match rules ===
Teams met in one game per round. Matches took place for 90 minutes, with two halves of 45 minutes each. If still tied after regulation, 30 minutes of extra time was played, consisting of two periods of 15 minutes each. If the score is still level after this, the match was decided by a penalty shoot-out. A coin toss decided who took the first penalty. A total of seven players were allowed to be listed on the substitute bench, with up to three substitutions being allowed during regulation.

All matches were played at venues selected by the Egyptian Football Association.

=== Champion qualification ===
The winners of the Egypt Cup earned automatic qualification for the 2021–22 CAF Confederation Cup. If they had already qualified for the CAF Confederation Cup or CAF Champions League through their position in the Egyptian Premier League, then the spot went to the cup runners-up. If the cup runners-up also qualified for an African competition through their league position, then the spot was given to the fourth-placed team in the league.

Following the postponement of numerous match in the competition throughout the season, the competition was not finished by the CAF deadline for associations to submit participating teams in next season's African competitions. As a result, the Egyptian Football Association announced that Pyramids, who were at fourth place after 29 rounds (the last completed round in the 2020–21 Egyptian Premier League before the CAF deadline), would take the cup winners slot and would represent Egypt in the 2021–22 CAF Confederation Cup instead of the cup winners.

== Qualifying rounds ==
All of the competing teams that are not members of the Egyptian Premier League had to compete in the qualifying rounds to secure one of 14 available places in the Round of 32. The qualifying phase began with the First Preliminary Round on 12 January 2021, and concluded with the Fourth Preliminary Round on 6 February 2021.

== Round of 32 ==
All matches were played between 11 and 24 February 2021, except matches involving teams participating in African competitions (Al Ahly, Pyramids and Zamalek) were postponed and played on 13 March and 14 April 2021. This round includes one team from the Egyptian Fourth Division, La Viena, the lowest ranking side left in the competition. La Viena also became the first club from the lowest league in the Egyptian football league system to qualify for the main round of the Egypt Cup in the competition's history; having participated in all preliminary qualifying rounds.

All times are CAT (UTC+2).

11 February 2021	ENPPI (1)	2–1	Ittihad Nabarouh (3)	Al Salam City, Cairo
14:30	Kasem 57'; Galal 67'	Report	Ibrahim 90+1'	Stadium: Al Salam Stadium; Referee: Mahmoud Roushdy

11 February 2021	Wadi Degla (1)	3–1	National Bank of Egypt (1)	El Sayeda Zeinab, Cairo
14:30	Antwi 21'; Helal 55'; Jorginho 90+3'	Report	Dabash 42'	Stadium: El Sekka El Hadid Stadium; Referee: Mohamed Hassan

13 February 2021	Al Mokawloon Al Arab (1)	1–3	Petrojet (2)	Al Salam City, Cairo
14:30	Hamdy 90'	Report	El Sayed 14'; Felix 49'; Metwalli 65'	Stadium: Al Salam Stadium; Referee: Mohamed Abou Khater

13 February 2021	El Gouna (1)	6–1	KIMA Aswan (2)	El Gouna, Hurghada
14:30	Shabrawy 19'; Mbombo 48', 75', 88'; A. Abdel Fattah 70'; Abdel Naim 80'	Report	M. Abdel Fattah 90+2'	Stadium: Khaled Bichara Stadium; Referee: Mohamed El Qelawi

14 February 2021	Al Ittihad (1)	2–1	Nogoom (2)	El Max, Alexandria
14:30	Kamar 3' (pen.); El Deeb 89' (pen.)	Report	Hammam 58'	Stadium: Haras El Hodoud Stadium; Referee: Mahmoud Wafa

14 February 2021	El Entag El Harby (1)	0–1	Coca-Cola (2)	Nasr City, Cairo
14:30		Report	Abdel Wahed 90+2' (pen.)	Stadium: Osman Ahmed Osman Stadium; Referee: Mohamed El Tabei

14 February 2021	Ismaily (1)	2–1	La Viena (4)	Suez City, Suez
14:30	Shilongo 52', 84'	Report	El Zenary 64' (o.g.)	Stadium: Suez Stadium; Referee: Sabry Ibrahim

15 February 2021	Al Masry (1)	3–0	El Mansoura (2)	Shatby, Alexandria
14:30	Kamal 44', 89'; Amutu 78'	Report		Stadium: Alexandria Stadium; Referee: Sobhy El Amrawy

16 February 2021	Smouha (1)	4–0	Dikernis (2)	Qortasa, Damanhour
14:30	Abdel Kader 27'; El Ouadi 58'; Nsibambi 69'; Hassan 71'	Report		Stadium: Ala'ab Damanhour Stadium; Referee: Mahmoud Desouky

18 February 2021	Tala'ea El Gaish (1)	3–1	El Qanah (2)	Suez City, Suez
14:30	Shehata 23'; El Fil 45'; Bouzas 62'	Report	Hamdy 86'	Stadium: Suez Stadium; Referee: Mohamed Bakr

22 February 2021	Ceramica Cleopatra (1)	2–0	Ghazl El Mahalla (1)	El Max, Alexandria
14:30	Omran 50'; Rayyan 70'	Report		Stadium: Haras El Hodoud Stadium; Referee: Wael Farhan

23 February 2021	Misr Lel Makkasa (1)	2–0	Ashmoun (3)	El Sayeda Zeinab, Cairo
14:30	Taktak 10' (pen.), 38'	Report		Stadium: El Sekka El Hadid Stadium; Referee: Ibrahim Mahgoub

24 February 2021	Aswan (1)	3–1	Sohag (2)	Abbassia, Cairo
14:30	Abdel Zaher 51'; Magdy 78'; Reda 90+3'	Report	Khalil 90+2'	Stadium: Police Academy Stadium; Referee: Galal Ahmed

13 March 2021 (Note: The Pyramids v Al Obour match, originally scheduled to be played on 17 February 2021, was postponed to avoid scheduling conflicts with Pyramids' Confederation Cup fixtures. The match was initially rescheduled to be played on 14 April 2021, before being moved later to 13 March 2021.)	Pyramids (1)	4–1	Al Obour (3)	New Cairo, Cairo
17:00	Issa 5'; Ramadan 73' (pen.); Adel 79'; Antwi 90+5'	Report	Shehata 49' (pen.)	Stadium: 30 June Stadium; Referee: Hesham El Fallal

14 April 2021 (Note: The Al Ahly v Al Nasr match, originally scheduled to be played on 19 February 2021, was postponed to avoid scheduling conflicts with Al Ahly's Champions League fixtures. The match was later rescheduled to be played on 14 April 2021.)	Al Ahly (1)	2–1	Al Nasr (2)	Shatby, Alexandria
21:30	Soliman 45+2'; Bwalya 83'	Report	El Saidy 54'	Stadium: Alexandria Stadium; Referee: Mohamed Abbas

14 April 2021 (Note: The Zamalek v Haras El Hodoud match, originally scheduled to be played on 20 February 2021, was postponed to avoid scheduling conflicts with Zamalek's Champions League fixtures. The match was later rescheduled to be played on 14 April 2021.)	Zamalek (1)	3–1	Haras El Hodoud (2)	Suez City, Suez
21:30	Obama 19'; Alaa 51' (pen.), 68' (pen.)	Report	Youssef 9'	Stadium: Suez Stadium; Referee: Amr Ramadan

== Round of 16 ==
Matches were played between 8 March and 25 September 2021. All matches were initially scheduled to be played between 15 and 23 April 2021. One match involving two teams from the Egyptian Second Division was moved to 8 March 2021 to avoid scheduling conflicts, while unconfirmed matches at that time (involving winning teams from round of 32 fixtures featuring Al Ahly, Pyramids and Zamalek) were postponed to a later date. This round included two teams from the Egyptian Second Division, Coca-Cola and Petrojet, the lowest ranking sides left in the competition.

All times are CAT (UTC+2).

8 March 2021	Petrojet (2)	0–0 (a.e.t.) (4–3 p)	Coca-Cola (2)	El Sayeda Zeinab, Cairo
14:30		Report		Stadium: El Sekka El Hadid Stadium; Referee: Tarek Samy
	Penalties
	Abdel Razek (penalty scored); Moawad (penalty scored); Abdel Kawi (penalty scored); Kanu (penalty missed); Felix (penalty scored)		(penalty scored) Abdel Aziz; (penalty scored) Arafat; (penalty scored) Serge; (penalty missed) Yousri; (penalty missed) Salem

15 April 2021	Wadi Degla (1)	1–0	Al Ittihad (1)	Suez City, Suez
21:30	Helal 58'	Report		Stadium: Suez Stadium; Referee: Nader Kamar El Dawla

15 April 2021	Al Masry (1)	3–1 (a.e.t.)	Tala'ea El Gaish (1)	Shatby, Alexandria
21:30	Gomaa 30' (pen.), 92'; Amutu 107'	Report	A. Gamal 60'	Stadium: Alexandria Stadium; Referee: Tarek Magdy

20 April 2021	Misr Lel Makkasa (1)	2–1	Ceramica Cleopatra (1)	Nasr City, Cairo
21:30	Hesham 1'; Morsy 45'	Report	Cobbinah 90+3'	Stadium: Cairo International Stadium; Referee: Walid Abdel Razek

23 April 2021	Aswan (1)	1–0	El Gouna (1)	New Cairo, Cairo
21:30	El Halwani 88'	Report		Stadium: Petro Sport Stadium; Referee: Mohamed Youssef

27 May 2021	Zamalek (1)	1–0	Ismaily (1)	Suez City, Suez
21:00	Bencharki 41'	Report		Stadium: Suez Stadium; Referee: Amin Omar

24 September 2021 (Note: The Smouha v Pyramids match, originally scheduled to be played on 2 June 2021, was postponed after more than 13 members from the Pyramids' squad tested positive for COVID-19 following their away 2020–21 CAF Confederation Cup fixture against Enyimba in Nigeria. The match was later rescheduled to be played on 24 September 2021.)	Smouha (1)	1–3	Pyramids (1)	Suez City, Suez
19:00	El Ouadi 70'	Report	Ben Youssef 45'; El Said 47'; Ramadan 90+6' (pen.)	Stadium: Suez Stadium; Referee: Amin Omar

25 September 2021 (Note: The Al Ahly v ENPPI match, originally scheduled to be played on 4 June 2021, was postponed following the postponement of the Smouha v Pyramids match in the same round, which was set to be played two days earlier. The match was later rescheduled to be played on 25 September 2021.)	Al Ahly (1)	1–0	ENPPI (1)	Shatby, Alexandria
19:00	S. Mohsen 74'	Report		Stadium: Alexandria Stadium; Referee: Mahmoud El Banna

== Quarter-finals ==
First match in this round was played on 29 April 2021. This round includes one team from the Egyptian Second Division, Petrojet, the lowest ranking side left in the competition.

All times are CAT (UTC+2).

29 April 2021	Wadi Degla (1)	1–2 (a.e.t.)	Petrojet (2)	New Cairo, Cairo
21:30	Jorginho 84'	Report	Ibrahim 88'; El Nubi 111'	Stadium: Petro Sport Stadium; Referee: Mohamed Salama

31 May 2021	Aswan (1)	2–2 (a.e.t.) (5–4 p)	Al Masry (1)	Shatby, Alexandria
19:00	Reda 89'; A. Magdy 90+3'	Report	El Saghiry 18' (o.g.); Salah 49'	Stadium: Alexandria Stadium; Referee: Ahmed Gamal
	Penalties
	Reda (penalty scored); Gaber (penalty scored); El Saghiry (penalty scored); Yehia (penalty scored); El Halwani (penalty scored)		(penalty scored) Grendo; (penalty scored) Moussa; (penalty scored) Shedid; (penalty missed) Amutu; (penalty scored) Antar

22 June 2021	Zamalek (1)	2–0	Misr Lel Makkasa (1)	Suez City, Suez
19:00	Obama 57', 61'	Report		Stadium: Suez Stadium; Referee: Ahmed El Ghandour

26 June 2022 (Note: The Al Ahly v Pyramids match, originally scheduled to be played on 29 September 2021, was postponed due to Egypt national team preparation for the 2022 FIFA World Cup qualifiers.)	Al Ahly (1)	2–1	Pyramids (1)	Cairo
21:30	Taher M. Taher 18'; Hossam Hassan 90'	Report	Ramadan Sobhi 90+4'	Stadium: Cairo International Stadium

== Semi-finals ==
The matches are expected to be played in 2022. This round includes one team from the Egyptian Second Division, Petrojet, the lowest ranking side left in the competition.

All times are CAT (UTC+2).

23 May 2022	Zamalek (1)	2–1	Aswan (1)	Cairo
21:00	Mahmoud Alaa 35'; Obama 36'	Report	Mohamed Gedo 9'	Stadium: Arab Contractors Stadium

2 July 2022	Al Ahly (1)	2–0	Petrojet (2)	Alexandria
21:00	Afsha 8'; Abdelmonem 72'	Report		Stadium: Borg El Arab Stadium

== Final ==
All times are CAT (UTC+2).

21 July 2022	Al Ahly (1)	1–2	Zamalek (1)	Cairo
21:00	Hassan 55'	Report	Zizo 5'; Ashour 29'	Stadium: Cairo International Stadium; Attendance: 5,000; Referee: Szymon Marciniak (Poland)

== Bracket ==
The following is the bracket which the Egypt Cup resembles. Numbers in parentheses next to the match score represent the results of a penalty shoot-out.

Round of 32; 11 February – 14 April 2021
Al Ahly	2
Al Nasr	1
ENPPI	2
Ittihad Nabarouh	1
Smouha	4
Dikernis	0
Pyramids	4
Al Obour	1
Wadi Degla	3
National Bank of Egypt	1
Al Ittihad	2
Nogoom	1
Al Mokawloon Al Arab	1
Petrojet	3
El Entag El Harby	0
Coca-Cola	1
Zamalek	3
Haras El Hodoud	1
Ismaily	2
La Viena	1
Misr Lel Makkasa	2
Ashmoun	0
Ceramica Cleopatra	2
Ghazl El Mahalla	0
Aswan	3
Sohag	1
El Gouna	6
KIMA Aswan	1
Al Masry	3
El Mansoura	0
Tala'ea El Gaish	3
El Qanah	1

Round of 16; 8 March – 25 September 2021
Al Ahly	1
ENPPI	0
Smouha	1
Pyramids	3
Wadi Degla	1
Al Ittihad	0
Petrojet (p)	0 (4)
Coca-Cola	0 (3)
Zamalek	1
Ismaily	0
Misr Lel Makkasa	2
Ceramica Cleopatra	1
Aswan	1
El Gouna	0
Al Masry (a.e.t.)	3
Tala'ea El Gaish	1

Quarter-finals; 29 April 2021 – 26 June 2022
Al Ahly	2
Pyramids	1
Wadi Degla	1
Petrojet (a.e.t.)	2
Zamalek	2
Misr Lel Makkasa	0
Aswan (p)	2 (5)
Al Masry	2 (4)

Semi-finals; 23 May 2022 – 2 July 2022
Al Ahly	2
Petrojet	0
Zamalek	2
Aswan	1

Final; 21 July 2022
Al Ahly	1
Zamalek	2
