= Alexandria Stadium =

Football stadium in Egypt

Coordinates: 31°11′50″N 29°54′48″E

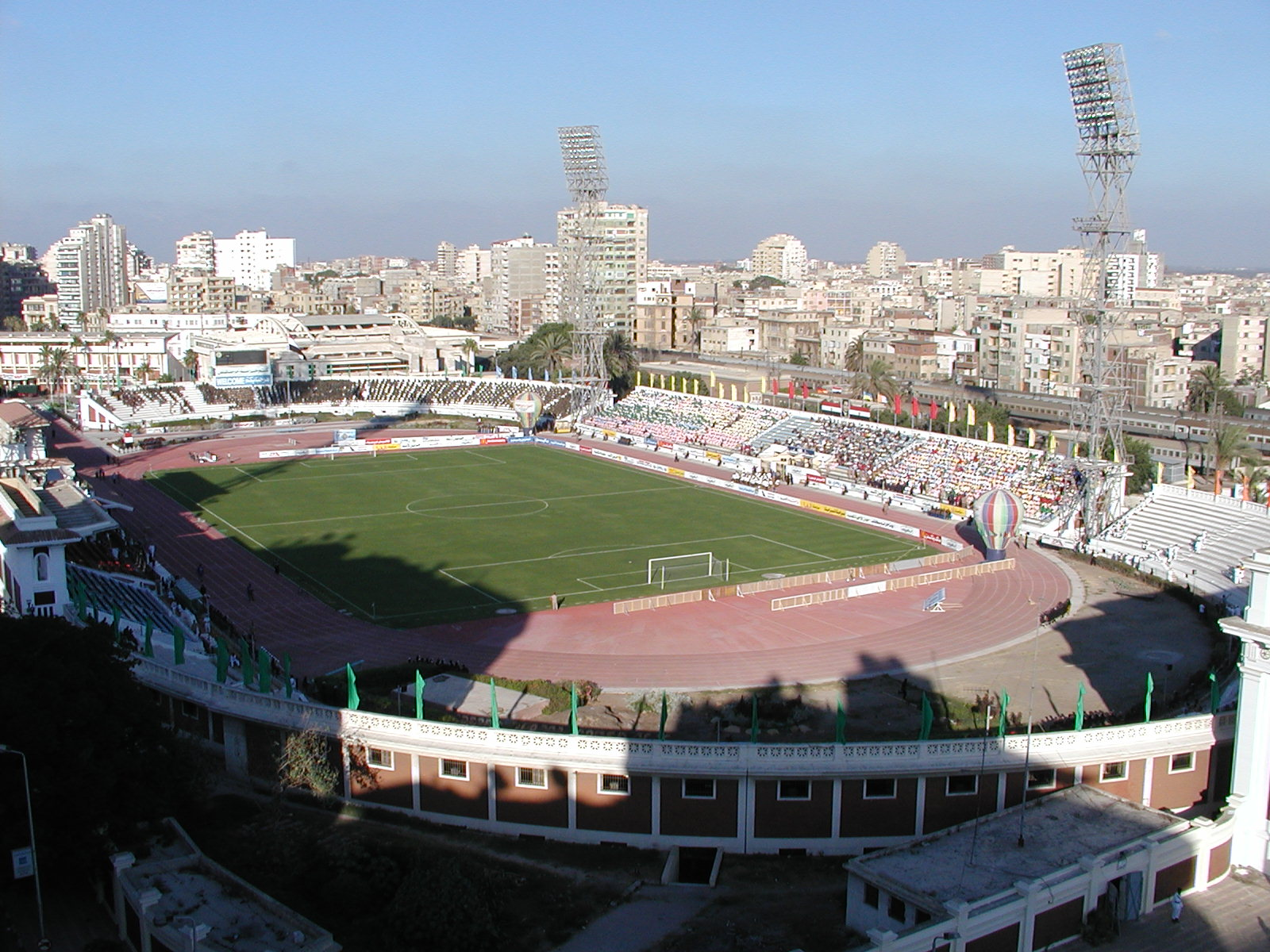
- The stadium on a matchday
- Interactive map of Alexandria Stadium
- Location: Alexandria, Egypt
- Owner: Alexandria Governorate
- Capacity: 13,660
- Surface: Grass

Construction
- Opened: 1929
- Renovated: 2016–2017

Tenants
- Al Ittihad; Smouha (selected matches)

Alexandria Stadium (Arabic: إستاد الأسكندرية) is a multi-purpose stadium in the Moharram Bey district of Alexandria, Egypt. It was opened in 1929 by King Fouad I. It is the oldest stadium in Egypt and Africa.

After its remodeling and renovations in 2016–2017, Alexandria stadium now has a capacity of 13,660. The stadium hosts the Al-Ittihad football team and has been the scene of international tournaments, including the inaugural of the 1951 Mediterranean Games. It was a venue for the 1986 African Cup of Nations and the 2006 African Cup of Nations editions, and hosted the Group B matches during the 2019 African Cup of Nations.

== Architecture ==
The stadium was designed by Russian architect Vladimir Nicohosov, who was influenced by Islamic architecture.

== 2019 Africa Cup of Nations ==
The stadium was one of the venues for the 2019 Africa Cup of Nations. The following games were played at the stadium:

Date	Time (CEST)	Team #1	Result	Team #2	Round	Attendance
22 June 2019	19:00	Nigeria	1–0	Burundi	Group B	3,192
22 June 2019	22:00	Guinea	2–2	Madagascar	Group B	5,342
26 June 2019	16:30	Nigeria	1–0	Guinea	Group B	10,388
26 June 2019	16:30	Madagascar	1–0	Burundi	Group B	4,900
30 June 2019	18:00	Madagascar	2–0	Nigeria	Group B	9,895
6 July 2019	18:00	Nigeria	3–2	Cameroon	Round of 16	10,000
7 July 2019	18:00	Madagascar	2–2 (4–2 pen.)	DR Congo	Round of 16	5,890

== Gallery ==
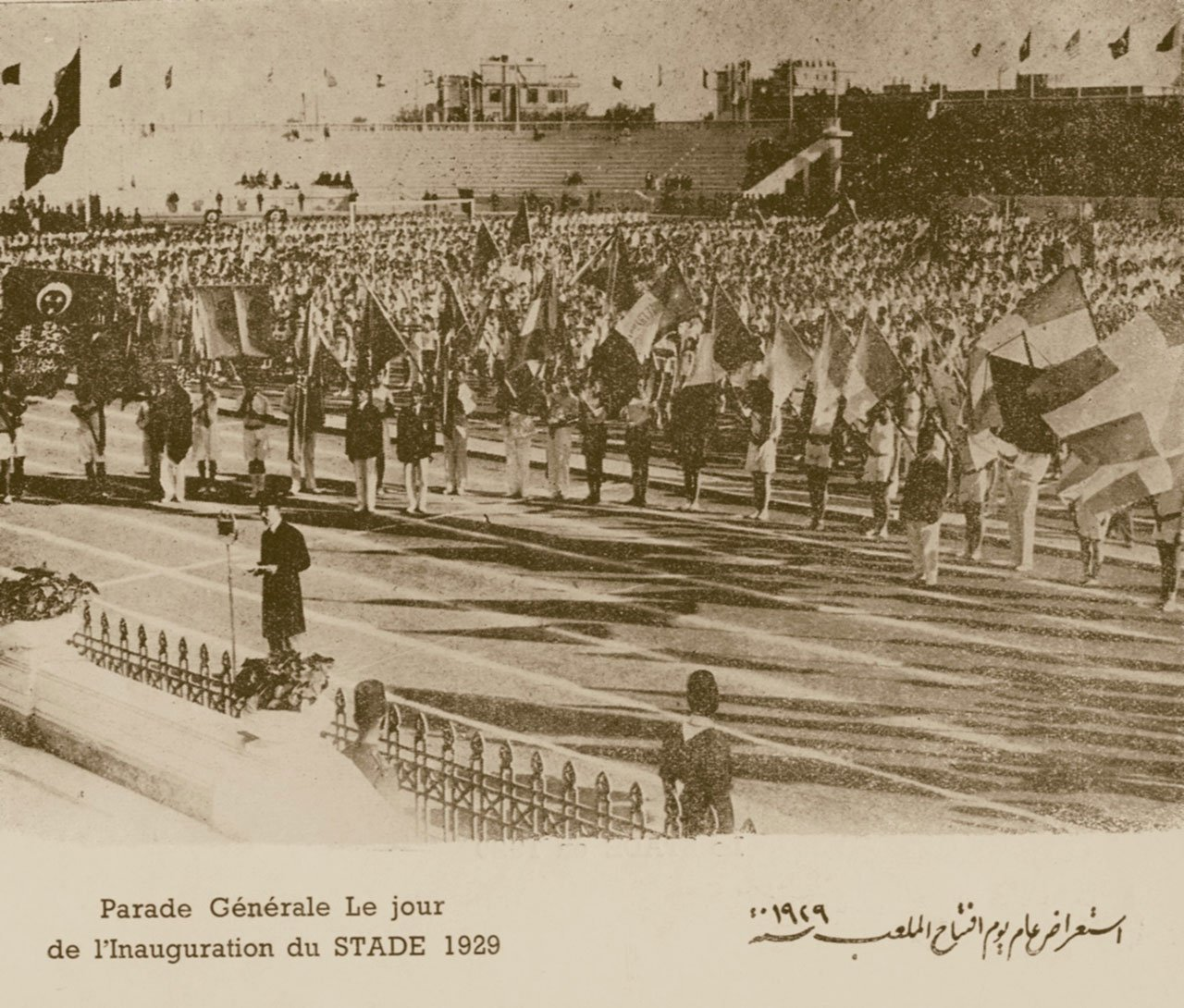
Stadium opening ceremony, 1929

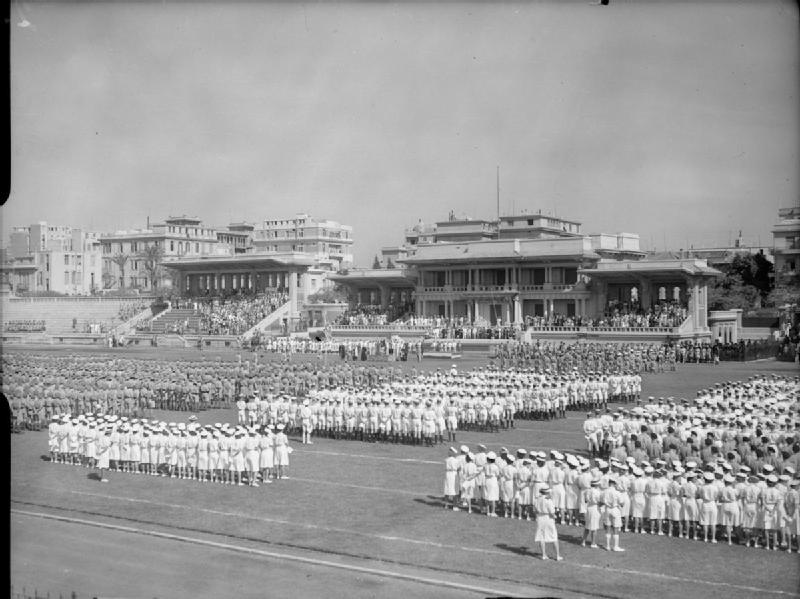
The Royal Navy performing on the stadium during the Second World War c. 1942

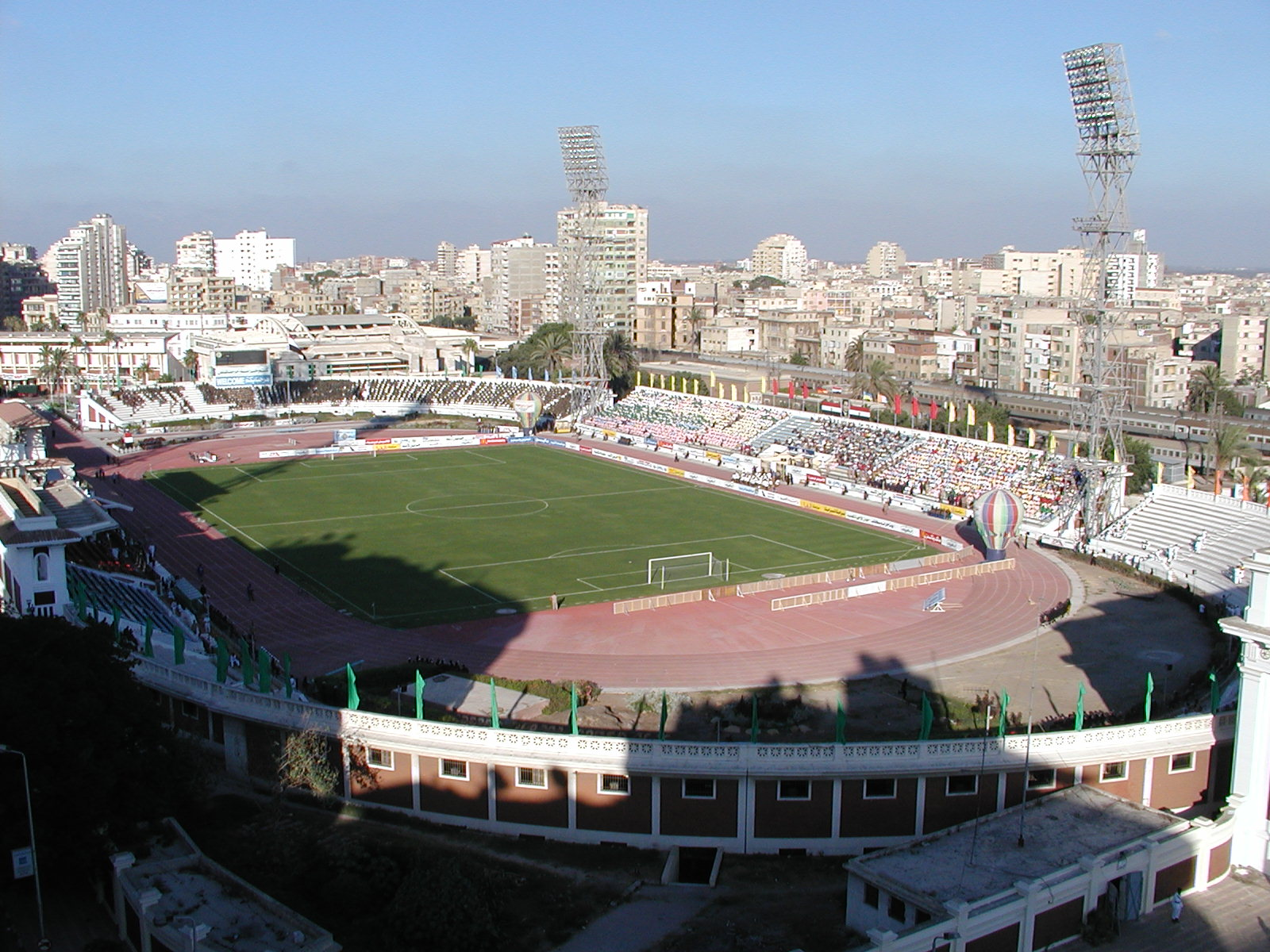
A view of the stadium in 2006

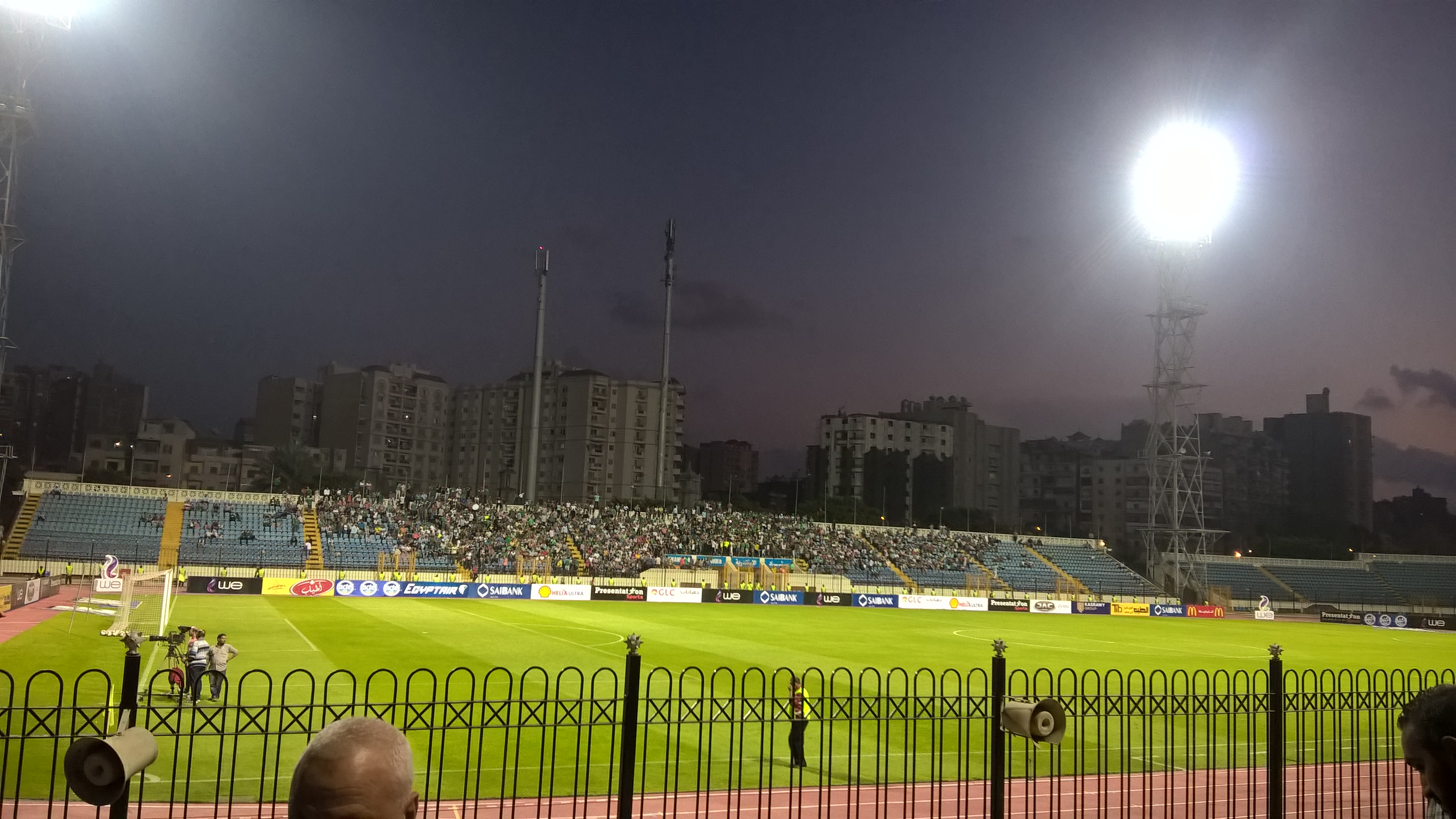
The stadium before an Egypt Cup match between Al Ittihad and Porto Suez in 2018

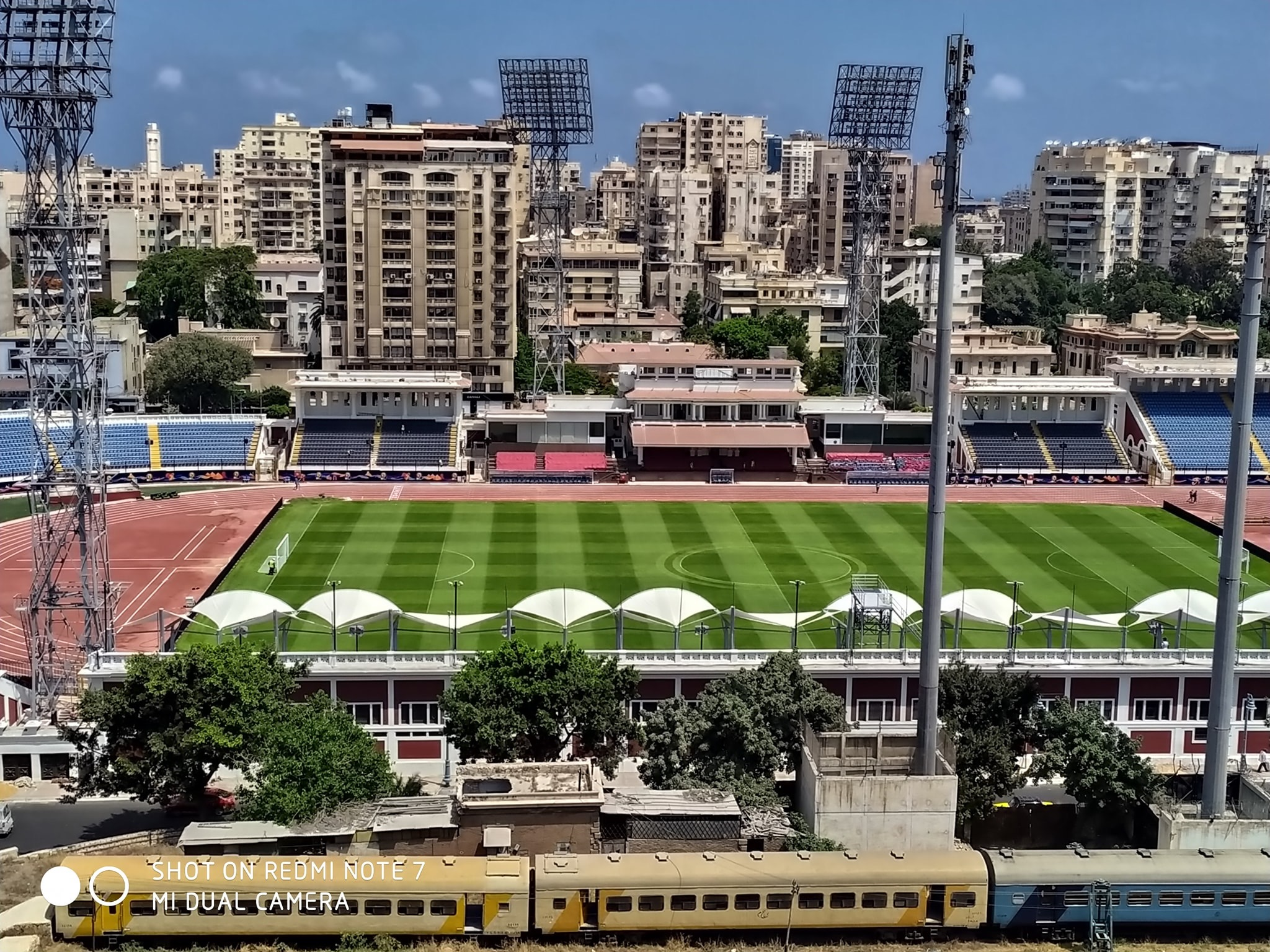
A view of the stadium after renovation process ahead of the 2019 Africa Cup of Nations

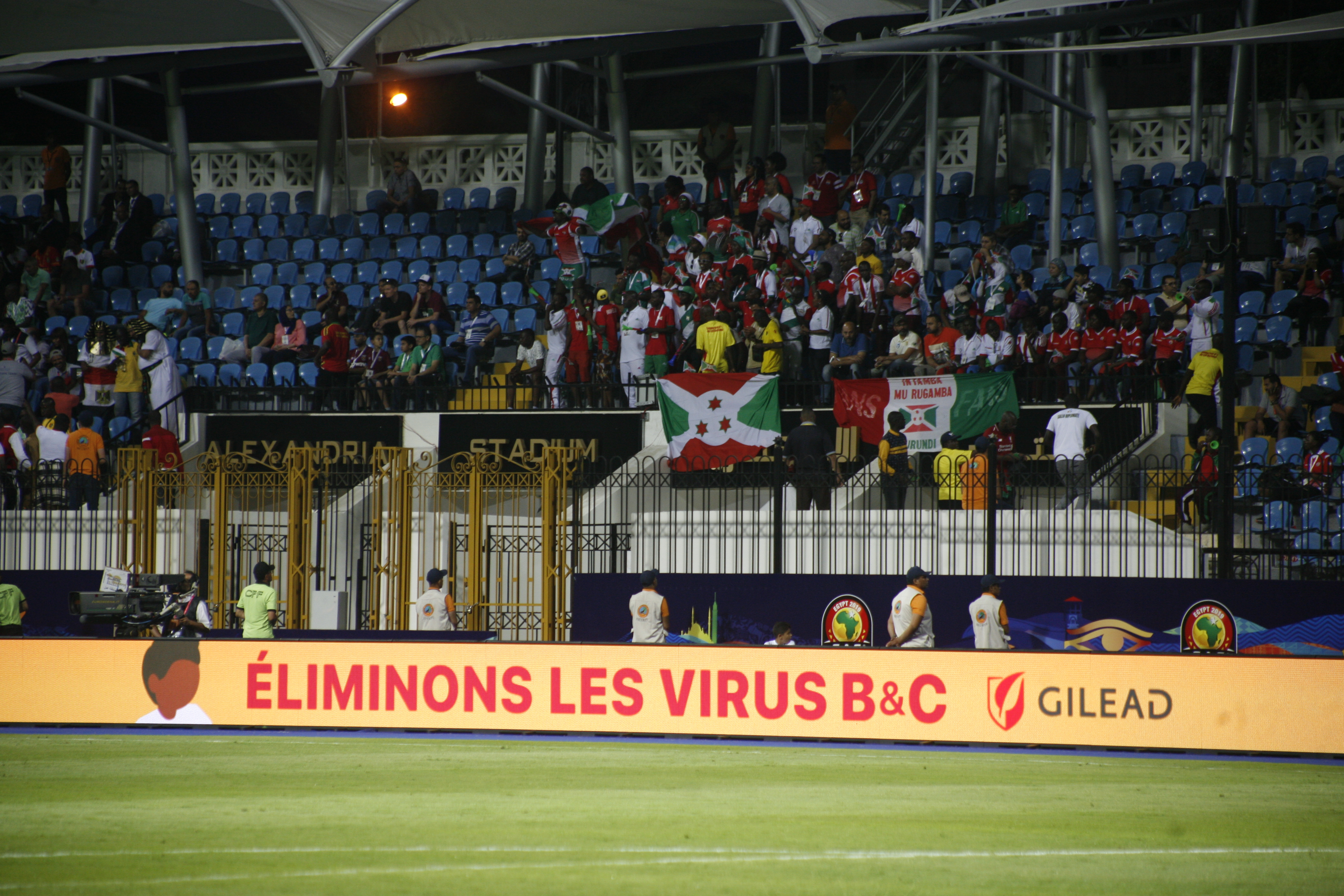
Burundi fans supporting their national team against Nigeria in their 2019 AFCON match

== See also ==
- List of football stadiums in Egypt
- Lists of stadiums

== See also ==
- Borg El Arab Stadium
- Haras El Hodoud Stadium
- Sports in Alexandria
