= Osman Ahmed Osman Stadium =

Football stadium in Cairo, Egypt

Coordinates: 30°03′04.2″N 31°17′49.2″E

- The Green Mountain
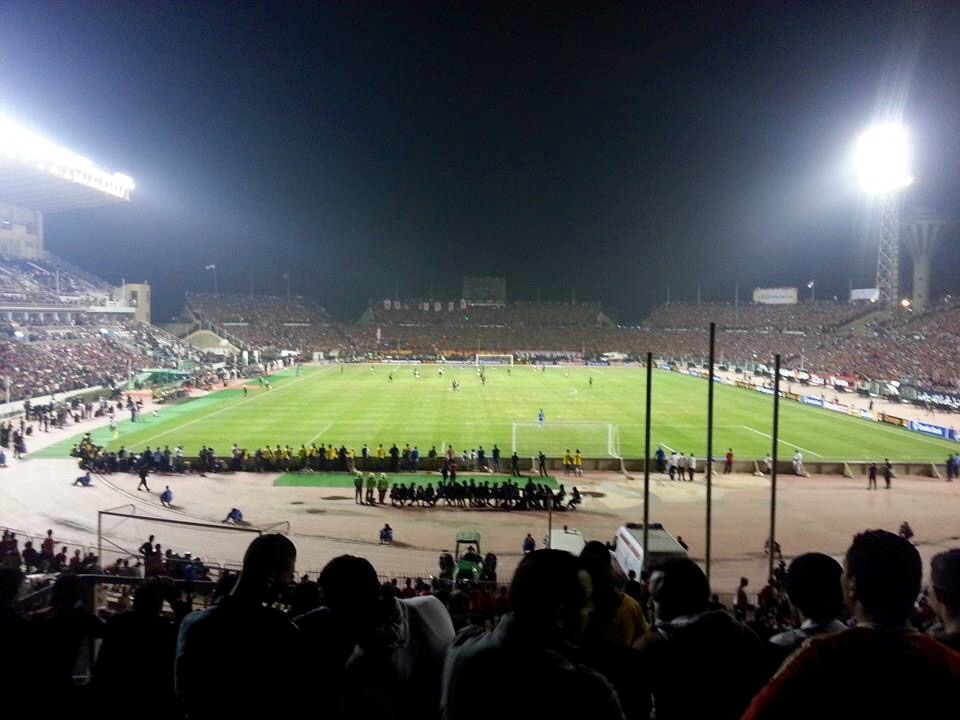
- Interactive map of Osman Ahmed Osman Stadium
- Location: Cairo, Egypt
- Capacity: 35,000
- Surface: Grass

Construction
- Opened: 1979

Tenant
- Al Mokawloon Al Arab

The Osman Ahmed Osman Stadium, also known as the Arab Contractors Stadium or Al-Mokawloon al-Arab Stadium, is a multi-use stadium used mostly for football matches in Nasr City, Cairo, Egypt, which has a seating capacity of 35,000. It is the home stadium of Al Mokawloon Al Arab, and acted as a temporarily home venue for various clubs in Egypt such as FC Masr and Misr Lel Makkasa.

The stadium previously hosted some matches involving the Egyptian national team between 2004 and 2011, and also hosted the second leg of the 2013 CAF Champions League Final between Al Ahly and Orlando Pirates.
