= El Matareya, Dakahlia =

El Matareya المطرية
- City
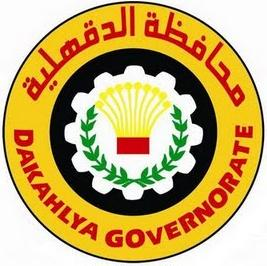
- Flag Seal

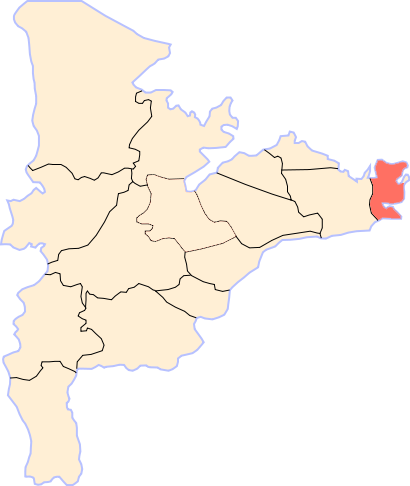
- Location of El Matareya in Dakahlia Governorate.

- Location in Egypt
- Coordinates: 31°11′N 32°2′E
- Country: Egypt
- Governorate: Dakahlia

Area
  - Total: 2.33 km^{2} (0.90 sq mi)
- Elevation: 10 m (33 ft)

Population (2023)
  - Total: 164,743
  - Density: 70,700/km^{2} (183,000/sq mi)
  - Ethnicities: Egyptians
- Time zone: UTC+2 (EET)
  - Summer (DST): UTC+3 (EEST)

El Matareya (also spelled Matarieh or la Matarée) (Arabic: المطرية pronounced [el.mɑ.tˤɑ.ˈɾej.jɑ]) is a coastal city and region (markaz) in Egypt. Located in the Dakahlia Governorate, it is located south of Port Said, nicknamed the fishing town. It lies on the Lake Manzala coast in the northeastern part of the country.

The region should not be confused with the district of El Matareya in Cairo. El Matareya has an estimated population of 164,743 as of 2023, and consists of two main districts: El-Ghasna and El-Okbiyine. It was announced as a separate city in the 1930s, with many villages following in it.

== History ==
The city consisted of two main islands named El-Ghasna and El-Okbiyine. They were distinct islands until 1903 when the government issued a decree to unite both islands under the name El Matareya city. Transportation between the two islands was via wooden boats until the waterway separating the islands was dried up. The first brick houses in the city were built in the 1750s with the roofs being made of wood.

The city played a heroic role during the French campaign on Egypt, where the fishermen joined the resistance forces led by the Egyptian leader of the struggle against colonialism in this region, Sheikh Hassan Tobar. When the French battleships moved from Damietta towards El Matareya to attack, they were surprised by 100 fishermen boats opposing them. At last, the city was occupied by the French in October 1798.

The fishermen of El Matareya played an important role in the digging of the Suez Canal, since they delivered water from the city to the workers in Port Said.

=== The great fire of 1907 ===
The city was destroyed by a devastating fire in 1907. Many people died in the fire and all what was left of the city was ash and remains of dead animals. Al-Ahram newspaper published in its issue dated June 26, 1997, a detailed study on the burning of the city by Dr. Younane Labib Rezk. Khedive Abbas II visited the city upon the fire and ordered reconstruction of its mosques. He also gave a certain amount of money to the people of the city for reconstruction. Also many other steps were taken to help the people construct their city and money was given to all those who suffered losses.

=== 1930s and 1940s ===
El Matareya has followed Dikirnis until 1929 and then followed Manzala until it was announced a city itself and a Centre (markaz) with many villages following it. The streets of the city were very impressive and surprising for visitors since they have been designed and organized perfectly and are almost unique in the world. It was arranged like a chess table that if you stood at the beginning of a street you can see its end without any hindrance, and it is still this way until now.

In this period the city had two mayors, Mohamed Zinedine Azzam was the mayor of El-Ghasna and Kamel Daoud El-Rayes was the mayor of El-Okbiyine.

The fishing industry in the city was affected much since Lake Manzala dried up from 720,000 acres (2,900 km^{2}) to 120,000 acres (490 km^{2}). The remaining lake was divided into several influence regions.

=== Embracing the late president Anwar El Sadat ===
In 1942, People's Artist Zakaria Hijawi hosted Anwar El Sadat in El Matareya (which was Hijawi's hometown). Sadat worked on the car that moved from El Matareya to the Suez Canal, delivering arms to guerrillas and men of the revolution. Years later when Sadat became president, he came back to the city to lay the foundation stone for Al-Salam Canal and visited the house he lived in during his stay in the city which was Ramshackle at that time.

=== Role in the Tripartite Aggression ===
The city was the second line of defense after the Suez Canal during the Tripartite Aggression against Port Said on October 26, 1956. The city was burning by aerial bombardments by the intense aggression. Thousands of boats and fishing boats transported every second hundreds of the wounded and injured to be resuscitated in El Matareya. Also the people of El Matareya welcomed all immigrants from Port Said and other cities along the Suez Canal.

=== Abdel Nasser's Visit ===
On December 24, 1961, the city was decorated to receive late President Gamal Abdel Nasser, who came from Port Said in a boat. Men of the revolution accompanied the late president as Hussein al-Shafi, Kamel-Eddine Hussein, Abdel Hakim Amer, Salah Salem, and others. Then the late president left El Matareya heading towards its neighboring city Manzala, which was decorated too to receive the president.

=== Role in the War of Attrition ===
The city had an important role in the War of Attrition. Many fishermen volunteered to join the Coastguard to be trained on using weapons and defending their points. These exercises came to fruition, where some fishermen caught an Israeli pilot after they forced him to jump off his plane when they shoot at it. Many other achievements were credited to the people of the city in this war.

=== Anwar El Sadat's Visit ===
At 12 noon on November 27, 1979 the helicopter landed in El Matareya carrying President Anwar Sadat and his comrades. The president visited the city to lay the foundation stone for Es-Salam Canal. The city was decorated like never before for that historical day.

== El Matareya in the world ==
There are Crests of El Matareya (French: Les Crêtes du El Matareya), which has an altitude of 812m, in the Pyrénées-Atlantiques in France.

== Rebuilding of El Matareya and relations with Port Said ==
The establishment and division of modern streets is due to a French engineer in 1907 after the famous city fire. He designed the city streets in a modern way in the form of a game of chess, and which befits its coastal location so that its streets are a draft of fresh sea air, and the French also established the station maritime that connects the city of El Matareya to Port Said and Damietta. They also created a railway connecting the city of El Matareya to Mansoura, and this line was known as the French diesel. They also built the famous tank known in the city as Kabbas, and they also built many French-style buildings such as the old police department and coastal buildings. The town of El Matareya has looked after the French since digging the Suez Canal, because El Matareya is the closest neighbor to Port Said. Also, this city was the place where the French who worked in the digging of the Suez Canal lived.

== Château Sahraoui (Maghreb architecture) ==
Le Château Sahraoui or The Sahraoui Castle in El Matareya represents Moorish architecture in Egypt. The Sahraoui Palace (Le Palais Sahraoui) the famous in El Matareya is known as (El-Saraya El-Qasr) was built in the 1940s At the entrance to the town of El Matareya, and it was the only house in El Matareya that had generators. As it has never been cut off from the lighting, it served as a lighthouse for fishermen to know their arrival on earth, The palace was built in Moorish architecture, a palace with a large square tower and high, And he has a big yard in which Gazelles were raised.

== Grande Mosquée Sahraoui ==
La Grande Mosquée Sahraoui or The Great Sahraoui Mosque (El-Abbassi) is a first mosque built in the city of El Matareya, it was founded in 1889-1890 even was built before that date by the family Sahraoui, at that time was the first and the only mosque in this city, thus it was a beacon and a school of sciences of the Islamic religion, the reconstruction of this great mosque by the khedive Abbas II of Egypt, after a city fire in 1907, the Sahraoui family gives the name El-Abbassi to the mosque after this reconstruction, it is now the oldest and largest mosque in the city, also the khedive Abbas built in the city of Port Said a mosque in the same style also called El-Abbassi. The mosque is a story of the Sahraoui family, the migrant family from the Maghreb from Algiers to Port Said, during the period of the drilling of the Suez Canal, at that time, Emir Abdelkader El-Djazaïri, himself was with them in Port Said.

== Villages ==
- El Assafra
- El Dhehir
- Ouled Sobour

== Families of El Matareya ==
The families of El Matareya are made up of migrant families from the Maghreb, Turkey, as well as the Sham and the Arabian Peninsula countries.

== See also ==
- List of cities and towns in Egypt
