= Talbant Aga =

Talbant Aga تلبنت أجا
- Village
- Location in Egypt Talbant Aga (Egypt)
- Coordinates: 30.95617°N 31.29593°E
- Country: Egypt
- Governorate: Dakahlia Governorate
- Elevation: 11 m (36 ft)
- Time zone: UTC+2 (EET)
  - Summer (DST): UTC+3 (EEST)

Talbant Aga (Arabic: تلبنت أجا Talbant Ajā), known in classical antiquity as Thelbonthis (Ancient Greek: Θελβωνθις, Coptic: ⲧⲉⲗⲃⲟⲛⲧ Telbont), is a village in Dakahlia Governorate of Egypt. It is part of the markaz of Aga.

As Thelbonthis, Talbant Aga was an Ancient Egyptian settlement in the nome of Mendes, one of two places in the nome called Thelbonthis. Talbant Aga is the Thelbonthis in the toparchy of Chiastites (the other lay in the toparchy of Ptempathio), in the southwestern part of the nome, near the border with the Sebennytic and Busirite nomes. In the 7th century CE, Thelbonthis continued to prosper, with demand for agricultural exports supporting a fairly wealthy peasantry who used cash payments (in solidi) to lease land from local aristocratic landowners.

The 1885 Census of Egypt recorded Talbant Aga as a nahiyah under the district of Mit Samannud in Dakahlia Governorate; at that time, the population of the town was 609 (301 men and 308 women).

In 1902, the population of Talbant Aga was 724 (357 men and 367 women). All were Egyptian citizens; 722 were Muslim and 2 were Christian. There was a mosque and a zawiya, but no formal school. The cultivated area of the village covered 540 feddans, irrigated by a canal called el-Mansourieh, which lay to the east of the village. The main crops were cotton, wheat, maize, bersim, beans, and various legumes.
