= Saryaqos =

Saryaqos سرياقوس
- Location in Egypt
- Coordinates: 30°21′09″N 31°33′34″E
- Country: Egypt
- Governorate: Qalyubia
- Time zone: UTC+2 (EET)
  - Summer (DST): UTC+3 (EEST)

Saryaqos (Egyptian Arabic: سرياقوس Egyptian Arabic pronunciation: [seɾjæˈʔuːs], from Coptic: ⲥⲓⲣⲓⲁⲕⲟⲥ, lit. 'Syriacus, a given name') is a village in the Khanka markaz located in the Qalyubiyya Governorate in Egypt, in the northern part of the Cairo metropolitan area, at the start of the Nile Delta. In 2006, it had a population of 22,805.

== Overview ==
Saryaqos is the village that is the Northern agricultural frontier of Cairo and this gives it a cultural influence that can be observed all over Egypt, as there are some traditional foods and drinks bearing the name of Saryaqos, such as (Saryaqosy Coffee) (Egyptian Arabic: قهوة سرياقوسي), which is a traditional Egyptian way of making coffee, and some other things that do not necessarily come from that village, but they take a common name for things coming from the northern Egyptian countryside in general.

== Politics ==
Muhammed Abd El-Wahid is representing Saryaqos as part of the Khanka markaz in the Egyptian Parliament in the 2020 elections, And it is now under the rule of the governor of Qalyubia, Abdul Hamid Al-Hajjan.

== History ==
=== Ancient Egypt ===
Saryaqos was an agricultural area in the southern part of the tenth nome of ancient Lower Egypt (Egyptian: 𓈪 pronounced kA wr:) 32.1 km in the southern east direction from the nome's capital Athribis (Egyptian: 𓉗𓏏𓉐𓇾𓁷𓄣𓊖).

=== Middle Ages ===
The beginning of the prosperity of Saryaqos was in the Middle Ages, especially in the era of the Mamluk Sultanate 1323, and it was mentioned in the manuscripts of the Egyptian historian Al-Maqrizi as he had said:

The Mamluk Sultan Al-nasir Muhammad Ibn Qalwun used to go on hunting trips in Berket Al-Jab (now called Berket El Hajj) area near Saryaqos and once he had a great pain in his stomach that almost killed him he was freezing and he was unable to bear the pain then he vowed to god that he would recover to build in this place a place where God is worshiped, then he returned to the mountain castle, so he stayed in bed for several days, and when he had recovered he went himself with the engineers and streamed a mile away from Saryaqos and built a Khnaqah and made in it a hundred retreats for a hundred Sufis and built them a mosque next to it to pray the friday prayer and built a bathroom and a kitchen in it. When the khnaqah was built in the year 725 AH, he went out himself with the princes, judges and sheikhs of the khnaqah, and he distributed food baskets and sixty thousand silver Dirhams inside the khnaqah and since then people wanted to live around this khnaqah and built their houses and shops around the khnaqah till it became a large town that they named the Saryaqosec Khnaqah to distinguish it from the rest of the khnaqahs

And that khnaqah the historian Al-Maqrizi referred to was a center of Saryaqos and then people started calling it al khanka (Egyptian Arabic: الخانكة), but this khnaqah disappeared with the passage of time.and the historian Ibn Taghribirdi talked about palaces that was located there in his book (Al-Nujum Al-Zahira Fi Muluk Misr Wa'l-Qahira) when he mentioned the Sultanate of Al-Nasir Muhammad Ibn Qalawun as he had said:

Palaces for princes were also built in Saryaqos, and the Sultan’s opinion was that a bay should be dug outside Cairo that ends at Saryaqos, and waterwheels and agricultural facilities were built on it, and boats traveled in it during the days of the nile flood to bring crops and others to the palaces of the princes and I saw for myself the remains of those palaces that were in Saryaqos and it had been destroyed during the reign of the Sultan Al-Ashraf Barsbay within the year eight hundred and thirty AH, and Prince Soudoun Bin Abdul Rahman took the ruins and built his mosque over it, which was the reason for wiping it out, and it was one of the beauties of the world

Then Ibn Taghribirdi explained that the palaces were destroyed and became rubble due to the decay of construction in Saryaqos after the reign of the Sultan Al-Nasir Muhammad Ibn Qalawun. when he talked about the prince Soudon in his book (Al-Manhal) as he had said:

he built several buildings in Damascus and established a Sufi school in the khnaqah in Saryaqos, where the sermon is held. And it was completed in the year eight hundred and twenty-six AH, and we went with him to the school, and we found it out in the open, and there was no construction around it except for a little

=== Modern period ===
The description of Saryaqos in Al-Maqrizi's book generally applies more to the nearby city of El-Khankah. The current village may be an extension of the old village, as it is on the eastern bank of the Ismailia Canal, Which was not completed before 1863.

After the Arab Spring, indiscriminate construction spread in an unprecedented manner in the Nile Delta countryside, and until the Egyptian President Abdel Fattah Al-Sisi completely prevented construction in the village, it ended up, along with some other villages, connecting with the city of El-Marg in the south and the city of El-Khanka in the east, to make together a huge city of slums interspersed with some agricultural patches, but it remains administratively separate anyway.
