= Phernouphis =

Town in Ancient Egypt

- P3-r3-nfr
- Barnūfa; Tell Billa; Tell Tebilla
- Location within Nile Delta Location within Egypt
- 31°3′27.9″N 31°34′53.7″E

Phernouphis (Ancient Greek: Φερνουφις) was a town of Ancient Egypt, in the Mendesian nome. It was the capital of the eponymous Phernouphite toparchy. It was located at the site of Barnufa, which was a hod or irrigation basin located 3.5 km (2.2 miles) southwest of Dekernes, within the territory of Tanah, but the site has since been covered up by modern construction.

== Name ==
D21 Z1 N36 F35 X1 O49
rʾ nfr(t)
in hieroglyphs
Era: Ptolemaic dynasty
(305–30 BC)

The name originally was P3-r3-nfr or "the beautiful mouth" and represents a continuation of the original name of the nearby Tell Tebilla, which, as "Ro-Nefer", had been the original nome capital. The site Barnufa preserves this ancient name. It is possible that, after the meaning of the old Egyptian name was no longer apparent to Arabic-speaking locals, it was reinterpreted as referring to the plant Pluchea dioscoridis, or barnūf in Arabic.

== History ==
Phernouphis is attested in Greek sources from the 3rd century BC to the 4th AD. By the Roman period, as sedimentation led to the old site of Tell Tebilla no longer being on the coast, the settlement had shifted to the site of Barnufa. (This was a similar process to the shift from Mendes to Thmuis as the nome capital.) During this period, Tell Tebilla was used as a quarry for construction materials.
