= Temay El Amdeed =

Timay al-Imdid تمى الأمديد ⲑⲙⲟⲩⲓ ⲡϭⲓⲙⲉⲛⲧⲏϯ
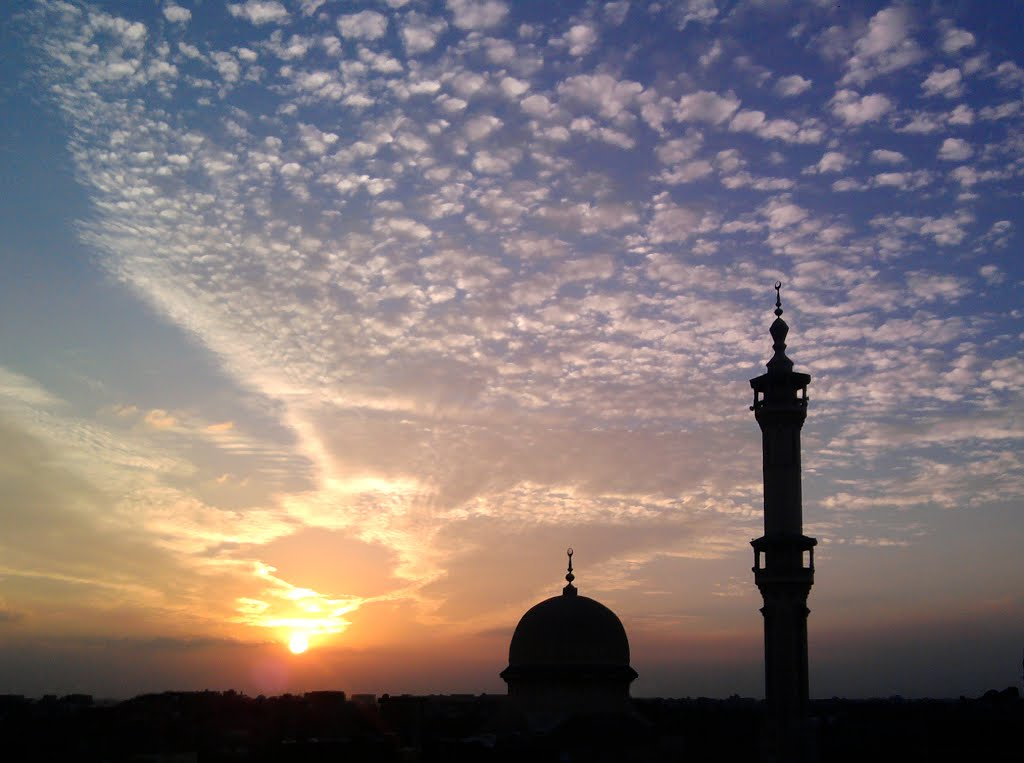
- the Islamic complex of Temay El Amdeed

- Location in Egypt Timay al-Imdid (Egypt)
- Coordinates: 30.94384°N 31.52926°E
- Country: Egypt
- Governorate: Dakahlia Governorate

Area
  - Total: 131 km^{2} (51 sq mi)
- Elevation: 9 m (30 ft)

Population (2019 (estimated))
  - Total: 201,956
  - Density: 1,540/km^{2} (3,990/sq mi)
- Time zone: UTC+2 (EET)
  - Summer (DST): UTC+3 (EEST)

Timay al-Imdid (Arabic: تمي الإمديد Timayy al-Imdīd, Coptic: ⲑⲙⲟⲩⲓ ⲡϭⲓⲙⲉⲛⲧⲏϯ thmoui pčhimentēti), the ancient Thmuis and Mendes, is a city and markaz in Dakahlia Governorate of Egypt. The estimated population of the markaz in 2019 was 201,956, with 19,366 living in urban areas and 182,590 in rural areas.

== Name ==
The name Timayy is derived from the Coptic word ⲑⲙⲟⲩ tmoui, meaning "island", a fairly common Coptic place name element. In this case it is an abbreviation of Demotic tꜣ-mꜣw.t-n-pr-bꜣ-nb-ḏd.t "the island of Mendes". The second part Amdid (older form Mandid or Mandadi) comes from Coptic: ⲡϭⲓⲙⲉⲛⲧⲏϯ, a compound toponym the first part of which is ϭⲓⲏ "border, edge" and the second one comes from Egyptian pr-bꜣ-nb-ḏd.t "temple of Aries of the lord of ḏdt" which is also the source of Ancient Greek: Μενδης.

== History ==
There were Coptic revolts in Timayy in 725-726 and 831-832. It had a Christian bishopric.

The 1885 Census of Egypt recorded Timay al-Imdid (as "Tami-el-Amdid") as a nahiyah under the markaz of El Senbellawein in Dakahlia Governorate; at that time, the population of the town was 1,338 (694 men and 644 women).

== Notable people ==
- El Deif Ahmed
- Hamza Abdelkarim
