= List of cities in Egypt =

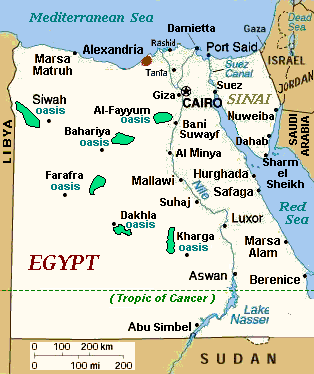
General map of Egypt, with main cities

The cities and towns of Egypt are the urban administrative units of the Republic of Egypt. Egypt comprises 249 populated cities within the country's 27 governorates. Some of these cities fall directly under the authority of the governorate in which they are located, while others are managed by the New Urban Communities Authority, which is affiliated with the Ministry of Housing, Utilities, and Urban Communities. The New Urban Communities Authority was established to create new urban centers to attract residents away from the Nile Valley and Delta.

Besides being one the first states in the history of the world, and one of the oldest cradles of human civilization, Egypt is also one of the oldest in terms of urban development. Urban formation in the country began in prehistoric times, starting with the formation of villages consisting of groups of Egyptian families living together in one place, on or near the banks of the Nile River. Each village had its own deity. The Egyptians then began to utilize the Nile River, digging canals and waterways to facilitate agriculture. Cities began to emerge through the merging of groups of villages, each with its own ruler and deity. Temples were built, markets arose, and trade and industry flourished alongside agriculture throughout ancient Egyptian history. Some ancient cities have survived to the present day for thousands of years. The establishment of cities has continued throughout history as needed, whether to attract populations and reduce overcrowding in certain areas, or for specific purposes such as industry and trade, or as garrisons and border posts to protect the country along its land or sea borders. The Egyptian Constitution guarantees the possibility of establishing new administrative units, such as cities, and modifying or abolishing their administrative boundaries, taking into account economic and social conditions as regulated by Egyptian law.

== 0-9 ==
- 10th of Ramadan
- 15th of May
- 6th of October

== A ==
- Abu El Matamir
- Abu Hummus
- Abu Tesht
- Abu Tig
- Akhmim
- Al Khankah
- Alexandria
- Arish
- Ashmoun
- Aswan
- Awsim
- Ain Sokhna
- Asyut

== B ==
- Badr
- Baltim
- Banha
- Basyoun
- Biyala
- Belqas
- Beni Mazar
- Beni Suef
- Beni Ebeid
- Biba
- Bilbeis
- Birket El Sab
- Borg El Arab
- Borg El Burullus
- Bush

== C ==
- Cairo

== D ==
- Dahab
- Dairut
- Damanhur
- Damietta
- Dar El Salam
- Daraw
- Deir Mawas
- Dekernes
- Dendera
- Desouk
- Diarb Negm
- Dishna

== E ==
- Edfu
- Edku
- El Alamein
- El Ayyat
- El Badari
- El Badrashein
- El Bagour
- El Balyana
- El Basaliya
- El Bayadiya
- El Dabaa
- El Delengat
- El Fashn
- El Gamaliya
- El Ghanayem
- El Gouna
- El Hamool
- El Hamam
- El Hawamdeya
- El Husseiniya
- El Idwa
- El Kanayat
- El Mahalla El Kubra
- El Mahmoudiyah
- El Mansha
- El Manzala
- El Maragha
- El Matareya
- El Qantara
- El Qanater El Khayreya
- El Qoseir
- El Quseyya
- El Qurein
- El Rahmaniya
- El Reyad
- El Rhoda
- El Saff
- El Santa
- El Sarw
- El Sebaiya
- El Senbellawein
- El Shohada
- El Shorouk
- El Tor
- El Waqf
- El Wasta
- El Zarqa
- Esna
- Ezbet El Borg

== F ==
- Faqous
- Faraskur
- Farshut
- Fayed
- Faiyum
- Fuka

== G ==
- Girga
- Giza
- Gogar

== H ==
- Hosh Essa
- Hurghada

== I ==
- Ibsheway
- Ihnasya
- Ismailia
- Itay El Barud
- Itsa

== J ==
- Jahina

== K ==
- Kafr El Sheikh
- Kafr El Zayat
- Kafr El Battikh
- Kafr El Dawwar
- Kafr Saad
- Kafr Saqr
- Kafr Shukr
- Kafr Zarqan
- Kerdasa
- Khanka
- Kharga
- Khusus
- Kom Hamada
- Kom Ombo

== L ==
- Luxor

== M ==
- Maghagha
- Mallawi
- Manfalut
- Mansoura
- Mashtool El Souk
- Matai
- Menouf
- Marsa Alam
- Marsa Matrouh
- Megan
- Metoubes
- Minya
- Minyet El Nasr
- Mit Ghamr
- Mit Rahina
- Mit Salsil
- Monsha'at El-Qanater
- Mut
- Mokattam

== N ==
- Nabaruh
- Nasr City
- Nag Hammadi
- Naqada
- The New Capital
- New Alamein
- New Aswan
- New Akhmim
- New Asyut
- New Beni Suef
- New Borg El Arab
- New Cairo
- New Damietta
- New Faiyum
- New Minya
- New Nubariya
- New Salhia
- New Sohag
- New Tiba
- New Qena
- Nuweiba

== O ==
- Obour
- Oxyrhynchus (also known as El Bahnasa)

== P ==
- Port Said
- Port Fuad

== Q ==
- Qaha
- Qallin
- Qalyub
- Qena
- Qift
- Quesna
- Qus
- Qutur

== R ==
- Rafah
- Ras Burqa
- Ras el-Barr
- Ras Gharib
- Ras Sedr
- Ras Shokeir
- Rosetta
- Ras El Hekma

== S ==
- Sadat
- Safaga
- Sahel Selim
- Saint Catherine
- Samalut
- Samanoud
- Saqultah
- Shubra Khit
- Sers El Lyan
- Sharm El Sheikh
- Sherbin
- Sheikh Zuweid
- Shibin El Qanater
- Shibin El Kom
- Shubra El Kheima
- Sidi Barrani
- Sidi Salem
- Sinnuris
- Sodfa
- Sohag
- Suez
- Sheikh Zayed City
- Sumusta
- Sidi Abdel Rahman

== T ==
- Taba
- Tahta
- Tala
- Talkha
- Tamiya
- Tanta
- Tell El Kebir
- Tima
- Tukh

== W ==
- Wadi El Natrun

== Z ==
- Zagazig
- Zefta

== Largest cities ==
Name	Arabic	Governorate	Area code	Population (2023 estimate)	Photo
Cairo*	القاهرة	Cairo	(+20) 2	10,000,000	
Alexandria	الاسكندرية	Alexandria	(+20) 3	5,362,517	
Giza*	الجيزة	Giza	(+20) 2	4,458,135	
Shubra El Kheima*	شبرا الخيمة	Qalyubia	(+20) 2	1,275,700	
Port Said	بور سعيد	Port Said	(+20) 60	791,749	
Suez	السويس	Suez	(+20) 60	716,458	
Mansoura	المنصورة	Dakahlia	(+20) 50	632,330	
El Mahalla El Kubra	المحلة الكبرى	Gharbia	(+20) 40	614,202	
Tanta	طنطا	Gharbia	(+20) 40	597,694	
Asyut	اسيوط	Asyut	(+20) 88	562,061	
Faiyum	الفيوم	Faiyum	(+20) 84	531,861	
Khusus*	الخصوص	Qalyubiyya		502,864	
Zagazig	الزقازيق	Sharqia	+(20) 55	460,501	
Ismailia	الاسماعيلية	Ismailia	(+20) 69 (+20) 64	450,388	
Aswan	اسوان	Aswan	(+20) 97	401,890	
6th of October (city)*	السادس من أكتوبر	Giza		376,302	
Damanhur	دمنهور	Beheira	(+20) 45	329,572	
New Cairo*	القاهرة الجديدة	Cairo	(+20) 2	319,488	
Damietta	دمياط	Damietta	(+20) 57	312,863	
Minya	المنيا	Minya	(+20) 86	298,021	
Beni Suef	بنى سويف	Beni Suef	(+20) 82	294,125	
Luxor	الاقصر	Luxor	(+20) 95	284,952	
Sohag	سوهاج	Sohag	(+20) 93	278,425	
Shibin El Kom	شبين الكوم	Monufia	(+20) 48	277,991	
Qena	قنا	Qena	(+20) 96	264,498	
10th of Ramadan	العاشر من رمضان	Sharqia		263,321	
Mallawi	ملوي	Minya	(+20) 86	223,435	
Hurghada	الغردقة	Red Sea	(+20) 65	214,247	
Arish	العريش	North Sinai	(+20) 68	204,391	
Kafr El Sheikh	كَفرُ الشَّيْخ	Kafr El Sheikh	(+20) 47	198,197	
Bilbeis	بلبيس	Sharqia		198,167	
Marsa Matrouh	مرسى مطروح	Matrouh	(+20) 46	193,293	
Banha	بنها	Qalyubia	(+20) 13	187,469	

* Cities that are part of Greater Cairo metropolitan area.

== See also ==
- List of towns and villages in Egypt
- Subdivisions of Egypt
- Geography of Egypt
- Climate of Egypt
- List of historical capitals of Egypt
- List of urban areas in Africa by population
- List of largest cities in the Arab world
- Lists of cities in Asia
