= Itsa =

Itsa أطسا
- City
- Location in Egypt
- Coordinates: 29.2375°N 30.789444°E
- Country: Egypt
- Governorate: Faiyum

Area
  - Total: 483.6 km^{2} (186.7 sq mi)
- Elevation: 16 m (52 ft)

Population (2021)
  - Total: 773,167
  - Density: 1,599/km^{2} (4,141/sq mi)
- Time zone: UTC+2 (EET)
  - Summer (DST): UTC+3 (EEST)

Itsa (Arabic: أطسا, from Coptic: ⲧⲥⲏ, lit. 'the place') is a city and a Markaz in the Faiyum Governorate, Egypt. The city is located south of Faiyum. Its population was estimated at 773,167 people in 2021.
