= Naguib Surur =

Egyptian poet, playwright, actor and critic

- Born: Mohamed Naguib Mohamed Hagras; June 1, 1932; Ikhtab, Aga, Dakahliya, Egypt
- Died: October 24, 1978 (aged 46)

Naguib Surur (Arabic: نجيب سرور; born 1 June 1932 - 24 October 1978) was an Egyptian poet, playwright, actor and critic.

== Career ==
One of his most successful folk-themed plays, "Yasin and Bahiyah," was staged by Karam Motawea in 1964 at the Masrah al-Jayb (Pocket Theatre) in Cairo. It incorporated the traditional Egyptian folk story-telling device of the sha'ir al-rababah (poet of the rababa), who plays the simple one-stringed instrument to accompany his tale. The tragic play deals with a class struggle between the oppressed peasant farmers (fellahin) of a Delta village, Bahut, who rise up against the feudal pasha (unnamed) in order variously to protect their land rights (Yasin's father), the honor of his betrothed (Yasin), and their crops from being expropriated by the Pasha's goons (the entire village). The central love story involves young fellah Yasin and his cousin Bahiyah, whose marriage plans are frustrated year after year. Yasin is finally shot and killed, and Bahiyah awaits the return of his spirit in the form of a dove or butterfly, accordingly to the folk tradition.

== Selected works ==
His best-known poem 'Kuss Ummiyyat', written after the 1967 Arab-Israeli war, veered between expletives and lyricism in a savage attack on the corruption of society and state in the Nasser regime. Circulating but never published in his lifetime, it was partly posted on the web by his son, Shohdy Surur, in 2001: arrested and sentenced to one year's imprisonment, Shohdy left the country before his appeal hearing in 2002.
