= El Matareya =

El Matareya (also spelled al-Matariyya, al-Matariyyah or Mataria) may refer to:

- El Matareya, Cairo
- El Matareya, Dakahlia
