= Ateyyat El Abnoudy =

Egyptian journalist, lawyer, actress, producer, and movie director

- Born: November 26, 1939; Nile Delta, Egypt
- Died: October 5, 2018 (aged 78)
- Other names: Ateyyat Awad Mahmoud Khalil
- Citizenship: Egypt
- Education: University of Cairo, Higher Institute of Cinema
- Occupations: Actress, lawyer, movie producer
- Years active: 1971-2018
- Spouse: Abdel-Rahman El Abnoudy (div.)

Ateyyat El Abnoudy (November 26, 1939 – October 5, 2018), also known as Ateyyat Awad Mahmoud Khalil, was an Egyptian journalist, lawyer, actress, producer, and movie director. She was born in a small village along the Nile Delta in Egypt. El Abnoudy was considered to be one of the pioneering Arab female movie directors as her films inspired the works of many Arab women in the industry. She has been called the "poor people's filmmaker" due to the subject matter that inspired her to make films, including civil rights issues and the condition of impoverished Arabs.

El Abnoudy has received more than 30 international awards for her 22 films, including three for Horse of Mud, released in 1971.

== Early life and education ==
Ateyyat El Abnoudy was raised in rural El Simbelaween, Daqahlia Governorate, located on the north of the Nile Delta. She was born to a family of labourers, coming from a line of spice and textile merchants along the Nile. She was the sixth born of seven children, having four sisters and three brothers, and became the only girl in her family to finish school. El Abnoudy attended the University of Cairo at the age of 16 to attain her law degree, becoming the youngest in her class. She worked as an actress at a local theatre to fund her education. While at the university, she met her first husband, a journalist and poet named Abdel-Rahman El Abnoudy. Abdel's career gave Atteyyat access to a network of writers, poets, and other artists in Egypt. El Abnoudy comes from a working class background and struggled to afford the costs associated with university. She credits the political shift of Egypt in the Nasser era for opening the doors for more poor Egyptians to access education. El Abnoudy moved to Cairo for work and educational opportunities, and later attended the Cairo Higher Institute of Cinema for two years, with the majority of her learning focused on film theory. After making two films and desiring more filmmaking education, El Abnoudy spent three years at the International Film and Television School in London before returning to Egypt in 1976.

== Career ==
El Abnoudy played various roles at the theater, such as stage manager and assistant. In 1972 she attended the Cairo Higher Institute of Cinema to finish her film studies. While there, she created Horse of Mud, which was not only her first documentary, but also Egypt's first documentary produced by a woman.

El Abnoudy started her acting career as a means to financially support herself in school while she studied journalism. When El Abnoudy's career as a journalist began, she took a particular interest in the poor of Egypt, specifically Cairo. This later inspired her to take up production and become a filmmaker who shed light on the plight of some poor people in Egypt. El Abnoudy quickly became known by two titles: the "poor people's filmmaker" and the "mother of documentaries". She inspired many Arab women filmmakers to follow in her footsteps.

El Abnoudy's films are known for dealing with political, social, and economic issues in Egypt. They challenged the censored state of film during Egypt's Sadat era. El Abnoudy faced censorship and criticism from the Egyptian state and press for depicting poverty and struggle in her films. The censorship board sought to cut scenes out of her short films that were unflattering to Egyptian society, such as images of children with dirt on their faces or malnourished animals. El Abnoudy further contested the censorship of Egypt's filmmakers when she became the first female to establish her own production company, Abnoudy Film, which supported small filmmakers similar to her.

El Abnoudy's first film, House of Mud, received international attention and won a prize at the International Film Festival Mannheim-Heidelberg At the Francophone Film Festival. El Abnoudy received an Egyptian filmmakers first festival grand prize for her film Seas of Thirst at the 1985 edition of the Francophone Film Festival. In addition to directing films, El Abnoudy would serve as president of the International Short Film Festival Oberhausen's jury. She would go on to serve on multiple international juries, including at the Klibia Film Festival, Manheim Film Festival, and Egypt's Documentary Film and Short Subject Festival.

Her work received new interest during the 2011 Egyptian revolution and became further studied by Egyptian film archivists in Cairo. After her death, El Abnoudy’s films continued to be screened at film festivals around the world, particularly in programming dedicated to Arab women filmmakers.

== Directorial style ==
The emerging New Arab Cinema movement influenced El Abnoudy as a student filmmaker. She has also noted the influence of the non-commercialized decolonial Third Cinema movement during her time at the Cairo Higher Institute of Cinema. At the institute, she was exposed to short-form documentaries from visiting foreign instructors, which would become a signature of El Abnoudy’s style. The topics of her documentaries were influenced by her working-class upbringing and her knowledge of law and social justice.

El Abnoudy focuses on non-fiction documentaries, with her work being categorized under the genre of direct cinema due to her stylistic choice to portray realist depictions of Egypt’s working class rather than provide commentary. While making Horse of Mud, El Abnoudy described how she allowed her documentary subjects to direct and speak for themselves to promote realism and free personal expression. Her documentaries have also been described by El Abnoudy herself and scholars as examples of poetic realism. She primarily shot and edited her films herself on 16mm film, favouring its mobility and low cost. Her first digital film and her longest film at that time, was 1996’s Days of Democracy. El Abnoudy created both black and white and coloured films throughout her career.

== Personal life ==
El Abnoudy and her husband adopted their daughter when she was four years old from a friend. Around 1990, El Abnoudy and Abdel-Rahman El Abnoudy divorced after over 20 years of marriage, and she continued to live in Cairo with her daughter and seven cats.

She would continue to create films into the 1990s and 2000s before passing away in 2018 at the age of 78.

== Filmography ==
Credited As:
Year	Title	Director	Producer
1971	Horse of Mud	Yes	Yes
1972	Sad Song of Touha	Yes	Yes
1973	Jumble Sale	Yes	Yes
1974	Two Festivals in Grenoble	Yes	Yes
1975	al-Sandawich	Yes	Yes
1976	London Views	Yes	Yes
1979	To Move into Depth	Yes	Yes
1981	Seas of Thirst	Yes	Yes
1983	Permissible Dreams	Yes	No
1985	Rolla Tree	Yes	No
1988	Rhythm of Life	Yes	No
1989	Year of Maya	Yes	No
1990	Interview in Room No. 8	Yes	Yes
1992	Sellers and Buyers	Yes	No
1993	Diary in Exile	Yes	Yes
1994	Responsible Women	Yes	Yes
1995	Rawya	Yes	Yes
1995	Girls Still Dream	Yes	Yes
1996	Days of Democracy	Yes	Yes
1996	Egyptian Heroines	Yes	No
2000	Cairo 1000, Cairo 2000	Yes	No
2002	The Nubia Train	Yes	Yes
2004	Ethiopia through Egyptian Eyes	Yes	Yes

== Awards and nominations ==
- 1971, three international prizes at the Grand Prix Film Festival, Mannheim Film Festival and Damascus Film Festival.
- 1972, French Critics Prize at Grenoble Film Festival.
- 1990, Best Co-Production Prize, Valencia Film Festival, Spain.
- 1992, Egyptian Film Critics Prize, Ismailia International Documentary & Short Film Festival.
- 1998, Honoured, National Film Festival, Egyptian Ministry of Culture.
