= Kura (administrative division) =

Muslim term for areas under to Roman rule

Kura or koura (Arabic: كورة, romanized: Kūra) was a term used by Muslims to describe the political administrative units of Egypt, equivalent to the nomes of pre-Islamic times. These administrative units are smaller than the modern governorates of Egypt.

== In Egypt ==
The Arabized word kura is of Greek origin (Greek: χώρα; Latin: chora), meaning "territory" or "province". The kura is not exactly the same as the ancient pagarchy, because the kura refers to an administrative unit in general, while the pagarchy is a religious administrative unit. The Arabs also kept the names of these units, citing their Coptic origin, which was taken from the Pharaonic origin (not the Roman or Greek), after they distorted some of them and translated others in accordance with the Arabic language.

Ibn Duqmaq mentioned in his book Al-Intisar li-Wasita Aqd al-Amsar that the 33 kuras of Lower Egypt included the kuras of al-Hawf al-Sharqi, which are:

1. Ain Shams
2. Atreep
3. Temay
4. Bana
5. Basta
6. Torabia
7. Farbit
8. Sa
9. Al-Farma
10. Al-Arish

And the kuras of Batn al-Rif, which are:

1. Busir
2. Samannud
3. Noosa
4. Al-Awsiya
5. Al-Nujoom
6. Dakahla
7. Tinnis
8. Damietta

And the kuras of al-Jazira min asfal al-ard, which are:

1. Damsis
2. Menouf
3. Sakha
4. Baqira
5. Al-Bashroud

And the kuras of al-Hawf al-Gharbi, which are:

1. Sa el-Hagar
2. Shabas
3. Al-Batanon
4. Al-Khis wa al-Ashrak
5. Kharbata
6. Qartasa
7. Moseel
8. Ikhna
9. Rashid
10. Al-Buhayrah (includes Alexandria, Mariout, Lubia and Marakia)

As for the kuras of Upper Egypt, they are 22, which are:

1. Awsim
2. Memphis
3. Al-Sharqia (which is the land of Al-Atfihiyah)
4. Faiyum
5. Abusir
6. Dalas
7. Ahnas
8. Al-Qays
9. El-Bahnasa
10. Bwait
11. Taha wa Heiz Shenouda
12. Ala al-Ashmunayn
13. Asfal al-Ashmunayn wa Ansna
14. Manfalut
15. Syut
16. Qahquwa
17. Al-Dir wa Abshaya
18. Akhmim
19. Howa wa Faw wa Qena wa Dendera
20. Qift wa Luxor
21. Esna wa Armant
22. Aswan

The kura remained the chief administrative unit of Egypt well into the Middle Ages. It was not until the 1070s that the vizier Badr al-Jamali, the de facto ruler of the Fatimid Caliphate, abolished them and replaced them with 23 provinces (14 in Lower Egypt and 9 in Upper Egypt), which in broad outlines survive to the present day, as the Egyptian governorates.

== In al-Andalus ==
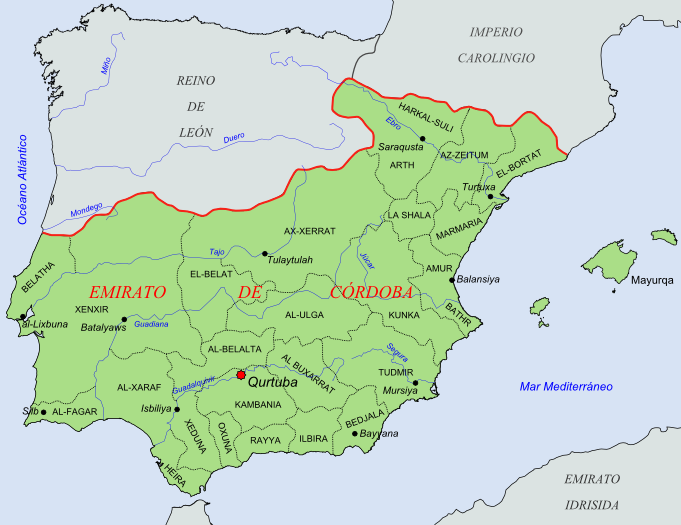
Kuras of the Emirate of Córdoba

The term was also used for the provincial districts of the Emirate of Córdoba, in al-Andalus. Some of them were originally "militarized zones" and they held contingents of soldiers. They were referred to as kūra mujannada.
