= El Kurdi =

El Kurdi الكردي
- Town
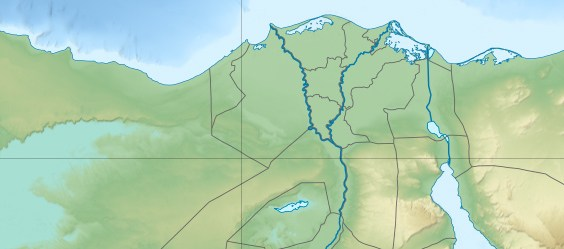
- Location in Lower Egypt
- Coordinates: 31.142893°N 31.78256°E
- Country: Egypt
- Governorate: Dakahlia Governorate

Area
  - Total: 12.8 km^{2} (4.9 sq mi)

Population (2023)
  - Total: 45,653
  - Density: 3,570/km^{2} (9,240/sq mi)
- Time zone: UTC+2 (EET)
  - Summer (DST): UTC+3 (EEST)

El Kurdi (Arabic: الكردي) is a city in Dakahlia Governorate of Egypt. It serves as the administrative center of a markaz of the same name.
