= Sherbin =

Sherbin شربين
- Town
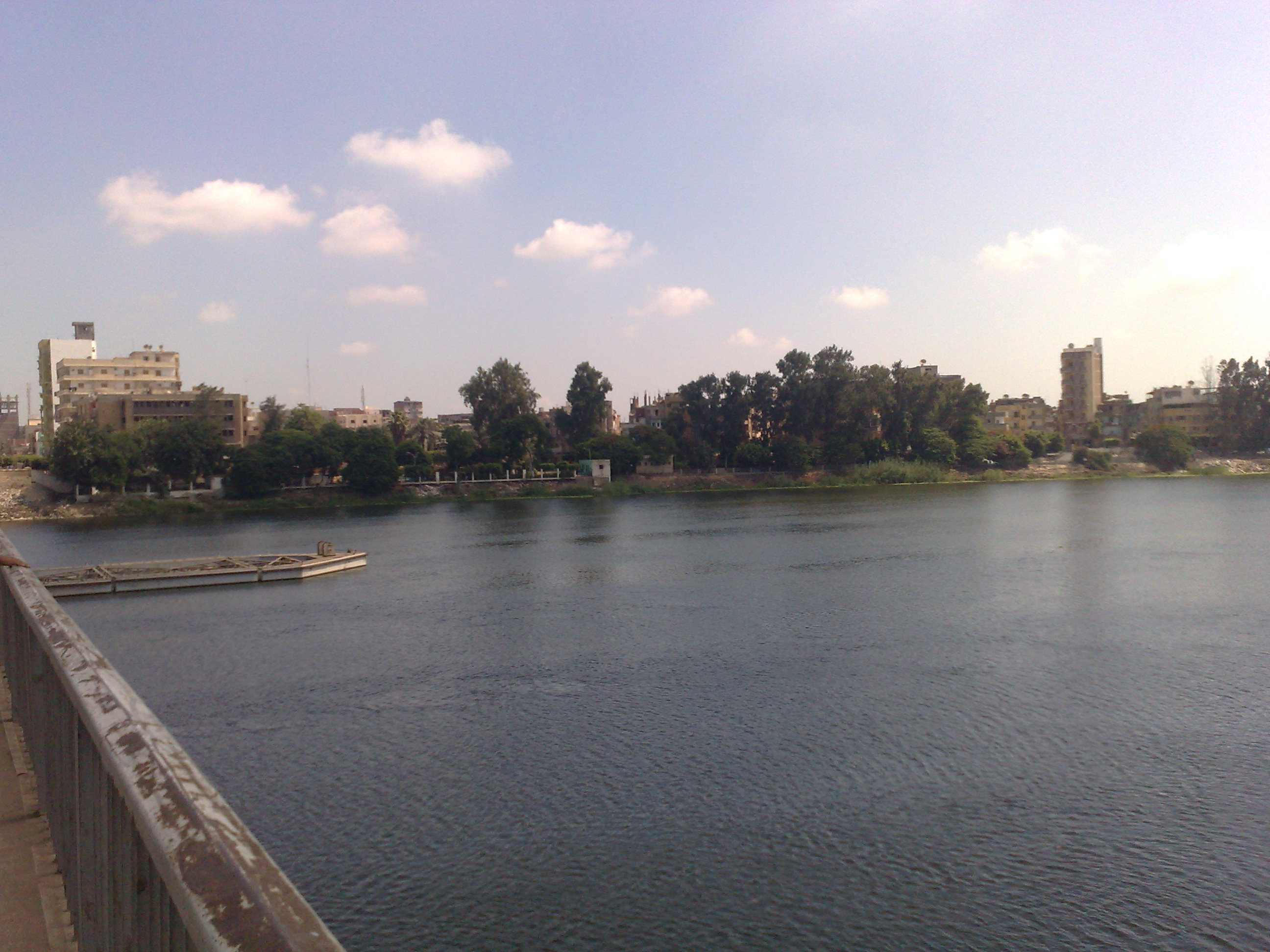

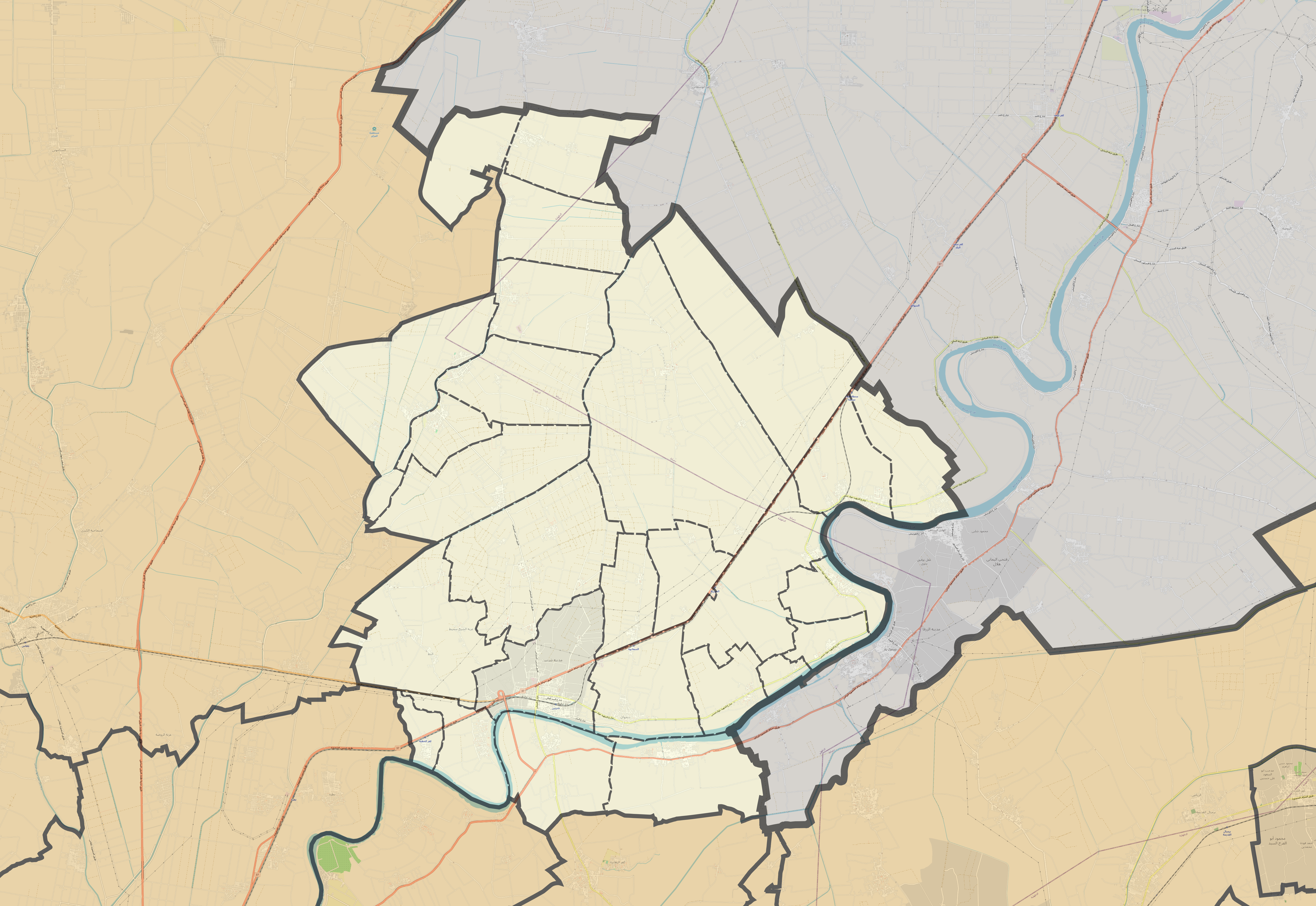
- Markaz of Sherbin (colored Green) in the Dakahlia governorate

- Location in Egypt
- Coordinates: 31.193889°N 31.524444°E
- Country: Egypt
- Governorate: Dakahlia
- Time zone: UTC+2 (EET)
  - Summer (DST): UTC+3 (EEST)
- Area code: 50

Sherbin (Arabic: شربين [ʃeɾˈbiːn]) is a town in Egypt, located in the governorate of Dakahlia.

== Etymology ==
The etymology isn't fully known, but the general consensus is that it's named Sherbin, which literally translates to 'Waterways,' because its situated between the Balamun canal and the Nile River.

== History ==
The area was home to the ancient town of Smabehdet, which is around nine kilometers away from the modern town.

Sherbin is one of the old towns of Egypt it was mentioned in the Dengawi works, It was also in the works of Al-Gharbiyyah as "شربين" (Arabic for Sherbin). And in Ottoman times it was part of the walayah of Gharbia. At 1826, Sherbin (and the surrounding areas) became a markaz known as "بلاد الأرز شرقا" (lit. Western Rice Countries) It was changed in 1871 to "مركز بلاد الأرز شرقا" (lit. Markaz of the Western Rice Countries) until finally at 1875 it was changed to the current name which is "مركز شربين" meaning Markaz of Sherbin.

== Markaz ==
Sherbin is a Markaz in Dakahlia, and it is subdivided further into one town (Sherbin), and several villages and settlements (قري or عزبات or اكفار)

| Name | Native Name |
|---|---|
| Sherbin | شربين |
| Mahallat Inshaq | محلة انشاق |
| Dinjaway | دنجواي |
| Busat Karim Al-Deen | بساط كريم الدين |
| Al-Hisas | الحصص |
| Al-Ayyadiyyah | العيادية |
| El-Shennawy | كفر الشناوي |
| Kafr El-Hatabah | كفر الحطبة |
| Kafr El-Dabbusi | كفر الدبوسي |
| Al-Ahmadiyyah | عزبة الأحمادية |
| Kafr El-Shiekh Ateya | كفر الشيخ عطية |
| Al-Awadiyyah | العوضية |
| Al-Dhariyyah | الضهرية |
| The Old Canal | كفر الترعة القديم |
| The New Canal | كفر الترعة الجديد |
| Ras El-Khaleej | رأس الخليج |
| Al-Sabriyyah | عزبة الصبرية |
| Al-Sabriyyah | عزبة السعدية |
| Abu Galal | أبو جلال |
| Al-Salam | السلام |
| Ghaneem | ترعة غنيم |
| Kafr Abu Dhahr | كفر أبو زاهر |
| Kafr El-Atrash | كفر ألأطرش |
| Kafr Youssef | كفر يوسف |
| El-Wekala | كفر الوكالة |
| Monshaat El-Nasr | كفر منشأة النصر |
| Al-Hajj Shirbini | كفر الحاج شربيني |

== See also ==
- List of cities and towns in Egypt
