= Mahallat Damana =

Mahallat Damana محله دمنه
- city
- Location in Egypt
- Coordinates: 31.075425°N 31.495885°E
- Country: Egypt
- Governorate: Dakahlia

Population (2020)
  - Total: 31,293
- Time zone: UTC+02:00 (EET)
  - Summer (DST): UTC+3 (EEST)

Mahallat Damana (Arabic: محله دمنه) is a city in the Dakahlia Governorate, Egypt. Its population was estimated at 31,000 people in 2020.
