= Dakhla =

Dakhla may refer to:

- Dakhla Oasis, Egypt
- Dakhla, Western Sahara
- Dakhla (refugee camp)

== See also ==
- Dakhla-Oued Ed-Dahab, a region of Morocco
- Dakahla, Egypt
