= El Salam Canal =

Canal in Egypt

Coordinates: 31°01′08″N 32°18′33″E

El Salam Canal (Arabic: ترعة السلام) is a canal built as a part of the Sinai Project. It starts at the Damietta branch of the Nile and stretches southwest towards Lake Manzala, then south to drain at El Sarow drainage. It then moves east and then again south to Hadoos drainage. It then moves east under the Suez Canal in four tunnels. It continues on the other side of the Suez Canal as the El-Sheikh Jaber canal.
