= George El Mozahem =

10th-century Coptic Orthodox saint

Saint George El Mozahem
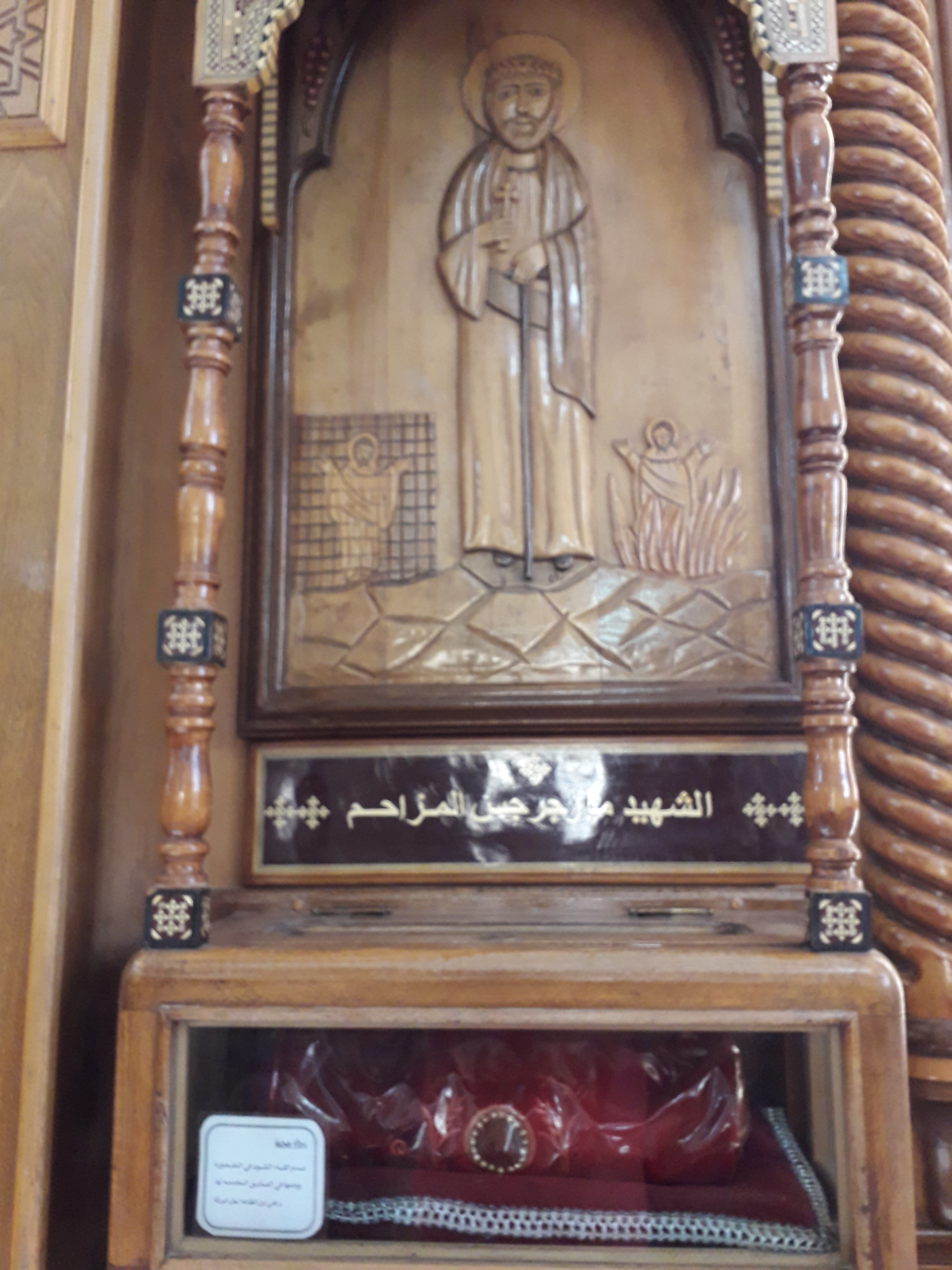
- دير الأنبا إبرام 15

Martyr
- Born: 940; Talkha, Egypt
- Died: 26 June 969 (aged 28–29); Egypt
- Venerated in: Coptic Orthodox Church
- Feast: 26 June (19 Paoni)

George El Mozahem (Coptic: ⲅⲉⲱⲣⲅⲓⲟⲥ ⲡⲓⲍⲟϩⲉⲙ; 940 – June 26, 969) is a Coptic Orthodox martyr and saint.

== Life ==
Born in Talkha, Egypt, as El-Mozahem to a Christian mother (Mary) and a Muslim father (Jumaa Al Atawi), He was raised in his father's religion until he reached the age of twelve. He used to go to church with his mother until he told her that he wanted to receive the holy sacraments of the Eucharist, She however told him that he could not unless he was baptized, and when he asked her to taste the blessed Eulogia bread (Qorban) he received it. It tasted sweet and he said "If the taste of this bread that was not consecrated by prayers tastes like this, what will be the taste of the Offering?" according to his hagiography. He tried to get baptized but priests were afraid of participating in such a dangerous act so he baptized himself by immersing himself three times. He later married a Christian woman and when he told her about his story she told him that his baptism was not accurate. They both fled to a city called Samanoud where he got baptized and was given a Christian name, George, because that day of his baptism was the feast of Saint George.

He and his wife lived together without any kind of marital relationship; then he was thinking of becoming a monk but he heard a voice telling him not to go to a monastery and encouraged him to seek martyrdom instead, He later was arrested for leaving Islam; he was burned but miraculously survived without harm, The governor of the area was very impressed and thought of freeing him but the people got angry and wanted to kill the governor, After the execution his wife received his relics; however, some Muslims tried to set his body on fire but it did not happen because God did not allow it, according to his hagiography.
