= New Sohag =

New Sohag سوهاج الجديدة
- City
- Location within Egypt
- Coordinates: 26°26′27.56″N 31°40′28.228″E
- Country: Egypt
- Governorate: Sohag

Population (2023-07-01)
  - Total: 201
- estimate
- Time zone: UTC+2 (EET)
  - Summer (DST): UTC+3 (EEST)

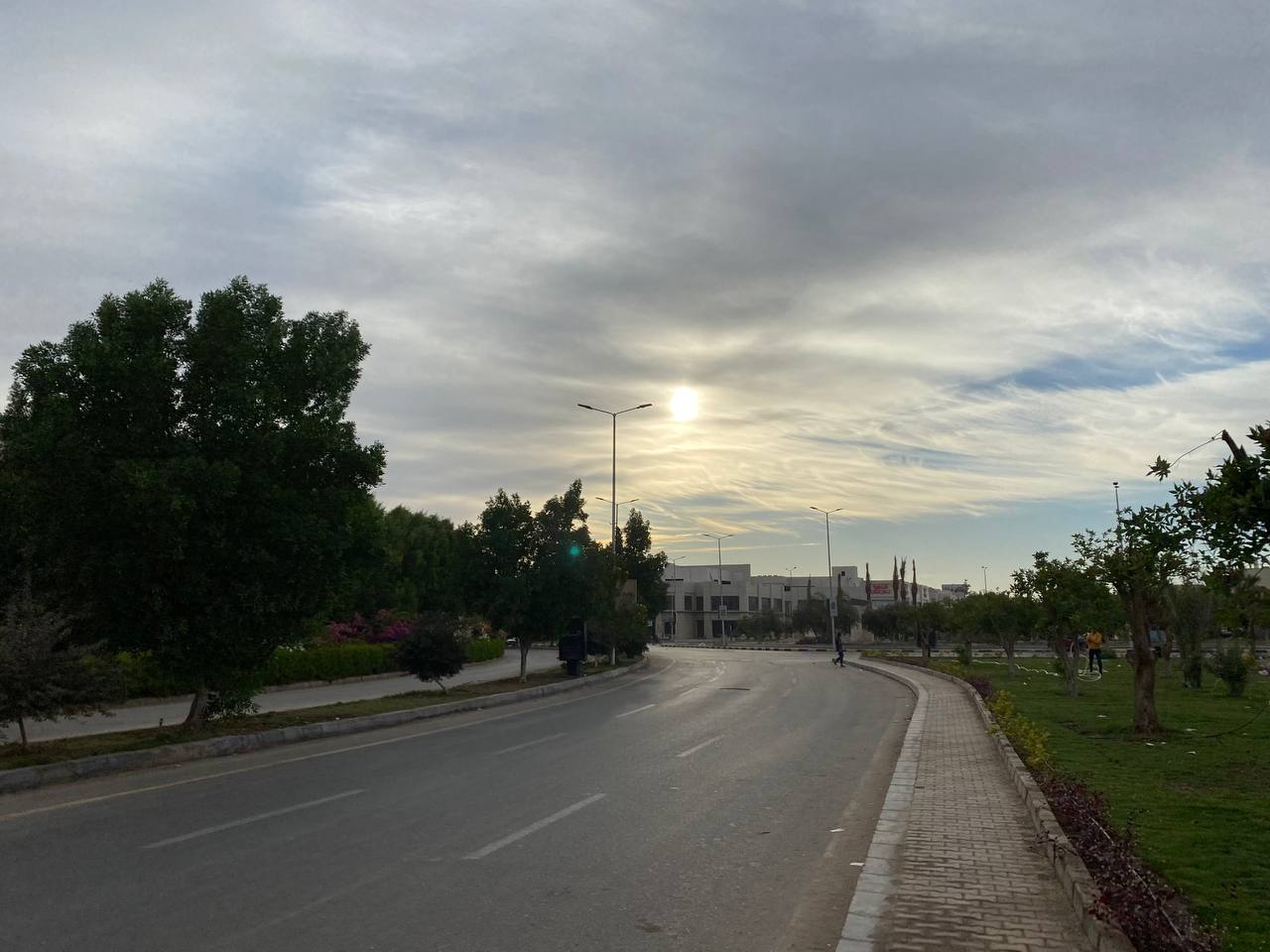
New Sohag

New Sohag (Arabic: سوهاج الجديدة) is a new Egyptian planned city of the third generation cities, was established by presidential decree No. 196 of 2000.

== See also ==
- List of cities and towns in Egypt
