= Mut, Egypt =

Mut موط
- City
- Location in Egypt
- Coordinates: 25.516667°N 29.166667°E
- Country: Egypt
- Governorate: New Valley

Area
  - Total: 35.3 km^{2} (13.6 sq mi)
- Elevation: 120 m (390 ft)

Population (2021)
  - Total: 26,820
  - Density: 760/km^{2} (1,970/sq mi)
- Time zone: UTC+2 (EET)
  - Summer (DST): UTC+3 (EEST)

Mut (Arabic: موط, from Ancient Greek: Μωθις or Ancient Egyptian: Mt) or Dakhla (Arabic: الداخلة), is a city in the New Valley Governorate, Egypt. Its population was estimated at 24,400 people in 2018.
