= Hassan Tobar =

Egyptian sheikh

Sheikh Hassan Toubar was a rich Egyptian Sheikh who fought the French during their campaign inside Egypt. He was the Sheikh of the city of El Manzala in Dakahlia Governorate. He was also considered the first official Egyptian millionaire. He led the uprising against the invaders in Damietta-Manzala-Mansoura area until fleeing to Gaza after the fall of Manzala to the French troops. He died soon after being allowed to get back to Manzala city in 1800, and until now the family of Toubar is still living in Al Manzala.

== Bibliography ==
Cole, Juan. Napoleon's Egypt: Invading the Middle East, Palgrave Macmillan; 1st edition, 2007.
