= Mit Salsil =

Mit Salsil ميت سلسيل
- City
- Location in Egypt
- Coordinates: 31.166667°N 31.8°E
- Country: Egypt
- Governorate: Dakahlia

Area
  - Total: 55.04 km^{2} (21.25 sq mi)

Population (2021)
  - Total: 79,957
  - Density: 1,453/km^{2} (3,762/sq mi)
- Time zone: UTC+2 (EET)
  - Summer (DST): UTC+3 (EEST)

Mit Salsil (Arabic: ميت سلسيل) is a city in the Dakahlia Governorate, Egypt. Its population was estimated at 47,000 people in 2020.

The old name of the city is Minyat Ibn Salsil (Arabic: منية ابن سلسيل, lit. 'abode of son of Salsil').
