= Magdi Mehanna =

Egyptian journalist (1956–2008)

- Born: 1956; Mit Ghamr, Dakahlia Governorate, Egypt
- Died: 2008 (aged 51–52); Cairo, Egypt
- Education: Cairo University, B.A.
- Occupation: Journalist

Magdi Mehanna (born Dakahlia Governorate, Egypt, 1956-2008) was an Egyptian journalist and the founding editor of Al-Masry Al-Youm newspaper, where he authored a column entitled "In the Forbidden Zone." He also presented a talk show with the same name on Dream TV. Before that, he worked as a reporter and columnist for the leftist Al-Ahaly and the liberal Al-Wafd.
