= Dakahla =

Dakahla دقهلة
- Village
- Interactive map of Dakahla
- Coordinates: 31°15′06″N 31°40′45″E
- Country: Egypt
- Governorate: Damietta

Dakahla or Daqahlah (Arabic: دقهلة; Coptic: Ⲧⲕⲉϩⲗⲓ) is one of the old villages of Damietta, Egypt. Egyptologist Jean-François Champollion stated that the village was located on the Phatnitic branch of the Nile delta and it was about 24 kilometers (15 miles) away from Tell el-Farma.

== History ==
The village of Dakahla, at the time of the Islamic conquest, was called Tkehli (تكيهلي), and It was located in a strategic position which allowed for great administration of the area, and It became the capital of a kūrah (nome) of the Caliphate at the time.

The village began declining at the end of the Fatimid period, and the capital of the area changed from Dakahla to Chemoun Erman (أشمون الرمان)

During Ottoman times, the village was part of the vilayet of Dakahlia, and at 1813 it was under the mudīriyyah of Dakahlia. Currently, it is part of the Governorate of Damietta.
