= New Nubariya =

New Nubariya النوبارية الجديدة
- Town
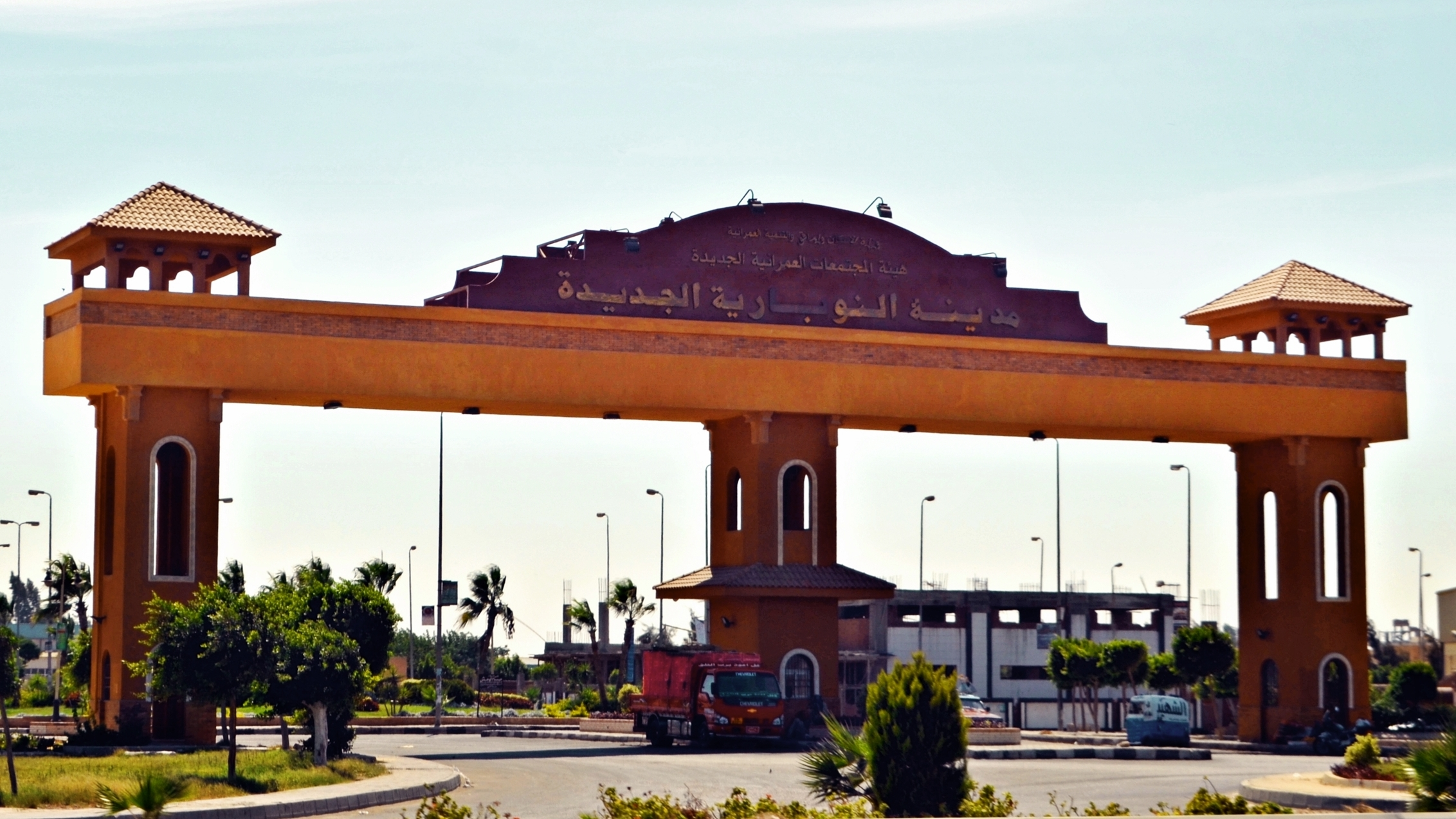
- Nubiriya City Entrance

- Location in Egypt
- Coordinates: 30°40′N 30°04′E
- Country: Egypt
- Governorate: Beheira
- Established: 1986

Area
  - Total: 9.2 sq mi (23.7 km^{2})
- Time zone: UTC+2 (EET)
  - Summer (DST): UTC+3 (EEST)

New Nubariya (Arabic: النوبارية الجديدة) is a town in Egypt, approximately 100 miles (160 km) north of Cairo.

New Nubariya consists of two residential areas, the first residential area has 960 housing units, and the second area hasa thousand units, and it contains three major mosques. During the year 2008, President Mohamed Hosni Mubarak launched the Build My Home project, which contributed to increasing the residential areas of the city, through the implementation of 3 neighborhoods named A, B and C on the western side of the Sumed pipeline to transport oil.

The settlement was founded in 1986 as part of an irrigation scheme using water from the Nile.

The population of the New Nubaria is 23,282 people, according to the 2021 official estimate.

In Nubaria city, there are a group of factories with different activities, such as agricultural crop packing and food processing.
