= Horse of Mud =

- Arabic: Husan al-Tin
- Directed by: Ateyyat El Abnoudy
- Color process: black and white
- Release date: 1971
- Running time: 12 minutes
- Country: Egypt
- Language: Arabic

Horse of Mud / Husan al-Tin / Cheval de Boue (1971) was the first film by Egyptian documentary filmmaker Ateyyat El Abnoudy. A short black and white documentary depicting women in a mud-brick factory, the film won the Grand Prize at the 1972 Damascus Film Festival, and prizes at the 1973 Grenoble Film Festival and Mannheim International Film Week.

== Production of the film ==
El Abnoudy made the film while studying at the Cairo Film Institute. The documentary depicts women in a mud-brick factory in the centre of Cairo, where the women are treated like 'horses', working at repetitive and monotonous tasks in miserable conditions. Nevertheless, El Abnoudy brings out the women's dignity, showing a beautiful choreography to their movement. By giving control of the microphone to the workers themselves, she also allows the women's own stories to be interleaved with their work.

== Reception ==
Horse of Mud attracted criticism within Egypt for its unflinching portrayal of the women's working conditions, and was banned there for being inspired by 'imported ideology'.
