= El Gamaliya =

El Gammaliya الجمَّالية
- City
- Location in Egypt
- Coordinates: 31°10′50″N 31°51′55″E
- Country: Egypt
- Governorate: Dakahlia

Area
  - Total: 18.5 km^{2} (7.1 sq mi)
- Elevation: 11 m (36 ft)

Population (2023)
  - Total: 101,302
  - Density: 5,480/km^{2} (14,200/sq mi)
- Demonym(s): Gamali (Male, Arabic: جمَّالي) Gamaliyah (Female, Arabic: جمَّالية)
- Time zone: UTC+2 (EET)
  - Summer (DST): UTC+3 (EEST)

El Gammaliya (Arabic: الجمالية) is a city in the Dakahlia Governorate, Egypt. Its population was estimated at 101,302 people in 2023.
