= Mudiriyah =

A mudiriyah (Arabic: مديرية, romanized: mudīriyya, lit. 'directorate'; plural: مديريات, romanized: mudīriyyāt), also known in English as mudirate and often translated as "province", is an administrative subdivision formerly used in Egypt and in Anglo-Egyptian Sudan, and still in use in Yemen. The Egyptian mudiriyat were subdivided into marākiz, or districts. In modern Egypt, these subdivisions were replaced by governorates (muhafazat).

== See also ==
- States of Sudan
