= El Senbellawein =

- City
- The Nile Delta

- Location in Egypt
- Coordinates: 30°52′47″N 31°28′10″E
- Country: Egypt
- Governorate: Dakahlia

Area
  - Total: 117.0 sq mi (302.9 km^{2})

Population (2021)
  - Total: 594,488
  - Density: 5,083/sq mi (1,963/km^{2})
- Time zone: UTC+2 (EET)
  - Summer (DST): UTC+3 (EEST)

El Senbellawein (Egyptian Arabic: السنبلاوين [es senbellæˈweːn, -sem-]) is a city in the Dakahlia Governorate of Egypt. Located about 20 kilometres (12 mi) south of Mansoura, it has a population of approximately 435,000 inhabitants.

The city has been home to well known people which include political activist Ahmed Lutfi el-Sayed, singer Umm Kulthum, actress Faten Hamama, first female general director of Egyptian TV Tomader Tawfik, footballer Mahmoud El Khatib, film director Ateyyat El Abnoudy, and geologist Farouk El-Baz.

== Etymology ==
The origin of the city's name is unknown. The ancient town Psembelle (Ancient Greek: Ψεμβελλη) is attested in the same nome, but it's unclear if the two are related.

== Projects ==
In 2018 the Egyptian Government began infrastructure projects in El Senbellawein.

== Climate ==
Köppen-Geiger climate classification system classifies its climate as hot desert (BWh), as the rest of Egypt.

Climate data for El Senbellawein
Month	Jan	Feb	Mar	Apr	May	Jun	Jul	Aug	Sep	Oct	Nov	Dec	Year
Mean daily maximum °C (°F)	18.5 (65.3)	19.6 (67.3)	22.5 (72.5)	26.5 (79.7)	31.6 (88.9)	33.1 (91.6)	33 (91)	33.3 (91.9)	31.8 (89.2)	28.9 (84.0)	24.7 (76.5)	20.2 (68.4)	27.0 (80.5)
Daily mean °C (°F)	12.4 (54.3)	13.2 (55.8)	15.7 (60.3)	19.1 (66.4)	23.4 (74.1)	25.6 (78.1)	26.6 (79.9)	26.7 (80.1)	25 (77)	22.7 (72.9)	19.1 (66.4)	14.3 (57.7)	20.3 (68.6)
Mean daily minimum °C (°F)	6.3 (43.3)	6.8 (44.2)	8.9 (48.0)	11.7 (53.1)	15.2 (59.4)	18.2 (64.8)	20.3 (68.5)	20.2 (68.4)	18.3 (64.9)	16.5 (61.7)	13.6 (56.5)	8.5 (47.3)	13.7 (56.7)
Average precipitation mm (inches)	11 (0.4)	7 (0.3)	6 (0.2)	3 (0.1)	3 (0.1)	0 (0)	0 (0)	0 (0)	0 (0)	4 (0.2)	7 (0.3)	9 (0.4)	50 (2)
Source: Climate-Data.org (altitude: 11m)

== Economy ==
Sinbellawein's economy is based on agriculture and services sectors, which it offers for many of the surrounding 282 villages that are under its administration. Car repairing and car tanks production also play a large role in the economy. Al Aseil Pasta& flour factory is producing most of the city needs. There is also Mag factory for making pipes.

== Transport ==
Auto rickshaw (tuk tuk) is a motor vehicle that is one of the chief modes of transport across El Senbellawein and small villages around it. There are also a station in the centre of the city which helps travellers to cities such as Cairo, Mansoura, Zagazig, and Mahalla. The station is also composed of 2 varieties:

1. Bus station which works only from 6:00 am till 4:00 pm
2. Micro-bus which nearly work till 1:00 am

== Notable people ==
- Ateyyat El Abnoudy, journalist and lawyer
- Faten Hamama, actress
- Mahmoud El Khatib, footballer
- Umm Kulthum, singer
- Ahmed Lutfi el-Sayed, academic and politician

== See also ==
- List of cities and towns in Egypt
- Manshiyat Ezzat: village located near the city
