= Khanka, Egypt =

Khanka الخانكة
- City
- Location in Egypt
- Coordinates: 30.160093°N 31.313349°E
- Country: Egypt
- Governorate: Qalyubiyya

Population (2018)
  - Total: 78,185
- Time zone: UTC+2 (EET)
  - Summer (DST): UTC+3 (EEST)

Khanka (Arabic: الخانكة) is a city in the Qalyubiyya Governorate, Egypt. The city lies north of Cairo. Its population was estimated at 78,000 people in 2018. The name of the city comes from a Persian word meaning "monastery, convent" (Persian: خانقاه, "xânqâh").
