= Thmuis =

Thmuis Tell el-Timai
- Location in Egypt
- Coordinates: 30°56′19″N 31°30′59″E
- Country: Egypt
- Time zone: UTC+2 (EST)
  - Summer (DST): +3

Thmuis (/ˈθmjuːɪs/; Greek: Θμοῦις), modern Tell et-Timai (Arabic: تل التيماي) was a city in Lower Egypt, located on the canal east of the Nile, between its Tanitic and Mendesian branches. Its ruins are near the modern city of Timayy al-Imdid.

== Geography ==
Its ruins are at Tell El-Timai, about five miles north-west of Sinbellawein, a station on the railway from Zagazig to Mansourah in the central Delta.

== History ==
=== Ptolemaic period ===
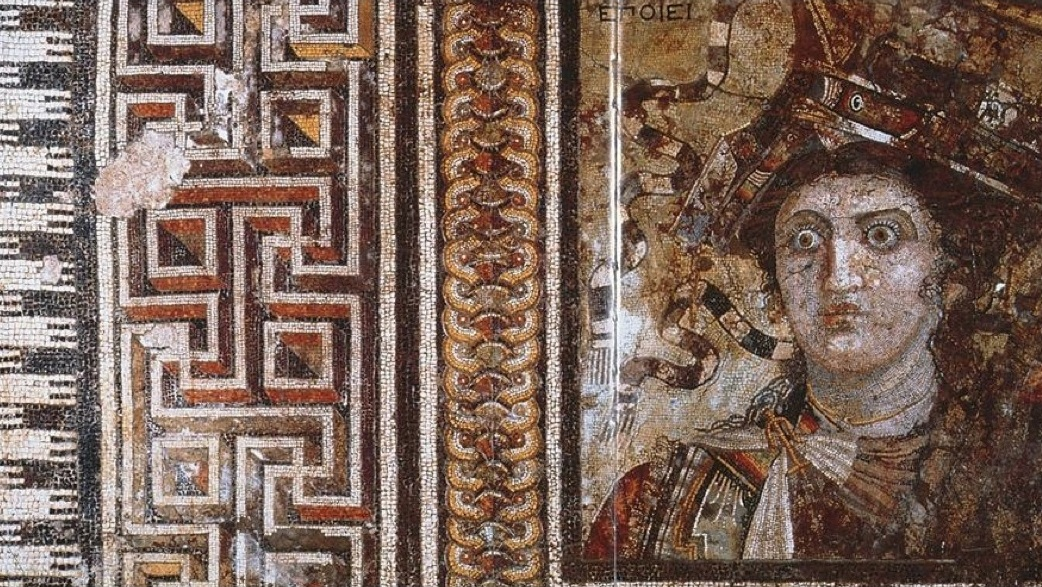
A mosaic from Thmuis, Egypt, created by the Hellenistic artist Sophilos (signature) in about 200 BC, now in the Greco-Roman Museum in Alexandria, Egypt; the woman depicted is the Ptolemaic Queen Berenike II (who ruled jointly with her husband Ptolemy III) as the personification of Alexandria, with her crown showing a ship's prow, while she sports an anchor-shaped brooch for her robes, symbols of the Ptolemaic Empire's naval prowess and successes in the Mediterranean Sea.

During the Ptolemaic period, Thmuis succeeded Djedet as the capital of Lower Egypt's 16th nome of Kha (Herodotus (II, 166)). The two cities are only several hundred meters apart. Ptolemy also states that the city was the capital of the Mendesian nome. From the Ptolemaic-Roman period are preserved the foundations of a temple.

Excavations uncovered deposits from a Hellenistic-era mud-brick building that was destroyed after 204 BC, as indicated by a coin cache of 13 bronze coins from the reigns of Ptolemy II, Ptolemy III, and Ptolemy IV. Evidence of burning on floors and vessels indicates that the building was destroyed in a fire. A second phase of the building continued in use after the destruction, before being destroyed by fire in the 1st century BC.

Excavations at the site also uncovered a midden containing remains of more than 70 ceramic bread molds. They were found adjacent to a large circular bread oven built into a mud-brick platform. They belong to an Egyptian type used since the Second Intermediate Period.

=== Roman period ===
Thmuis was an episcopal see in the Roman province of Augustamnica Prima, suffragan of Pelusium. Today it is part of the Coptic Holy Metropolitanate of Beheira (Thmuis & Hermopolis Parva), Mariout (Mariotis), Marsa Matruh (Antiphrae & Paractorium), Libya (Livis) and Pentapolis (Cyrenaica).

In the fourth century it was still an important Roman city, having its own administration and being exempt from the jurisdiction of the Prefect of Alexandria.

=== Islamic period ===
The site was in existence at the time of the Muslim invasion of Egypt in 642 AD, and was later called Al-Mourad or "Al-Mouradeh"; it must have disappeared after the Ottoman conquest of Egypt.

== Bishopric ==
Le Quien (Oriens christianus, II, 537) names nine bishops of Thmuis, the last three being Monophysites of the Middle Ages. The others are:

- Ammonius, Bishop of Thmuis, deposed by Heraclas of Alexandria (d. 247)
- Phileas of Thmuis, d. 306 (in the Martyrology, 4 February), martyr and saint
- Donatus, his successor, martyr
- Liberius (not Caius), at the First Council of Nicaea in 325
- Serapion of Thmuis, died shortly before 360, the author of various works, in part preserved, a friend of Athanasius
- Ptolemæus at the Council of Seleucia (359)
- Aristobulus, at the First Council of Ephesus (431).

== See also ==
- List of ancient Egyptian sites, including sites of temples

== Sources ==
- Herbermann, Charles, ed. (1913). "Thmuis" . Catholic Encyclopedia. New York: Robert Appleton Company.
- Baines & Malek "Cultural Atlas of Ancient Egypt", 2000. ISBN 0-8160-4036-2
- M.I. Bakr & H. Brandl, "Various Sites in the Eastern Nile Delta: Thmuis", in: M.I. Bakr and H. Brandl, with F. Kalloniatis (eds.), Egyptian Antiquities from the Eastern Nile Delta. Museums in the Nile Delta, vol. 2. Cairo/Berlin 2014, pp. 79, 294-301. ISBN 9783000453182.
