= Nabaruh =

- Town
- Location in Egypt
- Coordinates: 31°5′39″N 31°18′00″E
- Country: Egypt
- Governorate: Dakahlia

Population (2006)
  - Total: 38,953
- Time zone: UTC+2 (EET)
  - Summer (DST): UTC+3 (EEST)

Nabaruh is a city in Egypt, located in the governorate of Dakahlia. In 2006, it had a population of 38,953.
