= Talkha =

Talkha طلخا
- City
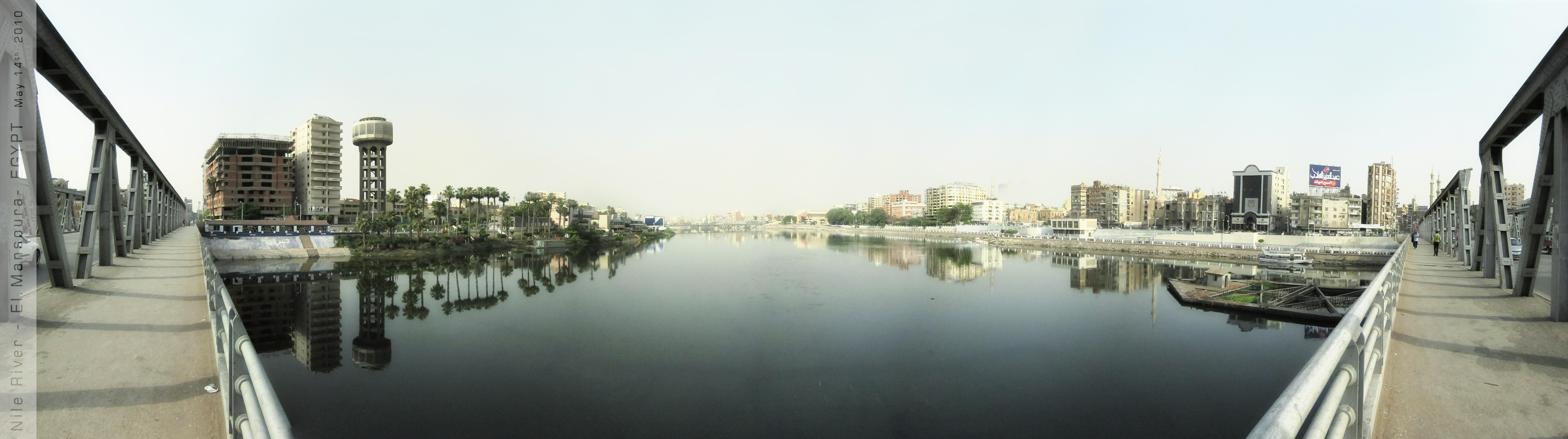
- Talkha (right) and Mansoura (left)

- Location in Egypt
- Coordinates: 31.054735°N 31.375644°E
- Country: Egypt
- Governorate: Dakahlia

Area
  - Total: 157.0 km^{2} (60.6 sq mi)
- Elevation: 18 m (59 ft)

Population (2021)
  - Total: 413,584
  - Density: 2,634/km^{2} (6,823/sq mi)
- Time zone: UTC+2 (EET)
  - Summer (DST): UTC+3 (EEST)
- Postal code: 35111
- Area code: 50

Talkha (Arabic: طلخا pronounced [ˈtˤɑlxɑ]) is a city in Dakahlia Governorate, Egypt. The city is located on the west bank of the Damietta, a distributary of the Nile in the Delta region. Is about 120 km northeast of Cairo. Talkha is situated opposite the city of Mansoura on the Damietta. Together, the two cities form an agglomeration.

Talkha contains the neighborhoods of Old Market, El Maalamein, Ar Rouda, El Sharifa, and El Muhandisin.

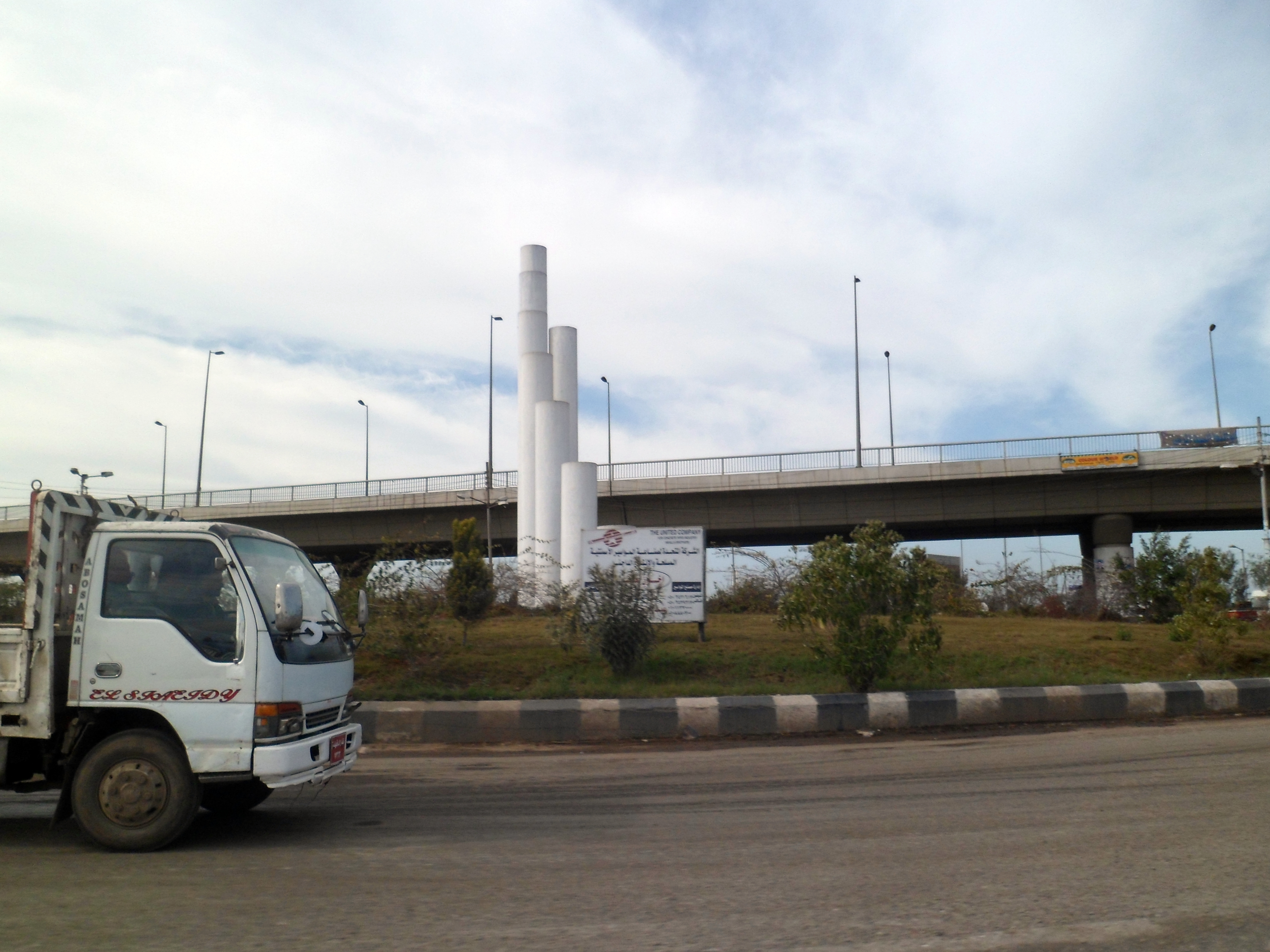
Roads in Talkha

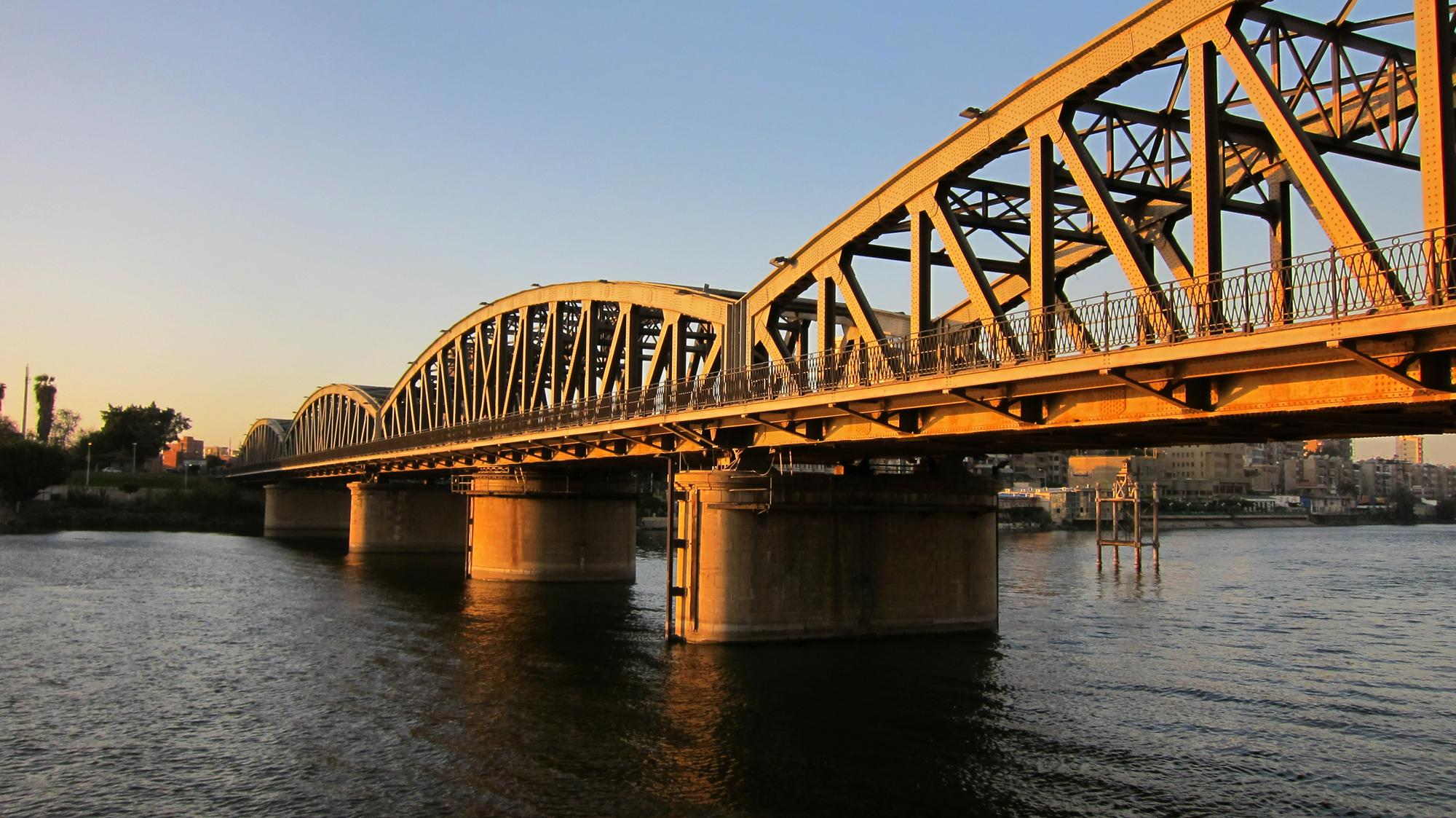
Railway bridge between Talkha and Mansoura

== Geography ==
=== Climate ===
Talkha is classified within the Köppen climate classification system as a hot desert (BWh).

Climate data for Talkha
Month	Jan	Feb	Mar	Apr	May	Jun	Jul	Aug	Sep	Oct	Nov	Dec	Year
Mean daily maximum °C (°F)	18.9 (66.0)	19.8 (67.6)	22.4 (72.3)	26.3 (79.3)	32 (90)	33 (91)	32.7 (90.9)	33.3 (91.9)	32 (90)	27.5 (81.5)	25 (77)	20.6 (69.1)	27.0 (80.6)
Daily mean °C (°F)	12.8 (55.0)	13.5 (56.3)	15.8 (60.4)	19.1 (66.4)	23.6 (74.5)	25.7 (78.3)	26.7 (80.1)	26.9 (80.4)	25.3 (77.5)	22.8 (73.0)	19.4 (66.9)	14.8 (58.6)	20.5 (69.0)
Mean daily minimum °C (°F)	6.8 (44.2)	7.3 (45.1)	9.2 (48.6)	11.9 (53.4)	15.2 (59.4)	18.4 (65.1)	20.7 (69.3)	20.5 (68.9)	18.7 (65.7)	17 (63)	13.9 (57.0)	9.1 (48.4)	14.1 (57.3)
Average precipitation mm (inches)	13 (0.5)	9 (0.4)	6 (0.2)	4 (0.2)	3 (0.1)	0 (0)	0 (0)	0 (0)	0 (0)	4 (0.2)	7 (0.3)	11 (0.4)	57 (2.3)
Source: Climate-Data.org

== See also ==
- List of cities and towns in Egypt
