= Gogar, Egypt =

Gogar
- Town
- Location in Egypt
- Coordinates: 31.059259°N 31.356319°E
- Country: Egypt
- Governorate: Dakahlia
- Time zone: UTC+2 (EET)
  - Summer (DST): UTC+3 (EEST)
- Postal code: 35111
- Area code: 50

Gogar is a town in Egypt, located in the governorate of Dakahlia.
