= El Manzala =

El Manzala ⲡⲓⲙⲁⲛϫⲱⲓⲗⲓ المنزلة
- City
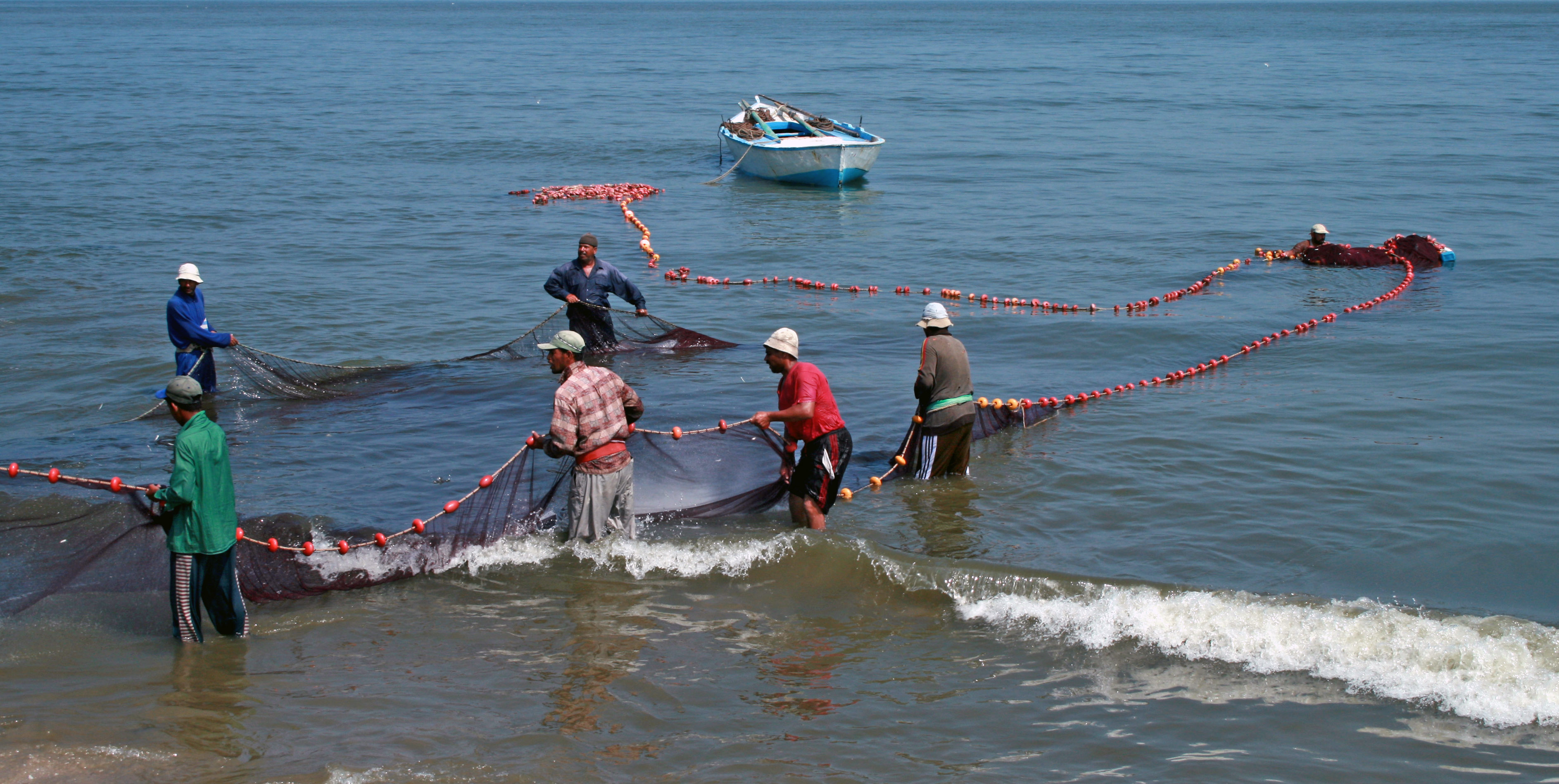
- Fishermen on Lake Manzala

- Location in Egypt
- Coordinates: 31°12′N 32°12′E
- Country: Egypt
- Governorate: Dakahlia

Area
  - Total: 50.2 km^{2} (19.4 sq mi)
- Elevation: 10 m (33 ft)

Population (2023)
  - Total: 129,519
  - Density: 2,580/km^{2} (6,680/sq mi)
  - Ethnicities: Egyptians
- Demonym(s): Manzalawi (Male, Arabic: منزلاوي) Manzalawiyah (Female, Arabic: منزلاوية)
- Time zone: UTC+2 (EET)
  - Summer (DST): UTC+3 (EEST)

El Manzala (Arabic: المنزلة) is a city and region (markaz) in Egypt. Situated in the Dakahlia Governorate, it lies on the Lake Manzala coast in the northeastern part of the country.

== Etymology ==
The town's name comes from Lake Manzala which in turn derives from Arabic: نزل, romanized: nazala, lit. 'descend, stop, settle down'. In Middle Ages it was also known as pi-Manjōili (Coptic: ⲡⲓⲙⲁⲛϫⲱⲓⲗⲓ, lit. 'inn, lodging'), translated into Greek as Xenedokhou (Ancient Greek: Ξενεδόχου), thus making the modern Arabic name a translation of a Coptic one, where phonetic resemblance is only coincidental.

== Projects ==
In 2018 money was earmarked by the Egyptian Government for infrastructure projects in El Manzala.

== Divisions ==
El Manzala comprises villages such as:

- Arab Zidan
- Awlad Alam
- Awlad Bana
- Awlad Hana
- Awlad Nasser
- Awlad Nour
- Awlad Serag
- Awlad Soboor
- Bani Hilal
- El Ahmadiya
- El Amarna
- El Aziza
- El Basaila
- El Bosrat
- El Dakanwa
- El Dakanwa El Gedida
- El Forasat
- El Gideeda
- El Hawata
- El Nasaima
- El Orban
- El Qazaqiza
- El Sherifiya
- El Shibool
- El Sataita
- El Tawabra
- Ezbet El Belasi

== See also ==
- List of cities and towns in Egypt
