= Dakahlia Governorate =

Governorate of Egypt

Coordinates: 31°03′N 31°23′E

Dakahlia Governorate محافظة الدقهلية
- Governorate
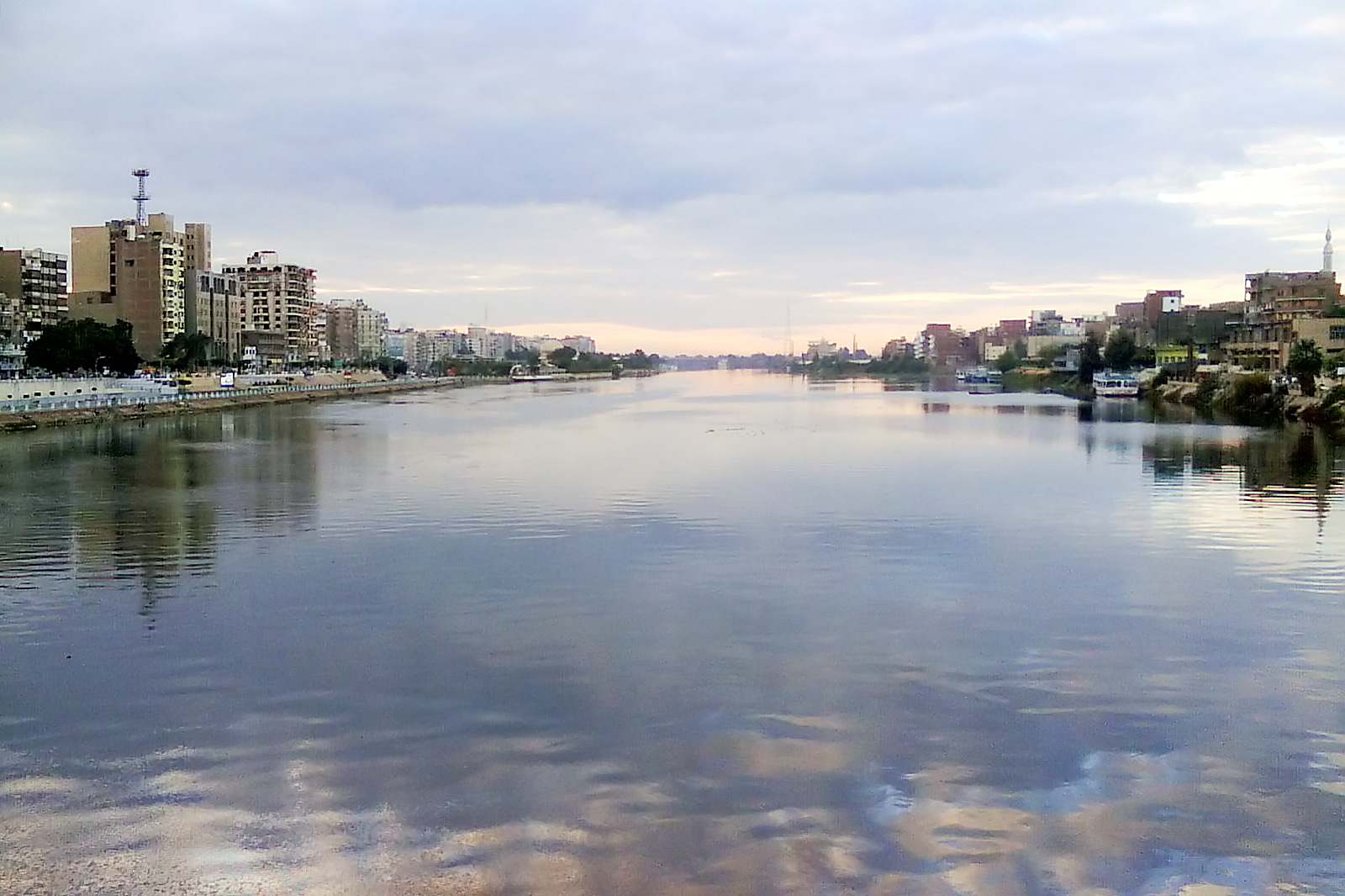
- Sunset in Mansoura with the Nile River

- Flag

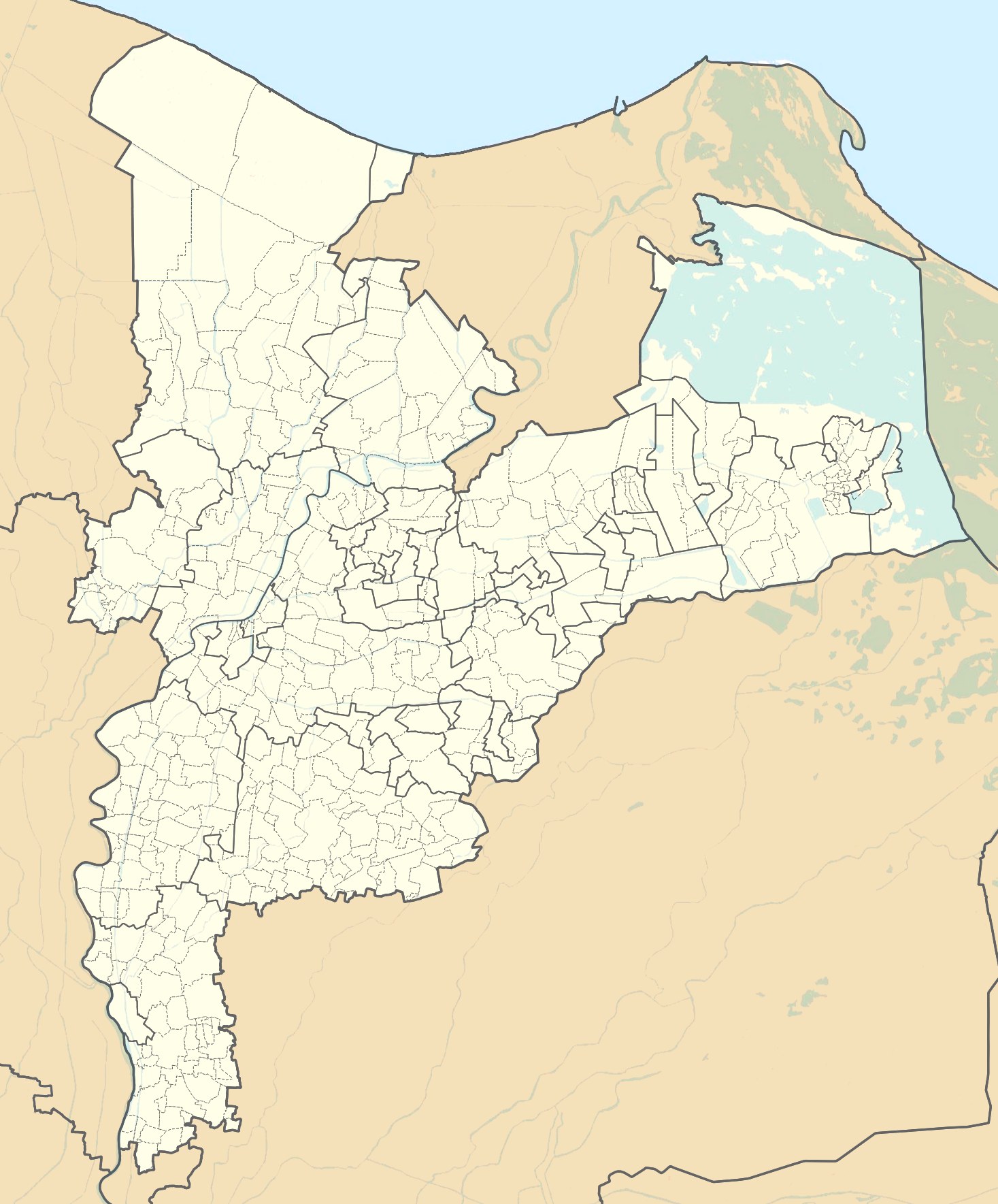
- Dakahlia Governorate subdivisions (Marakiz)

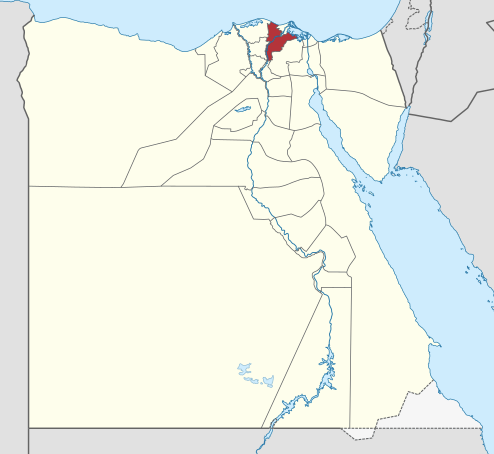
- Dakahlia Governorate on the map of Egypt
- Country: Egypt
- Seat: Mansoura (capital)

Government
  - Governor: Tarek Marzouk

Area
  - Total: 3,500 km^{2} (1,400 sq mi)

Population (January 2023)
  - Total: 7,013,271
  - Density: 2,000/km^{2} (5,200/sq mi)

GDP
  - Total: EGP 294 billion (US$ 18.7 billion)
- Time zone: UTC+2 (EET)
  - Summer (DST): UTC+3 (EEST)
- HDI (2021): 0.748 high · 7th
- Website: www.dakahliya.gov.eg

Dakahlia (Arabic: محافظة الدقهلية, romanized: Muḥāfaẓat al-Daqahliyyah, Egyptian Arabic pronunciation: [ed.dæʔæhˈlejjæ]) is an Egyptian governorate lying northeast of Cairo. Its area is approximately 3,500 square kilometres (1,400 mi^{2}). Although the capital of the governorate is Mansoura, it got its name from the ancient town of Daqahlah (دقهلة; from Coptic ⲧⲕⲉϩⲗⲓ 'shrine'), located in the modern Damietta Governorate.

== History ==
=== Archaeology ===
According to Egypt's Ministry of Tourism and Antiquities, in February, 2020, Egyptian archaeologists have uncovered 83 tombs dating back to 4,000 B.C, known as the Naqada III period. Various small pottery pots in different shapes, as well as some sea shells, makeup tools, eyeliner pots and jewels, were also revealed in the burial.

In April 2021, Egyptian archeologists announced the discovery of 110 burial tombs at the Koum el-Khulgan archeological site. Of these, 68 oval-shaped tombs date back to the Predynastic Period, while 37 rectangular-shaped tombs were from Second Intermediate Period. The rest of the tombs date back to the Naqada III period. The tombs also contained the remains of adults and a baby (buried in a jar), a group of ovens, stoves, remnants of mud-brick foundations, funerary equipment, cylindrical, pear-shaped vessels and a bowl with geometric designs.

=== Ancient era ===
Pharaonic monuments are scattered throughout the governorate, indicating that the region was inhabited during that era. Egypt was generally divided into provinces during the Pharaonic era, each with its own symbol and deity. The most prominent of these areas is what is now known as Tell el-Muqaddam, or what was known in ancient Egyptian as Umm Khent. It was the capital of Leontopolis, the Greek name for the 19th province in northern Egypt. Dakahlia includes a number of ancient archaeological mounds dating back to the Pharaonic era, including Tell el-Rub' in the Tama el-Amdid district, and the remains of the ancient city of Mendes, which served as the capital of Egypt during the 29th Dynasty. King Ahmose III built a great temple in the city, of which only a huge sarcophagus remains, considered the largest stone sarcophagus in Egypt. Stone remains of temples built by King Ramses II have also been found in the city. There is Tell Tama al-Amdid or Thamwis, which is part of Tell el-Rub' and contains artifacts from the 21st Dynasty. Tell el-Balamun in Sherbin belongs to the 17th district of Lower Egypt during the Ramesside period. The most important artifacts in this area are two masks of pure gold.

=== Medieval era ===
The name of Dakahlia Governorate dates back to the Fatimid era, referring to the town of Daqahlah, which was the base of the Manzala region. However, it disappeared due to the flooding of Lake Manzala. During the Al-Ruk al-Nasiri in 715 AH/1315 AD, Dakahlia disappeared from the administrative divisions, and the Manzala districts were incorporated into the districts of Al-Abwaniyah and Al-Murtahia. The Ashmun al-Ruman district was made the base of the region. During the Ayyubid era, the Battle of Mansoura took place in 1250 AD during the Seventh Crusade led by Louis IX, King of France, against Egypt. The objective was to remove Egypt from the Muslim-Crusader conflict so that it could recapture Jerusalem. After the fall of Jerusalem to the Muslims in 1244 AD, Louis prepared the campaign over three years, amassing approximately 80,000 fighters with a massive fleet. He occupied Damietta in 1249 AD, angering the Egyptians. Sultan al-Salih Ayyub died during the events, leaving Shajar al-Durr to assume the administration of the country, while Faris al-Din Aktai reorganized the army. Rukn al-Din Baybars proposed a plan to lure the Crusaders into Mansoura, where they were attacked by locals and soldiers inside the city's narrow streets, resulting in thousands of casualties and the entire cavalry division being wiped out. The battle ended in a crushing defeat for the Crusaders. Louis IX and a large number of his commanders were subsequently captured in the house of Ibn Luqman in Mansoura on April 6, 1250 AD, following his defeat at the Battle of Fariskur. He was later released for a hefty ransom of 400,000 dinars, with the promise not to return to Egypt. The battle marked a decisive turning point, halting the Seventh Crusade, preventing subsequent major campaigns against Egypt, and paving the way for the final liberation of the Levant from the Crusaders. In 933 AH/1527 AD, the Ottoman governor Hadım Suleiman Pasha issued a decree transferring the government office to Mansoura, which has since become the capital of Dakahlia Governorate and the headquarters of its offices to this day.

=== Modern history ===
After the French entered Egypt in 1798, Napoleon Bonaparte worked to subjugate the various provinces to ensure control and secure transportation routes. In the Dakahlia Governorate, strong popular resistance erupted, beginning in the city of Mansoura and the surrounding villages, where residents attacked the French garrison there. The village of Dandit was accused of participating in the Mansoura events and was subjected to an attack led by General Murat, who wreaked havoc. Despite this, the residents continued their resistance, prompting Napoleon to assign General Lanusse to support Murat in confronting this uprising. The residents of Dandit resorted to cutting bridges and flooding the land to impede the advance of the French forces. They then retreated to the village of Mit al-Farmawi, where they used two cannons in combat, before withdrawing to the hills to continue their resistance. These developments led to the retreat of the French forces towards Mit Ghamr. The movement was not confined to Dandit, but extended to neighboring villages and spread throughout the Dakahlia Governorate. Resistance intensified in the Little Sea area between Mansoura and Lake Manzala, a matter that alarmed Napoleon, given the region's importance in securing transportation between Mansoura, Salihiya, and Bilbeis. The city of Manzala emerged as a major center of resistance, and among its leaders was Sheikh Hassan Tobar, whose name appeared in French reports as one of the most prominent instigators of the revolt. French forces sent a campaign led by Damas and Westing across the Little Sea to attempt to gain control, but they encountered difficulties and were forced to request additional reinforcements. Resistance also erupted in Sharqiya under the leadership of Mustafa Bey, the Amir al-hajj, who had called for revolt while Napoleon was in the Levant. This movement spread to Dakahlia, and in March 1799, after reaching the city of Mit Ghamr on the Nile, the rebels succeeded in seizing six of the seven ships en route to support Napoleon in his campaign. In response, Monsieur Dugas dispatched General Lanusse, who clashed with the rebels and burned Mit Ghamr and several neighboring villages.

Dakahlia Governorate witnessed stable administrative borders from ancient times until Muhammad Ali assumed power in 1805. In 1813, he ordered a survey of agricultural lands, which resulted in dividing the Dakahlia Governorate into two parts: the first half, comprising Dikirnis, Minyet el-Nasr, and Mansoura; and the second half, comprising Aga, Senbellawein, and Mit Ghamr. Talkha, Sherbin, and Bilqas remained part of the Gharbia Governorate. In March 1919, Mansoura witnessed peaceful demonstrations, which began on March 14 and ended peacefully. They were repeated on March 18, when British forces intervened and opened fire on the demonstrators, resulting in deaths and injuries. The British authorities justified the incident by describing it as "unrest," without mentioning any casualties. The village of Mit al-Qurashi, in the Mit Ghamr district, also witnessed a peaceful demonstration. A British force arrived by train and opened fire on the residents, killing approximately 100 people, including the son of the village mayor. During the revolution, Mit Ghamr declared its independence from the Egyptian Sultanate under the name "Sultanate of Mit Ghamr", led by Ahmed Bey Abdo. The independence lasted for about two weeks. Students and workers formed the National Guard, and residents maintained order without any attacks. Muslims and Christians participated in demonstrations together, affirming their unity. Meetings were held in mosques and churches for coordination. Railway lines were cut and train repair shops were paralyzed as workers joined the movement. The movement ended with the occupation of the city under the leadership of Mr. Shepheard.

In 1935, cities in Dakahlia Governorate participated in the national movement against the 1930 Constitution, which granted King Fuad I sweeping powers. The movement demanded the reinstatement of the 1923 Constitution. Major demonstrations erupted in Mansoura and spread to Mit Ghamr, Manzala, Sinbilawein, and Nubaro, led by students and supported by local residents. This participation reflected Dakahlia's prominent role in the Egyptian political movement at the time, and its close connection to demands for freedom and a constitutional monarchy.

With the July 1952 Revolution and the issuance of the Agrarian Reform Laws, radical border changes began, the most prominent of which was the April 16, 1955 Law, which annexed Talkha, Bilqas, and Sherbin to Dakahlia. This brought about a major transformation in the map of the governorate, as its lands extended to the middle of the Delta and on both sides of the Damietta branch to the Mediterranean Sea, granting it fertile, highly productive agricultural areas and enriching its economic position. Dakahlia has witnessed major administrative changes since the issuance of Law No. (191) of 1955 and the subsequent laws and decisions, as it lost significant parts of its fertile, highly productive agricultural lands, most notably: Deirb Negm Center (216 km²), which was annexed to Sharqia, Fareskur Center (150 km²), which was annexed to Damietta, and Kafr Shukr District and ten other districts (84 km²), which were annexed to Qalyubia, bringing the total lost by the governorate to approximately (499 km²). In contrast, Dakahlia gained new centers with large areas of prairie land (Talkha, Sherbin, and Bilqas) totaling 1,131 km². This represented a significant economic gain, given the potential for reclaiming and cultivating these lands and accommodating a number of small farmers coming from densely populated areas. The governorate subsequently underwent minor amendments, most notably Ministerial Decree No. (913) of 1978, which established the Menia El-Nasr Center after separating 22 districts from the Dekernes Center. The center officially began operating in 1982.

== Geography ==
Dakahlia Governorate is located in the northeastern part of Egypt, within the Nile Delta region. It is one of the most important governorates of Lower Egypt in terms of population density and agricultural and industrial activity. It is bordered to the north by Kafr El-Sheikh Governorate, to the northeast by Damietta Governorate, to the east by Sharqia Governorate, to the south by Qalyubia Governorate, and to the west by Gharbia Governorate. The Damietta branch—one of the two branches of the Nile River—passes through Dakahlia Governorate, making its lands among the most fertile agricultural lands in Egypt. It also overlooks part of Lake Manzala to the east, one of the largest natural lakes in the country, used for fishing. The governorate lies between latitudes 30.5° and 31.5° north and longitudes 30° and 32° east.

Dakahlia's terrain varies between flat agricultural lands irrigated by a network of canals and drains, and residential areas that combine rural and urban characteristics. The governorate includes major cities such as Mansoura – the administrative and cultural capital – Mit Ghamr, Dekernes, Talkha, Minya al-Nasr, and others. The governorate's climate is characterized by moderate winters and hot, humid summers. Temperatures range from warm for most months of the year to relatively cold in winter.

== Municipal divisions ==
The governorate is divided into several municipal divisions which in January 2023 had an estimated total population of 818,012. There may be both a kism and a markaz with the same name, as boundaries between the two often overlap.

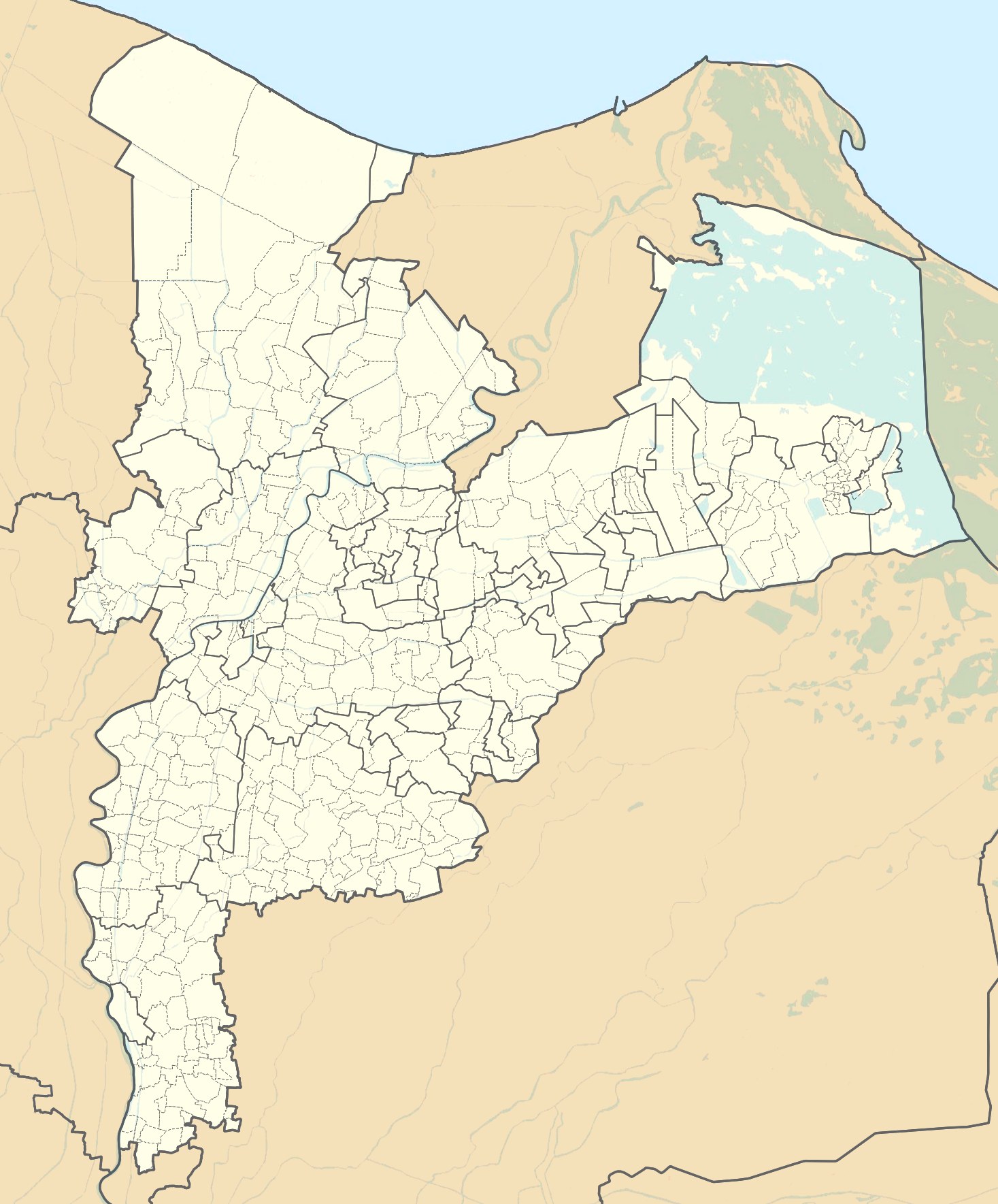
Municipal divisions of Dakhalia Governorate

Municipal Divisions
Anglicized name	Native name	Arabic transliteration	Population (January 2023 Est.)	Type
Aga	مركز أجا	Agā	567,756	Markaz
El Gamaliya	مركز الجمالية	Al-Gamāliyah	138,291	Markaz
El Kurdi	قسم الكردى	Al-Kurdi	45,592	Kism (fully urban)
El Mansoura	مركز المنصورة	Al-Manṣūrah	650,178	Markaz
El Mansoura 1	قسم اول المنصورة	Al-Manṣūrah 1	360,534	Kism (fully urban)
El Mansoura 2	قسم ثان المنصورة	Al-Manṣūrah 2	270,948	Kism (fully urban)
El Manzala	مركز المنزلة	Al-Manzilah	360,649	Markaz
El Matareya	مركز المطرية	Al-Maṭariyah	202,191	Markaz
El Senbellawein	مركز السنبلاوين	As-Sinbillāwayn	605,340	Markaz
Beni Ebeid	مركز بنى عبيد	Banī Ubayd	141,856	Markaz
Belqas	مركز بلقاس	Bilqās	568,532	Markaz
Dikirnis	مركز دكرنس	Dikirnis	379,591	Markaz
Gamasa	قسم جمصة	Gamaṣah	4,520	Kism (fully urban)
Maḥallat Damanah	مركز محلة دمنة	Maḥallat Damanah	67,665	Markaz
Minyet El Nasr	مركز منية النصر	Minyat an-Naṣr	287,468	Markaz
Mit Ghamr	قسم ميت غمر	Mīt Ghamr	156,109	Kism (fully urban)
Mit Ghamr	مركز ميت غمر	Mīt Ghamr	694,047	Markaz
Mit Salsil	مركز ميت سلسيل	Mīt Salsīl	73,417	Markaz
Nabaroh	مركز نبروة	Nabarūh	301,631	Markaz
Shirbin	مركز شربين	Shirbīn	454,737	Markaz
Talkha	مركز طلخا	Ṭalkhā	421,037	Markaz
Timay El Imdid	مركز تمى الأمديد	Timay al-Imdīd	209,103	Markaz

== Population ==
According to population estimates, in 2015 the majority of residents in the governorate lived in rural areas, with an urbanization rate of 28.2%. Out of an estimated 5,949,001 people residing in the governorate, 4,271,428 people lived in rural areas as opposed to 1,677,573 in urban areas. By 2018, the population had increased to an estimated 6,577,000.

== Overview ==
The Urology and Nephrology Center of Mansoura University Faculty of Medicine also features a renowned kidney center. Founded in 1983. Under the management of Dr. Mohamed A. Ghoneim.

== Cities and towns ==
- Aga
- Bilqas
- Dikirnis
- El Gamaliya
- El Kurdi
- El Matareya
- El Senbellawein
- Gamasa
- Gogar
- Mansoura
- Manzala
- Mit Elkorama
- Mit Ghamr
- Mit Salsil
- Nabaroh
- Sherbin
- Temay El Amdeed
- Talkha

== Industrial zones ==
According to the Governing Authority for Investment and Free Zones (GAFI), the following industrial zones are located in Dakahlia:

Zone name
Southwest Gamasa Industrial Zone
El Asafra Industrial Zone

== Notable people ==
=== Arts ===
- Ahmad Hasan al-Zayyat, writer and intellectual
- Anis Mansour, writer
- Ali Mahmoud Taha, romantic poet
- Adel Emam, movie and stage actor
- Faten Hamama, actress and producer
- Hassan el-Imam, film director
- Iman Mersal, poet
- Khaled El Nabawy, actor
- Mohamed Abla, artist
- Mahmoud Mokhtar, sculptor
- Naguib Surur, poet and playwright
- No'man Ashour, poet and playwright
- Ramy Essam, musician
- Sherif Mounir, movie and stage actor
- Umm Kulthum, legendary singer and songwriter

=== Journalists ===
- Ahmed Mansour (journalist)
- Mohamed Makhzangi, journalist and writer
- Mohammed Hussein Heikal, journalist, writer and politician
- Magdi Mehanna

=== Politics ===
- Ali Pasha Mubarak, one of the most influential and talented of Egypt's 19th century reformers
- Ayman Nour, politician
- Ahmed Gamal El-Din Moussa, former minister
- Ahmed Lutfi el-Sayed, intellectual, secularist and nationalist
- Abdel Latif Boghdadi, politician
- Khaled Ali, lawyer and Acitvist
- Khairat el-Shater, Islamic political activist
- Mohammed Mahdi Akef, former head of Muslim Brotherhood
- Mohamed Abdul Salam Mahgoub, politician
- Omar Abdel-Rahman, Muslim leader and activist
- Sami Hafez Anan, military officer
- Salah Nasr, former intelligence agency directory

=== Religion ===
- Gad el-Haq, former Grand Imam of Al-Azhar
- George El Mozahem, Coptic Orthodox martyr and saint
- Mohamed Metwally Al-Shaarawy, Islamic scholar
- Mahmud Abu Rayyah, Islamic scholar
- Mahmoud Zakzouk, academic and politician
- Shahat Muhammad Anwar, Quran reciter

=== Science ===
- Farouk El-Baz, space scientist
- Mohamed Ghoneim, urologist
- Saad Eddin Ibrahim, academic and sociologist
- Selim Hassan, Egyptologist

=== Sports ===
- Ōsunaarashi Kintarō (Abdelrahman Shalan) sumo wrestler
- Abdel-Zaher El-Saqqa, footballer
- Amr Marey, footballer
- Hussam El-Badrawi, sports shooter
- Mahmoud Fathalla, footballer
- Mahmoud El Khatib, footballer
- Mahmoud Abou El-Saoud, footballer
- Mohamed El Shamy (footballer, born 1996)
- Mimi El-Sherbini, footballer
- Salah Soliman, footballer
