= Aga, Egypt =

Aga
- Town and Markaz
- The Nile Delta

- Location in Egypt
- Coordinates: 30.941389°N 31.294161°E
- Country: Egypt
- Governorate: Dakahlia

Area
  - Town and Markaz: 233.2 km^{2} (90.0 sq mi)
  - Urban: 7.28 km^{2} (2.81 sq mi)
- Elevation: 12 m (39 ft)

Population (2023)
  - Town and Markaz: 571,430
  - Density: 2,450/km^{2} (6,346/sq mi)
  - Urban: 47,796
- Time zone: UTC+2 (EET)
  - Summer (DST): UTC+3 (EEST)
- Postal code: 35764
- Area code: 50

Aga (Arabic: أجا) is a town and markaz in Egypt, located in the governorate of Dakahlia. The town had an estimated population of 47,796 while the markaz, of which the town is the capital, had an estimated population of 571,430 in 2023.
