= Mendes =

Mendes Djedet
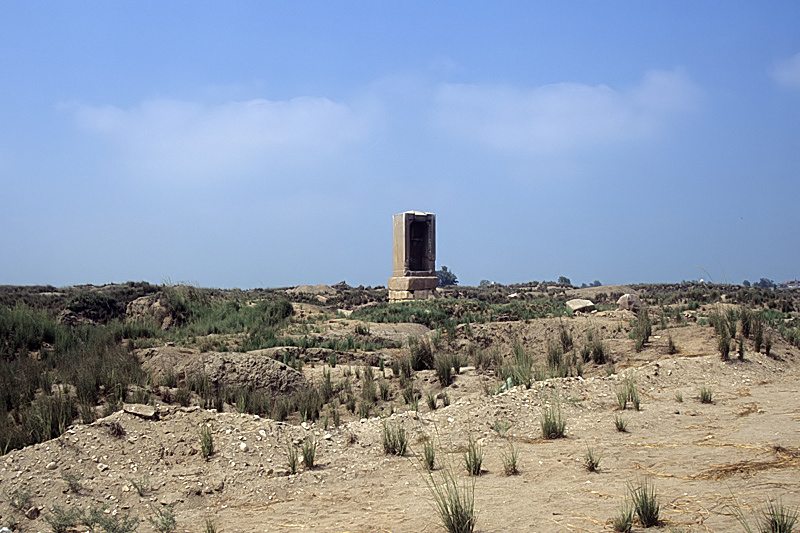
- Tell El-Ruba nowadays

- Location in Egypt
- Coordinates: 30°57′30″N 31°30′57″E
- Country: Egypt
- Governorate: Dakahlia Governorate
- Time zone: UTC+2 (EET)
  - Summer (DST): UTC+3 (EEST)

Mendes (Ancient Greek: Μένδης, gen.: Μένδητος), the Greek name of the ancient Egyptian city of Djedet, also known in ancient Egypt as Per-Banebdjedet ("The Domain of the Ram Lord of Djedet") and Anpet, is known today as Tell El-Ruba (Arabic: تل الربع).

The city is located in the eastern Nile Delta (30°57′30″N 31°30′57″E) and was the capital of the 16th Lower Egyptian nome of Kha, until it was replaced by Thmuis in Greco-Roman Egypt. The two cities are only several hundred meters apart. During the 29th Dynasty, Mendes was also the capital of Ancient Egypt, lying on the Mendesian branch of the Nile (now silted up), about 35 km east of al-Mansurah.

== History ==
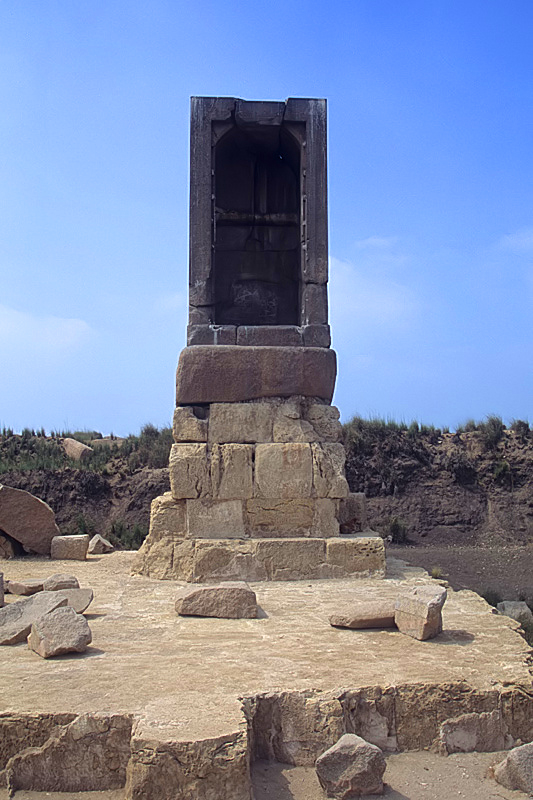
Naos of Amasis II at Tell El-Ruba (ancient Mendes)

Dd d t niwt
Djedet (ḏd.t)
in hieroglyphs

In ancient times, Mendes was a famous city that attracted the notice of most ancient geographers and historians, including Herodotus (ii. 42, 46. 166), Diodorus (i. 84), Strabo (xvii. p. 802), Mela (i. 9 § 9), Pliny the Elder (v. 10. s. 12), Ptolemy (iv. 5. § 51), and Stephanus of Byzantium (s. v.). The city was the capital of the Mendesian nome, situated at the point where the Mendesian arm of the Nile (Μενδήσιον στόμα, Scylax, p. 43; Ptol. iv, 5. § 10; Mendesium ostium, Pliny, Mela, ll. cc.) flows into the lake of Tanis. Archaeological evidence attests to the existence of the town at least as far back as the Naqada II period (4th millennium BCE). Under the first Pharaohs, Mendes quickly became a strong seat of provincial government and remained so throughout the Ancient Egyptian period. In Classical times, the nome it governed was one of the nomes assigned to that division of the native army which was called the Calasires, and the city was celebrated for the manufacture of a perfume designated as the Mendesium unguentum. (Plin. xiii. 1. s. 2.) Mendes, however, declined early, and disappears in the first century AD; since both Ptolemy (l. c.) and P. Aelius Aristides (iii. p. 160) mention Thmuis as the only town of note in the Mendesian nome. From its position at the junction of the river and the lake, it was probably encroached upon by their waters, after the canals fell into neglect under the Macedonian kings, and when they were repaired by Augustus (Sueton. Aug. 18, 63) Thmuis had attracted its trade and population.

== Religion ==
The chief deities of Mendes were the ram deity Banebdjedet (lit. Ba of the Lord of Djedet), who was the Ba of Osiris, and his consort, the fish goddess Hatmehit. With their child Har-pa-khered ("Horus the Child"), they formed the triad of Mendes.

The ram deity of Mendes was described by Herodotus in his Histories as being represented with the head and fleece of a goat: "...whereas anyone with a sanctuary of Mendes or who comes from the province of Mendes, will have nothing to do with (sacrificing) goats, but uses sheep as his sacrificial animals... They say that Heracles' overriding desire was to see Zeus, but Zeus was refusing to let him do so. Eventually, as a result of Heracles' pleading, Zeus came up with a plan. He skinned a ram and cut off his head, then he held the head in front of himself, wore the fleece, and showed himself to Heracles like that. That is why the Egyptian statues of Zeus have a ram's head, is why rams are sacred to the Thebans, and they do not use them as sacrificial animals. However there is just one day of the year—the day of the festival of Zeus—when they chop up a single ram, skin it, dress the statue of Zeus in the way mentioned, and then bring the statue of Heracles up close to the statue of Zeus. Then everyone around the sanctuary mourns the death of the ram and finally they bury it in a sacred tomb."

Demonologists in early modern times often imagined Satan as manifesting himself as a goat or satyr, because goats had a reputation for lustful behavior and were used in the iconography of pre-Christian gods like Pan and the goat of Mendes. The occultist Eliphas Levi in his Dogme et Rituel de la Haute Magie (1855) drew an image of the fictitious medieval idol Baphomet that conflated it with the goat of Mendes and the imagery of the Satanic satyr. The image of the satyr-like Baphomet and its supposed connection with Mendes has since been repeated by various occultists, conspiracy theorists, and neopagans.

== Ruins ==
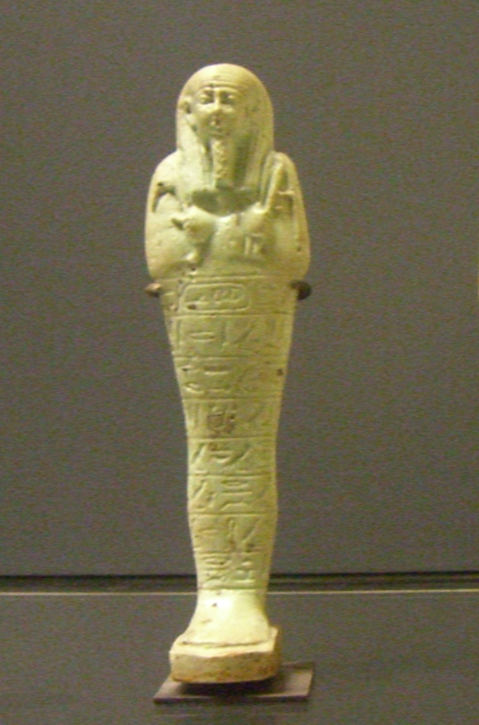
Ushabti of pharaoh Hakor, found at Mendes

The site is today the largest surviving tell in the Nile delta, and consists of both Tell El-Ruba (the site of the main temple enclosure) and Tell El-Timai (the settlement site of Thmuis to the south). Overall, Mendes is about 3 km long from north to south and averages about 900m east-to-west. An Old Kingdom necropolis is estimated to contain over 9,000 interments. Several campaigns of 20th-century excavations have been led by North American institutions, including New York University and the University of Toronto, as well as a Pennsylvania State University team led by Donald Redford. Under the direction of Redford, the current excavations are concentrating on a number of areas in and around the main temple.

Work on the New Kingdom processional-style temple has recently uncovered foundation deposits of Merenptah below the second pylon. It is thought that four separate pylons or gates existed. Evidence has suggested that their construction dates from at least the Middle Kingdom, as foundation deposits were uncovered. The original structures were buried, added to, or incorporated into later ones over time by later rulers.

A cemetery of sacred rams was discovered in the northwest corner of Tell El-Ruba. Monuments bearing the names of Ramesses II, Merneptah, and Ramesses III were also found. A temple attested by its foundation deposits was built by Amasis II. The tomb of Nepherites I, which Donald Redford concluded was destroyed by the Persians, was discovered by a joint team from the University of Washington and the University of Toronto in 1992–1993.

On the edge of the temple mound, a sondage supervised by Matthew J. Adams has revealed uninterrupted stratification from the Middle Kingdom down to the First Dynasty. Coring results suggest that future excavations in that sondage should expect to take the stratification down into the Buto-Maadi Period. The material excavated so far is already the longest uninterrupted stratification for all of the Nile Delta, and possibly for all of Egypt.

== See also ==
- List of ancient Egyptian towns and cities
- List of historical capitals of Egypt

== Notes ==
Preceded by Sais	Capital of Egypt; 399 – 380 BC	Succeeded by Sebennytos
