= Lake Manzala =

Lake in Egypt

- The Nile Delta

- Location within Egypt
- Coordinates: 31°16′N 32°12′E
- Type: Brackish
- Basin countries: Egypt

Lake Manzala (Arabic: بحيرة المنزلة baḥīrat manzala), also Manzaleh, is a brackish lake, sometimes called a lagoon, in northeastern Egypt on the Nile Delta near Port Said and a few miles from the ancient ruins at Tanis. It is the largest of the northern deltaic lakes of Egypt. As of 2008 it is 47 km (29 mi) long and 30 km (19 mi) wide.

== Etymology ==
The lake's name derives from Arabic: نزل, romanized: nazala, lit. 'descend, stop, settle down'. In Middle Ages it was also known as pi-Manjōili (Coptic: ⲡⲓⲙⲁⲛϫⲱⲓⲗⲓ, lit. 'inn, lodging'), translated into Greek as Xenedokhou (Ancient Greek: Ξενεδόχου), thus making the modern Arabic name a translation of a Coptic one, where phonetic resemblance is only coincidental.

== Geography ==
Lake Manzala is long but quite shallow. Although Lake Manzala's unaltered depth is only four to five feet (1.2 to 1.5 m), alterations to the depth were made during the construction of the Suez Canal to allow the Canal to extend 29 miles (47 km) lengthwise along the lake. Its bed is soft clay. Before construction of the Suez Canal, Lake Manzala was separated from the Mediterranean Sea by a strip of sand 200 to 300 yards (180 to 270 m) wide.

Port Said was established adjacent to Lake Manzala during the nineteenth century to support canal construction and related travel. The lake's location directly south of the Port Said Airport restricts the city's capacity for growth.

== Suez Canal ==
Lake Manzala is the northernmost of three natural lakes intersected by the Suez Canal, the other two being Lake Timsah and the Great Bitter Lake. Construction of the canal proceeded from north to south, reaching Manzala first. Due to the lake's shallowness, it was necessary to dig a banked channel for ships to pass.

== Ecology ==
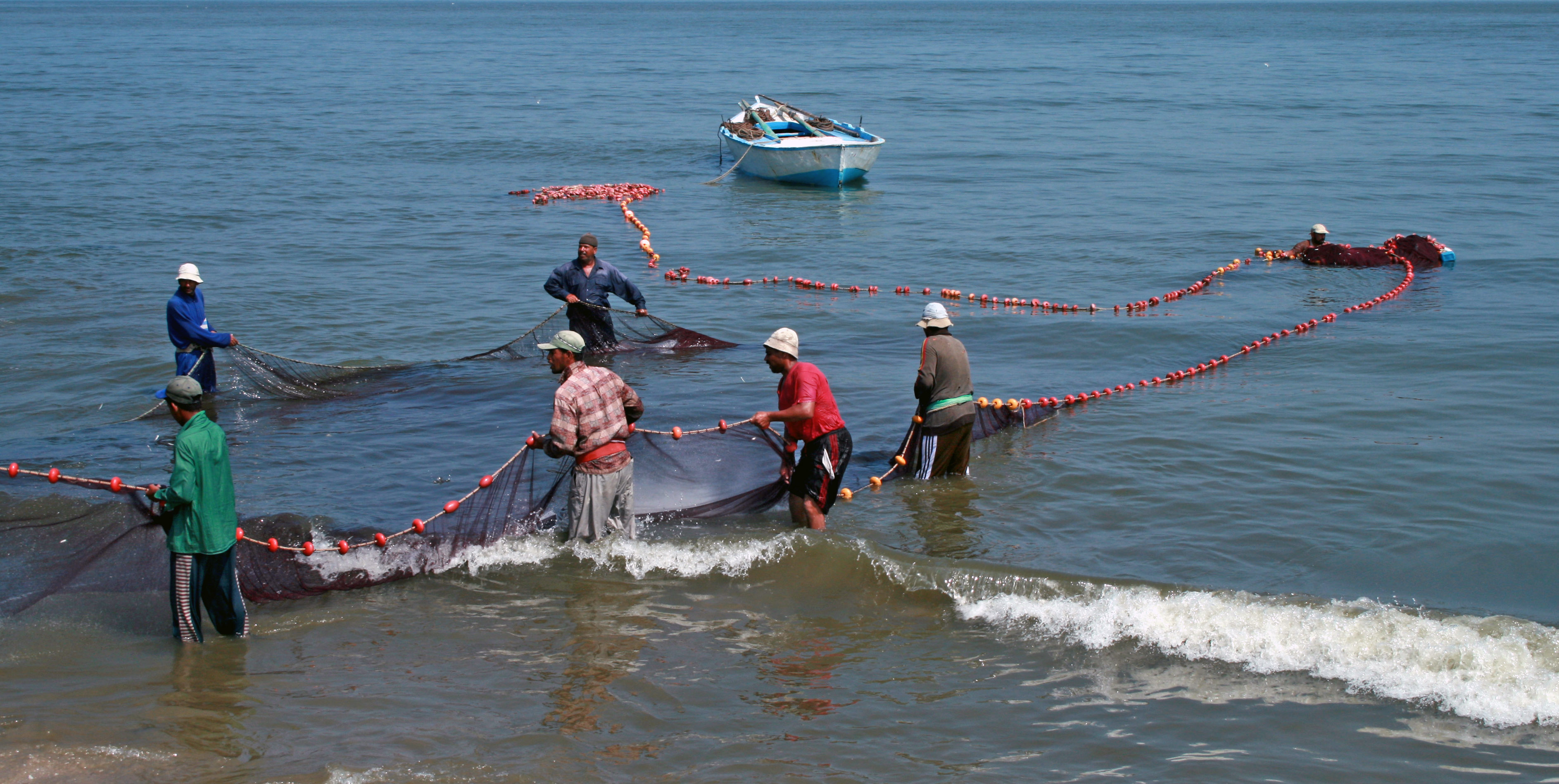
Fishermen at Lake Manzala

Lake Manzala served as a significant source of inexpensive fish for human consumption in Egypt, but pollution and lake drainage have reduced the lake's productivity. In 1985, the lakes fishery was an open area of 89,000 ha (220,000 acres) and employed roughly 17,000 workers. The government of Egypt drained substantial portions of the lake in an effort to convert its rich Nile deposits to farmland. The project was unprofitable: crops did not grow well in the salty soil and the value of resulting produce was less than the market value of the fish that the reclaimed land had formerly yielded. By 2001, Lake Manzala had lost approximately 80 percent of its former area through the effects of drainage efforts.
