= Markaz (administrative division) =

Type of second-level administrative division in the Middle East

Markaz (Arabic: مركز, Turkish: merkez, or the equivalent term in Persian), is a second-level or third-level administrative division found in the Middle East. Examples include:

- Markaz, below Governorates of Saudi Arabia
- Markaz, below Governorates of Egypt
- The capital city of a province of Iran
- A merkez is a district of Turkey (ilçe) that serves as the capital of a province

The word markaz (Arabic: مركز), as a term in Arabic, means "center".
