= Flag of Kafr El Sheikh Governorate =

Flag of Kafr El-Sheikh Governorate

The Flag of Kafr El-Sheikh Governorate is the official flag of Kafr El Sheikh Governorate in the northern Nile Delta in Egypt. It consists of a turquoise background centered with the coat of arms, which features a sailing ship in the Pharaonic style surrounded by two ears of grain and wavy lines; these elements carry historical, agricultural, and maritime connotations associated with the governorate.

== Detailed description and symbols ==
- Turquoise color (background): Used to denote the coastal maritime character and the governorate's location on the coast of the Mediterranean Sea.
- Pharaonic sailing ship: A symbol referring to the historical connection with the civilization of Ancient Egypt, and to both maritime and river activities (fishing and transport). The ship is also used as a memorial to the involvement of the governorate's inhabitants with naval forces in coastal battles throughout history.
  - It is noted that the sail contains:
    - The two ears of grain (or rice ears): Symbolize the agricultural importance of the governorate, especially the cultivation of rice, which constitutes a large part of the governorate's agricultural production.
    - The three interlocking rings: Symbolize the cooperative agricultural system among the people of the governorate.
- The three wavy lines below the ship: Represent the main bodies of water affecting the governorate: the Mediterranean Sea, Lake Burullus, and the Nile River, linking the maritime and agricultural dimensions.

== Colors ==
Colors	Turquoise	Gold	White	Dark Blue
RGB	48/213/200	255/215/0	255/255/255	0/0/139
Hexadecimal	#30D5C8	#FFD700	#FFFFFF	#00008B

== History and development of the flag ==
- The ship emblem is associated with the memory of the Battle of Burullus naval battle, which took place on 4 November 1956 in Egypt as part of the Tripartite Aggression against Egypt, and the governorate celebrates its victory over France on 4 November as a local national holiday.
- The design of the flag and emblem was adopted in 1960 as the official flag of the governorate, with minor modifications in the 1990s to match the current design.

== Usage of the flag and associated occasions ==
The flag and emblem are used in various contexts, including:

- The flag is flown on government buildings, administrative and local headquarters, schools, and government facilities in the governorate.
- The official seals of the governorate, alongside the seal of the state emblem (Eagle of Saladin).
- During official celebrations and the governorate's national day, and used as a visual element in informational materials and local visual identity.
- The celebration of the Battle of Burullus in November each year is usually accompanied by a symbolic display of the emblem and flag in local events highlighting the historical dimension and national vigilance of the coastal community.

== Gallery ==
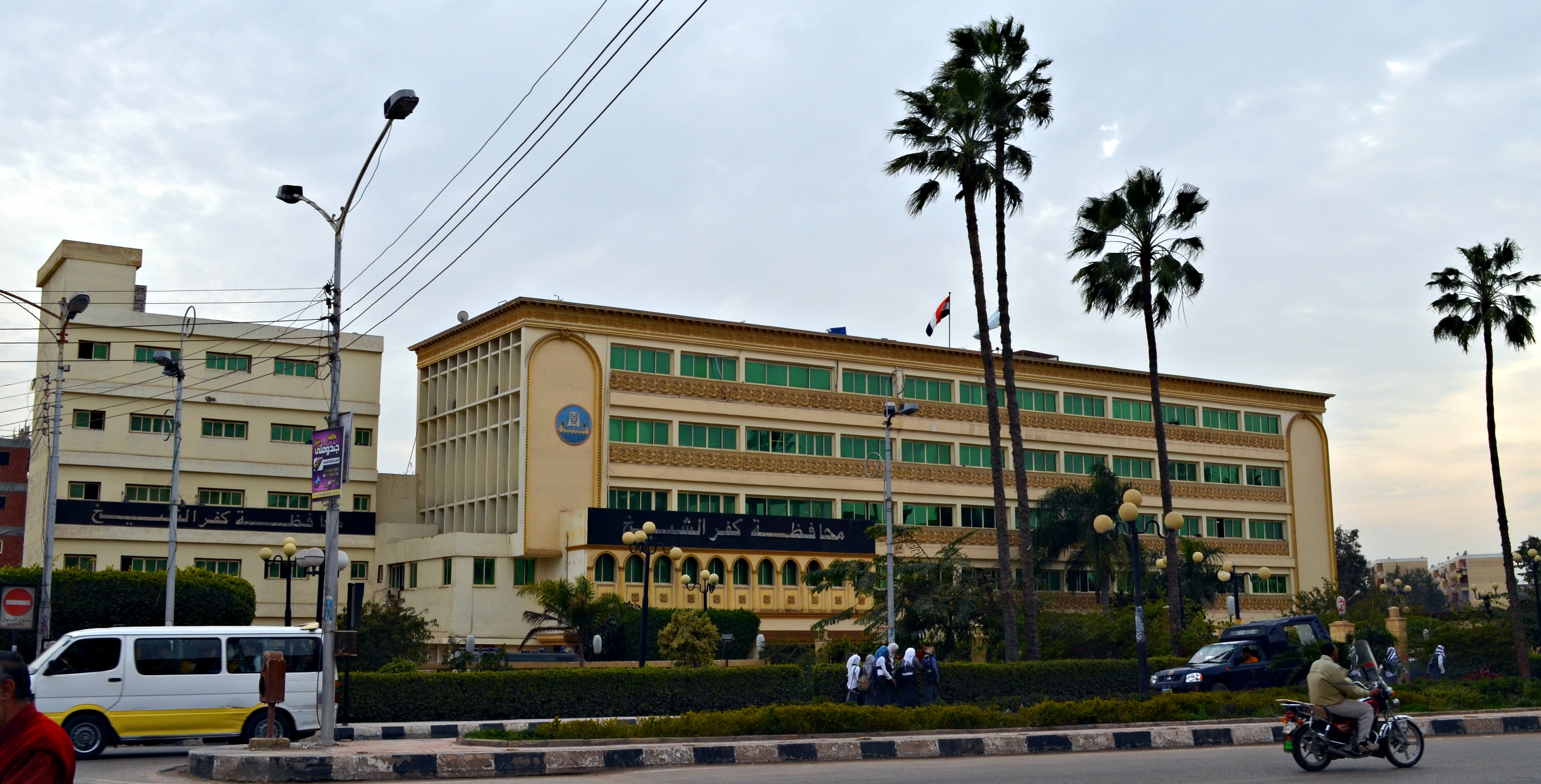
The governorate flag alongside the national flag, and the official emblem of the governorate on the facade of the main building of the governorate.

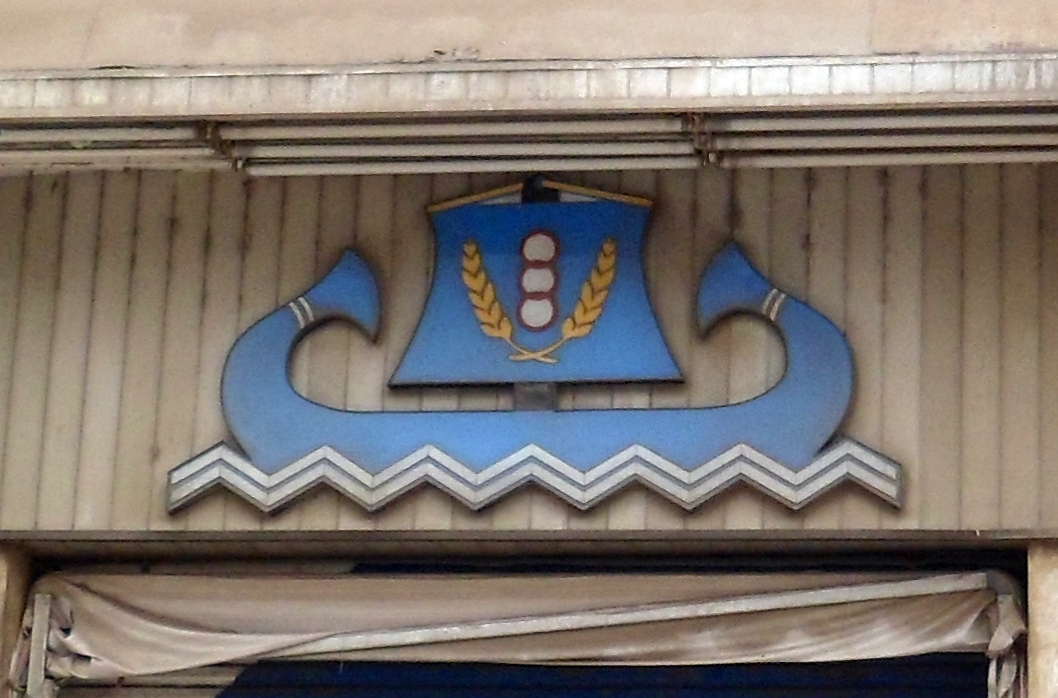
The governorate's emblem on a commercial shop in Kafr El Sheikh.

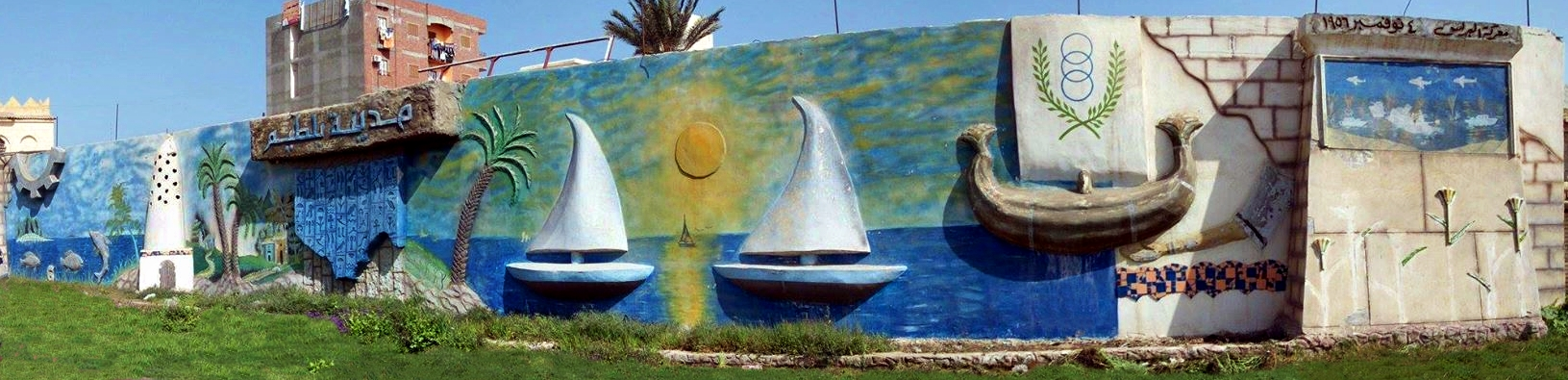
The governorate's emblem on a mural in the city of Baltim.

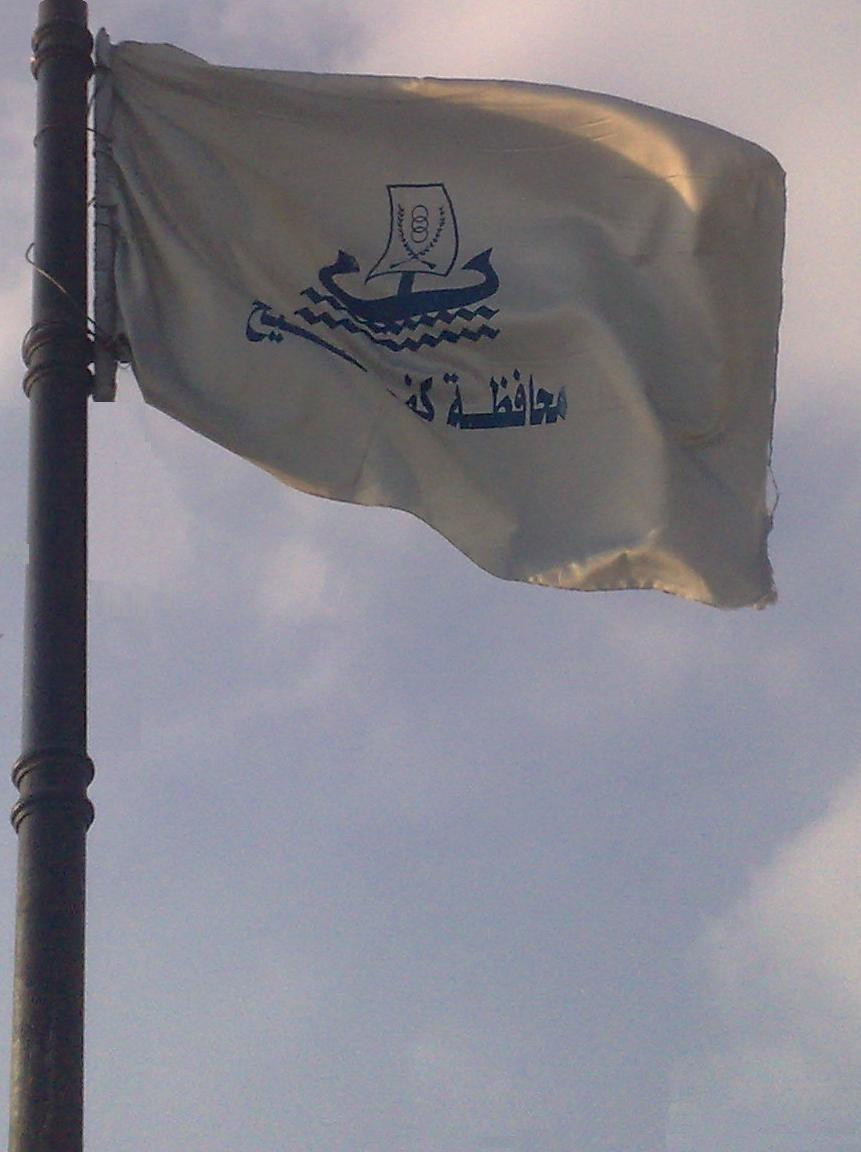
The flag raised on the Nile Corniche in the city of Desouk.

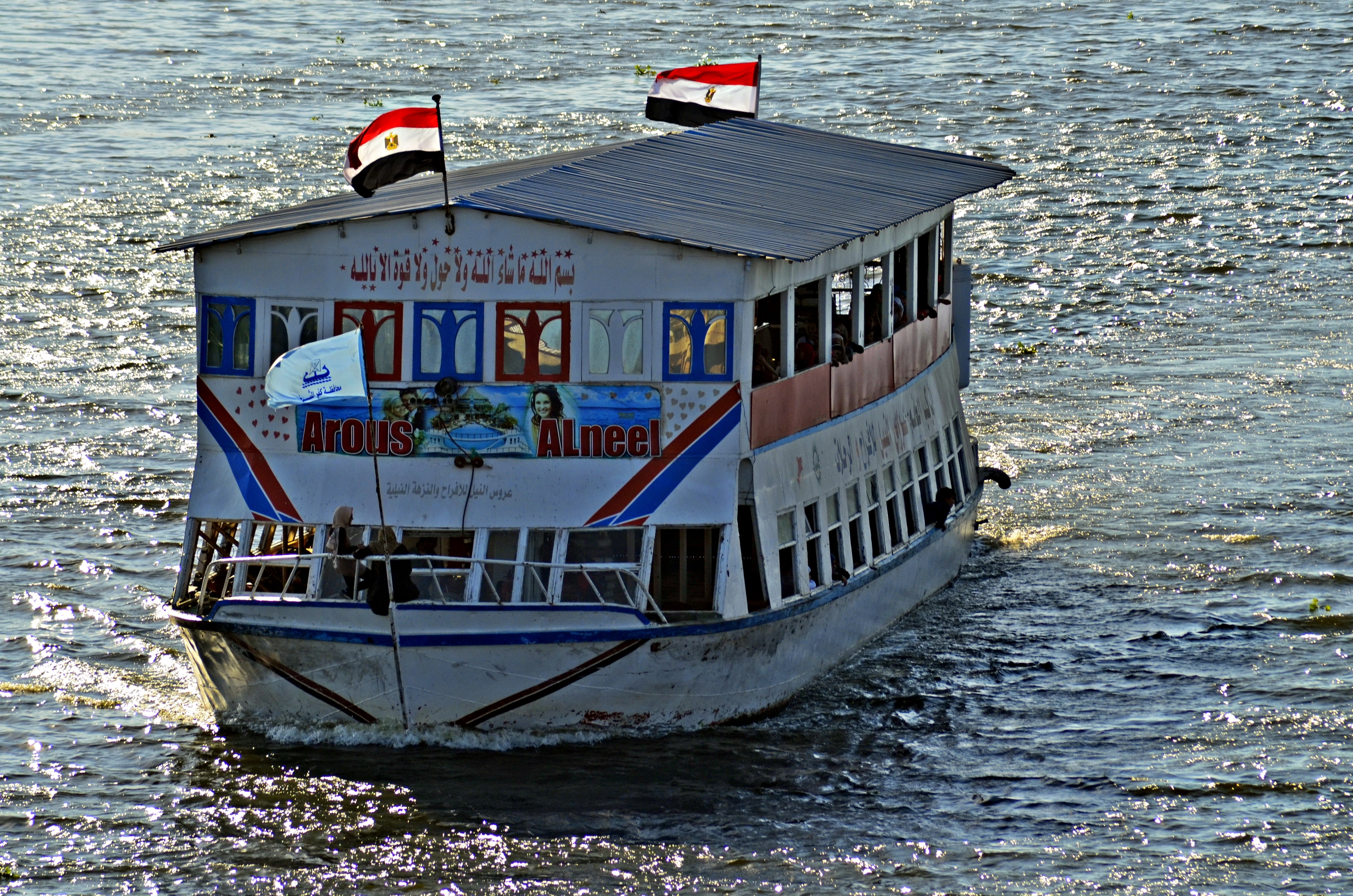
The governorate flag on the bow of the Arous El-Nile ship in Desouk city.

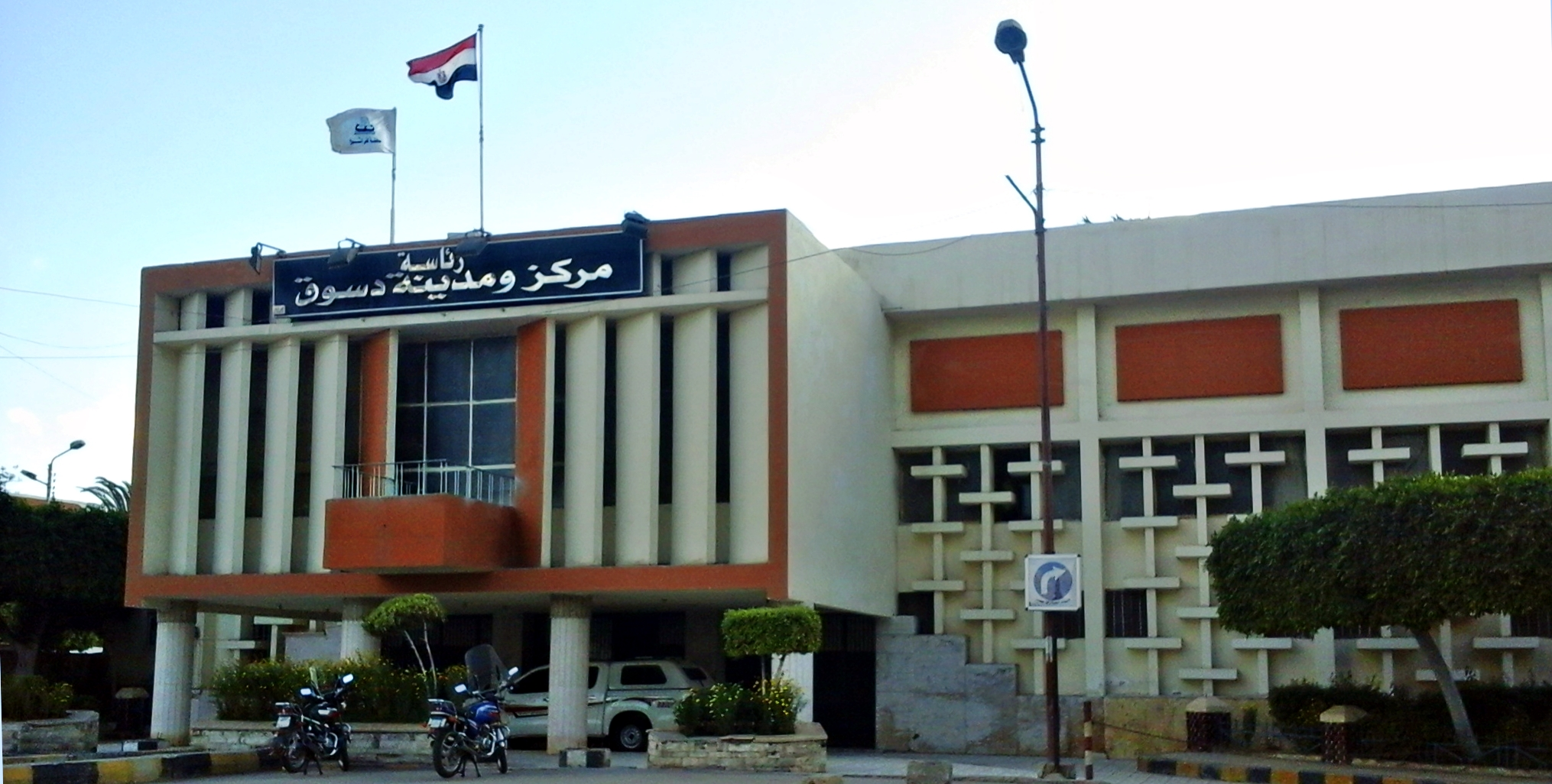
The flag atop the Desouk City Presidency building.

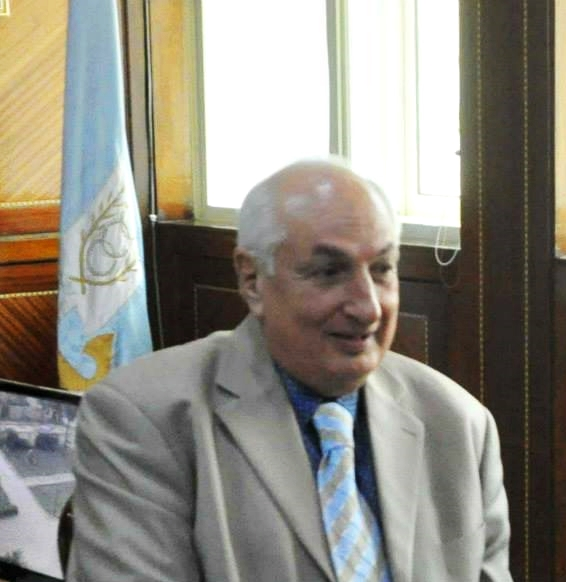
The flag behind former governor Mohammed Ezzat Agwa.

== See also ==
- Kafr El Sheikh Governorate
- Flag of Egypt
