= Demiana =

Coptic martyr

Saint Demiana
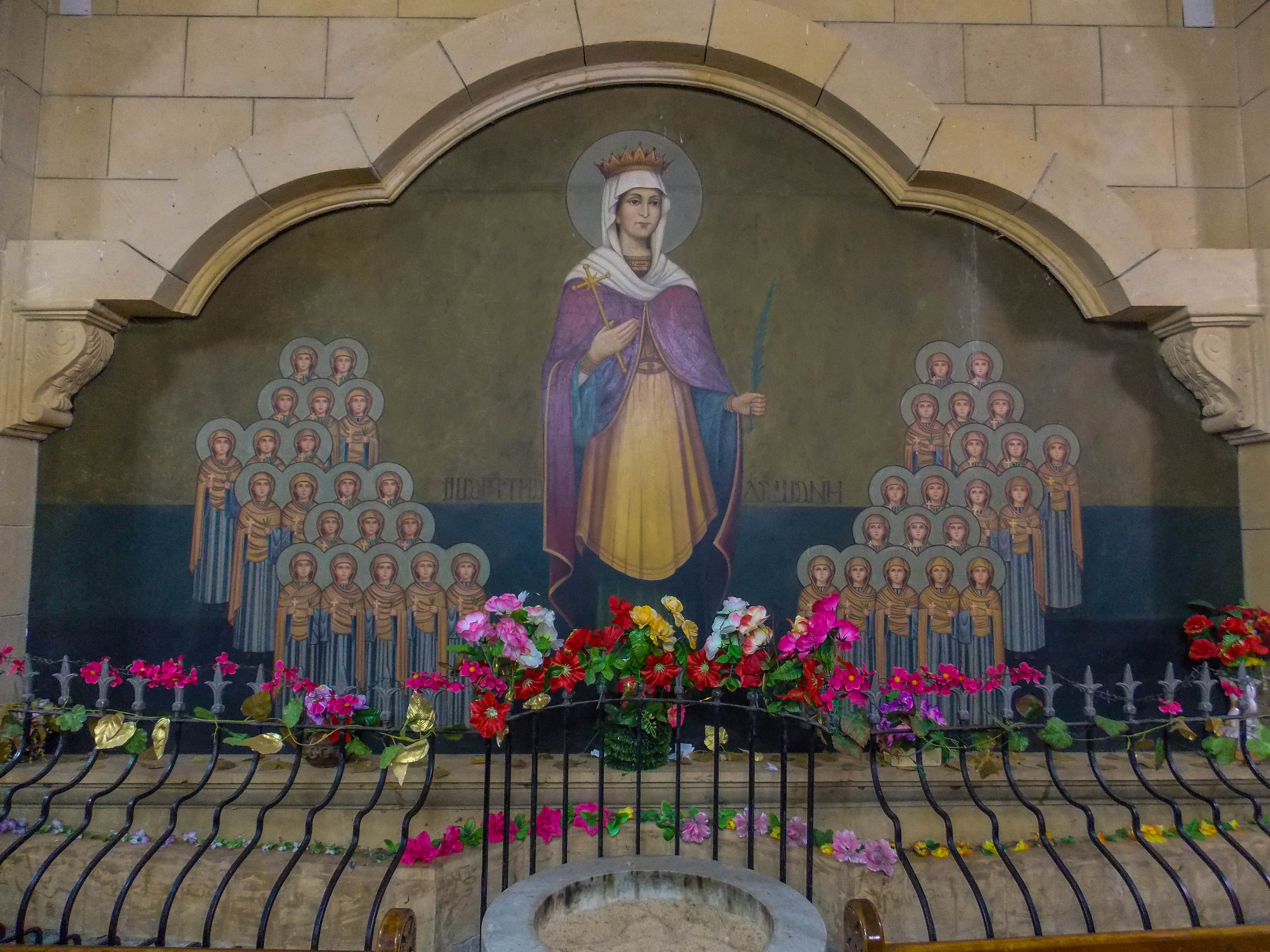
- Coptic icon of Saint Demiana the Holy Martyr

Virgin, martyr
- Born: 3rd century Roman Egypt
- Died: beginning of 4th century Roman Egypt
- Venerated in: Oriental Orthodox Church
- Canonized: Early 4th century
- Major shrine: Saint Demiana's Monastery, Izbat Jimyanah (Abou Taha, Belqas, Dakahlia Governorate), Egypt
- Feast: January 21 (Tooba 13) (Martyrdom of St. Demiana and the 40 Virgins); May 20 (Pashons 12) (Consecration of St. Demiana's Big Church at her monastery)
- Attributes: garments of a Christian virgin, martyr's palm, cross, with 40 other virgins

Demiana (also spelt Dimyanah, Jimyanah and Damiana) and the 40 virgins (Coptic: Ϯⲁⲅⲓⲁ ⲧⲩⲙⲓⲁⲛⲏ ⲛⲉⲙ ⲡⲓϩⲙⲉ ⲉ̅ⲑ̅ⲩ̅ ⲙ︤ⲡⲁⲣⲑⲉⲛⲟⲥ; also known as the Chaste Martyr Saint Demiana) was a Coptic martyr of the early fourth century.

== Life ==
Near the end of the third century, there lived a Christian named Mark. He was the governor of el-Borollos (on the northern shore of the Lake Burullus, at or near today's Burj/Burg Al-Burullus, or somewhere between this town and Baltim), el-Zaafaran (or Za'faran - today Izbat Jimyanah, the village of St Demiana's monastery, or perhaps the nearby town of El Hamool), and the 'Wadi al-Saysaban' (possibly the region around the Sebennytic branch of the Nile in the Delta, that the later Arabic-speaking scribes might have assimilated to 'sesban/saisaban', a plant that grows there). Mark had an only child named Demiana, and her father loved her dearly. When Demiana was still a young child, her mother died, and her father did his utmost to raise her a virtuous Christian.

When she was 15, her father wanted her to marry one of his noble friends, however, she refused. She said she had devoted herself as a bride of Christ and intended to live in celibacy and serve the Lord. Demiana requested her father to build her an isolated house on the outskirts of the city where she could live with her friends, away from the world and its temptations. Her father granted her wish and built her a large palace in the wilderness.

=== Diocletian Persecutions ===
When Emperor Diocletian learned that it was Mark's daughter, Demiana, who had persuaded her father to return to worshiping Jesus, he ordered one of his officers (a 'prince'), to occupy her palace with one hundred soldiers. Diocletian ordered him: "First, try to convince her to worship our idols by offering her riches and glory, but if she refuses then threaten her, torture her, and even behead her and her virgins to make her an example for the other Christians." Demiana saw the soldiers approaching, and prayed to God to strengthen their faith. She told her 40 fellow virgins: "If you are willing to die for Christ's sake then you may stay, but if you cannot withstand the torments of the soldiers then hurry and escape now." The forty virgins replied, "We will die with you and love God with you."

The officer relayed Diocletian's message to Demiana by saying: "I am an envoy sent by Emperor Diocletian. I command you by his orders to worship his gods so that he may grant you whatsoever you wish." Demiana shouted: "Cursed be the messenger and he who sent him ... There is no other God in heaven or on earth besides the one and only true God – the Father, the Son and the Holy Spirit – the creator, who has no beginning and no end; the omnipresent and omniscient God who will throw you in hell for eternal condemnation. As for me, I worship my Lord and Savior Jesus Christ, and his good father and the Holy Spirit – the Holy Trinity – I profess him ... and in his name I will die and by him I will live forever."

The officer was enraged with Demiana and ordered her to be placed in the 'hinbazeen' (squeezing press) until her blood poured on the ground. When they put her in prison, an angel appeared to her, touched her body with his celestial wings, and she was healed of all her wounds. She was subjected to additional tortures, but through it all her faith sustained her. The officer issued an order that Demiana and the 40 virgins be beheaded. St. Demiana received three heavenly crowns: for her virginity, her endurance of torture and her martyrdom.

== The tomb of Demiana and the 40 virgins ==
During the reign of Constantine the Great, his mother Helena visited the site of Demiana's monastery palace, where she had a church built over the tomb. This tomb church was consecrated by Pope Alexander I of Alexandria (the 19th Coptic Orthodox Patriarch of the See of St. Mark), on May 20, Bashans 12 (Coptic calendar).

The original church was eventually destroyed but it has been rebuilt several times and it still stands on the very same site to this day. Every year, many people visit Saint Demiana's shrine, asking for her intercessions. The main season of visit is the period between 4th to 12th Bashans. (12–20 May).

== Restoration of Demiana's monastery ==
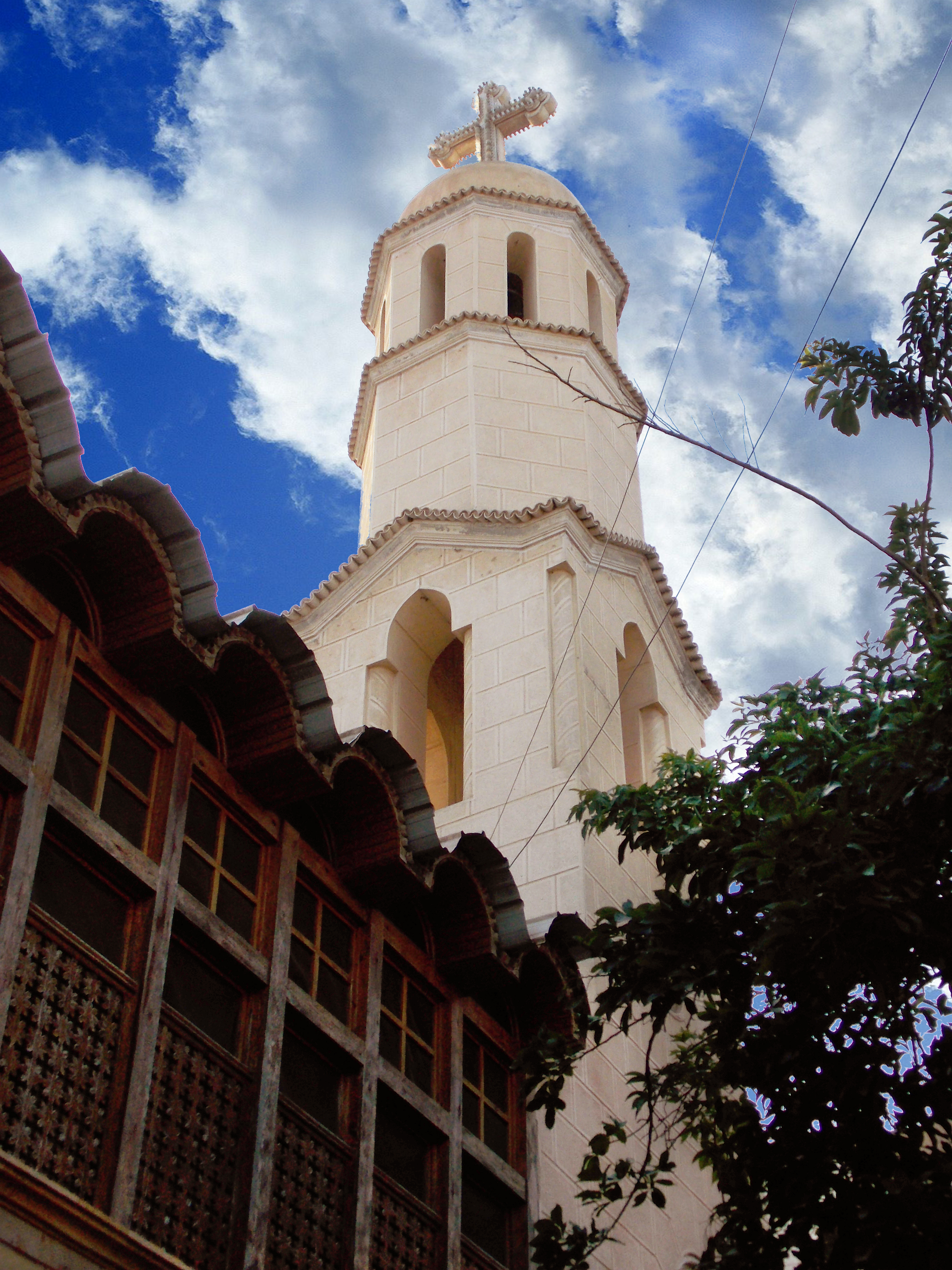
Monastery of Saint Demiana, Egypt.

Situated in Izbat Jimyanah (Abou Taha, Belqas, Dakahlia Governorate), Egypt, at the same place where Demiana's original monastery complex and Tomb Church stood, is a coenobitic Coptic Orthodox Monastery for nuns bearing her name — St. Demiana's Monastery. The first restoration of the monastery was done under the Umayyad governor Hassan ibn Atahiyah, around 745 A.D. The modern monastery was officially consecrated as a coenobitic Coptic Orthodox Convent on September 24, 1978, by Shenouda III, Pope of Alexandria and 117th Coptic Orthodox Patriarch of the See of St. Mark.

At the monastery, four of the nine churches are dedicated to the saint: Saint Demiana's big church, Saint Demiana's tomb church, Saint Demiana's ancient church and Saint Demiana's church for nuns. Many churches of the Coptic Orthodox Church are also dedicated to her patronage.

In May 2014 Egyptian security forces averted a car bomb attack on the monastery.

== Founder of monasticism for Coptic Orthodox nuns ==
Demiana is the founder of monasticism for Coptic Orthodox nuns and the princess (highest ranking) of female martyrs of the Coptic Orthodox Church. Demiana and her 40 virgin nuns are depicted in Coptic icons as not wearing the black monastic habit as we see Coptic Orthodox nuns wear nowadays because at her time, the black monastic habit had not yet taken form.

According to the statement of Greek Orthodox Metropolitan Panteleimon (Lampadarios) of Pelusium, Demiana has been added as a Greek Orthodox saint, and her vita is now in the Synaxarium of the Greek Orthodox Church.

== Feasts of St. Demiana and the 40 virgins ==
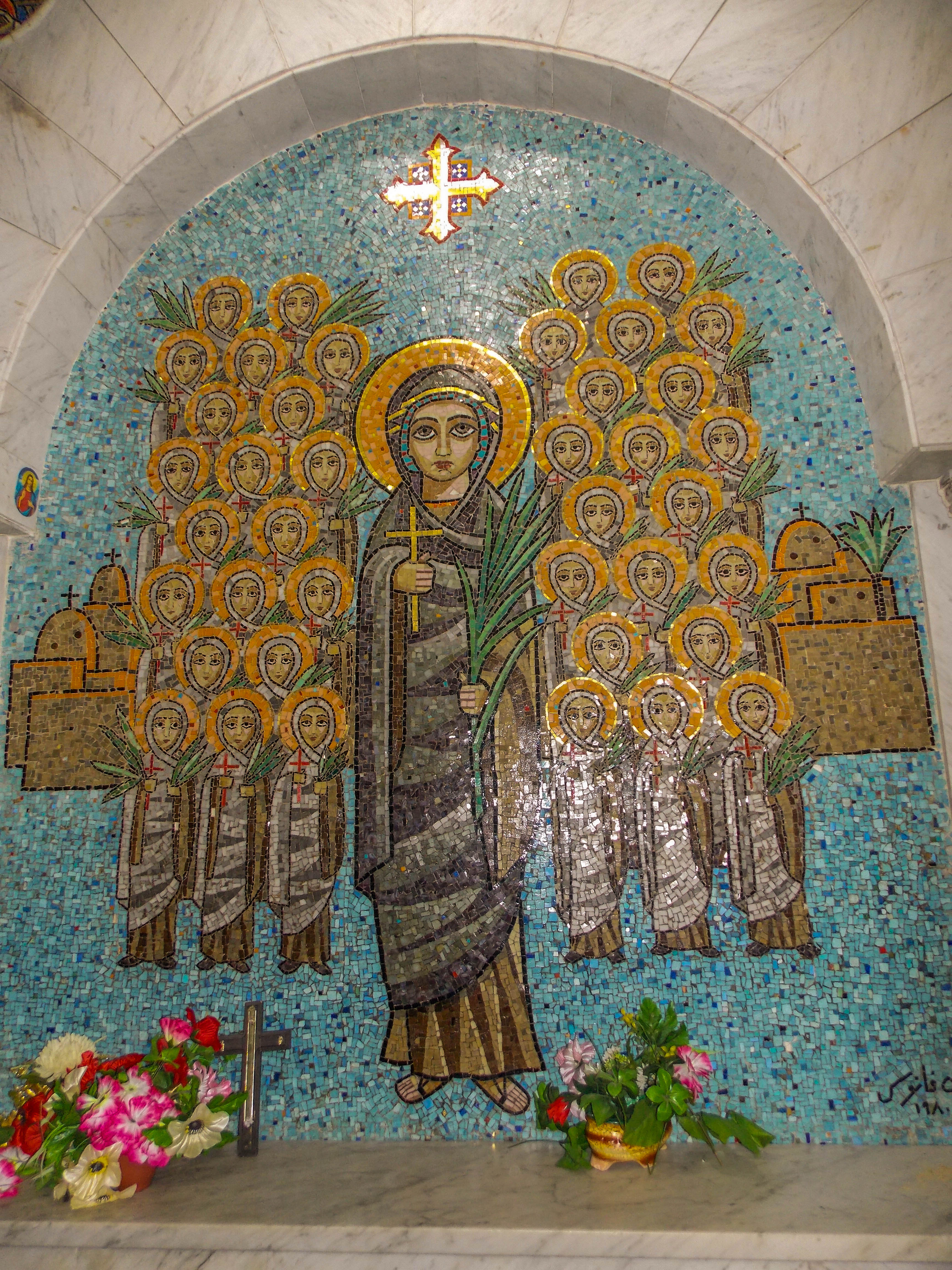
Saint Demiana

The Coptic Orthodox Church commemorates the feasts of Saint Demiana and the 40 virgins' martyrdom on January 21, Toba 13 (Coptic calendar), and the consecration of Saint Demiana's big church at her monastery on May 20, Bashans 12 (Coptic calendar).

== Primary sources ==
The life of Demiana and the 40 virgins is found in two Arabic sources: the Synaxarium and the Life Story of the Chaste Saint Demiana and History of the Monastery. The life story was translated from Arabic into English by the nuns of Saint Demiana's Monastery in Egypt. The book Life Story of the Chaste Saint Demiana and History of the Monastery, is taken from 18th century manuscripts, originally written by Bishop John (Bishop of El-Borollos); these manuscripts were transcribed from older manuscripts dated in the 6th century during the apostolic service of Damian of Alexandria (563-598 A.D., 35th Patriarch of the See of St. Mark), and were originally transcribed from ancient manuscripts written by Christodoulos, the disciple of Julius of Aqfahs (4th century).

Demiana is the founder of monasticism for Coptic Orthodox nuns and the highest ranking female martyr of the Coptic Orthodox Church due to her forbearance of great persecution, torture and suffering.
