= Wahid al taweela =

Egyptian writer

- Born: 6 April 1960 in Kafr Al sheikh
- Occupation: Writer. Languages: Arabic.

== Waheed Al taweela ==
He was born on June 4, 1960, in Kafr El-Sheikh. Wahid is an Egyptian writer. He worked as an expert for cultural relations at the Cultural Village Foundation in Qatar “Katara” between 2006 and 2009. He also worked as a media expert at the League of Arab States for two periods between 1993 and 2006 and between 2009 and 2012. He is currently the director of the Doha Magazine office in Cairo, the president of the Arab Cafe Organization, and a member of the International Cafe Federation.

== His publishing ==
1- "A Little Behind the End" (collection of short stories), 2002.

2- "As Befits a Short Man" (collection of short stories), 2003.

3- "Fancy Games" (novel), 2004.

4- "Light Red" (novel), 2008.

5- "The Night's Gate" (novel), 2013.

6- Fellini's Shoes (novel), 2016.

7- "One Hundred Winks in the Left Eye" (Story Collection), 2016.

80 "A New Funeral for Emad Hamdi" (novel), 2019.

== His prizes ==
Sawiris Prize for Fiction, Senior Writers Category 2015 for the novel “The Night’s Gate".
