= Mit Elwan =

Village in the Kafr El Sheikh Governorate in Egypt

Mit Elwan is a village in the Kafr El Sheikh Governorate in Egypt.

== See also ==
- List of cities and towns in Egypt
