= El Hamool =

El Hamool الحامول
- Town
- Location in Egypt
- Coordinates: 31.31°N 31.142222°E
- Country: Egypt
- Governorate: Kafr El Sheikh

Area
  - Total: 58.1 km^{2} (22.4 sq mi)
- Elevation: 1 m (3.3 ft)

Population (2023)
  - Total: 59,520
  - Density: 1,020/km^{2} (2,650/sq mi)
- Time zone: UTC+2 (EET)
  - Summer (DST): UTC+3 (EEST)

El Hamool or (Arabic: الحامول) is one of the largest towns in the Kafr El Sheikh Governorate, in the north of Egypt. It is located in the northern part of the Governorate.

== Name ==
The name, El Hamool, comes from the name of a plant known locally as "el hamool" which is usually planted in Lake Burullus near Baltim.

== See also ==
- List of cities and towns in Egypt
