= Kafr El Sheikh University =

University in Egypt

- جامعة كفر الشيخ
- Former names: Higher Agricultural Institute (1957-1967); Alexandria University, Kafr El Sheikh Branch (1969 - 1973); Tanta University, Kafr El-Sheikh Branch (1973 - 2006)
- Number of faculties: 17 colleges
- Type: Public university
- Established: 2006; 20 years ago
- President: Prof. Abdel Razek Dessouky
- Location: Sakha Road, Kafr Elsheikh, Egypt; 31°5′54″N 30°57′0″E
- Website: www.kfs.edu.eg

University rankings

Global – Overall
- THE World: 801–1000 (2024)
- USNWR Global: =639 (2023)

Kafr El Sheikh University is an Egyptian university established in 2006, located at Kafr El Sheikh, in the middle of the Nile Delta. The University has a number of faculties (or colleges) such as: Engineering, Medicine, Physiotherapy and Nursing, Pharmacy, Veterinary Medicine, Science, Education, Agriculture, Arts, Specific Education, Commerce, Physical Education.

== History ==
The foundation stone of Kafr El-Sheikh University was laid in 1957 with the establishment of the Higher Agricultural Institute in Kafr El-Sheikh. Initially affiliated with the Ministry of Higher Education, the institute became the Faculty of Agriculture in 1969, initially under the jurisdiction of Alexandria University. Following the establishment of Tanta University in 1973, its affiliation was transferred to the university. The Faculty of Education was established in 1977, and a branch of Tanta University was founded in Kafr El-Sheikh in 1983.

The establishment of other faculties affiliated with Tanta University continued after the Kafr El-Sheikh branch. The Faculty of Veterinary Medicine was established in 1985, followed by the Faculties of Commerce and Engineering in 1990, and the Faculty of Specific Education in 1988 (which was under the Ministry of Higher Education until its affiliation was transferred to Tanta University by Ministerial Decree No. (1187) of 1991). The Faculty of Arts was established in 1993, and the Faculty of Physical Education in 1997. Finally, Presidential Decree No. (129) of 2006 transferred the Tanta University branch located in Kafr El-Sheikh to the university. In Kafr El-Sheikh, the university was established, and the colleges were transferred to it. The opening of colleges at Kafr El-Sheikh University continued until it included nineteen colleges and three institutes in the present day.

== Faculties ==
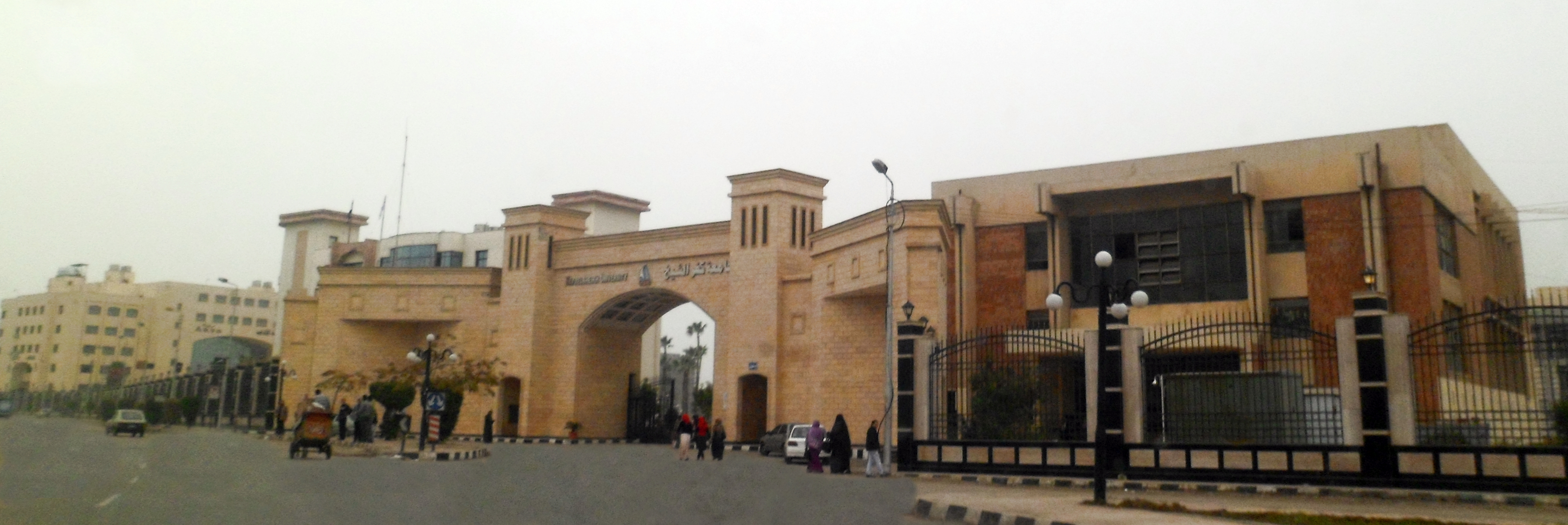
The university's main gate is located on the Sakha-Kafr El-Sheikh road.

The university comprises nineteen faculties and three institutes, listed below (by establishment date):

- Faculty of Agriculture (1969)
- Faculty of Education (1977)
- Faculty of Veterinary Medicine (1985)
- Faculty of Commerce (1990)
- Faculty of Engineering (1990)
- Faculty of Specific Education (1991)
- Faculty of Arts (1994)
- Faculty of Physical Education (1997)
- Faculty of Science (2009)
- Faculty of Pharmacy and Pharmaceutical Manufacturing (2013)
- Faculty of Medicine (2013)
- Faculty of Physical Therapy (2013)
- Faculty of Nursing (2013)
- Faculty of Fisheries and Aquaculture (2013)
- Faculty of Oral and Dental Medicine (2014)
- Faculty of Computers and Information (2015)
- Faculty of Languages (2016)
- Institute of Nanoscience and Technology (2017)
- Institute of Drug Discovery and Development (2017)
- Technical Institute of Nursing (2018)
- Faculty of Law (2018)
- Faculty of Artificial Intelligence (2019)

== See also ==
- Education in Egypt
- List of universities in Egypt
