= Khaled Azab =

Egyptian writer and scholar

- Born: 1966 (age 59–60); Cairo, Egypt
- Education: Cairo University
- Awards: He received the most important Arab book award from the Arab Thought Foundation, 2017; He was awarded the State Prize for Excellence in the Social Sciences Branch by the Supreme Council of Culture in Egypt for all his research work in 2016.

Khaled Azab (Arabic:خالد عزب; born 1966) is an Egyptian writer and professor. He holds a PhD in Islamic archaeology. He worked as the Head of the Projects and Central Services Sector in Bibliotheca Alexandrina. He won two awards, including the State Award for Excellence in Social Sciences Branch by the Supreme Council for Culture in Egypt for all his research work in 2016. He was arrested by the competent authorities in Egypt on charges of spreading false news and misusing social media in 2019, but he was released in August 2020.

== Education and career ==
Khaled Muhammad Mustafa Azab was born in Kafr El Sheikh Governorate in Egypt on 18 May 1966. He graduated from Cairo University and obtained a bachelor's degree in Archeology in 1988. Then he obtained a master's degree in "Islamic Jurisprudence in Civil Architecture in the cities of Cairo and Rashid in the Mamluk and Ottoman eras" in 1995. He obtained his doctorate in 2002 with his thesis entitled "Political Transformations and their impact on architecture of Cairo from the Ayyubid era until the era of Khedive Ismail". Azab worked as the Head of the sector of projects and Central Services in Bibliotheca Alexcandrina. He was also the head of antiquities inspectors from 1994 to 2001. He held the position of deputy director in one of the research centers of the Library of Alexandria called "Calligraphy Center" from 2003 until 2009. He was also a member in many scientific institutions and societies including a member of the Egyptian Society for Historical Studies, a member of the Association Antiquities and Islamic Arts, a member of the Egyptian Society for Historical Studies, a member of the Egyptian Artier Union, and a member of the Society for the Revival of the Scientific Heritage of Islamic Civilization. In addition, Azab also worked as an editor for a number of Arab magazines and newspaper, including the Qatari newspaper "Al Sharq" in Cairo, the London-based newspaper "Al-Hayat", and also worked at "Miskhat" magazine as a managing editor.

Azab has published 15 books and several studies and analytical research related to history and archaeology. In 2014, he won the most important Arab book award from the Arab Thought Foundation for his book "The Jurisprudence of Urbanism: Architecture, Society and the State in Islamic Civilization". Azab was also awarded the State Prize for Excellence in the Social Sciences branch by the Supreme Council of Culture in Egypt for all his research work in 2016.

== His arrest ==
He was arrested by the competent authorities in Egypt at his home in Cairo in April 2019. At first, the reasons for his arrest and the charges against him were unclear. However, after two weeks of his detention, it became clear that his charge was spreading false news and misusing social media. He was arrested after he posted a blog on his Facebook page in which he mentioned that a rare manuscript from the Mamluk era had been smuggled and offered for sale in an auction abroad. After a one-year and three-month imprisonment, the counseling room of the Cairo Criminal Court decided to release him at August 2020.

== Works ==
- "Masterpieces of Arabic calligraphy at Al-Busiri Mosque" (original title: Rawaa al-Khat al-Arabi), 2005
- “The Stone and the Scepter: Politics and Islamic Architecture” (original title: Al-Hajar wa Al-Soljan: Al Siasa wa al-Emara Al-Islamia), 2007
- “Fustat, Birth, Prosperity, and Regression” (al Fustat, Al nashaa, al Izdihar, wa al ihesar), 2008
- “Islamic Architecture from China to Andalusia” (original title: Al Imara Al Islamia min al Seen ila Al Andalus), 2010
- “With Ibn Khaldoun .. in His Journey” (original title: Maa Ibn Khaldoun .. fi rihlatih), 2010

== Awards and honors ==
- He received the most important Arab book award from the Arab Thought Foundation, 2014
- He was awarded the State Prize for Excellence in the Social Sciences Branch by the Supreme Council of Culture in Egypt for all his research work in 2016.
