= Mahmoud El Manhaly =

Egyptian plant scientist

- Born: 1 January 1942 (age 84); Metoubes
- Citizenship: Egypt
- Education: Alexandria University
- Occupation: academic

Dr. Mahmoud El Manhaly (born 1 January 1942) is an Egyptian sugaring plants scientist. El Manhaly was the manager of the Egyptian Research Institute of sugaring plants, and the technical consultant of Dr. Youssef Waly; the Egyptian former minister of Agriculture. He is also a staff member of the Higher Institute of Tourism in Alexandria.

El Manhaly was the first to produce the seeds of sugar beet in Egypt and in Syria.

== Early life ==
El Manhaly was born on 1 January 1942 in Metoubes, a town in Kafr El Sheikh.

== Career ==
El Manhaly was graduated from faculty of agriculture of Alexandria University in 1964.
