= Belqas =

Belqas بلقاس
- Town
- Location in Egypt
- Coordinates: 31°14′N 31°22′E
- Country: Egypt
- Governorate: Dakahlia

Area
  - Total: 725.7 km^{2} (280.2 sq mi)
- Elevation: 1 m (3.3 ft)

Population (2023)
  - Total: 571,698
  - Density: 787.8/km^{2} (2,040/sq mi)
- Time zone: UTC+2 (EET)
  - Summer (DST): UTC+3 (EEST)
- Postal Code: 35631

Belqas (Egyptian Arabic: بلقاس, pronounced [belˈʔæːs]) is a town located in the north-western corner of the Dakahlia Governorate in Egypt.

== Etymology ==
The towns older name is al-Mima wa-l-Maaskar (Arabic: الميما والمعسكر, lit. 'the Mima and the military camp') points out that the modern name probably comes from Bilqis, Bilkis, Balqis, Makeda, Queen of Sheba Ancient Greek: φυλακῆς, romanized: phylakes, lit. 'of garrison, military camp'. It is also a site of the old Coptic monastery called Deir al-Mema or Deir al-Askar.

== Economy ==
One part of the town's economy is the resort of Gamasa. The town also depends on its natural gas fields in the region of Abu Mady. Belqas remains a mainly agricultural region, although it contains some industrial activities such as sugar, rice and plastic productions.

Belqas also depends on its car maintenance and restoration facility, restoring vehicles to factory standards (especially for the Peugeot and Mercedes Benz).

== Location ==
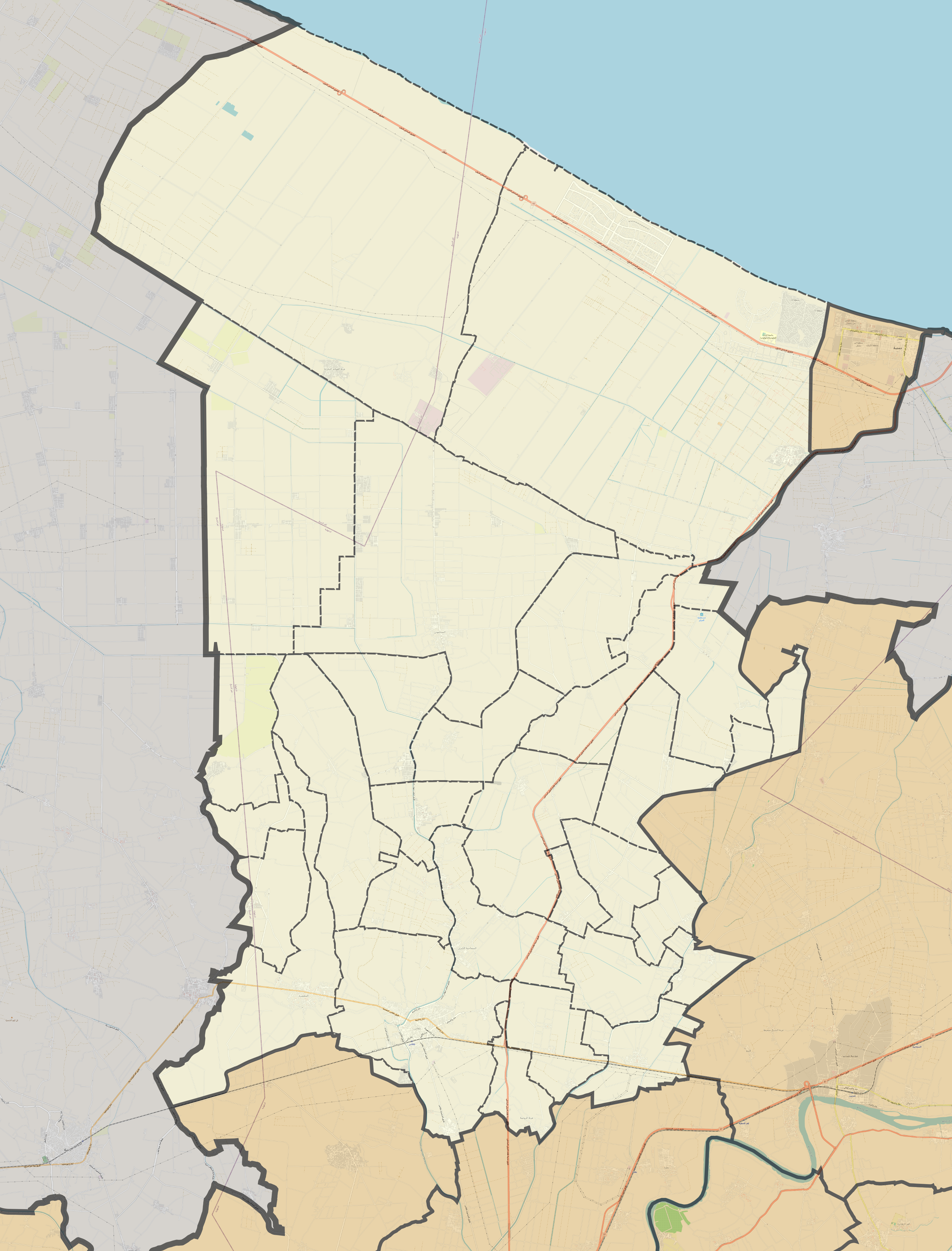
The Markaz of Belqas and its subdivisions

Belqas is located near the city of Mansoura and the town of Gamasa. Belqas is in the governorates of Dakahlia and Kafr el-Sheikh, and is located in the center of Sherbin, Garaida, Talkha and Gamasa. Belqas is located on the coordinates 31°14′00″N 31°22′00″E.

== Sites of interest ==
Belqas is home to ancient palaces and villas which were once owned by princes and merchants. One of these tourist attractions in the jurisdictions of Belqas is the Coptic Orthodox monastery of Saint Demiana.

== See also ==
- List of cities and towns in Egypt
