= El Reyad =

El Reyad الرياض
- City
- Nickname: الوحال
- Location in Egypt
- Coordinates: 31.236546°N 30.945347°E
- Country: Egypt
- Governorate: Kafr El Sheikh

Area
  - Total: 437.6 km^{2} (169.0 sq mi)

Population (2023)
  - Total: 205,445
  - Density: 469.5/km^{2} (1,216/sq mi)
- Time zone: UTC+2 (EET)
  - Summer (DST): UTC+3 (EEST)

El Reyad (Arabic: الرياض) is a city in the Kafr El Sheikh Governorate, Egypt. The 2023 census by the Central Agency for Public Mobilization and Statistics recorded 205,445 people living in the city: 105,214 males and 100,231 females.
