= Metoubes =

Metoubes مطوبس
- Town
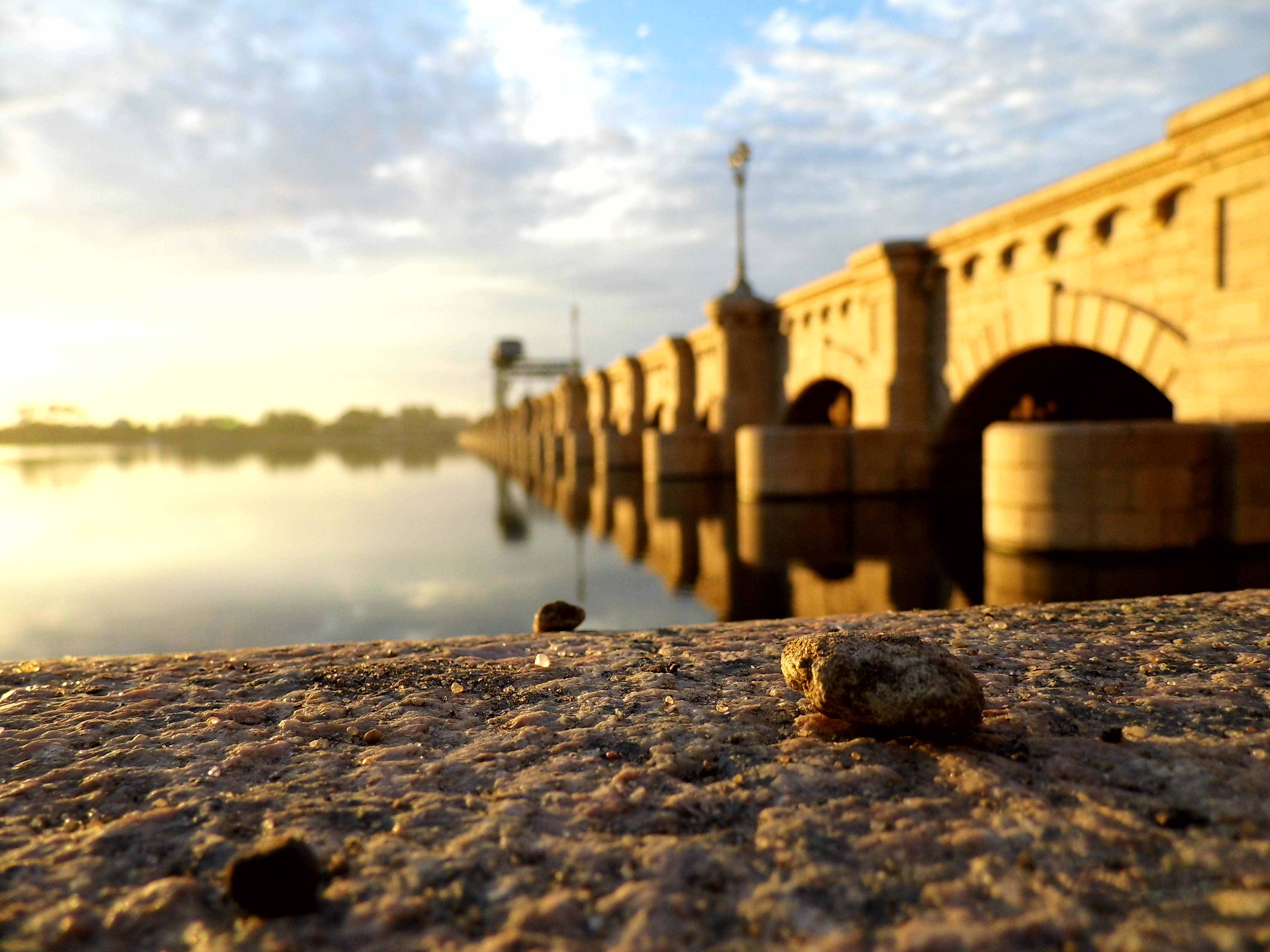
- Qanater Edfina Park, Metoubes, Egypt

- Location in Egypt
- Coordinates: 31°17′30″N 30°31′20″E
- Country: Egypt
- Governorate: Kafr El Sheikh

Area
  - Total: 131.4 sq mi (340.4 km^{2})

Population
  - Total: 324,515
  - Density: 2,469/sq mi (953.3/km^{2})
- Time zone: UTC+2 (EET)
  - Summer (DST): UTC+3 (EEST)

Metoubes (Arabic: مطوبس) is a town in the northern part of the Kafr El Sheikh Governorate of Egypt.

The older names of the town are Netoubes (Arabic: نطوبس) and Netoubes Al-Rumman (Arabic: نطوبس الرمان).

== See also ==
- List of cities and towns in Egypt
