= Nile Delta =

African river delta bordering the Mediterranean

Coordinates: 30°54′N 31°7′E

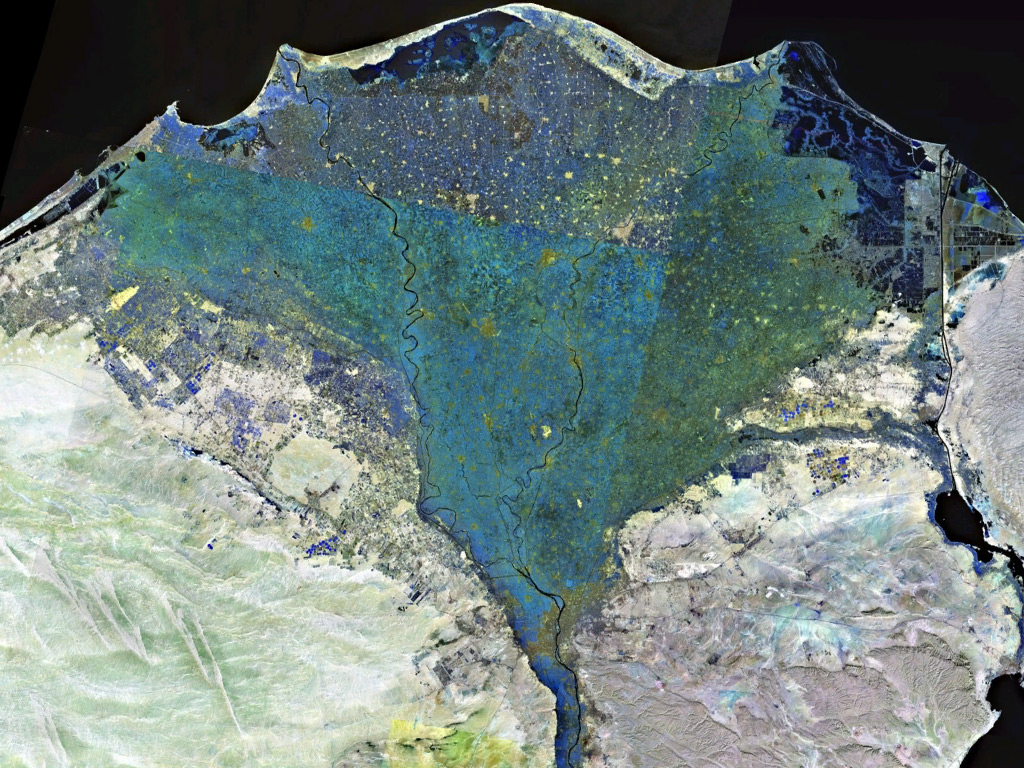
NASA satellite photograph of the Nile Delta (shown in false color)

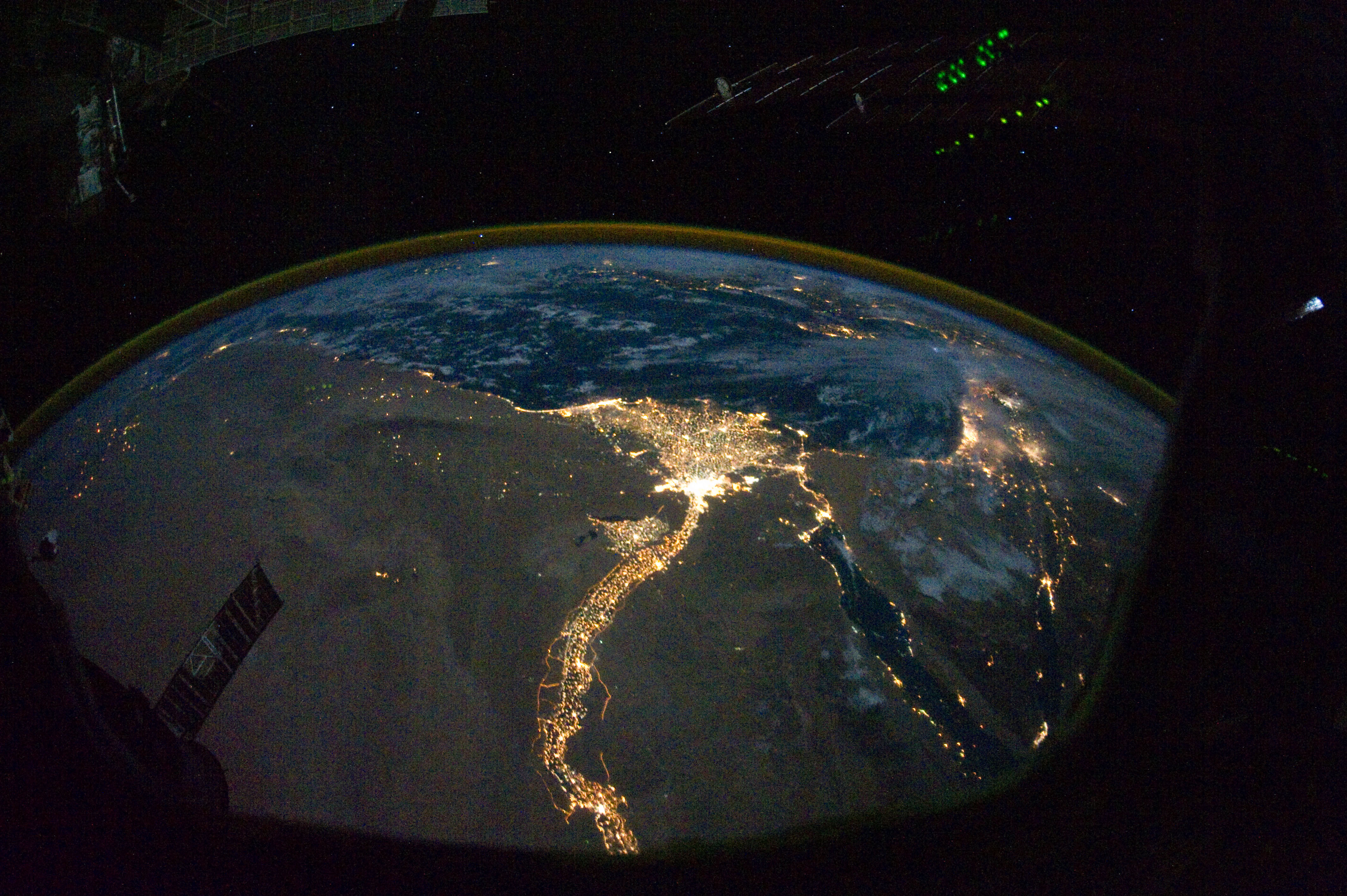
The Nile Delta at night as seen from the ISS in October 2010.

The Nile Delta (Arabic: دلتا النيل, Delta an-Nīl or simply الدلتا, ad-Delta) is the delta formed in Lower Egypt where the Nile River spreads out and drains into the Mediterranean Sea. It is one of the world's largest deltas. From Alexandria in the west to Port Said in the east; it covers 240 km (150 mi) of the Mediterranean coastline and is a rich agricultural region. From north to south the delta is about 160 km (100 mi) long. The Delta begins from Cairo.. The Nile Delta is exposed to environmental changes challenges such as the rise of sea level, land sinking, and coastal erosion, all of which threaten its agricultural lands and ecosystems.

== Geography ==

From north to south, the delta is about 160 km (100 mi) long. From west to east, it covers some 240 km (150 mi) of coastline. The delta is sometimes divided into sections, with the Nile dividing into two main distributaries, the Damietta and the Rosetta, flowing into the Mediterranean at port cities with the same names. In the past, the delta had several distributaries, but these have been lost due to flood control, silting, and changing relief. One such defunct distributary is Wadi Tumilat.

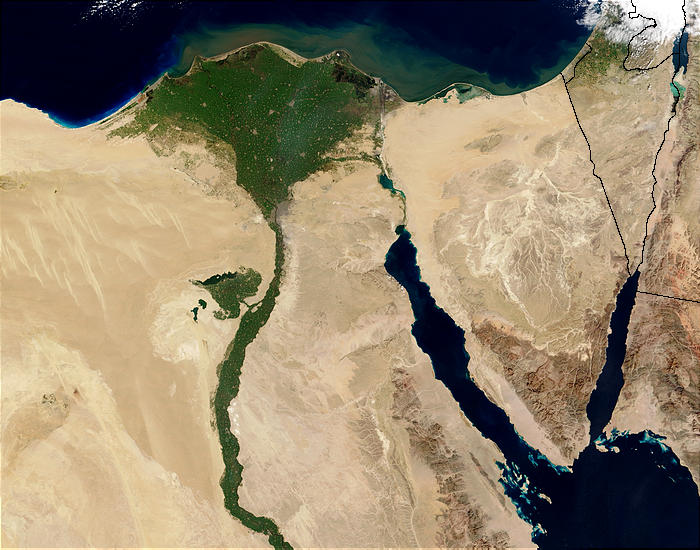
Nile River and Delta

The Suez Canal is east of the delta and enters the coastal Lake Manzala in the north-east of the delta. To the north-west are three other coastal lakes or lagoons: Lake Burullus, Lake Idku and Lake Mariout.

The Nile is considered to be an "arcuate" delta (arc-shaped), as it resembles a triangle or flower when seen from above. Aristotle speculated that the delta was constructed for agricultural purposes due to the drying of the region of Egypt.

In the modern day, the outer edges of the delta are eroding, and some coastal lagoons have seen increasing salinity levels as their connection to the Mediterranean Sea increases. Because the delta no longer receives nutrients and sediments from upstream, thanks to the 1970 completion of the Aswan Dam, the soils of the floodplains have become poorer, and large amounts of fertilizers are now used. Topsoil in the delta can be as much as 21 m (70 ft) in depth.

The Nile Delta is also an important region for fish farming. Along its northeastern coast, several coastal lagoons have been modified into aquaculture ponds, helping support fish production following changes to the Nile's natural flooding and sediment supply caused by the Aswan High Dam.

== History ==
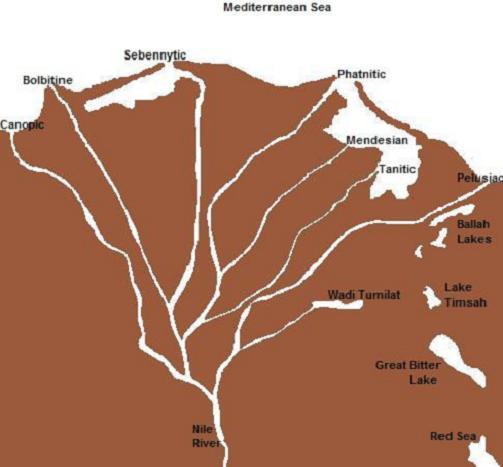
Ancient branches of the Nile, showing Wadi Tumilat, and the lakes east of the Delta

People have lived in the Nile Delta region for thousands of years, and it has been intensively farmed for at least the past five thousand years. The delta was a major part of Lower Egypt, and many archaeological sites are located in and around the region. Artifacts belonging to ancient sites have been found on the delta's coast. The Rosetta Stone was found in the delta in 1799 in the port city of Rosetta (an anglicized version of the name Rashid). In July 2019 a small Greek temple, ancient granite columns, treasure-carrying ships, and bronze coins from the reign of Ptolemy II, dating back to the third and fourth centuries BC, were found at the sunken city of Heracleion, colloquially known as Egypt's Atlantis. The investigations were conducted by Egyptian and European divers led by the underwater archaeologist Franck Goddio. They also uncovered a devastated historic temple (the city's main temple) underwater off Egypt's north coast.

In January 2019, archaeologists led by Mostafa Waziri working in the Kom Al-Khelgan area of the Nile Delta discovered tombs from the Second Intermediate Period and burials from the Naqada II era. The burial site contained the remains of animals, amulets and scarabs carved from faience, round and oval pots with handles, flint knives, broken and burned pottery. All burials included skulls and skeletons in the bending position and were not very well-preserved.

=== Ancient branches of the Nile ===
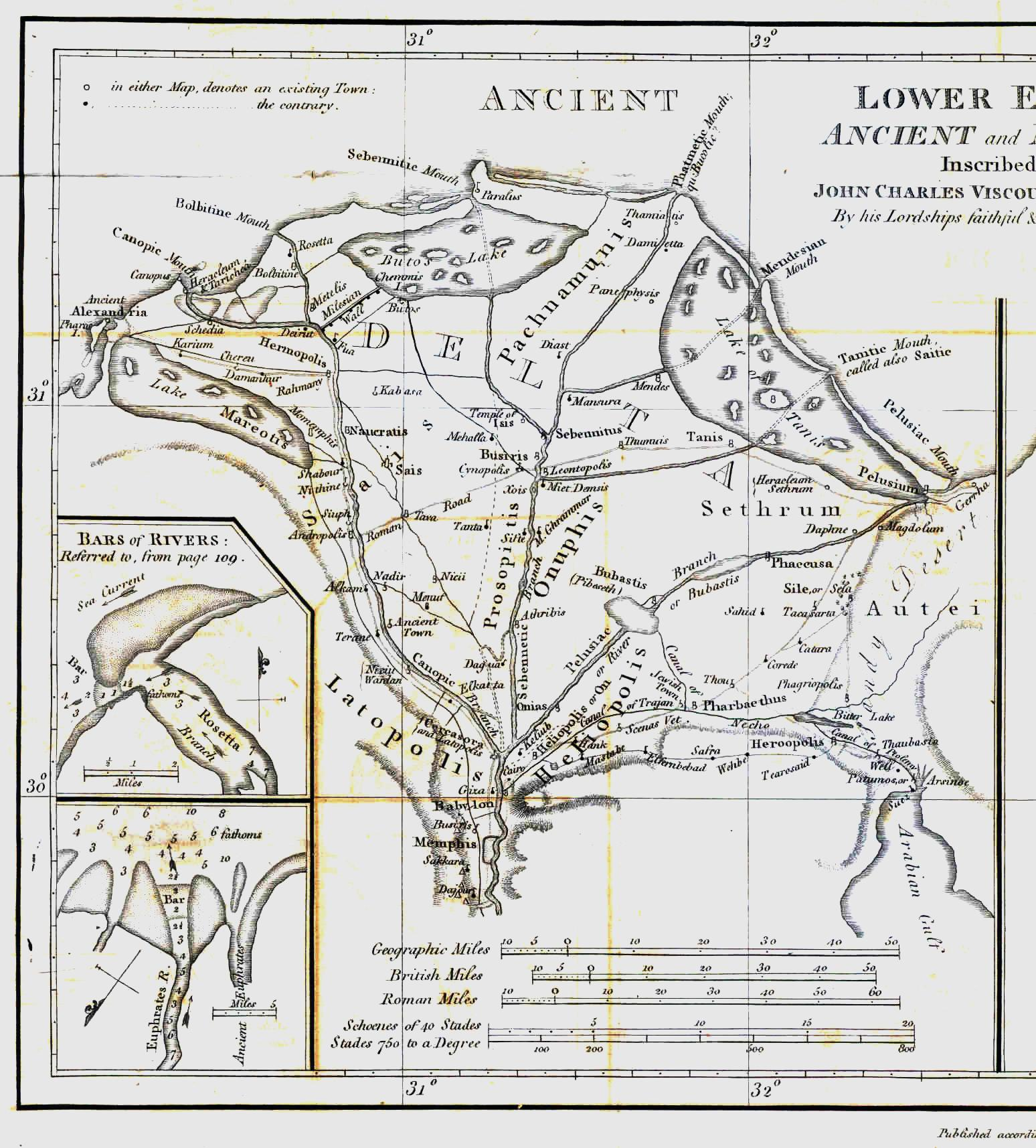
The Nile Delta at the time of Herodotus, according to James Rennell (1800)

Records from ancient times (such as by Ptolemy) reported that the delta had seven distributaries or branches, (from east to west):

- the Pelusiac
- the Tanitic
- the Mendesian
- the Phatnitic or Phatmetic (later the Damietta)
- the Sebennytic
- the Bolbitine (later the Rosetta)
- the Canopic (also called the Herakleotic, Agathodaemon (Note: e.g. in Ptolemy, Geography.))

==== George of Cyprus list ====
- Alexandrian (Schedia canal)
- Colynthin (Canopic)
- Agnu (Rosetta)
- Parollos (Burullus)
- Chasmatos (Baltim)
- Tamiathe (Damietta)
- Tenese (Tinnis)

Modern Egyptologists suggest that in the Pharaonic era there were at a time five main branches:

- the Pelusiac
- the Sebennytic
- the Canopic
- the Damietta
- the Rosetta

The first three have dried up over the centuries due to flood control, silting and changing relief, while the last two still exist today. The Delta used to flood annually, but this ended with the construction of the Aswan Dam.

==== Butic Canal ====
Butic Canal, or Butic River, was an ancient east-west watercourse in the Nile Delta. It had a reconstructed length of about 185–200 km, which would make it the longest canal in Egypt. It did not pass by the town of Buto, itself, but went south of it and the large Butic lake that almost reached the Mediterranean Sea.

The earliest reference to this canal is in Flavius Josephus’ History of the Jewish War. It is only an indirect reference; Josephus is describing the events around 70 CE, during the reign of Vespasian and his son Titus. At that time, the Roman authorities moved troops from Alexandria to Judea, partly by ship, in order to fight against the Jewish rebellion.

Also, the 2nd century CE geographer Ptolemy described this canal as spanning the entire width of the delta from east to west. He calls this canal Boutikos potamos. It probably reached from Pelusium in the east, to Hermopolis Parva (Damanhur) in the west.

According to Schiestl (2021), in the eastern delta, the canal is much better attested, and some portions of it have been located. But in the western delta, its traces are more difficult to find. He suggests that the eastern portion of the canal was much older, but the western portion was only completed in the Roman times.

== Population ==
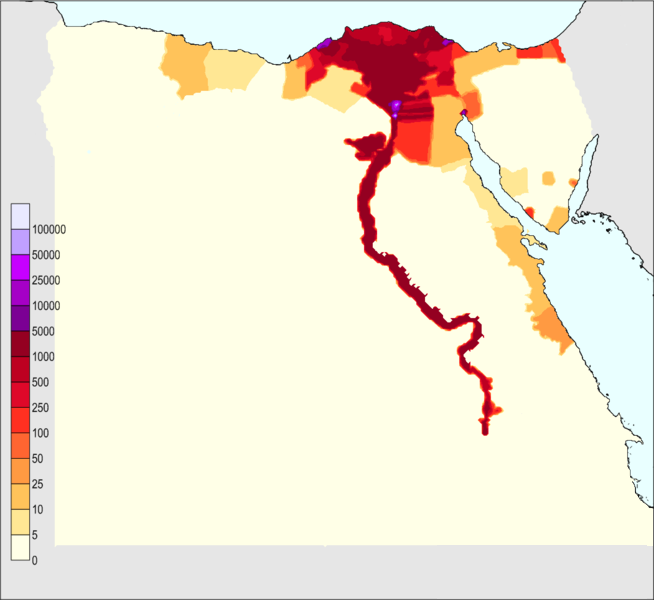
Population density

About 70 million people live in the Delta region. Outside of major cities, population density in the delta averages 1,000/km^{2} (2,600/sq mi) or more. Cairo is the largest city in the delta. Other large cities in the delta include Shubra El Kheima, Port Said, El Mahalla El Kubra, Mansura, Tanta, and Zagazig.

== Wildlife ==
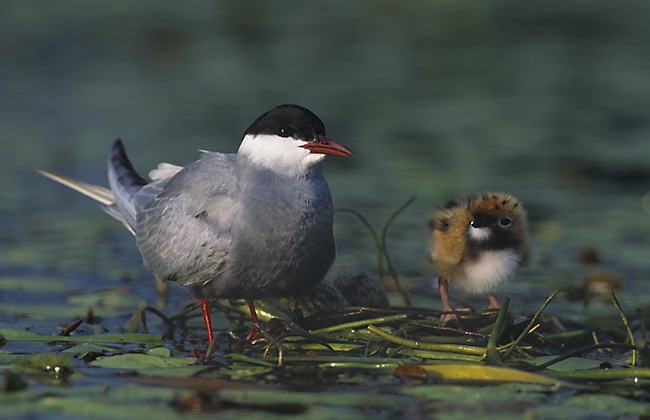
Whiskered tern

During autumn, parts of the Nile River are red with lotus flowers. The Lower Nile (North) and the Upper Nile (South) have plants that grow in abundance. The Upper Nile plant is the Egyptian lotus, and the Lower Nile plant is the Papyrus Sedge (Cyperus papyrus), although it is not nearly as plentiful as it once was, and is becoming quite rare.

Several hundred thousand water birds spend their winter in the delta, including the world's largest concentrations of little gulls and whiskered terns. Other birds making their homes in the delta include grey herons, Kentish plovers, shovelers, cormorants, egrets and ibises.

Other animals found in the delta include frogs, turtles, tortoises, mongooses, and the Nile monitor. Nile crocodiles and hippopotamus, two animals which were widespread in the delta during antiquity, are no longer found there. Fish found in the delta include the flathead grey mullet and soles.

== Climate ==
The Delta has a hot desert climate (Köppen: BWh) as the rest of Egypt, but its northernmost part, as is the case with the rest of the northern coast of Egypt which is the wettest region in the country, has relatively moderate temperatures, with highs usually not surpassing 31 °C (88 °F) in the summer. Only 100–200 mm (4–8 in) of rain falls on the delta area during an average year, and most of this falls in the winter months. The delta experiences its hottest temperatures in July and August, with a maximum average of 34 °C (93 °F). Winter temperatures normally range from 9 °C (48 °F) at nights to 19 °C (66 °F) in the daytime. With cooler temperatures and some rain, the Nile Delta region becomes quite humid during the winter months.

== Sea level rise ==
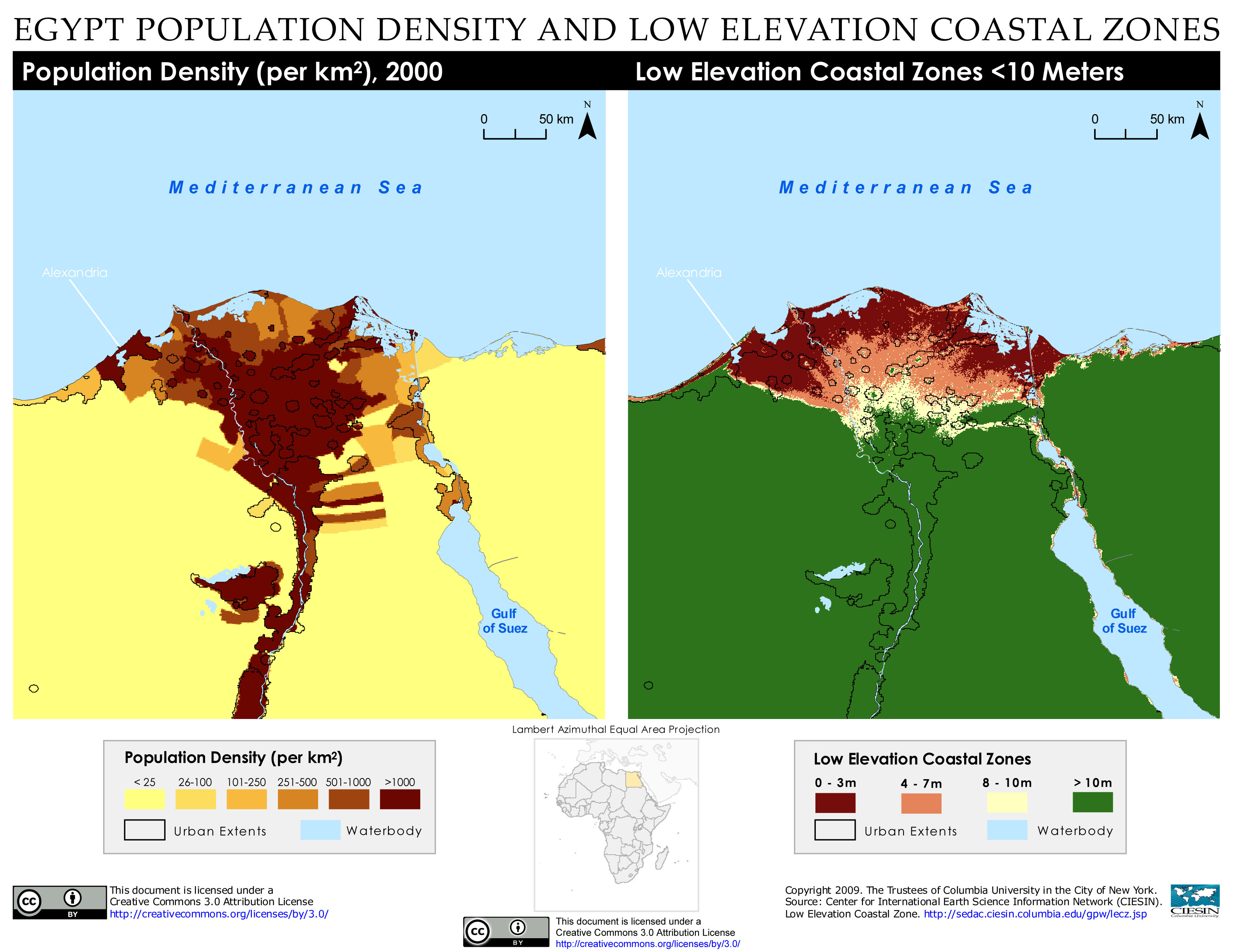
Population density and low elevation coastal zones. The Nile Delta is especially vulnerable to sea level rise.

Egypt's Mediterranean coastline loses land to the sea, in some places to 90 m (100 yd) a year. The low-lying Nile Delta area in particular is vulnerable to sea level rise associated with global warming. This effect is exacerbated by the lack of sediments being deposited since the construction of the Aswan Dam. If the polar ice caps were to melt, much of the northern delta, including the ancient port city of Alexandria, could disappear under the Mediterranean. A 30 cm (12 in) rise in sea level could affect about 6.6% of the total land cover area in the Nile Delta region. At 1 m (3 ft 3 in) sea level rise, an estimated 887 thousand people could be at risk of flooding and displacement and about 100 km^{2} (40 sq mi) of vegetation, 16 km^{2} (10 sq mi) wetland, 402 km^{2} (160 sq mi) cropland, and 47 km^{2} (20 sq mi) of urban area land could be destroyed, flooding about 450 km^{2} (170 sq mi). Some areas of the Nile Delta's agricultural land have been rendered saline by sea level rise; farming has been abandoned in some places, while in others sand has been brought in to reduce the effect. In addition to agriculture, the delta's ecosystems and tourist industry could be hurt by global warming. Food shortages resulting from climate change could lead to seven million "climate refugees" by the end of the 21st century. Nevertheless, environmental damage to the delta is not currently one of Egypt's priorities.

The delta's coastline has also undergone changes in geomorphology as a result of the reclamation of coastal dunes and lagoons to form new agricultural land and fish farms as well as the expansion of coastal urban areas.

== Governorates and large cities ==
The Nile Delta forms part of these governorates:

- Cairo
- Alexandria
- Beheira
- Kafr el Sheikh
- Gharbiya
- Minufiya
- Qalyubiya
- Dakahlia
- Damietta
- Sharqiyah
- Port Said
- Ismailia
- Suez

Large cities located in the Nile Delta:

- Cairo
- Abusir
- Alexandria
- Avaris
- Bilbeis
- Bubastis
- Canopus
- Damanhur
- Desouk
- Damietta
- El Mahalla El Kubra
- Kafr El Sheikh
- Mendes
- Mansoura
- Pelusium
- Port Said
- Rosetta
- Sais
- Tanis
- Tanta
- Zagazig
