= Kafr El Sheikh Governorate =

Governorate of Egypt

Kafr El Sheikh Governorate محافظة كفر الشيخ
- Governorate
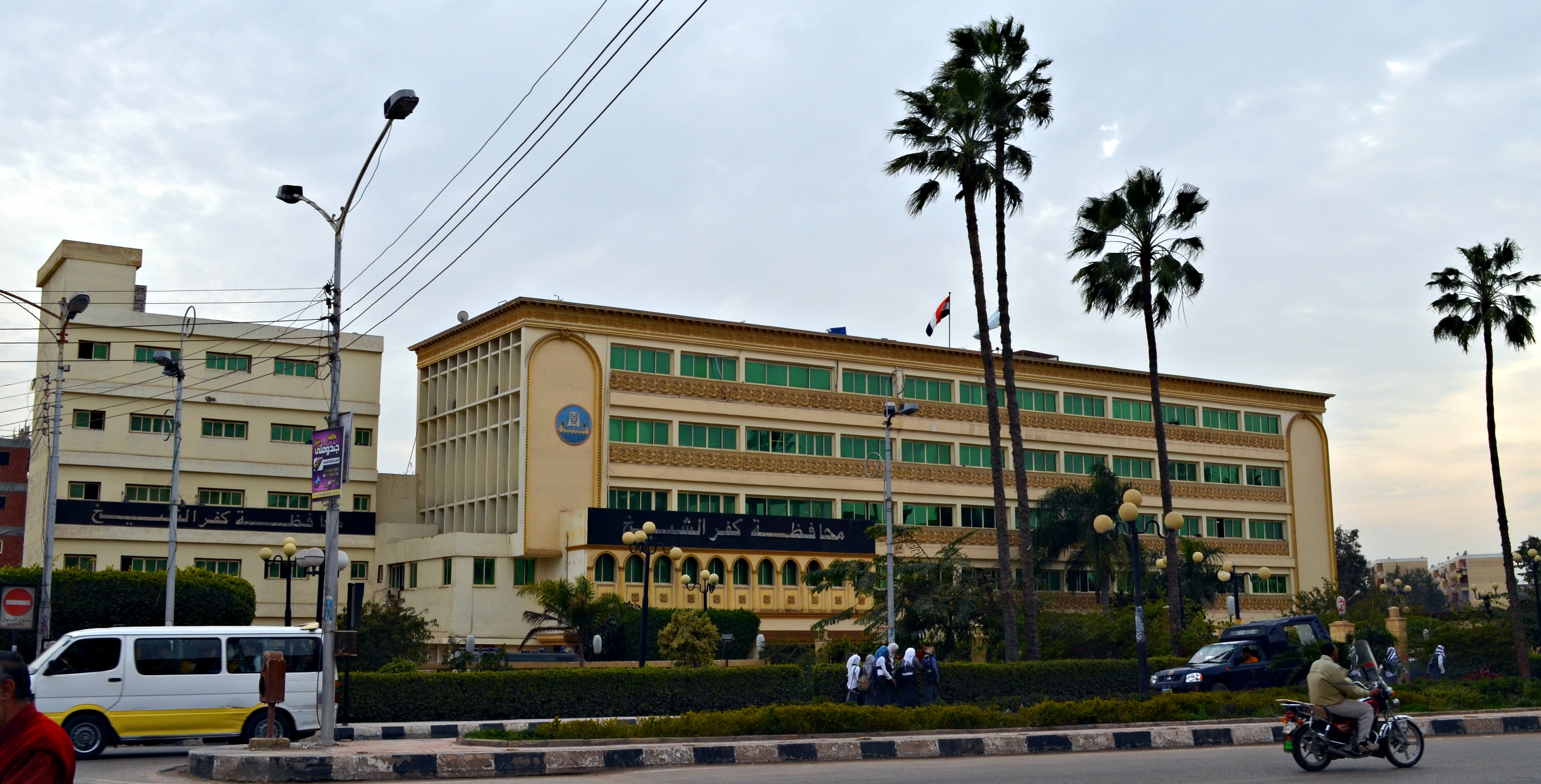

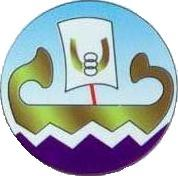
- Flag

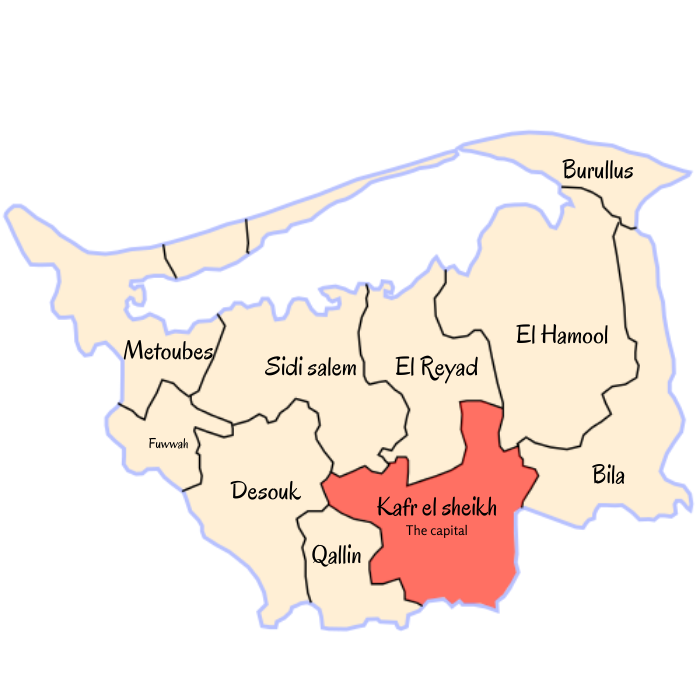
- Kafr El Sheikh Governorate subdivisions

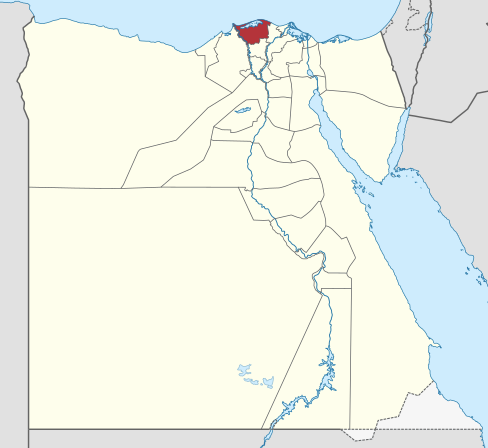
- Kafr El Sheikh Governorate on the map of Egypt
- Coordinates: 31.3°N 30.93°E
- Country: Egypt
- Seat: Kafr El Sheikh (capital)

Government
  - Governor: Alaa Ibrahim Abdelmoati

Area
  - Total: 3,437 km^{2} (1,327 sq mi)

Population (January 2023)
  - Total: 3,759,316
  - Density: 1,094/km^{2} (2,833/sq mi)

GDP
  - Total: EGP 151 billion (US$ 9.6 billion)
- Time zone: UTC+2 (EGY)
  - Summer (DST): UTC+3 (EEST)
- HDI (2021): 0.735 high · 11th
- Website: www.kafrelsheikh.gov.eg

Kafr El Sheikh (Arabic: محافظة كفر الشيخ) is one of the governorates of Egypt. It lies in the northern part of the country, along the western branch of the Nile in the Nile Delta. Its capital is the city of Kafr El Sheikh.

Kafr El Sheikh is the first nationwide in the cultivation of long-staple cotton for export.

== Overview ==
Kafr El Sheikh Governorate, which was once part of the Gharbia Governorate, was created in 1949. It was originally named Fuadiyah in honor of King Fuad I of Egypt. After the 1952 Revolution and the subsequent abolition of the monarchy, the governorate took the name of its capital city Kafr El Sheikh. This name, adopted in 1955, means "the village of the chief".

The area occupied today by the Kafr El Sheikh Governorate encompasses the ancient region of Bashmur and has been inhabited since ancient times and so it has a noteworthy number of archaeological sites, at Tell Metoubes, Fuwwah, Desouk, Tell Qabrit, and other settlements around Lake Burrulus. The capital of Lower Egypt, called "Buto", is located at present-day Tell El Faraain (the Hill of the Pharaohs), near Desouk.

== Municipal divisions ==
The governorate is divided into municipal divisions, with a total estimated population as of January 2023 of 3,695,336. In some instances there is a markaz and a kism with the same name.

Municipal Divisions
Anglicized name	Native name	Arabic transliteration	Population (January 2023 Est.)	Type
Burullus	مركز البرلس	Al-Burulus	259,358	Markaz
El Hamool	مركز الحامول	Al-Ḥāmūl	317,687	Markaz
El Reyad	مركز الرياض	Ar-Riyād	204,100	Markaz
Bila	قسم بيلا	Bilā	90,380	Kism (fully urban)
Bila	مركز بيلا	Bilā	236,766	Markaz
Desouk	قسم دسوق	Disūq	151,492	Kism (fully urban)
Desouk	مركز دسوق	Disūq	449,453	Markaz
Fuwa	مركز فوه	Fuwah	197,682	Markaz
Kafr el Sheikh	مركز كفر الشيخ	Kafr ash-Shaykh	489,054	Markaz
Kafr el Sheikh 1	قسم أول كفر الشيخ	Kafr ash-Shaykh 1	157,222	Kism (fully urban)
Kafr el Sheikh 2	قسم ثان كفر الشيخ	Kafr ash-Shaykh 2	40,212	Kism (fully urban)
Metoubes	مركز مطوبس	Muṭūbis	331,460	Markaz
Qallin	مركز قلين	Qallīn	290,876	Markaz
Sidi Salem	مركز سيدى سالم	Sīdī Sālim	479,594	Markaz

== Population ==
According to population estimates, in 2023 the majority of residents in the governorate lived in rural areas, with an urbanization rate of only 23.1%. Out of an estimated 3,759,316 people residing in the governorate, 2,890,914 people lived in rural areas as opposed to only 868,402 in urban areas.

== Cities and towns ==
Lake Burullus is located in the north of the Kafr El Sheikh governorate. The following are in Kafr El Sheikh:

- El Hamool
- Baltim
- Biyala
- Desouk
- Fuwwah
- Kafr El Sheikh
- Metoubes
- Qallin
- El Reyad
- Sidi Salem

== Industrial zones ==
According to the Governing Authority for Investment and Free Zones (GAFI), the following industrial zones are located in Kafr El Sheikh:

Zone name
Balteem Industrial Zone
Industrial Zone in Mlaha of Moneisi
Metoubas Industrial Zone and Its Extension

== Projects and programs ==
In 2016, Switzerland committed to funding a solid waste management program in Kafr El Sheikh, a project with the Egyptian Ministry of Environment that will conclude in 2021. The National Solid Waste Management Programme (NSWMP) involves the construction of infrastructure for new as well as the expansion and improvement of existing waste treatment, landfill, and recycling facilities.

== Economy ==
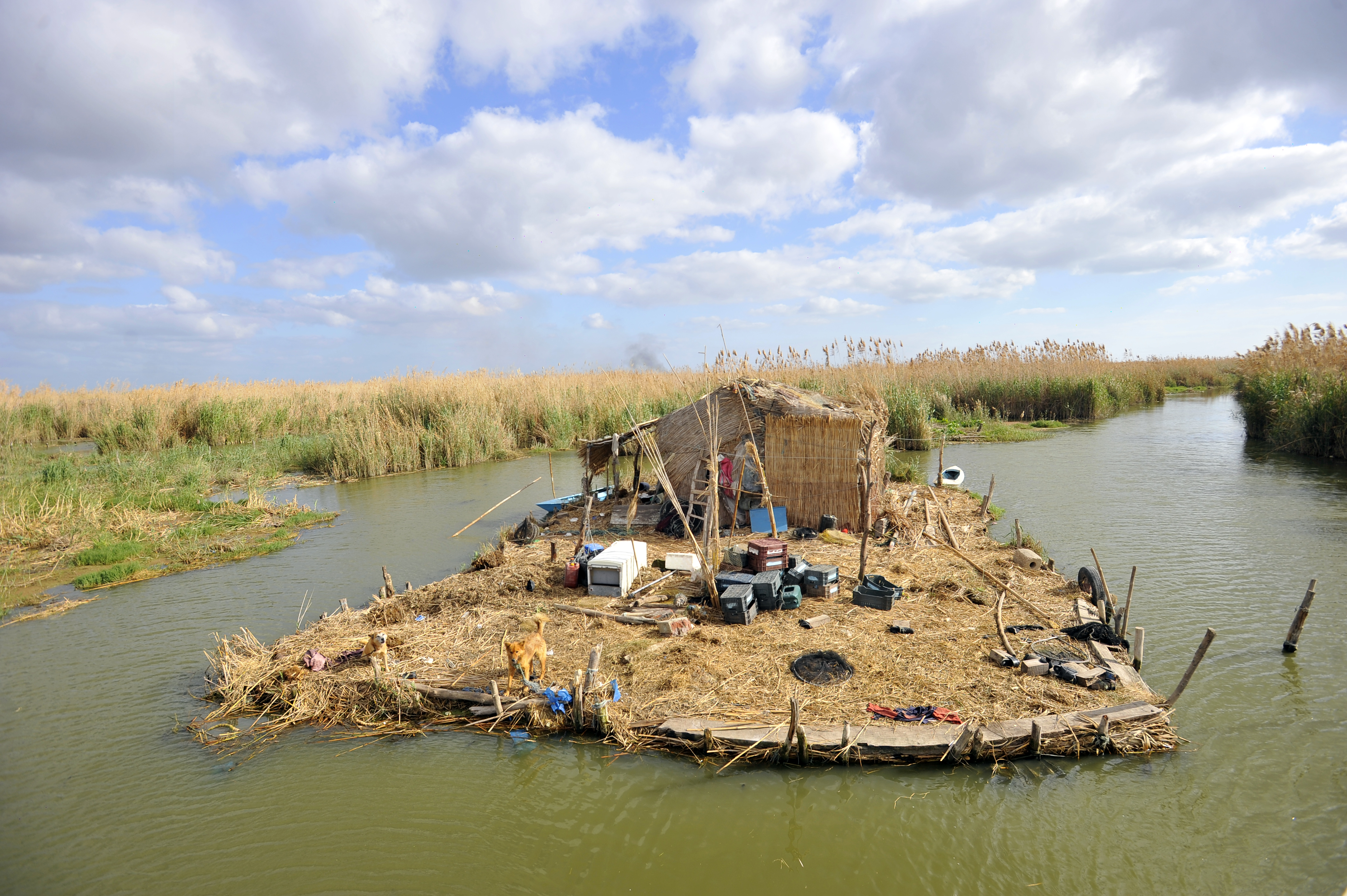
Local fishermen.

Industries include cotton-processing factories, rice and fishing. Kafr Elsheikh is also home to one of the biggest sugar factories in the region.

== Education ==
Kafr El Sheikh University comprises faculties for medicine, commerce, engineering, agriculture, veterinary medicine, arts, physical education, science, education, special education, dentistry, physical therapy, alsun and pharmacy.

== Notable people ==
- Saad Zaghloul (1859-1927) 17th Prime Minister of Egypt
- Mahmoud El Manhaly (born 1942) sugaring plants scientist
- Hamdeen Sabahi (born 1954) politician and journalist and leader of Egyptian Popular Current
- Ahmed Zewail (1946-2016) scientist and chemist and Nobel Prize winner
- Mamdouh Elssbiay (born 1984) professional bodybuilder
- Ashraf El-Shihy (born 1955) former minister of Higher Education and Scientific Research
- Ahmed Tantawi
- Tarek Yehia
- Mahmoud Trézéguet
- Mohamed El Shenawy
- Mohamed Atta
