= Kafr El Sheikh =

City in Egypt

Kafr El Sheikh كفر الشيخ Kafr esh-shekh
- City
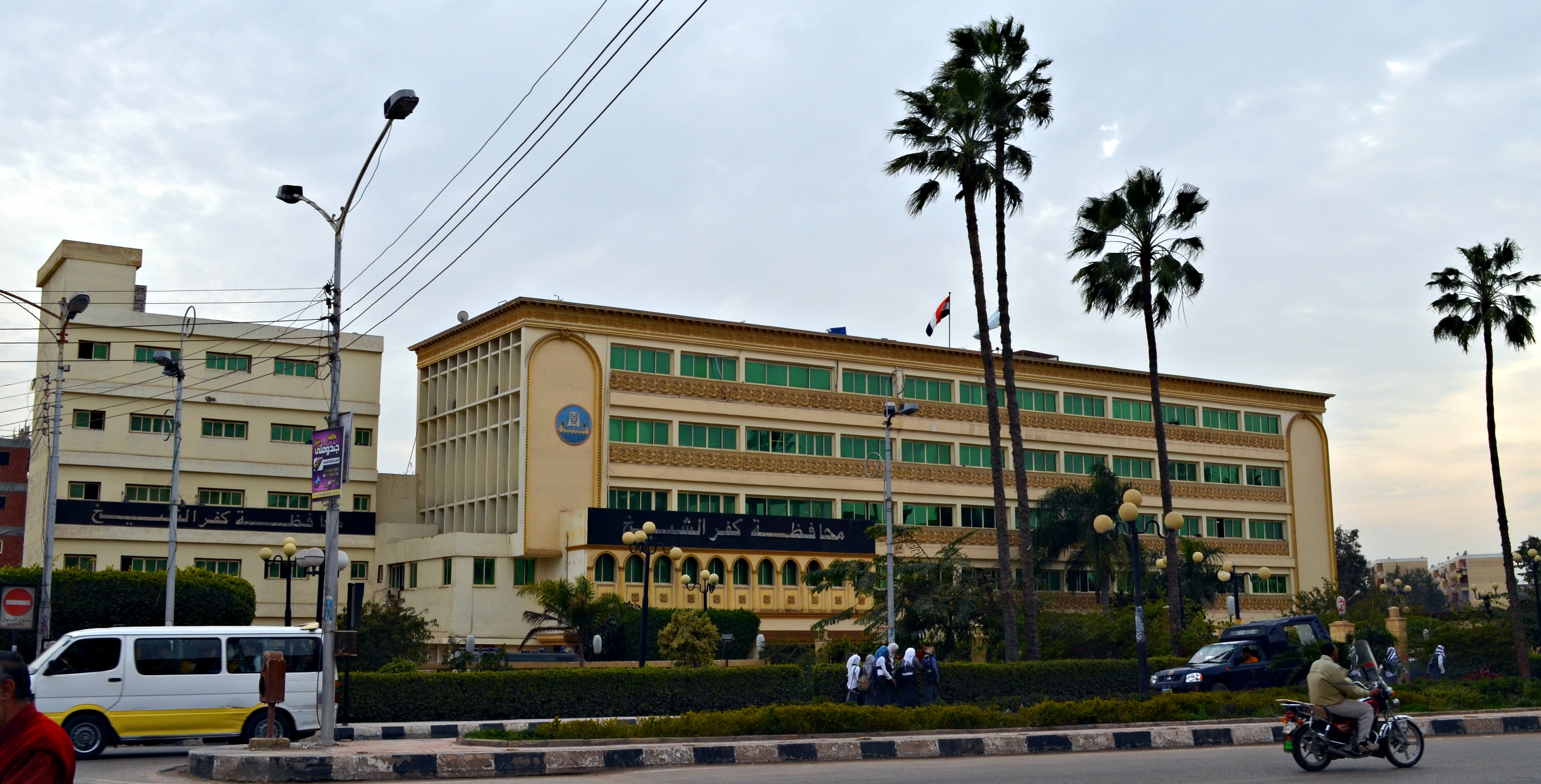
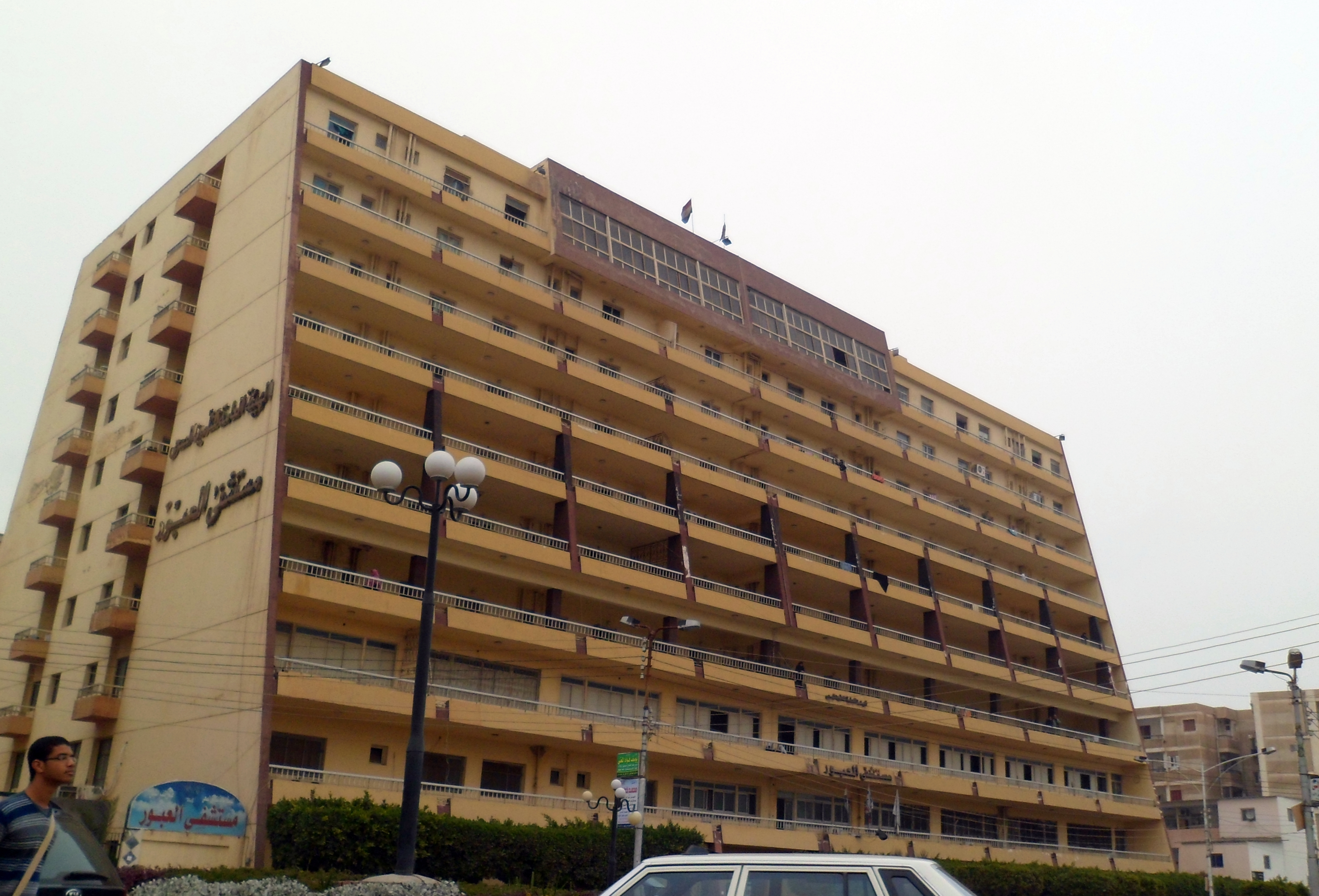
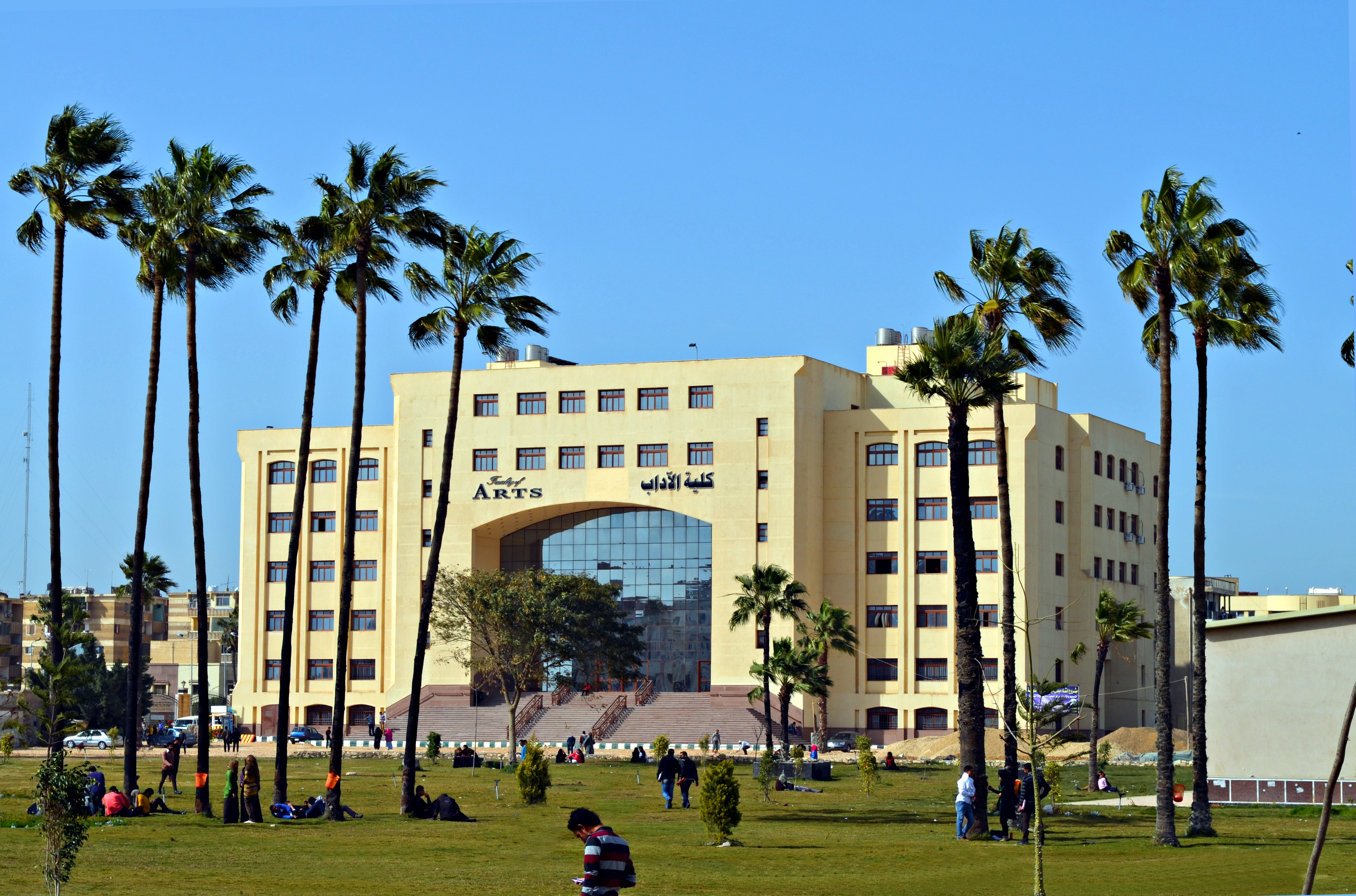
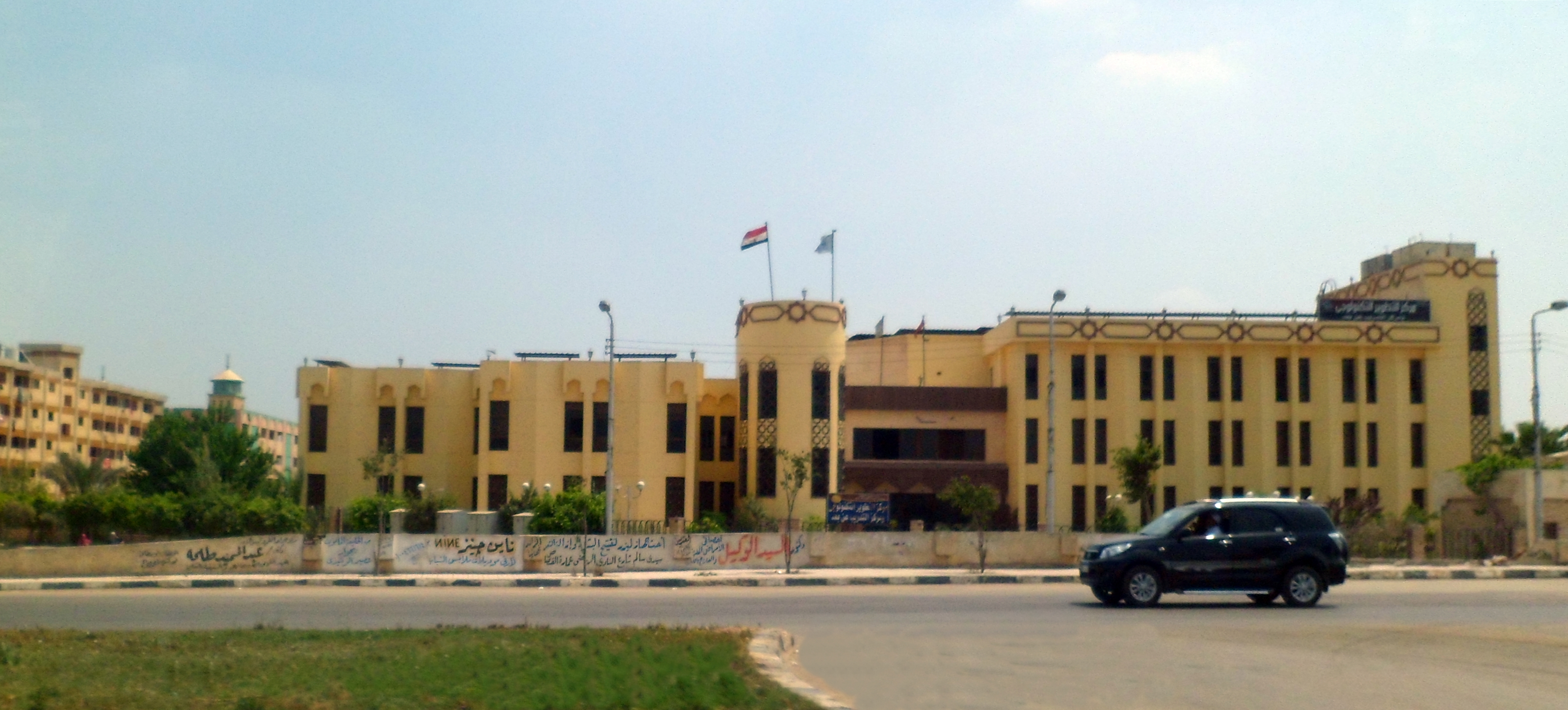
- City Hall Obour Hospital Kafr El Sheikh University Technology Development Center

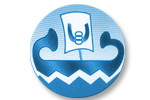
- Flag Seal

- Kafr El Sheikh in the Kafr El Sheikh Governorate of Egypt

- Location in Egypt
- Coordinates: 31°06′42″N 30°56′45″E
- Country: Egypt
- Governorate: Kafr El Sheikh
- National day: 4th of November
- Named for: A Sufi Saint

Area
  - Total: 19.3 km^{2} (7.5 sq mi)
- Elevation: 14 m (46 ft)

Population (2023)
  - Total: ~186,857 (Estimate)
  - Density: 9,600/km^{2} (24,800/sq mi)
- Time zone: UTC+2 (EET)
  - Summer (DST): UTC+3 (EEST)
- Postal code: 33511
- Area code: (+20) 47
- Website: http://www.kafrelsheikh.gov.eg

Kafr El Sheikh (Egyptian Arabic: كفر الشيخ, lit. 'village of the Sheikh' pronounced [kɑfɾ eʃˈʃeːx]) is an Egyptian city and the capital of Kafr El Sheikh Governorate, Egypt, about 134 km north of Cairo, in the Nile Delta of lower Egypt. As of 2023, the city had a population of around 186,857.

Kafr El Sheikh was earlier known as Duminqun (Arabic: دمينقون), but was officially named Fuadiyah or Fouadiyah (Arabic: فؤاديه) in honour of King Fuad I of Egypt. After the Egyptian Revolution of 1952 and the subsequent abolition of the monarchy, the governorate took the name of its capital city Kafr El Sheikh. This name, adopted in 1955, means "the village of the chief". In 2006 the University of Kafr El Sheikh was established.

== Etymology ==
The modern name of the city means "village of the sheikh", and refers to sheikh Talhha at-Tilmisānī, who died here in 1234. The older name of the city, Dumaynaqun (Arabic: دُمِيْنقُون), is reconstructed from Coptic by Engsheden as ⲑⲙⲟⲩⲓ ("island") + a personal name. This pattern is widely represented in Egyptian toponymy, so the name is expected to be Egyptian, but he proposes Nikon (Ancient Greek: Νίκων), which is unattested in Coptic sources, unable to find a suitable Egyptian name. In fact, a personal name Akon (Coptic: ⲁⲕⲱⲛ) is contained in place names like Pmounakon (Coptic: ⲡⲙⲟⲩⲛⲁⲕⲟⲛ, lit. 'the well of Akon') in the Hermopolite nome and Tmounakon (Coptic: ⲧⲙⲟⲩⲛⲁⲕⲱⲛ, lit. 'the island of Akon') near Oxyrhynchus, the latter of which could share its etymology with Dumaynaqun.

== Climate ==
Kafr el-Sheikh is classified by Köppen-Geiger climate classification system as hot desert (BWh).

Climate data for Kafr el-Sheikh, Egypt
Month	Jan	Feb	Mar	Apr	May	Jun	Jul	Aug	Sep	Oct	Nov	Dec	Year
Mean daily maximum °C (°F)	18.8 (65.8)	19.8 (67.6)	22.2 (72.0)	26 (79)	30.3 (86.5)	31.6 (88.9)	33.5 (92.3)	33 (91)	31.5 (88.7)	29.2 (84.6)	25 (77)	20.8 (69.4)	26.8 (80.2)
Daily mean °C (°F)	12.5 (54.5)	13.2 (55.8)	15.4 (59.7)	18.5 (65.3)	22.5 (72.5)	24.6 (76.3)	26.4 (79.5)	26 (79)	24.7 (76.5)	22.6 (72.7)	19 (66)	14.7 (58.5)	20.0 (68.0)
Mean daily minimum °C (°F)	6.3 (43.3)	6.6 (43.9)	8.6 (47.5)	11.1 (52.0)	14.7 (58.5)	17.7 (63.9)	19.4 (66.9)	19 (66)	18 (64)	16 (61)	13.1 (55.6)	8.6 (47.5)	13.3 (55.8)
Average precipitation mm (inches)	19 (0.7)	13 (0.5)	6 (0.2)	4 (0.2)	3 (0.1)	0 (0)	0 (0)	0 (0)	0 (0)	4 (0.2)	9 (0.4)	14 (0.6)	72 (2.9)
Source: Climate-Data.org

== Economy ==
The economy of Kafr El Sheikh is primarily driven by its strategic position in the Nile Delta, making it Egypt's leader in aquaculture and a vital agricultural hub.

Kafr El Sheikh is considered the capital of fishing of Egypt, producing nearly one-third of the nation's fish. It hosts major projects like the Baraket Ghalyoun fish farm, the largest of its kind in the Middle East.

Kafr El Sheikh is the home to various factories, including a rice mill, a poultry forage factory and a sugar beet factory.

== Culture ==
=== Museum ===
The city museum showcases artifacts, mostly from Buto. Notable exhibits include artifacts depicting the conflict between Horus and his uncle Set, as well as a remarkable statue of Horus the Falcon. The museum also highlights the period when the city of Sakha hosted the journey of the Holy Family in Egypt. The city of Fuwwah, known for its Islamic heritage, is also featured. The Kafr El Sheikh Museum was inaugurated by President El-Sisi in 2020.

=== Religious landmarks ===
==== Mosques ====
- Talha al-Tlemceni
- Abaza
- Al Malek
- Ibn Taimia
- Al Israa
- Ebad al Rahman
- Al Falaheen
- Al Fath (Stadium mosque)
- Al Khayat
- Abo al Azaem
- Sidi Qutb
- Al Rahman (Mosque of el 47 square)
- Sheikha Zahra Coptan

==== Churches ====
- Church of the Blessed Virgin Mary in Sakha
- Evangelical Church
- Church of St.Demiana and forty Virgins
- Saint George's Church

== Infrastructure ==
=== Education ===
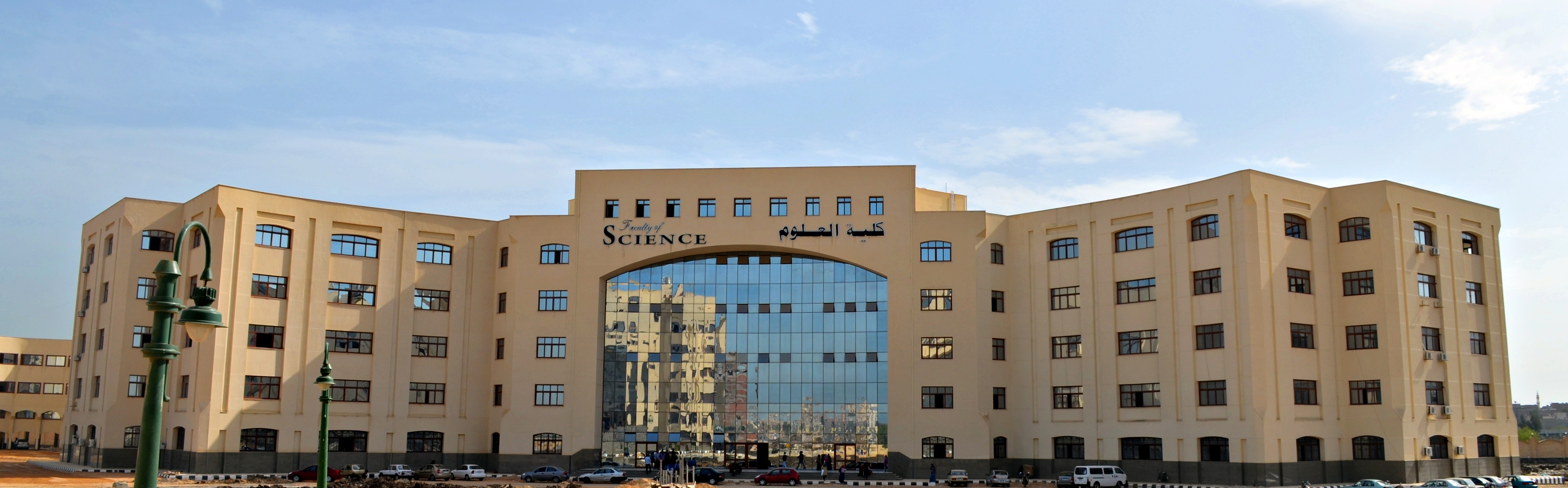
The faculty of science, Kafr El Sheikh University

The Governorate of Kafr el Sheikh is the holder of prestigious schools. It also has a university that has the following faculties:

- Faculty of Medicine
- Faculty of Commerce
- Faculty of Engineering
- Faculty of Agriculture
- Veterinary school
- Faculty of Arts

=== Sport ===
Kafr El Sheikh owns Kafr El Sheikh SC which competes in the Egyptian second division league.

== Notable people ==
- Hamdeen Sabahi, Egyptian politician, the leader of the Dignity Party and one of the leaders of the Egyptian opposition before the 2011 Egyptian revolution
- Trezeguet, Egyptian footballer
- Osama Anwar Okasha, Egyptian screenwriter and journalist
- Saad Zaghloul, Egyptian nationalist and politician
- Mohamed Atta, ringleader of the September 11 attacks and hijacker-pilot of American Airlines Flight 11.

== See also ==
- List of cities and towns in Egypt
