= Baltim =

- City
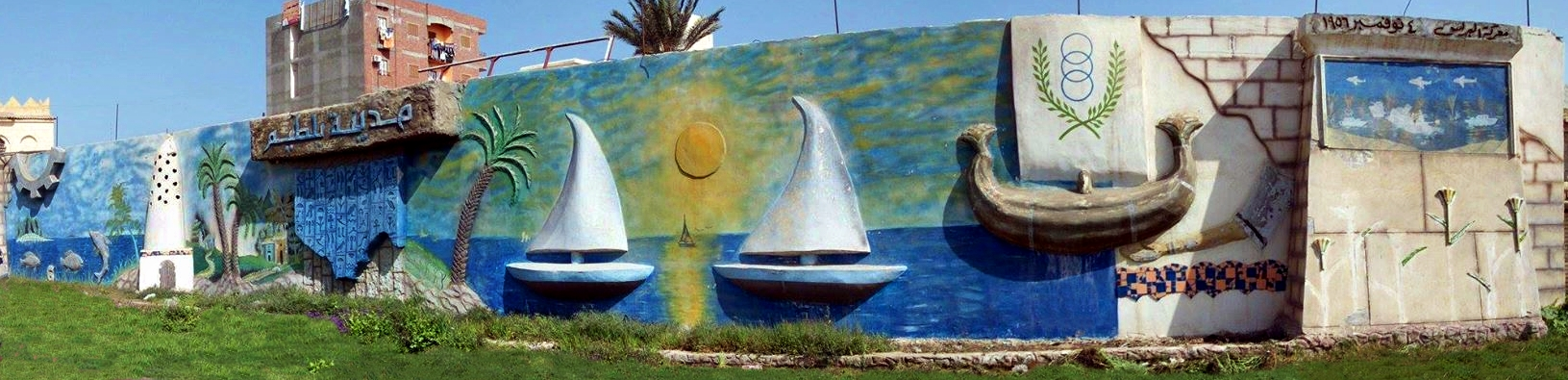
- Baltim resort center

- Location in Egypt
- Coordinates: 31°35′57″N 31°05′30″E
- Country: Egypt
- Governorate: Kafr El Sheikh

Area
  - Total: 13.8 sq mi (35.7 km^{2})

Population (2021)
  - Total: 51,280
  - Density: 3,720/sq mi (1,440/km^{2})
- Time zone: UTC+2 (EET)
  - Summer (DST): UTC+3 (EEST)
- Postal code: 33735

Baltim (Arabic: بلطيم pronounced [baltem]) is a city in the Kafr El Sheikh Governorate, in the north coast of Egypt.

== History ==
The second part of the town's name preserves Ancient Egyptian: tm.t "end, furthest part (of Egypt)".

Baltim was the beneficiary of a tax reduction under the reign of the Sultan Barquq. Ibn Battuta noted it as the capital of the district of Burullus, a position which it held through the late 1800s.

The 1885 Census of Egypt recorded Baltim as a nahiyah in the district of Aklim el-Borollos in Gharbia Governorate; at that time, the population of the city was 4,286 (2,182 men and 2,104 women).

== Climate ==
Baltim's climate is typical to the northern coastal line which is the most moderate in Egypt. It features a hot desert climate (Köppen: BWh), but prevailing winds from the Mediterranean Sea greatly moderate the temperatures, making its summers moderately hot and humid while its winters mild and moderately wet.

The hottest temperature recorded was on April 15, 1998 which was 41 °C (106 °F) and the coldest temperature was on February 8, 2006 which was 2 °C (36 °F).

Port Said, El Qoseir, Baltim, Damietta and Alexandria have the least temperature variation in Egypt, additionally, Rafah, Alexandria, Abu Qir, Rosetta, Baltim, Kafr El Dawwar and Mersa Matruh are the wettest.

Climate data for Baltim
Month	Jan	Feb	Mar	Apr	May	Jun	Jul	Aug	Sep	Oct	Nov	Dec	Year
Record high °C (°F)	27 (81)	31 (88)	36 (97)	41 (106)	38 (100)	40 (104)	39 (102)	39 (102)	39 (102)	38 (100)	34 (93)	29 (84)	41 (106)
Mean daily maximum °C (°F)	17.8 (64.0)	18.3 (64.9)	20.6 (69.1)	23.2 (73.8)	26.3 (79.3)	29.3 (84.7)	30 (86)	30.7 (87.3)	29.2 (84.6)	27.5 (81.5)	24.3 (75.7)	19.6 (67.3)	24.7 (76.5)
Daily mean °C (°F)	14.4 (57.9)	14.6 (58.3)	16.5 (61.7)	18.5 (65.3)	21.5 (70.7)	24.8 (76.6)	26.3 (79.3)	27 (81)	25.3 (77.5)	23.5 (74.3)	20.2 (68.4)	16 (61)	20.7 (69.3)
Mean daily minimum °C (°F)	11.1 (52.0)	10.9 (51.6)	12.4 (54.3)	13.8 (56.8)	16.7 (62.1)	20.4 (68.7)	22.6 (72.7)	23.4 (74.1)	21.5 (70.7)	19.5 (67.1)	16.2 (61.2)	12.4 (54.3)	16.7 (62.1)
Record low °C (°F)	3 (37)	2 (36)	4 (39)	9 (48)	9 (48)	12 (54)	19 (66)	12 (54)	13 (55)	13 (55)	10 (50)	7 (45)	2 (36)
Average precipitation mm (inches)	47 (1.9)	29 (1.1)	12 (0.5)	3 (0.1)	3 (0.1)	0 (0)	0 (0)	0 (0)	1 (0.0)	9 (0.4)	21 (0.8)	49 (1.9)	174 (6.8)
Source 1: Climate-Data.org
Source 2: Voodoo Skies for record temperatures

Another source reports less variable temperatures and more precipitation, which would classify it as a hot steppe climate (BsH) in the Koppen climate classification system.

Climate data for Baltim
Month	Jan	Feb	Mar	Apr	May	Jun	Jul	Aug	Sep	Oct	Nov	Dec	Year
Record high °C (°F)	24 (75)	25 (77)	30 (86)	31 (88)	36 (97)	35 (95)	35 (95)	33 (91)	33 (91)	31 (88)	28 (82)	25 (77)	36 (97)
Mean daily maximum °C (°F)	18 (64)	17 (63)	18 (64)	20 (68)	23 (73)	25 (77)	27 (81)	28 (82)	28 (82)	26 (79)	22 (72)	19 (66)	23 (73)
Daily mean °C (°F)	16 (61)	16 (61)	17 (63)	18 (64)	22 (72)	24 (75)	26 (79)	27 (81)	26 (79)	24 (75)	21 (70)	18 (64)	21 (70)
Mean daily minimum °C (°F)	14 (57)	14 (57)	15 (59)	16 (61)	19 (66)	22 (72)	24 (75)	25 (77)	24 (75)	23 (73)	20 (68)	17 (63)	19 (67)
Record low °C (°F)	5 (41)	5 (41)	8 (46)	11 (52)	15 (59)	18 (64)	21 (70)	22 (72)	21 (70)	18 (64)	15 (59)	10 (50)	5 (41)
Average precipitation mm (inches)	55.8 (2.20)	39.2 (1.54)	15.5 (0.61)	6.0 (0.24)	3.1 (0.12)	0.0 (0.0)	0.0 (0.0)	0.0 (0.0)	0.0 (0.0)	15.5 (0.61)	42.0 (1.65)	58.9 (2.32)	236 (9.29)
Source: MSN

== See also ==
- Battle of Baltim
- Northern coast of Egypt
- Climate of Egypt
- Geography of Egypt
- Mediterranean Sea
- List of cities and towns in Egypt
