= Lake Burullus =

Lake in Kafr el-Sheikh Governorate, Egypt

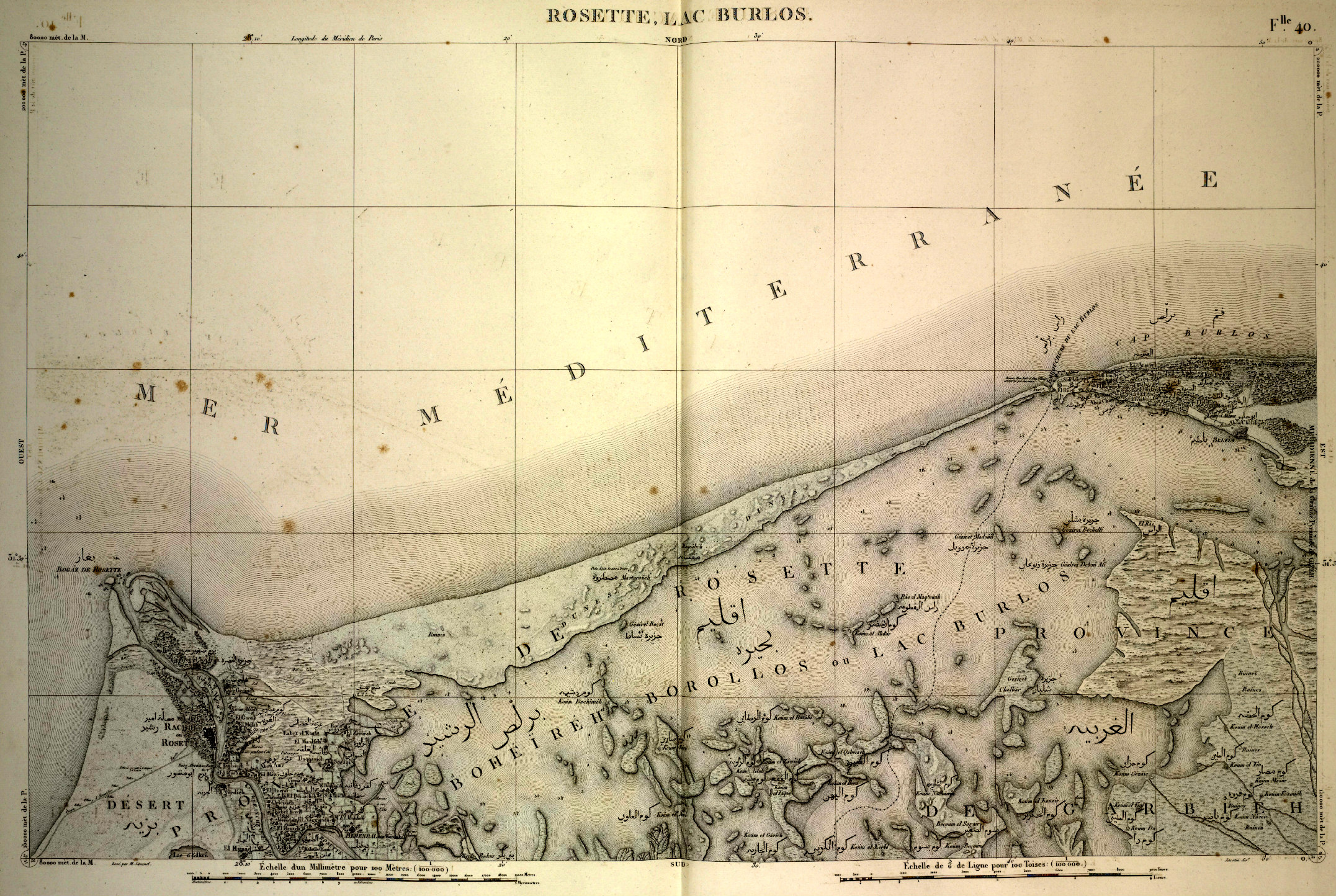
- Map of Lake Burullus from the early 19th century

- Location within Egypt
- Coordinates: 31°29′N 30°52′E
- Max. length: c. 54 km (34 mi)
- Max. width: 6–21 km (3.7–13.0 mi)
- Surface area: 46,200 ha (114,000 acres)
- Average depth: 75–100 cm (30–39 in)

Ramsar Wetland
- Designated: 9 September 1988
- Reference no.: 408

Lake Burullus (Arabic: بحيرة البرلس, romanized: Buḥayrat al-Burullus; Ancient Greek: λίμνη Σεβεννυτική, romanized: limnē Sebennytikē) is a brackish water lake in the Nile Delta in Egypt, the name coming from Burullus town (Coptic: Ϯⲡⲁⲣⲁⲗⲓⲁ, from Ancient Greek παράλιος, "coast, seaside" or ⲛⲓⲕⲉϫⲱⲟⲩ Nikejow). It is located in Kafr el-Sheikh Governorate east of Rosetta, bordered by the Mediterranean Sea in the north and agricultural land to the south.

== History ==
In the early Islamic period, the port of Burullus was situated near the mouth of the lake (the place where it was connected to the sea through a small opening). Burullus port functioned as one of the defensive frontier settlements of the Nile Delta coast. An island settlement within the lake called Nastaru lent its name to the lake as a whole. Canals connected the lake to the Rosetta branch of the Nile. At this time the lake was growing and expanding southwards as a result of changes in fluvial deposition and generalized substrate subsidence.

== Geography ==
Small island on Lake Burullus

The lake is separated from the sea by a strip of land approximately 5.5 km (3.4 mi) wide. It is connected to the Mediterranean by the Burullus outlet, a channel about 250 m (820 ft) wide and 5 m (16 ft) deep. There are approximately 50 islands in the lake with a total area of 0.7 km^{2} (0.27 sq mi). The lake's north shore is formed primarily of salt marshes and mudflats, while the south is mainly reed beds. The dominant lake vegetation is Potamogeton.

== Hydrology ==
The lake receives drainage waters from surrounding agricultural land and fresh water from the Brembal Canal. It is considered to be a lake and wetlands site of International importance for birds under the Ramsar Convention. Agriculture drainage water accounts for 97% of the total inflow to the lake (3.9 billion m^{3} per year), followed by rain water (2%) and groundwater (1%). 16% of the lake's water evaporates and 84% flows to the sea.

== Wildlife ==
Fishermen on Lake Burullus

According to a Biodiversity Report of the Egyptian Environmental Affairs Agency 33 species of fish, 23 species of reptiles, 112 species of birds, and 18 species of mammals live in and around the lake. Fish species declined from 52 recorded at the beginning of the 20th century, mostly due to the inflow of agricultural drainage into the lake resulting in lower salinity.
