= Ahmad El Najjar =

Ahmad Elnaggar (Arabic: أحمد النجّار) is the economist who pioneered the formation of the Islamic Banking system by setting up the Mit Ghamr Savings Bank in Egypt in 1963.

This took the form of a savings bank based on profit-sharing in the Egyptian town of Mit Ghamr. The experiment lasted until 1967, by which time there were nine such banks in the country. These banks, which neither charged nor paid interest (or riba in Islamic terminology), invested mostly by engaging in trade and industry, directly or in partnership with others, and shared the profits with their depositors. Thus they functioned in essence as saving-investment institutions rather than as commercial banks. Subsequently, The Nasir Social Bank, established in Egypt in 1971, was declared an interest-free commercial bank, although its charter and title made no reference to Islam or Sharia, for fear of being seen as a manifestation of Islamic fundamentalism which was anathema to the ruling regime of Egypt at the time.
