= Sultanate of Mit Ghamr =

Independent state in Mit Ghamr during the 1919 Egyptian Revolution against British rule

Sultanate of Mit Ghamr سلطنة ميت غمر (Arabic)
- 1919
- Anthem: "الحرية" (Arabic); English: "The Freedom"
- Status: Unrecognized state
- Capital: Mit Ghamr
- Common languages: Arabic
- Religion: Islam
- Government: Sultanate
  - Sultan: Ahmed Bey Abdo
- Historical era: Interwar period
  - Established: 1919
| Preceded by | Succeeded by |
| Sultanate of Egypt; British Empire | Sultanate of Egypt; British Empire |
- Today part of: Egypt

The Sultanate of Mit Ghamr (Arabic: سلطنة ميت غمر, Salṭanat Mīt Ghamr) was a sultanate declared by the city of Mit Ghamr in the Dakahlia Governorate following its declaration of independence from the Egyptian Sultanate, which was under British occupation during the 1919 Egyptian revolution. Ahmed Bey Abdo was installed as its sultan, and the sultanate lasted for two weeks. The Sultanate of Mit Ghamr is considered one of the independence movements that arose in Egypt during this period, along with the Republic of Zefta, the Kingdom of Faraskur, and the Empire of Minya.

== Background ==
In 1882, Britain occupied Egypt under the pretext of protecting its interests after Egypt failed to repay debts that began under Sa'id Pasha and worsened under Isma'il Pasha. In 1914, Britain deposed Abbas II and appointed Hussein Kamel as an independent Sultan under British protection, ending the Egyptian Khedivate, which had been under Ottoman control. The new government and subsequent administrations consisted of weak or fully pro-British figures. This led local populations in several cities to establish their own self-governing administrations to resist British rule. These separatist governments were part of a wider popular uprising movement, especially following the exile of Saad Zaghlul and his colleagues to Malta in 1919.

== The Rise of an Independent Sultanate ==
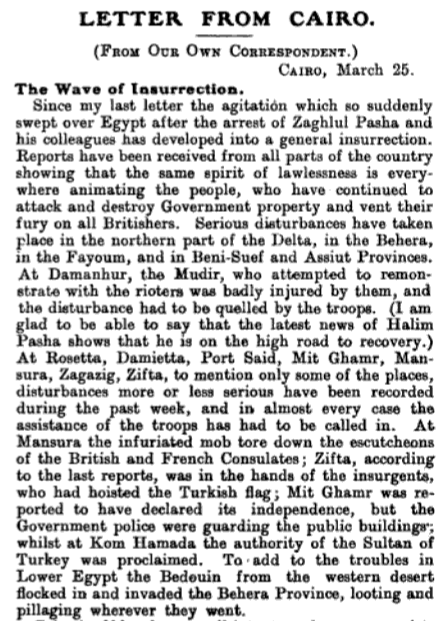
A report in the British journal The Near East, concerning the wave of unrest in Egypt following the exile of Saad Zaghlul and his companions, stated that Mit Ghamr was among the cities experiencing unrest and that it had declared its independence.

Following the 1919 revolution, the city of Mit Ghamr declared its independence from the Egyptian Sultanate, then ruled by Sultan Fuad I, and formed a political entity known as the "Sultanate of Mit Ghamr." Ahmed Bey Abdo was chosen as its sultan, (Note: Ahmed Abdo Bey was a wealthy resident of the city and a member of the Egyptian Parliament during the first half of the twentieth century, representing Mit Ghamr in the Senate. He began his parliamentary career in 1924 and subsequently rose to prominence in the Mit Ghamr constituency, winning elections in 1930 and 1936, as well as securing re-election in 1941. Following the conclusion of his parliamentary tenure in 1946, he was appointed as a representative for Fuad I University, a position he held until 1956 (see, for example, *LE MONDAIN ÉGYPTIEN*, 1938, p84). His name remains present in the city today through "Ahmed Abdo Street," where his former mansion—now the city’s administrative headquarters—is located.) and students from secondary and higher schools who had not been arrested, along with a number of workers, were appointed to the National Guard, while a local government was formed from notables. During this period, the city's district officer, Omar Bey Wahbi, and his men remained in their homes.

== Events at the Beginning of Independence ==
=== The First Demonstrations ===
The city witnessed daily demonstrations, the first of which was led by lawyers Mahmoud Hosni and Andrawes Rizk, and agricultural engineer Saad Youssef Saad, in front of the district building. During the demonstration, one of the participants began chanting "Long live independence!" and the crowds followed suit. The leaders of the demonstration mounted their horses and paraded through the city streets. The city streets witnessed demonstrations in which Muslims and Christians participated together. (Note: Sectarian tensions between Muslims and Christians existed in Egypt even before the 1919 revolution. These tensions persisted—particularly from 1910 onwards—following the assassination of Prime Minister Boutros Ghali Pasha by Ibrahim al-Wardani; the British claimed that the assassination was motivated by religious intolerance rather than by the Prime Minister’s perceived alignment with them. Further contributing to the friction were the Coptic Congress held in Asyut and the corresponding Islamic Congress in Heliopolis, as well as articles published in the Coptic-affiliated magazines *Al-Watan* and *Misr*, which provoked harsh counter-responses.) The aim of the demonstrations was to strengthen national unity among Egyptians of different sects and foreigners residing in Mit Ghamr, (Note: The city of Mit Ghamr was home to a number of foreign communities, including Greeks, Armenians, Italians, French, and others.) Later, students from Mit Ghamr learned that a group of their fellow townsmen were on a boat bound for Mansoura. They waited for them, singing the "Anthem of Freedom," which begins:

"Messenger of peace to Egypt,

Spread goodness for us in the East,

Scatter flowers for us in the streets,

Nay, let the world rejoice with glad tidings."

=== Workers' Participation ===
Workers from the Mit Ghamr Locomotive and Vehicle Repair Center, which employed around 500 workers, When the revolution broke out, all these workers went on strike. Despite the British manager's threat of dismissal, they continued their strike. Part of the center had been converted into a war production facility for the British armies in the Middle East during World War I, where the workers manufactured hand grenades for the British forces. They later joined the demonstrations with the crowds. Before each demonstration, a message was addressed to the crowd, emphasizing the national character of the protest and warning against any sectarian or racist behavior, which would be considered a betrayal of the movement. After each demonstration, a preparatory meeting for the next demonstration was held in Al-Ghamri Mosque and a Coptic church, (Note: It is worth noting that the Al-Ghamri Mosque was built during the Burji Mamluk era in the fifteenth century; however, it collapsed in 1970, leaving behind only its minaret, known as the Al-Ghamri Minaret.) to ensure coordination among the participants.

== Workers' activity and railway work ==
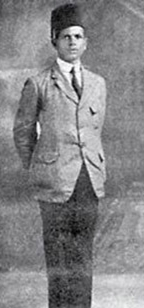
Aryan Youssef Saad

The residents gathered in one of the churches. After the sheikh of the Al-Ghamri Mosque delivered a sermon and embraced the priest, the priest then gave his own sermon. Following this, nineteen-year-old Coptic medical student Aryan Youssef Saad addressed the congregation, stating that their marches through the streets of Mit Ghamr were futile, that the threat of British soldiers and their occupation of the city remained, and that if they came, they would arrive by train. Therefore, the demonstrations should be transformed into action to prevent the British from entering the city by cutting the railway. His speech concluded with applause from all those present and chants of support for Egypt, Saad Zaghlul, and freedom. At midnight, workshop workers, led by Aryan Youssef Saad, began cutting railway tracks along a stretch of about 8 kilometers from the city, starting from the village of Mit Al-Qurashi, The workers divided themselves into groups, each group using wrenches to loosen the bolts that connected the rails to the sleepers. It wasn't long before the first rail was pulled out, and they tossed each one into a nearby field. This process was repeated, and the rails continued to be pulled out one after another until the first light of dawn appeared. The following night, the same operation was carried out again.

=== Australian Patrol Report ===
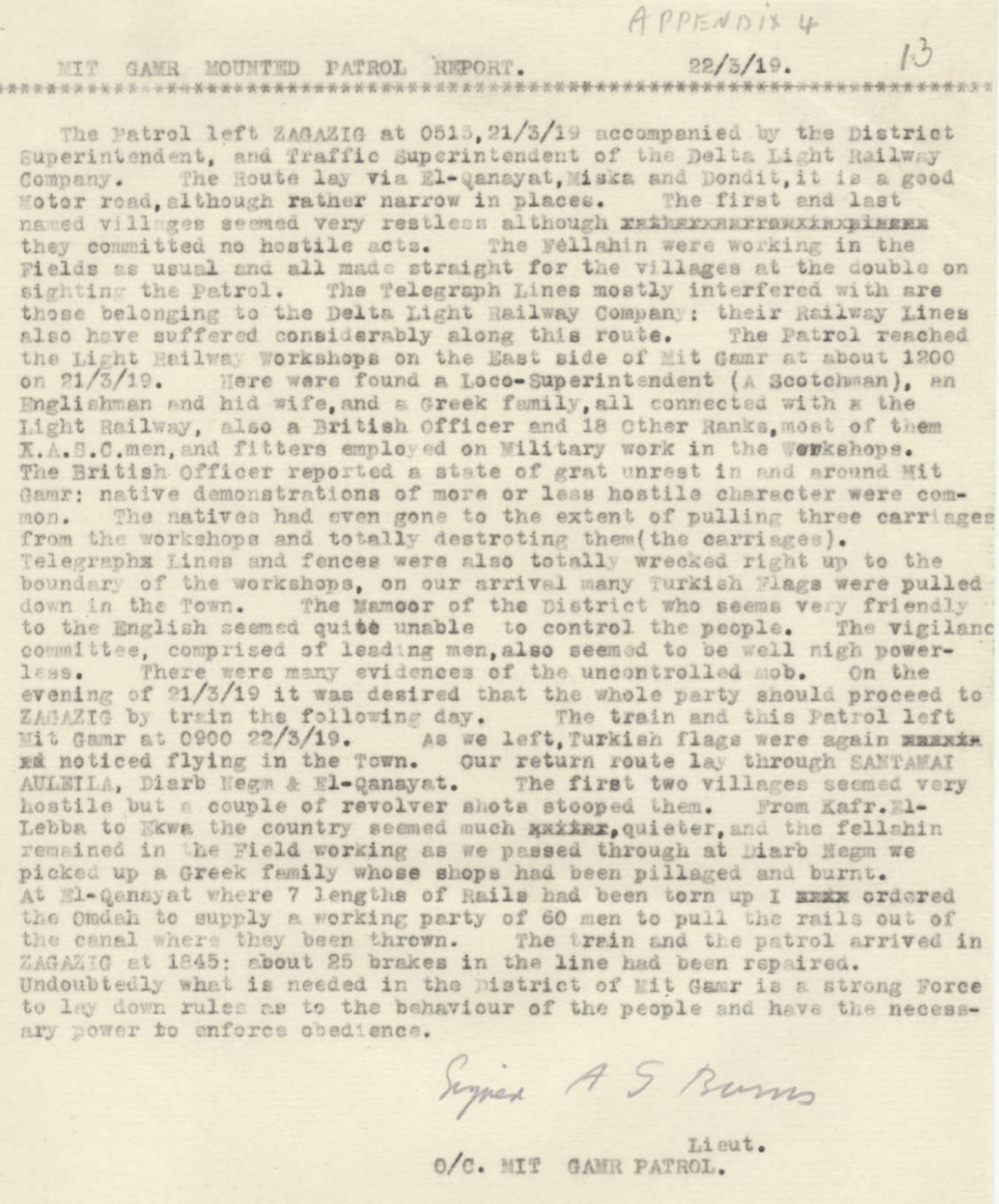
Report of the Australian patrol in Mit Ghamr

On March 21, 1919, an Australian patrol departed Zagazig at 5:15 a.m. and arrived at the workshops on the eastern side of Mit Ghamr around 12:00 p.m. Their objective was to assess the situation following escalating unrest in the area. The patrol found a British officer and eighteen other officers, along with technicians working in the military workshops and some foreign workers, both English and Greek. The British officer reported a state of extreme anxiety in and around Mit Ghamr, where hostile demonstrations had taken place. These demonstrations had culminated in the complete destruction of three carriages from the workshops, as well as damage to telegraph lines and the perimeter fences. Upon the patrol's arrival, several Turkish flags were observed being lowered from buildings within the city. On the morning of March 22, the patrol departed Mit Ghamr by train, and Turkish flags were again observed flying in the city. (Note: Egypt officially separated from the Ottoman Empire in 1914, when Britain declared a protectorate over it during the First World War. Nevertheless, a degree of loyalty to the Ottoman Empire persisted among some Egyptians—particularly those who subscribed to the concept of Pan-Islamism and viewed the Ottoman state as the seat of the Caliphate. Consequently, raising the Ottoman (Turkish) flag became a symbol of rebellion against the British presence, as Britain was at war with the Ottoman Empire at the time.) The report concluded by stating the need to send a strong force to the area to establish rules regulating the behavior of the population and to enforce obedience, with the aim of quelling the unrest in Mit Ghamr.

=== Mit al-Qurashi massacre ===
When the British military train reached the village of Mit al-Qurashi on its way to Mit Ghamr on March 23, the soldiers were surprised to find a cut in the railway track. Believing the train to be under ambush, they opened fire on a funeral procession heading from the village to the cemetery. The incident resulted in eighteen deaths, among them was the son of the village mayor, and a number of others, including women, were injured. (Note: According to the English account, a train was engaged in track repairs on March 22 when protesters isolated it by cutting the line both in front of and behind it. On March 23, an armed train arrived at the scene to assist, but it too was attacked by the protesters—who, in the process, suffered over a hundred casualties, including both dead and wounded.) At noon, a guard from Mit al-Qurashi arrived in Mit Ghamr and reported the incident to the police station. The district doctor and the district officer traveled to the village by car, and the doctor authorized the burial of the dead. The people of the city did not attempt to block the railway again. The British military authorities, in their official report, indicated that Mit Ghamr, along with Zefta and Mit al-Qurashi, remained a center of rebellion and unrest.

== The End of the Sultanate ==
=== Arrival of British Forces ===
On March 24, a contingent of 300 New Zealand cavalry arrived on horseback, led by Mr. Shepheard, the Ministry of Agriculture inspector in Zagazig. He was directing the contingent's colonel to the city. (Note: In every region occupied by English forces, the highest-ranking English official in the district—or one of similar standing—would assume oversight of the force commander.) Upon their arrival, the National Guard disappeared, and the district officer returned to his office. Mr. Shepheard demanded a list of names of the sultan and self-governing government from the district officer. However, Officer Omar Bey Wahbi, a staunch supporter of the Sultanate, denying any knowledge of them, explaining that he owed his position to the notables who had helped him maintain security and stability in the city. Nevertheless, Mr. Shepheard insisted on the arrest of a lawyer and a young student for participating in the demonstrations. This insistence came after local spies had informed the authorities about the independence movement and the National Guard. (Note: During the 1919 revolution, a minority of Egyptians collaborated with the British occupation, driven by personal interests. Among them were certain individuals in the city of Mit Ghamr, who assisted the British by monitoring the movements of the revolutionaries and informing them of attempts to resist the occupation and seek independence.) The two men were taken to the main occupation camp in Zagazig. (Note: About two months later, the two returned; no one came forward to testify against them, so they were not sentenced.) At the end of the conversation, after Mr. Shepheard failed to compel Officer Omar Bey to write a report listing the names of the workers, students, and notables who had usurped power from him, Shepheard insulted him in colloquial Arabic, saying, "You're a worthless officer!" Official reports were prepared stating that Mit Ghamr had established an independent self-government and begun levying taxes. These reports reached the authorities by March 26th.

=== Occupation of the City ===
Shepheard's forces occupied the Mit Ghamr railway station, making it the colonel's headquarters. Machine guns were mounted on the rooftops, and tents were pitched near the station by the market. Strict restrictions on movement were imposed; no one was allowed to enter or leave the city without the commander's personal permission. With these measures, the independent sultanate ended two weeks after its proclamation.

== Aftermath ==
=== The strike and the founding of the secret society ===
After permits were imposed for entering or leaving the city, some of the resident farmers approached Mr. Shepheard to request permits for their horse-drawn carts to travel to their lands in the neighboring villages. Shepheard refused their request and told them to use camels instead. However, the interpreter, Aryan Youssef Saad, explained that these were elderly men, none of whom had ever ridden a camel, and that the carts posed no security threat. Shepheard remained firm in his refusal, and the farmers returned home. Subsequently, the city's employees and lawyers went on a general strike, with the exception of one employee: the Public Prosecutor's secretary. Following this, some of the city's residents formed a secret society whose aim was to assassinate or threaten British officers and commanders residing in Mit Ghamr, or Egyptians loyal to them. The lawyer Mahmoud Hosni assumed leadership of this society. (Note: Mahmoud Hosni, a lawyer, was one of the leaders of the first demonstration in Mit Ghamr. Initially a member of the National Party, he later switched his allegiance and joined the Wafd Party, as did many others at the time.) Their first operation targeted the Public Prosecutor's secretary, who had refused to participate in the strike.

=== The fall of society ===
Mahmoud Hosni ordered his followers to keep an eye on the man. That night, as he was returning home, three members of the society surrounded him. One of them placed the muzzle of a pistol against his chest, saying, "We don't want the first blood spilled in Mit Ghamr to be Egyptian blood. This is a warning to you: if you don't stand with your colleagues, your blood will be on your own head!"

The secretary trembled and promised not to disobey his colleagues again. The men then left him and went away. Fear gripped the residents of Mit Ghamr, as rumors spread that the "Black Hand Society" had established a branch in the city. However, the local members felt weak due to their lack of weapons and their complete disconnection from the parent organization in Cairo. Therefore, one of the members traveled to Cairo, attempting to contact its leadership and request support in the form of weapons and bombs. The man returned from Cairo with a promise, relayed by a law student who was a member of the society there, that they would provide fast motorcycles equipped with a concealed compartment for a German-made pistol capable of hitting a target from a distance of a thousand meters. However, time passed without those promises being fulfilled, and the society remained without real support.
