= Najib Kilani =

Egyptian poet

- Born: Najeeb Abdul Latif Ibrahim Al Kilani; June 1, 1931; Egypt, Gharbia Governorate Zefta Shershaba village
- Died: March 7, 1995 (aged 63)
- Education: Cairo University

Naguib al-Kilani (June 1, 1931 - March 7, 1995) was an Egyptian poet and novelist.

== Early life ==
Naguib Abd al-Latif Ibrahim al-Kilani was born in June 1931 AD, corresponding to Muharram 1350 AH. He was taken to the village of Shershaba, affiliated with the Zefta Center in the Gharbia Governorate in Egypt. At the age of four, he learned reading, writing, arithmetic, some hadiths, the biography of Muhammad, the stories of the prophets, and the stories of the Qur’an. His family worked in agriculture. Since he was young, he worked with the family's children in the fields.

He joined the primary school, the American Missionary Primary School in the village of Sunbat, then spent high school in the city of Tanta, and finally joined the Faculty of Medicine in Cairo in 1951 AD. After graduating, he worked as a “distinction doctor” at “Umm Al Masryeen Hospital” in Giza in 1961 AD. He was a practicing doctor in his village, then moved to work in the Ministry of Transport and Communications. He received his job in the medical department of the Railways Authority. He traveled to the State of Kuwait to work as a doctor there on the thirty-first day of March 1968 AD, then he moved from there to the United Arab Emirates and spent nearly sixteen years there.

In 1960, Al-Kilani married the Islamic writer Karima Shaheen, sister of the Egyptian radio writer Nafisa Shaheen, and had three sons.

== Al-Kilani and the Brotherhood ==
Najeeb Al-Kilani joined the Brotherhood's call at an early age. It affected his ideas and beliefs, provided him with much knowledge and religious and worldly sciences, and had the most significant impact on forming his political mentality. Najib began to get acquainted with the Muslim Brotherhood group in Zefta through the celebration held in Mit Ghamr to celebrate the occasion of Muhammad's migration in 1948 AD. The reason for rallying around this group was to find a new style of rhetoric and celebration of religious occasions, so he opened his heart and mind to what he heard from them, and what caught his eye was the chants that they chanted, as it was expected - at that time - that most parties chant about the lives of leaders and prominent people with them. However, on that night, he heard a unique chat (God is great, praise be to God, God is our goal, the Messenger is our leader, the Qur'an is our constitution, jihad is our way, death for the sake of God is our highest wish).

These were the lectures held by the Muslim Brotherhood, as he said: "The richest and strongest of these centers are in intellectual and culturally oriented giving. They linked all these topics with the bond of Islam, as they held poetry festivals, Islamic theater, and sports."

He was arrested more than once. After the Al-Manshiya incident on October 26, 1954, AD, Abdel Nasser detained many of the Muslim Brotherhood, brought them to trial, and sentenced them to various sentences, leaving their families without a breadwinner. Nasser's regime did so, so he arrested everyone who helped these families and brought them to court under the name of organizing funding. Najib al-Kilani was one of those arrested on August 7, 1955, AD. He was taken to the military prison and sentenced to ten years in jail, but he was granted a health pardon. He was released after serving 40 months in jail.

== Works ==
=== Novels ===
His first prose work in detention in 1956 AD, inaugurated by the novel The Long Way, which won the award of the Ministry of Education in 1957 AD and then decided to teach secondary school students in the second grade of secondary in 1959 AD.

• “Alyaom Almaood” (The Promised Day) novel, 1960, which won the award of the Supreme Council for the Sponsorship of Arts and Letters in Egypt in the same year,

• “Fi Aldalam” (In the dark), a novel that won the same award in the following year, 1961, AD

• The novel “Katilu Hamza” (Hamza's killer)

• “Ahlu Alhamidiyah” (The people of Hamidiyah)

• “Mamlakat Albalooti” (the Kingdom of Balouti)

• “Noor Allah” (Allah's light)

• “Lail Wa Kuthban” (Night and bars)

• “Rijal Wa thiaab” (Men and wolves)

• “Hikayat Jad Allah” (The story of Gad Allah)

• “Mawakibu Alahrar” (Processions of the free)

• “Omar Yadharu Fi Alkudus” (Omar appears in Jerusalem)

• “Layali Turkumistan” (Nights of Turkestan)

• “Amalikat Alshamal” (Giants of the North)

• “Ameerat Aljabal” (Princess of the Mountain)

• “Athraa Jakitra” (Virgin Jakarta)

• “Itarafaat Abdul Motajalli” (Confessions of Abdul Motjalli)

• “Imraa Abdul-Mutajalli” (The woman of Abdul-Mutjalli)

• “Alkaboos” (The Nightmare)

• “Rihlatun Ila Allah” (Journey to God)

• “Alrayat Alsaodaa” (Black bunting)

• “Malikat Alinab” (The Queen of Grapes)

• “Alnida Alkhalid” (The Eternal Appeal)

=== Stories ===
• “Inda Alraheel” (When you leave)

• “Maoiduna Gadan” (Our date is tomorrow)

• “Alaalam Aldayik” (The narrow world)

• “Rijal Allah” (Men of God)

• “Faris Hawazin” (Fares Hawazen)

• “Hikayat Tabeeb” (Doctor's Tales)

• “Alkaboos” (The Nightmare)

=== Writings ===
• “Almujtama Almaradi” (Sick community)

• “Alislam Wa Alkuwa Almudatha” (Islam and counter forces)

• “Altareek Ila Itihaad Islami” (The road to an Islamic union)

• “Madkhal Ila Aladab Alislami” (Introduction to Islamic literature)

• “Alislammiya Wa Almathahib Aladabiyya” (Islamic and literary doctrines)

• “Afaq Aladab Alislami” (Horizons of Islamic Literature)

• “Aladab Alislami Baina Alnadarriya Wa Altatbeeq” (Islamic literature between theory and practice)

• “Tajrubati Althateeyya Fi Alkissa Alislammiya” (My personal experience in the Islamic story)

• “Lamahat Min Hayati” (Glimpses of my life), an autobiography

• “Iqbal, Alshaeir Althaer” (Iqbal, the revolutionary poet)

• “Shawki Fi Rikab Alkhalideen” (My longing for the passengers of the immortals)

• “Fi Rihaab Altib Alnabawi” (In the rehab of the Prophet's medicine)

== Awards ==
He won the 1958 novel and short story award

• Taha Hussein's gold medal from Al-Qasra Club, 1959,

• The Supreme Council for Arts and Letters, 1960,

• Arabic Language Academy Award, 1972,

• Gold Medal from the President of Pakistan, 1978.

== Features of his books ==
Kilani is known to be the only writer who came out with the novel outside his country's borders and toured it and many other countries, interacting with their different environments. On the Walls of Damascus and in Palestine, Omar appears in Jerusalem, Indonesia in The Virgin of Jakarta, and Turkestan in Turkestan Nights. He predicted the fall of communism more than thirty years ago. Generally, if the writer cannot foresee and predict next to the artistic vision, his works are meaningless.

== Writers' opinions about Najib ==
Jaber Qameha said that Al-Kilani has a deep sense of intensifying the artistic beauty of ambiguity sometimes in some of his works. However, he does not forget his responsibility towards the reader and his fear of falling into the clutches of misunderstanding, full time.

As confirmed, Dr. Helmy Al-Qaoud asserted that Najib Al-Kilani was unique in deciphering the spatial and temporal spaces in his works through his professionalism and hospitality, inaccurate analysis, and miniatures, and was able to fill the arena with the correct alternative.

As Naguib Mahfouz said about him in the October 1989 issue: "Naguib Al-Kilani is the theorist of Islamic literature now." This is because his critical statements and his novel and short stories constitute the features of a literary theory that has its size and strong evidence, which was reinforced by his studies on "The Perspectives of Islamic Literature," "Islamic and Literary Doctrines," "Islamic Literature between Theory and Practice" and "An Introduction to Islamic Literature," and My personal experience in the Islamic story.

== The rhymes in his poems ==
Muhammad Hassan Abdullah said that Al-Kilani's productions are purposeful; believer and mystic's depth and transparency seem to flash between the lines.

In his poetry, Kilani is no less important than his stories and novels, as he is the poet of "The Untouchable Hope," who possesses the cornerstone of rhythm and creativity through his eight volumes, which speak of authentic art, with controls and ends, through the suggestive word, the divine tone, and the subtle touch of the rules of fine art, where he says:

I don't want to live on the shore of a strange world

In the stronghold of gloomy silence on the soil of a terrible valley

Sadness is my song, and my dreams are pale

I do not accept to be a poor echo in the paths

Life for a stranger is more complex than the horror of death

Najwa's bed is tormented by thoughts and traits

And its sunrise is like sunset, and they sang it to the melody of mourning

It is the empty void and the burial place of wishes

== Poetic stories ==
Kilani was able to use several methods of narrating in his poetry, such as symbols, convincing dialogue, narration, successive expression, flashbacks (remembering the past and going back) and paradox, and clips cut through the unique, expressive forms and contents, as Dr. Jaber Qameha, the first of his collections of "Nahwa Al-Ula" in 1950 in high school times, the last of which was "The Pearl of the Gulf," which is the unfinished book, as well as "How to Meet You," "The Age of Martyrs," "Songs of Strangers" and "City of Major Sins," and Migrant" and "Songs of the Long Night."

He published his first collection of poetry while he was in the fourth year of high school, under the title: Towards Al-Ula, and it was published after that.

== His poetry collections ==
• Songs of Strangers, 1963

• the era of martyrs,

• How can I meet you, 1978

• Migrant, 1986

• The City of Sins, 1988

• Songs of the Long Night, 1990.

== Social life ==
Najib Al-Kilani was married in 1960 othe Islamic writer, Karima Shaheen, sister of the Egyptian radio writer Nafisa Shaheen. They had three sons.

== Al-Kilani and the media ==
His latest novel creations are The Queen of Grapes, The Confessions of Abdul Mutjalli, and The Tale of Jadallah; before his death, he left thirty ideas for thirty Islamic novels and wrote them down in a small diary about the problems of the Muslim community. In the days of his departure, he created the play "My Love Sarajevo," which readers and critics ignored. No writer or critic has mentioned it yet. It deals with the tragic situation in Bosnia and Herzegovina and offers hope through the message of evangelization and purification carried by Islamic art.

Many of his fictional works turned into works of art, as the movie Night and Rods for his novel "The Night of the Slaves" won the first prize at the Tashkent Film Festival in 1964. The book "The Promised Night" was turned into a radio and television series, a joint Egyptian-Libyan production presented in the month of Ramadan under the name (The Ruby of the Epic of Love and Peace). 1973. The novel "Those Who Burn" was also turned into an Egyptian television series "Those who burn" in 1977.

Many of his works have been translated into English, French, Turkish, Russian, Urdu, Persian, Chinese, Indonesian, Italian, and Swedish.

== Studies about him ==
- Islamic Realism in the Novels of Najib Al-Kilani, written by: Helmy Muhammad Al-Qaoud.
- Textual coherence in the novel The Immortal Call by Najeeb Al-Kilani, written by: Aida Al-Omari

== Death ==
He died at 63 on Shawwal 2, 1415 AH, corresponding to March 7, 1995.
