= No'man Ashour =

Egyptian poet and playwright

No'man Ashour (January 1918 – 5 April 1987) was an Egyptian poet and playwright, born in Mit Ghamr, Dakahlia Governorate. He is most known for the foundation of realism in the Egyptian drama. Moreover he considered comedy as the best medium to reflect reality, even if it is painful and serious.

== Plays ==
List of plays that Ashour wrote:

- The Magnet – 1955
- Time Game – 1980
- Secret of the Universe – 1970
- The Grinding Mill
- Al-Doghri Family
- Three Nights
- Countries Afar – 1976
- People Upstairs
