= Mit Ghamr =

City in Dakahlia, Egypt

Mit Ghamr ميت غمر
- City
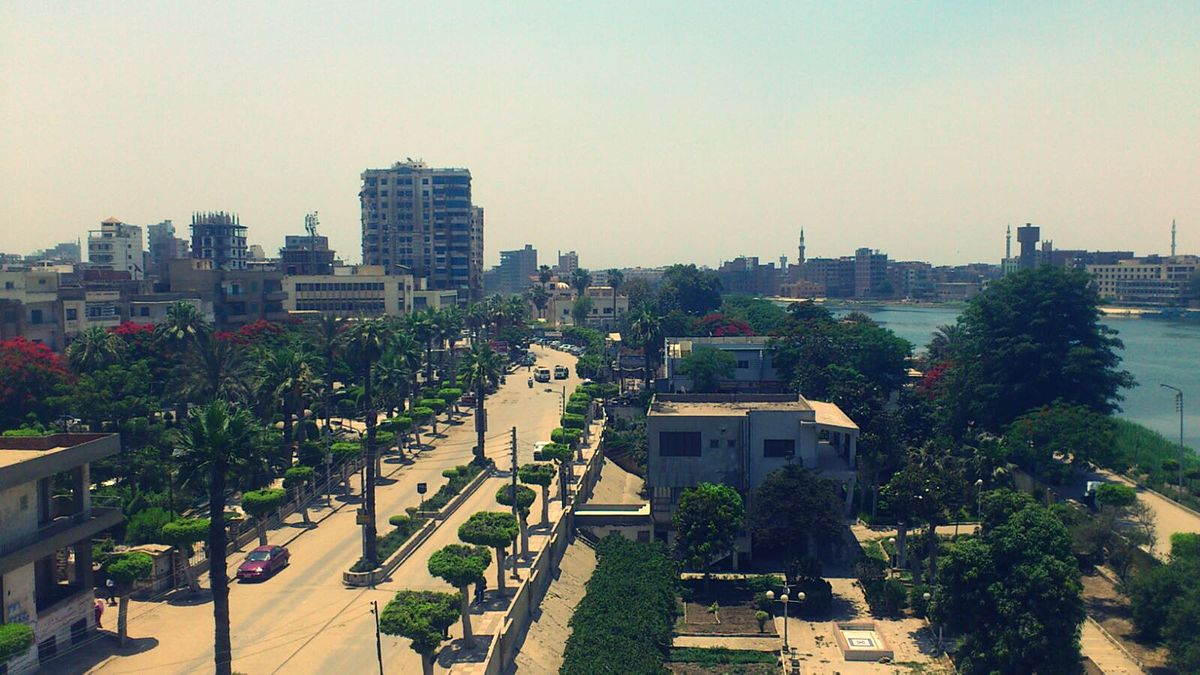
- Mit Ghamr in 2012, clearly showing the Nile branch on the eastern side.

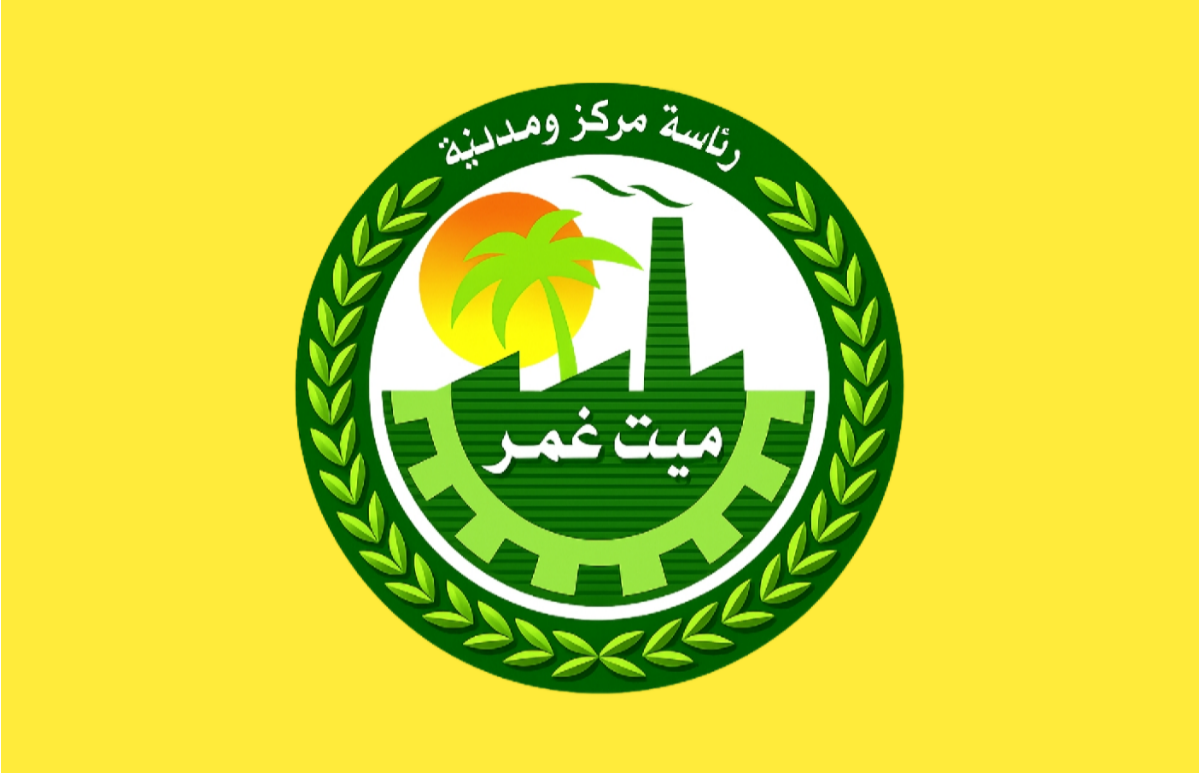
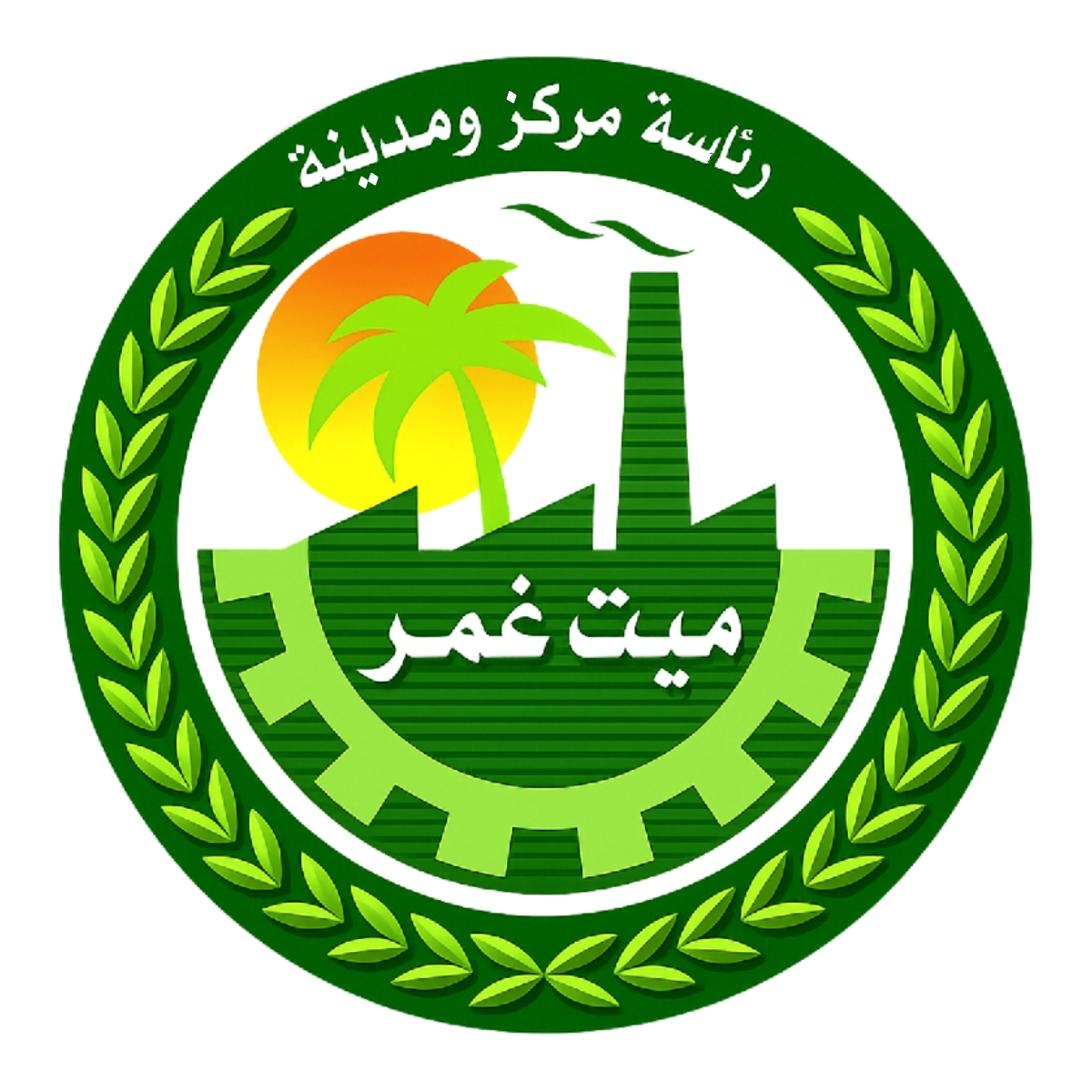
- Flag Seal
- Nickname: The Bride of Dakahlia
- The Nile Delta

- Location in Egypt
- Coordinates: 30°43′N 31°15′E
- Country: Egypt
- Governorate: Dakahlia

Area
  - Total: 5.14 sq mi (13.31 km^{2})
- Elevation: 62 ft (19 m)

Population (2021)
  - Total: 153,754
  - Density: 29,920/sq mi (11,550/km^{2})
- Time zone: UTC+2 (EET)
  - Summer (DST): UTC+3 (EEST)
- Postal code: 35611

Mit Ghamr (Egyptian Arabic: ميت غمر, IPA: [ˈmiːt ˈɣɑmɾ]) is a city in Dakahlia Governorate, Egypt. It is located on the banks of the Damietta branch, an eastern distributary of the Nile Delta. It is a major center for the aluminium industry, accounting for more than 70% of Egypt's total production, especially aluminium utensils. Mit Ghamr is the second largest city in Dakahlia Governorate, near to the city of Mansoura.

The city is historically important as a center of Sufism during the Mamluk era. The city was destroyed three times by fires, the most severe of which occurred in 1902, and each time it was rebuilt. In the modern era it was settled by foreign communities, with a number of notable acts of resistance to the French and British occupations occurring in the city. Mit Ghamr is one of the Egyptian cities that declared its independence in the 1919 Egyptian revolution through what became known as the Sultanate of Mit Ghamr. It is also known as the birthplace of the first savings bank in the Middle East and the first modern Islamic bank in the world.

== Etymology ==
Mit Ghamr was historically known as "Minyat Ghamr" (Arabic: منية غمر), but over time, the name evolved into its current form, The word "Minyat" has an Arabic origin meaning "an elegant house surrounded by gardens." Some researchers believe that "Mit" comes from a Coptic word of ancient Egyptian origin meaning "road" or another word meaning "place." However, researchers favor the Arabic origin of the word, given the widespread use of "Minyat" in the names of Egyptian villages and cities during the Islamic era. A number of ancient historians, such as Yaqut al-Hamawi in his Dictionary of Countries, referred to many places in Egypt that bore the name "Minyat" which supports this interpretation, The word "Ghamr" means submersion or flood Because of the city's proximity to the eastern branch of the Nile River, it was submerged several times before the construction of the High Dam. Therefore, the city's name in Coptic theory means "flooded place.", and In Arabic it means "the elegant house submerged in water."

== History ==
=== Foundation and Origin ===
Some historians believe that the foundation of Mit Ghamr—historically known as Minyat Ghamr—dates back to the Fatimid period (10th–12th centuries CE). During that era, large tracts of land in the eastern Nile Delta, particularly in the region known as al-Ḥūf al-Sharqī (the Eastern District), were granted to Arab tribes to secure their allegiance and ensure stability near the Damietta branch of the Nile. Among the many Arab settlements established in this region was Minyat Ghamr, which emerged as one of the larger Bedouin villages along the eastern bank of the Nile, directly across from the present-day city of Zefta. Historical sources such as al-Maqrīzī and al-Qalqashandī mention the presence of Arab tribes—particularly Banu Lakhm and Banu Judham—in the area, Among them are the Banu Shawar, who are attributed to the well-known Fatimid minister, Shawar.

In 564 AH/1168 AD, the city of Mit Ghamr was subjected to a Crusader attack during the reign of Caliph al-Adid li-Din Allah. The attack was led by King Amalric I after Shawar burned Fustat. The Crusaders headed to Mit Ghamr with a fleet of twenty galleys, and the attack resulted in killing, capture, and enslavement.

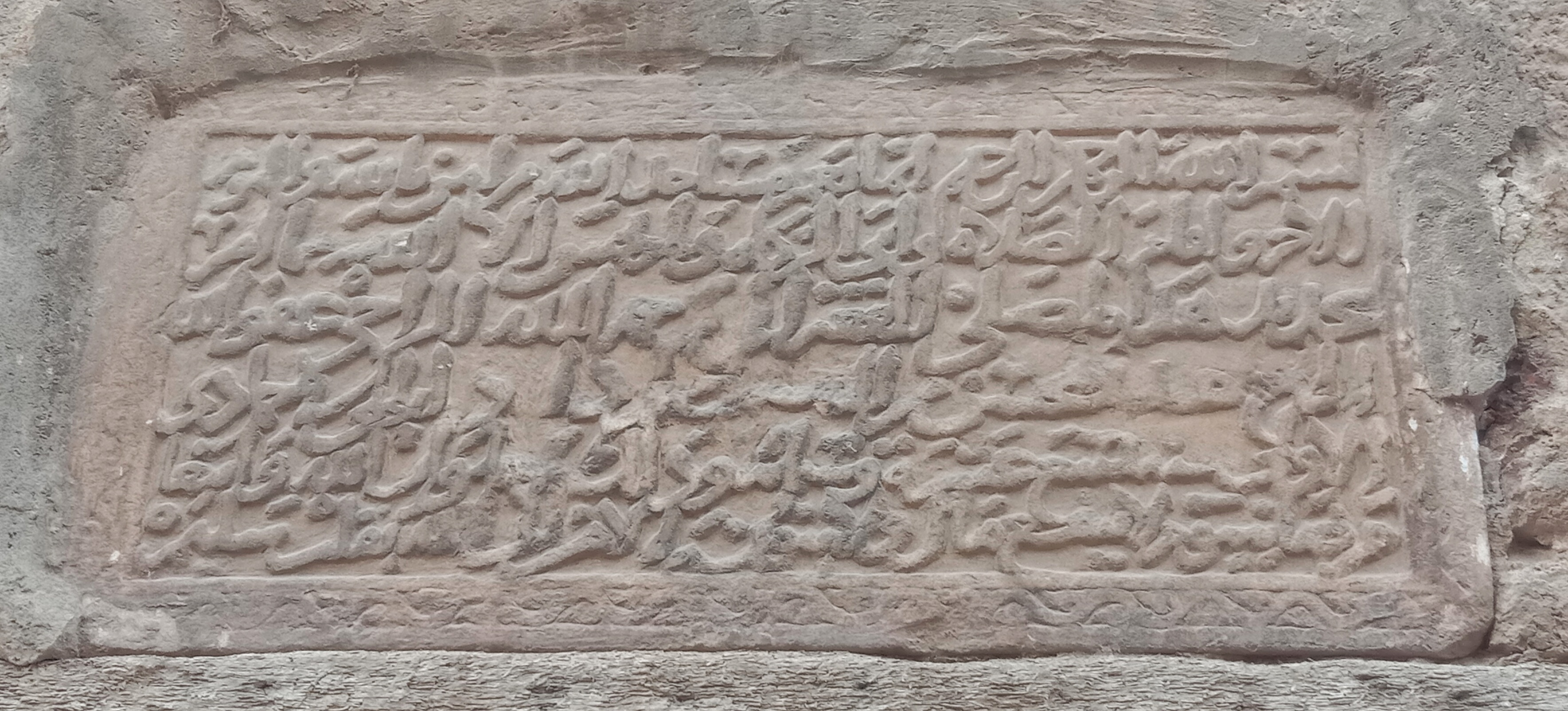
Ayyubid foundation inscription dated 619 AH / 1222 AD on the minaret of Sheikh al-Ghamri in Mit Ghamr. It records the renewal of a now-lost prayer hall.

Later, during the Ayyubid period, waves of migration continued due to the Crusades. Tribes from the Eastern Delta and the ancient port of al-Farama (Pelusium) moved inland, founding new villages named after their clans, many of which were prefixed with the term Minyat. In this context, Minyat Ghamr grew in prominence and eventually evolved into the modern city known today as Mit Ghamr. Nevertheless, despite the well-documented settlement of Arab tribes in the region, some historians argue that the city may have much older roots, although determining its exact date is extremely difficult, as is the case with most cities in the Nile Delta.

=== The Mamluk era ===
During the Mamluk era, Mit Ghamr was administratively affiliated to the Eastern Province, and enjoyed a prominent position among the Mamluk princes, as they were granted fiefdoms there. During the reign of Sultan Barquq, Mit Ghamr became the headquarters of the Kashif of Lower Egypt, who ruled all of Lower Egypt except for Al-Buhayra, where it was the headquarters of the Sultan's deputy. In 857 AH/1453 CE, Mit Ghamr was subjected to widespread looting by Bedouin tribes, leading to its destruction and the displacement of a large number of its inhabitants. The residents sought refuge with Zayn al-Din al-Ustadar, complaining of their plight. He ordered them to appear before the Sultan to present their grievances. However, al-Ustadar soon suffered a similar misfortune, and the city's inhabitants continued to face hardship. After a period, the residents returned to their city after entrusting their affairs to Baqr ibn Rashid, the sheikh of the Sharqiya Bedouin tribes. He then organized the sale of their belongings and the items looted from their shops. in 863 AH / 1458 AD Sultan Sayf al-Din Inal, who ordered the dispatch of a Mamluk military force to maintain security and restore stability. the city was a center for Sufi scholars and religious figures, attracting disciples from across Egypt. Several historical shrines remain, such as the Shrine of Sidi Muhammad al-Wa’iz, Sidi Khalaf, and Arbaeen, dating back to the 15th century. Some of the mosques belonging to it still exist, such as the Sheikh Qasim Mosque (Sidi Qasim) and others. The Mamluk Sultan Qaitbay attempted to meet Abu al-Abbas al-Ghamri, one of the city's renowned Sufi figures, but was unsuccessful, so he later sent his son to visit him.

=== The Ottoman era ===
At the beginning of Ottoman rule in Egypt, The city suffered a devastating fire during the reign of Hayır Bey, when Abd al-Dayem ibn Baqr, one of the Bedouin sheikhs of Sharqia, set it ablaze during his rebellion against the Ottoman authorities in 924 AH/1518 CE. This was the first major destruction the city had endured. The military force dispatched by Khayr Bey managed to expel Abd al-Dayim from his stronghold in Mit Ghamr. In 1523 CE, a high-ranking envoy arrived in Mit Ghamr from Istanbul to install Ahmad ibn Baqr, Abd al-Dayim's father, as the sheikh of the Bedouin. Sheikh Ahmad received the envoy with great pomp and ceremony, presenting him with all the taxes collected in Sharqia.

In 1524, Ahmed Pasha, the governor of Egypt, known as "Hain Ahmed Pasha," declared his rebellion against the Ottoman Empire, proclaiming his independence and appointing himself Sultan of Egypt after capturing the Cairo Citadel. However, Prince Janem al-Hamzawi managed to rally the people and assemble a surprise force, attacking Ahmed Pasha's troops while he was at the bathhouse. During the ensuing clash, Ahmed Pasha fled to Mit Ghamr and sought refuge with Ibn Baqr, but the latter abandoned him, leaving Janem al-Hamzawi and the Ottoman army to pursue him. A decisive battle erupted in Mit Ghamr, ending with the Ottoman army's capture and pillaging of the city. Ahmed Pasha was captured and beheaded. His head was then sent to Cairo and displayed at Bab Zuweila before being sent to the Sultan in Istanbul.

The administrative status of the city changed during the Ottoman era, as Mit Ghamr was annexed to the Dakahlia Governorate according to the Ottoman quadrature carried out by the Ottoman governor Hadım Suleiman Pasha during the reign of Sultan Suleiman the Magnificent. The Turkish traveler Evliya Çelebi noted that during his visit, Mit Ghamr contained 4,000 houses, 9 grand mosques, 35 mosques, 7 schools, 12 offices, 7 caravanserais, and 600 shops.

In the Ottoman era, Mit Ghamr thrived as a key trade hub due to its strategic location along the Nile River trade routes, Mit Ghamr was also distinguished by its flourishing blacksmithing industry, with an integrated industrial complex comprising markets, workshops, and an administrative system overseen by the "Qisaira." This industry had a clear and integrated infrastructure, demonstrating the advancement of the city's traditional crafts. The city also featured a prominent goldsmiths' quarter, which specialized in crafting and selling gold and silver jewelry and still exists today. It is noteworthy that the dhimmis (non-Muslims) monopolized this profession at the time.

==== Resistance during the French Campaign in Egypt ====
===== Revolt of the Amir al-Hajj (March 1799) =====
During Napoleon Bonaparte's invasion of Egypt, Mit Ghamr played a pivotal role in resisting the French occupation by cutting off supply routes along the Nile River. This act of defiance angered the French and marked the beginning of a revolt led by Mustafa Bey the Kethüda of Bakr Pasha, the Governor of Egypt, who was also appointed then by Napoleon himself as the Amir al-Hajj of Egypt Instead of Saleh Bey, who died of grief when he heard the news of the occupation.

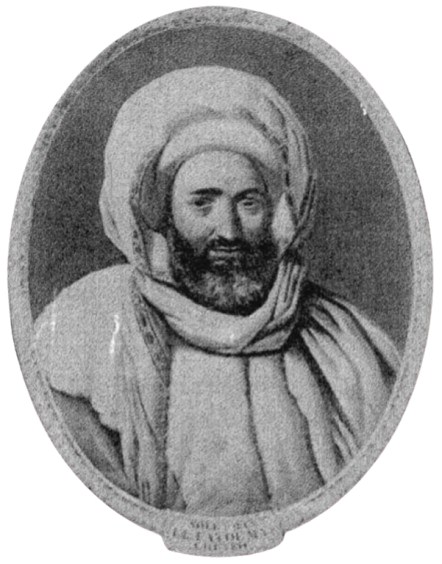
Sheikh Suleiman Al-Fayoumi

Taking advantage of Napoleon's departure from Egypt in early 1799 to Syria, especially after receiving news from Jazzar Pasha and his former superior Bakr Pasha that Sultan Selim III had sent an army to Egypt to expel the French. Mustafa Bey launched a revolution on March 25, 1799, making Mit Ghamr the center of his operations. The revolution was joined by Sheikh Suleiman al-Fayoumi, an Al-Azhar scholar and one of its main advocates, whose influence and popularity among Egyptians were among the main factors that encouraged people to join the revolt, along with Ibrahim Effendi, the Great Qadi of Egypt. Their participation gave the movement religious and legal legitimacy. As French forces and 7 ships left Cairo to support Napoleon's military power in Levant campaign, Mustafa Bey gathered followers from northern Egypt. Several rebellious Bedouin and Mamluks tribes also joined his cause, motivated by his religious influence and his official role in the Ottoman administration.

The rebel forces were estimated to be in the thousands. The beginning of the revolution was crowned with success because the revolutionaries were able to capture 6 ships, kill those on board, and seize their weapons, while the remaining ship escaped to Cairo and was merely a guard ship. Although the French eventually suppressed the revolt after they clashed with the revolutionaries and Mustafa Bey fled to Palestine, the people of Mit Ghamr rose up again. Supported this time by surviving Mamluk factions, they attacked a large French warship loaded with weapons and cannons, capturing and killing the French soldiers on board.

The importance of this revolution lies in its being the first major popular movement after the state of stagnation and despair that had afflicted the Egyptians, and the relative calm that prevailed in Cairo following the suppression of the Revolt of Cairo. It restored hope in the possibility of resisting the occupation, and contributed to distracting the French forces from the siege of Acre, which had an impact on Napoleon's failure there.

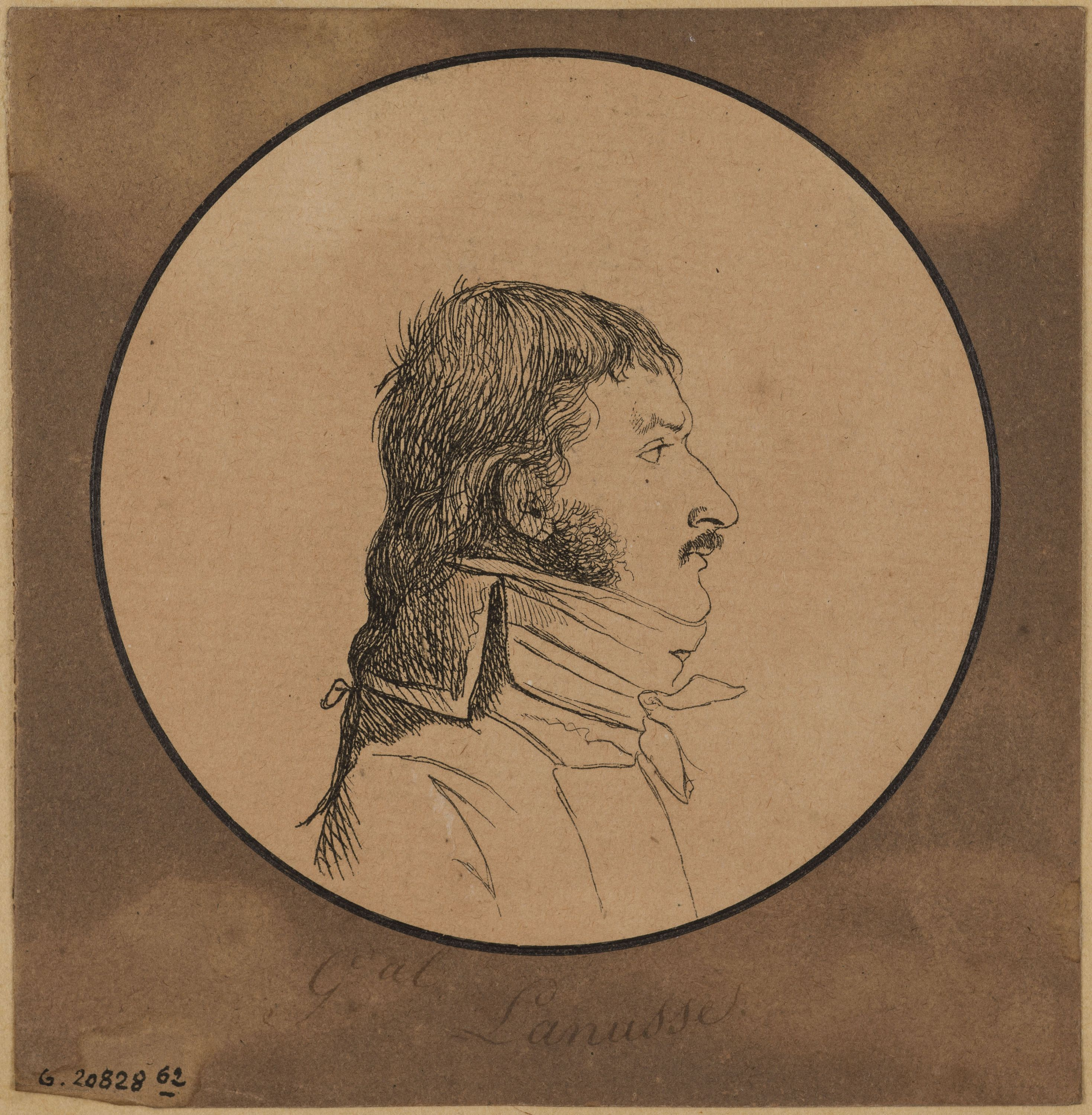
Général François Lanusse

The revolution in Mit Ghamr was renewed once again. On May 30, the locals, in alliance with the Mamluks, attacked a French warship coming from Samannud, seizing it and its weapons, including four cannons, and killing those on board. Navigation on the Nile was disrupted. The French army decided to resort to methods of repression and violence to impose security and stability in Mit Ghamr. In retaliation for the ship seizure, they marched on Mit Ghamr under the command of General François Lanusse. The French general ordered Mit Ghamr to be burned and destroyed, leaving "not a stone upon a stone." His forces then entered the city to spread panic and fear in order to suppress the local population. After returning from his campaign in the Levant, Napoleon Bonaparte decided to issue orders to reinforce the French forces in Mit Ghamr. Permanent military garrisons were established, in addition to an order to build a large fortress on the Nile bank to maintain control over the Nile Delta. The background to these decisions is revealed in a letter Napoleon wrote to General Reyniér on July 3, saying: "I am building a fortress in Mit Ghamr, O common citizen; It will have the advantage of containing this city, which is today the center of one of the states, and protecting navigation on the Nile, because our ships were always under attack in Mit Ghamr.”

=== The Muhammad Ali dynasty era ===
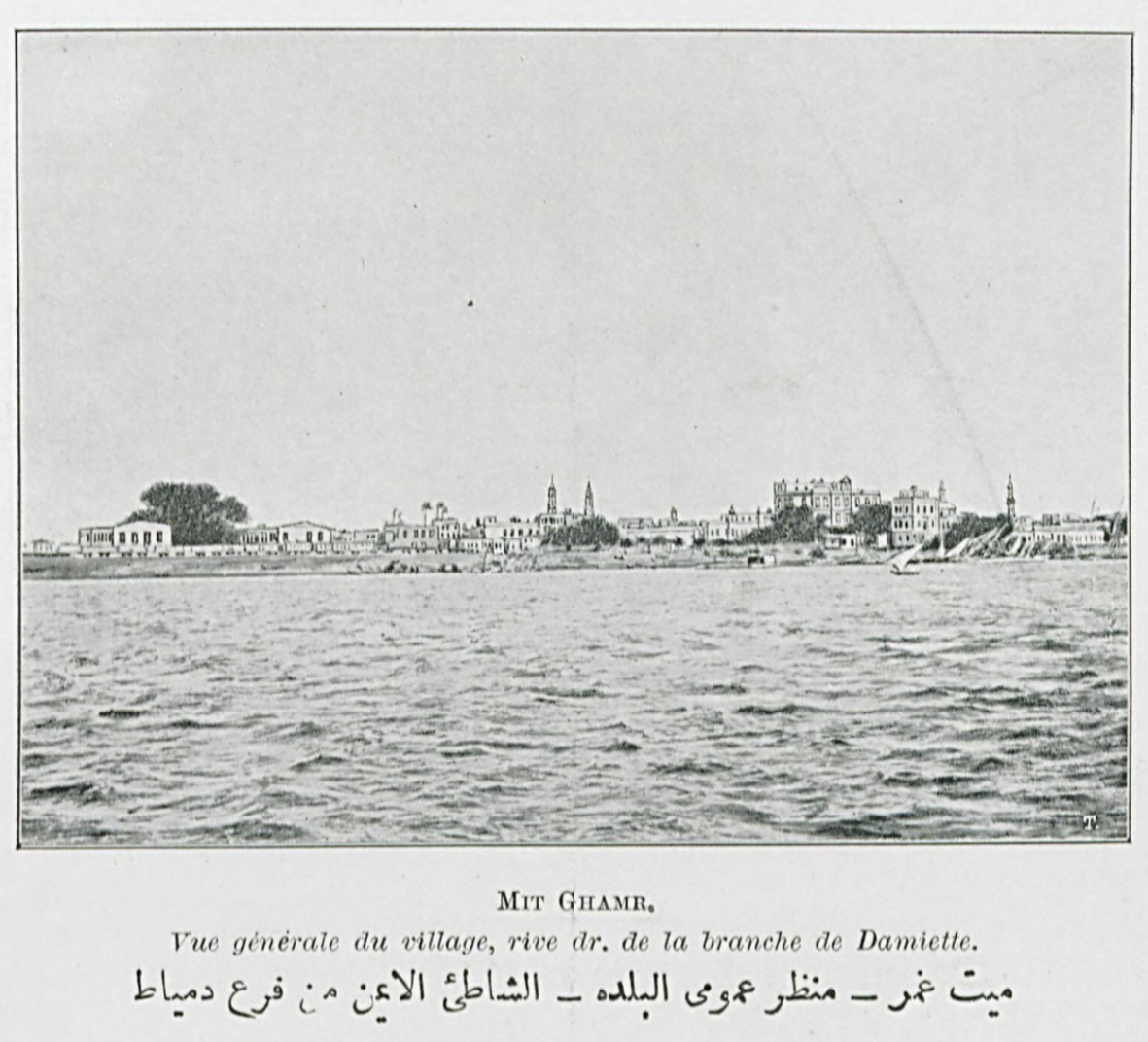
General view of Mit Ghamr on the Nile in 1902

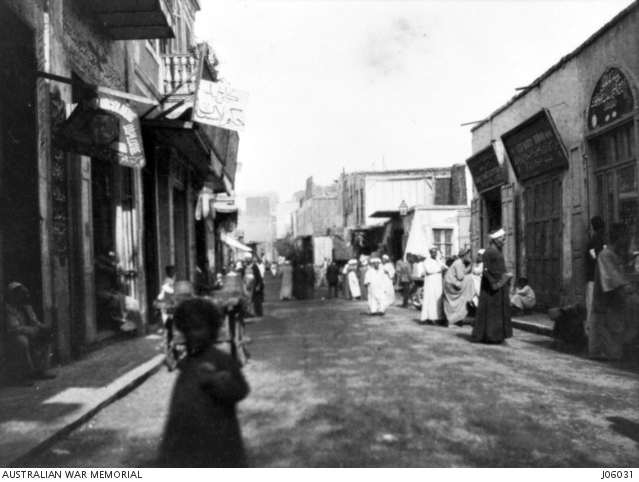
One of the streets of Mit Ghamr in 1919

Mit Ghamr witnessed an industrial and educational renaissance during the reign of Muhammad Ali. A cotton spinning factory was established there, with 75 wheels and 50 cotton gins. It was part of a network of factories established in Lower Egypt to support the spinning and weaving industry. An indigo factory was also established in the city, which was used locally, and the surplus was sent to Cairo to be sold in foreign markets. These factories contributed to stimulating the local economy and strengthening the city's industrial role, which continues to the present day. An elementary school was established there in 1837, teaching French, Arabic, and Turkish, along with mathematics, history, and other subjects. Muhammad Ali hired a number of Al-Azhar scholars to oversee its affairs, but the school was closed in 1846 after the Egyptian-Ottoman War. Mit Ghamr became the base for an administrative section in the Dakahlia Governorate in 1826 AD. The section was named Markaz Mit Ghamr (Mit Ghamr district) in 1871 AD during the reign of Ismail Pasha.

==== Cosmopolitan Character in the 19th and 20th Centuries ====
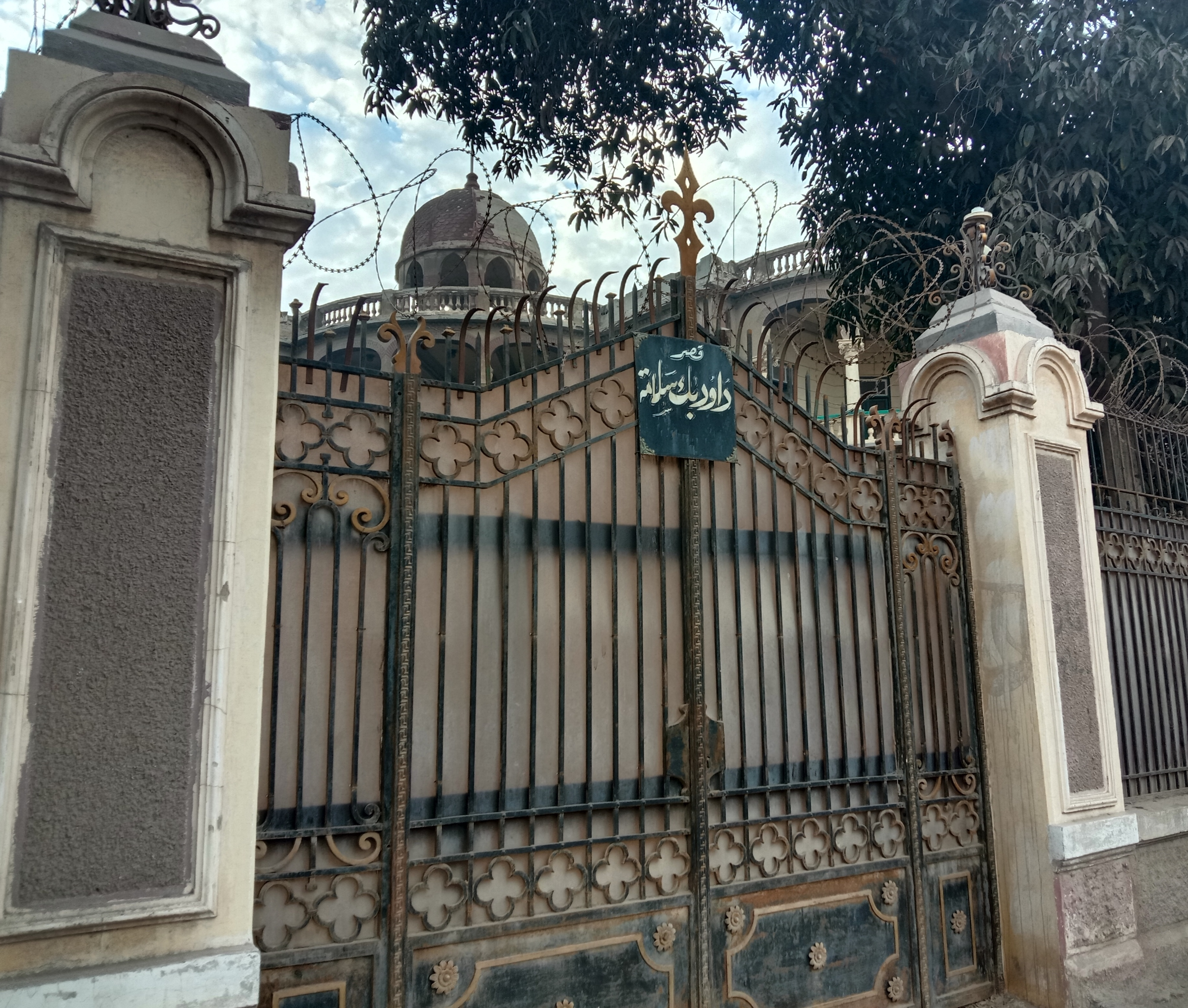
A picture of one of the gates of Dawoud bey Salama (French man) Palace in Mit Ghamr

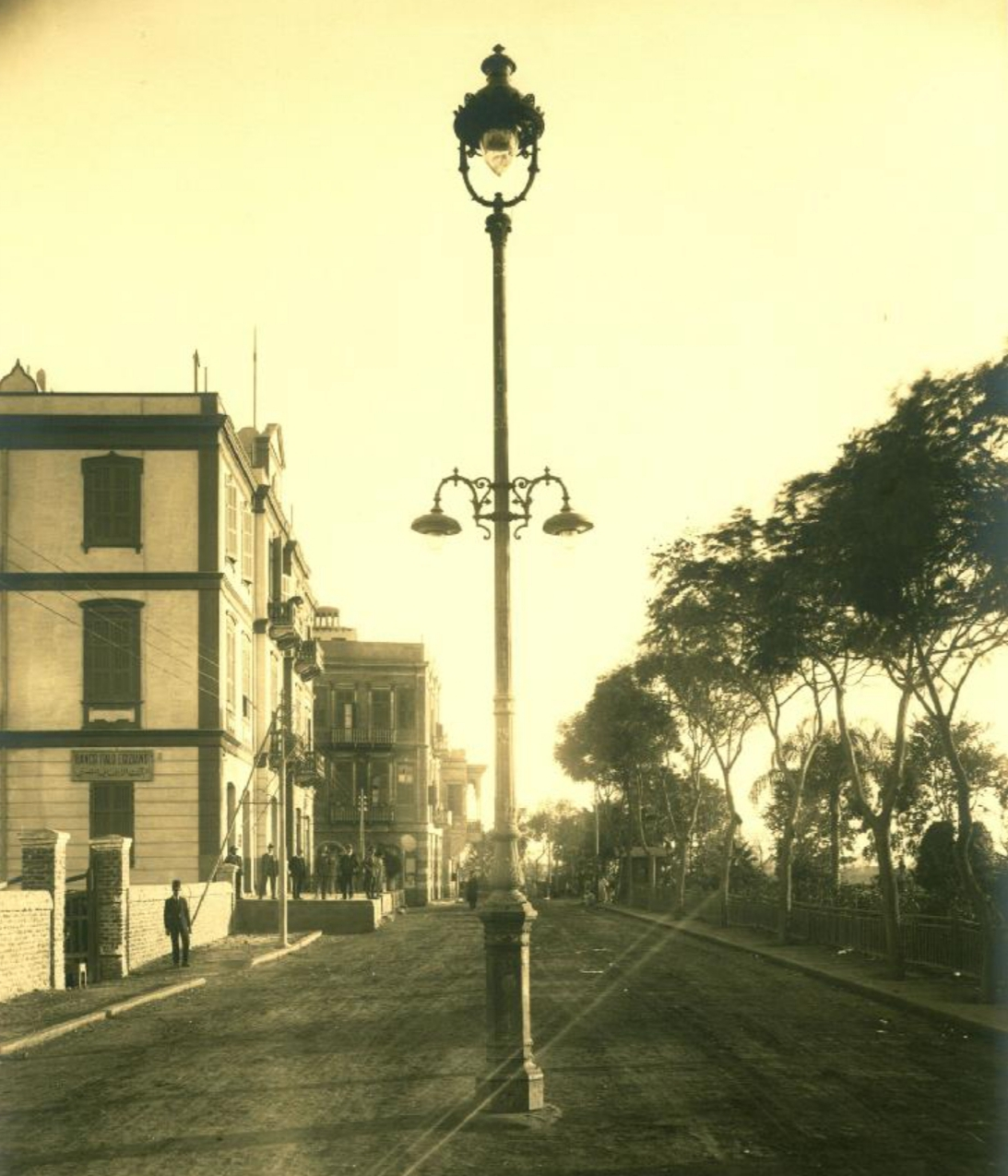
Al-Hurriya Street in Mit Ghamr in the 1920s. The house of the Greek Khawaja Yeni Baban appears on the left side.

By the 19th and early 20th centuries, during the rule of the Muhammad Ali dynasty, Mit Ghamr became home to a large foreign community, including Greeks, Italians, Armenians and French residents. At its peak in the late 19th century, the foreign population exceeded 200 individuals, which was significant for a provincial Egyptian city. According to the 1902 census, the number of foreigners residing in the city jumped to 359 individuals, and these numbers continued to increase rapidly. In the late 19th and early 20th centuries, the city witnessed significant economic and cultural activity and infrastructure development due to the foreign communities residing there. They played a significant role in the city's development. In 1891, the Lyon African Mission, affiliated with the French Freres Group, established a school in the city. In 1923, the French Tourel family established the United Ginning and Oil Factories Company, headquartered in Mit Ghamr, with another branch in Alexandria. The Greek community also emerged through the establishment of its own association, in addition to owning schools, including the Greek Primary School and the Association School. They also established the Kh. Mikhail Printing Press in 1932, along with other foreign establishments. The Edinburgh Medical Missionary Society with Frederick Oakley Lasbrey founded a medical mission in Mit Ghamr in 1928. Many European-style villas and mansions remain from this period, such as the Babban Mansion (formerly an Italian bank) and the Imbroir Mansion.

==== The Great Fire of Mit Ghamr (1902) ====
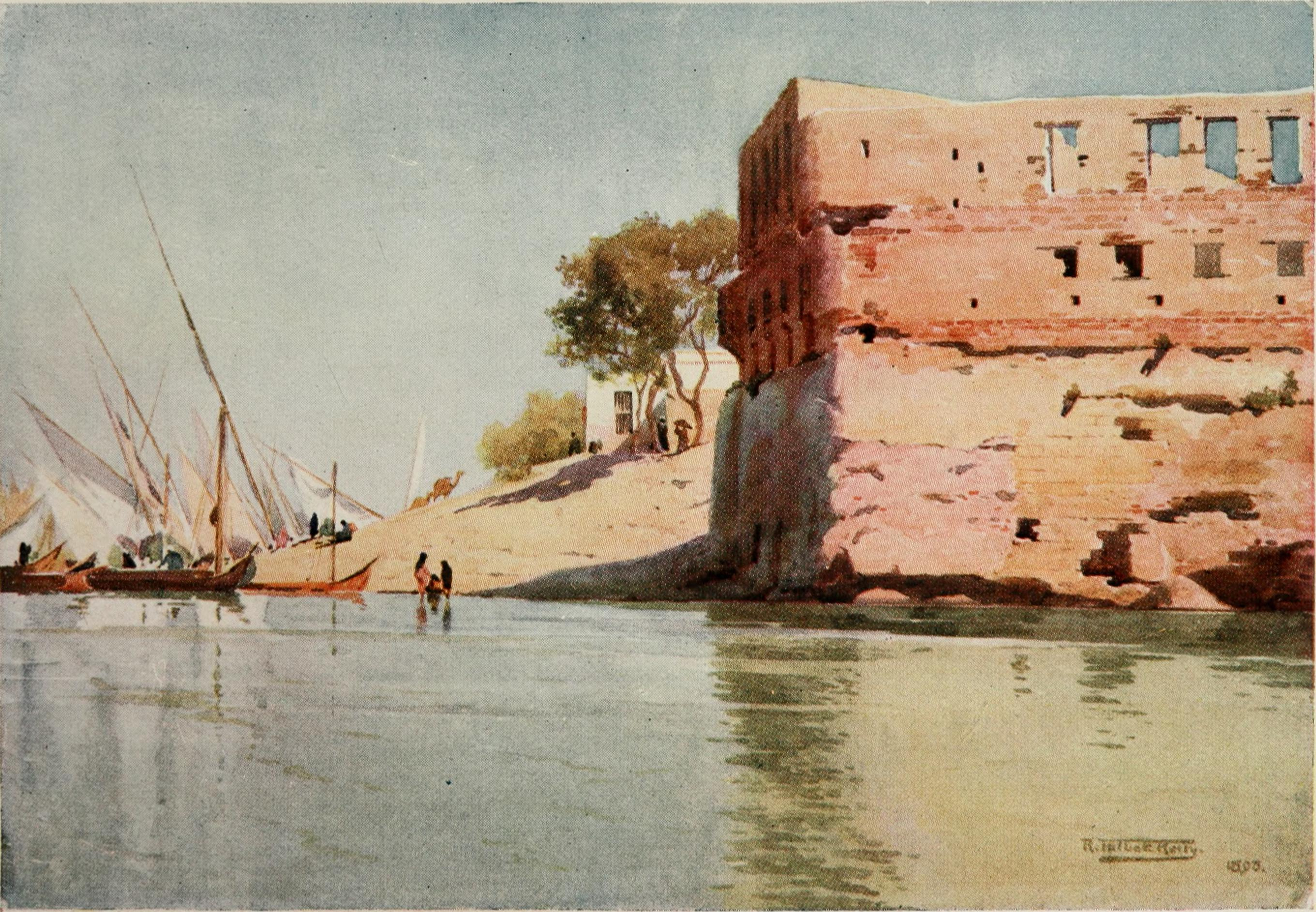
A Ruined Palace at Mit Gamr, by Robert Talbot Kelly

In 1902, a huge fire broke out in Mit Ghamr that lasted 12 days and spread to the surrounding villages. As a result of this fire, more than 5,000 people were killed or injured. This prompted many celebrities in Egypt to appeal for donations to rebuild the city and help its people. Among the most prominent of these was the writer Mustafa Lutfi Al-Manfaluti and Imam Muhammad Abduh, who said of the fire: “The accident is not a minor one; the number of injured is five thousand and a few hundred, including children who lost their families, and merchants and craftsmen whose machines and capital were destroyed, and it is impossible for them to start life again except with the help of their brothers, otherwise they will become vagrants, voyeurists, or beggars.”, after donations were collected from all over Egypt, the city was rebuilt after being on the verge of extinction. This incident became the subject of poems of mourning by Egyptian poets such as Ahmed Shawqi, Hafez Ibrahim and others.

==== Resistance to British Occupation and Declaration of Independence ====
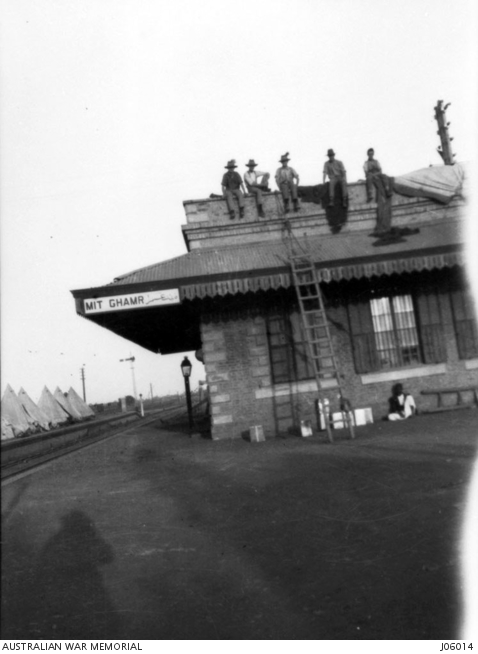
The railway station at Mit Ghamr, Egypt, showing Australian soldiers with a Lewis gun on the roof.

Like many other Egyptian cities, Mit Ghamr expressed strong hostility toward British rule during the occupation period (1882–1956). The city witnessed several incidents of resistance, particularly in relation to the railway infrastructure, which was a key component of British military logistics. At one point, General Wilson dispatched a military train to repair damaged railway lines in the area. However, local residents ambushed the train by cutting the track behind it, effectively trapping the convoy. A British rescue unit attempted to intervene, but it was repelled by fierce opposition from the Mit Ghamr Vigilance Committee, a local civilian resistance group. Subsequent clashes resulted in the deaths of 30 civilians initially, followed by 50 more in further confrontations. Despite reinforcement deployments, which led to an additional 10 casualties, Wilson admitted that Mit Ghamr remained outside effective British control for a period, and attacks on railway lines persisted.

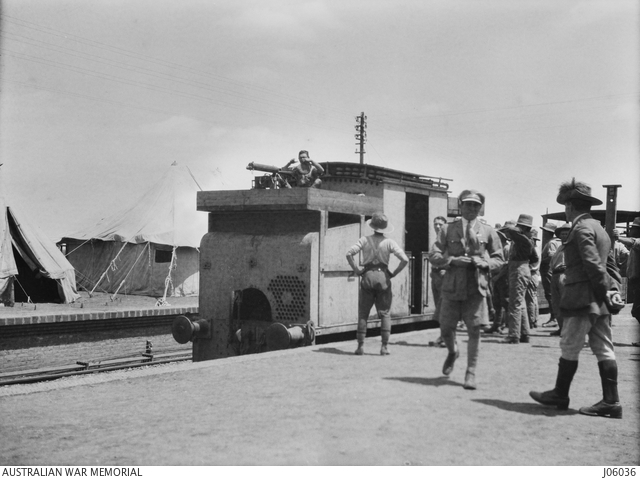
An armoured train at Mit Ghamr railway station during the Egyptian Revolution.

During the 1919 Egyptian revolution, Mit Ghamr witnessed strong resistance to the British occupation, which reached its peak when the city declared its independence from the Egyptian Sultanate under the name "Sultanate of Mit Ghamr," led by Sultan Ahmed Bey Abdo, one of the city's prominent notables. High school and college students who survived the arrest campaigns formed the nascent Sultanate's guard. The new government began to impose taxes to organize local affairs. During the two-week period of independence, no incidents of theft or assault were recorded. During the independence period, the city witnessed several demonstrations in which Muslims and Christians participated together, blocking railway lines and organizing joint protests. The city also housed train and vehicle repair workshops, some of which had been converted to manufacture weapons and bombs for the British during WWI. However, 500 workers there went on strike and sided with the demonstrators. After each demonstration, participants held meetings to plan the next marches, sometimes in the mosque and sometimes in the church, as a sign of inter-sectarian unity. This popular movement continued until the arrival of a British cavalry unit, with Mr. Shepheard at its head. The unit succeeded in ending independence and forbade entry into or exit from the city without authorization.

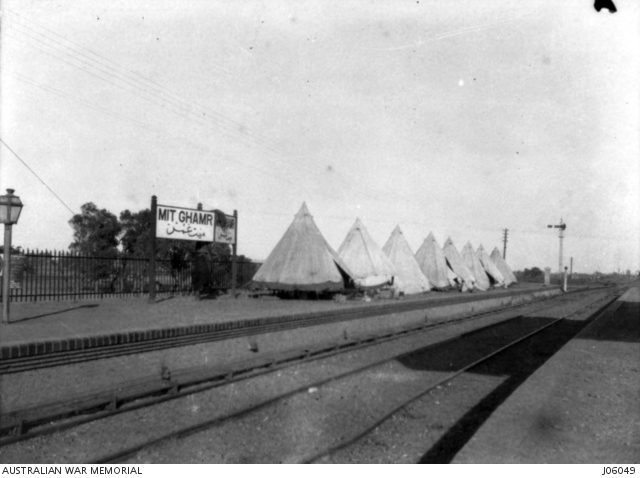
The tents of a patrol of the 15th Light Horse Regiment at Mit Ghamr railway station during the Egyptian Revolution.

Another significant episode occurred during the 1919 Egyptian Revolution, following the declaration of the Zefta Republic by nationalist leader Youssef El-Gindi. After British forces failed to seize Zefta, they withdrew to Mit Ghamr to regroup. However, the people of Mit Ghamr mounted intense resistance, compelling the British to deploy the 15th Australian Light Horse Regiment to quell the uprising and restore order. British forces also utilized armored trains to protect railway lines and secure supply routes, highlighting the strategic importance of the Delta region during the occupation.

Mit Ghamr actively participated in the national movement during the 1935 uprising against the British occupation. On November 14, the city's students held a massive demonstration to mark National Jihad Day, chanting for the downfall of England and the government and denouncing Hoare's statement. On November 21, lawyers in Mit Ghamr went on strike in solidarity with the nationwide strikes mourning the martyrs. On December 14, a massive evening demonstration, spearheaded by the doctors' and lawyers' unions, residents, merchants, and students, toured the city in protest and national outrage. Chanting was for the National Front, independence, and the 1923 Constitution.

=== The Modern era ===
The events of the 2011 Egyptian revolution in Mit Ghamr saw about 10,000 demonstrators take to the streets of the city. A number of them tried to storm a police station, but the officers and sergeants threatened to fire live bullets, and the rest of the demonstrators confronted them to prevent acts of sabotage.

In 2013, Mit Ghamr witnessed widespread protests and demonstrations against the Muslim Brotherhood in front of the group's headquarters in the city The demonstrators chanted slogans such as "The people want to bring down the regime." leading to clashes between protesters and Brotherhood members, culminating in the storming and destruction of the headquarters.

== Landmarks ==
Mit Ghamr city is home to numerous historical and cultural landmarks that reflect its rich heritage. The following are some of the most notable landmarks. It is worth noting that a significant portion of these landmarks was lost when the city was destroyed three times in its history—in 1518, 1799, and 1902—leading to the disappearance of many ancient sites.

The most famous landmarks include:

The French Bridge

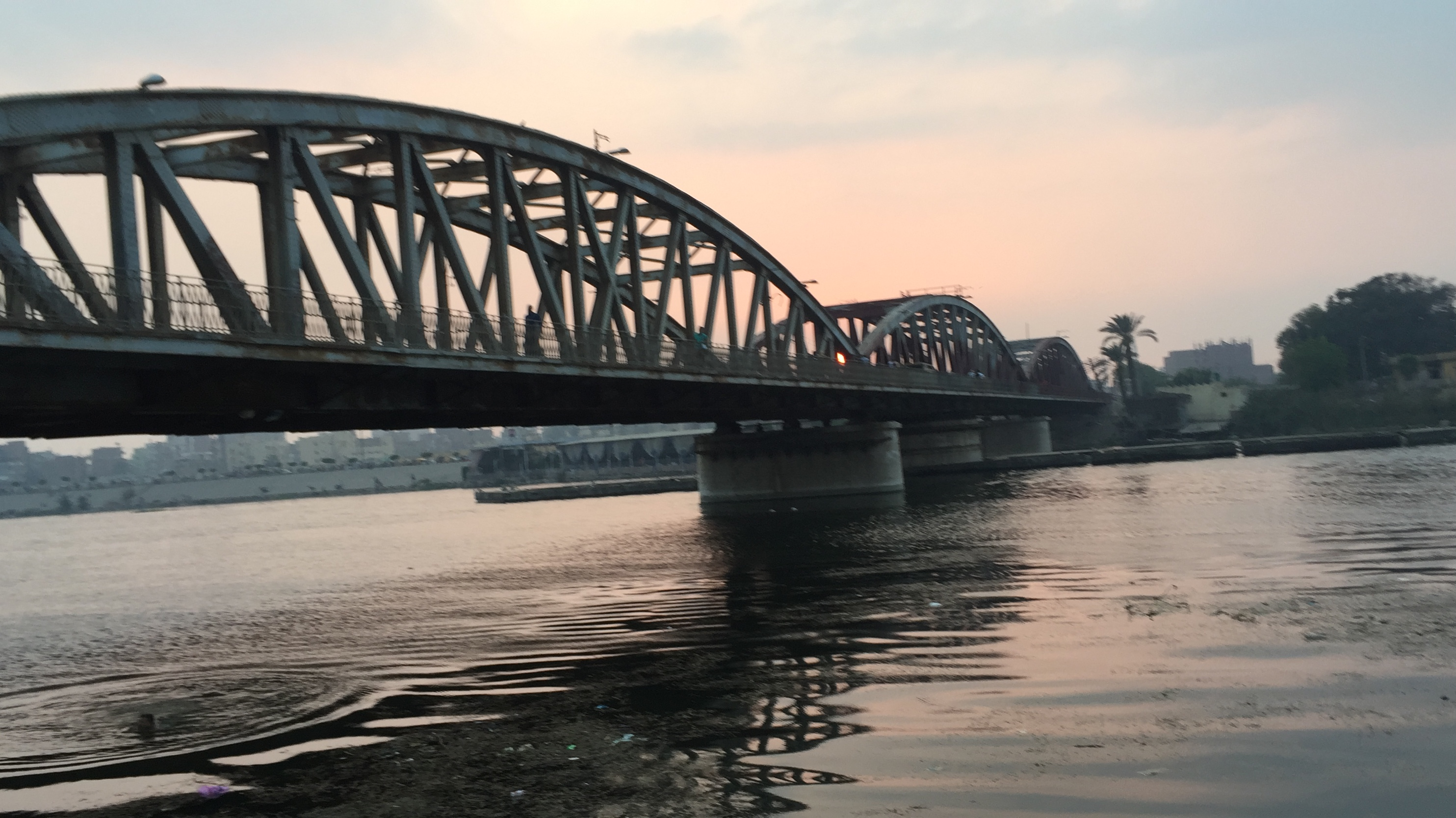
The French bridge connecting the cities of Mit Ghamr and Zefta

The French Bridge is the only structure connecting the city of Mit Ghamr to the city of Zefta in Gharbia Governorate. Made by the French company Daydé & Pillé in Paris. It was constructed in 1907 during the British occupation of Egypt due to the ease of transporting weapons and ammunition, the bridge is distinguished by the fact that it can be opened and closed for the passage of ships. The bridge was a target for Israeli aircraft during the Yom Kippur War, but it is said that the air defense unit tasked with guarding it, with the help of the popular resistance, destroyed the aircraft on the mission, and it spans approximately 417 meters. The bridge witnessed clashes between local residents and British forces during the events of the short-lived Republic of Zefta.

Dawoud Bey Salama palace

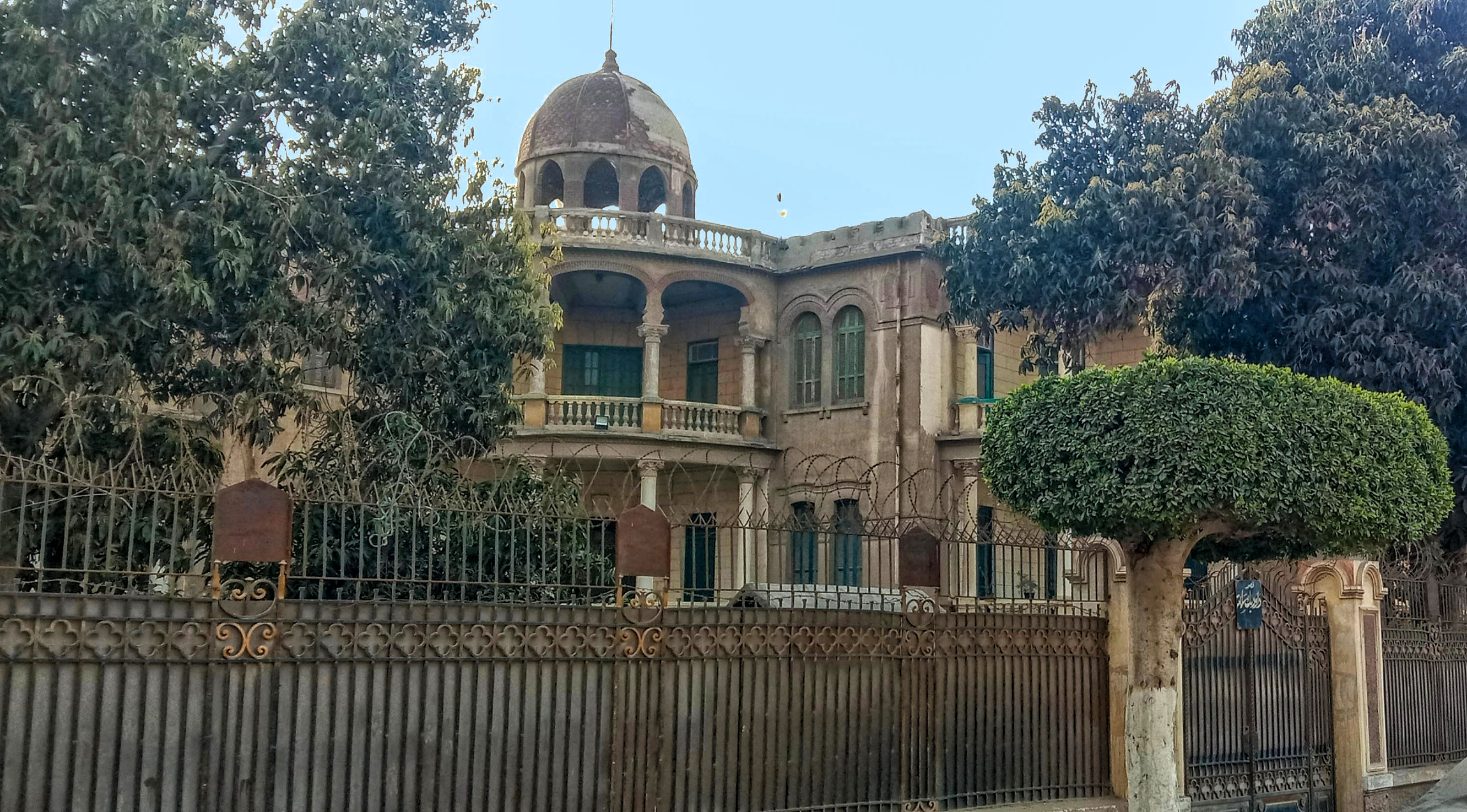
The exterior of Dawoud Bey Salama palace

It is the most famous of the city's palaces, built in 1926 for Dawoud Bey Salama, a prominent figure in Mit Ghamr of French origin. The palace was the headquarters of the National Democratic Party in the city before the 2011 Egyptian revolution. The palace consists of a basement and two main floors, in addition to an upper floor above the roof. It is surrounded by a large garden enclosed by a high wall, and is distinguished by its diverse architectural elements, combining Greek, Roman, Andalusian, Mashriqi Arabic, and Renaissance styles, making it one of the most architecturally diverse palaces in Egypt.

Emir Hammad Mosque

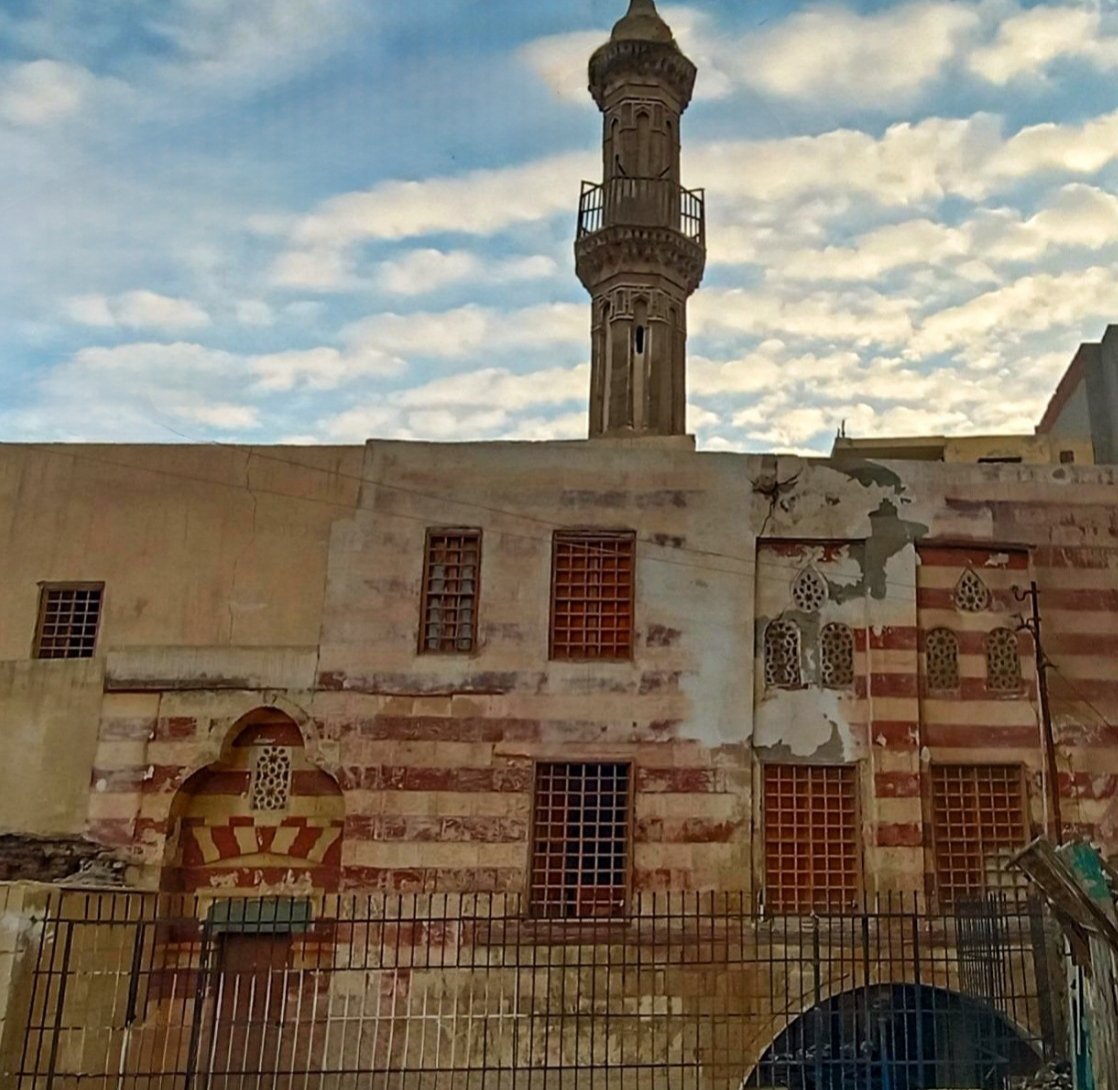
Emir Hammad Mosque

Emir Hammad mosque is considered one of the ancient Islamic monuments in Mit Ghamr, the mosque dating back to the Ottoman era, specifically the seventeenth century AD, built in 1615. It is a hanging mosque built in the style of a courtyard surrounded by four iwans. It is decorated with a two-story minaret on top of its facade and a finely crafted wooden pulpit. The mosque resembles the architectural style of Mamluk schools, although it was built in the Ottoman era.The mosque is distinguished by being the only remaining corner in the Delta and by being elevated above the ground. The mosque is rectangular, 31.65 m long and 14.50 m wide. Since it consists of iwans, the largest of which is the southeastern iwan facing the qibla and the northeastern one facing it.

The Church of the Virgin Mary

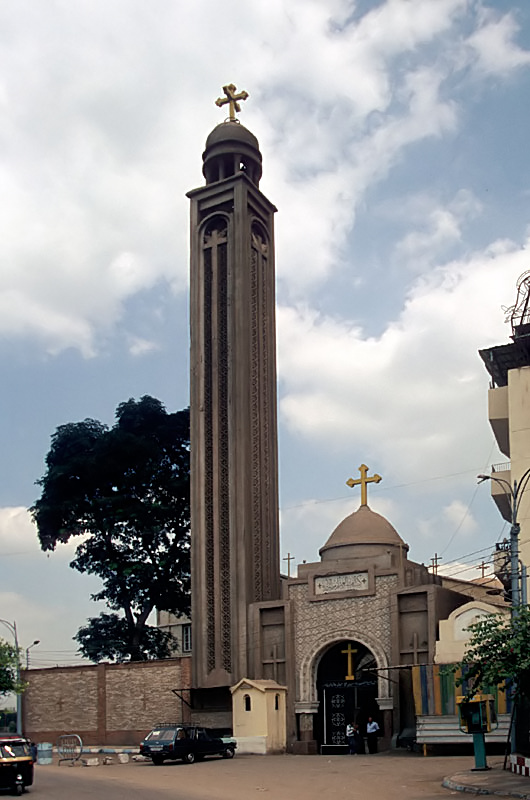
The Church of the Virgin Mary

The Church of the Virgin Mary is a church that was first built as part of a group of churches built by Empress Helena, mother of Constantine the Great, in the fourth century AD. However, this church was demolished and rebuilt several times, the last of which was in 1881 but It was built in the same style as it was when it was first built which belongs to the Byzantine style of churches, The church also contains a collection of sacred books bound in silver, crosses, and antique incense burners. There is also an antique chalice chair, which is a box made of precious local wood with holy images. It is considered one of the oldest churches in Egypt and the Middle East.

Al-Ghamry Minaret

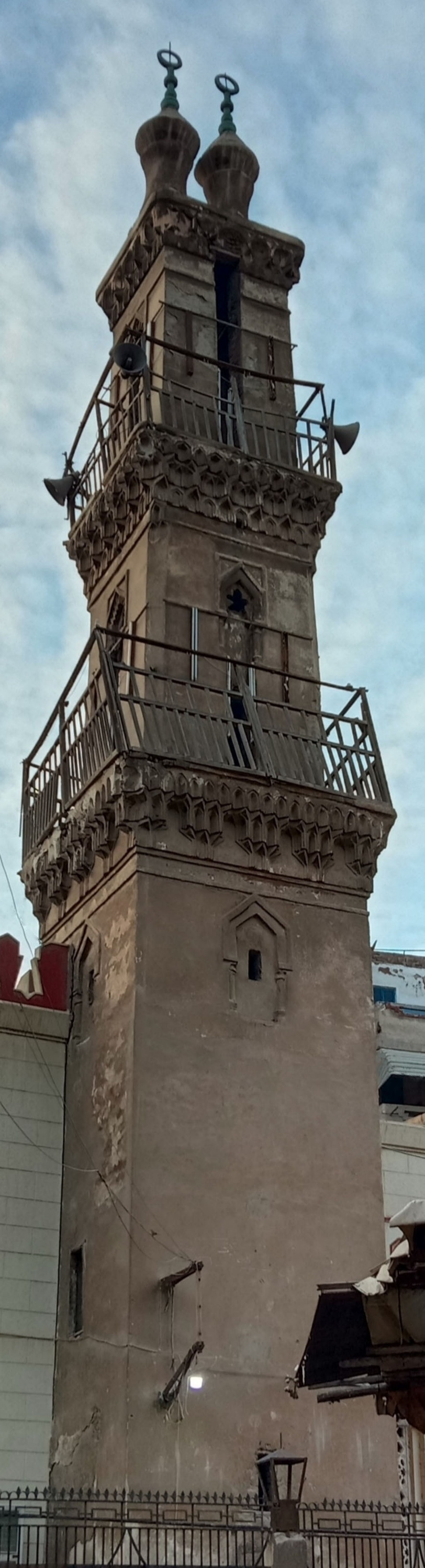
Al-Ghamry Minaret

Al-Ghamry Minaret is an ancient minaret dating back to the Mamluk era in Mit Ghamr, built in 1499. It is considered the oldest remaining example of double-headed Mamluk minarets in Egypt.It is likely that the Al-Ghamri Minaret was the first minaret built in this Mamluk style outside Cairo, but the minaret's tops fell in 1963 and the minaret remained standing without tops until it was restored.

== Geography ==
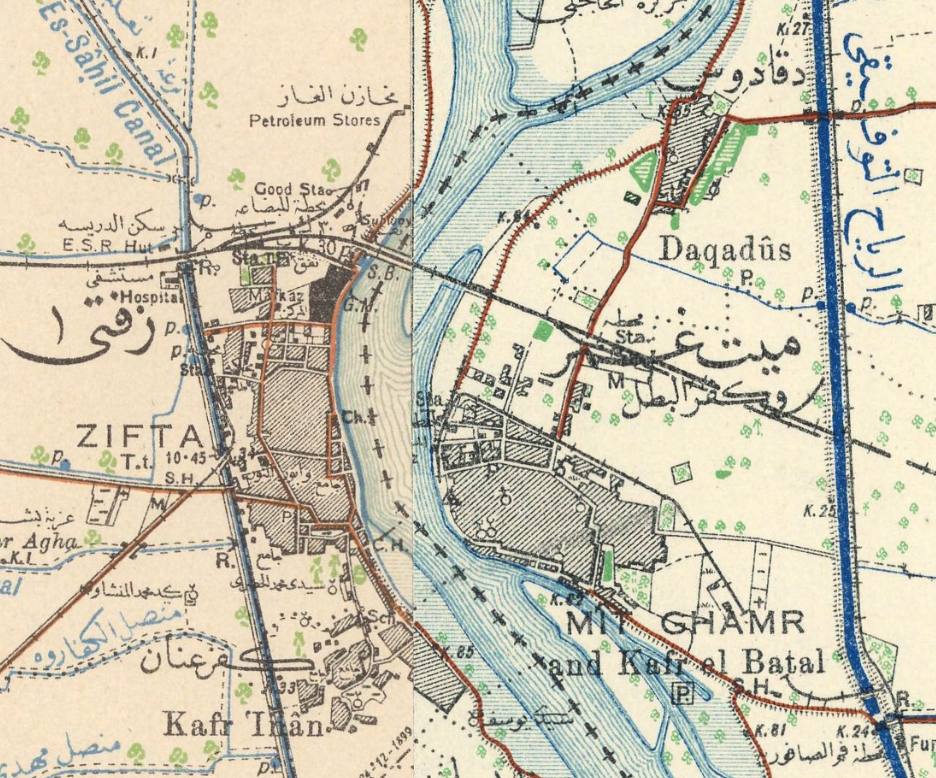
Mit Ghamr Map in 1903

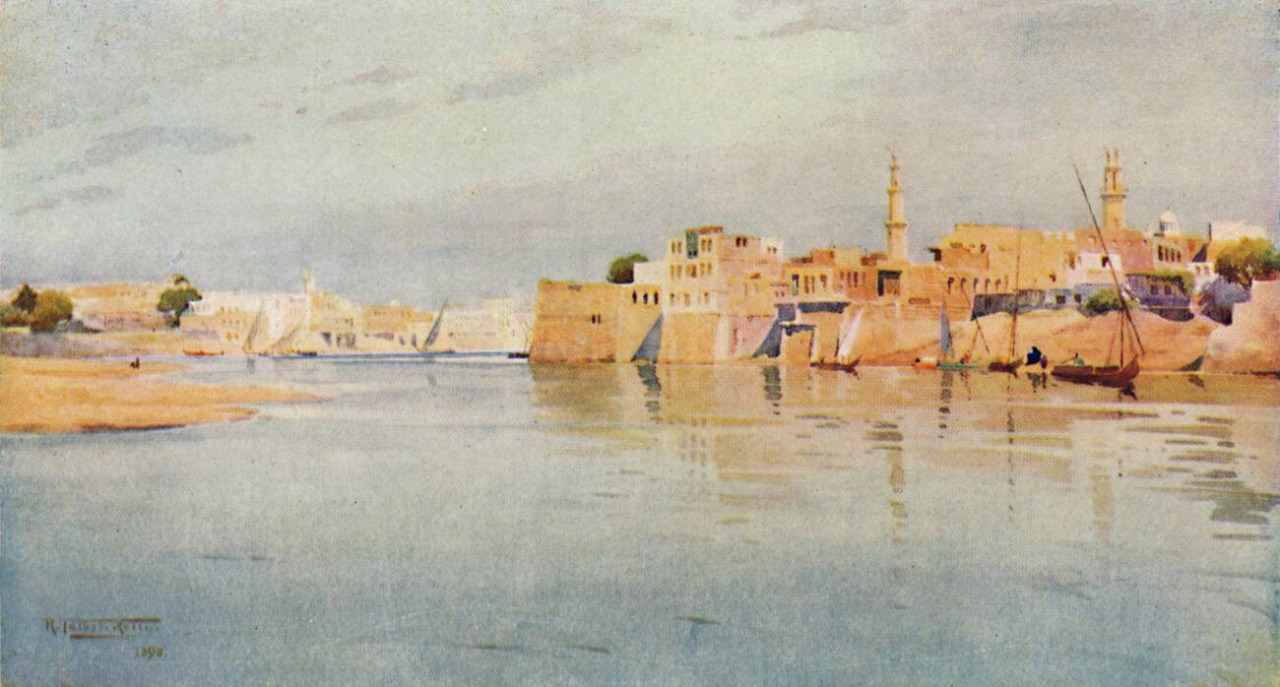
Mit Ghamr on the lower nile, by Robert Talbot Kelly

Mit Ghamr city is located on Damietta branch of the Nile, and just on the opposite side of the Nile located another city called Zifta which belongs to Gharbia Governorate. Mit Ghamr is located in the middle of four governorates, Dakahlia to the north, Al Qaliobiah to the south, Al Sharqiah to the east and Al Gharbiah to the west. It is about 43 kilometers away from Al Mansurah and 27 kilometers away from Zagazig, the capital of Sharqia, also about 35 kilometers from Banha, the capital of Qalyubia, and 29 kilometers from Tanta, the capital of Al Gharbiah.

The area of Mit Ghamr was estimated at 0.41 km^{2} in 1930. The city's development shifted southward with the extension of the Al-Mu'tahada railway in 1936. With the growth of Mit Ghamr, the village of Daqadous also grew. The city's area reached 0.68 km^{2} in 1950, influenced by development projects during that period, such as the establishment of a cotton gin, oil and textile industries, and the development of the health system. The development of Daqadous merged with that of Mit Ghamr during that period until it was annexed in 1968. With the city's rapid urban growth in all directions, its area reached approximately 2.52 km^{2} in 1974. Over time, the area increased to 3.58 km^{2} in 1984, 3.81 km^{2} in 2000, and 4.41 km^{2} in 2006. Today, the city of Ghamr is a separate section from its center, with no sheikhdoms. Its center has 53 villages.

=== Villages ===
Mit Ghamr is surrounded by many villages such as Mit Yaeish, Mit El Faramawi, Mit Nagy, Dundait, Masara, Simbo Maqam, Makkam, Kafr Serenga, Sant Mai, and Sanafa. Those villages are located around the city where farmers grow various crops such as corn, rice, wheat and cotton.

=== Climate ===
Köppen-Geiger climate classification system classifies its climate as hot desert (BWh).The average annual temperature is approximately 21.8 °C, and the total annual rainfall reaches 36 mm. During the summer months, maximum temperatures range between 32 and 36 °C, with humidity levels ranging from 46 to 55%, which increases the sensation of heat.

In winter, temperatures are more moderate, ranging from 10 to 21 °C, with rainfall rates as low as 8 mm per month. In spring and autumn, the weather is relatively mild, with temperatures ranging from 18 to 30 °C, with low rainfall. The city records its highest temperatures in July and August, while January is the coldest month of the year. Mit Ghamr is affected by northerly winds, which help moderate the weather, but it can sometimes experience hot winds during the spring.

Climate data for Mit Ghamr
Month	Jan	Feb	Mar	Apr	May	Jun	Jul	Aug	Sep	Oct	Nov	Dec	Year
Mean daily maximum °C (°F)	18.7 (65.7)	20 (68)	22.8 (73.0)	27 (81)	31.6 (88.9)	33.8 (92.8)	34 (93)	34 (93)	32.1 (89.8)	29.6 (85.3)	25 (77)	20.7 (69.3)	27.4 (81.4)
Daily mean °C (°F)	12 (54)	12.9 (55.2)	15.4 (59.7)	18.9 (66.0)	23.1 (73.6)	25.8 (78.4)	26.8 (80.2)	26.7 (80.1)	24.8 (76.6)	22.5 (72.5)	19 (66)	14.3 (57.7)	20.2 (68.3)
Mean daily minimum °C (°F)	5.4 (41.7)	5.9 (42.6)	8.1 (46.6)	10.9 (51.6)	14.7 (58.5)	17.8 (64.0)	19.7 (67.5)	19.5 (67.1)	17.5 (63.5)	15.5 (59.9)	13 (55)	8 (46)	13.0 (55.3)
Average precipitation mm (inches)	9 (0.4)	6 (0.2)	5 (0.2)	2 (0.1)	2 (0.1)	0 (0)	0 (0)	0 (0)	0 (0)	3 (0.1)	6 (0.2)	10 (0.4)	43 (1.7)
Source: Climate-Data.org

== Population ==
The population of markaz MIT Ghamr is 698,863 as of 2023and the population of Mit Ghamr city is 156,319 as of 2023.

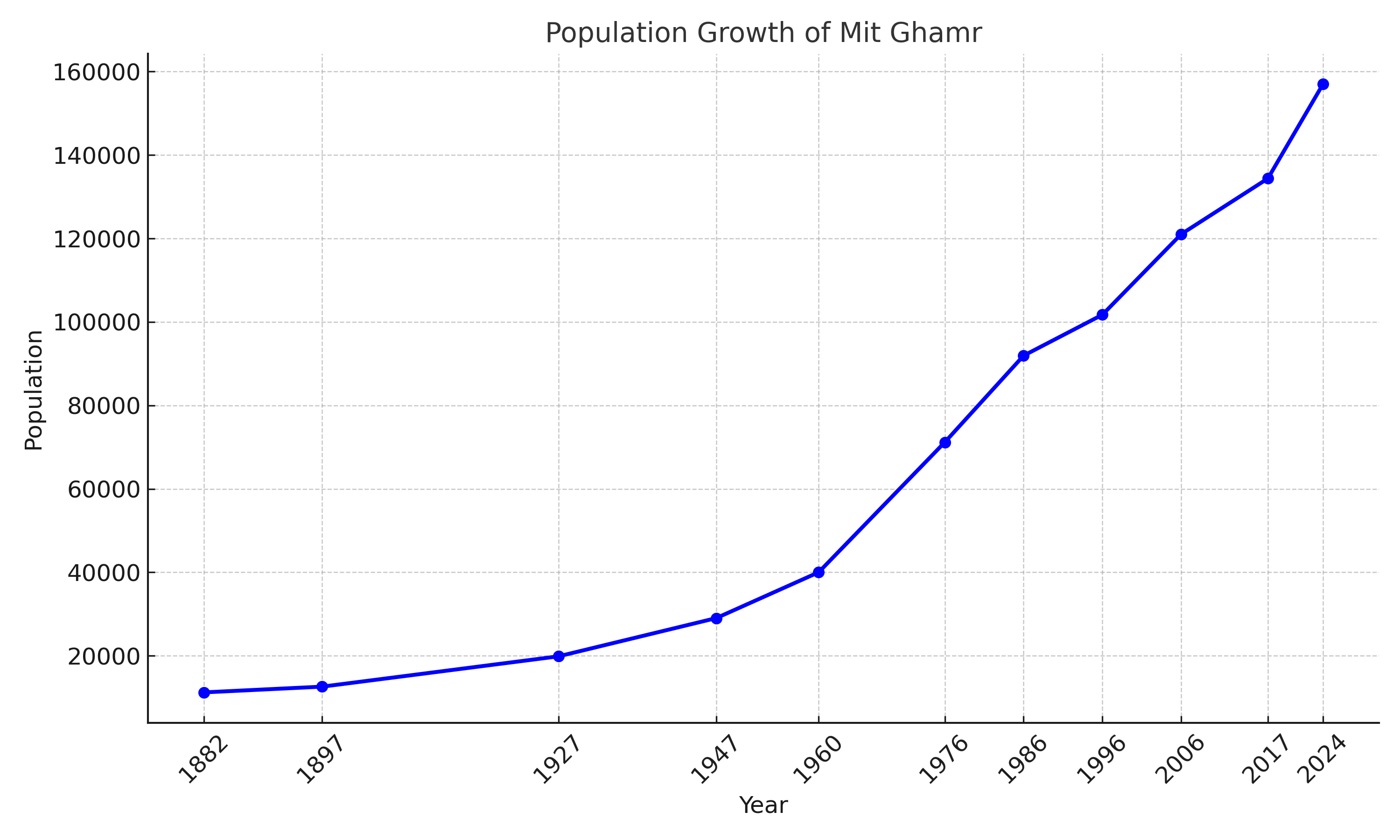
Mit ghamr population growth from 1882 to 2024

== Education ==
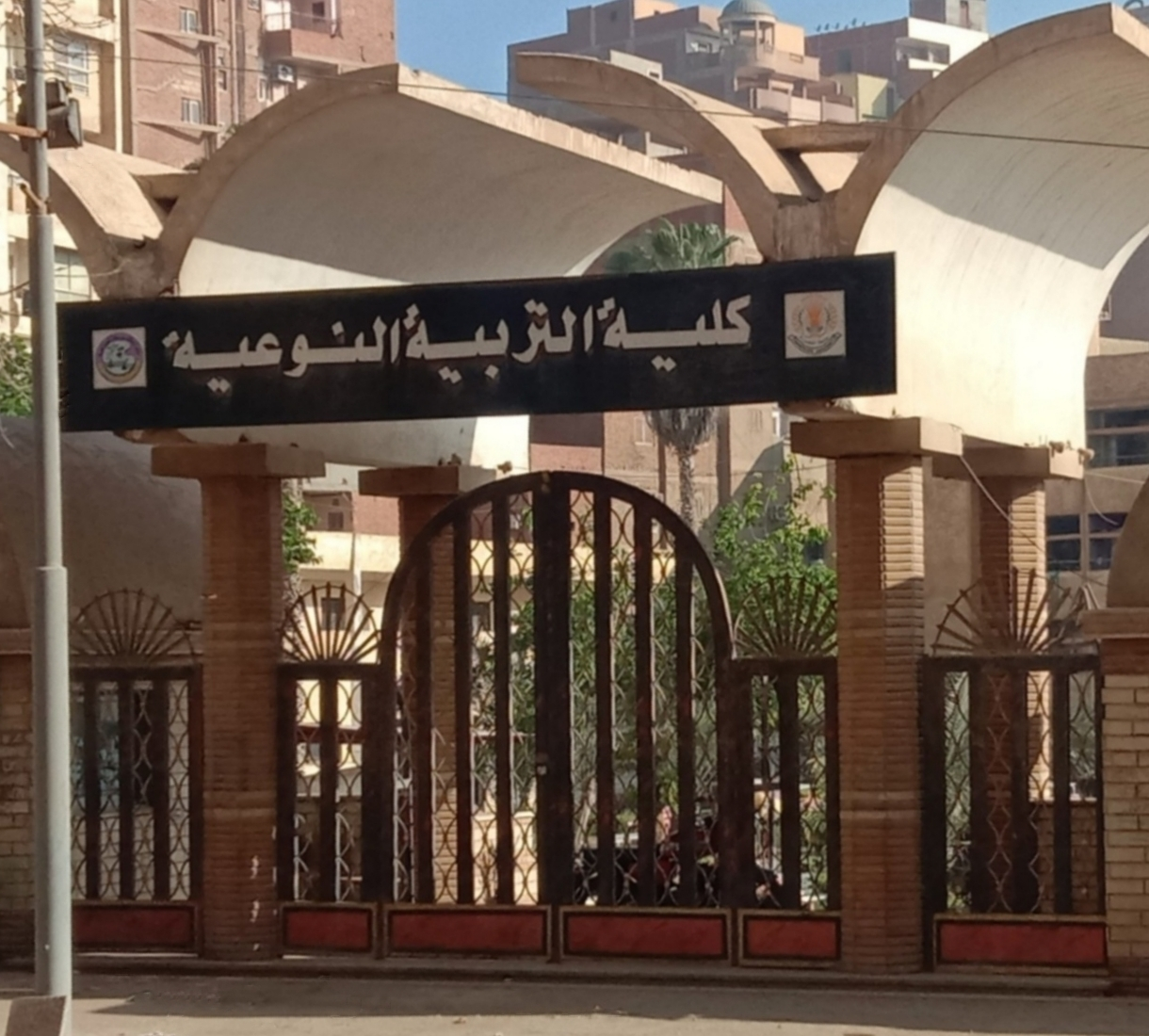
Entrance to the Faculty of Specific Education in Mit Ghamr

The educational sector is one of the most prominent sectors in Mit Ghamr, commensurate with the city's population size and geographical location. The city includes a group of educational institutions covering various levels and fields.Inside Mit Ghamr itself is the Faculty of Specific Education, Mansoura University Branch.

Mit Ghamr is home to a large number of educational institutions, including public and private schools of various types, including primary, preparatory, and secondary schools, which include general and technical education, as well as agricultural, architectural, industrial, and commercial specialties, in addition to Al-Azhar institutes. The oldest school in the city is the Coptic Archaeological School, established in 1900. The city also includes the Egyptian-Japanese School in Mit Ghamr, which employs the Japanese educational model.

== Economy ==
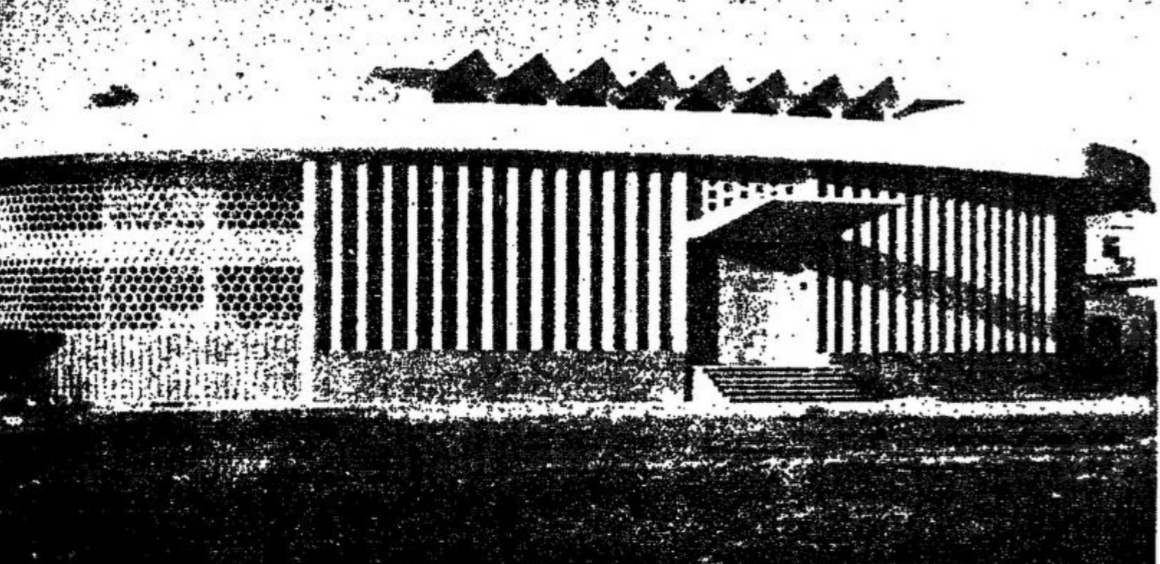
Old photo for Mit Ghamr savings bank

In Mit Ghamr was the city in which Dr. Ahmad El Naggar set up the first Islamic bank which pioneered the global Islamic Banking system.The bank based on profit and loss sharing instead of interest. By 1967, it had 53 branches, making Mit Ghamr the first city to host a fully Sharia-compliant financial institution. The bank became a model for modern Islamic banking worldwide.

Mit Ghamr is an aluminum production centre in Egypt, To solve the problems facing the aluminum industry, including the crisis of factory owners spread within residential areas and noise, visual and air pollution, President Abdel Fattah El-Sisi inaugurated the Mit Ghamr Investment Zone, covering a total area of 18 acres, at a cost of EGP 418 million, with the aim of supporting economic and social development in Egypt, attracting foreign investments, encouraging local investments and providing job opportunities, as it includes 107 industrial units., which is the first zone specialized in metal and engineering industries in Egypt, supporting medium and large projects.

There are also some textile mills at Mit Ghamr and factories for producing clay bricks, clothing, papyrus, glass, furniture, and poultry and animal feed.

The city houses a silo in Mit Ghamr with a total storage capacity of 120,000 tons. Established in 2018, it aims to enhance the strategic wheat stockpile and reduce waste, contributing to food security and improving the efficiency of grain management in the region.

== Sports ==
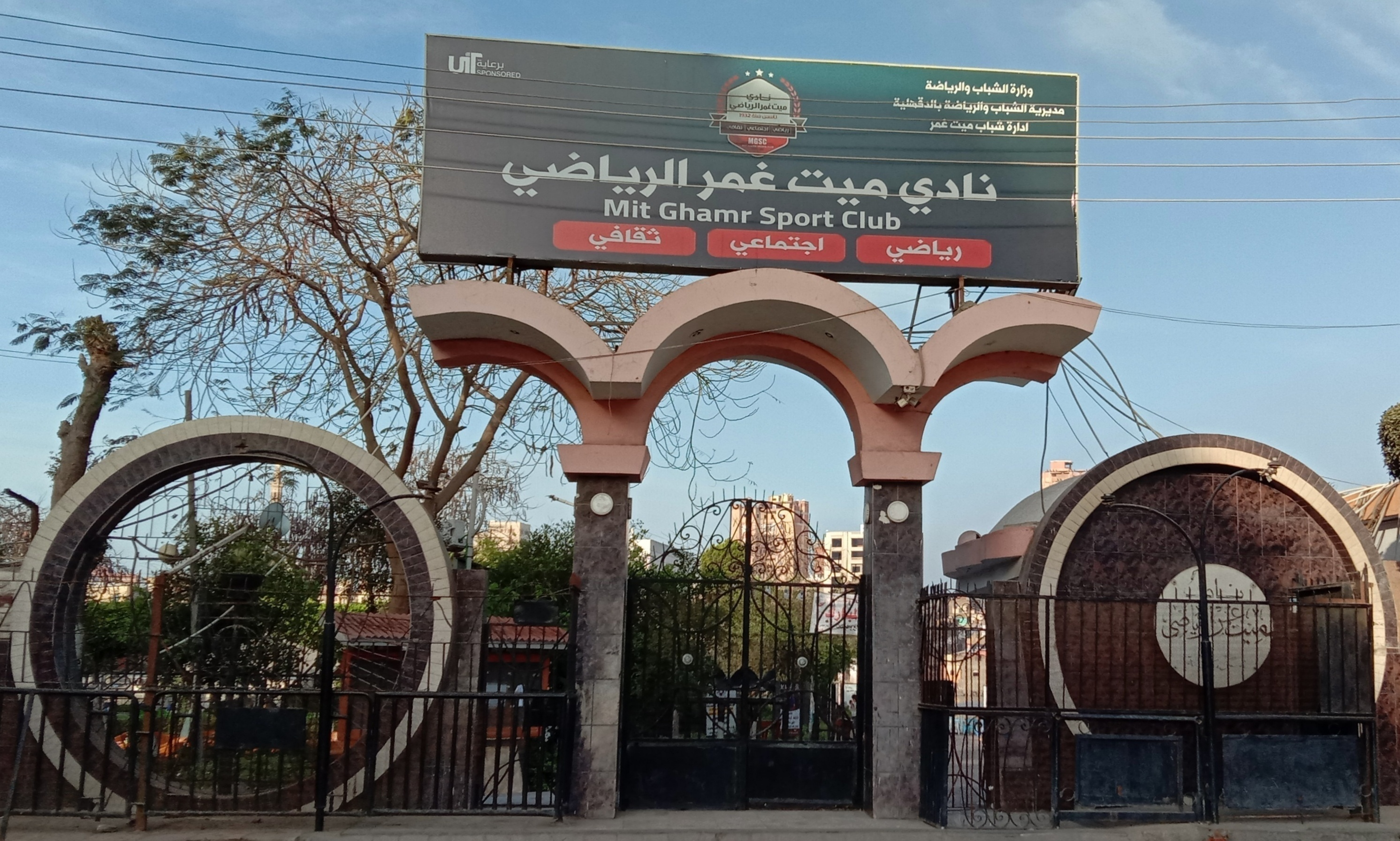
The main entrance to Mit Ghamr Sports Club

Mit Ghamr is home to two main stadiums: Mit Ghamr Sports Stadium and Daqadus Stadium, which host various local and regional sports events. The city also has Mit Ghamr Sporting Club, providing facilities for multiple sports and athletic training. In addition, the Youth Development Center in Mit Ghamr supports sports programs and activities for young people, promoting health, fitness, and community engagement.

== Culture ==
=== Literature and theater ===
Mit Ghamr has played an important role in Egyptian cultural and literary life. The city has two theaters: a large main theater that regularly hosts plays and performances, and a smaller stage located inside the local Culture Palace. It also produced prominent literary figures such as No'man Ashour, one of the pioneers of modern Egyptian theater, as well as poets like Mostafa El-Saharty and Hairam El-Ghamrawy. Mit Ghamr has frequently been celebrated in Arabic poetry. The poet Ahmed Zaki Abu Shadi dedicated a notable poem, "Dhikra Mit Ghamr" (the memory of Mit Ghamr), in which he praised the beauty of the city after his visit to it, while many other poems have mentioned the city in contexts of admiration and reflection. Mit Ghamr also appeared in elegiac poetry by several poets after the great fire of 1902.

The city also appeared in Arabic prose. The Egyptian novelist Naguib Al-Kilani set part of his award-winning novel "Al-Tariq Al-Taweel" (The Long Road) in Mit Ghamr. The story follows a rural child who travels to the city to receive medical treatment, only to witness the harsh treatment of the townspeople under the British occupation. The novel, which won a national prize, was later taught in Egyptian secondary schools, reflecting its cultural and educational importance. Mit Ghamr also appeared in travel writing. The Dominican priest Johann Michael Vansleb, who visited Egypt in the 17th century, described Mit Ghamr as a beautiful city with a large Christian population. Around the same period, the Ottoman traveler Evliya Çelebi mentioned the city in his famous Seyahatname, praising it as "the great city of Mit Ghamr" and recording its landmarks. Other travelers likewise described the town during their journeys through the Nile Delta, highlighting its social and cultural significance across different periods.

=== Folklore ===
Mit Ghamr is referenced in a popular Egyptian proverb that says: "Nothing is worse than Zefta except Mit Ghamr". The origin of this saying is believed to date back to the time of the British occupation of Egypt, when British forces, after suppressing the popular resistance in the city of Zefta, moved on to Mit Ghamr, where they reportedly faced even fiercer resistance.

=== Cuisine ===
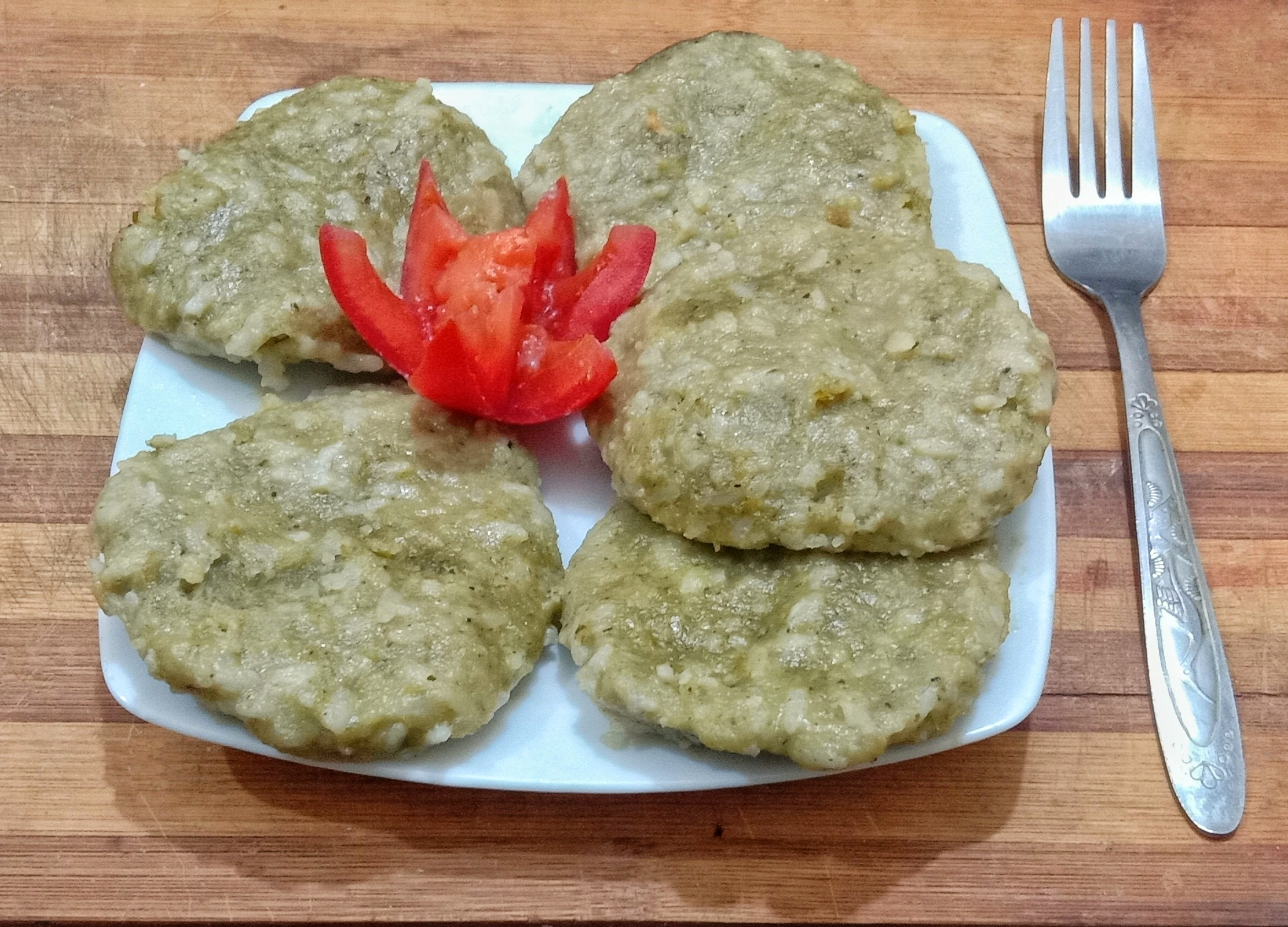
Ghamrawi kubebah

The city is also well known for its traditional dish Ghamrawi kubebah (or Mit Ghamr kubebah), which consists of minced meat, rice, and vegetables. This local variation is distinct from other types of kubebah found in Egypt due to its unique preparation method and regional flavor.

=== Architecture ===
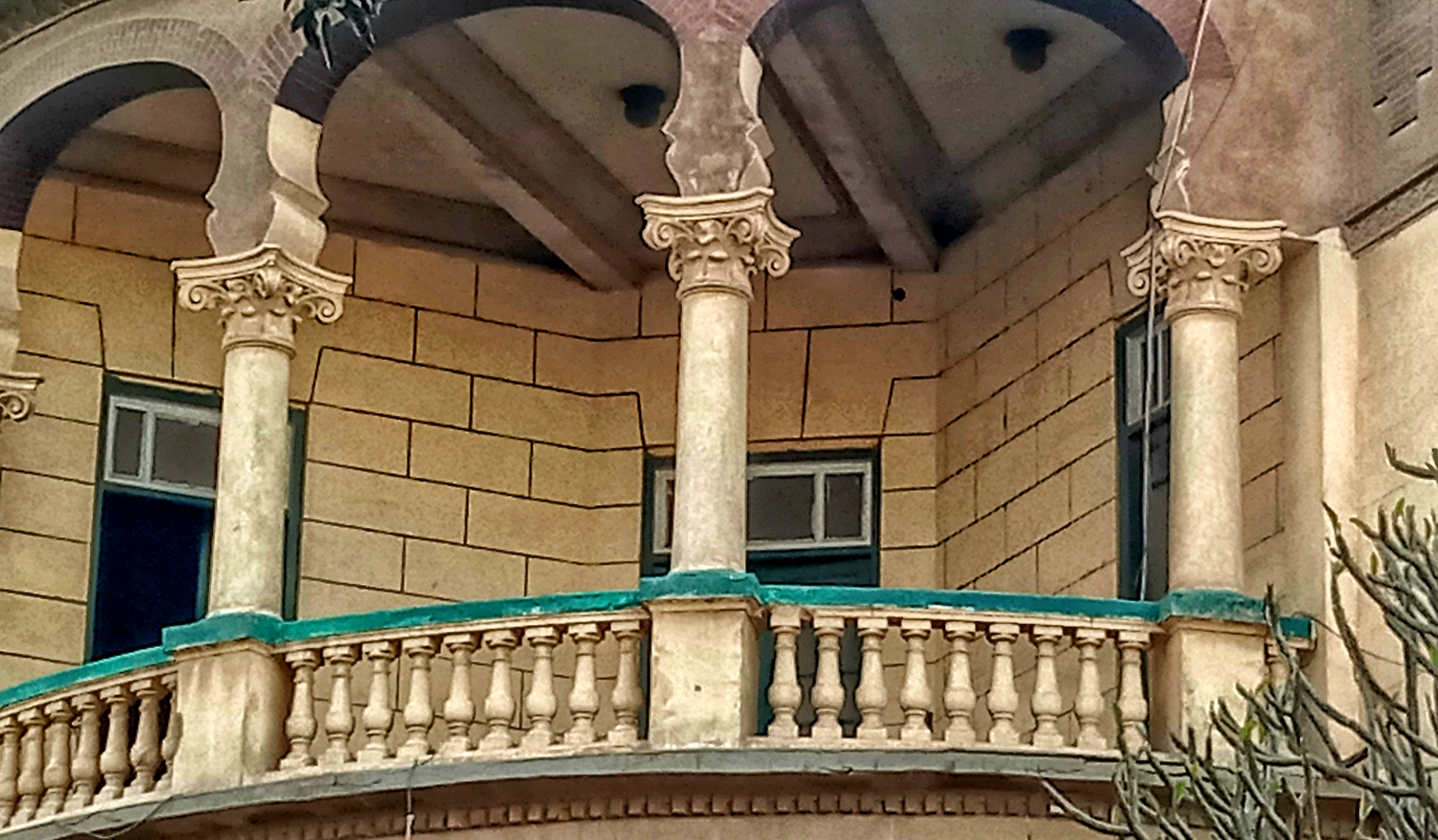
Composite order of Dawoud Bek Salama palace

Mit Ghamr experienced an architectural boom in the late 19th century and the first half of the 20th century. Several buildings from that era still survive today, featuring European architectural styles that were popular in Egypt during that time.

== Religion ==
=== Islam ===
The vast majority of the city's population, like most Egyptian cities, are Muslims, specifically Sunni Muslims The number of Muslims in the city reached 86,783 people in the 1986 census out of a total population of 91,927, The city also contains a large number of mosques and small prayer corners.

=== Christianity ===
Mit Ghamr is a separate diocese that includes Dakadous and the eastern lands. It has a group of Orthodox churches.

Christians in the city constitute a small percentage, and the majority of them are Coptic Orthodox, and the number of them reached 5,133 in the 1986 census, out of a total population of 91,927 in the city at thistime. The city also contains many churches for the Orthodox and Protestant denominations, and some of these churches are considered historic churches, such as:

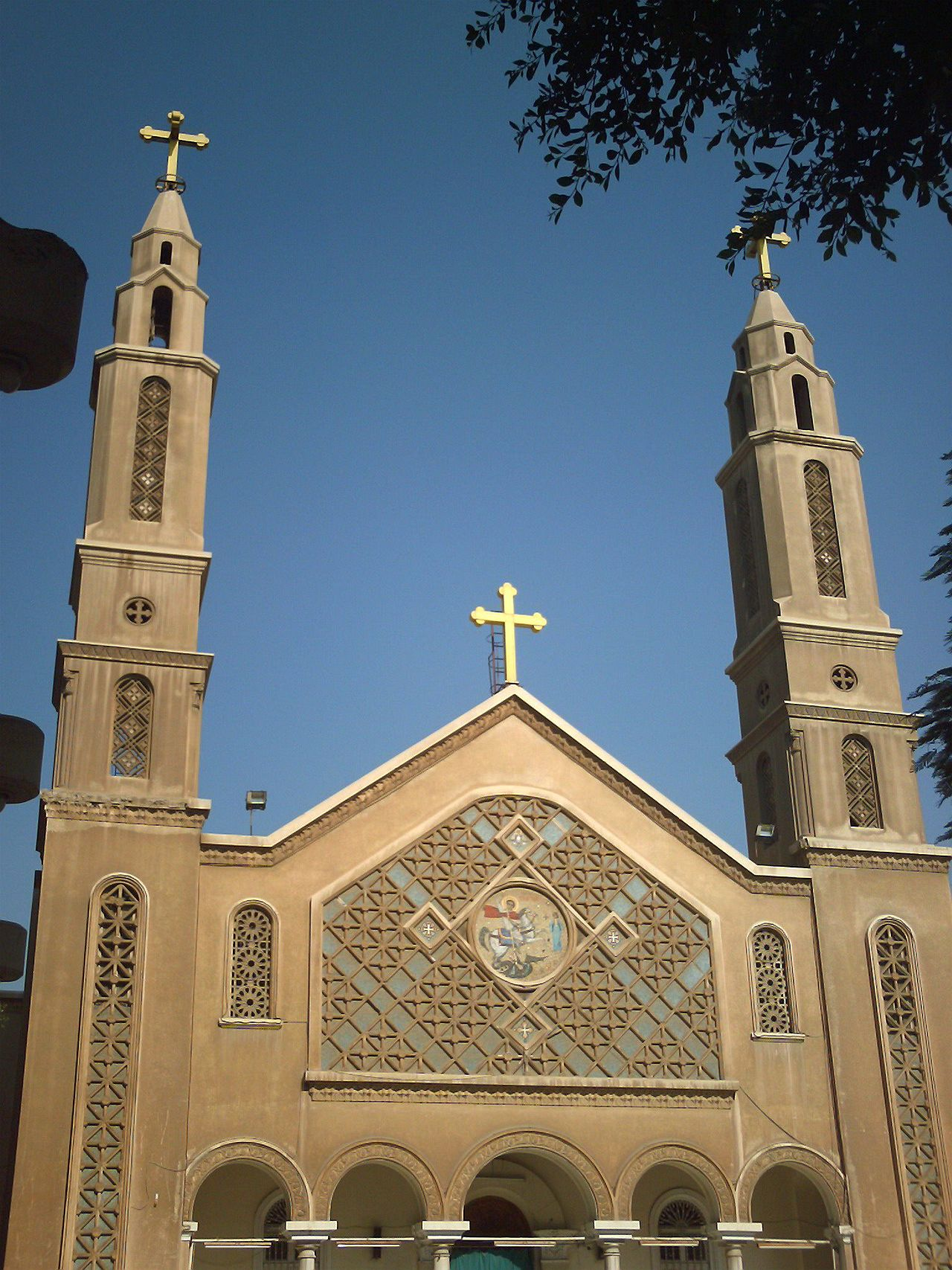
Mar Girgis (San george) church in Mit Ghamr

- A large Coptic Orthodox Church, called the Great Martyr Mar Girgis (Saint George) church which is located on Al-Asmar Street. The church has been there for many years. Some people thought that Saint George appeared in the church around the year 1902 when there was a big fire in the town and the church was the only place saved from the fire, claiming that they saw him hovering on top of the church with his horse.
- The Evangelical Church is a private church for the Protestant sect, built by the British in 1926. It is the most important and largest Protestant church in the region.

=== Judaism ===
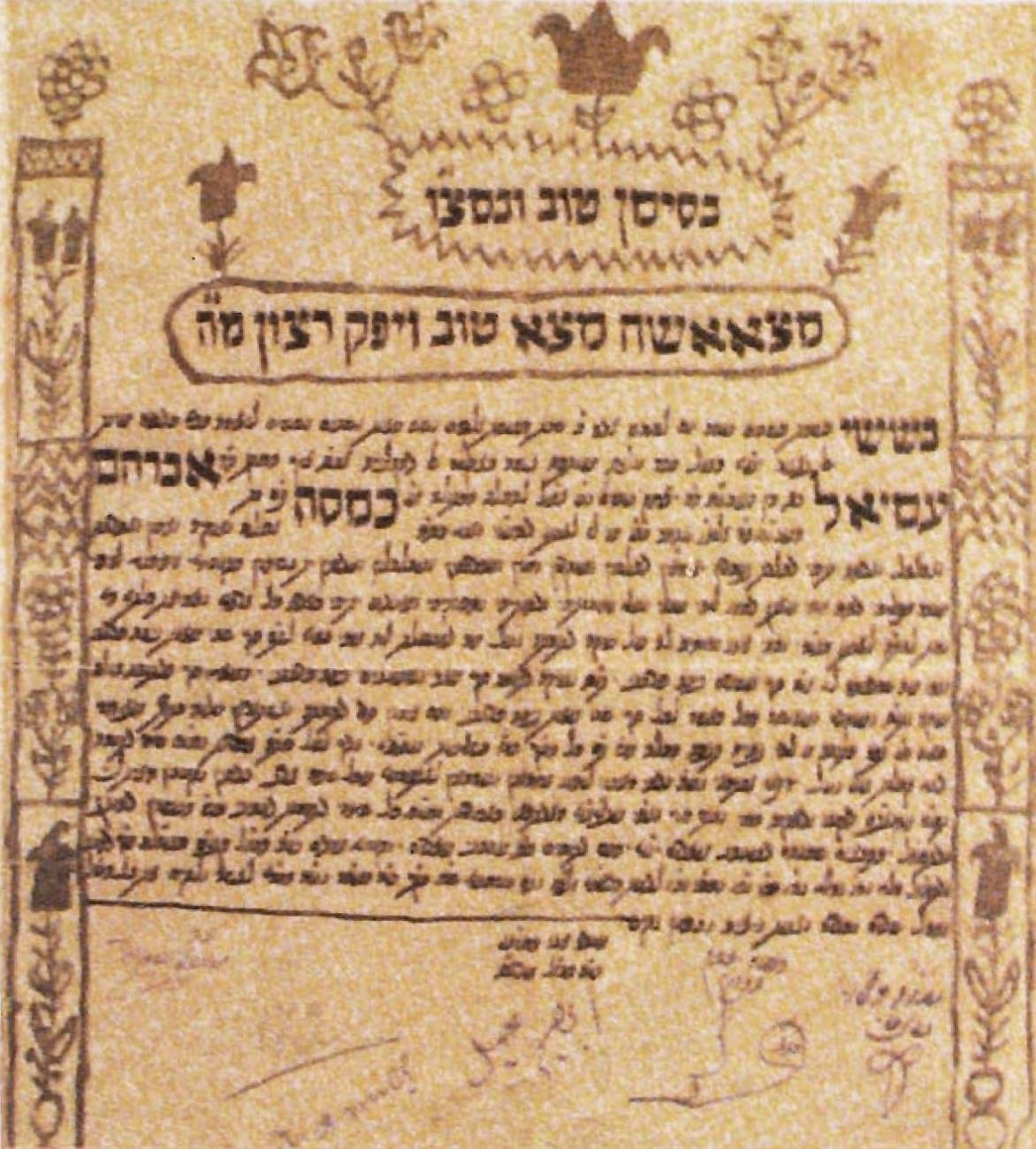
A marriage contract from Mit Ghamr (1903), decorated with motifs from Egyptian folklore

Mit Ghamr was known for having a relatively large Jewish community, many of whose members worked in commerce. Statistics from 1902 indicate that its population numbered approximately 242 people at the beginning of the 20th century. The community reportedly had at least two synagogues, one of which was known as the Clement Bardo Synagogue. The community also owned a bakery for preparing matzah, an unleavened bread eaten by Jews during Passover. In addition, a mikveh (Jewish ritual bath) was found in the city of Mit Ghamr, and there was a Jewish quarter known as the Jewish Quarter, which still exists today.

== Notable people ==
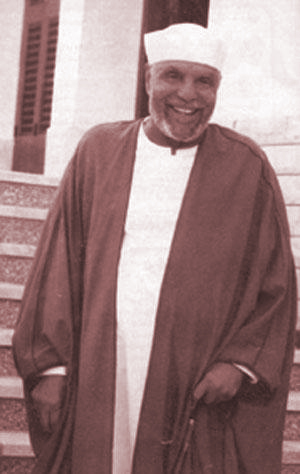
Sheikh Muhammad AL Shaarawy

- Mit Ghamr is home to one of the best known Islamic scholars, Sheikh Muhammad Metwally Al Shaarawy, who was born in the village of Daqadus where he was finally buried.
- Noman Ashour is an Egyptian poet and playwright, born in Mit Ghamr, He is known for establishing realism in Egyptian drama, He has many plays that have been felt among Egyptians.
- Gehad Grisha is Egyptian former football referee who refereed in the Egyptian Premier League from and was a FIFA-listed referee from. He refereed at five consecutive Africa Cup of Nations tournaments between 2012 and 2019, and also officiated at the 2018 FIFA World Cup.
- Salah Nasr is an Egyptian military and political leader, born in the village of Santamay, Mit Ghamr District, He was the head of the Egyptian General Intelligence Service between 1957 and 1967, Salah Nasr is considered the most famous head of Egyptian intelligence and has a prominent role in raising the status of Egyptian General Intelligence, Many successful operations were carried out during his tenure.
- Selim Hassan was the most famous Egyptian Egyptologist Born in Mit Nagi, Mit Ghamr, He was the first native Egyptian to be appointed Professor of Egyptology at the University of Cairo, a post he held from 1936 to 1939, He was then made Deputy-Director of the Antiquities Service. he wrote the 18-volume Encyclopedia of Ancient Egypt in Arabic and supervised the excavation of many ancient Egyptian tombs under the auspices of Cairo University.
- Hemat Mustafa is an Egyptian media figure born in Mit Ghamr. She is from the pioneer generation and is considered the first female broadcaster to appear on Egyptian television and read news bulletins.
