= Aljblaw =

Village in Egypt

al Jabalāw الجبلاو
- Village
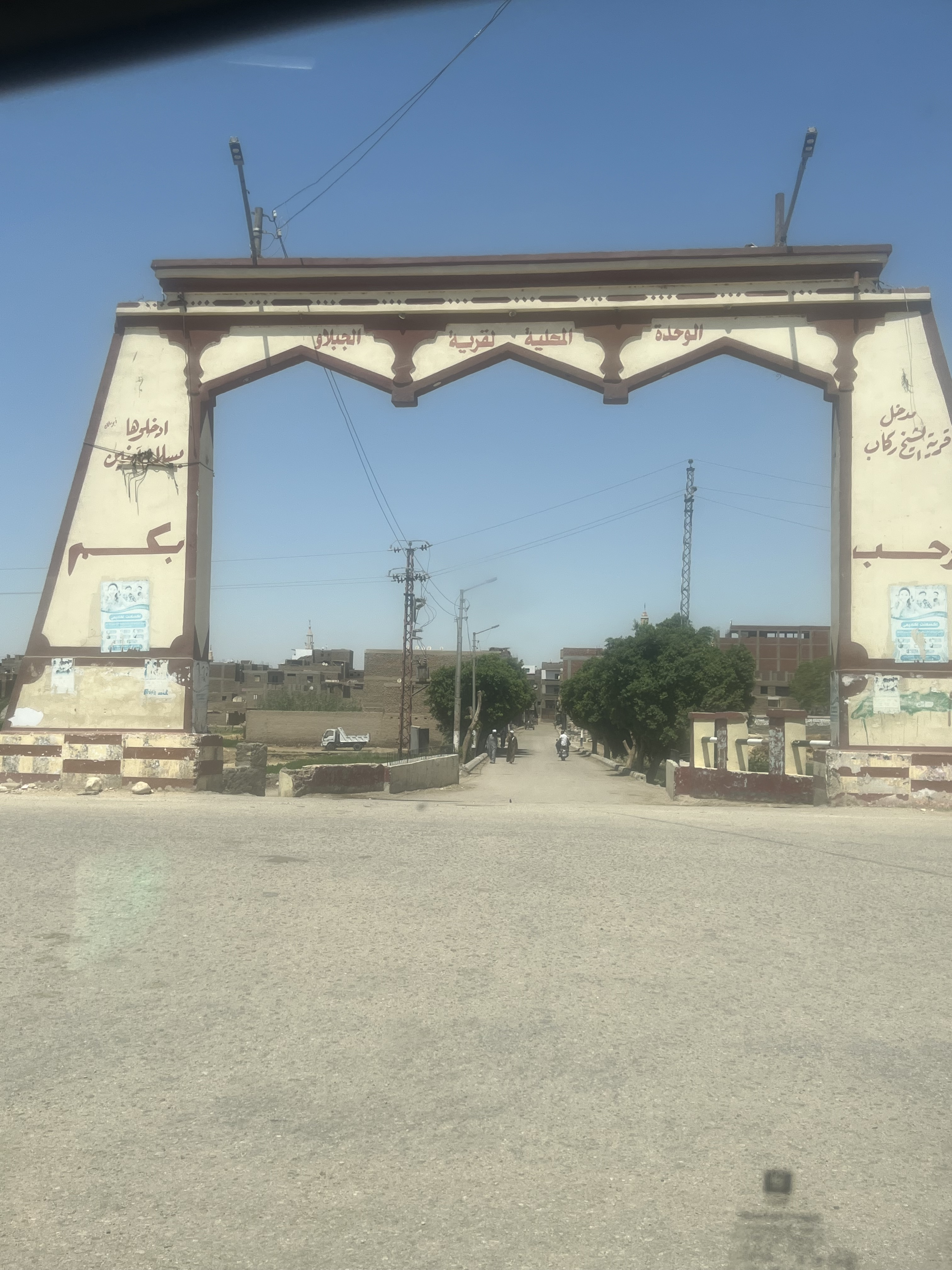
- Interactive map of al Jabalāw
- Coordinates: 26°07′59″N 32°46′36″E
- Country: Egypt
- Governorate: Qena
- Markaz: Qena

Population (January 2023)
  - Total: 16,147
- Time zone: UTC+2 (EET)
  - Summer (DST): UTC+3 (EEST)
- Postal code: 83733

al Jabalāw (Egyptian Arabic: الجبلاو) is a village located in Qena Governorate in Egypt, with a population of 16,147 people. There are 8,693 men and 7,454 women.

== See also ==
- Dendera
- Almahrousa
- Alashraf alsharqia
- Alashraf alqabalia
- Alashraf albahria
