= Aleulayqat =

Governorate of Egypt

Al ‘Ulayqāt العليقات
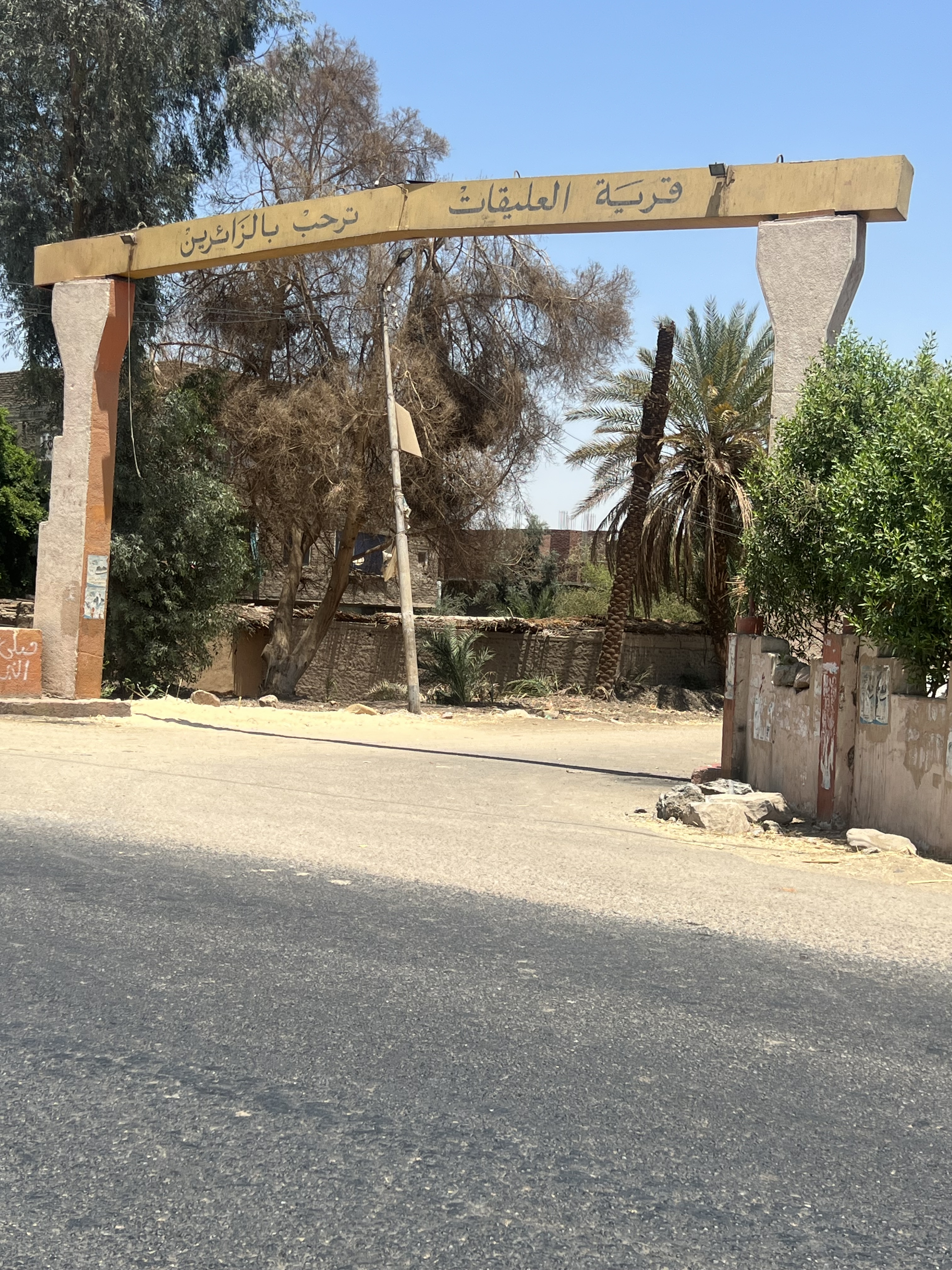
- Interactive map of Al ‘Ulayqāt العليقات
- Coordinates: 25°55′40″N 32°50′24″E
- Country: Egypt
- Seat: Qena (capital)

Area
  - Total: 1,856 km^{2} (717 sq mi)

Population (January 2023)
  - Total: 24,965
  - Density: 13.45/km^{2} (34.84/sq mi)
- Time zone: UTC+2 (EET)
  - Summer (DST): UTC+3 (EEST)
- Postal code: 83737

Aleulayqat (Arabic: العليقات) is a village in Qus, Egypt, with a population of 24,965 people. There are 12,082 men and 12,883 women.

== See also ==
- Dendera
- Almahrousa
- Alashraf alqabalia
- Alashraf alsharqia
- alashraf albahria
