= Almafrajia =

Governorate of Egypt

Al Mufarrajīyah المفرجية
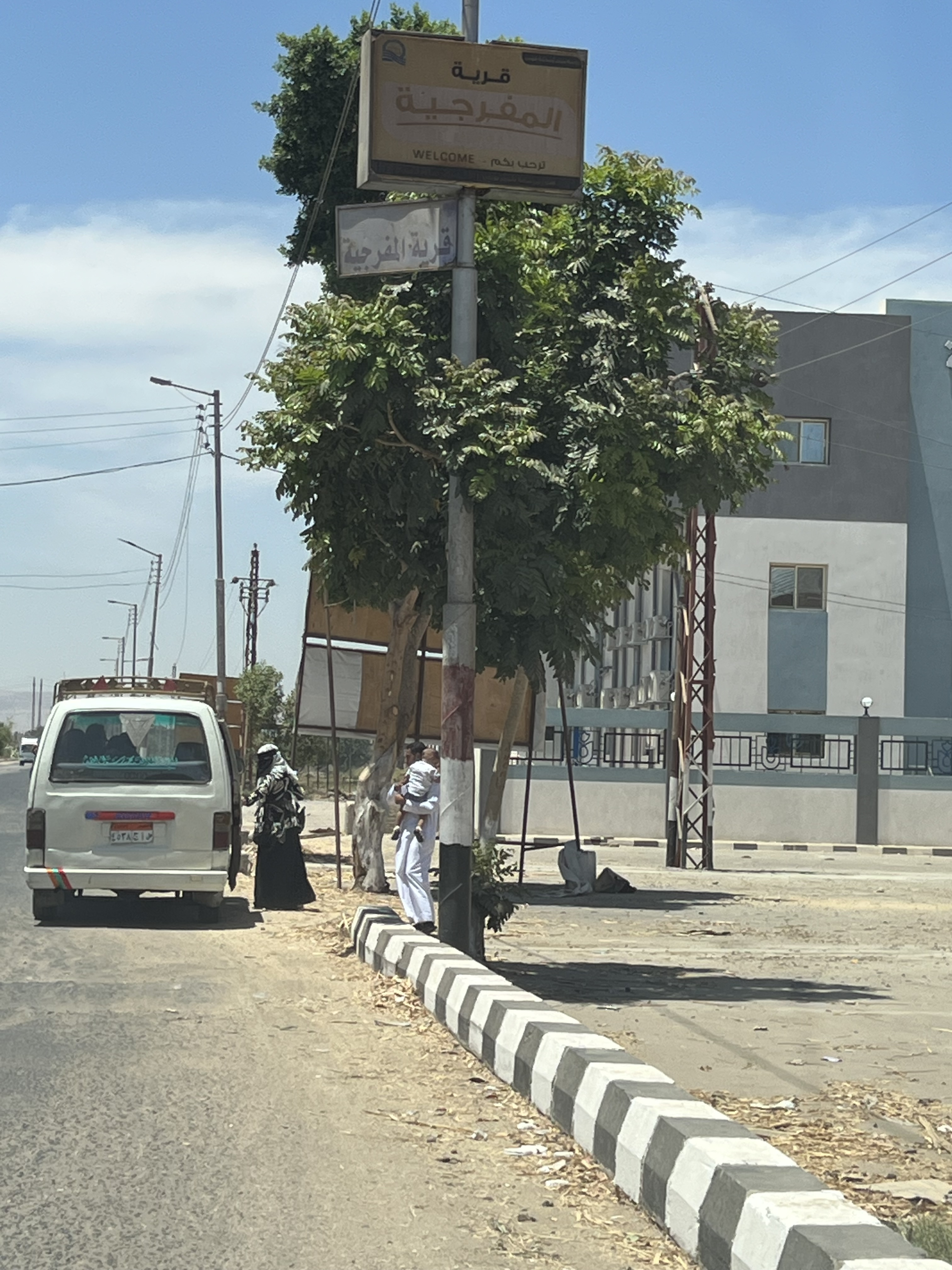
- Interactive map of Al Mufarrajīyah المفرجية
- Coordinates: 25°49′53″N 32°46′29″E
- Country: Egypt
- Seat: Qena (capital)

Area
  - Total: 755 km^{2} (292 sq mi)

Population (January 2023)
  - Total: 11,869
  - Density: 15.7/km^{2} (40.7/sq mi)
- Time zone: UTC+2 (EET)
  - Summer (DST): UTC+3 (EEST)
- Postal code: 83674

Almafrajia (Arabic: المفرجية) is a village in Qus in Egypt, with a population of 11,869 people. There are 5,860 men and 6,009 women.

== See also ==
- Dendera
- Almahrousa
- Alashraf alqabalia
- Alashraf albahria
