= Alharajia =

Village in Egypt

Al Harajiyyah الحراجية
- Village
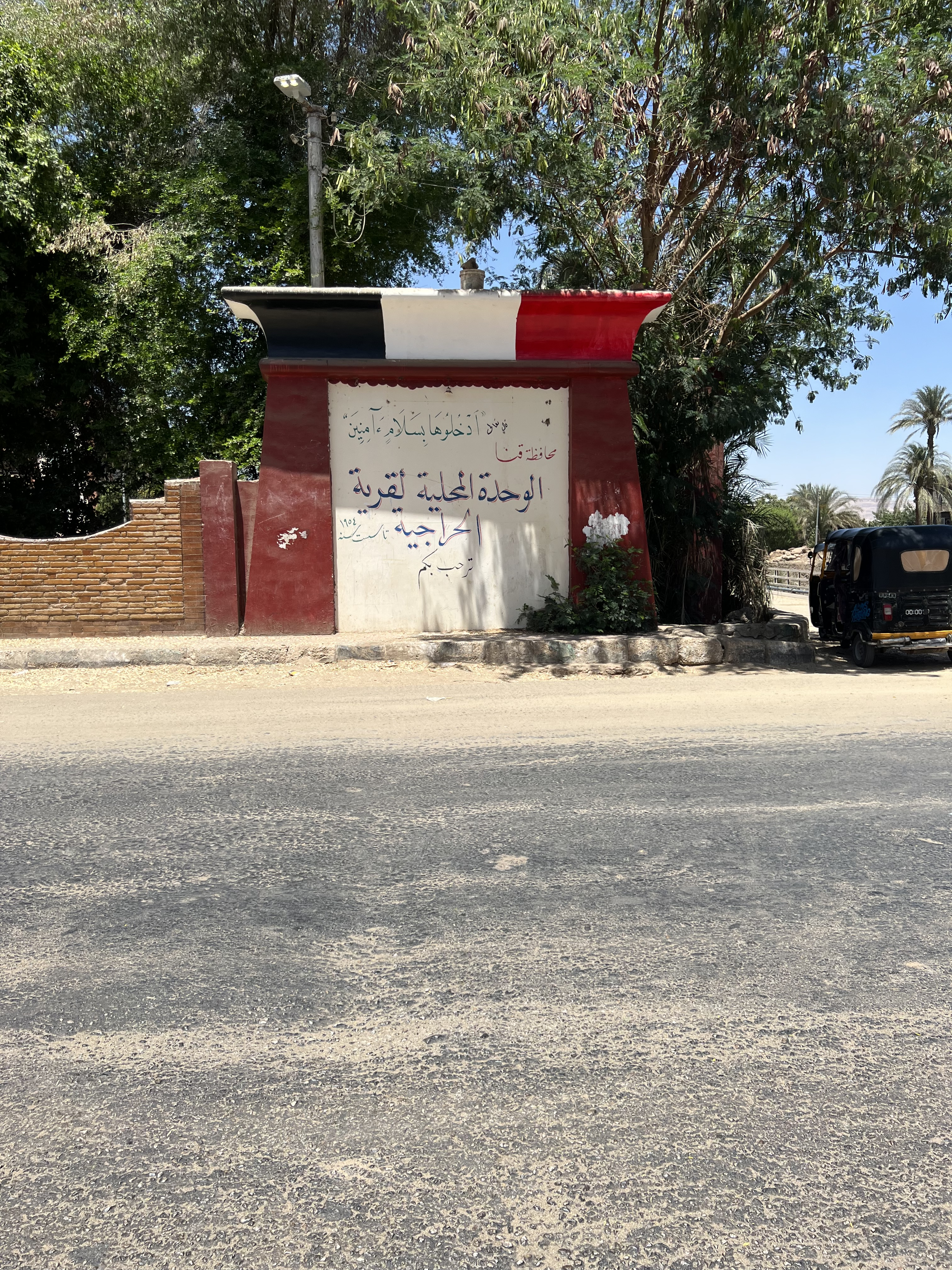
- Interactive map of Al Harajiyyah
- Coordinates: 25°56′47″N 32°46′34″E
- Country: Egypt
- Governorate: Qena
- Markaz: Qus

Population (January 2023)
  - Total: 15,281
- Time zone: UTC+2 (EET)
  - Summer (DST): UTC+3 (EEST)
- Postal code: 83624

Al Harajiyyah (Egyptian Arabic: الحراجية) is a village located in the markaz of Qus in Qena Governorate in Egypt, with a population of 15,281 people. There are 7,541 men and 7,740 women.

== See also ==
- Dendera
- Almahrousa
- Alashraf alqabalia
- Alashraf albahria
