= Khuzam (Qena) =

Village in Qena Governorate, Egypt

Khuzam خزام
- Village
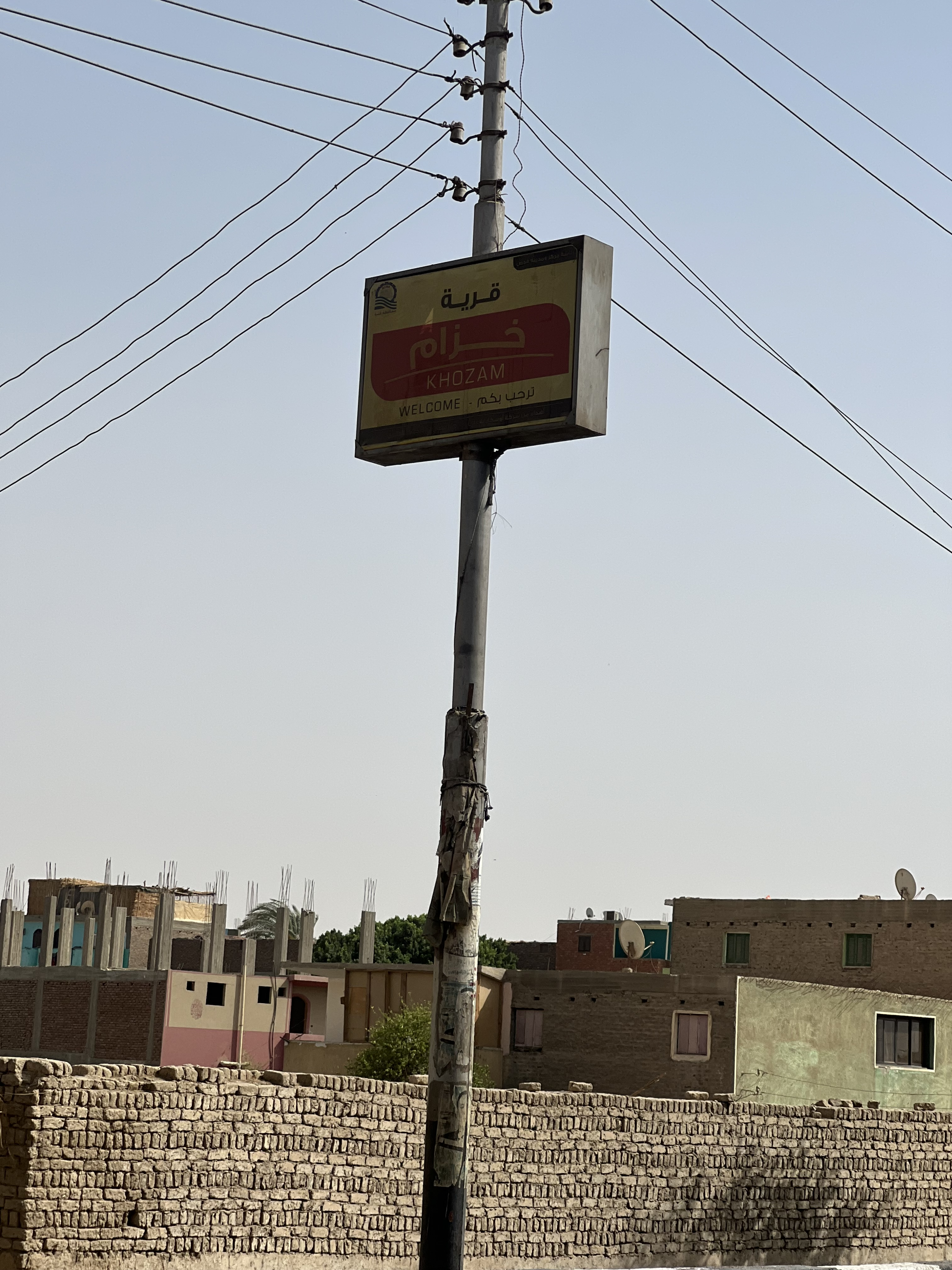
- Interactive map of Khuzam خزام
- Coordinates: 25°46′38″N 32°46′02″E
- Country: Egypt
- Governorate: Qena
- Markaz: Qus

Population (January 2023)
  - Total: 23,147
- Time zone: UTC+2 (EET)
  - Summer (DST): UTC+3 (EEST)
- Postal code: 83787

Khuzam (Arabic: خزام) is a village in Qus in Egypt, with a population of 23,147 people. There are 12,003 men and 11,144 women.

== See also ==
- Dendera
- Almahrousa
- Alashraf alqabalia
- Alashraf albahria
