= Najae aleuruba =

Village in Qena Governorate, Egypt

Naj‘ al ‘Arj نجع العروبة
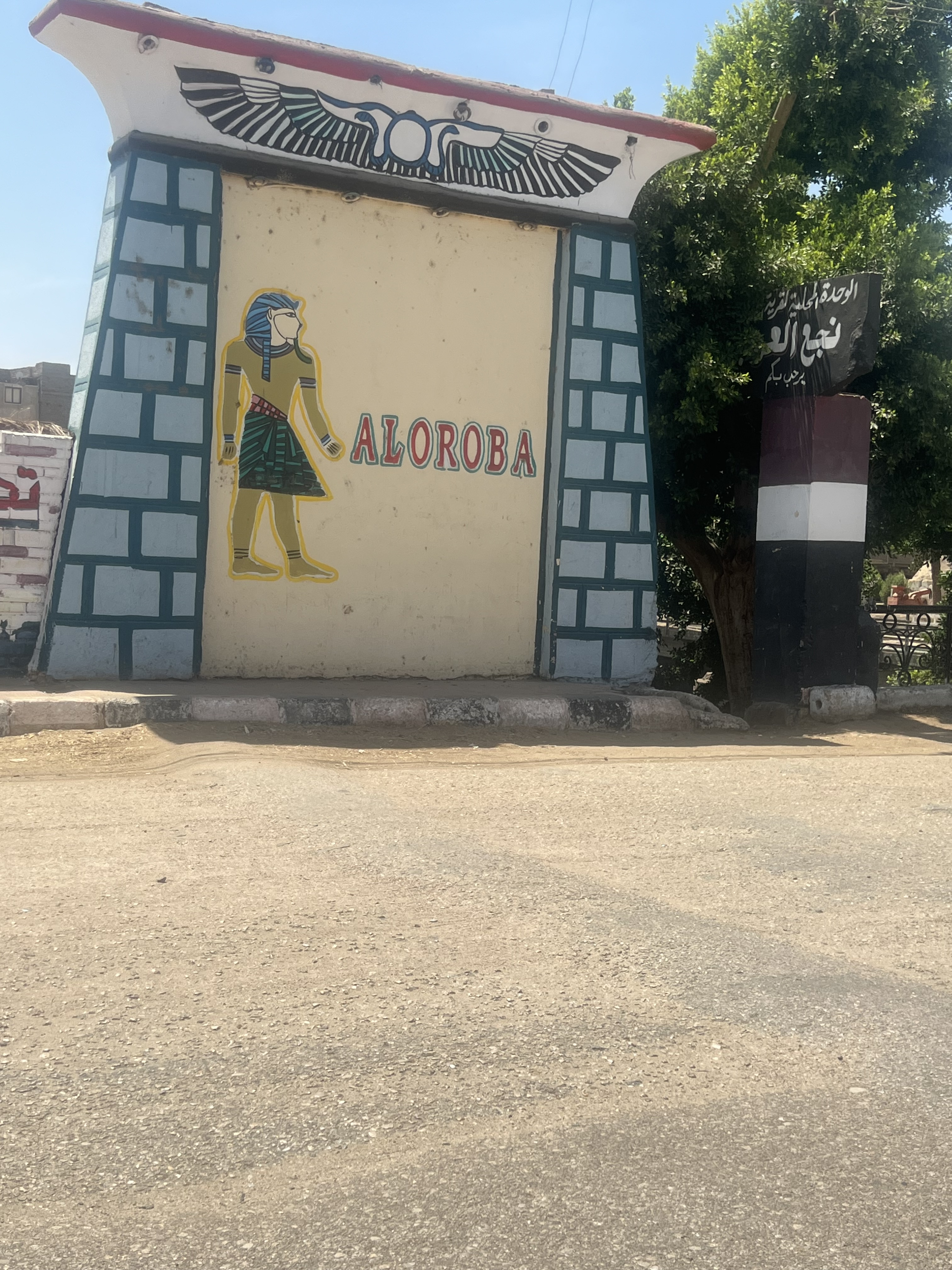
- Interactive map of Naj‘ al ‘Arj نجع العروبة
- Coordinates: 26°02′00″N 32°48′22″E
- Country: Egypt
- Governorate: Qena

Area
  - Total: 682 km^{2} (263 sq mi)

Population (January 2023)
  - Total: 7,654
  - Density: 11.2/km^{2} (29.1/sq mi)
- Time zone: UTC+2 (EET)
  - Summer (DST): UTC+3 (EEST)
- Postal code: 83798

najae aleuruba (Arabic: نجع العروبة) is a village in Qena Governorate in Egypt, with a population of 7,654 people. There are 4,054 men and 3,600 women.

== See also ==
- Dendera
- almahrusa
- Alashraf alsharqia
- Alashraf alqabalia
- Alashraf albahria
