= AlAqab (Qena) =

Al Aqab العقب
- Village
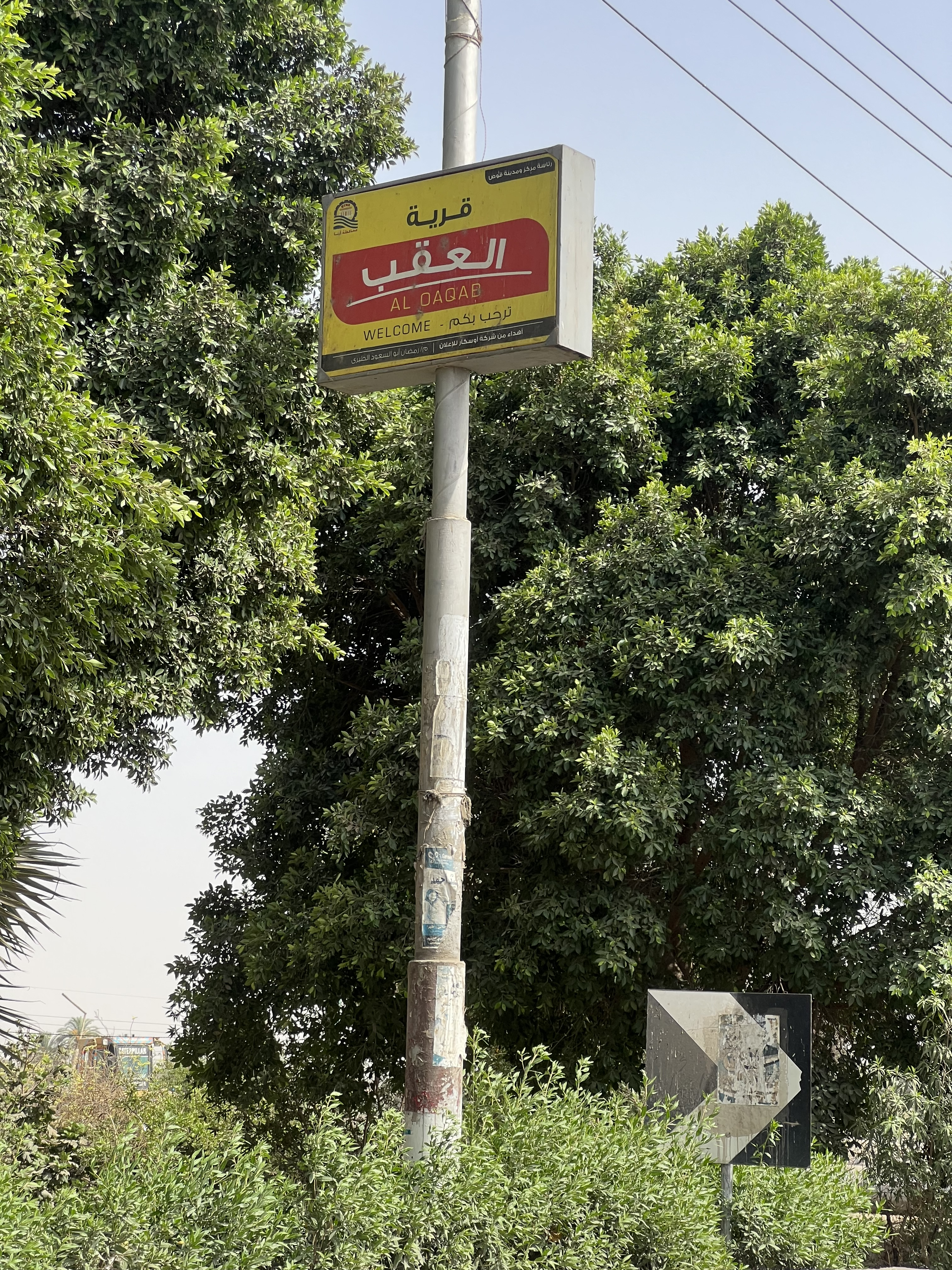

- Location within Egypt
- Coordinates: 25°48′08″N 32°47′28″E
- Country: Egypt
- Governorate: Qena
- Markaz: Qus

Area
  - Total: 1,302 km^{2} (503 sq mi)

Population (2023)
  - Total: 12,632
  - Density: 9.702/km^{2} (25.13/sq mi)
- Time zone: UTC+2 (EET)
  - Summer (DST): UTC+3 (EEST)
- Postal code: 83751

Al Aqab or Al ‘Uqb (Arabic: العقب) is a village in Qus in Egypt, with a population of 12,632 people. There are 6,153 men and 6,479 women.

== See also ==
- Dendera
- Almahrousa
- Alashraf alqabalia
- Alashraf albahria
- List of cities and towns in Egypt
