= Shunhur =

Village in Qena Governorate, Egypt

Shanhūr شنهور
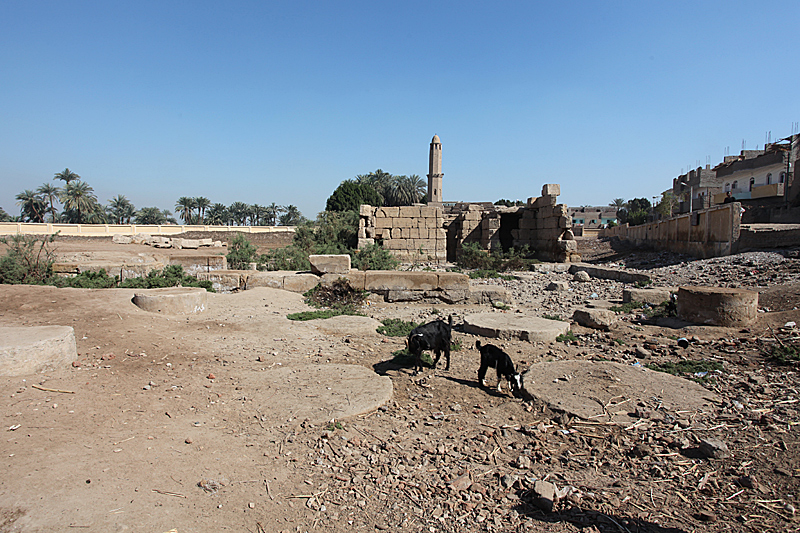
- Interactive map of Shanhūr شنهور
- Coordinates: 25°51′38″N 32°46′41″E
- Country: Egypt
- Governorate: Qena Governorate

Area
  - Total: 965 km^{2} (373 sq mi)

Population (January 2023)
  - Total: 13,432
  - Density: 13.9/km^{2} (36.1/sq mi)
- Time zone: UTC+2 (EET)
  - Summer (DST): UTC+3 (EEST)
- Postal code: 83787

Shanhūr (Arabic: شنهور) is a village in Qus in Egypt, with a population of 13,432 people. There are 6,380 men and 7,052 women.

At the edge of the village are the ruins of a Roman era temple built during the first century AD.

== See also ==
- Dendera
- almahrusa
- alasharaf alqabalia
- alashraf albahria
