= Alearki =

Village in Egypt

Al Araky العركي
- Village
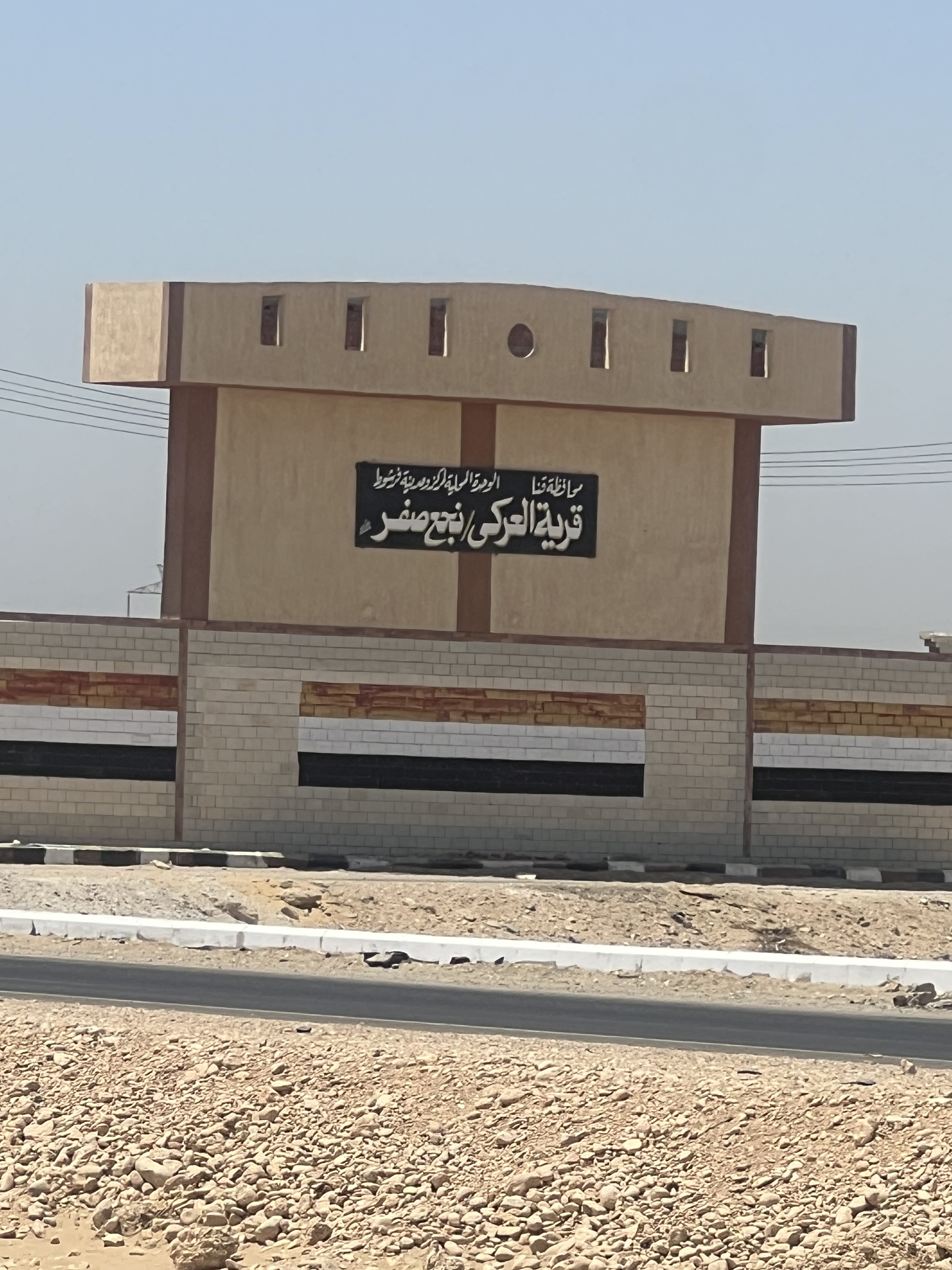
- Interactive map of Al Araky العركي
- Coordinates: 26°00′42″N 32°09′21″E
- Country: Egypt
- Governorate: Qena
- Markaz: Farshut

Population (January 2023)
  - Total: 27,987
- Time zone: UTC+2 (EET)
  - Summer (DST): UTC+3 (EEST)
- Postal code: 83624

Al-'Arki (Arabic: العركي) is a village in the markaz of Farshut, Qena, in Upper Egypt, with a population of 20,637 people in 2018.

== See also ==
- Dendera
- almahrusa
- alasharaf alqabalia
- alashraf albahria
