= Almasid =

Village in Egypt

Al Masīd المسيد
- Village
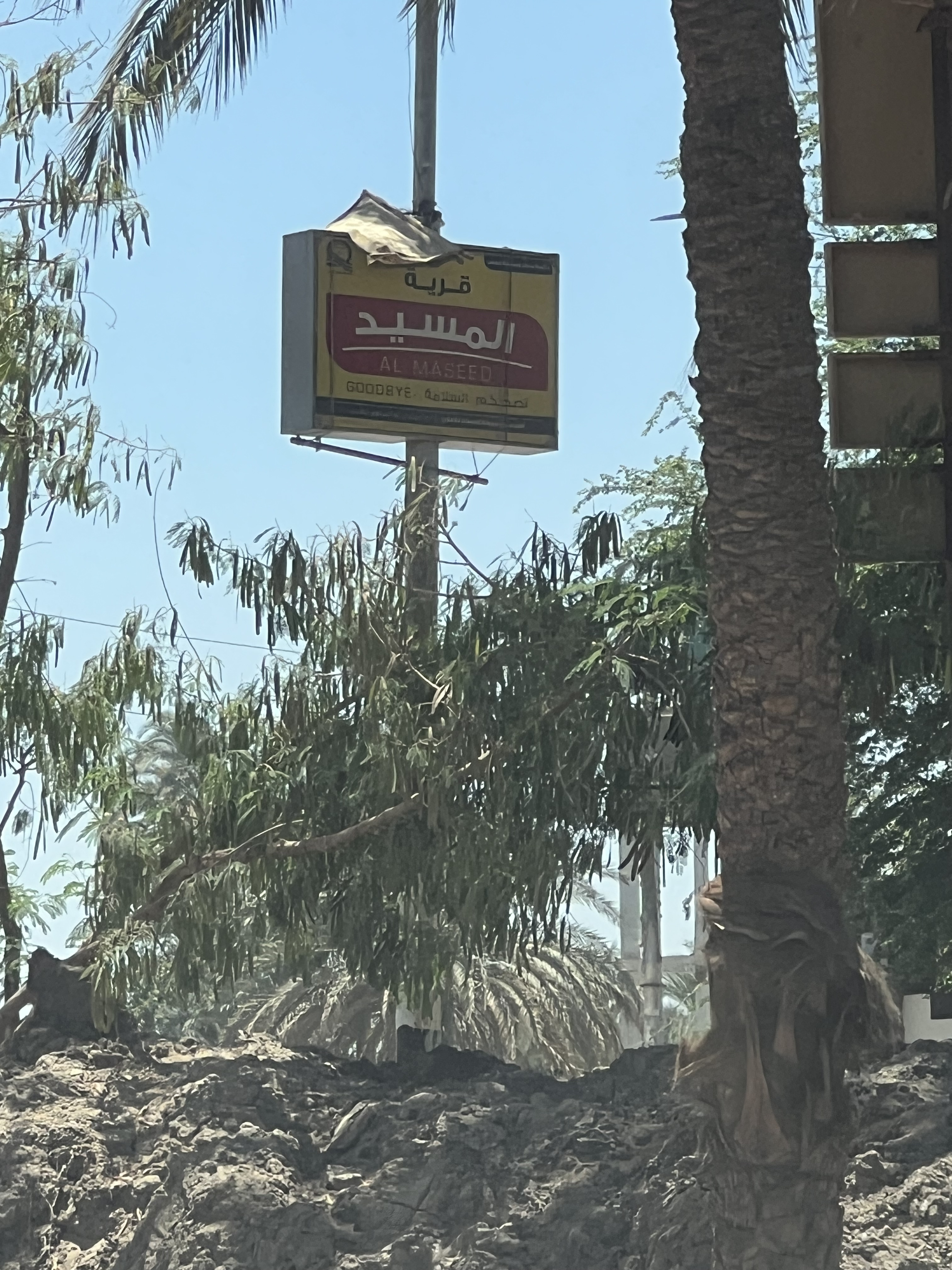
- Interactive map of Al Masīd المسيد
- Coordinates: 25°53′32″N 32°48′09″E
- Country: Egypt
- Governorate: Qena
- Markaz: Qus

Population (January 2023)
  - Total: 11,977
- Time zone: UTC+2 (EET)
  - Summer (DST): UTC+3 (EEST)

Al Masid (Arabic: المسيد) is a village in Qus in Egypt, with a population of 11,977 people as of 2023. There are 5,652 men and 6,352 women.

== See also ==
- Dendera
- Almahrousa
- Alashraf alqabalia
- Alashraf albahria
