= Alqala =

Village in Egypt

Al Qalaa القلعة
- Village
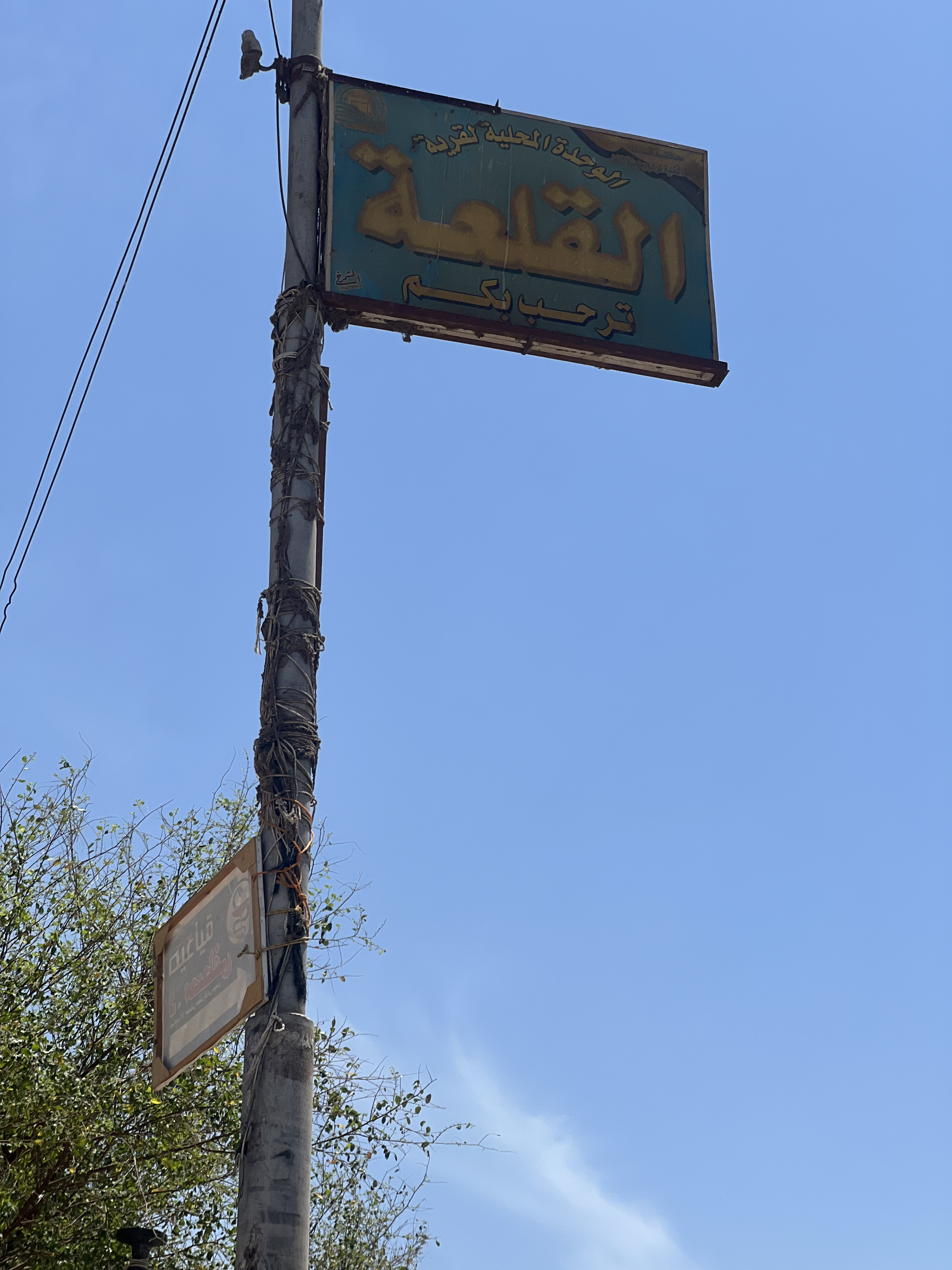
- Interactive map of Al Qalaa
- Coordinates: 26°01′29″N 32°49′55″E
- Country: Egypt
- Governorate: Qena
- Markaz: Qift

Population (January 2023)
  - Total: 14,989
- Time zone: UTC+2 (EET)
  - Summer (DST): UTC+3 (EEST)

Alqala (Egyptian Arabic: القلعة) is a village in the markaz of Qift in Qena Governorate in Egypt. The population size is about 14,989 people, of whom 7,309 are men and 7,680 are women.

== See also ==
- Dendera
- Almahrousa
- Alashraf alqabalia
- Alashraf albahria
