= Albarahima =

Village in Egypt

Al Barahmah البراهمة
- Village
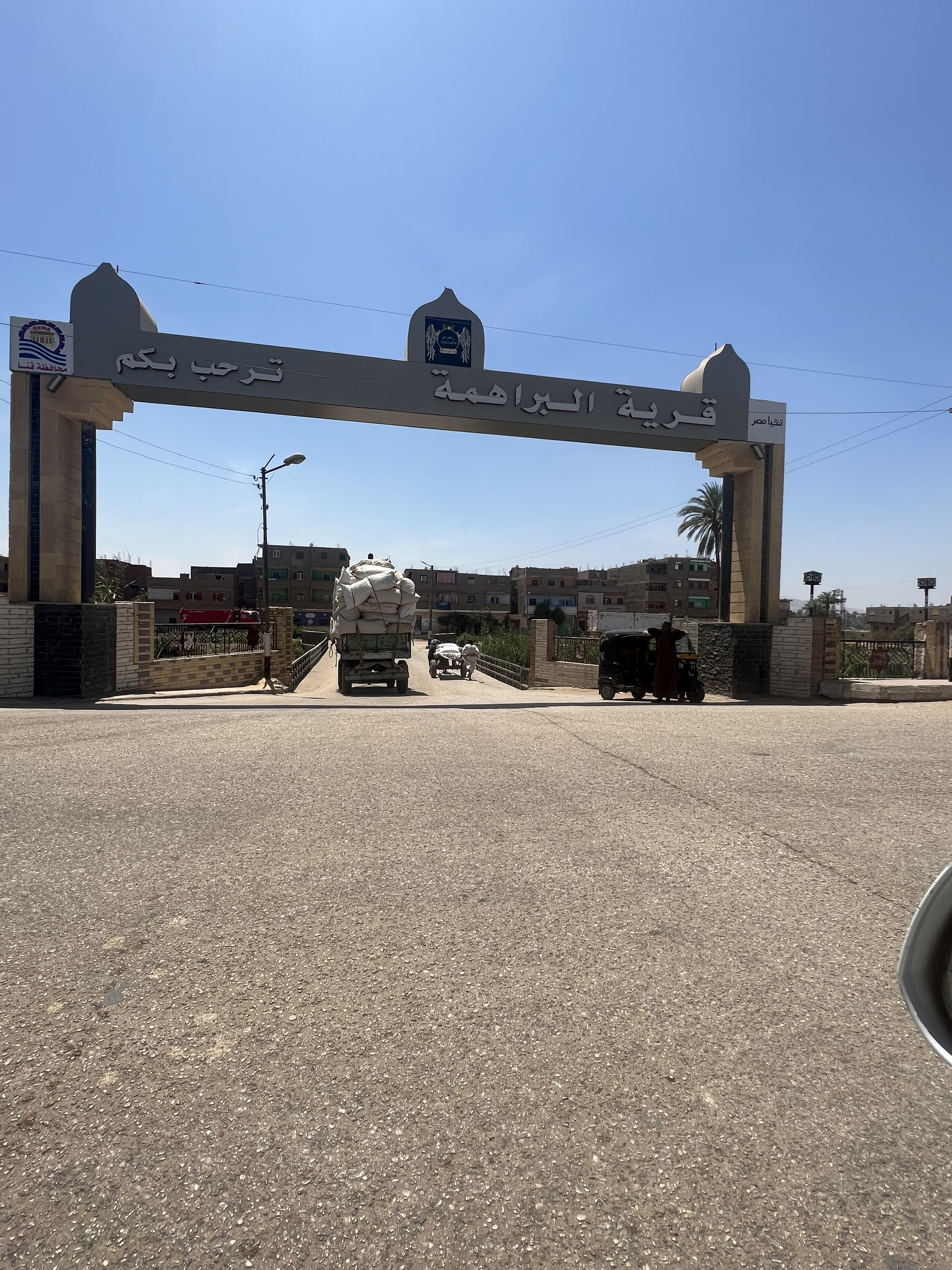
- Interactive map of Al Barahmah البراهمة
- Coordinates: 26°00′51″N 32°48′04″E
- Country: Egypt
- Governorate: Qena
- Markaz: Qift

Population (January 2023)
  - Total: 43,649
- Time zone: UTC+2 (EET)
  - Summer (DST): UTC+3 (EEST)
- Postal code: 83733

Al Barahmah (Arabic: البراهمة) is a village is located in Qena Governorate in Egypt, with a population of 43,649 people. There are 22,664 men and 20,985 women. It was the first village in Upper Egypt to publish a local newspaper.

== See also ==
- Dendera
- Al Mahrousa
- Al Ashraf Al Qibliya
- Al Ashraf Al Bahariya
