= Alshaykhia =

Village in Qena Governorate, Egypt

Ash Shaykhīyah الشيخية
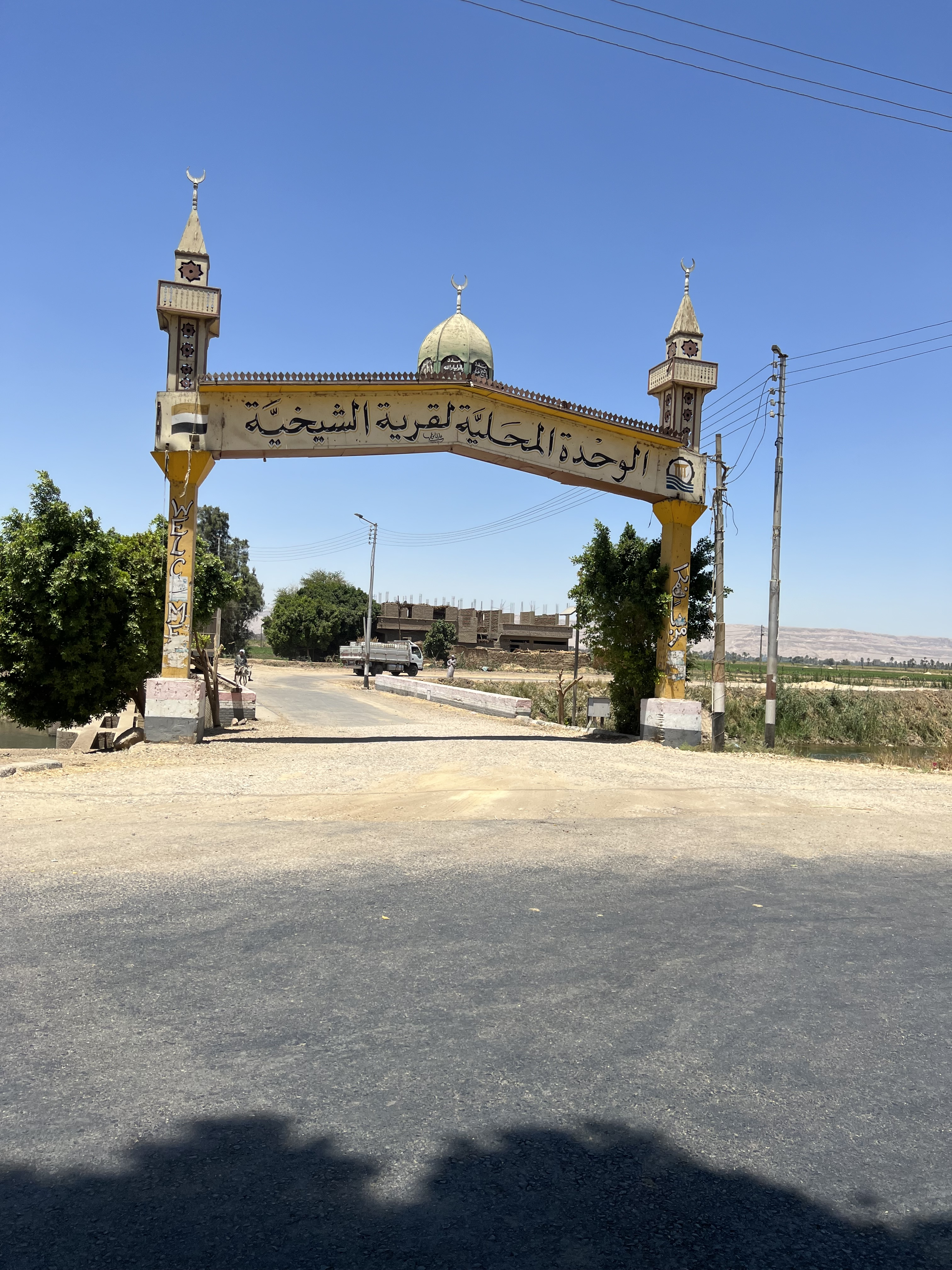
- Interactive map of Ash Shaykhīyah الشيخية
- Coordinates: 25°58′09″N 32°47′23″E
- Country: Egypt
- Seat: Qena (capital)

Area
  - Total: 1,211 km^{2} (468 sq mi)

Population (January 2023)
  - Total: 13,111
  - Density: 10.83/km^{2} (28.04/sq mi)
- Time zone: UTC+2 (EET)
  - Summer (DST): UTC+3 (EEST)
- Postal code: 83733

Alshaykhia (Arabic: الشيخية) is a village located in the center of Qift in Egypt, with a population of 13,111 people. There are 6,407 men and 6,704 women.

== See also ==
- Dendera
- Almahrousa
- Alashraf alqabaliaa
- Alashraf albahria
