= Alashraf alsharqia =

Governorate of Egypt

Al Ashrāf ash Sharqīyah الأشراف الشرقية
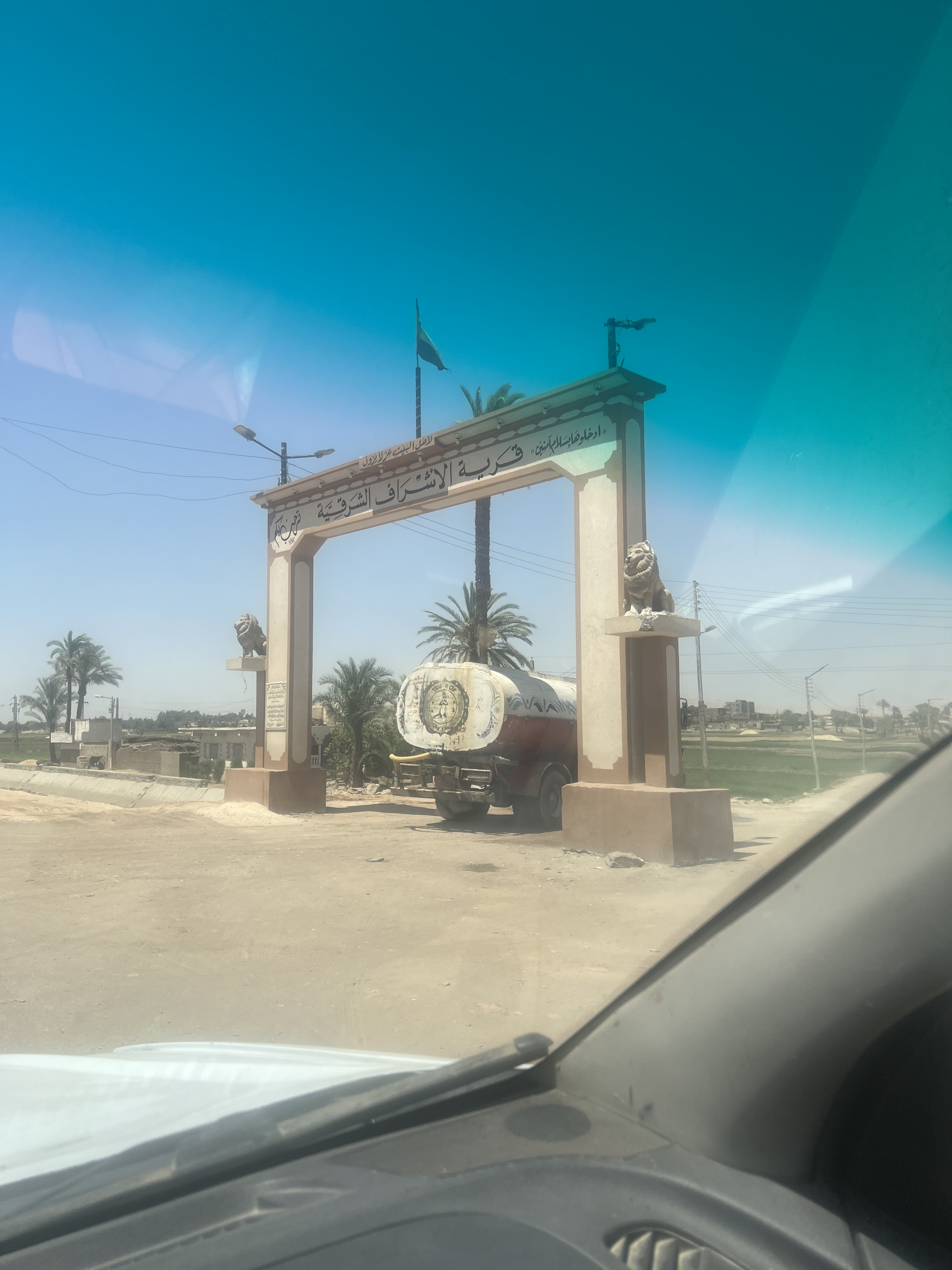
- Interactive map of Al Ashrāf ash Sharqīyah الأشراف الشرقية
- Coordinates: 26°06′21″N 32°47′37″E
- Country: Egypt
- Seat: Qena (capital)

Area
  - Total: 12,248 km^{2} (4,729 sq mi)

Population (January 2023)
  - Total: 11,200
  - Density: 0.914/km^{2} (2.37/sq mi)
- Time zone: UTC+2 (EET)
  - Summer (DST): UTC+3 (EEST)
- Postal code: 83733

Alashraf Alsharqia (Arabic: الأشراف الشرقية) is a village located in Qena Governorate, Egypt. The village has a population of 11,200 people, comprising 5,745 men and 5,455 women.

== See also ==
- Dendera
- Almahrousa
- Alashraf alqabalia
- Alashraf albahria
