= Ezbat AlBosah =

Village in Qena Governorate, Egypt

Ezbat AlBosah عزبة البوصة
- Village
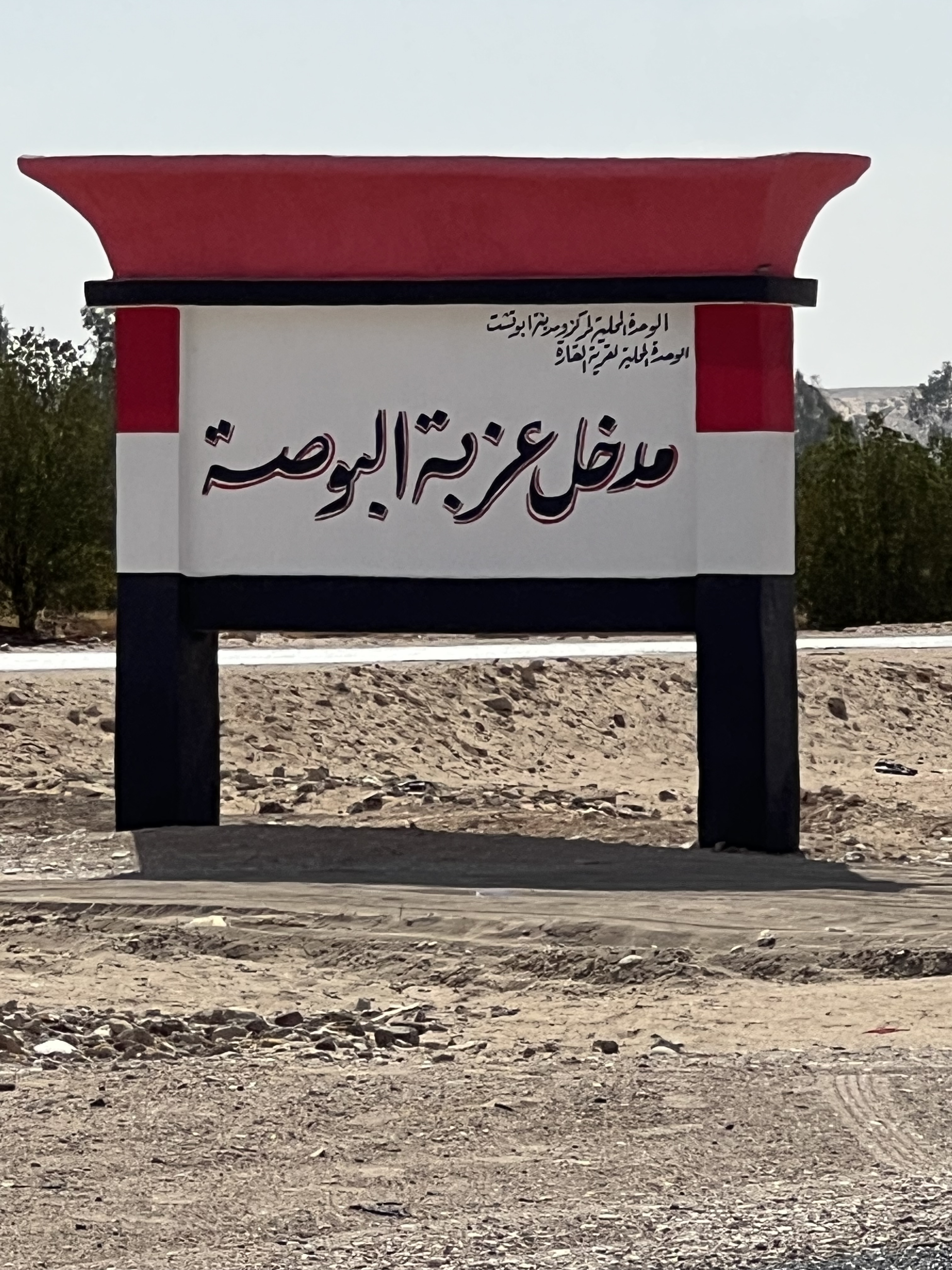

- Location within Egypt
- Coordinates: 26°05′39″N 32°18′35″E
- Country: Egypt
- Governorate: Qena
- Markaz: Abu Tesht

Area
  - Total: 1,971 km^{2} (761 sq mi)

Population (2023)
  - Total: 17,148
  - Density: 8.700/km^{2} (22.53/sq mi)
- Time zone: UTC+2 (EET)
  - Summer (DST): UTC+3 (EEST)

Ezbat AlBosah (Egyptian Arabic: عزبة البوصة) is a village in Markaz Abu Tesht in Qena Governorate in Egypt, with a population of 17,148 people, of whom 8,276 are men and 8,872 are women.

== See also ==
- List of cities and towns in Egypt
