= Garagos =

Garagos may refer to:

- Garagos, Egypt, a village
- Garagos, a deity in the Dungeons & Dragons roleplaying game

== See also ==
- Gargos, a character in the Killer Instinct video games
