= Al Qarah (Egypt) =

Al Qarah القارة
- Village
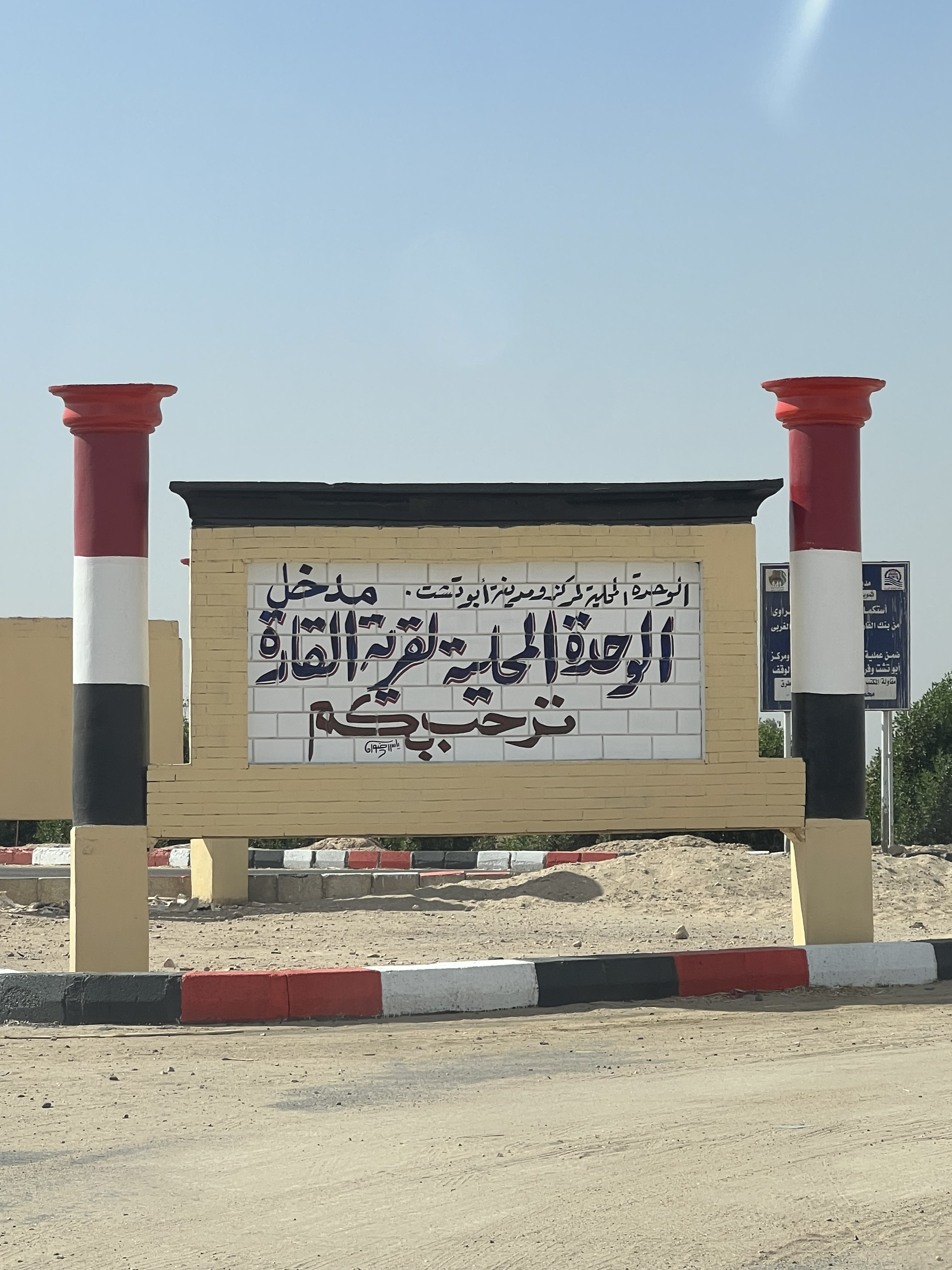

- Location within Egypt
- Coordinates: 26°04′50″N 32°03′38″E
- Country: Egypt
- Governorate: Qena
- Markaz: Abu Tesht

Area
  - Total: 23.76 km^{2} (9.17 sq mi)

Population (2023)
  - Total: 19,394
  - Density: 816.2/km^{2} (2,114/sq mi)
- Time zone: UTC+2 (EET)
  - Summer (DST): UTC+3 (EEST)

Al Qarah (Arabic: القارة) is a village in Markaz Abu Tisht in Qena Governorate in Egypt, with a population of 19,394 people, of whom 9,256 are men and 10,138 are women.

O1 Z1 U28 G1 U28 G1 D1 Z1 O49
pr ḏꜣḏꜣ
in hieroglyphs
Era: New Kingdom
(1550–1069 BC)

== See also ==
- List of cities and towns in Egypt
