= Dagi (Ancient Egyptian official) =

Local official from the First Intermediate Period, around 2100 BC

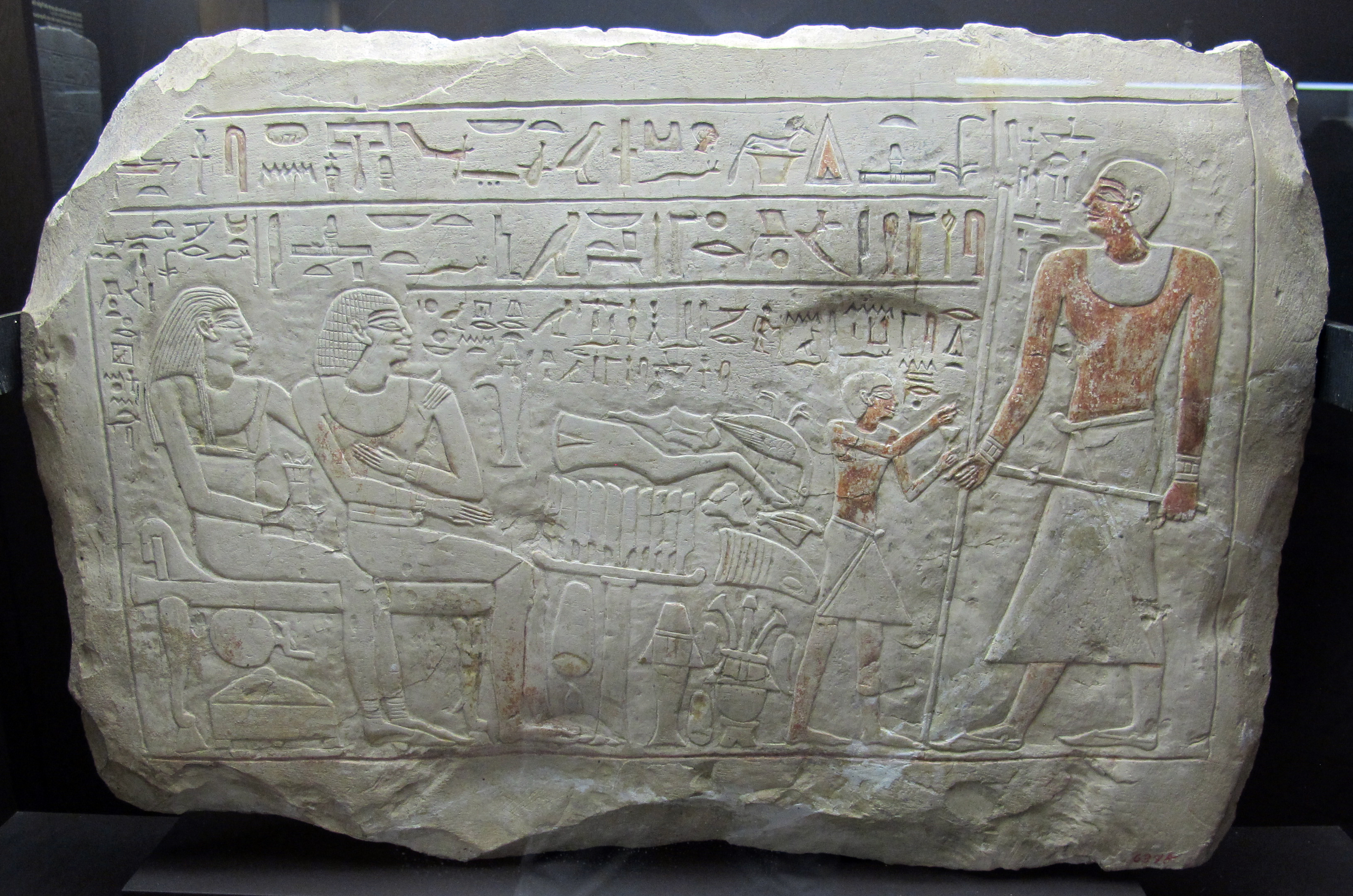
Stela of Hetepi

Dagi (fl. c. 2100 BC) was an ancient Egyptian local official who lived in the First Intermediate Period. From his preserved titles and objects it is very likely that he was local governor at Qus, a town in Upper Egypt. Dagi is mainly known from the stela of Hetepi, who was his father. On this stela, Dagi bears the titles sole friend and inspector of priests. Especially the latter title indicates that he was a main local authority at a certain place. From other sources it is known that these local priests also had responsibilities beyond religious matters. They were basically local governors. The stela of his father Hetepi is today in the National Archaeological Museum of Florence. It was bought by Ernesto Schiaparelli in 1884 or 1885. Later research has shown that the stela most likely comes from Naqada where there was a cemetery of the First Intermediate Period that served Qus. Dagi might be also mentioned on the stela of the overseer of clothes Hasi, who said that he served the overseer of priests Dagi. As the titles of both Dagis are slightly different, there is no hard evidence that they are identical.
