= Al-Waqf =

Al-Waqf may refer to:

- Al Waqf, Egypt, city
- Al-Waqf, Syria, village
- Al-Waqf, Yemen, village
