= Garagos, Egypt =

Place in Qena Governorate, Egypt

Garagos جراجوس Jarajus
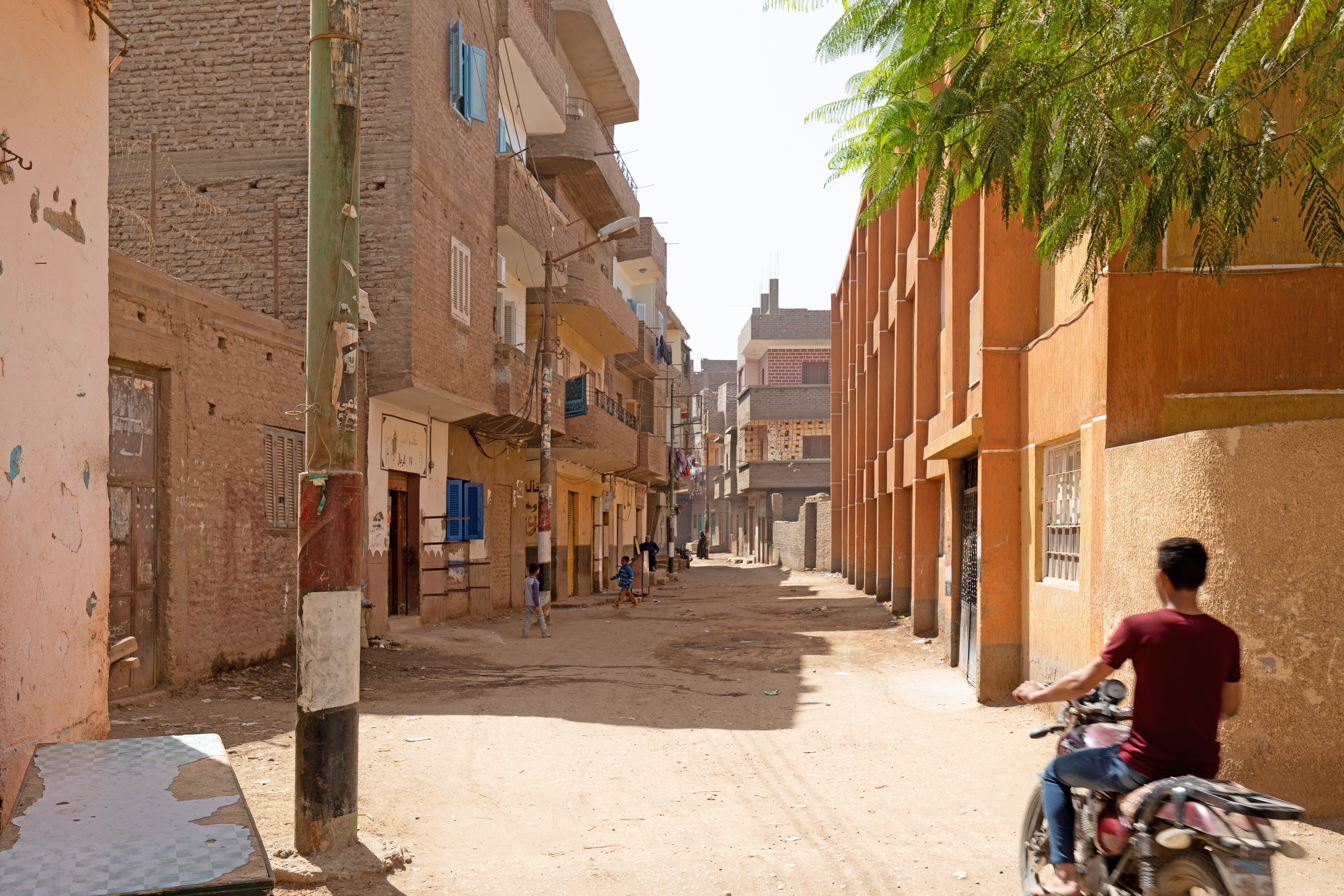
- Street in Garagos

- Location in Egypt
- Coordinates: 25°52′05.1″N 32°45′23.8″E
- Country: Egypt
- Governorate: Qena Governorate

Population (2006)
  - Total: 20,427
- Time zone: UTC+2 (EET)
  - Summer (DST): UTC+3 (EEST)

Garagos (Arabic: جراجوس) is a village in Qena Governorate in Egypt, which is famous for "Garagos Pottery".

The older name of the village is Jazirat Qaraqush (Arabic: جزيرة قراقش).

This village is the birthplace of Saint Verena.

== History ==
The village became a center for the development projects of the first Egyptian NGO, the Association of Haute-Égypte (Association of Upper Egypt), founded by Catholic missionaries including the Jesuits Stéphane de Montgolfier (1907–2000), Maurice de Fenoyl (1909–2004), and Philippe Ackermann (1914). The association founded a School in 1947. Later under the leadership of Ackermann the village established a pottery studio and installed its workshops in a Nubian-style domed mud-brick building built by the celebrated architect Hassan Fathy. They also founded a weaving studio for young women, which aimed to provide more opportunities for female development, under the supervision of Folla el-Masri (1919–2003), an Egyptian woman from Asyut. In the 1950s and '60s the village's artisanal workshops attracted French and Swiss tourists who visited nearby Luxor and offered a model for linking tourism to rural development.
