= Abu Tesht =

Abu Tesht Ⲡϫⲟϫ أبو تشت
- Town and Markaz
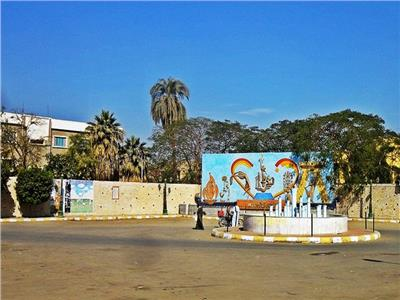

- Location within Egypt
- Coordinates: 26°07′06″N 32°05′43″E
- Country: Egypt
- Governorate: Qena

Area
  - Total: 256.0 km^{2} (98.8 sq mi)
  - Urban: 7.19 km^{2} (2.78 sq mi)
- Elevation: 68 m (223 ft)

Population (2023)
  - Total: 536,016
  - Density: 2,094/km^{2} (5,423/sq mi)
  - Urban: 19,030
  - Rural: 516,986
- Time zone: UTC+2 (EET)
  - Summer (DST): UTC+3 (EEST)

Abu Tesht or Abu Tisht (Arabic: أبو تشت; Coptic: Ⲡϫⲟϫ) is a town and markaz in Qena, Egypt. It is situated on the west bank of the Nile.

The markaz consists of 1 city which is Abu Tesht and 36 villages, biggest of them are Ezbat Al Bosah and Al Qarah.

O1 Z1 U28 G1 U28 G1 D1 Z1 O49
pr ḏꜣḏꜣ
in hieroglyphs
Era: New Kingdom
(1550–1069 BC)

== History ==
It is considered one of the oldest inhabited areas in Egypt as it includes the Naqada area which contain remains of prehistoric civilizations as Naqada culture. It is identified with the Ancient Egyptian city of Per-Djodj, although Daressy identifies the nearby town of Abu Shûsha as the actual Per-Djodj.

=== 2010 civil unrest ===
In November of 2010, security forces were dispatched to quell disturbances in the city after reports of a Muslim mob attacking damaging and looting homes and businesses owned by Coptic Christians.

== See also ==
- List of cities and towns in Egypt
