= Kainepolis, Egypt =

Coordinates: 26°09′36″N 32°43′07″E

Kainepolis or Caenepolis (Ancient Greek: Καινὴ πόλις), also called Caene or Kaine (Καινή), was a town of ancient Egypt. It was the southernmost town of the Panopolite nome in the Thebaid of Egypt. It stood upon the eastern bank of the Nile, 2 miles (3.2 km) northwest of Coptos. Herodotus mentions a town Neapolis (Νέη πόλις), near Chemmis in Upper Egypt, which is probably the same with Caenepolis. The town later bore the name Maximianopolis (Μαξιμιανοῦ Πόλις). Panopolis, which was north of Chemmis, at one period went by the name of Caene or Caenepolis.

Its site is located near the modern Qena.

According to the Notitia Dignitatum the town was the station of Ala III Dromedariorum (a Roman auxiliary unit consisting of Dromedarii).

== See also ==
- List of ancient Egyptian towns and cities
