= Hetepi (priest) =

Ancient Egyptian official of the First Intermediate Period, around 2200 BC

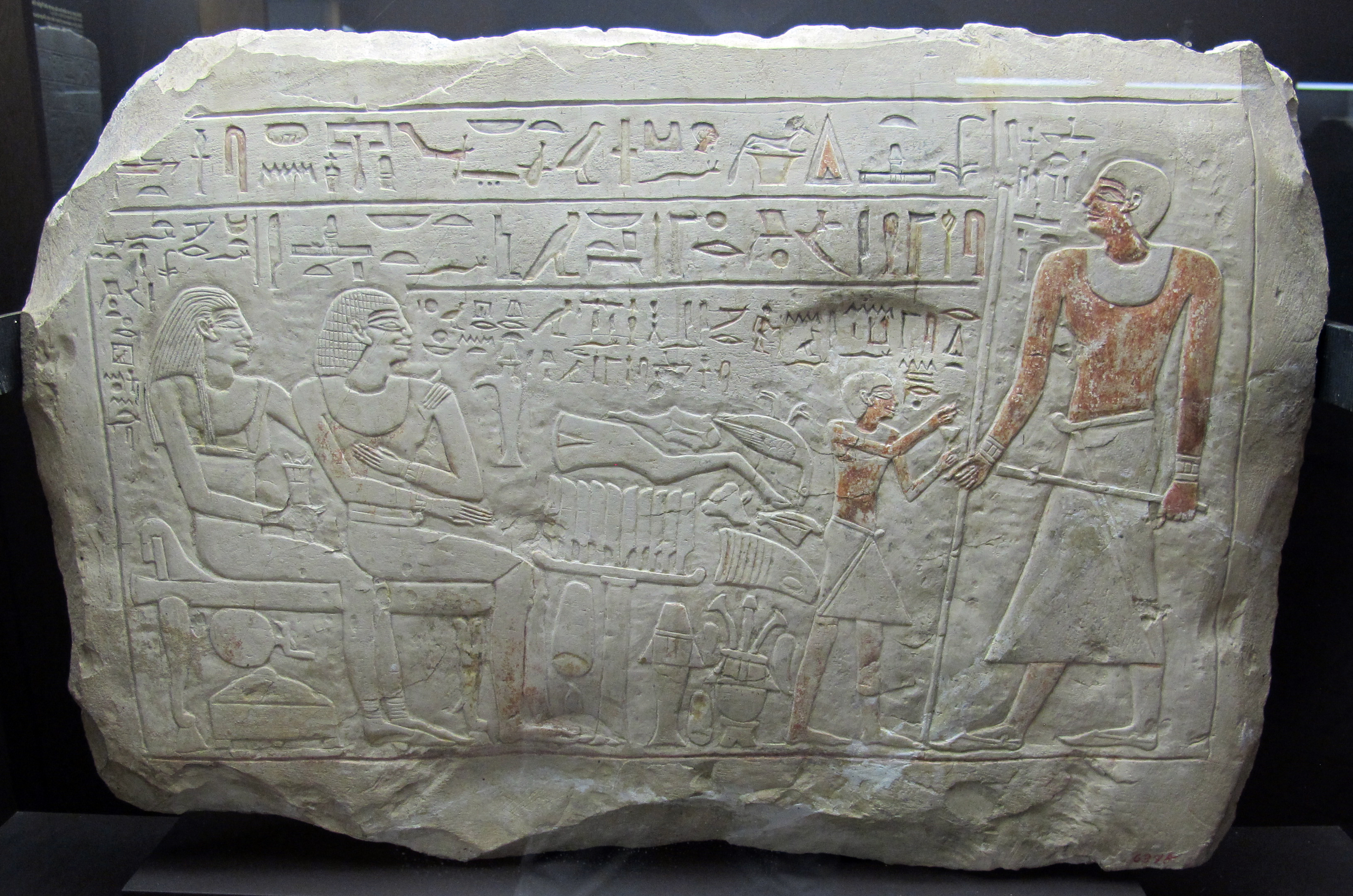
Stela of Hetepi

Hetepi (fl. c. 2200 BC) was an ancient Egyptian official of the First Intermediate Period. He is known from his stela that is now in the National Archaeological Museum of Florence. The stela was bought in 1884 or 1885 by Ernesto Schiaparelli. The original provenance was not known, but must come originally from Naqada, where there was a cemetery of the First Intermediate Period. Hetepi was sole friend and inspector of priests. From other sources it is known that these local inspectors of priests also had non-religious functions and were therefore the local governors of their towns. Henry George Fischer showed that the cemeteries near Naqada were those of Qus on the other side of the Nile. Hetepi was therefore governor of Qus. On the stela is also shown his son Dagi, who bears the same titles and who was most likely the successor in office.
