= El Waqf, Egypt =

El Waqf الوقف
- Town
- Location in Egypt
- Coordinates: 26.080761°N 32.424503°E
- Country: Egypt
- Governorate: Qena

Area
  - Total: 33.4 km^{2} (12.9 sq mi)
- Elevation: 57 m (187 ft)

Population (2023)
  - Total: 36,315
  - Density: 1,090/km^{2} (2,820/sq mi)
- Time zone: UTC+2 (EET)
  - Summer (DST): UTC+3 (EEST)

El Waqf (Arabic: الوقف) is a town and markaz in the Qena Governorate, Egypt. The former name of the city is al-Sanabisa (Arabic: السنابسة).

== See also ==
- List of cities and towns in Egypt
