= Farshut =

City in Egypt

Farshut فرشوط
- City
- Location in Egypt
- Coordinates: 26°03′18″N 32°09′50″E
- Country: Egypt
- Governorate: Qena

Area
  - Total: 82.12 km^{2} (31.71 sq mi)

Population (2021)
  - Total: 207,547
  - Density: 2,527/km^{2} (6,546/sq mi)
- Time zone: UTC+2 (EET)
  - Summer (DST): UTC+3 (EEST)

Farshut (Arabic: فرشوط, from Coptic: ⲧⲃⲉⲣϭⲱⲧ, lit. 'the pond') is a city in the Qena Governorate, Egypt. Its population was estimated at 70,000 people in 2020. The Markaz of Farshut has 177,836 people.
