= Qena =

Qena قنا
- City
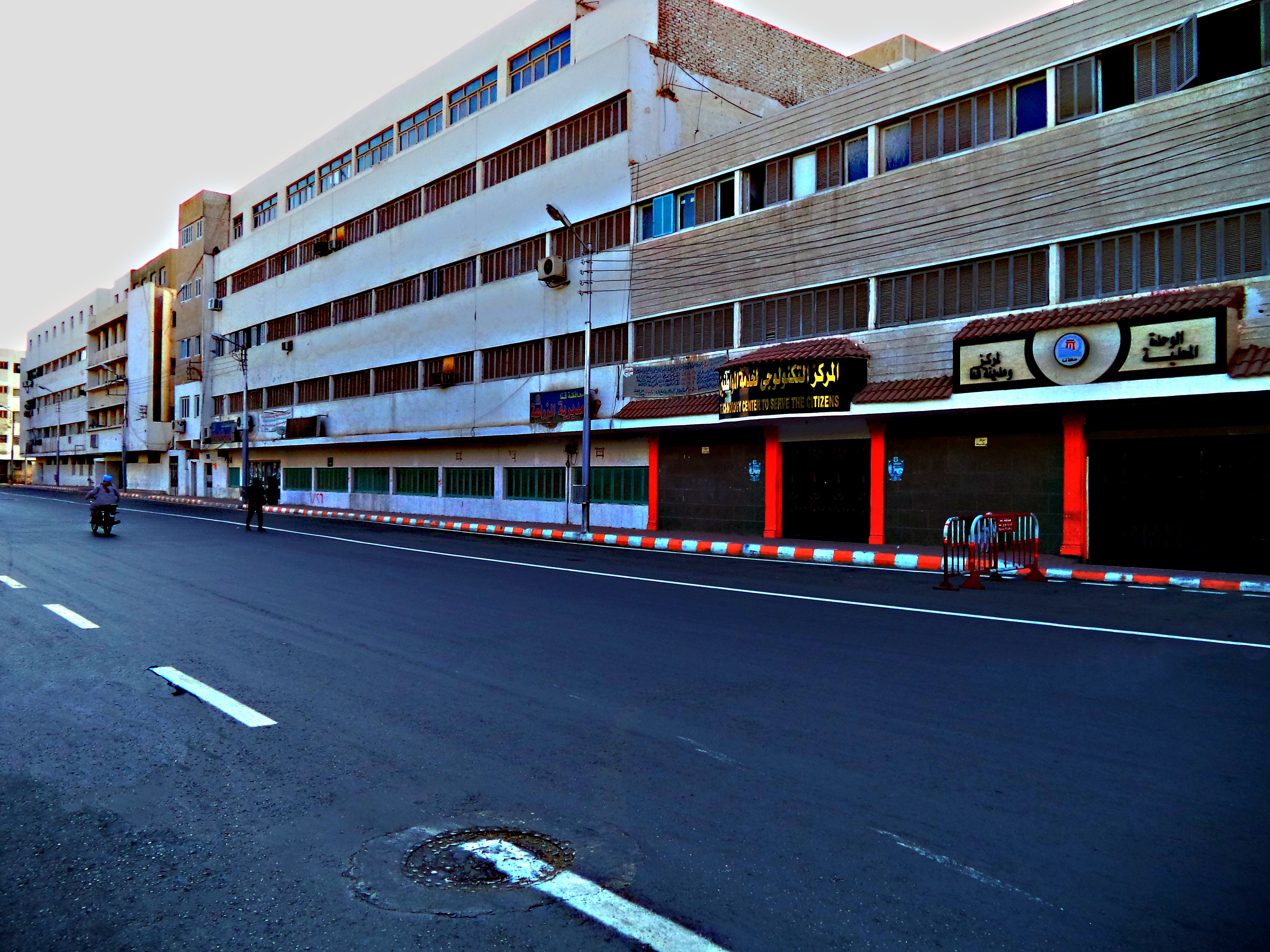

- Location within Egypt
- Coordinates: 26°10′12″N 32°43′38″E
- Country: Egypt
- Governorate: Qena

Area
  - Total: 31.60 km^{2} (12.20 sq mi)
- Elevation: 80 m (260 ft)

Population (2021)
  - Total: 252,883
  - Density: 8,003/km^{2} (20,730/sq mi)
- Time zone: UTC+2 (EET)
  - Summer (DST): UTC+3 (EEST)
- Area code: (+20) 96

M8 G1 D58 X1 M43
šꜣbt
in hieroglyphs

Qena (Arabic: قنا Qinā [ˈʔenæ], locally: [ˈɡena]) is a city in Upper Egypt, and the capital of the Qena Governorate. Situated on the east bank of the Nile, it was known in antiquity as Kaine (Greek Καινή, meaning "new (city)"; Latinized transliteration: Caene) and Maximianopolis. Gauthier identifies Qena with ancient Shabt.

== Overview ==
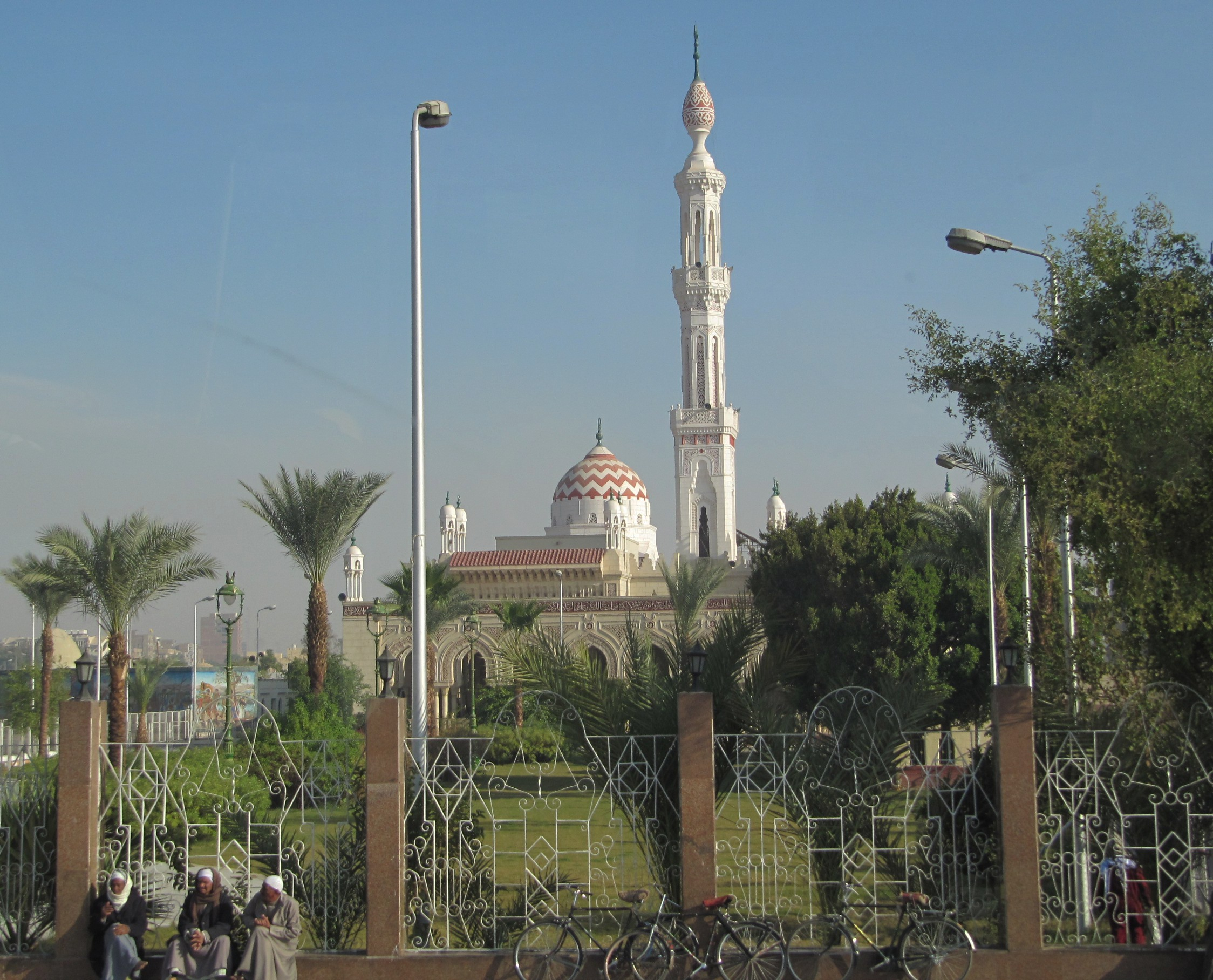
Qena Mosque

This provincial capital is located about 95 km from El Balyana and 63 km north of Luxor. It is most famous for its proximity to the ruins of Dendara. It owes its modern prosperity to the opening of the Wadi Qena towards the Red Sea, which is a major traffic route between Upper Egypt and the Red Sea. Tourists traveling between Luxor and the Red Sea will assuredly pass through this city since there is only one good road connection. Qena is noted for its pottery. Qena is also known for its beautiful huge mountains and green nature.

South Valley University has a campus in Qena.

Qena is a large market town on the River Nile situated next to the famous Greco-Roman temples of Dendera. Also on the Nile, Luxor is a long-time tourist hotspot that in large part attracts hundreds of thousands of visitors because of its temples, tombs and location on the site of the ancient capital of Thebes. Ancient Thebes is now a UNESCO World Heritage site.

Qena has one of the highest concentration of Coptic Christians in Egypt (approximately 35% of the total population).

== History ==
In addition to its Ancient Egyptian heritage as the city of Caenepolis, Qena has a considerable Islamic heritage and many unique architectural mosques. Qena has witnessed major restorations, and came third in the UNESCO City Beauty contest.

== Climate ==
Qena has a hot desert climate (BWh) according to Köppen climate classification, with very hot summers and very little precipitation year round. Winters are warm at days, but become cool at nights. The hottest months on average are equally July and August, while the coolest month is January. Luxor, Minya, Qena and Asyut have the widest difference of temperatures between days and nights of any city in Egypt, with almost 16 °C (29 °F) difference.

The hottest temperature recorded was on May 15, 1991 which was 50 °C (122 °F) and the coldest temperature was on January 6, 1989 which was −1 °C (30 °F).

Climate data for Qena
Month	Jan	Feb	Mar	Apr	May	Jun	Jul	Aug	Sep	Oct	Nov	Dec	Year
Mean daily maximum °C (°F)	22.7 (72.9)	25.3 (77.5)	30.5 (86.9)	35.3 (95.5)	38.8 (101.8)	41.0 (105.8)	41.0 (105.8)	40.7 (105.3)	38.1 (100.6)	35.1 (95.2)	30.1 (86.2)	24.4 (75.9)	33.6 (92.5)
Daily mean °C (°F)	13.2 (55.8)	15.0 (59.0)	19.4 (66.9)	24.6 (76.3)	29.8 (85.6)	31.7 (89.1)	32.0 (89.6)	32.1 (89.8)	29.1 (84.4)	26.0 (78.8)	20.3 (68.5)	15.0 (59.0)	24.0 (75.2)
Mean daily minimum °C (°F)	6.9 (44.4)	7.8 (46.0)	11.4 (52.5)	16.1 (61.0)	20.8 (69.4)	23.2 (73.8)	24.1 (75.4)	24.2 (75.6)	22.0 (71.6)	18.8 (65.8)	13.6 (56.5)	8.9 (48.0)	16.5 (61.7)
Average rainfall mm (inches)	1 (0.0)	0 (0)	0 (0)	0 (0)	0 (0)	0 (0)	0 (0)	0 (0)	0 (0)	0 (0)	1 (0.0)	1 (0.0)	3 (0)
Average relative humidity (%)	63	56	44	31	27	28	31	32	44	53	59	63	44
Source: Arab Meteorology Book

== Transportation ==
Qena has a network of streets, roads and highways with greenery and flowered pavements. From the city there is a road that crosses the Eastern Desert to port Safaga on the Red Sea.

The United States Air Force conducted classified operations from Wadi Qena airfield from the 1970s to the 1990s, under the code names Coronet Scabbard (Facebook group under same name), Coronet Aspen, Coronet Drake, and Coronet Mallard. The 4401st Combat Support Squadron (Provisional) maintained a near-constant CENTAF presence there. Part of these operations probably included Lockheed MC-130 flights during the Desert One rescue attempts for the U.S. hostages in Tehran in the late 1970s.

== See also ==
- List of cities and towns in Egypt
- Dendera
- Luxor
- Maximianopolis (disambiguation)
