= Qus =

Qus قوص
- City
- Location in Egypt
- Coordinates: 25°56′N 32°46′E
- Country: Egypt
- Governorate: Qena Governorate

Area
  - Total: 83.1 sq mi (215.1 km^{2})

Population (2021)
  - Total: 512,827
  - Density: 6,175/sq mi (2,384/km^{2})
- Time zone: UTC+2 (EST)
  - Summer (DST): +3

Qus (Arabic: قوص, older name Arabic: قوص واروير, romanized: qus warwir, from Coptic: ⲕⲱⲥ ⲃⲉⲣⲃⲓⲣ) is a city in the modern Qena Governorate, Egypt, located on the east bank of the Nile.

== History ==
=== Naming ===
W11 S29 Aa17 G1 O49 or V33 S29 Aa17 G1 O49
gsꜣ or qsꜣ
in hieroglyphs

Its modern name is one of many borrowings in Egyptian Arabic from Coptic, the last living phase of Ancient Egyptian. In Graeco-Roman times, it was called Apollonopolis Parva or Apollinopolis Mikra (Greek: Ἀπόλλωνος ἡ μικρά; Ἀπόλλων μικρός), or Apollonos minoris.

During the Roman Empire it was renamed Diocletianopolis; and it corresponds, probably, to the Maximianopolis of the later Empire.

=== Overview ===
In the late Old Kingdom and First Intermediate Period, important people of Qus were buried at Naqada at the other side of the Nile. Here were found several stelae belonging to local governors of Qus, including those of Hetepi (priest). Gesa was an important city in the early part of Egyptian history. Because at that time it served as the point of departure for expeditions to the Red Sea. The city gradually lost its importance, only to regain it in the 13th century with the opening of an alternate commercial route to the Red Sea. Since then, Qus replaced Qift as the primary commercial center for trading with Africa, India, and Arabia. It thus became the second most important Islamic city in medieval Egypt, after Cairo.

The census of 2017 recorded a population in Qus of 464,288, which was estimated to have increased to 512,827 in 2021.

== Main sights ==
=== Temple of Haroeris and Heqet ===
The temple of Haroeris (Horus) and Heqet was built during the Ptolemaic Period. Nowadays, only two ruined pylons of the temple remain. It is located at 25°54′57″N 32°45′51″E.

The pylon shows scenes of Ptolemy X Alexander I harpooning hippopotami, presenting offerings to Horus, and offering crowns to both Horus and Heqet. The texts also include the cartouches of Ptolemy IX Soter II(called Lathyros) and his mother Cleopatra III. Near this site a green basalt naos was discovered. It was dedicated to Horus by Ptolemy II Philadelphus. The naos is presumed to have come from the temple as well. (Note: The numbering of the Ptolemaic rulers can differ in several sources. The numbering used by Porter and Moss seems to be off by 1 compared to Wikipedia. The internal links are based on the second name used. For instance Ptolemy Alexander I is numbered Ptolemy X on Wikipedia, while he is numbered Ptolemy XI in Porter and Moss.)

== Economy ==
- Qus Sugar Factory.

== Bibliogrophy ==
- Bey Kamal, Ahmed (1903). "Le pylône de Qous". Annales du Service des Antiquités de l'Égypte, 3, pp. 215–235.
- Garcin, Jean-Claude (1976). Un centre musulman de la Haute-Égypte médiévale: Qûs. Textes arabes et études islamiques 6. Cairo: Institut français d'archéologie orientale.
- Garcin, Jean-Claude (1970). "Remarques sur un plan topographique de la grande mosquée de Qūs". Annales Islamologiques, 9.
- Makris, Dimitri (1999). "Qus". In Kathryn A. Bard (ed.), Encyclopedia of the Archaeology of Ancient Egypt, pp. 657–658. London and New York: Routledge.
- Tillier, Anaïs (2013). "Enquête sur le nom et les graphies de l'ancienne Gsy (Qous)". Bulletin de l'Institut français d'archéologie orientale, 113, pp. 433–447.
- Tillier, Anaïs (2014). "Le lieu de naissance des enfants de Nout". Chronique d'Égypte, 89(177), pp. 51–70.
- Lane, Edward William (1836). An Account of the Manners and Customs of the Modern Egyptians. London: Charles Knight. Useful for historical descriptions of Egyptian towns and society, although not a specialist archaeological study.

== See also ==
- List of cities and towns in Egypt
