= Alashraf albahria =

Settlement in Qena Governorate, Egypt

Al Ashrāf al Baḩrīyah الأشراف البحرية
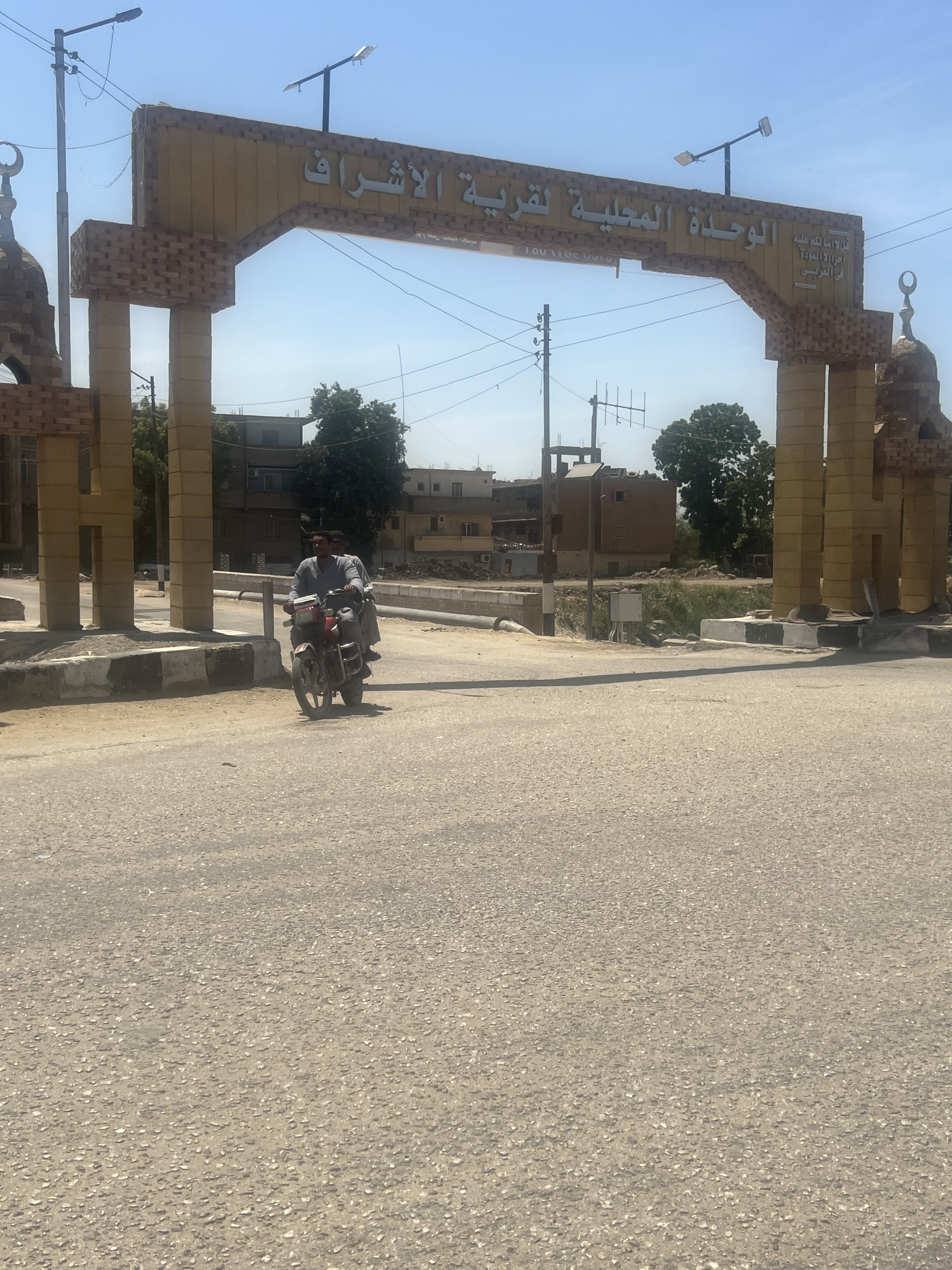
- Interactive map of Al Ashrāf al Baḩrīyah الأشراف البحرية
- Coordinates: 26°08′28″N 32°39′47″E
- Country: Egypt
- Seat: Qena (capital)

Area
  - Total: 8,115 km^{2} (3,133 sq mi)

Population (January 2023)
  - Total: 12,561
  - Density: 1.548/km^{2} (4.009/sq mi)
- Time zone: UTC+2 (EET)
  - Summer (DST): UTC+3 (EEST)
- Postal code: 83733

Al Ashrāf al Baḩrīyah (Arabic: الأشراف البحرية) is a village is located in Qena Governorate in Egypt, with a population of 12,561 people as of 2023. There are 6,541 men and 6,020 women.

== See also ==
- Almahrousa
- Alashraf alqabalia
- Dendera
