= Alashraf alqabalia =

Governorate of Egypt

Al-Ashraf Al-Qibliya الأشراف القبلية
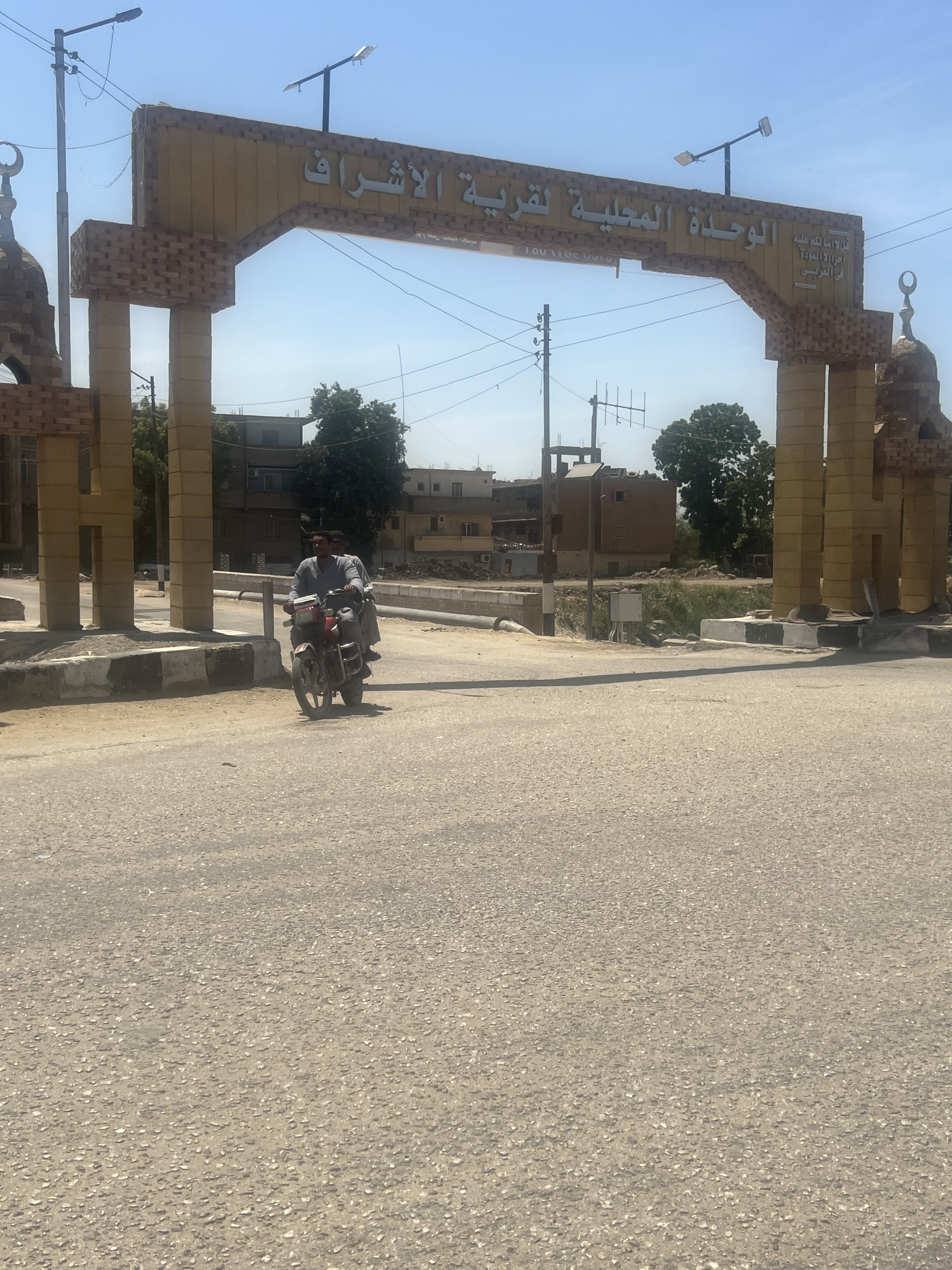
- Interactive map of Al-Ashraf Al-Qibliya الأشراف القبلية
- Coordinates: 26°01′15″N 32°45′58″E
- Country: Egypt
- Seat: Qena (capital)

Area
  - Total: 8,115 km^{2} (3,133 sq mi)

Population (January 2023)
  - Total: 14,865
  - Density: 1.832/km^{2} (4.744/sq mi)
- Time zone: UTC+2 (EET)
  - Summer (DST): UTC+3 (EEST)
- Postal code: 83733

Al-Ashraf Al-Qibliya is a village located in Qena Governorate in Egypt, with a population of 14,865 people. The number of men reached 7,643 men and the number of women 7,222.

== See also ==
- Dendera
