= Almahrousa =

Village in Egypt

Al Mahrousa المحروسه
- Village
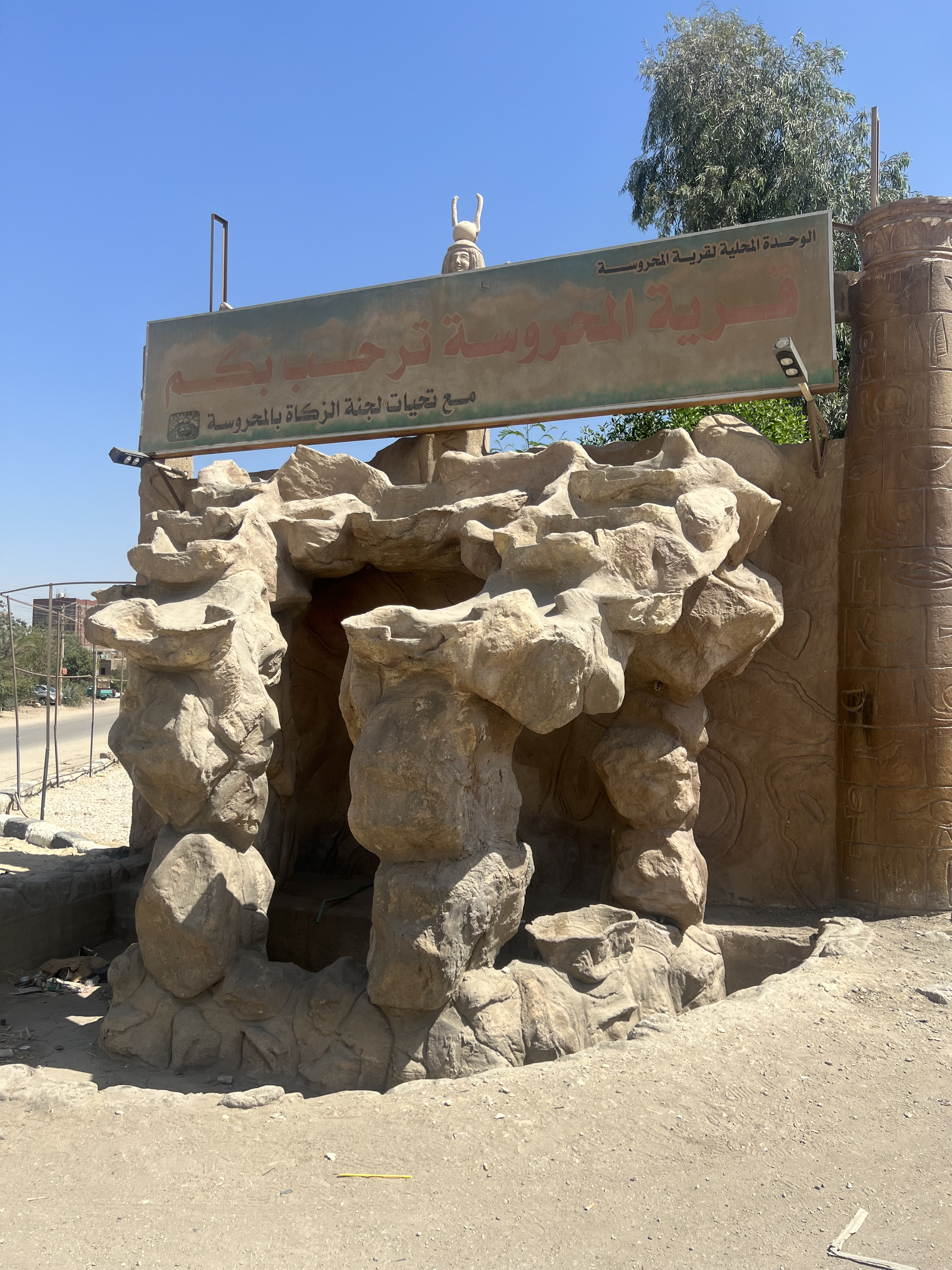
- Interactive map of Al Mahrousa
- Coordinates: 26°00′31″N 32°47′10″E
- Country: Egypt
- Governorate: Qena
- Markaz: Qena

Population (January 2023)
  - Total: 39,875
- Time zone: UTC+2 (EET)
  - Summer (DST): UTC+3 (EEST)

Al Mahrousa (Egyptian Arabic: المحروسه) is a village within the Qena Governorate in Egypt with a population of 39,875 people. The number of men is 21,622 and the number of women is 18,253.

== See also ==
- Dendera
