= Qena Governorate =

Governorate of Egypt

Qena Governorate محافظة قنا
- Governorate
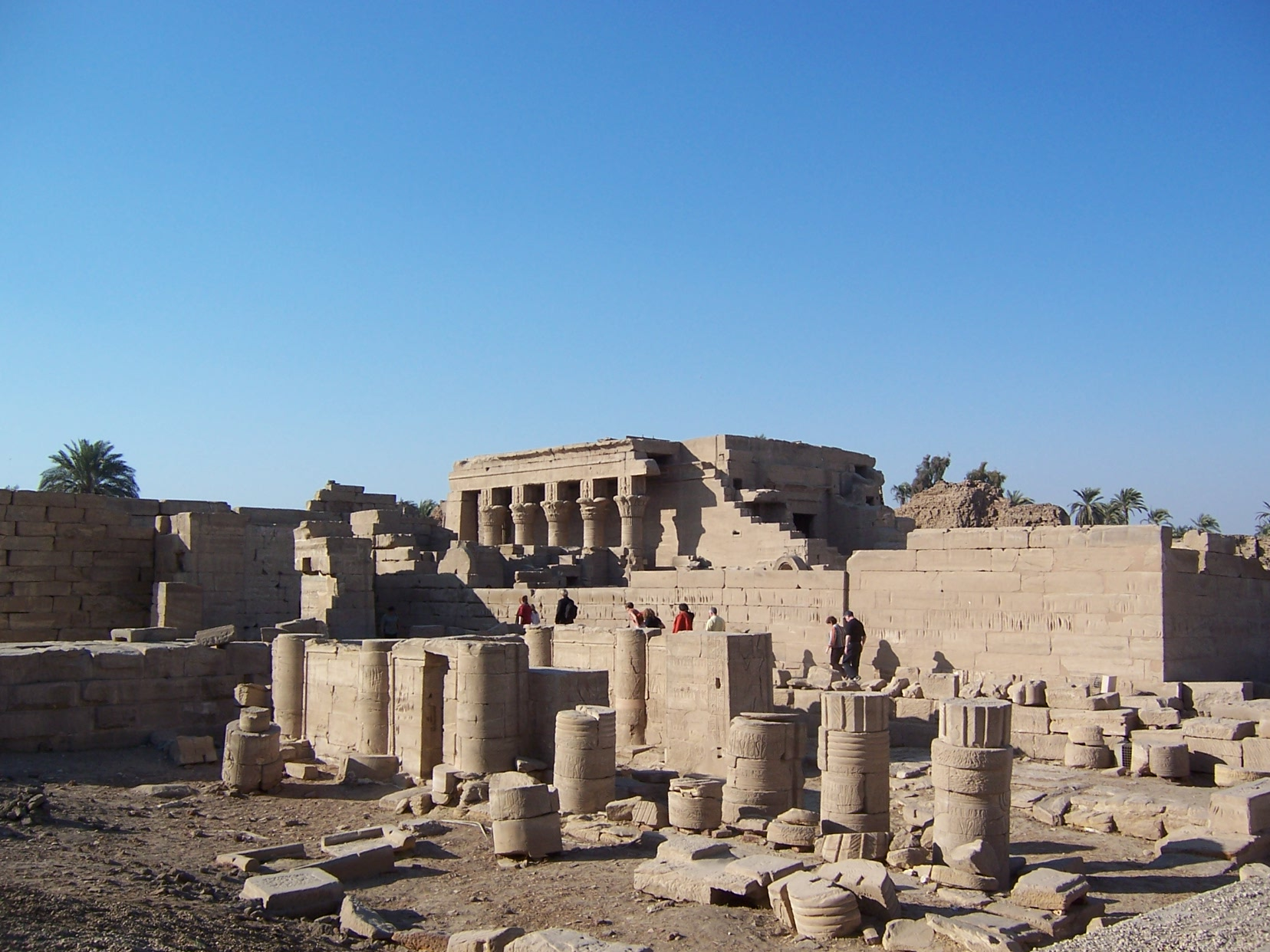
- Dendera Hathor Temple Complex in Dendera, 2007

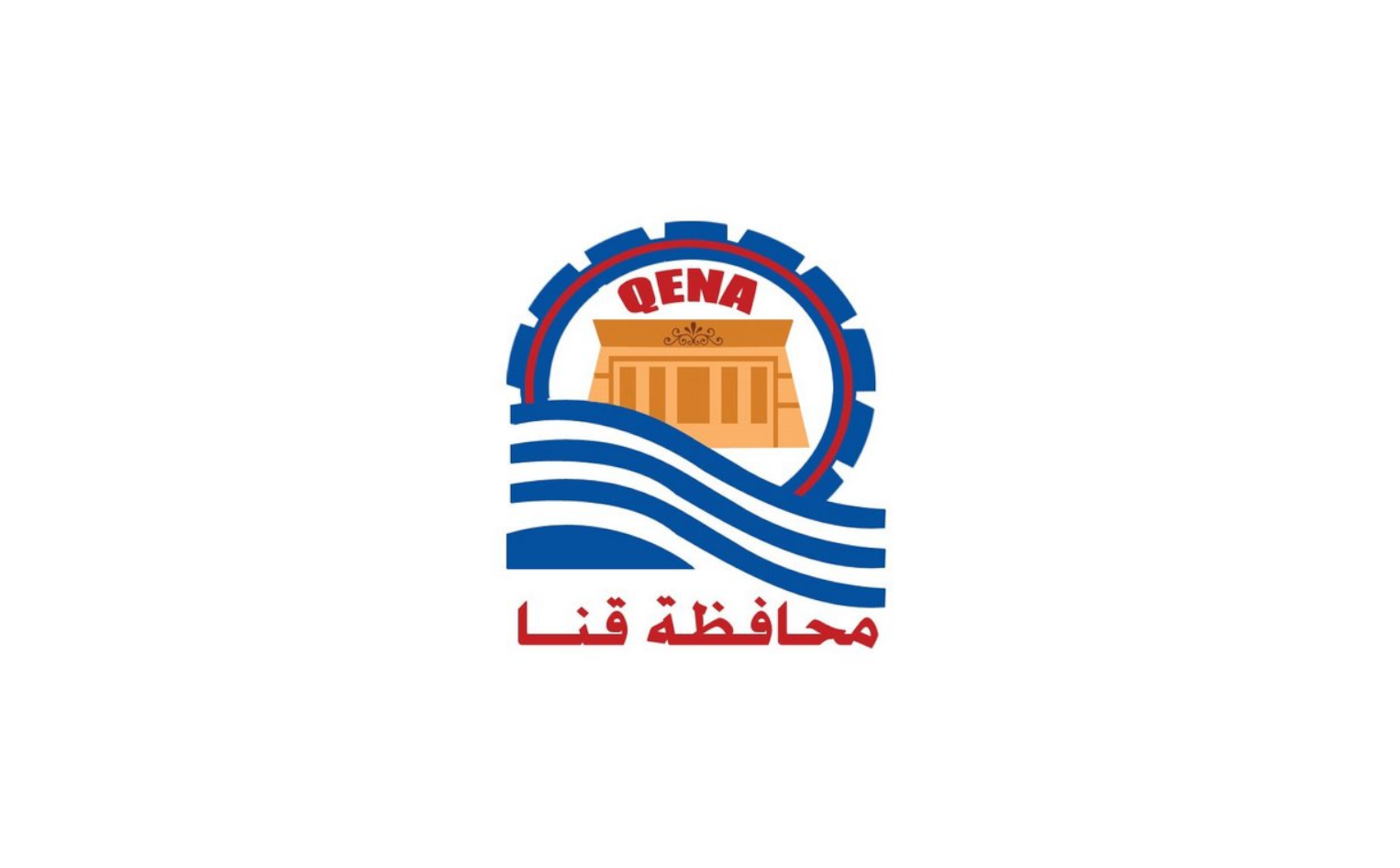
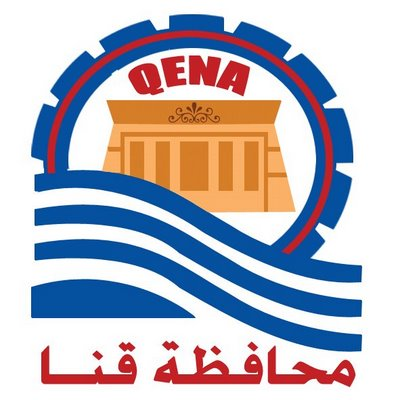
- Flag

- Qena Governorate on the map of Egypt
- Coordinates: 26.209°N 32.768°E
- Country: Egypt
- Seat: Qena (capital)

Government
  - Governor: Khalid Mahmoud Abd el-Halim Abd el-Aal

Area
  - Total: 9,565 km^{2} (3,693 sq mi)

Population (June 2024)
  - Total: 3,705,404
  - Density: 387.4/km^{2} (1,003/sq mi)

GDP
  - Total: EGP 80 billion (US$5.1 billion)
- Time zone: UTC+2 (EGY)
  - Summer (DST): UTC+3 (EEST)
- HDI (2021): 0.708 high · 17th
- Website: www.qena.gov.eg

Qena (Arabic: محافظة قنا) is one of the governorates of Egypt. It is located in Upper Egypt, the southern part of the country. It covers a stretch of the Nile valley. Its capital is the city of Qena.

== Overview ==
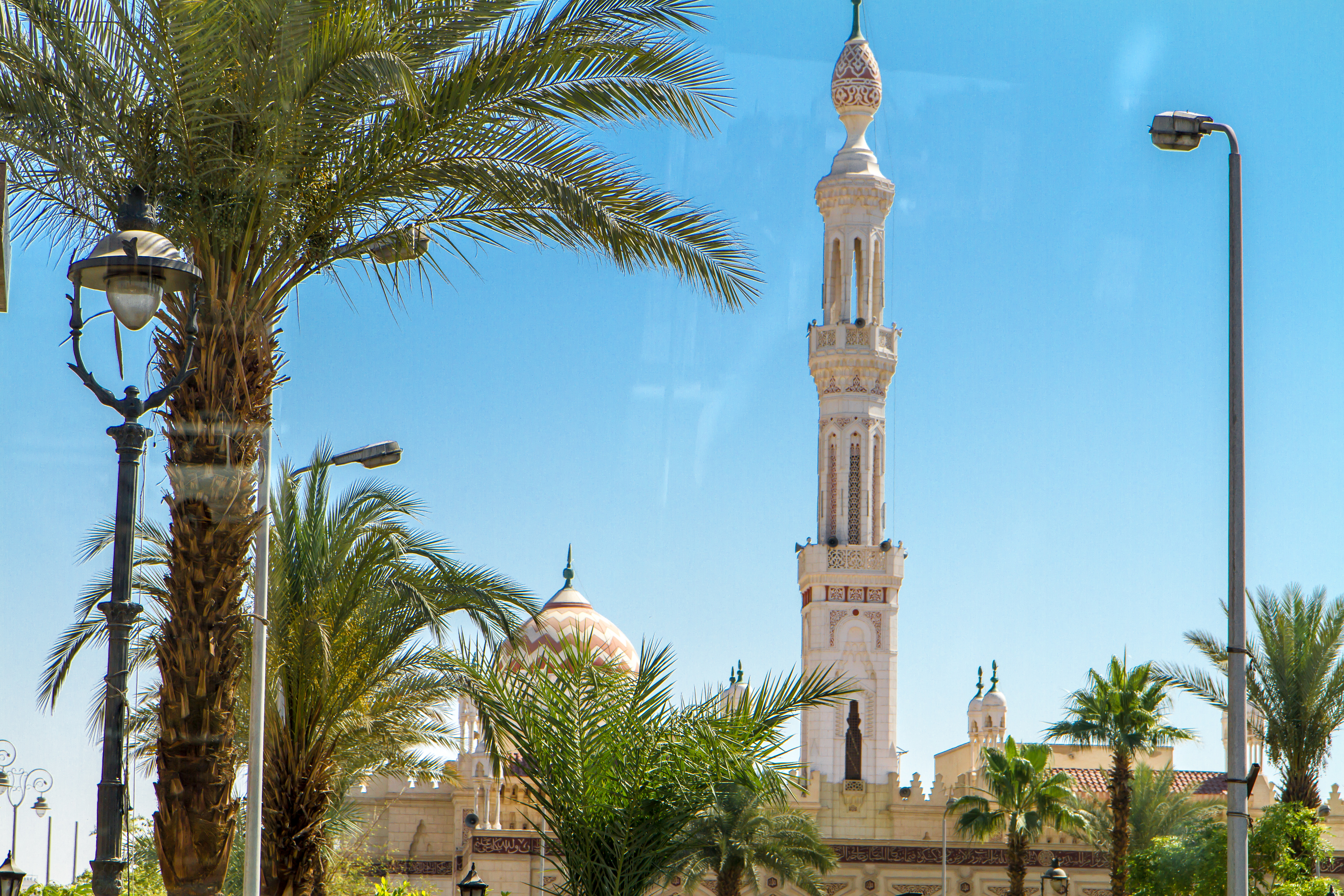
Sidi Abd Er-Rahim Mosque in Qena

The rate of poverty is more than 60% in this governorate but recently some social safety networks have been provided in the form of financial assistance and job opportunities. The funding has been coordinated by the country's Ministry of Finance and with assistance from international organizations.

Haya Karima, an Egyptian initiative endorsed by Abdel Fatah El-Sisi has implemented 690 projects in Qena Governorate. The projects include: projects in the sanitation sectors, drinking water sector, electricity sector, in the health field, in the field of youth and sports, agricultural projects, projects for service complexes and projects in the road sector.

== Municipal divisions ==
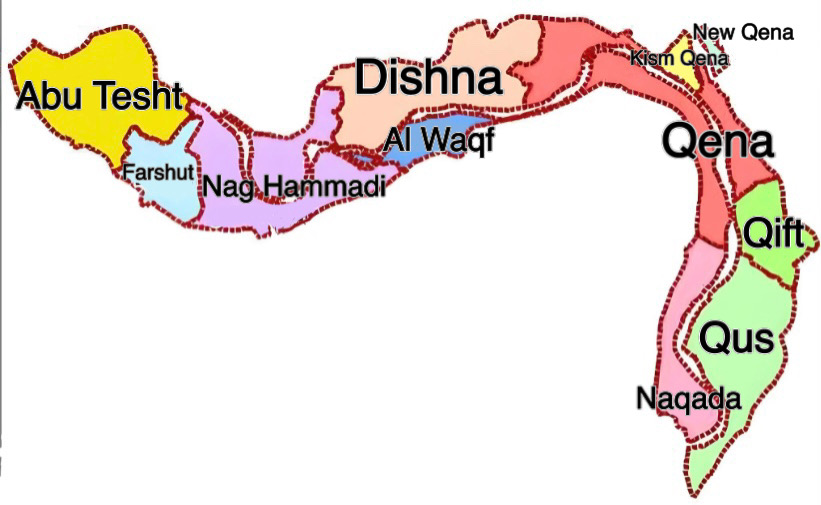
Map of Qena governorate municipal divisions

The governorate is divided into municipal divisions with a total estimated population as of January 2024 of 3,705,404. In the case of Qena governorate, there is one kism, a number of marakiz and 1 new city. Sometimes a markaz and a kism share a name.

Municipal Divisions
Anglicized name	Native name	Arabic transliteration	Population (January 2023 Est.)	Type
Abu Tesht	مركز أبوتشت	Abū Tisht	530,798	Markaz
Dishna	مركز دشنا	Dishnā	443,079	Markaz
El Waqf	مركز الوقف	Al-Waqf	92,142	Markaz
Farshut	مركز فرشوط	Farshūṭ	214,387	Markaz
Nag Hammadi	مركز نجع حمادى	Naj' Ḥammādī	660,690	Markaz
Naqada	مركز نقادة	Naqādah	171,910	Markaz
New Qena	مدينة قنا الجديدة	Madīnat Qinā al-Jadīdah	1,699	New City
Qena	قسم قنا	Qinā	261,945	Kism (fully urban)
Qena	مركز قنا	Qinā	513,968	Markaz
Qift (Gebtu/Coptos)	مركز قفط	Qifṭ	162,438	Markaz
Qus	مركز قوص	Qūṣ	466,855	Markaz

== Population ==
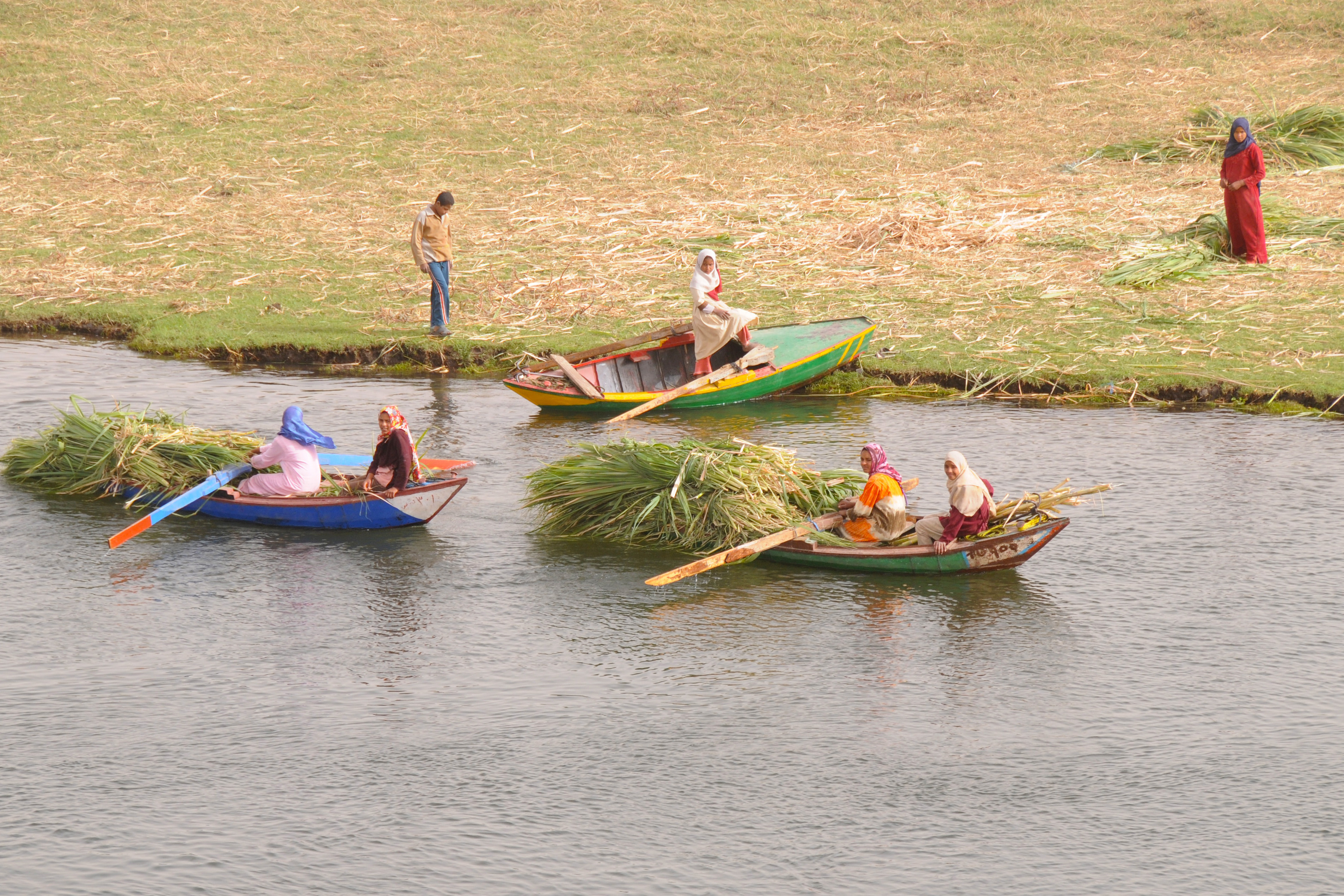
Farmers on the Nile near Qus

Historical population
Year	Pop.	±%
1937	1,017,569	—
1947	1,106,302	+8.7%
1957	1,219,000	+10.2%
1966	1,471,000	+20.7%
1976	1,705,594	+15.9%
1986	2,252,315	+32.1%
1996	2,027,603	−10.0%
2006	2,499,964	+23.3%
2015	3,045,504	+21.8%
2017E	3,181,688	+4.5%
2018E	3,224,000	+1.3%
2023E	3,605,518	+11.8%

According to population estimates from 2015 the majority of residents in the governorate lived in rural areas, with an urbanization rate of only 19.7%. Out of an estimated 3,045,504 people residing in the governorate, 2,445,051 people lived in rural areas as opposed to only 600,453 in urban areas.

According to population estimates from 2024 the majority of residents in the governorate live in rural areas, with an urbanization rate of only 18.7%. Out of an estimated 3,705,404 people residing in the governorate, 3,012,493 people live in rural areas as opposed to only 692,911 in urban areas.

== Cities and towns ==
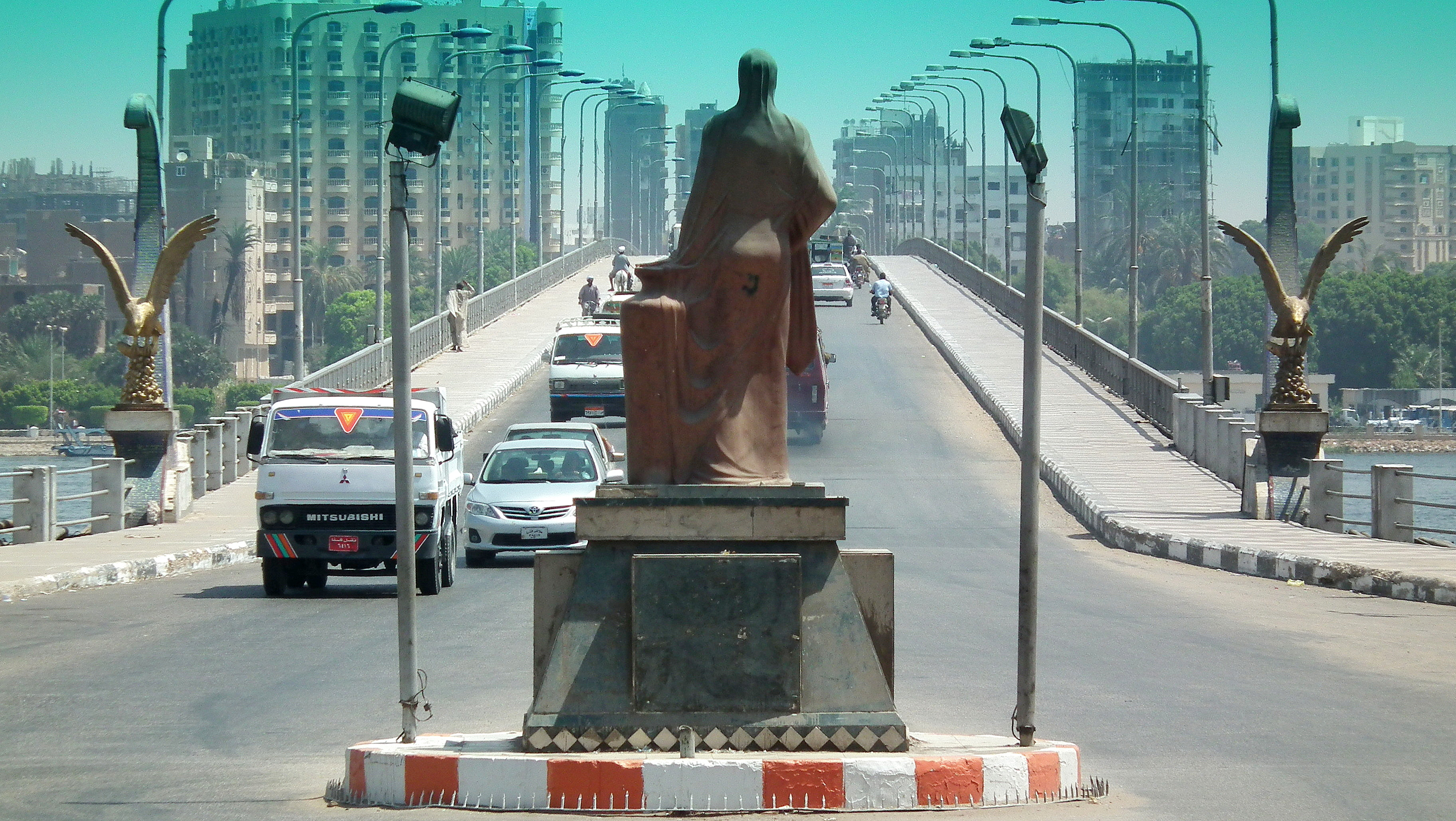
View of Qena from the Dendera bridge

As of 2018, nine cities (or towns) in Qena had a population of over 15,000 inhabitants.

City or Town	Native name	Arabic Name	Nov. 1996 Census	Nov. 2006 Census	July 2017 Pop. Est.
Abu Tesht	أبو تشت	Abū Tisht	10,469	13,015	17,022
Dishna	دشنا	Dishnā	44,125	52,534	60,585
El Waqf	الوقف	Al-Waqf	24,033	27,525	32,495
Farshut	فرشوط	Farshūṭ	43,796	51,052	66,447
Nag Hammadi	نجع حمادى	Naj' Ḥammādī	33,252	45,038	55,767
Naqada	نقادة	Naqādah	18,905	21,530	25,050
Qena	قنا	Qinā	155,382	201,191	236,624
Qift	قفط	Qifṭ	17,918	22,063	22,465
Qus	قوص	Qūṣ	49,054	60,068	78,959

== Industrial zones ==
According to the Governing Authority for Investment and Free Zones (GAFI), the following industrial zones are located in Qena:

Zone name
El Kalaheen Industrial Zone
Hou Industrial Zone

== Projects and programs ==
In 1981, the Basic Village Service Program (BVS) had several water, road and other projects going on in several marakiz in the Qena Governorate.

In 2016, Switzerland committed to funding a solid waste management program in Qena, a project with the Egyptian Ministry of Environment that will conclude in 2021. The National Solid Waste Management Programme (NSWMP) involves the construction of infrastructure for new as well as the expansion and improvement of existing waste treatment, landfill, and recycling facilities.

In 2018, the Our District (Hayenna) project was launched with the help and investment of Switzerland. The project is to improve land use, and living conditions for people in the Qena Governorate.

In 2023, the Ministry of Planning and Economic Development announced the Citizen's Investment Plan for the Qena Governorate. The governorate is expected to have 277 development projects, and the value of investments directed to Qena Governorate will be EGP 4.7 billion. The aim of the plan is to address current development gaps to achieve regional convergence in living standards and incomes.

== Notable people ==
- Amr Gamal (footballer)
- Mohamed Ramadan (actor, singer)
- Abdel Rahman el-Abnudi (poet)
- Amal Dunqul (poet)
- Ahmad Fathi Sorour (politician)
- Makram Ebeid (politician)
- Mansour el-Essawy (politician)
- Omar Suleiman (politician)

== See also ==
- Dendera
- Hu
- Naqada culture
