= 2019–20 Egyptian Second Division =

Egyptian Second Division
- Season: 2019–20
- Dates: 20 October 2019 – 15 October 2020
- Champions: Group A: National Bank of Egypt; Group B: Ceramica Cleopatra; Group C: Ghazl El Mahalla
- Promoted: Group A: National Bank of Egypt; Group B: Ceramica Cleopatra; Group C: Ghazl El Mahalla
- Relegated: No relegation due to the COVID-19 pandemic in Egypt
- Matches: 396
- Goals: 830 (2.1 per match)
- Biggest home win: El Raja 6–1 Biyala (11 February 2020)
- Biggest away win: Biyala 0–6 Dikernis (13 October 2020)
- Highest scoring: El Raja 4–3 Al Hammam (27 November 2019); El Dakhleya 5–2 Al Zarka (10 February 2020); El Raja 6–1 Biyala (11 February 2020)
- Longest winning run: 6 games Ala'ab Damanhour; Ghazl El Mahalla
- Longest unbeaten run: 15 games El Dakhleya
- Longest winless run: 22 games Biyala
- Longest losing run: 11 games Biyala

The 2019–20 Egyptian Second Division was the 40th edition of the Egyptian Second Division, the top Egyptian semi-professional level for football clubs, since its establishment in 1977. The season started on 20 October 2019 and was originally scheduled to conclude on 21 April 2020, but was later changed to 15 October 2020 due to the COVID-19 pandemic in Egypt. Fixtures for the 2019–20 season were announced on 18 September 2019.

National Bank of Egypt, Ceramica Cleopatra and Ghazl El Mahalla won Group A, Group B and Group C respectively and secured the promotion to the 2020–21 Egyptian Premier League; with the first two earning a place in the top flight for the first time in their history.

On 14 March 2020, a decision was made by the Egyptian Football Association to postpone all football activities in Egypt due to the spread of the COVID-19 pandemic in the country. The initial suspension, until 29 March, was then extended multiple times until at least mid-July. On 2 July 2020, the EFA announced that football competitions in Egypt would resume, with the Premier League recommencing on 6 August, Second Division on 21 September and Egypt Cup on 30 September. The EFA also confirmed that all clubs' players and staff would be tested for COVID-19 before resuming training.

== Teams ==
=== Team changes ===
The following teams have changed division since the 2018–19 season.

==== To Second Division ====
Promoted from Third Division

- Asyut Petroleum
- Muslim Youths (Qena)
- Maleyat Kafr El Zayat
- National Bank of Egypt
- Biyala
- Dikernis

Relegated from Premier League

- Petrojet
- El Dakhleya
- Nogoom

==== From Second Division ====
Relegated to Third Division

- Al Nasr Lel Taa'den
- El Tahrir
- MS Naser Malawy
- Al Walideya
- El Shams
- Porto Suez
- Damietta
- Abou Sakal
- Kafr El Sheikh
- Al Jazeera
- MS Tala
- Sidi Salem

Promoted to Premier League

- Aswan
- FC Masr
- Tanta

=== Stadiums and locations ===
Note: Table lists in alphabetical order.

==== Group A ====
Locations of the 2019–20 Egyptian Second Division Group A teams

2 teams from Asyut, 2 teams from Beni Suef, 2 teams from Sohag, 2 teams from Qena, 1 team from Cairo, 1 team from Faiyum, 1 team from Giza, and 1 team from El Minya.

Club	Governorate	Stadium	2018–19 season
Al Aluminium	Qena	Al Aluminium Stadium	6th in Second Division Group A
Asyut Petroleum	Asyut	Asyut Petroleum Stadium	1st in Third Division Promotion Group A
Beni Suef	Beni Suef	Beni Suef Stadium	2nd in Second Division Group A
Dayrout	Asyut	Dayrout Stadium	7th in Second Division Group A
Faiyum	Faiyum	Al Assiouty Sport Resort Stadium (Note: Faiyum played their home matches at Al Assiouty Sport Resort Stadium instead of their regular stadium Faiyum Stadium.)	10th in Second Division Group A
Media	Cairo	Media Club Stadium	3rd in Second Division Group A
El Minya	El Minya	El Minya University Stadium	5th in Second Division Group A
Muslim Youths (Qena)	Qena	Muslim Youths Stadium (Qena)	2nd in Third Division Promotion Group A
National Bank of Egypt	Cairo	National Bank of Egypt Club Stadium	2nd in Third Division Promotion Group B
Sohag	Sohag	Sohag Stadium	9th in Second Division Group A
Tahta	Sohag	Tahta Stadium	8th in Second Division Group A
Telephonat Beni Suef	Beni Suef	Beni Suef Stadium	4th in Second Division Group A

==== Group B ====
Locations of the 2019–20 Egyptian Second Division Group B teams

3 teams from Cairo, 3 teams from Giza, 2 teams from Suez, 1 team from Damietta, 1 team from Ismailia, 1 team from El Monufia and 1 team from Port Said.

Club	Governorate	Stadium	2018–19 season
Ceramica Cleopatra	Giza	Suez Stadium (Note: Ceramica Cleopatra played their home matches at Suez Stadium instead of their regular stadium Ceramica Cleopatra Stadium.)	2nd in Second Division Group B
Coca-Cola	Cairo	Police Academy Stadium	5th in Second Division Group B
El Dakhleya	Cairo	Police Academy Stadium	17th in Premier League
Gomhoriat Shebin	El Monufia	Gomhoriat Shebin Stadium	7th in Second Division Group B
Al Merreikh	Port Said	Al Merreikh Stadium	6th in Second Division Group B
Al Nasr	Cairo	Al Nasr Stadium	8th in Second Division Group B
Nogoom	Giza	Nogoom Stadium	18th in Premier League
Petrojet	Suez	Egyptian Army Stadium	16th in Premier League
El Qanah	Ismailia	El Qanah Stadium	3rd in Second Division Group B
Suez	Suez	Suez Stadium	10th in Second Division Group B
Tersana	Giza	Hassan El Shazly Stadium	4th in Second Division Group B
Al Zarka	Damietta	Al Zarka Stadium	9th in Second Division Group B

==== Group C ====
Locations of the 2019–20 Egyptian Second Division Group C teams

3 teams from Alexandria, 3 teams from El Gharbia, 2 teams from El Dakahlia, 2 teams from Matruh, 1 team from El Beheira and 1 team from Kafr El Sheikh.

Club	Governorate	Stadium	2018–19 season
Abou Qir Fertilizers	Alexandria	Abou Qir Fertilizers Stadium	4th in Second Division Group C
Ala'ab Damanhour	El Beheira	Ala'ab Damanhour Stadium	7th in Second Division Group C
Baladeyet El Mahalla	El Gharbia	Baladeyet El Mahalla Stadium	6th in Second Division Group C
Biyala	Kafr El Sheikh	Kafr El Sheikh Stadium (Note: Biyala played their home matches at Kafr El Sheikh Stadium instead of their regular stadium Biyala Stadium.)	1st in Third Division Promotion Group C
Dikernis	El Dakahlia	Dikernis Stadium	2nd in Third Division Promotion Group C
Ghazl El Mahalla	El Gharbia	Ghazl El Mahalla Stadium	5th in Second Division Group C
Al Hammam	Matruh	MS Al Hammam Stadium	10th in Second Division Group C
Maleyat Kafr El Zayat	El Gharbia	Maleyat Kafr El Zayat Stadium	1st in Third Division Promotion Group B
El Mansoura	El Dakahlia	El Mansoura Stadium	8th in Second Division Group C
Olympic Club	Alexandria	Ezzedin Yacoub Stadium	3rd in Second Division Group C
Pharco	Alexandria	Haras El Hodoud Stadium (Note: Pharco played their home matches at Haras El Hodoud Stadium instead of their regular stadium Tolip Stadium.)	9th in Second Division Group C
El Raja	Matruh	MS Mersa Matruh Stadium	2nd in Second Division Group C

== Results ==
=== League tables ===
==== Group A ====
Pos	Team	Pld	W	D	L	GF	GA	GD	Pts	Promotion, qualification or relegation
1	National Bank of Egypt (C, P)	22	12	8	2	29	12	+17	44 (Note: Head-to-head points: National Bank of Egypt 6, Beni Suef 0.)	Promotion to the Premier League
2	Beni Suef	22	13	5	4	31	12	+19	44	
3	Al Aluminium	22	13	4	5	33	17	+16	43	
4	Muslim Youths (Qena)	22	9	8	5	18	19	−1	35	
5	Asyut Petroleum	22	9	6	7	25	24	+1	33	
6	El Minya	22	9	5	8	29	23	+6	32	
7	Telephonat Beni Suef	22	7	9	6	22	21	+1	30	
8	Sohag	22	7	7	8	18	17	+1	28	Reprieved from relegation to the Third Division (Note: The EFA announced on 26 October 2020 that there would be no relegation in the Second Division and the Third Division for the 2019–20 season due to the impacts caused by the COVID-19 pandemic in Egypt.)
9	Media	22	5	7	10	20	32	−12	22	Reprieved from relegation to the Third Division
10	Faiyum	22	6	3	13	18	25	−7	21	Reprieved from relegation to the Third Division
11	Dayrout	22	4	3	15	21	42	−21	15	Reprieved from relegation to the Third Division
12	Tahta	22	2	7	13	16	36	−20	13	Reprieved from relegation to the Third Division

Source: Kooora
Rules for classification: 1) Points; 2) Head-to-Head points; 3) Head-to-Head goal difference; 4) Head-to-Head goals scored; 5) Head-to-Head away goals scored; 6) Goal difference; 7) Goals scored; 8) Draw of lots (only if needed to decide teams for promotion or teams for relegation).
(Note: Head-to-head record is used only after all the matches between the teams in question have been played).
(C) Champions; (P) Promoted

==== Group B ====
Pos	Team	Pld	W	D	L	GF	GA	GD	Pts	Promotion, qualification or relegation
1	Ceramica Cleopatra (C, P)	22	11	10	1	29	13	+16	43	Promotion to the Premier League
2	Petrojet	22	12	6	4	22	10	+12	42	
3	El Dakhleya	22	11	8	3	32	16	+16	41	
4	El Qanah	22	8	9	5	20	16	+4	33 (Note: Head-to-head points: El Qanah 6, Suez 5, Al Nasr 4.)	
5	Suez	22	8	9	5	18	14	+4	33	
6	Al Nasr	22	9	6	7	27	22	+5	33	
7	Gomhoriat Shebin	22	5	11	6	12	11	+1	26	
8	Nogoom	22	6	7	9	25	24	+1	25	Reprieved from relegation to the Third Division (Note: The EFA announced on 26 October 2020 that there would be no relegation in the Second Division and the Third Division for the 2019–20 season due to the impacts caused by the COVID-19 pandemic in Egypt.)
9	Al Merreikh	22	4	9	9	22	33	−11	21	Reprieved from relegation to the Third Division
10	Coca-Cola	22	4	8	10	16	28	−12	20	Reprieved from relegation to the Third Division
11	Tersana	22	3	8	11	13	30	−17	17	Reprieved from relegation to the Third Division
12	Al Zarka	22	2	7	13	15	34	−19	13	Reprieved from relegation to the Third Division

Source: Kooora
Rules for classification: 1) Points; 2) Head-to-Head points; 3) Head-to-Head goal difference; 4) Head-to-Head goals scored; 5) Head-to-Head away goals scored; 6) Goal difference; 7) Goals scored; 8) Draw of lots (only if needed to decide teams for promotion or teams for relegation).
(Note: Head-to-head record is used only after all the matches between the teams in question have been played).
(C) Champions; (P) Promoted

==== Group C ====
Pos	Team	Pld	W	D	L	GF	GA	GD	Pts	Promotion, qualification or relegation
1	Ghazl El Mahalla (C, P)	22	14	5	3	32	11	+21	47	Promotion to the Premier League
2	Pharco	22	12	9	1	28	10	+18	45	
3	Dikernis	22	10	7	5	27	17	+10	37 (Note: Tied on head-to-head points (3), on head-to-head goal difference (0), on head-to-head goals scored (2) and on head-to-head away goals scored (2). Overall goal difference: Dikernis +10, Ala'ab Damanhour +4.)	
4	Ala'ab Damanhour	22	11	4	7	28	24	+4	37	
5	El Mansoura	22	9	8	5	25	21	+4	35	
6	Abou Qir Fertilizers	22	9	6	7	28	17	+11	33	
7	El Raja	22	8	7	7	32	29	+3	31	
8	Al Hammam	22	8	6	8	25	28	−3	30	Reprieved from relegation to the Third Division (Note: The EFA announced on 26 October 2020 that there would be no relegation in the Second Division and the Third Division for the 2019–20 season due to the impacts caused by the COVID-19 pandemic in Egypt.)
9	Olympic Club	22	7	6	9	20	18	+2	27	Reprieved from relegation to the Third Division
10	Baladeyet El Mahalla	22	7	4	11	25	32	−7	25	Reprieved from relegation to the Third Division
11	Maleyat Kafr El Zayat	22	1	5	16	19	40	−21	8	Reprieved from relegation to the Third Division
12	Biyala	22	0	5	17	10	52	−42	5	Reprieved from relegation to the Third Division

Source: Kooora
Rules for classification: 1) Points; 2) Head-to-Head points; 3) Head-to-Head goal difference; 4) Head-to-Head goals scored; 5) Head-to-Head away goals scored; 6) Goal difference; 7) Goals scored; 8) Draw of lots (only if needed to decide teams for promotion or teams for relegation).
(Note: Head-to-head record is used only after all the matches between the teams in question have been played).
(C) Champions; (P) Promoted

=== Positions by round ===
The tables lists the positions of teams after each week of matches. In order to preserve chronological evolvements, any postponed matches are not included in the round at which they were originally scheduled, but added to the full round they were played immediately afterwards. For example, if a match is scheduled for matchday 13, but then postponed and played between days 16 and 17, it will be added to the standings for day 16.

==== Group A ====
Team ╲ Round	1	2	3	4	5	6	7	8	9	10	11	12	13	14	15	16	17	18	19	20	21	22
National Bank of Egypt	6	2	2	1	1	1	2	2	2	1	1	1	1	1	1	3	2	2	2	2	1	1
Beni Suef	1	1	1	2	3	2	1	1	1	2	2	3	3	3	2	1	1	1	1	1	3	2
Al Aluminium	10	6	7	6	7	5	5	4	4	3	3	2	2	2	3	2	3	3	3	3	2	3
Muslim Youths (Qena)	12	7	5	3	2	4	4	3	3	4	4	4	4	4	4	4	4	4	4	4	4	4
Asyut Petroleum	2	4	4	5	5	6	6	6	8	7	8	6	7	7	6	7	5	5	5	5	5	5
El Minya	9	9	12	8	10	7	9	8	6	6	6	7	9	9	9	8	8	8	7	7	6	6
Telephonat Beni Suef	4	3	3	4	4	3	3	5	5	5	5	5	5	5	5	6	6	7	8	8	8	7
Sohag	8	10	11	11	12	9	7	7	7	9	10	8	8	8	7	5	7	6	6	6	7	8
Media	7	8	8	9	6	8	8	9	9	8	7	9	6	6	8	9	9	9	9	9	9	9
Faiyum	3	5	6	7	9	11	10	10	10	10	9	10	10	10	10	10	10	10	10	10	10	10
Dayrout	5	12	10	12	8	10	11	11	11	11	11	11	11	11	11	12	11	12	11	12	12	11
Tahta	11	11	9	10	11	12	12	12	12	12	12	12	12	12	12	11	12	11	12	11	11	12

Promotion to the Egyptian Premier League
Relegation to the Egyptian Third Division (later cancelled)

Source: Kooora

==== Group B ====
Team ╲ Round	1	2	3	4	5	6	7	8	9	10	11	12	13	14	15	16	17	18	19	20	21	22
Ceramica Cleopatra	2	1	1	1	1	1	1	1	1	1	1	1	1	1	1	1	1	1	1	1	1	1
Petrojet	8	5	6	8	9	8	8	9	9	8	6	4	4	3	3	3	3	2	3	3	2	2
El Dakhleya	11	12	7	7	6	7	7	7	5	3	2	2	2	2	2	2	2	3	2	2	3	3
El Qanah	9	4	3	4	3	6	2	2	2	2	3	3	5	7	7	8	7	6	6	5	5	4
Suez	1	2	2	2	2	3	4	4	3	4	4	6	3	5	4	4	5	4	5	6	6	5
Al Nasr	10	11	12	9	8	5	6	8	8	6	9	8	8	6	8	5	4	5	4	4	4	6
Gomhoriat Shebin	6	3	5	5	5	2	3	3	4	5	8	9	9	8	6	7	6	7	7	7	7	7
Nogoom	7	7	4	3	4	4	5	6	7	9	7	5	6	4	5	6	8	8	8	8	8	8
Al Merreikh	4	9	9	10	10	10	10	10	11	11	11	11	11	11	10	10	10	9	9	9	9	9
Coca-Cola	3	6	8	6	7	9	9	5	6	7	5	7	7	9	9	9	9	10	10	10	10	10
Tersana	12	10	10	11	12	12	11	11	10	10	10	10	10	10	11	11	11	11	11	11	11	11
Al Zarka	5	8	11	12	11	11	12	12	12	12	12	12	12	12	12	12	12	12	12	12	12	12

Promotion to the Egyptian Premier League
Relegation to the Egyptian Third Division (later cancelled)

Source: Kooora

==== Group C ====
Team ╲ Round	1	2	3	4	5	6	7	8	9	10	11	12	13	14	15	16	17	18	19	20	21	22
Ghazl El Mahalla	6	4	1	4	5	3	2	3	2	2	2	2	2	3	3	3	2	1	1	1	1	1
Pharco	8	5	2	1	1	1	1	1	1	1	1	1	1	1	1	2	3	2	2	2	2	2
Dikernis	1	1	4	2	3	4	5	7	5	7	8	6	4	4	5	6	7	6	5	5	5	3
Ala'ab Damanhour	2	3	3	3	2	5	3	4	4	4	3	3	3	2	2	1	1	3	3	3	3	4
El Mansoura	7	7	9	9	8	8	9	10	10	9	4	4	5	5	4	4	4	4	4	4	4	5
Abou Qir Fertilizers	4	6	5	5	6	6	7	5	6	8	9	9	10	8	7	7	5	5	6	6	6	6
El Raja	3	2	6	6	4	2	4	2	3	3	5	5	6	6	6	5	6	7	7	7	7	7
Al Hammam	10	10	7	7	10	10	10	9	9	6	7	8	8	9	9	9	9	10	10	9	8	8
Olympic Club	12	12	12	12	9	9	8	8	8	10	10	10	9	10	10	10	10	9	9	8	9	9
Baladeyet El Mahalla	5	8	10	10	7	7	6	6	7	5	6	7	7	7	8	8	8	8	8	10	10	10
Maleyat Kafr El Zayat	11	11	11	11	12	12	12	12	11	11	11	11	11	11	11	11	11	11	11	11	11	11
Biyala	9	9	8	8	11	11	11	11	12	12	12	12	12	12	12	12	12	12	12	12	12	12

Promotion to the Egyptian Premier League
Relegation to the Egyptian Third Division (later cancelled)

Source: Kooora

=== Results tables ===
==== Group A ====
Home \ Away	ALU	ASP	BSU	DAY	FAY	MED	MIN	MYQ	NBE	SOH	THT	TBS
Al Aluminium	—	1–0	1–0	2–1	1–0	3–0	1–0	4–1	1–0	2–1	2–2	2–2
Asyut Petroleum	1–0	—	0–0	2–1	3–1	2–0	1–0	1–2	1–1	3–2	2–0	2–1
Beni Suef	1–0	4–0	—	5–2	1–0	2–1	2–0	4–0	0–1	1–0	2–0	0–1
Dayrout	2–4	0–0	1–2	—	2–1	0–2	2–1	0–2	0–2	1–0	2–2	2–2
Faiyum	2–1	3–1	0–1	4–2	—	1–0	1–0	0–2	0–1	2–1	1–2	0–0
Media	1–3	1–1	1–1	1–0	2–1	—	2–1	0–1	1–1	1–3	2–1	0–2
El Minya	0–2	1–0	2–2	3–1	2–1	3–0	—	3–1	1–1	0–0	2–1	0–0
Muslim Youths (Qena)	0–0	2–1	0–0	1–0	0–0	1–0	1–1	—	0–2	1–0	1–0	0–1
National Bank of Egypt	2–1	2–0	2–0	3–0	1–0	2–2	0–2	0–0	—	1–1	2–0	3–1
Sohag	0–0	1–1	0–1	1–0	1–0	1–1	1–0	0–0	0–1	—	1–1	1–0
Tahta	0–2	0–2	0–2	1–2	0–0	1–1	2–4	1–1	0–0	0–1	—	2–1
Telephonat Beni Suef	1–0	1–1	0–0	1–0	1–0	1–1	1–3	1–1	1–1	0–2	3–0	—

Source: Kooora
Legend: Blue = home team win; Yellow = draw; Red = away team win.
For upcoming matches, an "a" indicates there is an article about the rivalry between the two participants.

==== Group B ====
Home \ Away	CCL	COC	DKH	GOM	MER	NAS	NOG	PET	QAN	SUE	TER	ZAR
Ceramica Cleopatra	—	1–0	2–0	0–0	1–0	1–1	2–1	1–2	1–1	0–0	2–1	2–0
Coca-Cola	1–1	—	0–2	0–0	0–1	1–0	0–4	1–1	0–1	0–2	1–0	1–1
El Dakhleya	0–0	2–2	—	1–0	1–0	2–1	0–0	0–1	0–0	1–2	3–0	5–2
Gomhoriat Shebin	0–1	0–0	0–0	—	1–1	0–0	1–1	0–1	2–0	2–0	1–0	2–1
Al Merreikh	1–5	2–3	2–4	1–0	—	2–2	1–1	0–3	0–1	2–2	0–0	1–1
Al Nasr	1–3	1–1	1–3	0–0	1–0	—	1–0	2–0	1–2	3–1	2–1	1–0
Nogoom	1–2	2–1	1–2	1–1	2–3	0–1	—	0–1	3–1	1–0	1–1	2–0
Petrojet	0–1	0–1	1–1	0–0	1–0	3–1	2–0	—	2–0	1–0	1–0	1–0
El Qanah	1–1	3–1	0–0	1–0	1–2	0–0	0–0	0–0	—	1–1	2–0	3–0
Suez	0–0	2–1	0–0	0–0	0–0	1–0	1–0	2–1	0–0	—	0–1	2–0
Tersana	1–1	0–0	0–3	1–2	1–1	1–5	2–2	0–0	1–0	0–2	—	1–1
Al Zarka	1–1	2–1	1–2	1–0	2–2	0–2	1–2	0–0	1–2	0–0	0–1	—

Source: Kooora
Legend: Blue = home team win; Yellow = draw; Red = away team win.
For upcoming matches, an "a" indicates there is an article about the rivalry between the two participants.

==== Group C ====
Home \ Away	AQF	ADM	BMH	BIY	DIK	GMH	HAM	MKZ	MAN	OLY	PHA	RAJ
Abou Qir Fertilizers	—	4–2	2–1	1–1	0–0	2–0	4–0	1–0	0–0	2–0	0–0	1–1
Ala'ab Damanhour	2–0	—	1–0	1–0	0–2	0–1	2–0	1–1	2–3	1–0	0–1	2–1
Baladeyet El Mahalla	1–3	1–1	—	4–0	1–0	0–3	2–2	2–1	1–2	1–0	0–4	2–1
Biyala	0–3	1–2	0–1	—	0–6	0–5	0–1	2–2	1–3	1–4	0–0	0–0
Dikernis	2–1	0–2	2–1	0–0	—	2–0	1–0	3–1	1–1	1–0	2–2	2–2
Ghazl El Mahalla	1–0	3–0	2–1	2–0	1–0	—	1–0	1–0	2–0	2–2	1–1	2–0
Al Hammam	1–0	1–3	2–1	2–0	1–0	0–0	—	1–1	0–0	0–0	0–0	4–1
Maleyat Kafr El Zayat	0–2	1–2	2–3	4–2	0–1	0–0	2–3	—	1–2	1–1	0–2	1–2
El Mansoura	1–1	1–1	1–1	2–1	1–1	1–0	1–0	2–0	—	0–1	0–2	2–1
Olympic Club	2–1	0–1	1–0	2–0	0–1	1–2	1–2	1–0	1–1	—	3–0	0–0
Pharco	1–0	2–1	0–0	1–0	0–0	1–1	4–2	2–0	1–0	1–0	—	3–0
El Raja	1–0	1–1	2–1	6–1	3–0	0–2	4–3	4–1	2–1	0–0	0–0	—

Source: Kooora
Legend: Blue = home team win; Yellow = draw; Red = away team win.
For upcoming matches, an "a" indicates there is an article about the rivalry between the two participants.

== Number of teams by governorate ==
Number of teams	Governorate	Team(s)
4	Cairo	Coca-Cola, El Dakhleya, Al Nasr and National Bank of Egypt
4	Giza	Ceramica Cleopatra, Media, Nogoom and Tersana
3	Alexandria	Abou Qir Fertilizers, Olympic Club and Pharco
3	El Gharbia	Baladeyet El Mahalla, Ghazl El Mahalla and Maleyat Kafr El Zayat
2	Asyut	Asyut Petroleum and Dayrout
2	Beni Suef	Beni Suef and Telephonat Beni Suef
2	El Dakahlia	Dikernis and El Mansoura
2	Matruh	Al Hammam and El Raja
2	Qena	Al Aluminium and Muslim Youths (Qena)
2	Sohag	Sohag and Tahta
2	Suez	Petrojet and Suez
1	El Beheira	Ala'ab Damanhour
1	Damietta	Al Zarka
1	Faiyum	Faiyum
1	Ismailia	El Qanah
1	Kafr El Sheikh	Biyala
1	El Minya	El Minya
1	El Monufia	Gomhoriat Shebin
1	Port Said	Al Merreikh
