= List of football clubs in Egypt =

This is a list of football clubs that compete within the leagues and divisions of the men's Egyptian football league system. The relative levels of divisions can be compared on the Egyptian football league system page.

== List ==
Football (soccer) clubs in Egypt:

Name	2020-2021 Division	City	Governorate	Number of years in Egyptian Premier League	Egyptian Premier League titles	Egypt Cup titles	International Trophies
Al Ahly	Premier League	Cairo	Cairo	59	43	39	25
Zamalek	Premier League	Giza	Giza	59	15	29	17
Ismaily	Premier League	Ismailia	Ismailia	55	3	2	1
Tersana	2nd Division	Giza	Giza	44	1	6	0
Ghazl El Mahalla	Premier League	El-Mahalla El-Kubra	El Gharbia	44	1	0	0
El Mokawloon SC	Premier League	Cairo	Cairo	29	1	3	3
El-Olympi	2nd Division	Alexandria	Alexandria	39	1	2	0
Al Ittihad Alexandria Club	Premier League	Alexandria	Alexandria	57	0	6	0
Al-Masry SC	Premier League	Port Said	Port Said	57	0	1	0
Haras El Hodood	Premier League	Alexandria	Alexandria	11	0	1	0
El-Teram	3rd Division	Alexandria	Alexandria	10	0	1	0
ENPPI	Premier League	Cairo	Cairo	9	0	1	0
El Mansoura SC	2nd Division	Al Mansurah	Dakahlia	30	0	0	0
El Qanah FC	2nd Division	Ismailia	Ismailia	28	0	1	0
El Sekka El Hadid	3rd Division	Cairo	Cairo	23	0	0	0
Suez SC	2nd Division	Suez	Suez	22	0	0	0
El Minya FC	2nd Division	El Minya	El Minya	13	0	0	0
Tanta FC	2nd Division	Tanta	Gharbia	12	0	0	0
Aswan FC	Premier League	Aswan	Aswan	7	0	0	0
El-Geish	Premier League	Cairo	Cairo	7	0	0	0
Misr El Makasa	Premier League	Fayoum	Fayoum	7	0	0	0
Smouha	Premier League	Alexandria	Alexandria	6	0	0	0
Sharkia SC	3rd Division	Zagazig	El-Sharqia	5	0	0	0
Petrojet SC	2nd Division	Suez	Suez	5	0	0	0
El Dakhleya	2nd Division	Cairo	Cairo	5	0	0	0
El-Entag El-Harby	Premier League	Cairo	Cairo	3	0	0	0
Wadi Degla	2nd Division	Maadi	Cairo	3	0	0	0
El Gouna	Premier League	El-Gouna	Red Sea	5	0	0	0
Telephonat Bani Sweif	2nd Division	Beni Suef	Beni Suef	3	0	0	0
Ittihad El-Shorta	2nd Division	Cairo	Cairo	3	0	0	0
Damanhour	2nd Division	Damanhur	Beheira	6	0	0	0
El Raja	2nd Division	Marsa Matruh	Matrouh	2	0	0	0
Pyramids	Premier League	Cairo	Cairo	2	0	0	0
Al Nasr	2nd Division	Cairo	Cairo	1	0	0	0
Nogoom	2nd Division	Giza	Giza	1	0	0	0
Petrol Asyut	2nd Division	Asyut	Asyut	4	0	0	0
Dessouk SC	3rd Division	Dessouk	Kafr El Sheikh	1	0	0	0
Asmant Suez	2nd Division	Suez	Suez	4	0	0	0
Sohag FC	2nd Division	Sohag	Sohag	1	0	0	0
El Aluminium	2nd Division	Nag Hammâdi	Qena	5	0	0	0
El-Koroum	2nd Division	Alexandria	Alexandria	11	0	0	0
Nile Sohag	2nd Division	Sohag	Sohag	1	0	0	0
Grand Hotel	3rd Division	Hurghada	Red Sea	1	0	0	0
Maleyat Kafr El-Zayat Club	2nd Division	Kafr El-Zayat	Gharbia	3	0	0	0
Baladeyet El-Mahalla	2nd Division	El-Mahalla El-Kubra	Gharbia	12	0	0	0
El Shams Club	2nd Division	Cairo	Cairo	1	0	0	0
Menit El Naser	3rd Division	Bani Ebeid	Dakahlia	0	0	0	0
Bani Ebeid SC	2nd Division	Bani Ebeid	Dakahlia	0	0	0	0
Telecom Egypt SC	2nd Division	El Hawamdeya	Giza	2	0	0	0
Damietta SC	3nd Division	Damietta	Damietta	8	0	0	0
BWADC SC	3rd Division	Abu Hummus	Beheira	2	0	0	0
El-Mareekh Club	2nd Division	Port Said	Port Said	8	0	0	0
Eastern Company	3rd Division	Giza	Giza	0	0	0	0
Gasco	2nd Division	Cairo	Cairo	0	0	0	0
Ghazl El Suez	3rd Division	Suez	Suez	2	0	0	0
El Fayoum FC	2nd Division	Faiyum	Faiyum	0	0	0	0
Kafr El Sheikh FC	2nd Division	Kafr El Sheikh	Kafr El Sheikh	2	0	0	0
El-Plastic	3rd Division	Shubra El Khema	Qalyubia	0	0	0	0
El Marg SC	3rd Division	Cairo	Cairo	0	0	0	0
Goldi SC	3rd Division	Sadat City	Monufia	4	0	0	0
El-Seid FC	4th Division	Giza	Giza	0	0	0	0
Beni Suef	2nd Division	Beni Suef	Beni Suef	4	0	0	0
El Madinah	3rd Division	Luxor	Luxor	0	0	0	0
Port Said FC	3rd Division	Port Said	Port Said	0	0	0	0
Abu Qair Semad	2nd Division	Alexandria	Alexandria	0	0	0	0
Sers Ellian FC	2nd Division	Sers Ellian	Monufia	0	0	0	0
Luxor FC	3rd Division	Luxor	Luxor	0	0	0	0
Al Nasr Lel Taa'den	2nd Division	Edfu	Aswan	1	0	0	0
Dekernes	2nd Division	Dekernes	Gharbia	0	0	0	0
Dayrout	2nd Division	Dayrout	Asyut	0	0	0	0
Coca Cola	2nd Division	Cairo	Cairo	0	0	0	0
Beila	2nd Division	Biyala	Kafr El Sheikh	0	0	0	0
Media	3rd Division	Giza	Giza	0	0	0	0
Al Zarka	2nd Division	Al Zarka	Damietta	0	0	0	0
Tahta	2nd Division	Tahta	Sohag	0	0	0	0
Al Hammam	2nd Division	Al Hammam	Mersa Matrouh	0	0	0	0
National Bank Of Egypt	Premier League	Cairo	Cairo	0	0	0	0
Ceramica Cleopatra	Premier League	Giza	Giza	0	0	0	0
Al Salam	2nd Division	Esna	Luxor	0	0	0	0
Al Aluminium	2nd Division	Nag Hammadi	Qena	0	0	0	0
Al Badari	2nd Division	Al Badari	Asyut	0	0	0	0
Banha	3rd Division	Banha	Qalyubia	0	0	0	0
Misr Insurance	3rd Division	Cairo	Cairo	0	0	0	0
Shouban Qena	2nd Division	Nag Hammadi	Qena	0	0	0	0
Senbalawin	3rd Division	Senbalawin	Gharbia	0	0	0	0
Olympic El Qanal	3rd Division	Ismailia	Ismailia	0	0	0	0
Samanoud	3rd Division	Samanoud	Gharbia	0	0	0	0
Al Wasta	3rd Division	Beni Suef	Beni Suef	0	0	0	0
Talkha Electricity	3rd Division	Talkha	Dakahlia	0	0	0	0
El Henawy	3rd Division	Cairo	Cairo	0	0	0	0
Abou Sakal	3rd Division	Arish	North Sinai	0	0	0	0
Al Fanar	3rd Division	Al Fanar	Port Said	0	0	0	0
Al Jazeera	2nd Division	Mersa Matruh	Matrouh	0	0	0	0
Al Rebat & Al Anwar	3rd Division	Port Said	Port Said	0	0	0	0
Al Walideya	3rd Division	Asyut	Asyut	0	0	0	0
Badr	3rd Division	Cairo	Cairo	0	0	0	0
Belkas	3rd Division	Belkas	Dakahlia	0	0	0	0
Beni Mazar	3rd Division	Beni Mazar	Minya	0	0	0	0
BWADC	3rd Division	Abu Hummus	Beheira	0	0	0	0
Damietta	3rd Division	Damietta	Damietta	0	0	0	0
Dina Farms	3rd Division	Cairo	Cairo	0	0	0	0
El Horreya	3rd Division	Mersa Matruh	Matruh	0	0	0	0
El Tahrir	3rd Division	El Tahrir	Aswan	0	0	0	0
Fayoum	2nd Division	Faiyum	Faiyum	0	0	0	0
Faqous	3rd Division	Faqous	Sharkia	0	0	0	0
Gomhoriat Shebin	2nd Division	Shebin El Koum	Monufia	6	0	0	0
Ittihad Nabarouh	3rd Division	Nabarouh	Dakahlia	0	0	0	0
Kahrabaa Ismailia	3rd Division	Ismailia	Ismailia	0	0	0	0
KIMA Aswan	2nd Division	Aswan	Aswan	0	0	0	0
Manshiyat El Shohada	3rd Division	Manshiyat El Shohada	Ismailia	0	0	0	0
Koum Hamada	3rd Division	Koum Hamada	Beheira	0	0	0	0
Minyat Samanoud	3rd Division	Samanoud	Gharbia	0	0	0	0
MS Naser Malawy	3rd Division	Naser Malawy	Minya	0	0	0	0
MS Tala	3rd Division	Tala	Monufia	0	0	0	0
MS Talya	3rd Division	Cairo	Cairo	0	0	0	0
Naser El Fekreia	3rd Division	Naser El Fekreia	Minya	0	0	0	0
Pharco	2nd Division	Alexandria	Alexandria	0	0	0	0
Porto Suez	3rd Division	Suez	Suez	0	0	0	0
Said El Mahalla	3rd Division	El Mahalla El Kubra	Gharbia	0	0	0	0
Sherbeen	3rd Division	Sherbeen	Dakahlia	0	0	0	0
Maadi & Yacht	3rd Division	Cairo	Cairo	0	0	0	0
ZED	2nd Division	Cairo	Cairo	0	0	0	0
El Wadi El Gedid	3rd Division	New Valley	New Valley	0	0	0	0
Quos	3rd Division	Qus	Qena	0	0	0	0
Aswan	3rd Division	Aswan	Aswan	0	0	0	0
Al Gomhoreya Club Draw	3rd Division	Aswan	Aswan	0	0	0	0
Abo Al Reesh	3rd Division	Aswan	Aswan	0	0	0	0
MS Edfu	3rd Division	Edfu	Aswan	0	0	0	0
Esna Young Muslims	3rd Division	Esna	Luxor	0	0	0	0
MS Al Radwaneya	3rd Division	Al Radwaneya	Luxor	0	0	0	0
Qeft	3rd Division	Qena	Sohag	0	0	0	0
MS Al Minaa	3rd Division	Red Sea	Red Sea	0	0	0	0
El Maragha	3rd Division	El Maragha	Sohag	0	0	0	0
Akhmim	3rd Division	Akhmim	Sohag	0	0	0	0
El Maragha Young Muslims	3rd Division	El Maragha	Sohag	0	0	0	0
Mecca	3rd Division	Sohag	Sohag	0	0	0	0
Ahli Al Monshaa	3rd Division	Al Monshaa	Sohag	0	0	0	0
Gerga	3rd Division	Gerga	Sohag	0	0	0	0
MS El Belina	3rd Division	El Belina	Sohag	0	0	0	0
MS Naga Mazen	3rd Division	Naga Mazen	Sohag	0	0	0	0
Heliopolis	4th Division	Cairo	Cairo	0	0	0	0
Sporting	2nd Division	Alexandria	Alexandria	0	0	0	0

== See also ==
- Category:Football clubs in Egypt
- Egyptian Premier League
- Egyptian Super Cup
- List of Egyptian football players in foreign leagues
