= 2018–19 Egyptian Second Division =

Egyptian Second Division
- Season: 2018–19
- Dates: 8 August 2018 – 19 April 2019
- Champions: Group A: Aswan; Group B: FC Masr; Group C: Tanta
- Promoted: Group A: Aswan; Group B: FC Masr; Group C: Tanta
- Relegated: Group A: Al Nasr Lel Taa'den El Tahrir MS Naser Malawy Al Walideya; Group B: El Shams Porto Suez Damietta Abou Sakal; Group C: Kafr El Sheikh Al Jazeera MS Tala Sidi Salem
- Matches: 546
- Goals: 1,252 (2.29 per match)
- Top goalscorer: Badara Naby Sylla (18 goals)
- Biggest home win: Ghazl El Mahalla 6–0 MS Tala (16 August 2018); Tersana 6–0 Abou Sakal (13 September 2018); Aswan 6–0 Al Walideya (21 February 2019)
- Biggest away win: Damietta 0–5 Tersana (28 February 2019)
- Highest scoring: FC Masr 5–4 El Qanah (7 March 2019)
- Longest winning run: 9 games Aswan
- Longest unbeaten run: 19 games Aswan
- Longest winless run: 26 games Abou Sakal
- Longest losing run: 10 games Al Walideya

The 2018–19 Egyptian Second Division was the 39th edition of the Egyptian Second Division, the top Egyptian semi-professional level for football clubs, since its establishment in 1977. The season started on 8 August 2018 and concluded on 19 April 2019. Fixtures for the 2018–19 season were announced on 23 May 2018.

Aswan, FC Masr and Tanta won Group A, Group B and Group C respectively and secured the promotion to the 2019–20 Egyptian Premier League.

== Team changes ==
The following teams have changed division since the 2017–18 season.

=== To Second Division ===
Promoted from Third Division

- El Tahrir
- MS Naser Malawy
- Tahta
- Media
- Porto Suez
- Damietta
- MS Tala
- Sidi Salem
- Al Jazeera

Relegated from Premier League

- El Raja
- Tanta
- Al Nasr

=== From Second Division ===
Relegated to Third Division

- KIMA Aswan
- Beni Mazar
- Qena
- Al Madina Al Monawara
- Al Salam
- El Sharkia
- National Bank
- Ittihad El Shorta
- Kahraba Ismailia
- Al Fanar
- Sherbeen
- MS Minyat Samanoud
- Ittihad Nabarouh
- Beni Ebeid
- MS Koum Hamada

Promoted to Premier League

- El Gouna
- Nogoom
- Haras El Hodoud

== Teams ==
A total of forty-two teams competed in the league – thirty sides from the 2017–18 season, three relegated from the 2017–18 Egyptian Premier League and nine promoted from the 2017–18 Egyptian Third Division.

Note: Table lists in alphabetical order.

=== Group A ===
Locations of the 2018–19 Egyptian Second Division Group A teams

Club	City	Stadium	2017–18 season
Al Aluminium	Nag Hammadi	Al Aluminium Stadium	5th in Second Division Group A
Aswan	Aswan	Aswan Stadium	3rd in Second Division Group A
Beni Suef	Beni Suef	Beni Suef Club Stadium	4th in Second Division Group A
Dayrout	Dayrout	MS Abnub Stadium	10th in Second Division Group A
Faiyum	Faiyum	Faiyum Stadium	8th in Second Division Group A
Media	Cairo	Media Stadium	1st in Third Division Group D
El Minya	El Minya	El Minya University Stadium	2nd in Second Division Group A
MS Naser Malawy	Malawy	MS Naser Malawy Stadium	1st in Third Division Group B
Al Nasr Lel Taa'den	Aswan	Aswan Stadium	7th in Second Division Group A
Sohag	Sohag	Sohag Stadium	9th in Second Division Group A
El Tahrir	Aswan	El Tahrir Stadium	1st in Third Division Group A
Tahta	Tahta	Tahta Stadium	1st in Third Division Group C
Telephonat Beni Suef	Beni Suef	Al Assiouty Sport Stadium	6th in Second Division Group A
Al Walideya	Assiut	Al Walideya Stadium	11th in Second Division Group A

=== Group B ===
Locations of the 2018–19 Egyptian Second Division Group B teams

Club	City	Stadium	2017–18 season
Abou Sakal	Arish	Arish Stadium	16th in Second Division Group B (Note: Despite the club withdrew from the league in the previous season due to the Insurgency in Sinai, the Egyptian Football Association reinstated the club to the Second Division for this season.)
Ceramica Cleopatra	Cairo	Cairo International Stadium	3rd in Second Division Group B
Coca-Cola	Cairo	Cairo International Stadium	4th in Second Division Group C
Damietta	Damietta	Ras El Bar Stadium	1st in Third Division Group F
FC Masr	Cairo	Cairo International Stadium	4th in Second Division Group B
Gomhoriat Shebin	Shebin El Koum	Banha Stadium	9th in Second Division Group B
Al Merreikh	Port Said	Al Merreikh Stadium	7th in Second Division Group B
Al Nasr	Cairo	Al Nasr Stadium	18th in Premier League
Porto Suez	Suez	Suez Canal Stadium	1st in Third Division Group E
El Qanah	Suez	Suez Canal Stadium	5th in Second Division Group B
El Shams	Cairo	El Shams Stadium	6th in Second Division Group B
Suez	Suez	Suez Stadium	8th in Second Division Group B
Tersana	Cairo	30 June Stadium	2nd in Second Division Group B
Al Zarka	Al Zarka	Al Zarka Stadium	10th in Second Division Group B

=== Group C ===
Locations of the 2018–19 Egyptian Second Division Group C teams

Club	City	Stadium	2017–18 season
Abou Qir Fertilizers	Abou Qir	Abou Qir Fertilizers Stadium	10th in Second Division Group C
Ala'ab Damanhour	Damanhour	Ala'ab Damanhour Stadium	11th in Second Division Group C
Baladeyet El Mahalla	El Mahalla	Ghazl El Mahalla Stadium	3rd in Second Division Group C
Ghazl El Mahalla	El Mahalla	Ghazl El Mahalla Stadium	7th in Second Division Group C
Al Hammam	Mersa Matruh	MS Al Hammam Stadium	9th in Second Division Group C
Al Jazeera	Mersa Matruh	MS Mersa Matruh Stadium	1st in Third Division Group I
Kafr El Sheikh	Kafr El Sheikh	Kafr El Sheikh Stadium	2nd in Second Division Group C
El Mansoura	El Mansoura	El Mansoura Stadium	5th in Second Division Group C
MS Tala	Tala	MS Tala Stadium	1st in Third Division Group G
Olympic Club	Alexandria	Ezzedin Yacoub Stadium	8th in Second Division Group C
Pharco	Alexandria	Borg El Arab Stadium	6th in Second Division Group C
El Raja	Mersa Matruh	MS Mersa Matruh Stadium	16th in Premier League
Sidi Salem	Sidi Salem	Sidi Salem Stadium	1st in Third Division Group H
Tanta	Tanta	Tanta Stadium	17th in Premier League

== Results ==
=== League tables ===
==== Group A ====
Pos	Team	Pld	W	D	L	GF	GA	GD	Pts	Promotion, qualification or relegation
1	Aswan (C, P)	26	17	7	2	46	20	+26	58	Promotion to the Premier League
2	Beni Suef	26	13	11	2	42	22	+20	50	
3	Media	26	12	7	7	38	30	+8	43 (Note: Head-to-head points: Media 4, Telephonat Beni Suef 1.)	
4	Telephonat Beni Suef	26	11	10	5	32	21	+11	43	
5	El Minya	26	10	11	5	44	32	+12	41	
6	Al Aluminium	26	10	9	7	36	28	+8	39	
7	Dayrout	26	9	9	8	31	36	−5	36	
8	Tahta	26	9	6	11	29	33	−4	33 (Note: Head-to-head points: Tahta 4, Sohag 1.)	
9	Sohag	26	7	12	7	21	19	+2	33	
10	Faiyum	26	7	10	9	28	27	+1	31 (Note: Head-to-head points: Faiyum 4, Al Nasr Lel Taa'den 1.)	
11	Al Nasr Lel Taa'den (R)	26	7	10	9	35	34	+1	31	Relegation to the Third Division
12	El Tahrir (R)	26	6	8	12	26	37	−11	26	Relegation to the Third Division
13	MS Naser Malawy (R)	26	3	5	18	20	48	−28	14	Relegation to the Third Division
14	Al Walideya (R)	26	3	1	22	21	62	−41	10	Relegation to the Third Division

Source: Kooora
Rules for classification: 1) Points; 2) Head-to-Head points; 3) Head-to-Head goal difference; 4) Head-to-Head goals scored; 5) Head-to-Head away goals scored; 6) Goal difference; 7) Goals scored; 8) Draw of lots (only if needed to decide teams for promotion or teams for relegation).
(Note: Head-to-head record is used only after all the matches between the teams in question have been played).
(C) Champions; (P) Promoted; (R) Relegated

==== Group B ====
Pos	Team	Pld	W	D	L	GF	GA	GD	Pts	Promotion, qualification or relegation
1	FC Masr (C, P)	26	14	10	2	49	25	+24	52	Promotion to the Premier League
2	Ceramica Cleopatra	26	15	6	5	42	20	+22	51	
3	El Qanah	26	15	5	6	39	21	+18	50	
4	Tersana	26	13	9	4	38	15	+23	48	
5	Coca-Cola	26	13	8	5	37	21	+16	47	
6	Al Merreikh	26	8	12	6	24	18	+6	36	
7	Gomhoriat Shebin	26	8	10	8	24	21	+3	34	
8	Al Nasr	26	8	9	9	32	32	0	33	
9	Al Zarka	26	8	6	12	21	31	−10	30 (Note: Head-to-head points: Al Zarka 8, Suez 5, El Shams 3.)	
10	Suez	26	7	9	10	26	27	−1	30	
11	El Shams (R)	26	8	6	12	25	30	−5	30	Relegation to the Third Division
12	Porto Suez (R)	26	6	8	12	27	34	−7	26	Relegation to the Third Division
13	Damietta (R)	26	5	5	16	15	47	−32	20	Relegation to the Third Division
14	Abou Sakal (R)	26	0	5	21	13	70	−57	5	Relegation to the Third Division

Source: Kooora
Rules for classification: 1) Points; 2) Head-to-Head points; 3) Head-to-Head goal difference; 4) Head-to-Head goals scored; 5) Head-to-Head away goals scored; 6) Goal difference; 7) Goals scored; 8) Draw of lots (only if needed to decide teams for promotion or teams for relegation).
(Note: Head-to-head record is used only after all the matches between the teams in question have been played).
(C) Champions; (P) Promoted; (R) Relegated

==== Group C ====
Pos	Team	Pld	W	D	L	GF	GA	GD	Pts	Promotion, qualification or relegation
1	Tanta (C, P)	26	14	10	2	27	12	+15	52	Promotion to the Premier League
2	El Raja	26	13	6	7	38	23	+15	45	
3	Olympic Club	26	12	8	6	34	20	+14	44 (Note: Tied on head-to-head points (3), on head-to-head goal difference (0), on head-to-head goals scored (1) and on head-to-head away goals scored (0). Overall goal difference: Olympic Club +14, Abou Qir Fertilizers +10.)	
4	Abou Qir Fertilizers	26	13	5	8	33	23	+10	44	
5	Ghazl El Mahalla	26	11	9	6	28	21	+7	42 (Note: Head-to-head points: Ghazl El Mahalla 8, Baladeyet El Mahalla 7, Ala'ab Damanhour 4.)	
6	Baladeyet El Mahalla	26	10	12	4	30	20	+10	42	
7	Ala'ab Damanhour	26	12	6	8	33	30	+3	42	
8	El Mansoura	26	11	7	8	25	21	+4	40	
9	Pharco	26	8	9	9	30	29	+1	33	
10	Al Hammam	26	8	8	10	29	32	−3	32	
11	Kafr El Sheikh (R)	26	7	9	10	31	32	−1	30	Relegation to the Third Division
12	Al Jazeera (R)	26	6	6	14	14	29	−15	24	Relegation to the Third Division
13	MS Tala (R)	26	2	8	16	25	52	−27	14	Relegation to the Third Division
14	Sidi Salem (R)	26	1	5	20	14	47	−33	8	Relegation to the Third Division

Source: Kooora
Rules for classification: 1) Points; 2) Head-to-Head points; 3) Head-to-Head goal difference; 4) Head-to-Head goals scored; 5) Head-to-Head away goals scored; 6) Goal difference; 7) Goals scored; 8) Draw of lots (only if needed to decide teams for promotion or teams for relegation).
(Note: Head-to-head record is used only after all the matches between the teams in question have been played).
(C) Champions; (P) Promoted; (R) Relegated

=== Positions by round ===
The table lists the positions of teams after each week of matches. In order to preserve chronological evolvements, any postponed matches are not included in the round at which they were originally scheduled, but added to the full round they were played immediately afterwards. For example, if a match is scheduled for matchday 13, but then postponed and played between days 16 and 17, it will be added to the standings for day 16.

==== Group A ====
Team ╲ Round	1	2	3	4	5	6	7	8	9	10	11	12	13	14	15	16	17	18	19	20	21	22	23	24	25	26
Aswan	6	9	5	3	2	1	2	2	2	2	2	2	2	2	1	1	1	1	1	1	1	1	1	1	1	1
Beni Suef	8	11	7	8	5	4	1	1	1	1	1	1	1	1	2	2	2	2	2	2	2	2	2	2	2	2
Media	13	6	3	7	9	8	7	9	7	7	8	6	5	4	4	3	5	5	5	5	5	4	4	4	3	3
Telephonat Beni Suef	1	4	8	4	6	6	6	5	6	6	6	5	4	6	5	4	4	3	3	3	3	3	3	3	4	4
El Minya	5	3	9	5	3	2	4	4	4	4	3	3	3	3	3	5	3	4	4	4	4	5	5	5	5	5
Al Aluminium	7	8	11	9	10	10	10	10	11	8	5	8	8	5	6	6	6	8	8	8	8	9	7	8	6	6
Dayrout	4	7	4	1	1	5	5	6	5	5	9	10	10	9	10	9	7	6	6	6	6	8	9	6	7	7
Tahta	3	1	2	6	7	7	8	7	8	10	7	9	9	10	9	10	10	10	9	9	9	7	8	9	8	8
Sohag	12	5	10	11	11	11	11	11	9	9	10	7	7	7	7	7	8	7	7	7	7	6	6	7	9	9
Faiyum	9	10	6	10	8	9	9	8	10	11	11	11	11	12	11	12	12	11	11	11	11	11	11	11	10	10
Al Nasr Lel Taa'den	2	2	1	2	4	3	3	3	3	3	4	4	6	8	8	8	9	9	10	10	10	10	10	10	11	11
El Tahrir	14	14	14	12	13	12	12	12	12	12	12	12	12	11	12	11	11	12	12	12	12	12	12	12	12	12
MS Naser Malawy	10	13	12	14	14	14	14	14	14	14	13	13	13	14	13	14	13	13	13	13	13	13	13	13	13	13
Al Walideya	11	12	13	13	12	13	13	13	13	13	14	14	14	13	14	13	14	14	14	14	14	14	14	14	14	14

Promotion to 2019–20 Egyptian Premier League
Relegation to 2019–20 Egyptian Third Division

Source: Kooora

==== Group B ====
Team ╲ Round	1	2	3	4	5	6	7	8	9	10	11	12	13	14	15	16	17	18	19	20	21	22	23	24	25	26
FC Masr	1	2	3	5	7	5	5	2	1	2	2	4	4	2	4	5	5	4	2	2	1	1	1	1	1	1
Ceramica Cleopatra	2	3	1	1	1	2	4	1	3	1	1	3	2	3	3	2	1	1	3	4	4	4	3	3	2	2
El Qanah	5	1	2	2	2	1	3	5	2	4	4	2	5	5	2	3	3	2	4	3	3	3	4	4	3	3
Tersana	8	6	5	3	3	4	1	4	4	5	5	5	3	1	1	1	2	3	1	1	2	2	2	2	4	4
Coca-Cola	6	9	4	6	4	3	2	3	5	3	3	1	1	4	5	4	4	5	5	5	5	5	5	5	5	5
Al Merreikh	7	10	8	8	10	10	11	11	12	8	8	7	7	6	7	6	6	6	6	6	6	7	6	6	6	6
Gomhoriat Shebin	11	8	7	7	5	6	7	9	9	10	7	8	8	7	6	7	7	7	7	7	8	8	8	8	8	7
Al Nasr	12	12	13	13	13	13	9	8	7	7	9	9	9	10	12	10	8	9	8	9	7	6	7	7	7	8
Al Zarka	3	4	9	9	11	8	10	10	10	12	12	13	13	11	10	12	10	11	12	10	9	9	9	10	10	9
Suez	9	11	6	11	12	12	12	13	13	11	11	10	11	13	11	9	11	12	11	12	12	11	10	9	9	10
El Shams	10	7	11	4	9	7	6	6	6	6	6	6	6	8	8	8	9	8	9	8	10	10	11	11	11	11
Porto Suez	13	13	12	12	6	9	8	7	11	13	13	12	10	9	9	11	12	10	10	11	11	12	12	12	12	12
Damietta	4	5	10	10	8	11	13	12	8	9	10	11	12	12	13	13	13	13	13	13	13	13	13	13	13	13
Abou Sakal	14	14	14	14	14	14	14	14	14	14	14	14	14	14	14	14	14	14	14	14	14	14	14	14	14	14

Promotion to 2019–20 Egyptian Premier League
Relegation to 2019–20 Egyptian Third Division

Source: Kooora

==== Group C ====
Team ╲ Round	1	2	3	4	5	6	7	8	9	10	11	12	13	14	15	16	17	18	19	20	21	22	23	24	25	26
Tanta	8	5	3	5	5	3	4	5	4	6	8	7	4	3	4	4	4	2	1	1	1	1	1	1	1	1
El Raja	1	6	5	2	2	2	3	2	2	1	1	1	1	1	1	5	2	5	5	6	7	5	3	2	4	2
Olympic Club	5	9	9	9	8	10	7	7	9	8	7	8	6	4	6	7	6	4	4	3	5	2	4	3	2	3
Abou Qir Fertilizers	9	13	12	8	9	8	9	10	7	4	3	4	8	8	8	8	8	7	7	7	6	7	5	5	3	4
Ghazl El Mahalla	2	1	4	6	7	7	5	4	6	5	5	6	7	5	7	6	7	8	8	8	8	8	8	8	8	5
Baladeyet El Mahalla	3	2	2	3	3	5	6	6	5	7	6	3	5	7	5	3	3	6	6	5	4	6	7	4	5	6
Ala'ab Damanhour	14	8	6	7	6	4	2	1	1	3	4	5	2	2	2	1	1	1	3	4	2	3	2	6	6	7
El Mansoura	6	3	1	1	1	1	1	3	3	2	2	2	3	6	3	2	5	3	2	2	3	4	6	7	7	8
Pharco	7	4	7	4	4	6	8	9	11	12	11	9	9	9	9	9	9	9	10	10	10	10	9	9	9	9
Al Hammam	4	7	8	10	10	12	12	12	12	10	10	10	10	10	11	11	11	11	9	9	9	9	10	10	10	10
Kafr El Sheikh	12	11	11	13	13	11	10	8	8	11	12	12	11	11	10	10	10	10	11	11	11	11	11	11	11	11
Al Jazeera	10	12	14	11	11	9	11	11	10	9	9	11	12	12	12	12	12	12	12	12	12	12	12	12	12	12
MS Tala	13	14	10	12	12	13	13	13	13	13	13	13	13	13	13	13	13	13	13	13	13	13	13	13	13	13
Sidi Salem	11	10	13	14	14	14	14	14	14	14	14	14	14	14	14	14	14	14	14	14	14	14	14	14	14	14

Promotion to 2019–20 Egyptian Premier League
Relegation to 2019–20 Egyptian Third Division

Source: Kooora

=== Results tables ===
==== Group A ====
Home \ Away	ALU	ASW	BSU	DAY	FAY	MED	MIN	MSN	NLT	SOH	THR	THT	TBS	WAL
Al Aluminium	—	1–2	2–5	0–1	1–0	3–2	1–1	5–1	2–2	0–0	2–0	2–0	3–0	3–1
Aswan	1–0	—	1–0	2–0	1–1	3–2	2–2	5–2	2–0	2–0	0–0	3–2	0–0	6–0
Beni Suef	0–0	0–0	—	2–0	3–0	3–0	3–2	1–0	2–1	1–1	2–0	1–1	2–1	4–1
Dayrout	3–1	0–1	2–2	—	1–0	3–3	2–2	1–0	1–1	1–0	2–1	1–1	1–1	2–1
Faiyum	1–1	1–1	0–1	4–1	—	2–0	1–1	3–0	1–0	0–2	2–0	1–1	0–0	4–0
Media	0–2	1–2	1–1	2–0	2–1	—	2–1	2–1	1–0	0–0	3–0	2–0	0–0	1–0
El Minya	0–0	0–1	1–1	1–1	4–0	2–2	—	4–0	1–1	0–0	2–1	3–2	3–2	3–1
MS Naser Malawy	1–0	1–2	1–1	2–0	2–2	0–2	1–2	—	1–2	0–0	1–1	0–1	1–1	1–2
Al Nasr Lel Taa'den	1–1	1–2	2–2	1–1	1–1	2–0	2–1	2–1	—	2–0	3–3	1–3	0–0	6–1
Sohag	0–0	0–1	0–0	0–0	1–2	2–2	1–2	3–1	3–1	—	1–0	0–1	0–0	2–0
El Tahrir	1–1	2–0	1–1	2–3	1–0	1–1	1–1	1–0	1–1	2–3	—	1–2	2–0	1–0
Tahta	1–2	1–0	0–1	2–1	0–0	0–3	0–1	3–0	1–2	1–1	2–0	—	0–0	2–1
Telephonat Beni Suef	3–1	2–2	4–2	3–1	1–0	0–1	2–1	2–1	1–0	0–0	3–0	2–0	—	2–0
Al Walideya	1–2	1–4	0–1	1–2	1–1	1–3	2–3	0–1	1–0	0–1	1–3	4–2	0–2	—

Source: Kooora
Legend: Blue = home team win; Yellow = draw; Red = away team win.

==== Group B ====
Home \ Away	ABS	CCL	COC	DAM	FCM	GOM	MER	NAS	POR	QAN	SHM	SUE	TER	ZAR
Abou Sakal	—	0–2	2–2	0–1	1–5	0–2	2–3	2–5	1–1	0–2	1–2	0–1	0–0	1–1
Ceramica Cleopatra	5–0	—	1–3	4–0	0–3	2–0	1–1	0–0	1–2	1–0	1–0	3–2	1–0	3–1
Coca-Cola	2–0	1–0	—	2–2	0–0	1–1	0–1	2–1	3–1	0–2	5–0	1–0	2–0	1–0
Damietta	2–1	0–3	1–2	—	0–2	0–1	0–0	1–1	1–2	0–1	1–0	1–2	0–5	0–0
FC Masr	6–1	3–1	1–1	2–2	—	1–0	1–1	1–1	2–1	5–4	1–0	0–0	0–0	2–1
Gomhoriat Shebin	2–0	1–1	0–0	2–0	1–2	—	0–0	1–2	1–0	1–2	0–1	2–0	1–1	1–1
Al Merreikh	4–0	0–2	2–2	3–0	0–0	0–0	—	0–0	1–0	1–1	1–0	1–1	0–1	2–0
Al Nasr	3–0	0–1	1–1	0–1	3–3	2–2	1–0	—	1–4	1–0	1–2	3–1	2–3	0–1
Porto Suez	1–1	0–2	1–2	2–1	2–3	0–1	2–2	2–1	—	1–0	2–2	0–0	0–1	2–3
El Qanah	4–0	2–2	1–0	2–0	0–2	1–0	1–0	3–0	2–0	—	1–0	0–0	1–1	2–1
El Shams	5–0	0–0	1–0	0–1	3–2	1–1	0–0	0–0	0–0	0–1	—	2–1	2–0	0–1
Suez	2–0	1–3	0–1	4–0	0–0	1–2	2–0	1–2	0–0	3–2	3–2	—	0–0	0–0
Tersana	6–0	0–0	2–1	3–0	2–1	1–1	1–0	0–0	1–0	0–0	4–1	2–1	—	4–0
Al Zarka	1–0	0–2	0–2	3–0	0–1	1–0	0–1	0–1	1–1	2–4	2–1	0–0	1–0	—

Source: Kooora
Legend: Blue = home team win; Yellow = draw; Red = away team win.

==== Group C ====
Home \ Away	AQF	ADM	BMH	GMH	HAM	JAZ	KSH	MAN	MST	OLY	PHA	RAJ	SID	TNT
Abou Qir Fertilizers	—	3–2	0–3	2–2	0–0	3–1	2–1	2–0	3–1	1–0	2–0	3–0	1–0	0–2
Ala'ab Damanhour	1–0	—	0–1	2–0	2–1	1–0	3–3	1–0	2–1	2–0	2–0	4–2	2–2	0–0
Baladeyet El Mahalla	2–1	2–0	—	2–3	2–2	0–0	1–0	1–0	3–1	0–3	1–1	1–3	2–1	1–1
Ghazl El Mahalla	0–1	1–1	0–0	—	1–0	1–0	3–2	0–0	6–0	2–2	1–1	1–0	1–0	2–1
Al Hammam	2–1	3–1	0–0	0–0	—	1–1	0–1	2–1	2–1	0–2	1–2	1–3	1–0	1–2
Al Jazeera	0–0	0–1	1–0	0–1	1–0	—	0–1	1–2	1–0	0–1	0–3	1–1	1–0	0–1
Kafr El Sheikh	1–1	1–1	0–0	1–2	0–1	3–1	—	1–0	4–1	1–1	2–2	1–3	3–1	0–0
El Mansoura	1–2	1–0	0–0	1–0	2–2	1–1	0–2	—	0–0	1–0	2–1	2–0	1–1	1–1
MS Tala	0–3	3–1	1–3	0–0	4–4	0–1	2–2	0–1	—	0–0	1–1	1–1	3–0	1–2
Olympic Club	1–0	1–1	1–1	2–0	1–2	2–1	1–0	1–3	5–1	—	2–1	1–0	1–0	0–0
Pharco	1–0	1–2	1–4	0–0	1–0	5–1	1–0	1–0	0–0	1–1	—	1–2	2–0	1–2
El Raja	1–1	3–0	0–0	2–0	1–1	1–0	3–0	0–1	2–0	1–0	2–1	—	3–0	0–0
Sidi Salem	0–1	0–1	0–0	0–1	1–2	0–1	1–1	1–2	3–2	1–5	1–1	0–3	—	0–2
Tanta	1–0	1–0	0–0	1–0	1–0	0–0	1–0	0–2	2–1	0–0	0–0	2–1	4–1	—

Source: Kooora
Legend: Blue = home team win; Yellow = draw; Red = away team win.
