= 2020–21 Egyptian Second Division =

Egyptian Second Division
- Season: 2020–21
- Dates: 25 November 2020 – 3 July 2021
- Promoted: Group A: Eastern Company; Group B: Coca-Cola; Group C: Pharco
- Relegated: Group A: Asyut Cement Muslim Youths (Qena) MS Samasta Tahta; Group B: Gomhoriat Shebin Sers El Layan Nogoom Tanta; Group C: Maleyat Kafr El Zayat Al Jazeera Beni Ebeid Biyala
- Matches: 720
- Goals: 1,417 (1.97 per match)
- Biggest home win: Media 5–0 Qena (30 January 2021); Pharco 6–1 Biyala (25 February 2021); Baladeyet El Mahalla 5–0 Biyala (1 July 2021); Eastern Company 5–0 Tahta (3 July 2021)
- Biggest away win: El Raja 1–7 Al Hammam (1 July 2021)
- Highest scoring: Faiyum 6–2 Tahta (17 May 2021); El Raja 1–7 Al Hammam (1 July 2021)

The 2020–21 Egyptian Second Division was the 41st edition of the Egyptian Second Division, the top Egyptian semi-professional level for football clubs, since its establishment in 1977. The season started on 25 November 2020 and concluded on 3 July 2021. Fixtures for the 2020–21 season were announced on 11 November 2020, two weeks before the start of the competition.

Eastern Company, Coca-Cola and Pharco won Group A, Group B and Group C respectively and secured the promotion to the 2021–22 Egyptian Premier League; all of them earning a place in the top flight for the first time in their history.

All teams that earned promotion this season are owned and named after corporations, which caused wide controversies in the football scene in Egypt because the number of teams in the next season's premier league could rise up to 12 teams, which is two third of the total number of sides in the league. The Egyptian Football Association was also heavily criticized for not applying a club naming policy that prevents companies and corporations names from being included in club's name, similar to the rule applied by the German Football Association.

== Promoted clubs ==
Team	Location	Stadium	Capacity
Eastern Company SC			
Future FC (Egypt)	Cairo	Al Salam Stadium	30,000
Pharco FC	Borg el-Arab	Borg El Arab Stadium	86,000

== Teams ==
=== Team changes ===
The following teams have changed division since the 2019–20 season.

==== To Second Division ====
Promoted from Third Division

- KIMA Aswan
- Qena
- Asyut Cement
- MS Samasta
- Eastern Company
- El Sekka El Hadid
- Porto Suez
- Kafr El Sheikh
- Beni Ebeid
- Sers El Layan
- Sporting Alexandria
- Al Jazeera

Relegated from Premier League

- Haras El Hodoud
- Tanta
- ZED (Note: The club was known as FC Masr until November 2020, when ZED Egypt acquired the club and renamed it to ZED FC.)

==== From Second Division ====
Originally relegated to Third Division, later reprieved due to the COVID-19 pandemic in Egypt

- Sohag
- Media
- Faiyum
- Dayrout
- Tahta
- Nogoom
- Al Merreikh
- Coca-Cola
- Tersana
- Al Zarka
- Al Hammam
- Olympic Club
- Baladeyet El Mahalla
- Maleyat Kafr El Zayat
- Biyala

Promoted to Premier League

- National Bank of Egypt
- Ceramica Cleopatra
- Ghazl El Mahalla

=== Stadiums and locations ===
Note: Table lists in alphabetical order.

==== Group A ====
Locations of the 2020–21 Egyptian Second Division Group A teams

3 teams from Asyut, 3 teams from Beni Suef, 3 teams from Qena, 2 teams from Giza, 2 teams from Sohag, 1 team from Aswan, 1 team from Faiyum and 1 team from El Minya.

Club	Governorate	Stadium	2019–20 season
Al Aluminium	Qena	Al Aluminium Stadium	3rd in Second Division Group A
Asyut Cement	Asyut	Asyut Cement Stadium	1st in Third Division Group C
Asyut Petroleum	Asyut	Asyut Petroleum Stadium	5th in Second Division Group A
Beni Suef	Beni Suef	Beni Suef Stadium	2nd in Second Division Group A
Dayrout	Asyut	Dayrout Stadium	11th in Second Division Group A
Eastern Company	Giza	Eastern Company Stadium	1st in Third Division Group E
Faiyum	Faiyum	Al Assiouty Sport Resort Stadium (Note: Faiyum played their home matches at Al Assiouty Sport Resort Stadium instead of their regular stadium Faiyum Stadium.)	10th in Second Division Group A
KIMA Aswan	Aswan	KIMA Aswan Stadium	1st in Third Division Group A
Media	Giza	Media Club Stadium	9th in Second Division Group A
El Minya	El Minya	El Minya Stadium	6th in Second Division Group A
MS Samasta	Beni Suef	MS Biba Stadium (Note: MS Samasta played their home matches at MS Biba Stadium instead of their regular stadium MS Samasta Stadium.)	1st in Third Division Group D
Muslim Youths (Qena)	Qena	Muslim Youths Stadium	4th in Second Division Group A
Qena	Qena	Qena Stadium	1st in Third Division Group B
Sohag	Sohag	Sohag Stadium	8th in Second Division Group A
Tahta	Sohag	Tahta Stadium	12th in Second Division Group A
Telephonat Beni Suef	Beni Suef	Al Assiouty Sport Resort Stadium (Note: Telephonat Beni Suef played their home matches at Al Assiouty Sport Resort Stadium instead of their regular stadium Telephonat Beni Suef Stadium.)	7th in Second Division Group A

==== Group B ====
Locations of the 2020–21 Egyptian Second Division Group B teams

5 teams from Cairo, 3 teams from Suez, 2 teams from Giza, 2 teams from El Monufia, 1 team from Damietta, 1 team from El Gharbia, 1 team from Ismailia, and 1 team from Port Said.

Club	Governorate	Stadium	2019–20 season
Coca-Cola	Cairo	30 June Stadium subfield	10th in Second Division Group B
El Dakhleya	Cairo	Police Academy Stadium	3rd in Second Division Group B
Gomhoriat Shebin	El Monufia	El Monufia University Stadium (Note: Gomhoriat Shebin played selected matches at Gomhoriat Shebin Stadium.)	7th in Second Division Group B
Al Merreikh	Port Said	Al Merreikh Stadium	9th in Second Division Group B
Al Nasr	Cairo	Al Nasr Stadium	6th in Second Division Group B
Nogoom	Giza	Nogoom Stadium	8th in Second Division Group B
Petrojet	Suez	Petro Sport Stadium (Note: Petrojet played selected matches at Suez Stadium.)	2nd in Second Division Group B
Porto Suez	Suez	Egyptian Army Stadium (Note: Porto Suez played selected matches at Porto Suez Stadium.)	1st in Third Division Group G
El Qanah	Ismailia	El Qanah Stadium	4th in Second Division Group B
El Sekka El Hadid	Cairo	El Sekka El Hadid Stadium	1st in Third Division Group F
Sers El Layan	El Monufia	Sers El Layan Stadium	1st in Third Division Group J
Suez	Suez	Egyptian Army Stadium	5th in Second Division Group B
Tanta	El Gharbia	Tanta Club Stadium	17th in Premier League
Tersana	Giza	Hassan El Shazly Stadium	11th in Second Division Group B
Al Zarka	Damietta	Al Ahly Faraskur Stadium (Note: Al Zarka played their home matches at Al Ahly Faraskur Stadium instead of their regular stadium Al Zarka Stadium.)	12th in Second Division Group B
ZED	Cairo	ZED Park	18th in Premier League

==== Group C ====
Locations of the 2020–21 Egyptian Second Division Group C teams

5 teams from Alexandria, 3 teams from El Dakahlia, 3 teams from Matruh, 2 teams from El Gharbia, 2 teams from Kafr El Sheikh, and 1 team from El Beheira.

Club	Governorate	Stadium	2019–20 season
Abou Qir Fertilizers	Alexandria	Abou Qir Fertilizers Stadium	6th in Second Division Group C
Ala'ab Damanhour	El Beheira	Ala'ab Damanhour Stadium	4th in Second Division Group C
Baladeyet El Mahalla	El Gharbia	Baladeyet El Mahalla Stadium	10th in Second Division Group C
Beni Ebeid	El Dakahlia	Beni Ebeid Stadium	1st in Third Division Group I
Biyala	Kafr El Sheikh	Sakha Stadium (Note: Biyala played their home matches at Sakha Stadium and Kafr El Sheikh Stadium instead of their regular stadium Biyala Stadium.)	12th in Second Division Group C
Dikernis	El Dakahlia	Dikernis Stadium	3rd in Second Division Group C
Al Hammam	Matruh	MS Al Hammam Stadium	8th in Second Division Group C
Haras El Hodoud	Alexandria	Haras El Hodoud Stadium	16th in Premier League
Al Jazeera	Matruh	MS Mersa Matruh Stadium (Note: Al Jazeera played their home matches at Abou Qir Youth City Stadium instead of their regular stadium MS Mersa Matruh Stadium.)	1st in Third Division Group L
Kafr El Sheikh	Kafr El Sheikh	Kafr El Sheikh Stadium	1st in Third Division Group H
Maleyat Kafr El Zayat	El Gharbia	Maleyat Kafr El Zayat Stadium	11th in Second Division Group C
El Mansoura	El Dakahlia	El Mansoura Stadium	5th in Second Division Group C
Olympic Club	Alexandria	Ezzedin Yacoub Stadium	9th in Second Division Group C
Pharco	Alexandria	Alexandria Stadium (Note: Pharco played their home matches at Alexandria Stadium instead of their regular stadium Tolip Stadium.)	2nd in Second Division Group C
El Raja	Matruh	MS Mersa Matruh Stadium (Note: El Raja played their home matches at Abou Qir Youth City Stadium instead of their regular stadium MS Mersa Matruh Stadium.)	7th in Second Division Group C
Sporting Alexandria	Alexandria	Alexandria Sporting Club Stadium	1st in Third Division Group K

== Results ==
=== League tables ===
==== Group A ====
Pos	Team	Pld	W	D	L	GF	GA	GD	Pts	Promotion, qualification or relegation
1	Eastern Company (P)	30	17	8	5	50	29	+21	59	Promotion to the Premier League
2	Al Aluminium	30	17	6	7	40	23	+17	57	
3	El Minya	30	14	13	3	38	23	+15	55	
4	Media	30	12	10	8	35	28	+7	46	
5	Beni Suef	30	11	10	9	28	28	0	43 (Note: Head-to-head points: Beni Suef 6, Faiyum 5, Asyut Petroleum 3.)	
6	Faiyum	30	11	10	9	30	25	+5	43	
7	Asyut Petroleum	30	10	13	7	26	21	+5	43	
8	Sohag	30	10	10	10	22	21	+1	40	
9	Dayrout	30	10	8	12	45	43	+2	38	
10	Qena	30	9	9	12	29	32	−3	36 (Note: Tied on head-to-head points (2), on head-to-head goal difference (0), on head-to-head goals scored (0), on head-to-head away goals scored (0) and on overall goal difference (–3). Overall goals scored: Qena 29, KIMA Aswan 27.)	
11	KIMA Aswan	30	8	12	10	27	30	−3	36	
12	Telephonat Beni Suef	30	8	11	11	24	25	−1	35	
13	Asyut Cement (R)	30	8	9	13	29	37	−8	33 (Note: Tied on head-to-head points (3). Head-to-head goal difference: Asyut Cement +1, Muslim Youths (Qena) –1.)	Relegation to the Third Division
14	Muslim Youths (Qena) (R)	30	7	12	11	20	26	−6	33	Relegation to the Third Division
15	MS Samasta (R)	30	6	11	13	21	36	−15	29	Relegation to the Third Division
16	Tahta (R)	30	3	6	21	27	64	−37	15	Relegation to the Third Division

Source: Kooora
Rules for classification: 1) Points; 2) Head-to-Head points; 3) Head-to-Head goal difference; 4) Head-to-Head goals scored; 5) Head-to-Head away goals scored; 6) Goal difference; 7) Goals scored; 8) Draw of lots (only if needed to decide teams for promotion or teams for relegation).
(Note: Head-to-head record is used only after all the matches between the teams in question have been played).
(P) Promoted; (R) Relegated

==== Group B ====
Pos	Team	Pld	W	D	L	GF	GA	GD	Pts	Promotion, qualification or relegation
1	Coca-Cola (P)	30	15	7	8	33	22	+11	52	Promotion to the Premier League
2	El Dakhleya	30	12	14	4	30	23	+7	50	
3	Porto Suez	30	11	13	6	28	25	+3	46	
4	Al Nasr	30	12	8	10	44	36	+8	44	
5	El Qanah	30	10	13	7	30	23	+7	43 (Note: Tied on head-to-head points (3). Head-to-head goal difference: Petrojet +1, El Qanah –1.)	
6	Petrojet	30	11	10	9	28	21	+7	43	
7	Suez	30	10	11	9	22	24	−2	41	
8	Tersana	30	10	9	11	27	24	+3	39 (Note: Head-to-head points: Tersana 6, ZED 5, Al Merreikh 3.)	
9	ZED	30	9	12	9	26	27	−1	39	
10	Al Merreikh	30	7	18	5	22	20	+2	39	
11	El Sekka El Hadid	30	9	11	10	25	28	−3	38	
12	Al Zarka	30	9	9	12	22	33	−11	36	
13	Gomhoriat Shebin (R)	30	8	11	11	29	30	−1	35	Relegation to the Third Division
14	Sers El Layan (R)	30	8	9	13	24	34	−10	33	Relegation to the Third Division
15	Nogoom (R)	30	7	10	13	23	31	−8	31	Relegation to the Third Division
16	Tanta (R)	30	4	11	15	21	33	−12	23	Relegation to the Third Division

Source: Kooora
Rules for classification: 1) Points; 2) Head-to-Head points; 3) Head-to-Head goal difference; 4) Head-to-Head goals scored; 5) Head-to-Head away goals scored; 6) Goal difference; 7) Goals scored; 8) Draw of lots (only if needed to decide teams for promotion or teams for relegation).
(Note: Head-to-head record is used only after all the matches between the teams in question have been played).
(P) Promoted; (R) Relegated

==== Group C ====
Pos	Team	Pld	W	D	L	GF	GA	GD	Pts	Promotion, qualification or relegation
1	Pharco (P)	30	19	7	4	57	19	+38	64 (Note: Tied on head-to-head points (3), on head-to-head goal difference (0) and on head-to-head goals scored (2). Head-to-head away goals scored: Pharco 1, Haras El Hodoud 0.)	Promotion to the Premier League
2	Haras El Hodoud	30	19	7	4	43	14	+29	64	
3	Baladeyet El Mahalla	30	13	12	5	36	18	+18	51 (Note: Tied on head-to-head points (2), on head-to-head goal difference (0) and on head-to-head goals scored (2). Head-to-head away goals scored: Baladeyet El Mahalla 2, Abou Qir Fertilizers 0.)	
4	Abou Qir Fertilizers	30	14	9	7	44	27	+17	51	
5	Olympic Club	30	12	14	4	41	29	+12	50	
6	El Mansoura	30	10	11	9	23	23	0	41	
7	Dikernis	30	8	14	8	30	27	+3	38 (Note: Head-to-head points: Dikernis 4, El Raja 1.)	
8	El Raja	30	8	14	8	27	31	−4	38	
9	Al Hammam	30	8	11	11	30	34	−4	35	
10	Sporting Alexandria	30	8	10	12	26	32	−6	34	
11	Ala'ab Damanhour	30	7	12	11	25	37	−12	33	
12	Kafr El Sheikh	30	6	14	10	25	31	−6	32	
13	Maleyat Kafr El Zayat (R)	30	6	13	11	25	33	−8	31	Relegation to the Third Division
14	Al Jazeera (R)	30	7	9	14	25	46	−21	30	Relegation to the Third Division
15	Beni Ebeid (R)	30	2	14	14	18	36	−18	20	Relegation to the Third Division
16	Biyala (R)	30	2	11	17	17	55	−38	17	Relegation to the Third Division

Source: Kooora
Rules for classification: 1) Points; 2) Head-to-Head points; 3) Head-to-Head goal difference; 4) Head-to-Head goals scored; 5) Head-to-Head away goals scored; 6) Goal difference; 7) Goals scored; 8) Draw of lots (only if needed to decide teams for promotion or teams for relegation).
(Note: Head-to-head record is used only after all the matches between the teams in question have been played).
(P) Promoted; (R) Relegated

=== Results tables ===
==== Group A ====
Home \ Away	ALU	ASC	ASP	BSU	DAY	EAS	FAY	KIM	MED	MIN	MSS	MYQ	QEN	SOH	THT	TBS
Al Aluminium	—	1–2	1–0	2–0	3–2	2–1	1–1	2–0	3–1	2–2	0–0	1–0	1–0	2–1	3–0	2–0
Asyut Cement	0–1	—	0–1	1–1	3–1	1–1	2–0	0–1	1–2	0–0	2–2	2–0	1–2	0–0	2–1	1–0
Asyut Petroleum	1–0	1–1	—	0–0	4–2	1–2	1–1	2–1	1–1	0–1	1–1	0–0	0–0	1–0	2–1	1–0
Beni Suef	1–0	1–0	0–0	—	0–1	2–1	0–0	1–1	1–1	0–2	1–0	2–1	1–0	2–1	3–0	2–2
Dayrout	1–2	5–1	2–2	1–1	—	3–1	0–2	0–1	2–1	1–3	3–1	1–1	2–2	0–0	1–0	2–1
Eastern Company	2–0	2–0	1–1	2–1	2–2	—	1–0	2–2	1–0	2–2	4–1	0–0	2–0	1–0	5–0	2–3
Faiyum	0–0	2–1	1–0	0–1	2–3	1–2	—	1–1	1–0	0–0	1–2	2–1	0–0	2–1	6–2	0–0
KIMA Aswan	2–3	2–3	0–0	2–0	0–3	1–2	0–0	—	2–0	0–1	2–1	1–0	0–0	0–0	0–1	1–0
Media	1–0	1–0	0–2	2–1	1–0	0–0	1–1	1–1	—	1–1	1–0	2–1	5–0	2–1	3–0	0–0
El Minya	0–0	1–1	1–0	2–2	1–0	0–0	0–1	1–1	1–1	—	4–2	2–0	2–1	1–0	3–1	1–0
MS Samasta	1–0	0–1	0–0	0–1	0–2	1–2	1–0	0–0	1–0	0–1	—	0–0	0–5	1–1	3–0	0–0
Muslim Youths (Qena)	0–0	1–0	0–1	2–1	2–1	2–1	1–2	1–1	0–0	1–1	0–1	—	0–1	1–0	2–1	1–0
Qena	0–2	3–0	1–0	0–2	2–1	0–2	1–2	0–0	1–2	2–0	2–0	1–1	—	1–1	2–1	0–0
Sohag	2–1	1–0	0–1	0–0	1–0	1–2	1–0	2–0	2–1	1–0	1–1	0–0	1–1	—	0–0	1–0
Tahta	1–3	2–2	1–1	2–0	2–2	2–3	0–1	1–4	2–3	1–2	1–1	1–1	2–1	0–1	—	0–1
Telephonat Beni Suef	1–2	1–1	2–1	2–0	1–1	0–1	1–0	2–0	1–1	2–2	0–0	0–0	1–0	0–1	3–1	—

Source: Kooora
Legend: Blue = home team win; Yellow = draw; Red = away team win.
For upcoming matches, an "a" indicates there is an article about the rivalry between the two participants.

==== Group B ====
Home \ Away	COC	DKH	GOM	MER	NAS	NOG	PET	POR	QAN	SKH	SRS	SUE	TNT	TER	ZAR	ZED
Coca-Cola	—	0–0	1–2	1–0	0–2	3–0	1–0	1–1	0–2	1–0	3–0	2–0	1–0	1–2	2–0	0–1
El Dakhleya	1–0	—	0–0	2–2	1–1	0–0	0–0	1–1	3–3	0–1	2–1	2–1	1–0	1–0	1–0	1–1
Gomhoriat Shebin	3–3	0–0	—	0–0	4–2	0–1	1–1	0–1	1–1	1–0	0–1	2–1	0–0	2–1	0–1	2–1
Al Merreikh	0–0	1–0	0–0	—	0–1	1–0	1–1	2–2	1–1	0–0	1–0	0–1	1–0	0–0	0–0	1–1
Al Nasr	0–2	2–0	4–1	1–1	—	2–0	1–0	0–1	1–1	1–2	0–1	4–0	1–4	1–2	1–1	3–0
Nogoom	0–1	1–2	1–0	1–1	1–1	—	2–1	0–1	1–1	0–0	0–0	0–0	1–0	1–0	3–0	1–1
Petrojet	3–0	0–0	0–2	1–1	2–1	2–1	—	1–2	3–1	1–0	1–0	0–0	4–1	0–0	0–2	2–0
Porto Suez	1–1	2–3	1–0	0–1	2–2	2–0	0–1	—	1–0	1–0	2–1	1–0	1–0	1–4	1–1	1–1
El Qanah	0–0	3–1	1–0	1–2	1–2	1–0	1–0	0–0	—	0–0	2–1	0–1	0–0	2–1	0–1	1–0
El Sekka El Hadid	1–2	1–1	1–0	1–1	2–1	3–2	0–0	2–1	0–3	—	0–2	0–2	2–0	0–0	2–0	1–0
Sers El Layan	0–3	1–2	2–2	1–1	0–1	1–0	1–0	0–0	0–0	1–1	—	0–0	2–2	1–0	1–2	2–1
Suez	0–0	0–2	2–1	0–0	1–2	1–1	0–0	1–1	2–1	2–1	0–1	—	1–1	1–0	0–0	1–1
Tanta	1–2	0–1	1–1	0–2	2–2	1–1	0–0	0–0	0–2	0–0	2–0	0–2	—	0–1	2–0	0–0
Tersana	0–1	1–1	1–0	1–1	1–2	1–2	0–1	2–0	0–0	2–2	2–0	0–1	2–1	—	1–0	1–1
Al Zarka	0–1	0–1	0–3	1–0	2–2	2–1	2–1	0–0	1–1	2–2	2–1	1–0	0–2	0–0	—	1–2
ZED	2–0	0–0	1–1	2–0	1–0	2–1	0–2	0–0	0–0	1–0	2–2	0–1	2–1	0–1	2–0	—

Source: Kooora
Legend: Blue = home team win; Yellow = draw; Red = away team win.
For upcoming matches, an "a" indicates there is an article about the rivalry between the two participants.

==== Group C ====
Home \ Away	AQF	ADM	BMH	BEB	BIY	DIK	HAM	HRS	JAZ	KSH	MKZ	MAN	OLY	PHA	RAJ	SPO
Abou Qir Fertilizers	—	0–1	2–2	2–1	3–0	0–0	1–1	1–2	3–1	4–0	0–0	1–0	1–2	0–0	0–0	2–1
Ala'ab Damanhour	1–4	—	1–0	1–1	1–0	0–0	1–0	0–0	2–1	1–1	1–0	0–1	1–1	1–5	1–1	1–1
Baladeyet El Mahalla	0–0	1–0	—	1–1	5–0	2–0	0–0	1–2	1–1	0–0	2–0	1–1	1–1	1–0	2–1	1–0
Beni Ebeid	0–1	1–1	0–1	—	0–1	1–1	0–0	0–4	0–0	0–0	2–3	0–1	0–3	0–0	1–1	1–1
Biyala	0–3	0–0	1–4	1–4	—	0–4	0–0	0–1	3–0	0–0	0–0	0–2	1–2	0–2	0–1	0–0
Dikernis	2–0	1–2	2–1	1–1	3–2	—	2–0	1–3	2–2	1–0	1–1	2–2	0–0	0–1	0–0	2–3
Al Hammam	1–2	1–0	0–0	1–0	3–0	1–1	—	0–1	2–2	1–0	2–2	1–1	1–3	2–2	1–1	2–0
Haras El Hodoud	0–1	3–0	1–2	2–0	2–0	1–0	3–0	—	3–0	0–1	1–1	1–0	1–1	2–1	0–0	1–1
Al Jazeera	0–3	1–0	0–0	1–0	3–3	2–1	2–0	0–1	—	1–2	0–0	1–2	1–2	0–3	1–0	1–0
Kafr El Sheikh	1–2	1–1	0–0	0–1	0–0	0–0	4–0	0–2	1–1	—	1–1	1–1	1–0	2–2	0–0	0–1
Maleyat Kafr El Zayat	2–3	1–1	0–1	2–1	1–1	0–1	1–0	1–1	1–2	2–0	—	0–0	3–2	0–2	0–0	2–1
El Mansoura	1–1	1–0	0–0	1–0	0–0	1–0	0–1	0–1	2–0	0–3	1–0	—	0–0	0–1	0–0	2–1
Olympic Club	0–0	3–3	2–1	1–1	1–1	1–1	2–1	0–1	1–0	4–2	0–0	2–2	—	1–0	3–2	0–0
Pharco	3–1	4–2	2–1	3–0	6–1	0–0	2–0	1–0	4–0	1–2	3–0	2–0	1–1	—	1–1	3–1
El Raja	3–2	2–1	0–3	0–0	2–2	0–1	1–7	1–1	3–0	2–0	1–0	2–1	0–1	0–1	—	1–0
Sporting Alexandria	2–1	1–0	0–1	1–1	2–0	0–0	0–1	0–2	1–1	2–2	2–1	1–0	2–1	0–1	1–1	—

Source: Kooora
Legend: Blue = home team win; Yellow = draw; Red = away team win.
For upcoming matches, an "a" indicates there is an article about the rivalry between the two participants.

== Number of teams by governorate ==
Number of teams	Governorate	Team(s)
5	Alexandria	Abou Qir Fertilizers, Haras El Hodoud, Olympic Club, Pharco and Sporting Alexandria
5	Cairo	Coca-Cola, El Dakhleya, Al Nasr, El Sekka El Hadid and ZED
4	Giza	Eastern Company, Media, Nogoom and Tersana
3	Asyut	Asyut Cement, Asyut Petroleum and Dayrout
3	Beni Suef	Beni Suef, MS Samasta and Telephonat Beni Suef
3	El Dakahlia	Beni Ebeid, Dikernis and El Mansoura
3	El Gharbia	Baladeyet El Mahalla, Maleyat Kafr El Zayat and Tanta
3	Matruh	Al Hammam, Al Jazeera and El Raja
3	Qena	Al Aluminium, Muslim Youths (Qena) and Qena
3	Suez	Petrojet, Porto Suez and Suez
2	Kafr El Sheikh	Biyala and Kafr El Sheikh
2	El Monufia	Gomhoriat Shebin and Sers El Layan
2	Sohag	Sohag and Tahta
1	Aswan	KIMA Aswan
1	El Beheira	Ala'ab Damanhour
1	Damietta	Al Zarka
1	Faiyum	Faiyum
1	Ismailia	El Qanah
1	El Minya	El Minya
1	Port Said	Al Merreikh
