= 2024–25 Egypt Cup =

Tournament details
- Dates: 23 November 2024 – 5 June 2025
- Teams: 110

Final positions
- Champions: Zamalek (29th title)
- Runners-up: Pyramids

The 2024–25 Egypt Cup was the 93rd edition of the premier knockout football competition in Egypt, organized by the Egyptian Football Association (EFA). The tournament began on 23 November 2024.

Zamalek triumphed over the defending champions Pyramids with an 8–7 victory on penalties after a 1–1 draw, securing a place in the Egyptian Super Cup.

== Format ==
The competition begins with a first preliminary round featuring 72 teams. Nile Premier League clubs will enter the tournament at the Round of 32. Extra time will only be applied starting from the Round of 32, and VAR (Video Assistant Referee) technology is not utilized in single-elimination knockout rounds.

== Schedule ==
Round	Draw date	Matches
First preliminary round	10 November 2024	23–25 November 2024
Second preliminary round	2 December 2024	7–9 December 2024
Third preliminary round	12 December 2024	15–16 December 2024
Fourth preliminary round	18 December 2024	26 December 2024–2 January 2025
Round of 32	28 December 2024	2–9 January, 4 February 2025
Round of 16	28 December 2024	16–17 January, 3 February, 7–8 March 2025

== Matches ==
=== First preliminary round ===
The draw took place on 10 November 2024. The matches are scheduled to be held from 23 to 25 November.

25 November 2024	Ittihad El Shorta	0–0 (4–5 p)	El Sharkia Lel Dokhan
14:00

23 November 2024	Delphi	3–0	Al Tarbia wel Taaleem	Alexandria
14:00	Moataz Ismail; Amr Mutawa; Azima			Stadium: Alexandria University

23 November 2024	Olympic	3–1	Samanoud	Alexandria
14:00	Raymond Manga; Ahmed Essam; Khaled Essam (pen.)			Stadium: Olympic Club

24 November 2024	Masr Lel Taamin	1–1 (4–2 p)	Samanoud Youth
14:00

25 November 2024	Nogoom	3–0	Batta Youth
14:00

25 November 2024	El Entag El Harby	6–0	Al Batal Al Olimbi	Cairo
14:00				Stadium: Al Salam Stadium

24 November 2024	Alo Egypt	0–0 (5–6 p)	Al Nasr Lel Tasdir
14:00

24 November 2024	Ashab Aljead	3–0	New Giza	Alexandria
15:00				Stadium: Alexandria University

25 November 2024	El Shams	2–0	Esco	Cairo
14:00				Stadium: El Shams Stadium

24 November 2024	Mega Sport	1–3	Ittihad Basyion	Mansoura
14:00				Stadium: Sherbin Stadium

23 November 2024	Tala'ea El Ustool	0–0 (– p)	Madinat Nasr	Alexandria
14:00				Stadium: Naval Forces Stadium

24 November 2024	Al Nasr	3–1	Pyramids Gardens
14:00

24 November 2024	Gomhoriat Shebin	2–1	Ras El Bar
14:00

23 November 2024	Team FC	2–1	Helwan El Aam
14:00

24 November 2024	Al Uboor	3–1	Shooting Club Dokki
14:00

24 November 2024	Banha	0–1	Shabab Qalyob
14:00

23 November 2024	Said El Mahalla	2–2 (7–6 p)	Qaleen Youth Center	El Mahalla El Kubra
14:00

25 November 2024	Port Fouad	0–0 (4–5 p)	Porto Suez	Port Fuad
14:00

24 November 2024	6 October, North Sinai	2–1	Alexandria Petroleum
14:00

23 November 2024	Maleyat Kafr El Zayat	1–0	Belbeis
14:00	Mahmoud Shehab 50' (pen.)

23 November 2024	Al Hammam	0–0 (8–7 p)	Heliopolis
14:00

23 November 2024	Damanhour	0–1	Smart	Damanhour
14:00				Stadium: Beheira Water Company Stadium

23 November 2024	Pioneers	1–2	El Marg	Cairo
14:00			Islam El-Tetsh 71'; Mohamed Montaser 78'	Stadium: Dar Al-Madfa'iya Stadium

24 November 2024	El Plastic	0–0 (1–4 p)	Raa
14:00

23 November 2024	Dekernes	1–2	Tayaran	Dekernes
14:00	Omar Ezzat 15'		Yasser El Shahat 28', 90+1' (pen.)	Stadium: Hamdino Abdel Jalil Stadium

25 November 2024	South Sinai	2–2 (5–4 p)	Sherbeen
14:00

24 November 2024	Al Merreikh	1–0	Minyat Samanoud	Port Said
14:00	Mohamed Farrag			Stadium: Al Merreikh Stadium

24 November 2024	Sinai Star	0–0 (3–5 p)	Badr	Al Qalyubiyah
14:00				Stadium: Bahtim Stadium

24 November 2024	Sharkia	1–0	Shabab Qasta	Hihya
14:00				Stadium: Hihya Youth Stadium

24 November 2024	Eastern Company	3–0	Ahli Al-Mallaha	Faculty of Agriculture Stadium
14:00	Abdulrahman 41'; Hassan 60'; Maher 90' (pen.)

25 November 2024	Levels	0–0 (2–4 p)	Maadi & Yacht	Third Al Salam
14:00

25 November 2024	Egypt Stars	0–0 (– p)	Seela	Al Wasta
14:00				Stadium: Egypt Stars

25 November 2024	Misr Lel Makkasa	0–0 (1–3 p)	Golden Gate	Beni Suef
14:00				Stadium: Assiouty Sport Stadium

23 November 2024	Telephonat Beni Suef	0–0 (5–4 p)	Beni Suef
14:00

25 November 2024	Masar	3–1	Aamlin Gharb	Right to Dream
14:00

25 November 2024	Al Wasta	3–0	Shabab Snouris	Beni Suef
14:00				Stadium: Al Wasta

25 November 2024	Fayoum	w/o	Ahly Al-Gharq	Giza
14:00				Stadium: Faculty of Agriculture Stadium
Note: The match was canceled due to the unavailability of a venue.

=== Second preliminary round ===
7 December 2024	Al Hammam	1–0	Smart
14:00

7 December 2024	Delphi	1–0	Shabab Qalyob	Alexandria
14:00				Stadium: Alexandria University

7 December 2024	Seid El Mahalla	1–0	Porto Suez
14:00

8 December 2024	Ashab Aljead	1–1 (– p)	El Marg	Alexandria
14:00				Stadium: Alexandria University

8 December 2024	El Entag El Harby	3–1	El Sharkia Lel Dokhan	Cairo
14:00				Stadium: Al Salam Stadium

8 December 2024	Al Merreikh	2–0	Al Nasr Lel Tasdir	Al Merreikh Stadium
14:00

8 December 2024	Nogoom	3–3 (– p)	Ittihad Basyion
14:00

8 December 2024	Sharkia	0–0 (– p)	Maadi & Yacht	Hihya
14:00				Stadium: Hihya Youth Stadium

8 December 2024	Masr Lel Taamin	2–1	Badr	Masr Lel Taamin
14:00

8 December 2024	Eastern Company	1–1 (– p)	Madinat Nasr
14:00

8 December 2024	Al Nasr	3–3 (– p)	Olympic
14:00

8 December 2024	El Shams	4–0	South Sinai
14:00

9 December 2024	6 October, North Sinai	1–1 (– p)	Raa
14:00

9 December 2024	Masar	–	Tayaran
14:00

9 December 2024	Al Wasta	2–2 (2–1 p)	Seela	Beni Suef
14:00				Stadium: Al Wasta

9 December 2024	Asmant Asyut	0–0 (4–3 p)	Ahly Al-Gharq	Asyut
14:00				Stadium: Asmant Asyut Stadium

9 December 2024	KIMA Aswan	2–2 (– p)	Golden Gate	Aswan
14:00				Stadium: Aswan Stadium

9 December 2024	Al Nasr Lel Taa'den	0–0 (– p)	Al Aluminium	Al Nasr Lel Taa'den
14:00

=== Third preliminary round ===
15 December 2024	Maleyat Kafr El Zayat	1–1 (a.e.t.) (3–5 p)	El Marg

15 December 2024	Gomhoriat Shebin	0–0 (a.e.t.) (4–5 p)	Raa

15 December 2024	El Shams	2–0	Seid El Mahalla

15 December 2024	Masr Lel Taamin	1–1 (a.e.t.) (4–5 p)	Al Hammam

15 December 2024	Al Merreikh	0–3	Olympic

15 December 2024	Sharkia	0–2	Delphi

15 December 2024	Nogoom	2–4	Al Uboor

16 December 2024	El Entag El Harby	1–0	Madinat Nasr

16 December 2024	El Minya	2–3	Golden Gate

16 December 2024	Al Wasta	2–0	Asmant Asyut

16 December 2024	Al Nasr Lel Taa'den	3–0	Telephonat Beni Suef

16 December 2024	Masar	0–0 (a.e.t.) (3–4 p)	Team FC

=== Fourth preliminary round ===
26 December 2024	Tersana	3–1	Al Uboor
14:00

26 December 2024	Al Mokawloon Al Arab	1–1 (– p)	El Entag El Harby	Cairo
14:00				Stadium: Osman Ahmed Osman Stadium

26 December 2024	Wadi Degla	1–0	El Sekka El Hadid
14:00

26 December 2024	Proxy	0–0 (– p)	Olympic
14:00

26 December 2024	El Qanah	3–1	El Marg

26 December 2024	El Dakhleya	2–3	Team FC

26 December 2024	Montakhab Suez	0–0 (– p)	Raa

26 December 2024	El Mansoura	2–1	Delphi

26 December 2024	Tanta SC	3–2	Raya

26 December 2024	Petrol Asyut	1–0	Golden Gate

26 December 2024	Dayrout	2–1	Al Wasta

26 December 2024	La Viena	1–0	Al Nasr Lel Taa'den

2 January 2025	Etisalat	1–1 (2–3 p)	El Shams
14:00

2 January 2025	Alexandria Sporting	1–1 (5–4 p)	Al Hammam
14:00

2 January 2025	Abu Qair Semad	3–0	Baladiyat El Mahalla
14:00

=== Round of 32 ===
The draw took place on 28 December 2024. The record title-holder, Al Ahly SC, was disqualified due to withdrawing from the previous edition.

2 January 2025	Petrojet	0–0 (a.e.t.) (3–4 p)	Al Mokawloon Al Arab	Cairo
14:30				Stadium: Petrosport Stadium; Referee: Mostafa El Shahdi
	Penalties
	Bamba (penalty missed); Mohamed (penalty missed); Hamdan (penalty scored); Farag (penalty scored); Bahbah (penalty scored)		(penalty scored) Al Badry; (penalty missed) El Kadi; (penalty scored) Ochaya; (penalty scored) Manga; (penalty scored) Ojera

2 January 2025	ZED	3–1	Dayrout	Cairo
14:30	Sawaneh 6'; Samir 83' (pen.); Hany 90+2'		Ajeeb 43'	Stadium: Cairo International Stadium; Referee: Ahmed Hamed Fahim

3 January 2025	Pharco	3–1	Tersana	Alexandria
14:30	Sherif 45+1'; Reda 48'; Ndiaye 64'		Khaled 72'	Stadium: Haras El Hodoud Stadium; Referee: Mahmoud Rushdi

3 January 2025	El Gouna	2–0	El Qanah	El Gouna
14:30	Akem 44'; Shika 61'			Stadium: Khaled Bichara Stadium; Referee: Atef Hussein

3 January 2025	ENPPI	1–0	Haras El Hodoud	Cairo
14:30	Hawash 48'			Stadium: Petrosport Stadium; Referee: Mohamed Abbas Qabil

3 January 2025	Tala'ea El Gaish	2–2 (a.e.t.) (4–3 p)	Olympic	Cairo
14:30	Fathy 27'; Omran 87' (pen.)		El Malek 90+1'; Ishaq 90+8'	Stadium: Gehaz El Reyada Stadium; Referee: Sayed Shaaban

4 January 2025	Ismaily	1–0	Tanta	Ismailia
14:30	El Malawany 28'			Stadium: Ismailia Stadium; Referee: Mahmoud Desouky

4 January 2025	National Bank	1–0	Petrol Asyut	Cairo
14:30	Faisal 79' (pen.)			Stadium: Cairo International Stadium; Referee: Mohamed El Atbany

4 January 2025	Smouha	1–0	Suez	Alexandria
17:30	Salem 45+3'			Stadium: Alexandria Stadium; Referee: El Sayed Mounir

4 January 2025	Ceramica Cleopatra	3–0	La Viena	Cairo
17:30	Magdy 31'; Belhadji 49'; Moka 84'			Stadium: Osman Ahmed Osman Stadium; Referee: Hosni Sultan

5 January 2025	Ghazl El Mahalla	1–0	Sporting Alexandria	El Mahalla El Kubra
14:30	Essam 45+3'			Stadium: Ghazl El Mahalla Stadium; Referee: Ahmed Hamdy

5 January 2025	Modern Sport	5–2 (a.e.t.)	El Shams	Cairo
14:30	Atef 31' (pen.), 105+1'; Desouky 41' (pen.); Gomma 98'; El Sayed 120+1'		Saad 4' (pen.); Ibrahim 13'	Stadium: Cairo International Stadium; Referee: Mohamed Youssef

5 January 2025	Al Ittihad	0–2	Team FC	Alexandria
16:30			Saber 10', 36' (pen.)	Stadium: Alexandria Stadium; Referee: Galal Ahmed

9 January 2025	Zamalek	2–0	Abu Qair Semad	Cairo
14:30	Zizo 21'; Shalaby 90+2'			Stadium: Cairo International Stadium; Referee: Ibrahim Mohamed

4 February 2025	Al Masry	1–0	Wadi Degla	Suez
14:30	El Ghandour 82'			Stadium: Suez Stadium

4 February 2025	Pyramids	3–0	El Mansoura	Cairo
17:30	Ibrahim 21' (o.g.); Obama 90+2'; Hamdy 90+5'			Stadium: 30 June Stadium

=== Round of 16 ===
16 January 2025	ENPPI	1–0	Ismaily	Cairo
14:30 UTC+2	Ammar 6' (o.g.)			Stadium: Petrosport Stadium

17 January 2025	Ceramica Cleopatra	2–0	Tala'ea El Gaish	Cairo
15:00 UTC+2	Zalaka 47'; Lakay 62'			Stadium: Osman Ahmed Osman Stadium

17 January 2025	Smouha	1–0	ZED	Alexandria
17:30 UTC+2	Salem 8'			Stadium: Borg El Arab Stadium

2 March 2025	El Gouna	3–1	Team FC	El Gouna
14:30 UTC+2	Akem 60'; Reda 86'; ElAlamy 90+5'		Tawfiq 90'	Stadium: Khaled Bichara Stadium

7 March 2025	Zamalek	2–1 (a.e.t.)	Modern Sport	Cairo
21:30 UTC+2	Emad 5'; Shikabala 106'		Zaddem 52'	Stadium: Cairo International Stadium

7 March 2025	National Bank	3–1	Al Masry	Suez
21:30 UTC+2	Faisal 23'; Annor 27'; Grendo 90+5'		Ebuka 90+2'	Stadium: Suez Stadium

8 March 2025	Pyramids	2–0	Al Mokawloon Al Arab	Cairo
21:30 UTC+2	Obama 48'; Atef 85'			Stadium: 30 June Stadium

8 March 2025	Ghazl El Mahalla	1–0 (a.e.t.)	Pharco	El Mahalla
21:30 UTC+2	Mayhoub 118'			Stadium: El Mahalla Stadium

=== Quarter-finals ===
15 March 2025	Pyramids	2–1	ENPPI	Cairo
21:30 UTC+2	Fathi 15'; Obama 90+8'		El Agouz 53'	Stadium: 30 June Stadium

15 March 2025	Ghazl El Mahalla	0–1 (a.e.t.)	National Bank	El Mahalla
21:30 UTC+2			Faisal 120+2'	Stadium: El Mahalla Stadium

15 March 2025	Zamalek	4–2	Smouha	Cairo
21:30 UTC+2	Jaziri 12'; Haggag 59'; Bentayg 61'; Shalaby 90+5'		Mostafa 25'; Salem 45+2'	Stadium: Cairo International Stadium

15 March 2025	Ceramica Cleopatra	3–1	El Gouna	Cairo
21:30 UTC+2	Belhadji 29', 33', 59'		Shousha 48'	Stadium: Osman Ahmed Osman Stadium

=== Semi-finals ===
28 March 2025	Pyramids	4–0	National Bank	Cairo
21:30 UTC+2	Mayele 13'; Atef 18'; Touré 25'; Sobhi 63'			Stadium: 30 June Stadium

28 March 2025	Zamalek	2–1	Ceramica Cleopatra	Cairo
21:30 UTC+2	A. Said 33'; Zizo 90'		Mukka 58'	Stadium: Cairo International Stadium

=== Final ===
5 June 2025	Zamalek	1–1 (a.e.t.) (8–7 p)	Pyramids	Cairo
20:30 UTC+3	Mansi 78'		A. Atef 29'	Stadium: Cairo International Stadium; Attendance: 23000; Referee: Mahmoud Bassiouni
	Penalties
	(penalty scored) Abdelmaguid; (penalty scored) Shehata; (penalty scored) Bentayg; (penalty scored) Mah. Hamdy; (penalty missed) Shalaby; (penalty scored) Maher; (penalty missed) Mansi; (penalty scored) El Zenary; (penalty scored) Abou El Fotouh; (penalty scored) Shikabala		(penalty scored) Hafez; (penalty missed) Fathi; (penalty scored) Mar. Hamdy; (penalty scored) Tawfik; (penalty scored) Obama; (penalty scored) El Karti; (penalty missed) Samy; (penalty scored) Touré; (penalty scored) Moh. Hamdy; (penalty missed) Gabr
