= 2020–21 Aswan SC season =

Aswan SC
2020–21 season
- Manager: Sami El-Sheshini (until 10 January)
- Stadium: Aswan Stadium
- Egyptian Premier League: 18th (relegated)
- Egypt Cup: Semi-finals

The 2020–21 season was the 91st season in the history of the Aswan SC, and the club's second consecutive season in the Egyptian Premier League. In addition to the domestic league, the team participated in the Egypt Cup.

== Competitions ==
=== Overall record ===
| Competition | First match | Last match | Starting round | Final position | Record | | | | | | | |
| Competition | First match | Last match | Starting round | Final position | Pld | W | D | L | GF | GA | GD | Win % |
|---|---|---|---|---|---|---|---|---|---|---|---|---|
| Egyptian Premier League | 11 December 2020 | | Matchday 1 | 18th | 34 | 6 | 9 | 19 | 29 | 61 | −32 | 17.65 |
| Egypt Cup | | | | | 0 | 0 | 0 | 0 | 0 | 0 | +0 | — |
| Total | | | | | 34 | 6 | 9 | 19 | 29 | 61 | −32 | 17.65 |

Source: Competitions

=== Egyptian Premier League ===
==== League table ====
| Pos | Team | Pld | W | D | L | GF | GA | GD | Pts | Qualification or relegation |
|---|---|---|---|---|---|---|---|---|---|---|
| 14 | National Bank of Egypt | 34 | 6 | 17 | 11 | 39 | 44 | −5 | 35 | |
| 15 | Ghazl El Mahalla | 34 | 7 | 14 | 13 | 28 | 41 | −13 | 35 | |
| 16 | Wadi Degla (R) | 34 | 5 | 15 | 14 | 29 | 38 | −9 | 30 | Relegation to the Second Division |
| 17 | El Entag El Harby (R) | 34 | 5 | 13 | 16 | 35 | 60 | −25 | 28 | Relegation to the Second Division |
| 18 | Aswan (R) | 34 | 6 | 9 | 19 | 29 | 61 | −32 | 27 | Relegation to the Second Division |

Source: Soccerway
Rules for classification: 1) Points; 2) Head-to-Head points; 3) Head-to-Head goal difference; 4) Head-to-Head goals scored; 5) Head-to-Head away goals scored; 6) Goal difference; 7) Goals scored.
(Note: Head-to-head record is used only after all the matches between the teams in question have been played).
(R) Relegated

==== Results summary ====
| Overall | | | | | | | | Home | | | | | | Away | | | | | |
| Pld | W | D | L | GF | GA | GD | Pts | W | D | L | GF | GA | GD | W | D | L | GF | GA | GD |
|---|---|---|---|---|---|---|---|---|---|---|---|---|---|---|---|---|---|---|---|
| 0 | 0 | 0 | 0 | 0 | 0 | 0 | 0 | 0 | 0 | 0 | 0 | 0 | 0 | 0 | 0 | 0 | 0 | 0 | 0 |

==== Results by round ====
| Round | 1 | 2 | 3 | 4 | 5 | 6 | 7 | 8 | 9 | 10 | 11 | 12 |
|---|---|---|---|---|---|---|---|---|---|---|---|---|
| Ground | A | H | A | H | H | A | A | A | H | A | H | A |
| Result | W | W | L | L | L | L | D | W | D | D | D | D |
| Position | | | | | | | | | | | | |

A = Away; H = Home; W = Win; D = Draw; L = Loss

==== Matches ====
The match schedule was released on 23 November 2020.

| 11 December 2020 1 | ENPPI | 0–1 | Aswan | Cairo |
| | | | | Stadium: Petrosport Stadium |

| 16 December 2020 2 | Aswan | 2–1 | Tala'ea El Gaish | Cairo |
| | | | | Stadium: Petrosport Stadium |

| 21 December 2020 3 | Al Masry | 3–0 | Aswan | Alexandria |
| | | | | Stadium: Borg El Arab Stadium |

| 25 December 2020 4 | Aswan | 0–1 | El Gouna | Cairo |
| | | | | Stadium: El Sekka El Hadid Stadium |

| 29 December 2020 5 | Aswan | 0–2 | Ismaily | Cairo |
| | | | | Stadium: El Sekka El Hadid Stadium |

| 9 January 2021 6 | Misr Lel Makkasa | 1–0 | Aswan | Cairo |
| | | | | Stadium: Osman Ahmed Osman Stadium |

| 14 January 2021 7 | Ghazl El Mahalla | 1–1 | Aswan | El Mahalla El Kubra |
| | | | | Stadium: Ghazl El Mahalla Stadium |

| 23 January 2021 9 | Aswan | 0–0 | Zamalek | Cairo |
| | | | | Stadium: Petrosport Stadium |

| 29 January 2021 10 | Wadi Degla | 0–0 | Aswan | Cairo |
| | | | | Stadium: Al Salam Stadium |

| 2 February 2021 11 | Aswan | 1–1 | Ceramica Cleopatra | Cairo |
| | | | | Stadium: Petrosport Stadium |

| 6 February 2021 12 | El Entag El Harby SC | 1–1 | Aswan | Cairo |
| | | | | Stadium: Al Salam Stadium |

| 21 February 2021 8 | Al Ittihad | 1–3 | Aswan | Alexandria |
| | | | | Stadium: Alexandria Stadium |

=== Egypt Cup ===
| 24 February 2021 Round of 32 | Aswan | 3–1 | Sohag SC |

| 23 April 2021 Round of 16 | Aswan | 1–0 | El Gouna |

| 31 May 2021 Quarter-finals | Aswan | 2–2 (a.e.t.) (5–4 p) | Al Masry | Alexandria |
| | | | | Stadium: Alexandria Stadium |
