= Ahmed Mahmoud Ahmed =

Egyptian footballer (born 2003)

Ahmed Mahmoud Ahmed (Arabic: أحمد محمود احمد; born 1 January 2003) is an Egyptian professional footballer who plays as a defender for Egyptian Premier League club Al Ittihad Alexandria on loan from Zamalek.

== Honours ==
Zamalek

- Egypt Cup: 2024–25
