= Abou Sakal FC =

Egyptian football club

Abou Sakal
- Full name: Abou Sakal Football Club
- Short name: ABS
- Founded: 1960; 65 years ago
- League: Egyptian Third Division

Abou Sakal Football Club (Arabic: نادي أبي صقل لكرة القدم), is an Egyptian football club based in Sinai, Egypt. The club currently plays in the Egyptian Third Division, the third-highest league in the Egyptian football league system.
