= MS Tala =

Egyptian sports club

- Full name: Markaz Shabab Tala
- Short name: MST
- Founded: 1976; 49 years ago
- Ground: MS Tala Stadium
- Chairman: Al Ahmadi Abdel Ghaffar
- Manager: Mohamed Ismail
- League: Egyptian Third Division
- 2017–18: Third Division, 1st (Group G) (promoted)

MS Tala (Arabic: مركز شباب تلا), also known as Tala Youth Center, or simply Tala YC, is an Egyptian sports club based in Tala, El Monufia, Egypt. The club is mainly known for its football team, which currently plays in the Egyptian Third Division, the third-highest league in the Egyptian football league system.

The club became popular after reaching the round of 32 of the 2013 Egypt Cup, where they played against defending champions ENPPI and lost 1–0.

The club was promoted to the Egyptian Second Division for the first time in their history during the 2013–14 season of the Egyptian Third Division, but failed to stay in the Second Division for more than one season and were relegated to the Third Division. Five years later, the club was promoted to the Egyptian Second Division for the second time after securing 2017–18 Egyptian Third Division Group G promotion spot by defeating Mega Sport 3–2.

== Current squad ==
As of 1 August 2018.

Note: Flags indicate national team as defined under FIFA eligibility rules; some limited exceptions apply. Players may hold more than one non-FIFA nationality.

No.	Pos.	Nation	Player
—	GK	(Egypt) EGY	Islam Alam El Din
—	GK	(Egypt) EGY	Mahmoud Hamdy
—	GK	(Egypt) EGY	Walid Shaaban
—	DF	(Egypt) EGY	Hesham Abdel Raouf
—	DF	(Egypt) EGY	Khaled El Daba'a
—	DF	(Egypt) EGY	Mohamed Kamal
—	DF	(Egypt) EGY	Osama El Libiy
—	DF	(Egypt) EGY	Ahmed Lotfi
—	DF	(Egypt) EGY	Gamal Shaaban
—	DF	(Egypt) EGY	Mohamed El Shafey ^{(captain)}
—	MF	(Egypt) EGY	El Sayed Abdel Ghafar
—	MF	(Egypt) EGY	Mohamed El Marakby

No.	Pos.	Nation	Player
—	MF	(Egypt) EGY	Said El Mashd
—	MF	(Egypt) EGY	Mohamed Rahrah
—	MF	(Nigeria) NGA	Oulani Said
—	MF	(Egypt) EGY	Basem Shawky
—	MF	(Egypt) EGY	Ibrahim El Sheshtawy
—	MF	(Ghana) GHA	Nana Vidial
—	MF	(Egypt) EGY	Mahmoud El Zelzaly
—	FW	(Egypt) EGY	Saad El Basily
—	FW	(Egypt) EGY	Ahmed Beko
—	FW	(Egypt) EGY	Ahmed Gamal
—	FW	(Egypt) EGY	Attia Al Nashwy
—	FW	(Egypt) EGY	Karim Yassin
