= Azmi Ghouma =

Tunisian footballer (born 1998)

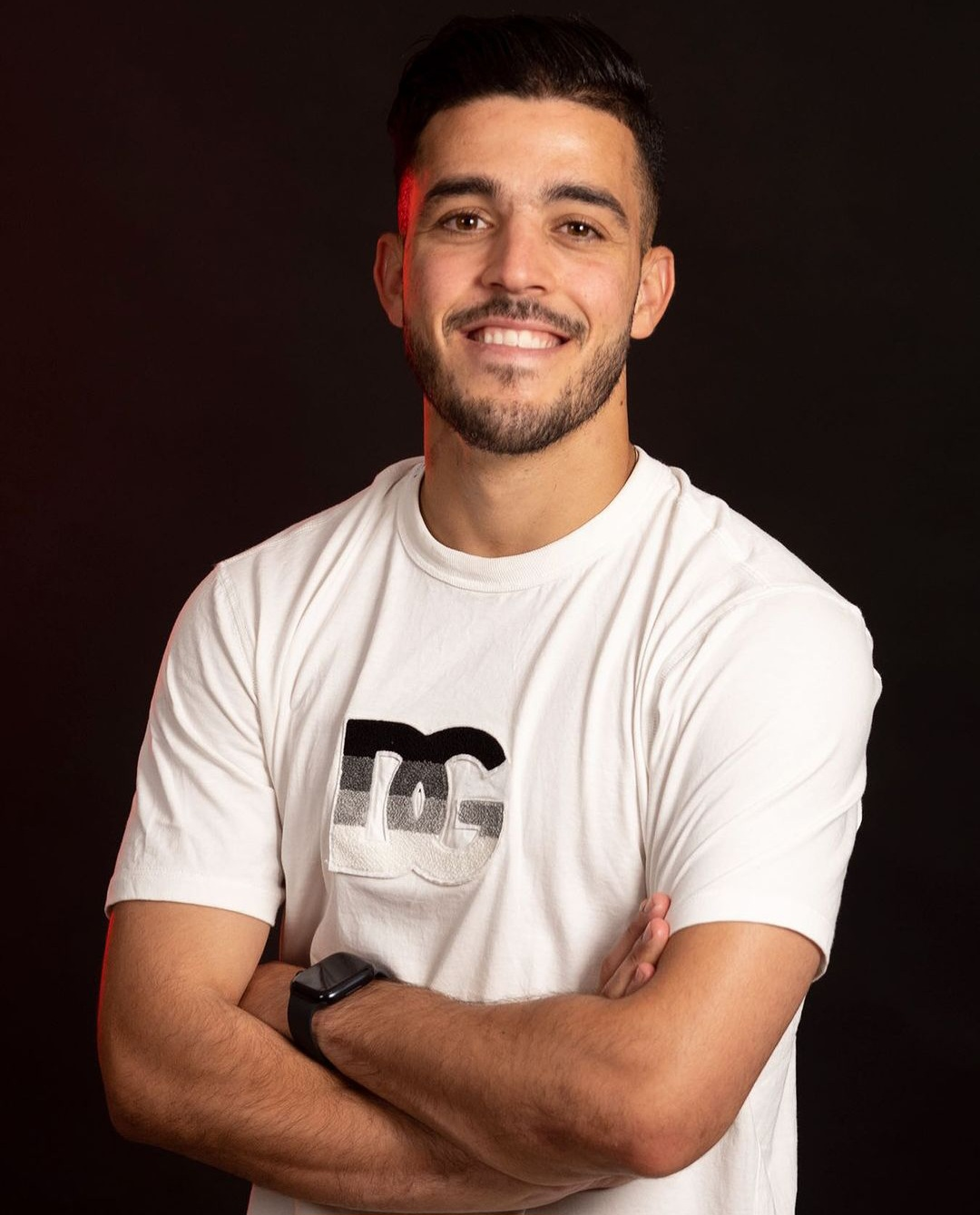
- Ghouma in 2023.

Personal information
- Date of birth: 27 February 1998 (age 28)
- Place of birth: Sfax, Tunisia
- Height: 1.70 m (5 ft 7 in)
- Position: Left-back

Team information
- Current team: Pharco FC

Youth career
- 2010–2018: CS Sfaxien

Senior career*
Years	Team	Apps	(Gls)
2018–2021	CS Sfaxien	32	(1)
2021–	Pharco FC	97	(1)
- * Club domestic league appearances and goals as of 13 August 2025 @ 13:35(AEST)

Azmi Ghouma (born 27 February 1998; Arabic: عزمي غومة) is a Tunisian professional footballer who plays as a left-back for Pharco FC.

== Career ==
He began with CS Sfaxien, where he passed all categories.

At the end of 2021, he signed a contract with the Pharco FC team until 2025.

== Honours ==
CS Sfaxien

- Tunisian Cup (2)
