= Eastern Company SC =

Association football club in Cairo, Egypt

- Full name: Eastern Company Sporting Club نادي إيستيرن كومباني للألعاب الرياضية
- Short name: EAC
- Founded: 1953; 73 years ago
- Ground: Eastern Company Stadium
- League: Egyptian Second Division (Group B)
- 2021–22: First Division, 17th (relegated)
Home colours	Away colours

Eastern Company Sporting Club (Arabic: نادي الشرقية "إيسترن كومباني" للألعاب الرياضية) is an Egyptian football club based in Cairo, Egypt. The club is related to the tobacco company, Eastern Company (El Sharkia Lel Dokhan).

The club currently plays in the Egyptian Second Division, the second highest in the Egyptian football league system.

Eastern Company SC also has a basketball team that plays in the Egyptian Basketball Premier League as of the 2023–24 season.

== History ==
The club used to play in the Egyptian Second Division, the second-highest league in the Egyptian football league system. However, Eastern Company were promoted to the 2021–22 Egyptian Premier League for the first time in their history, as they finished top of their group in the 2020–21 Egyptian Second Division.

== Current squad ==
Note: Flags indicate national team as defined under FIFA eligibility rules; some limited exceptions apply. Players may hold more than one non-FIFA nationality.

No.	Pos.	Nation	Player
—	FW	EGY	Ayman El Ghobashy
