= Mohamed El-Bassiouni =

Egyptian water polo player (born 1948)

Personal information
- Nationality: Egyptian
- Born: 3 May 1948 (age 77) Cairo, Egypt

Sport
- Sport: Water polo

Mohamed El-Bassiouni (born 3 May 1948) is an Egyptian water polo player. He competed in the men's tournament at the 1968 Summer Olympics.
