= El Tahrir SC =

Egyptian football club

- Full name: El Tahrir Aswan Sporting Club نادي التحرير الرياضي بأسوان
- Short name: THR
- Ground: El Tahrir Stadium
- Chairman: Tarek Selim
- Manager: Mohamed Abdullah
- League: Egyptian Second Division
- 2017–18: Third Division, 1st (Group A)

El Tahrir Aswan Sporting Club (Arabic: نادي التحرير الرياضي بأسوان), is an Egyptian football club based in Aswan, Egypt. The club plays in the Egyptian Second Division, the second-highest league in the Egyptian football league system.
