= Egyptian Third Division =

Fourth tier of Egyptian league football

- Organising body: Egyptian Football Association
- Founded: 1948
- First season: 1948–49
- Country: Egypt
- Number of clubs: 142 (2022–23)
- Level on pyramid: 4
- Promotion to: Egyptian Second Division B
- Relegation to: Egyptian Fourth Division
- Domestic cup: Egypt Cup
- International cup(s): CAF Confederation Cup (via winning Egypt Cup)
- Current: 2025-26 Egyptian Third Division

The Egyptian Third Division (Arabic: دوري القسم الثالث المصري) is an Egyptian professional football league that represented the third tier of the Egyptian football league system until 2023. It is administered by the Egyptian Football Association. It is below the Egyptian Second Division, and above the regional league Egyptian Fourth Division; the lowest football league in the country.

Founded in 1948, the league was reformed in 1977, and consists of multiple groups covering different parts of Egypt, with the winner of each group either gaining automatic promotion to the next level, or earning a place in the promotion play-offs, depending on the number of groups and teams participating.

Following the creation of the Second Division A and Second Division B, the Third Division will be downgraded to level 4 on the pyramid starting from the 2023–24 season.

== League format ==
The number of participating teams differs from a season to another, but the format is always the same. Teams are divided into multiple groups, usually from 12 to 14, with each group containing a different number of clubs, according to their geographical location. Teams finishing first in each group either gain automatic promotion, or enter a promotion play-off phase, to determine the promoted teams to the next level; while the lowest or the two lowest-ranked teams in each group relegate to the Egyptian Fourth Division.

For the 2022–23 season, a total of 142 teams participated in the competition, divided into 13 groups, with the first team from all groups (except H2) qualifying for the promotion play-offs. Like other divisions in Egypt, it will take place annually, beginning in September or October, and ending in June of the following year. Teams play each other twice, home and away. All teams are eligible to participate in the Egypt Cup, in case they pay the entrance fee.

== Participating teams ==
Club	Home City	First season of current spell
Al Badari SC	El Badari	2009–10
Quos FC	Qus	2009–10
Beni Suef SC	Beni Suef	2009–10
Desouk SC	Desouk	2009–10
Mnouf FC	Menouf	2009–10
Misr Insurance FC	Cairo	2009–10
Ghazl El Suez FC	Suez	2009–10
Talkha Electricity FC	Talkha	2009–10
El Henawy FC	–	2009–10
Damietta SC	Damietta	2009–10
Madina Monowara	Luxor	2010–11
Wadi El Gedid FC	New Valley Governorate	2010–11
Shouban Qenah	Qena	2010–11
Al-Sekka Al-Hadid	Cairo	2010–11
Gomhoriat Shebin SC	Shibin El Kom	2010–11
Banha FC	Banha	2010–11
Senbellawein FC	El Senbellawein	2010–11
Al Zarka SC	El Zarqa	2010–11
Kafr El Sheikh SC	Kafr El-Sheikh	2010–11
Wadi El Gedid FC	New Valley Governorate	2010–11
El Marg SC	Cairo	2012–13

This list is not inclusive. Please expand it if you can.

== Groups Season 2018–19 ==
Group 1 – Aswan	Group 2 – Sohag	Group 3 – Asyut	Group 4 – Fayoum	Group 5 – Giza
KIMA Aswan	Qena (Qena)	Petrol Asyut	MS Maghagha (El Minya)	Al Seid
Wadi El Nile	Shouban Qena (Qena)	Al Badari	Al Wasta (Beni Suef)	Goldi
Al Hilal Aswan	Qeft (Qena)	Abo Teej	MS Bebba (Beni Suef)	MS Abo Al Namras
Al Gomhouria Club Draw	MS Al Minaa (Red Sea)	Manflot	MS Nasser Beni Suef (Beni Suef)	Al Ayat
Abo Al Reesh	El Maragha	Asyut Young Muslims	Abo Kassah	MS Al Saff
MS Edfu	Akhmim	Asyut Cement	Matar Tares	Genius
Luxor (Luxor)	El Maragha Young Muslims	Al Quseyya	MS Nasser Fayoum	El Sharqya Lel Dokhan
Al Madina Al Monawara (Luxor)	Mecca	Nasser El Fekreia (El Minya)	MS Tameia	MS Kerdasa
Al Salam Esna (Luxor)	Ahli Al Monshaa	Mallawi (El Minya)	MS Sanorres	6 October
Esna Young Muslims (Luxor)	Gerga	MS Smalut (El Minya)	MS Ibsheway	Ahli Bank
MS Al Rdwanya (Luxor)	MS El Belina	Beni Mazar (El Minya)	MS Etssa	Maadi Sports and Yacht Club (Cairo)
Quos (Qena)	MS Naga Mazen	MS Al Qess (El Minya)	Ghareb Employees (Red Sea)	Planes (Cairo)
		MS El Khargah (New Valley)		General Helwan (Cairo)

Group 6 – Cairo	Group 7 – Ismailia	Group 8 – Gharbia	Group 9 – North Sinai	Group 10 – Port Said
Ittihad El Shorta	Kahrabaa Ismailia	Benha (Qalyubia)	Nejmet Sinai	Port Fouad
Telecom Egypt	Baladeyet Ismailia	Shabab Tokh (Qalyubia)	Nasr El Arish	Al Rebat & Al Anwar
El Sekka El Hadid	Manshiyat El Shohada	MS Batta (Qalyubia)	MS Rabea	Al Fanar
El Marg	West Qantara	Sirs Al Layyanah (Monufia)	MS EL Kherba	Ghazl Damietta (Damietta)
Almaza	MS Abo Suweir	Arab Al Raml (Monufia)	Ittihad North Sinai	MS Faraskur (Damietta)
Egypt Petrol	MS Abo Shehata	Meet Khakan (Monufia)	6 October Arish	MS Mit El Khouly (Damietta)
El Ghaba	Ghazl Suez (Suez)	Ghazel Shebin Al Kom (Monufia)		Sherbeen (Dakahlia)
Misr Insurance	El Nobba (Suez)	Nogoom Saddat (Monufia)		El Matareya (Dakahlia)
Essco	South Sinai (South Sinai)	Maleyat Kafr El Zayat		Ittihad Al Manzalah (Dakahlia)
Al Qawmy	El Sharkia (Sharqia)	Othmanon		Belkas (Dakahlia)
Manshiyat Nasser	Faqous (Sharqia)	MS Zefta		Beni Ebeid (Dakahlia)
El Obour (Qalyubia)	Bilbeis (Sharqia)	Sporting Castle		Dekrnes (Dakahlia)
El Belastik (Qalyubia)	MS Abo Hammad (Sharqia)	Samanoud		Dakahlia Water (Dakahlia)
Bahttim (Qalyubia)		Seid Al Mahala		

Group 11 – Dakahlia	Group 12 – Kafr El Sheikh	Group 13 – Alexandria	Group 14 – Matrouh
Ittihad Nabarouh	El Hamool	Alexandria Sporting Club	El Tregi
Ettihad El Snblawen	Biyala	El Terram	Shabab El Dabaa
Shoban Bedwai	Baltim	Alexandria Petroleum	El Horreya
Kahraba Talkha	El Zafaran	Nahdet El Amereya	Matrouh
Shiko	Sakha	Montaza	MS El Hammam
Mansoura Employees	Metoubes	MS Obour	Al Masry Matrouh
Mega Sport	Basyoun	MS El Qabary	Al Shorta
El Snblawen	MS Qallin	MS Maamoura	Hilal El Dabaa
MS El Snblawen	MS El Hanafy	Badr (Beheira)	
MS Al Amir	Ittihad Basyoun (Gharbia)	Rasheed (Beheira)	
MS Samanoud	MS Kom Hamada (Beheira)	Ghazl Kafr El Dawwar (Beheira)	
Abo Kbeer (Sharqia)	MS Kafr Bulin (Beheira)	Beheira Water (Beheira)	
MS Nejm (Sharqia)	MS Itay Al Baroud (Beheira)	MS Rasheed (Beheira)	
	MS Hosh Issa (Beheira)		
