= Tahta SC =

Association football club in Egypt

- Full name: Tahta Sporting Club نادي طهطا للألعاب الرياضية
- Short name: THT
- Founded: 1932; 94 years ago
- Ground: Tahta Stadium
- Manager: Ayman Seddik
- League: Egyptian Third Division
Home colours	Away colours

Tahta Sporting Club (Arabic: نادي طهطا للألعاب الرياضية) is an Egyptian football club based in Tahta. The club is currently competing in Egyptian Third Division, the third-highest league in the Egyptian football league system.
