= Ala'ab Damanhour SC =

Egyptian football club

Ala'ab Damanhour
- Full name: Ala'ab Damanhour Sporting Club
- Short name: DSC
- Founded: 1961; 64 years ago
- Ground: Ala'ab Damanhour Stadium
- Capacity: 8,000
- League: Egyptian Third Division

Ala'ab Damanhour Sporting Club (Arabic: نادي الألعاب الرياضية بدمنهور) is an Egyptian football club based in Damanhour. The club is currently playing in the Egyptian Third Division, the third-highest league in the Egyptian football league system.

== History ==
Ala'ab Damanhour participated for only five seasons in the Egyptian Premier League, most recently in 2014–15.

Gedo played for the team in 2002.
