= Damietta SC =

Egyptian football club

- Full name: Damietta Sporting Club نادي دمياط الرياضي
- Short name: DSC
- Founded: 1923; 103 years ago
- Ground: Damietta Stadium
- Chairman: Mohamed Abou Ganba
- League: Egyptian Third Division

Damietta Sporting Club (Arabic: نادي دمياط الرياضي), is an Egyptian football club based in Damietta, Egypt. The club is currently playing in the Egyptian Third Division, the fourth-highest league in the Egyptian football league system.
