= Al Jazeera SC =

Egyptian sports club

- Full name: Al Jazeera Sports Club
- Short name: JAZ
- Founded: 2008; 17 years ago
- League: Egyptian Third Division

Al Jazeera Sports Club (Arabic: نادي الجزيرة الرياضي), is an Egyptian sports club based in Mersa Matruh, Egypt. The club is mainly known for its football team, which currently plays in the Egyptian Third Division, the third-highest league in the Egyptian football league system.
