= Al Walideya SC =

Egyptian football club

Al Walideya
- League: Egyptian third Division

Al Walideya is an Egyptian football club based in Asyut, Egypt. They are currently playing in Egyptian Third Division.
