= Beni Suef Stadium =

Sports venue in Egypt

Coordinates: 29°03′42″N 31°05′51″E

- Interactive map of Beni Suef Stadium
- Location: Bani Sweif, Egypt
- Capacity: 10,000
- Surface: Grass

Tenant
- Telephonat Bani Sweif

The Beni Suef Stadium (official name) is a multi-purpose stadium located in Bani Sweif, Egypt. It is used mostly for football and serves as the home stadium of Telephonat Bani Sweif. The stadium has a capacity of 10,000 people.
