= Gerga =

Town of ancient Caria

Coordinates: 37°31′07″N 28°08′49″E

Gerga (Ancient Greek: Γεργα) or Gergas (Γεργας), also possibly called Leukai Stelai was a town of ancient Caria.

Its site is located near Ovacık in Asiatic Turkey.
