= Aluminium Stadium =

ِAluminium Stadium
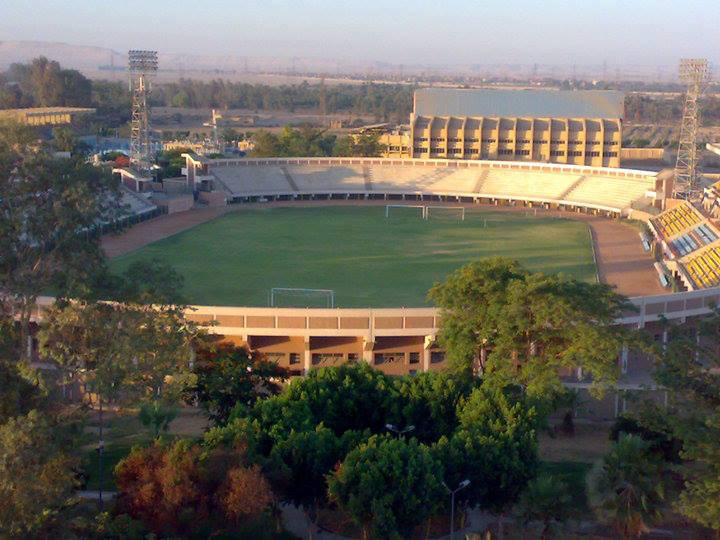
- Interactive map of ِAluminium Stadium
- Location: Nag Hammadi
- Coordinates: 26.007901°N 32.316623°E
- Capacity: 16,000
- Surface: Grass

Tenant
- Aluminium Nag Hammâdi

Aluminium Stadium (Arabic: استاد الألومينيوم), is located in Nag Hammadi (Arabic: نجع حمادى), a city in Upper Egypt. It is the home ground for Aluminium Nag Hammâdi, a football club competing in Egyptian Second Division.
