= El Mansoura Stadium =

Building in Egypt

Coordinates: 31°2′15″N 31°21′26″E

El-Mansoura Stadium (Arabic: ملعب المنصورة) is a multi-use sports stadium in Mansoura in Dakahlia Governorate, Egypt. It first opened in 1962. It has several facilities, including the main football stadium which hosts the home games of El Mansoura SC and has a capacity of 18,000. The stadium also has a hall for gymnastics; basketball, handball, and volleyball courts; an international tennis court; and pools for swimming and diving. A renovation project underway in 2026 has focused on development of the pitch and the athletics track, as well as the youth and sports hotel attached to the stadium, which will enable the El-Mansoura Stadium to receive international delegations.
