= Sohag SC =

Egyptian football club

- Full name: Sohag Sporting Club نادي سوهاج للألعاب الرياضية
- Short name: SOH
- Founded: 1931; 95 years ago
- Ground: Sohag Stadium
- Capacity: 20,000
- Manager: Hisham Abdel Meneam
- League: Egyptian Third Division
- 2015–16: Second Division, 7th (Group A)
Home colours	Away colours

Sohag Sporting Club (Arabic: نادي سوهاج للألعاب الرياضية) is an Egyptian football club based in Sohag, Egypt. The club is currently playing in the Egyptian Third Division, the third-highest league in the Egyptian football league system.
