= Sohag Stadium =

Coordinates: 26°33′28″N 31°42′33″E

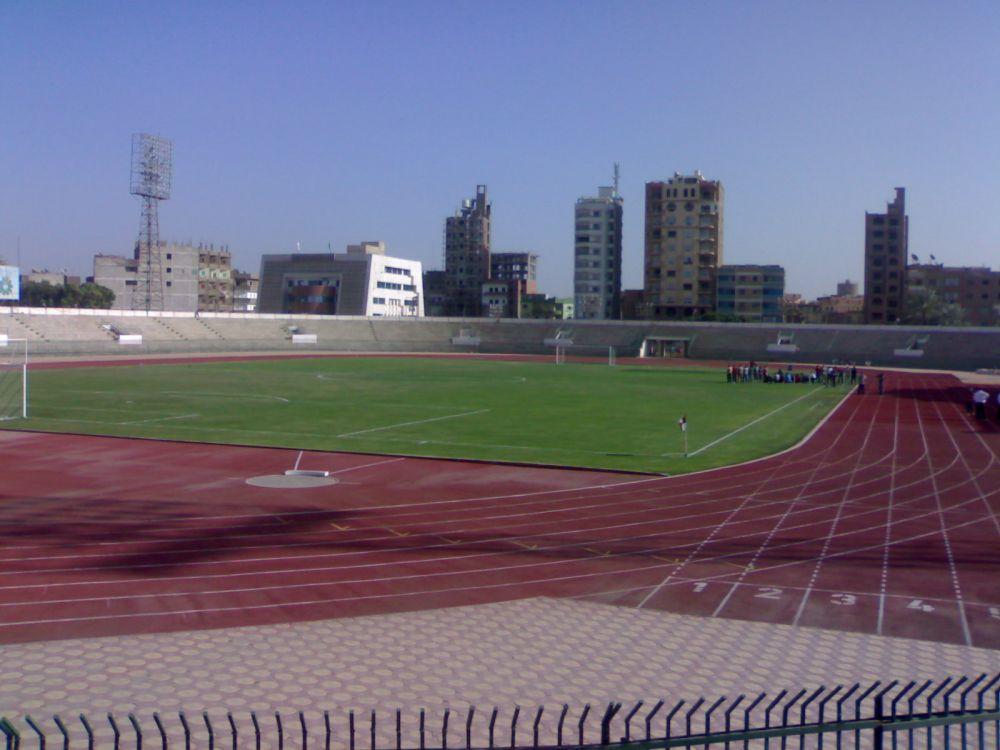
- Interactive map of Sohag Stadium
- Location: Sohag, Sohag Governorate, Egypt
- Capacity: 20,000
- Surface: Grass

Construction
- Built: 1930

Tenant
- Sohag FC

Sohag Stadium is located in the city centre of Sohag, its capacity is 20,000.
