= El Mansoura SC =

Association football club in Mansoura, Egypt

El-Mansoura SC
- Full name: El-Mansoura Sporting Club
- Short name: MAN
- Founded: 1932; 94 years ago
- Ground: El Mansoura Stadium
- Chairman: Mohamed Bassiouni
- Manager: Reda El Essawy
- League: Egyptian Second Division B
- 2022–23: Second Division, 8th (Group C) (relegated)
Home colours	Away colours

El-Mansoura Sporting Club (Arabic: نادي المنصورة الرياضي), is an Egyptian football club based in El Mansoura, Egypt. The club currently plays in the Egyptian Second Division B, the third-highest league in the Egyptian football league system.

The club was founded in 1932 as El Nady El Malaky Sporting Club (Arabic: النادي الملكي للألعاب الرياضية), and the membership was limited to the Civil servants only from the "Six Degree". The club's headquarters was the Mansoura Faculty of Medicine now, this lasted until the club moved to its current headquarters in 1949, the club name was also changed to El Baladeya Sporting Club (Arabic: النادي البلدية للألعاب الرياضية) in the same year; however, in 1971 the club name was changed again to its current name.

== Current squad ==
Note: Flags indicate national team as defined under FIFA eligibility rules; some limited exceptions apply. Players may hold more than one non-FIFA nationality.

No.	Pos.	Nation	Player
3	DF	EGY	Abdelaziz Hassan
4	DF	EGY	Saad Mohsen
5	DF	EGY	Hossam El-Garhy
7	MF	EGY	Ahmed El Saay
9	FW	EGY	Mohamed Fadl
10	FW	EGY	Wali Mowafi
13	DF	EGY	Ahmed Abdul-Hakam
14	MF	EGY	Mohamed Elsadat
17	DF	EGY	Reda Elsherbeny
20	MF	EGY	Ibrahim Marzouk
22	MF	EGY	Aly Eid

No.	Pos.	Nation	Player
25	MF	EGY	Sameh Nagah
30	FW	EGY	Ali Diab
-	DF	EGY	Ayman Aboul-Azayem
-	DF	EGY	Mohamed Abou-Mahdi
44	DF	EGY	Mostafa Mosaad
-	MF	EGY	Al-Sayed Ali
-	MF	EGY	Ahmed Anwar Salem
-	MF	EGY	Hamada Elwan
-	FW	EGY	Ahmed Hassan
-	FW	EGY	Adawy Akef

== Performance in CAF competitions ==
- FR = First round
- SR = Second round
- QF = Quarter-final
- SF = Semi-final

Season	Competition	Round	Country	Club	Home	Away	Aggregate
1997	African Cup Winners' Cup	FR	Sudan	Al Merrikh	2–0	1–0	3–0
1997	African Cup Winners' Cup	SR	Nigeria	Julius Berger	2–0	0–0	2–0
1997	African Cup Winners' Cup	QF	South Africa	Jomo Cosmos	3–0	2–2	5–2
1997	African Cup Winners' Cup	SF	Tunisia	Étoile du Sahel	4–2	0–3	4–5

== See also ==
- Egyptian Soccer League
- Egyptian Soccer Cup
- Egyptian Super Cup
