= Beni Suef SC =

Association football club in Beni Suef, Egypt

- Full name: Beni Suef Sporting Club
- Short name: BSU
- Founded: 1928
- Ground: Beni Suef Club Stadium
- Chairman: Ali Selim
- Manager: Hassan Moussa
- League: Egyptian Third Division
- Website: http://bns-club.com/
Home colours	Away colours

Beni Suef Sporting Club (Arabic: نادي بني سويف الرياضي), is an Egyptian football club based in Beni Suef, Egypt. The club currently plays in the Egyptian Third Division, the third-highest league in the Egyptian football league system.
