= KIMA Aswan SC =

Egyptian football club

- Full name: KIMA Aswan Sporting Club نادي كيما أسوان للألعاب الرياضية
- Ground: KIMA Aswan Stadium
- Capacity: 1,000
- Manager: Essam Abdel Gaber
- League: Egyptian Second Division
- 2015–16: Third Division, 1st (Group A) (Promoted)

KIMA Aswan Sporting Club (Arabic: نادي كيما أسوان للألعاب الرياضية), is an Egyptian football club based in Aswan, Egypt. The club currently plays in the Egyptian Second Division, the second-highest league in the Egyptian football league system.
