= Maleyat Kafr El Zayat SC =

Egyptian football club

Maleyat Kafr El Zayat
- Full name: Maleyat Kafr El Zayat
- Founded: 1948
- League: Egyptian Second Division

Maleyat Kafr El Zayat is an Egyptian football club based in Kafr El Zayat, Egypt. In the 2009/10 season, the club competed in the Egyptian Second Division.

Maleyat Kafr El Zayat played in the Egyptian Premier League for three seasons; 1957/58, 1962/63 and 1963/64.
