= Pharco FC =

Association football club in Alexandria, Egypt

- Full name: Pharco Football Club نادي فاركو لكرة القدم
- Short name: PHA
- Founded: 2010; 16 years ago
- Ground: Haras El Hodoud Stadium
- Capacity: 22,000
- Chairman: Ezzeldin Yashar Helmy
- Manager: Tarek El Ashri
- League: Egyptian Premier League
- 2024–25: 7th
- Website: pharcofootballclub.com

Pharco Football Club (Arabic: نادي فاركو لكرة القدم) is an Egyptian football club based in Alexandria. The club is related to the pharmaceutical company, Pharco Corporation, which was founded in 1983.

== History ==
The club used to play in the Egyptian Second Division starting from the 2014–15 season, the second-highest league in the Egyptian football league system. However, Pharco were promoted to the 2021–22 Egyptian Premier League for the first time in their history, as they finished top of their group in the 2020–21 Egyptian Second Division.

== Current squad ==
As of 8 April, 2026

Note: Flags indicate national team as defined under FIFA eligibility rules; some limited exceptions apply. Players may hold more than one non-FIFA nationality.

No.	Pos.	Nation	Player
1	GK	EGY	Fares El Sayed
2	DF	EGY	Ahmed Refai
4	MF	EGY	Mohamed Fakhri
5	MF	EGY	Abdelrahman Ashri
6	DF	EGY	Gaber Kamel
7	FW	EGY	Karim El Tayeb
8	MF	EGY	Hussein Hosny
9	FW	EGY	Mahmoud Farhat
11	MF	EGY	Walid Mostafa
13	MF	EGY	Yassin El Mallah
14	MF	EGY	Mazen Adel
15	MF	EGY	Mostafa Tarek
16	GK	EGY	Mohamed Nadim
17	DF	EGY	Mohamed Gaber
18	DF	EGY	Camacho
19	MF	EGY	Mahmoud Emad
20	MF	EGY	Halimo

No.	Pos.	Nation	Player
21	DF	TUN	Azmi Ghouma
23	FW	EGY	Walid Mostafa
24	MF	EGY	Ahmed El Bahrawi
25	GK	EGY	Mohamed Shika
27	DF	EGY	Seif Emam
28	MF	ANG	Enoque
31	DF	EGY	Moaz Ahmed
33	DF	SEN	Babacar Ndiaye
34	GK	EGY	Abdelrahman Nafad
39	MF	EGY	Youssef Galal
44	DF	EGY	Abdelrahman Rashdan
52	GK	EGY	Ahmed Daador
70	FW	EGY	Salah Basha
77	FW	EGY	Ramez Medhat
90	FW	EGY	Shawky El Danin
99	FW	EGY	Ali Yasser
