= Al Hammam SC =

Egyptian football club

- Full name: Al Hammam Sporting Club نادي الحمام الرياضي
- Short name: HAM
- Founded: 1962; 63 years ago
- Ground: MS Al Hammam Stadium
- Chairman: Nour Raslan
- Manager: Samir Saad
- League: Egyptian Second Division
- 2019–20: Second Division Group C, 8th
Home colours	Away colours

Al Hammam Sporting Club (Arabic: نادي الحمام الرياضي), is an Egyptian football club based in Al Hammam, Mersa Matruh, Egypt. The club currently plays in the Egyptian Second Division, the second-highest tier of the Egyptian football league system. The club has just signed a Nigerian player Wale Akintola
