= Porto Suez SC =

Egyptian sports club

- Full name: Porto Suez Sporting Club نادي بورتو السويس الرياضي
- Short name: POR
- Ground: Porto Stadium
- Manager: Reda El Fedawy
- League: Egyptian Second Division
- 2017–18: Third Division, 1st (Group E)

Porto Suez Sporting Club (Arabic: نادي بورتو السويس الرياضي), also known as Porto El Sokhna SC, is an Egyptian sports club based in Ain Sokhna, Suez, Egypt. The club is mainly known for its football team, which currently plays in the Egyptian Second Division, the second-highest tier of the Egyptian football league system.
