= Gomhoriat Shebin SC =

Egyptian sports club

- Full name: Gomhoriat Shebin Sporting Club
- Short name: GOM
- Founded: 1932; 94 years ago
- Ground: Gomhoriat Shebin Stadium
- Manager: Mohamed El Rashedy
- League: Egyptian Second Division
- 2018–19: Second Division, 7th (Group B)
Home colours	Away colours

Gomhoriat Shebin Sporting Club (Arabic: نادي جمهورية شبين الرياضي), is an Egyptian sports club based in Shebin El Koum, El Monufia, Egypt. The club is mainly known for its football team, which currently plays in the Egyptian Second Division, the second-highest tier of the Egyptian football league system.

== Notable players ==
- (Sierra Leone) Amidu Karim (1994–1997)
- (Egypt) Mostafa Ziko (2016–2019)
