= Dayrout SC =

Egyptian football club

- Full name: Dayrout Sporting Club نادي ديروط للألعاب الرياضية
- Short name: DAY
- Founded: 1972; 53 years ago
- Ground: MS Abnub Stadium
- Manager: Emad Samir
- League: Egyptian Second Division
- 2015–16: Second Division, 6th (Group B)
Home colours	Third colours

Dayrout Sporting Club (Arabic: نادي ديروط للألعاب الرياضية), is an Egyptian football club based in Dayrout, Asyut, Egypt. The club currently plays in the Egyptian Second Division, the second-highest tier in the Egyptian football league system.
