= Kafr El Sheikh SC =

Association football club in Kafr El Sheikh, Egypt

Kafr El Sheikh
- Full name: Kafr El Sheikh Sporting Club
- Nickname(s): Capital City Team
- Short name: KFS SC
- Ground: Kafr El Sheikh Stadium
- Capacity: 20,000
- Chairman: Ashraf Abou Halima
- Manager: Abdel Naser Mohamed
- League: Egyptian Second Division
- 2015–16: Second Division, 7th (Group F)
Home colours	Away colours

Kafr El Sheikh Sporting Club (Arabic: نادي كفر الشيخ للألعاب الرياضية), is an Egyptian football club based in Kafr El Sheikh, Egypt. The club plays in the Egyptian Second Division, the second-highest league in the Egyptian football league system.
