= Egyptian football league system =

Football league

The Egyptian football league system refers to the hierarchically interconnected league system (league pyramid) for association football in Egypt. All divisions are bound together by the principle of promotion and relegation. The system consists of five levels, with the top two levels being professional league. Below this, the semi-professional and amateur levels that have progressively more parallel divisions, which each cover progressively smaller geographic areas. Teams that finish at the top of their division at the end of each season can rise higher in the pyramid, while those that finish at the bottom find themselves sinking further down. In theory, it is possible for even the lowest local amateur club to rise to the top of the system and become Egyptian football champions one day. The number of teams promoted and relegated between the divisions varies, and can change from a season and another.

== Structure ==
The Egyptian football league system is held under the jurisdiction of the nationwide Egyptian Football Association, along with its regional associations around the country.

On top of the system sit the level one Egyptian Premier League, the first professional football league in the country. It's followed by level two Egyptian Second Division A, the second professional league. Level three, Egyptian Second Division B, is the top semi-professional league in the country, which is expected to consist of four groups, and is followed on the pyramid by level four, the Egyptian Third Division, is the second-highest semi-professional league in the system. The number of teams and groups in the league change every season due to various reasons. The lowest football league system in Egypt is level five Egyptian Fourth Division, the only amateur league in the system. The number of teams and groups in the league also change every season due to various reasons.

The structure of the football league system in Egypt was changed ahead of the start of the 2023–24 season. The old Egyptian Second Division, which was a semi-professional league, was abolished and replaced with the Second Division A and Second Division B, a new professional and semi-professional leagues, respectively.

Level	Division			
1	Egyptian Premier League; 18 teams ↓ 3 relegation spots			
2	Egyptian Second Division A 20 teams ↑ 3 promotion spots ↓ 4 relegation spots			
3	Egyptian Second Division B 56 teams ↑ 4 promotion spots ↓ 12 relegation spots			
3	Group A (Upper Egypt); 14 teams ↑ 1 promotion spot ↓ 3 relegation spots	Group B (Cairo and neighboring cities); 14 teams ↑ 1 promotion spot ↓ 3 relegation spots	Group C (Northern Egypt); 14 teams ↑ 1 promotion spot ↓ 3 relegation spots	Group D (North-eastern governorates); 14 teams ↑ 1 promotion spot ↓ 3 relegation spots
