= 2019–20 Egypt Cup qualifying rounds =

Tournament details
- Country: Egypt

The 2019–20 Egypt Cup qualifying rounds open the 88th season of the competition in Egypt, the oldest association football single knockout competition in Africa.

== Calendar ==
The calendar for the 2019–20 Egypt Cup qualifying rounds, as announced by the Egyptian Football Association.

Round	Date	Number of Fixtures	Clubs Remaining	New Entries This Round
First Preliminary Round	15–17 October 2019	104	262 → 151	209; teams playing in the Egyptian Third Division and the Egyptian Fourth Division
Second Preliminary Round	19–20 October 2019	47	151 → 104	none
Third Preliminary Round	25–28 October 2019	43	104 → 61	35; teams playing in the Egyptian Second Division
Fourth Preliminary Round	13–16 November 2019	15	61 → 46	none
Fifth Preliminary Round	20–23 November 2019	14	46 → 32	none

== First Preliminary Round ==
The First Preliminary Round fixtures were played from 15 to 17 October 2019. A total of 205 teams from the Egyptian Third Division and the Egyptian Fourth Division entered at this stage of the competition. Like the previous season, a large number of clubs did not enter the competition due to financial status and other different reasons. The results were as follows:

Tie	Home Team	Score	Away Team
15 October 2019
1	Gomhoriat Drau	1–0	Al Hilal (Aswan)
2	KIMA Aswan	4–1	MS Edfu
3	Luxor	6–1	MS El Radwaniya
4	Al Madina Al Monawara	2–1	MS Al Salam Esna
5	Qeft	5–1	Workers (Qena)
6	Qena	2–1	Qous
7	Workers (Ras Gharib)	2–0	Ras Gharib
8	Al Ahly (El Monshah)	0–0 (4–3 p)	El Taleyhat
10	MS Sohag	2–0	Sohag Touring
11	MS Al Baleyna	1–0	Mecca El Mokarama
12	Shoban Al Maragha	1–0	Akhmim
13	Abou Tig	1–1 (5–4 p)	Muslim Youths (Asyut)
14	Asyut Cement	1–0	Al Badari
15	El Hindau	0–1	Muslim Youths (El Kharga)
16	MS El Kharga	0–0 (4–5 p)	El Qouseiya
17	MS Nasser Malawy	0–1	MS El Adwa
19	Nasser El Fekreia	1–1 (5–4 p)	Beni Mazar
20	MS El Qais	1–2	MS Nogoa Mazin
21	MS Nasser Beni Suef	Cancelled (Note: Fixture was cancelled after both teams withdrew.)	MS Beba
22	Al Wasta	1–0	MS Samasta
23	Matar Taris	2–2 (3–2 p)	MS Nasser Faiyum
24	MS Snouras	w/o (Note: MS Snouras won on walkover after MS Faiyum withdrew.)	MS Faiyum
25	MS Atsa	Cancelled	MS Abou Kasah
26	MS Ebshway	Cancelled	MS Tamya
27	Helwan El A'am	4–0	MS Abou El Saoud
28	El Sekka El Hadid	1–1 (5–4 p)	MS El Zaher
29	Al Ghaba	1–0	Toshka
30	Egypt Insurance	1–2	Esco
31	Al Marag	5–2	Planes Factory
32	HCHD	3–0	Gezira
33	El Shams	1–2	Helioplis
34	El Qawmi	3–0	ETE
35	Telecom Egypt	1–1 (7–6 p)	MS Al Amiriya
36	Al Masry (Cairo)	0–3	Al Maady & Al Yacht
37	MS Al Badrashen	0–0 (3–1 p)	Olympic Champion
38	Guinness	4–1	MS Imbaba
39	MS Al Saf	0–3	Kaskada
40	6 October (Giza)	4–2	MS Warraq El Arab
41	Eastern Company	3–0	El Said (Giza)
42	MS Abou El Nemris	1–0	Goldi
43	Plastic Shubra El Kheima	2–0	Workers' Institution
44	Bahtim	3–0	Shebin El Qanater
45	MS Bata	0–1	MS Toukh
46	Al Obour (El Qalyubia)	3–0	Banha
47	Osmathon Tanta	2–0	MS Zefta
49	Samanoud	0–1	El Said (El Mahalla)
50	Kafr El Sheikh	4–1	MS Sidi Ghazi
52	Baltim	1–0	MS Qelein
53	MS Matobis	1–0	Ittihad Bassioun
54	Al Hamoul	3–1	El Za'faran
55	MS El Shohada	1–1 (4–5 p)	Sidi Salem
56	Ghazl Shebin	3–0	Al Watani (Shebin El Koum)
57	Sers El Layan	1–2	MS Quesna
59	MS Tala	0–0 (6–5 p)	Mit Khakan
60	Sherbeen	3–0	MS El Kheyareyah
61	Workers (El Mansoura)	4–2	MS El Senbellawein
62	MS Bedway	3–0	Mit Ghamr
63	El Senbellawein	5–0	Dakados
64	MS Minyat Samanoud	1–1 (4–5 p)	DKWASC
65	MS Al Amir	2–1	Sheko
66	Ittihad Nabarouh	2–0	Mega Sport
67	Beni Ebeid	6–3	Ittihad El Manzalah
68	Kahraba Talkha	1–1 (5–4 p)	Belkas
70	Ras El Bar	7–1	Kafr Saad
71	MS Mit El Kholy Abdallah	2–1	Ghazl Damietta
72	MS Abou Hamad	2–1	Borussia Egypt
73	Faqous	1–1 (5–4 p)	MS Faqous
75	Abou Kebir	4–2	El Rowad
76	El Sharkia	1–0	Belbis
77	Port Fouad	0–0 (5–4 p)	Al Rebat & Al Anwar
78	Derb Najm	6–1	Ghazl Port Said
79	Manshiyat El Shohada	1–0	MS Tell El Kebir
80	Baladeyet Ismailia	3–1	Gharb El Qantara
81	Kahraba Ismailia	4–1	MS Abou Shehata
82	Porto Suez	8–0	El Tegara
83	Ghazl Suez	1–0	Suez Fertilizers
84	MS Abou Souyer	1–1 (4–5 p)	El Nobah
85	6 October (North Sinai)	2–0	MS Abou Zenima
88	Abou Sakal	0–2	MS El Kherba
89	Ghazl Kafr El Dawar	1–2	MS Abou El Matamer
90	MS Koum Hamada	Cancelled	Badr
91	BWADC	Cancelled	Rasheed
92	MS Housh Eissa	Cancelled	Koum Hamada
93	MS Kafr Bouleyn	Cancelled	MS Eitay El Baroud
94	MS El Qabari	2–0	Tala'ea El Ostoul
97	MS El Mamurah	2–0	Horse Owners
98	Alexandria Petroleum	2–0	Nogoom El Metras
99	Sporting Alexandria	4–1	Shabab El Nile
101	Nahdat El Amreya	2–0	MS Al Nasr
102	MS Al Hammam	2–1	El Qasmi
104	Al Hilal (El Daba'a)	1–1 (3–4 p)	Al Jazeera
16 October 2019
9	Al Maragha	1–0	Girga
18	Malawy	1–0	MS Maghagha
48	Sporting Castle	2–1	MS Mahallat Hassan
51	MS El Hanafy	1–0	Sakha
58	Arab El Raml	2–1	Mit Khalf
69	El Matarya	2–1	MS El Rawda
74	MS Derb Najm	w/o (Note: MS Derb Najm won on walkover after MS Abou Kebir withdrew.)	MS Abou Kebir
86	Sinai Star	3–0	MS Balouza
95	El Teram	1–1 (4–5 p)	El Magd
96	MS Al Obour	2–2 (5–4 p)	Delphi
100	MS Borg El Arab	2–0	MVP
103	Shabab El Daba'a	1–1 (4–5 p)	Al Masry (Al Saloum)
17 October 2019
87	Al Nasr (Arish)	1–1 (4–5 p)	MS Rabaa

The following team received a bye for this round:

- El Horreya

== Second Preliminary Round ==
The Second Preliminary Round fixtures were played on 19 and 20 October 2019. The results were as follows:

Tie	Home Team	Score	Away Team
19 October 2019
1	Gomhoriat Drau	0–3	KIMA Aswan
2	Luxor	0–2	Al Madina Al Monawara
3	Qeft	0–0 (3–4 p)	Qena
4	Workers (Ras Gharib)	1–1 (5–4 p)	Al Ahly (El Monshah)
6	MS Al Baleyna	1–2	Shoban Al Maragha
7	Abou Tig	0–0 (3–5 p)	Asyut Cement
8	Muslim Youths (El Kharga)	w/o (Note: The match was suspended in the second half after Muslim Youths (El Kharga) players and staff attacked the match officials in protest of refereeing. As a result, they were disqualified from the competition by the EFA, and El Qouseiya won on walkover.)	El Qouseiya
10	Nasser El Fekreia	1–0	MS Nogoa Mazin
11	Matar Taris	0–0 (4–5 p)	MS Snouras
12	Helwan El A'am	1–3	El Sekka El Hadid
13	Al Ghaba	0–1	Esco
14	Al Marag	1–2	HCHD
15	Helioplis	1–1 (4–5 p)	El Qawmi
16	Telecom Egypt	0–0 (7–8 p)	Al Maady & Al Yacht
17	MS Al Badrashen	0–1	Guinness
18	Kaskada	0–0 (2–3 p)	6 October (Giza)
19	Eastern Company	2–0	MS Abou El Nemris
20	Plastic Shubra El Kheima	0–0 (4–5 p)	Bahtim
21	MS Toukh	1–1 (3–4 p)	Al Obour (El Qalyubia)
22	Osmathon Tanta	1–0	Sporting Castle
23	El Said (El Mahalla)	0–0 (1–4 p)	Kafr El Sheikh
25	MS Matobis	0–3	Al Hamoul
26	Sidi Salem	0–1	Ghazl Shebin
28	MS Tala	1–1 (4–5 p)	Sherbeen
29	Workers (El Mansoura)	2–1	MS Bedway
30	El Senbellawein	2–2 (4–3 p)	DKWASC
31	MS Al Amir	0–2	Ittihad Nabarouh
32	Beni Ebeid	2–1	Kahraba Talkha
33	El Matarya	1–0	Ras El Bar
34	MS Mit El Kholy Abdallah	0–0 (3–2 p)	MS Abou Hamad
36	Abou Kebir	0–1	El Sharkia
37	Port Fouad	1–0	Derb Najm
38	Manshiyat El Shohada	1–1 (4–3 p)	Baladeyet Ismailia
39	Kahraba Ismailia	1–1 (4–5 p)	Porto Suez
40	Ghazl Suez	1–3	El Nobah
43	El Magd	0–3	MS Al Obour
44	MS El Mamurah	2–0	Alexandria Petroleum
45	Sporting Alexandria	6–1	MS Borg El Arab
46	Nahdat El Amreya	1–1 (4–3 p)	MS Al Hammam
20 October 2019
5	Al Maragha	1–0	MS Sohag
9	MS El Adwa	2–0	Malawy
24	MS El Hanafy	2–4	Baltim
27	MS Quesna	0–0 (4–5 p)	Arab El Raml
35	Faqous	2–2 (5–6 p)	MS Derb Najm
41	6 October (North Sinai)	0–1	Sinai Star
42	MS Rabaa	0–2	MS El Kherba
47	Al Masry (Al Saloum)	1–1 (4–5 p)	El Horreya

The following teams received a bye for this round:

- MS Abou El Matamer
- MS El Qabari
- Al Jazeera
- Al Wasta

== Third Preliminary Round ==
The Third Preliminary Round fixtures were played from 25 to 28 October 2019. A total of 35 teams from the Egyptian Second Division entered at this stage of the competition. Muslim Youths (Qena) was the only team from the Second Division that did not enter the competition. The results were as follows:

Tie	Home Team	Score	Away Team
25 October 2019
1	Media	0–0 (5–4 p)	Dayrout
4	Asyut Cement	0–1	Telephonat Beni Suef
5	Sohag	1–1 (1–2 p)	Beni Suef
6	El Minya	2–0	Asyut Petroleum
8	Petrojet	2–1	Bahtim
15	Tersana	4–2	6 October (Giza)
16	Al Merreikh	2–1	El Dakhleya
17	Coca-Cola	0–1	Al Zarka
18	Al Nasr	4–0	Gomhoriat Shebin
19	MS Abou El Matamer	1–3	Dikernis
21	Baladeyet El Mahalla	3–1	MS Derb Najm
28	Maleyat Kafr El Zayat	1–4	Pharco
35	Nogoom	1–1 (6–5 p)	Ceramica Cleopatra
37	HCHD	0–1	Suez
26 October 2019
2	Tahta	3–0	Nasser El Fekreia
7	Al Madina Al Monawara	1–1 (3–4 p)	Faiyum
9	Eastern Company	4–1	Sinai Star
10	Porto Suez	2–2 (4–5 p)	Al Obour (El Qalyubia)
11	National Bank of Egypt	2–0	Guinness
12	Al Maady & Al Yacht	1–0	MS El Kherba
13	El Qanah	0–0 (4–3 p)	El Sekka El Hadid
31	Workers (Ras Gharib)	0–0 (4–5 p)	Qena
32	MS El Adwa	1–1 (4–5 p)	El Qouseiya
33	Al Aluminium	3–0	Shoban Al Maragha
34	Al Maragha	1–4	MS Snouras
36	Esco	0–3	El Qawmi
28 October 2019
3	KIMA Aswan	0–0 (3–5 p)	Al Wasta
14	Port Fouad	0–0 (4–1 p)	Manshiyat El Shohada
20	Nahdat El Amreya	1–0	MS El Qabari
22	Arab El Raml	2–1	El Matarya
23	Workers (El Mansoura)	1–3	El Senbellawein
24	Ala'ab Damanhour	2–2 (7–8 p)	MS Mit El Kholy Abdallah
25	MS Al Obour	1–2	El Mansoura
26	Ittihad Nabarouh	2–0	Al Hamoul
27	Ghazl El Mahalla	1–1 (1–4 p)	Kafr El Sheikh
29	Osmathon Tanta	1–1 (3–4 p)	Al Hammam
30	Ghazl Shebin	1–0	MS El Mamurah
38	El Sharkia	4–1	El Nobah
39	Sporting Alexandria	2–0	Beni Ebeid
40	El Raja	0–0 (1–2 p)	Olympic Club
41	Abou Qir Fertilizers	2–0	Sherbeen
42	Biyala	1–0	Baltim
43	Al Jazeera	1–0	El Horreya

== Fourth Preliminary Round ==
The Fourth Preliminary Round fixtures were played from 13 to 16 November 2019. The results were as follows:

Tie	Home Team	Score	Away Team
13 November 2019
5	Eastern Company	2–2 (3–4 p)	Al Obour (El Qalyubia)
12	El Senbellawein	4–2	MS Mit El Kholy Abdallah
14 November 2019
1	Media	1–0	Tahta
2	Al Wasta	0–0 (2–4 p)	Telephonat Beni Suef
3	Beni Suef	4–0	El Minya
6	National Bank of Egypt	4–1	Al Maady & Al Yacht
15 November 2019
4	Faiyum	0–3	Petrojet
7	El Qanah	1–3	Port Fouad
8	Tersana	4–1	Al Merreikh
16 November 2019
9	Al Zarka	2–2 (3–4 p)	Al Nasr
10	Dikernis	3–0	Nahdat El Amreya
11	Baladeyet El Mahalla	1–1 (4–5 p)	Arab El Raml
13	El Mansoura	0–0 (3–1 p)	Ittihad Nabarouh
14	Kafr El Sheikh	0–1	Pharco
15	Al Hammam	3–1	Ghazl Shebin

The following teams received a bye for this round:

- Abou Qir Fertilizers
- Al Aluminium
- Biyala
- Al Jazeera
- MS Snouras
- Nogoom
- Olympic Club
- El Qawmi
- Qena
- El Qouseiya
- El Sharkia
- Sporting Alexandria
- Suez

== Fifth Preliminary Round ==
The Fifth Preliminary Round fixtures were played from 20 to 23 November 2019. The results were as follows:

Tie	Home Team	Score	Away Team
20 November 2019
1	Qena	1–0	El Qouseiya
4	Nogoom	5–2	Port Fouad
9	El Qawmi	0–1	Al Obour (El Qalyubia)
21 November 2019
7	Al Jazeera	0–0 (4–3 p)	El Senbellawein
10	Petrojet	4–0	Sporting Alexandria
22 November 2019
8	El Sharkia	0–0 (5–4 p)	Al Aluminium
11	Telephonat Beni Suef	1–1 (2–4 p)	Al Nasr
23 November 2019
2	Abou Qir Fertilizers	2–0	El Mansoura
3	Pharco	1–1 (5–4 p)	Suez
5	Media	2–0	National Bank of Egypt
6	Tersana	2–0	Olympic Club
12	Beni Suef	4–1	Arab El Raml
13	Dikernis	1–0	Al Hammam
14	Biyala	2–0	MS Snouras

== Competition proper ==
Winners from the Fifth Preliminary Round will advance to the Round of 32, where teams from the Egyptian Premier League will enter the competition.
