= 2018–19 Egypt Cup qualifying rounds =

Tournament details
- Country: Egypt

The 2018–19 Egypt Cup qualifying rounds open the 87th season of the competition in Egypt, the oldest association football single knockout competition in Africa.

== Calendar ==
The calendar for the 2018–19 Egypt Cup qualifying rounds, as announced by the Egyptian Football Association.

| Round | Date | Number of Fixtures | Clubs Remaining | New Entries This Round |
| First Preliminary Round | 12–18 August 2018 | 101 | 262 → 161 | 205; teams playing in the Egyptian Third Division and the Egyptian Fourth Division |
| Second Preliminary Round | 4–5 September 2018 | 31 | 161 → 130 | none |
| Third Preliminary Round | 24–26 September 2018 | 56 | 130 → 74 | 39; teams playing in the Egyptian Second Division |
| Fourth Preliminary Round | 29–30 September 2018 | 28 | 74 → 46 | none |
| Fifth Preliminary Round | 3 October 2018 | 14 | 46 → 32 | none |

== First Preliminary Round ==
First Preliminary Round fixtures were played from 12 to 18 August 2018. A total of 205 teams from the Egyptian Third Division and the Egyptian Fourth Division entered at this stage of the competition. A large number of clubs did not enter the competition due to financial status and other different reasons, including Al Fanar, a club that was playing in the Egyptian Second Division in the previous season. The results were as follows:

| Tie | Home Team | Score | Away Team |
12 August 2018
| 47 | Sporting Alexandria | 1–0 | Delphi |
| 55 | MS Abou El Matamer | 2–1 | MS El Qabari |
13 August 2018
| 53 | Nogoom El Metras | 1–3 | Shabab El Daba'a |
14 August 2018
| 21 | MS Snouras | 1–1 (5–4 p) | Maghagha |
| 24 | Beni Mazar | 2–1 | MS El Fashn |
| 25 | MS Naser Beni Suef | 1–1 (4–5 p) | Matar Taris |
| 26 | Al Masry (Cairo) | 1–0 | MS Al Badrashen |
| 27 | Al Obour (El Qalyubia) | 1–1 (3–4 p) | Plastic Shubra El Kheima |
| 28 | El Qanater El Khairiya | 2–0 | El Ayiat |
| 29 | MS Bashtel | 1–4 | Bahtim |
| 30 | Telecom Egypt | 1–1 (3–2 p) | El Sekka El Hadid |
| 31 | MS El Bragel | 0–3 | Kaskada |
| 32 | National Bank | 2–0 | Aviation Club |
| 33 | Banha | 3–0 | Esco |
| 35 | Shebin El Qanater | 0–1 | Egypt Insurance |
| 38 | Helioplis | 0–2 | Al Ghaba |
| 39 | 6th of October City | 1–1 (5–4 p) | Guinness |
| 40 | Al Marag | 1–1 (4–5 p) | Helwan El A'am |
| 41 | Eastern Company | 2–0 | HCHD |
| 42 | Workers' Institution | 1–3 | Al Maady & Al Yacht |
| 45 | MS Abou El Nemris | 1–1 (3–2 p) | MS Toukh |
| 48 | El Horreya | 4–2 | MS Al Ma'amoura |
| 52 | MS Al Hammam | 2–2 (2–3 p) | Al Hilal (El Daba'a) |
| 61 | MS El Hanafy | 0–1 | Sakha |
| 63 | Qelein | 1–4 | MS Koum Hamada |
| 75 | Kahraba Damietta | 0–1 | MS Minyat Samanoud |
| 76 | MS El Senbellawein | 1–1 (3–4 p) | Beni Ebeid |
| 77 | MS Al Amir | 9–1 | Kafr Saad |
| 78 | MS Abou Kebir | 0–0 (4–3 p) | El Matarya |
| 79 | Ras El Bar | 2–2 (7–8 p) | Workers (El Mansoura) |
| 82 | El Mostakbal (Damietta) | 0–4 | Abou Kebir |
| 83 | Belbis | 3–0 | MS New Damietta |
| 84 | Belkas | 0–1 | MS Bedway |
| 86 | Talkha | 1–0 | MS Derb Najm |
| 87 | Sheko | 3–2 | Sherbeen |
| 88 | DKWASC | 0–1 | Ittihad Nabarouh |
| 89 | Maa'sara El Dakahlia | 1–2 | Ghazl Damietta |
| 90 | Ittihad El Manzalah | 2–2 (6–7 p) | Mega Sport |
| 91 | MS Abou Hamad | 1–4 | Dikernis |
| 92 | MS El Rawda City | 1–2 | El Senbellawein |
15 August 2018
| 9 | Akhmim | 1–1 (4–5 p) | Abou Tig |
| 10 | MS Al Kharga | 1–2 | Assiut Petroleum |
| 11 | Al Badari | 3–3 (8–9 p) | Shoban Al Maragha |
| 12 | Al Maragha | 1–1 (6–5 p) | New Valley |
| 13 | MS Nogoa Mazin | 0–2 | Muslim Youths (Assiut) |
| 14 | Mecca El Mokarama | 2–1 | Manfalout |
| 15 | MS Al Baleyna | 2–1 | MS Sahel Selim |
| 17 | El Qouseiya | 2–2 (7–6 p) | Assiut Cement |
| 18 | Malawy | 1–1 (2–4 p) | MS Maghagha |
| 19 | MS Atsa | 4–0 | Al Wasta |
| 20 | MS Samalout | 1–2 | Naser El Fekreia |
| 34 | Ittihad El Shorta | 1–0 | Goldi |
| 36 | El Qawmi | 0–0 (6–5 p) | MS Al Saf |
| 43 | MS Kerdasa | 1–1 (5–3 p) | Manshiyat Naser |
| 44 | Planes Factory | 3–2 | MS New Helwan |
| 46 | El Teram | 1–2 | Al Masry (Al Saloum) |
| 49 | Al Zohour (Matrouh) | 2–3 | El Montazah |
| 50 | Alexandria Petroleum | 1–0 | Horse Owners |
| 51 | MS Al Obour (Alexandria) | 2–0 | Matrouh |
| 54 | Taraji El Daba'a | 2–2 (3–2 p) | Nahdat El A'amreiya |
| 56 | MS Housh Eissa | 3–0 | El Za'faran |
| 57 | BWADC | 0–0 (3–4 p) | MS Eitay El Baroud |
| 58 | MS Kafr Bouleyn | 1–1 (4–2 p) | Rasheed |
| 59 | Deskouk | 2–1 | Badr |
| 60 | Al Hamoul | 0–0 (8–7 p) | Al Zohour (El Noubariya) |
| 62 | Baltim | 1–0 | MS Rasheed |
| 64 | MS Qelein | 1–0 | Ghazl Kafr El Dawar |
| 65 | MS Matobis | 0–0 (5–3 p) | Bela |
| 66 | Ashmoun | 3–2 | MS Zefta |
| 67 | Samanoud | 3–1 | Al Watani (Shebin El Koum) |
| 68 | Ghazl Shebin | 0–2 | Osmathon Tanta |
| 69 | Sporting Castle | 1–0 | Maleyat Kafr El Zayat |
| 70 | Al Sonta | 1–4 | Sers El Layan |
| 71 | Qouesna | 0–4 | Al Said (El Mahalla) |
| 72 | Menouf | 3–1 | Al Watani (Berkat El Saba'a) |
| 73 | Arab El Raml | 1–0 | Ittihad Bassioun |
| 80 | MS El Qaniyat | 2–1 | Kahraba Talkha |
| 81 | Hahya | 1–9 | MS Mit El Khouly Abdullah |
| 85 | Faqous | 1–1 (4–1 p) | Ittihad El Senbellawein |
| 93 | El Nobah | 4–0 | Suez Fertilizers |
| 94 | Ghazl Suez | 4–1 | South Sinai |
| 95 | Port Fouad | 3–0 | Al Nasr (Arish) |
| 98 | MS Abou Shehata | 1–0 | MS Balouza |
| 99 | Gharb El Qantara | 3–0 | Manshiyat El Shohada |
| 100 | Al Rebat & Al Anwar | 2–0 | MS El Kherba |
| 101 | Baladeyet Ismailia | 1–0 | Ittihad North Sinai |
16 August 2018
| 22 | MS Tamya | 2–2 (5–4 p) | MS Beba |
| 37 | Al Said (Giza) | 2–1 | Olympic Champion |
| 74 | El Sharkia | 2–1 | MS Pharscore |
17 August 2018
| 5 | Workers (Ras Gharib) | 6–0 | October (Ras Gharib) |
| 23 | Abou Kasah | 2–2 (3–4 p) | MS Ebshway |
18 August 2018
| 1 | Al Hilal (Aswan) | 3–0 | Gomhoriat Drau |
| 2 | Al Salam (Esna) | 2–1 | Nile Valley |
| 3 | MS Al Hasaya & Al Hakroub | 1–1 (5–6 p) | MS Edfu |
| 4 | KIMA Aswan | 0–1 | Luxor |
| 6 | Workers (Farshout) | 3–2 | Qous |
| 7 | Qena | 2–2 (4–2 p) | Qeft |
| 8 | MS Dishna | 2–3 | Muslim Youths (Qena) |
| 16 | Girga | 1–1 (4–1 p) | Al Ahly (El Monshah) |
| 96 | Kahraba Ismailia | 3–1 | Sinai Star |
| 97 | MS Rabaa | 0–1 | 6 October (North Sinai) |

The following teams received a bye for this round:

- MS Abou Souyer
- MS Damietta
- MS El Qais

== Second Preliminary Round ==
Second Preliminary Round fixtures were played on 4 and 5 September 2018. The results were as follows:

| Tie | Home Team | Score | Away Team |
4 September 2018
| 1 | MS Ebshway | 1–0 | MS Snouras |
| 2 | Beni Mazar | 4–1 | MS Tamya |
| 3 | Abou Tig | 4–0 | Shoban Al Maragha |
| 4 | Girga | 1–0 | Mecca El Mokarama |
| 5 | MS Edfu | 1–1 (1–4 p) | Workers (Farshout) |
| 6 | Al Salam (Esna) | 0–0 (4–3 p) | Luxor |
| 7 | Workers (Ras Gharib) | 0–1 | Muslim Youths (Qena) |
| 8 | Port Fouad | 2–0 | Kahraba Ismailia |
| 9 | MS Abou Shehata | 0–3 | Gharb El Qantara |
| 10 | Baladeyet Ismailia | 1–0 | MS Abou Souyer |
| 11 | MS Minyat Samanoud | 4–0 | MS Bedway |
| 12 | Ghazl Damietta | 3–1 | El Sharkia |
| 13 | Belbis | 1–0 | MS El Qaniyat |
| 14 | Talkha | 2–1 | MS Abou Kebir |
| 15 | MS Housh Eissa | 1–2 | MS Abou El Matamer |
| 16 | MS Qelein | 1–1 (2–4 p) | MS Kafr Bouleyn |
| 17 | Deskouk | 1–2 | Sporting Castle |
| 18 | MS Al Obour (Alexandria) | 0–2 | Al Masry (Al Saloum) |
| 19 | MS Kerdasa | 2–6 | Banha |
| 20 | MS Abou El Nemris | 1–0 | National Bank |
| 21 | Bahtim | 1–0 | Al Maady & Al Yacht |
5 September 2018
| 22 | Naser El Fekreia | 1–0 | MS El Qais |
| 23 | MS Al Baleyna | 0–0 (3–4 p) | Muslim Youths (Assiut) |
| 24 | MS Mit El Khouly Abdullah | 1–4 | Faqous |
| 25 | Dikernis | 3–0 | MS Damietta |
| 26 | Baltim | 0–1 | MS Matobis |
| 27 | Sakha | 1–3 | Al Hamoul |
| 28 | Shabab El Daba'a | 0–1 | Alexandria Petroleum |
| 29 | 6th of October City | 1–1 (6–5 p) | Plastic Shubra El Kheima |
| 30 | Al Masry (Cairo) | 1–2 | Al Said (Giza) |
| 31 | Ittihad El Shorta | 1–0 | Egypt Insurance |

The following teams received a bye for this round:

- 6 October (North Sinai)
- Abou Kebir
- Arab El Raml
- Ashmoun
- Assiut Petroleum
- Beni Ebeid
- Eastern Company
- Al Ghaba
- Ghazl Suez
- Helwan El A'am
- Al Hilal (Aswan)
- Al Hilal (El Daba'a)
- El Horreya
- Ittihad Nabarouh
- Kaskada
- Al Maragha
- Matar Taris
- Mega Sport
- Menouf
- El Montazah
- MS Al Amir
- MS Atsa
- MS Eitay El Baroud
- MS Koum Hamada
- MS Maghagha
- El Nobah
- Osmathon Tanta
- Planes Factory
- El Qanater El Khairiya
- El Qawmi
- Qena
- El Qouseiya
- Al Rebat & Al Anwar
- Al Said (El Mahalla)
- Samanoud
- El Senbellawein
- Sers El Layan
- Sheko
- Sporting Alexandria
- Taraji El Daba'a
- Telecom Egypt
- Workers (El Mansoura)

== Third Preliminary Round ==
Third Preliminary Round fixtures were played on 24, 25 and 26 September 2018. A total of 39 teams from the Egyptian Second Division entered at this stage of the competition. Damietta, El Tahrir and Al Walideya, all playing in the 2018–19 Egyptian Second Division, did not enter the competition. The results were as follows:

| Tie | Home Team | Score | Away Team |
24 September 2018
| 50 | Alexandria Petroleum | 0–1 | Abou Qir Fertilizers |
25 September 2018
| 1 | Sohag | 4–1 | Tahta |
| 2 | Al Salam (Esna) | 0–3 | Aswan |
| 3 | Al Hilal (Aswan) | 1–6 | Al Aluminium |
| 4 | Al Nasr Lel Taa'den | 4–0 | Al Maragha |
| 13 | Beni Suef | 2–0 | MS Ebshway |
Match abandoned after 77 minutes after MS Ebshway players stopped playing in protest of refereeing when the score was 1–0 to Beni Suef. The Egyptian Football Association later awarded Beni Suef a 2–0 win.
| 14 | Faiyum | 2–2 (5–6 p) | Telephonat Beni Suef |
| 20 | Media | 0–0 (4–5 p) | El Shams |
| 27 | Suez | 1–1 (2–1 p) | Al Merreikh |
| 31 | MS Minyat Samanoud | 3–1 | Talkha |
| 39 | Baladeyet El Mahalla | 0–1 | Osmathon Tanta |
| 40 | MS Tala | 1–1 (3–2 p) | Banha |
| 41 | Sers El Layan | 1–3 | Sidi Salem |
| 42 | Gomhoriat Shebin | 5–1 | Samanoud |
| 43 | Ghazl El Mahalla | 3–0 | Al Hamoul |
| 47 | Tanta | 1–1 (4–3 p) | Kafr El Sheikh |
| 51 | Al Hammam | 0–1 | Ala'ab Damanhour |
| 52 | El Horreya | 0–6 | Pharco |
| 53 | MS Abou El Matamer | 3–0 | Taraji El Daba'a |
| 55 | El Raja | 1–1 (0–3 p) | Olympic Club |
26 September 2018
| 5 | Workers (Farshout) | 0–1 | Muslim Youths (Qena) |
| 6 | Qena | 2–0 | Girga |
Match abandoned after 83 minutes after Girga players attacked the referee in protest of refereeing when the score was 2–0 to Qena. The Egyptian Football Association later awarded Qena a 2–0 win, even though the match ended with that result.
| 7 | Muslim Youths (Assiut) | 1–2 | Dayrout |
| 8 | Beni Mazar | 1–0 | El Qouseiya |
| 9 | Naser El Fekreia | 2–2 (4–2 p) | MS Naser Malawy |
| 10 | Abou Tig | 1–1 (4–2 p) | MS Maghagha |
| 11 | Assiut Petroleum | 0–2 | El Minya |
| 12 | Matar Taris | 1–2 | MS Atsa |
| 15 | Planes Factory | 1–2 | Al Nasr |
| 16 | Ittihad El Shorta | 2–1 | 6th of October City |
| 17 | Al Said (Giza) | 0–0 (6–5 p) | MS Abou El Nemris |
| 18 | Helwan El A'am | 1–1 (8–9 p) | Coca-Cola |
| 19 | Tersana | 5–1 | Kaskada |
| 21 | Telecom Egypt | 2–3 | FC Masr |
| 22 | Ceramica Cleopatra | 4–0 | El Qawmi |
| 23 | Al Ghaba | 1–0 | Eastern Company |
| 24 | Porto Suez | 2–1 | Gharb El Qantara |
| 25 | Port Fouad | 0–0 (2–4 p) | El Qanah |
| 26 | Ghazl Suez | 2–2 (4–5 p) | El Nobah |
| 28 | Baladeyet Ismailia | 1–0 | Abou Sakal |
| 29 | Al Rebat & Al Anwar | 0–1 | 6 October (North Sinai) |
| 30 | Faqous | 1–1 (3–2 p) | Dikernis |
| 32 | Mega Sport | 0–2 | MS Al Amir |
| 33 | Sheko | 2–1 | Abou Kebir |
| 34 | Belbis | 0–1 | El Mansoura |
| 35 | Ittihad Nabarouh | 1–1 (11–10 p) | Al Zarka |
| 36 | El Senbellawein | 2–2 (4–5 p) | Ghazl Damietta |
| 37 | Beni Ebeid | 3–1 | Workers (El Mansoura) |
| 38 | Sporting Castle | 1–0 | Arab El Raml |
| 44 | MS Matobis | 0–0 (5–3 p) | Al Said (El Mahalla) |
| 45 | Bahtim | 2–1 | Ashmoun |
| 46 | El Qanater El Khairiya | 1–0 | Menouf |
| 48 | Al Masry (Al Saloum) | 1–0 | MS Eitay El Baroud |
| 49 | MS Kafr Bouleyn | 1–1 (3–4 p) | El Montazah |
| 54 | Al Jazeera | 5–1 | MS Koum Hamada |
| 56 | Al Hilal (El Daba'a) | 1–0 | Sporting Alexandria |

== Fourth Preliminary Round ==
Fourth Preliminary Round fixtures were played on 29 and 30 September 2018. The results were as follows:

| Tie | Home Team | Score | Away Team |
29 September 2018
| 3 | Muslim Youths (Qena) | 2–1 | Qena |
| 4 | Dayrout | 0–1 | Beni Mazar |
| 5 | Naser El Fekreia | 4–0 | Abou Tig |
| 6 | El Minya | 3–0 | MS Atsa |
| 9 | Al Said (Giza) | 0–2 | Coca-Cola |
| 10 | Tersana | 1–0 | El Shams |
| 11 | FC Masr | 1–0 | Ceramica Cleopatra |
| 12 | Al Ghaba | 2–3 | Porto Suez |
| 13 | El Qanah | 2–2 (4–2 p) | El Nobah |
| 14 | Suez | 2–0 | Baladeyet Ismailia |
| 15 | Faqous | 2–0 | 6 October (North Sinai) |
| 16 | MS Minyat Samanoud | 1–0 | MS Al Amir |
| 18 | Ittihad Nabarouh | 2–1 | Ghazl Damietta |
| 19 | Beni Ebeid | 1–0 | Sporting Castle |
| 20 | Osmathon Tanta | 0–1 | MS Tala |
| 21 | Sidi Salem | 0–3 | Gomhoriat Shebin |
| 22 | Ghazl El Mahalla | 3–0 | MS Matobis |
| 23 | Bahtim | 1–0 | El Qanater El Khairiya |
| 25 | El Montazah | 0–3 | Abou Qir Fertilizers |
| 26 | Ala'ab Damanhour | 1–2 | Pharco |
| 27 | MS Abou El Matamer | 0–1 | Al Jazeera |
| 28 | Olympic Club | 5–0 | Al Hilal (El Daba'a) |
30 September 2018
| 1 | Sohag | 0–1 | Aswan |
| 2 | Al Aluminium | 1–0 | Al Nasr Lel Taa'den |
| 7 | Beni Suef | 1–1 (5–4 p) | Telephonat Beni Suef |
| 8 | Al Nasr | 2–2 (3–5 p) | Ittihad El Shorta |
| 17 | Sheko | 0–2 | El Mansoura |
| 24 | Tanta | 1–1 (4–3 p) | Al Masry (Al Saloum) |

== Fifth Preliminary Round ==
Fifth Preliminary Round fixtures were played on 3 October 2018. The results were as follows:

| Tie | Home Team | Score | Away Team |
| 1 | Aswan | 0–0 (4–5 p) | Al Aluminium |
| 2 | Muslim Youths (Qena) | 3–1 | Beni Mazar |
| 3 | Naser El Fekreia | 0–0 (4–3 p) | El Minya |
| 4 | Beni Suef | 0–0 (2–3 p) | Ittihad El Shorta |
| 5 | Coca-Cola | 0–2 | Tersana |
| 6 | FC Masr | 1–2 | Porto Suez |
| 7 | El Qanah | 2–1 | Suez |
| 8 | Faqous | 1–3 | MS Minyat Samanoud |
| 9 | El Mansoura | 0–0 (2–1 p) | Ittihad Nabarouh |
| 10 | Beni Ebeid | 2–2 (4–5 p) | MS Tala |
| 11 | Gomhoriat Shebin | 0–1 | Ghazl El Mahalla |
| 12 | Bahtim | 0–3 | Tanta |
| 13 | Abou Qir Fertilizers | 2–1 | Pharco |
| 14 | Al Jazeera | 2–2 (4–2 p) | Olympic Club |

== Competition proper ==
Winners from the Fifth Preliminary Round advance to the Round of 32, where teams from the Egyptian Premier League enter the competition.
