= 2016–17 Egyptian Second Division =

Egyptian Second Division
- Season: 2016–17
- Dates: 17 October 2016 – 21 May 2017
- Champions: Group A: Al Assiouty Sport; Group B: Al Nasr; Group C: El Raja
- Promoted: Group A: Al Assiouty Sport; Group B: Al Nasr; Group C: El Raja
- Relegated: Group A: Naser El Fekreia Tahta Al Badari Al Wasta MS Tamya; Group B: El Sekka El Hadid Damietta Eastern Company Telecom Egypt Manshiyat El Shohada; Group C: El Horreya BWADC Badr Dikernis Said El Mahalla
- Matches: 886
- Goals: 2,023 (2.28 per match)
- Biggest home win: Ceramica Cleopatra 7–0 Manshiyat El Shohada (28 October 2016); Sohag 7–0 MS Tamya (25 April 2017)
- Biggest away win: Al Wasta 0–5 Al Assiouty Sport (28 October 2016); Dikernis 0–5 El Raja (30 April 2017)
- Highest scoring: National Bank 4–5 FC Masr (14 May 2017)

The 2016–17 Egyptian Second Division (also known as dmc League for sponsorship reasons) was the 37th edition of the Egyptian Second Division, the top Egyptian semi-professional level for football clubs, since its establishment in 1977. The season began on 17 October 2016 and concluded on 21 May 2017. Fixtures for the 2016–17 season were announced on 26 September 2016.

On 6 April 2017, Al Assiouty Sport were the first team to secure the promotion to the 2017–18 Egyptian Premier League from Group A, after defeating Beni Suef 2–1.

On 28 April 2017, Al Nasr were officially promoted from Group B, after FC Masr, the second placed team, failed to defeat El Qanah as the match ended 0–0.

On 5 May 2017, the last day of Group C matches, El Raja managed to defeat Baladeyet El Mahalla 1–0 with a goal in the 95th minute in a dramatic match and secured the promotion to the Egyptian Premier League; had Baladeyet El Mahalla won or drawn, they would have promoted instead.

== Teams ==
A total of fifty-four teams competed in the league, including forty-two sides from the 2015–16 season, three relegated from the 2015–16 Egyptian Premier League and nine promoted from the 2015–16 Egyptian Third Division.

=== Stadia and locations ===
Note: Table lists in alphabetical order.

==== Group A ====
Locations of the 2016–17 Egyptian Second Division Group A teams

Club	City	Stadium	2015–16 season
Al Aluminium	Nag Hammadi	Aluminium Stadium	2nd in Second Division Group A
Al Assiouty Sport	Asyut	Al Assiouty Sport Stadium	1st in Second Division Group B
Al Badari	Al Badari	MS Al Badari Stadium	1st in Third Division Group B
Beni Suef	Beni Suef	Beni Suef Club Stadium	3rd in Second Division Group B
Dayrout	Dayrout	MS Abnub Stadium	6th in Second Division Group B
Fayoum	Fayoum	Fayoum Stadium	5th in Second Division Group B
El Gouna	El Gouna	El Gouna Stadium	4th in Second Division Group A
KIMA Aswan	Aswan	KIMA Aswan Stadium	1st in Third Division Group A
Al Madina Al Monawara	Luxor	Luxor Stadium	5th in Second Division Group A
El Minya	El Minya	University of El Minya Stadium	2nd in Second Division Group B
MS Tamya	Tamya	Damu Sport City Stadium	4th in Second Division Group B
Naser El Fekreia	Abou Qirqas	Naser El Fekreia Stadium	1st in Third Division Group C
Qena	Qena	Qena Stadium	3rd in Second Division Group A
Sohag	Sohag	Sohag Stadium	7th in Second Division Group A
Tahta	Tahta	Tahta Stadium	6th in Second Division Group A
Telephonat Beni Suef	Beni Suef	Al Assiouty Sport Stadium	7th in Second Division Group B
Al Wasta	Beni Suef	Beni Suef Club Stadium	8th in Second Division Group B

==== Group B ====
Locations of the 2016–17 Egyptian Second Division Group B teams

Club	City	Stadium	2015–16 season
Ceramica Cleopatra	Cairo	Cairo International Stadium	1st in Third Division Group D
Coca-Cola	Cairo	30 June Stadium	1st in Third Division Group E
Damietta	Damietta	Ras El Bar Stadium	2nd in Second Division Group D
Eastern Company	Cairo	Eastern Company Stadium	5th in Second Division Group C
FC Masr	Cairo	Cairo International Stadium	2nd in Second Division Group C
Gomhoriat Shebin	Shebin El Koum	Banha Stadium	7th in Second Division Group E
Ittihad El Shorta	Cairo	Police Academy Stadium	16th in Premier League
Kahraba Ismailia	Ismailia	Kahrabaa Ismailia Stadium	1st in Third Division Group F
Manshiyat El Shohada	Ismailia	Manshiyat El Shohada Stadium	7th in Second Division Group D
Al Merreikh	Port Said	Al Merreikh Stadium	5th in Second Division Group D
Al Nasr	Cairo	Al Nasr Stadium	3rd in Second Division Group C
National Bank	Cairo	National Bank of Egypt Stadium	6th in Second Division Group C
Nogoom El Mostakbal	Giza	Nogoom El Mostakbal Stadium	4th in Second Division Group C
El Qanah	Suez	Suez Canal Stadium	4th in Second Division Group D
El Sekka El Hadid	Cairo	El Sekka El Hadid Stadium	7th in Second Division Group C
Suez	Suez	Suez Stadium	3rd in Second Division Group D
Telecom Egypt	Cairo	Telecom Egypt Club Stadium	8th in Second Division Group C
Tersana	Cairo	30 June Stadium	1st in Second Division Group C
Al Zarka	Al Zarka	Al Zarka Stadium	6th in Second Division Group D

==== Group C ====
Locations of the 2016–17 Egyptian Second Division Group C teams

Club	City	Stadium	2015–16 season
Ala'ab Damanhour	Damanhour	Ala'ab Damanhour Stadium	1st in Second Division Group F
Badr	Wadi El Natrun	Badr Stadium	5th in Second Division Group F
Baladeyet El Mahalla	El Mahalla	Ghazl El Mahalla Stadium	3rd in Second Division Group E
BWADC	Abou Hommus	BWADC Stadium	1st in Third Division Group H
Dikernis	Dikernis	Dikernis Stadium	5th in Second Division Group E
Ghazl El Mahalla	El Mahalla	Ghazl El Mahalla Stadium	18th in Premier League
Al Hammam	Mersa Matruh	MS Al Hammam Stadium	8th in Second Division Group F
Haras El Hodoud	Alexandria	Haras El Hodoud Stadium	17th in Premier League
El Horreya	Mersa Matruh	MS Matruh Stadium	1st in Third Division Group I
Ittihad Nabarouh	Nabarouh	Ittihad Nabarouh Stadium	1st in Third Division Group G
Kafr El Sheikh	Kafr El Sheikh	Kafr El Sheikh Stadium	7th in Second Division Group F
El Mansoura	El Mansoura	Beni Ebied Club Stadium	2nd in Second Division Group E
MS Koum Hamada	Koum Hamada	MS Koum Hamada Stadium	6th in Second Division Group F
Olympic Club	Alexandria	Ezzedin Yacoub Stadium	3rd in Second Division Group F
Pharco	Alexandria	Borg El Arab Stadium	2nd in Second Division Group F
El Raja	Mersa Matruh	MS Matruh Stadium	4th in Second Division Group F
Said El Mahalla	El Mahalla	Ghazl El Mahalla Stadium	4th in Second Division Group E
Sherbeen	Sherbeen	Sherbeen Stadium	6th in Second Division Group E

== Results ==
=== League tables ===
==== Group A ====
Pos	Team	Pld	W	D	L	GF	GA	GD	Pts	Promotion, qualification or relegation
1	Al Assiouty Sport (C, P)	32	24	7	1	69	19	+50	79	Promotion to the Premier League
2	Sohag	32	17	9	6	42	20	+22	60	
3	El Gouna	32	16	10	6	48	31	+17	58	
4	Al Aluminium	32	16	6	10	37	28	+9	54	
5	Telephonat Beni Suef	32	14	9	9	46	36	+10	51	
6	Beni Suef	32	13	10	9	44	36	+8	49	
7	El Minya	32	11	10	11	37	31	+6	43	
8	Fayoum	32	9	14	9	24	25	−1	41	
9	Al Madina Al Monawara	32	9	13	10	23	29	−6	40	
10	KIMA Aswan	32	9	12	11	35	34	+1	39	
11	Dayrout	32	8	14	10	32	35	−3	38	
12	Qena	32	8	13	11	24	33	−9	37	
13	Naser El Fekreia (R)	32	8	12	12	29	31	−2	36	Relegation to the Third Division
14	Tahta (R)	32	8	12	12	29	40	−11	36	Relegation to the Third Division
15	Al Badari (R)	32	5	10	17	29	51	−22	25	Relegation to the Third Division
16	Al Wasta (R)	32	6	7	19	23	50	−27	25	Relegation to the Third Division
17	MS Tamya (R)	32	4	6	22	26	68	−42	18	Relegation to the Third Division

Source: Kooora
Rules for classification: 1) Points; 2) Goal difference; 3) Goal scored.
(C) Champions; (P) Promoted; (R) Relegated

==== Group B ====
Pos	Team	Pld	W	D	L	GF	GA	GD	Pts	Promotion, qualification or relegation
1	Al Nasr (C, P)	36	23	10	3	62	25	+37	79	Promotion to the Premier League
2	FC Masr	36	17	13	6	57	33	+24	64	
3	Suez	36	15	14	7	44	30	+14	59	
4	Ceramica Cleopatra	36	15	12	9	44	28	+16	57	
5	Coca-Cola	36	14	14	8	39	30	+9	56	
6	El Qanah	36	13	12	11	37	33	+4	51	
7	Gomhoriat Shebin	36	13	11	12	38	35	+3	50	
8	Nogoom El Mostakbal	36	12	11	13	47	48	−1	47	
9	Tersana	36	10	16	10	42	46	−4	46	
10	Kahrabaa Ismailia	36	12	10	14	29	34	−5	46	
11	Ittihad El Shorta	36	12	9	15	40	42	−2	45	
12	Al Merreikh	36	10	14	12	34	38	−4	44	
13	Al Zarka	36	10	13	13	41	47	−6	43	
14	National Bank	36	10	12	14	42	47	−5	42	
15	El Sekka El Hadid (R)	36	9	15	12	34	48	−14	42	Relegation to the Third Division
16	Damietta (R)	36	7	16	13	30	36	−6	37	Relegation to the Third Division
17	Eastern Company (R)	36	6	19	11	34	42	−8	37	Relegation to the Third Division
18	Telecom Egypt (R)	36	7	11	18	27	44	−17	32	Relegation to the Third Division
19	Manshiyat El Shohada (R)	36	6	10	20	35	70	−35	28	Relegation to the Third Division

Source: Kooora
Rules for classification: 1) Points; 2) Goal difference; 3) Goal scored.
(C) Champions; (P) Promoted; (R) Relegated

==== Group C ====
Pos	Team	Pld	W	D	L	GF	GA	GD	Pts	Promotion, qualification or relegation
1	El Raja (C, P)	34	23	7	4	51	20	+31	76	Promotion to the Premier League
2	Baladeyet El Mahalla	34	23	5	6	48	23	+25	74	
3	Haras El Hodoud	34	20	11	3	55	26	+29	71	
4	Pharco	34	18	11	5	56	30	+26	65	
5	Ghazl El Mahalla	34	14	14	6	40	26	+14	56	
6	El Mansoura	34	12	11	11	39	34	+5	47	
7	MS Koum Hamada	34	11	14	9	40	36	+4	47	
8	Ittihad Nabarouh	34	12	11	11	27	31	−4	47	
9	Ala'ab Damanhour	34	11	13	10	37	33	+4	46	
10	Olympic Club	34	13	7	14	45	43	+2	46	
11	Al Hammam	34	11	11	12	32	38	−6	44	
12	Kafr El Sheikh	34	11	10	13	41	38	+3	43	
13	Sherbeen	34	9	15	10	40	44	−4	42	
14	El Horreya (R)	34	7	15	12	28	33	−5	36	Relegation to the Third Division
15	BWADC (R)	34	6	9	19	25	47	−22	27	Relegation to the Third Division
16	Badr (R)	34	6	7	21	23	50	−27	25	Relegation to the Third Division
17	Dikernis (R)	34	4	6	24	21	59	−38	18	Relegation to the Third Division
18	Said El Mahalla (R)	34	4	5	25	22	59	−37	17	Relegation to the Third Division

Source: Kooora
Rules for classification: 1) Points; 2) Goal difference; 3) Goal scored.
(C) Champions; (P) Promoted; (R) Relegated

=== Results tables ===
==== Group A ====
Home \ Away	ALU	ASY	BAD	BSU	DAY	FAY	GOU	KIM	MAD	MIN	MST	NFK	QEN	SOH	TAH	TBS	WAS
Al Aluminium	—	1–3	5–1	1–0	3–1	2–1	2–1	2–0	0–0	1–0	0–0	0–0	1–0	1–0	0–2	2–3	2–1
Al Assiouty Sport	4–0	—	3–1	0–0	1–0	2–1	6–1	1–1	2–1	3–2	3–0	4–0	3–0	1–1	4–1	3–0	2–1
Al Badari	0–1	0–4	—	1–3	0–2	1–1	1–1	2–1	0–0	2–1	0–1	1–1	1–1	0–0	2–1	0–1	1–1
Beni Suef	1–1	1–2	3–2	—	3–1	0–0	1–1	1–1	3–0	2–2	3–1	2–1	1–1	1–0	2–0	0–1	1–0
Dayrout	0–1	0–1	2–1	1–1	—	1–1	1–1	0–0	0–0	2–1	4–2	2–0	0–0	1–0	1–1	2–2	4–3
Fayoum	0–0	0–1	1–0	1–1	0–0	—	0–0	2–1	0–0	1–0	2–0	0–2	2–1	0–2	0–0	1–1	1–1
El Gouna	1–0	0–1	2–1	2–2	2–1	1–0	—	0–0	2–1	1–0	1–0	1–0	3–1	1–1	5–1	5–1	3–0
KIMA Aswan	1–0	1–2	1–1	3–0	1–2	1–2	1–2	—	1–1	2–1	2–0	1–1	3–1	0–1	1–2	1–0	1–0
Al Madina Al Monawara	1–0	0–0	2–1	2–1	1–0	1–0	1–2	1–1	—	0–2	1–0	0–0	2–1	2–1	0–0	0–0	0–0
El Minya	0–1	1–1	4–3	2–0	2–1	2–0	1–0	0–0	0–0	—	2–2	0–0	0–0	1–2	2–1	4–3	2–0
MS Tamya	1–3	2–3	3–1	2–3	4–1	0–1	0–4	1–3	1–3	0–3	—	0–3	0–0	1–0	1–3	1–2	0–0
Naser El Fekreia	2–1	0–0	0–1	0–2	0–0	1–1	1–2	1–1	2–1	0–0	4–0	—	3–0	0–0	1–0	1–1	3–1
Qena	0–2	0–0	1–0	2–1	0–0	2–2	0–0	1–1	1–0	0–0	0–0	1–0	—	0–2	3–0	3–2	2–0
Sohag	1–1	1–0	2–1	1–0	1–1	1–0	0–0	1–0	2–2	1–0	7–0	2–0	1–0	—	3–1	2–1	2–1
Tahta	2–1	0–1	1–1	2–3	0–0	0–0	3–2	4–1	1–0	0–0	2–2	1–0	0–1	0–0	—	0–0	0–0
Telephonat Beni Suef	1–0	2–3	1–1	2–1	0–0	0–1	2–0	1–1	4–0	1–2	3–1	2–0	2–0	2–1	0–0	—	2–0
Al Wasta	0–2	0–5	0–1	0–1	2–1	0–2	1–1	0–2	1–0	1–0	1–0	3–2	1–1	1–3	3–0	0–3	—

Source: Kooora
Legend: Blue = home team win; Yellow = draw; Red = away team win.

==== Group B ====
Home \ Away	CCL	COC	DAM	EAS	FCM	GOM	ITS	KIS	MAN	MER	NAS	NBE	NOG	QAN	SKH	SUE	TEG	TER	ZAR
Ceramica Cleopatra	—	1–2	0–2	0–0	0–0	2–1	2–0	2–0	7–0	2–0	0–1	1–0	2–1	1–0	0–0	1–1	3–2	0–0	1–1
Coca-Cola	0–0	—	0–0	1–0	1–1	2–0	0–1	2–1	1–1	2–0	0–3	1–0	0–0	0–2	1–1	0–0	1–2	2–1	1–1
Damietta	0–1	0–1	—	0–0	1–0	0–0	1–2	1–1	0–1	0–0	0–0	4–2	0–2	1–0	2–2	0–0	1–0	1–1	1–1
Eastern Company	1–1	0–0	3–0	—	2–1	2–1	1–1	0–1	2–0	2–2	1–1	1–1	1–0	1–2	0–0	2–3	0–2	0–1	1–4
FC Masr	0–0	2–2	0–0	2–2	—	1–1	3–1	1–1	2–2	2–0	2–1	2–0	2–0	1–1	3–1	1–4	1–0	3–0	4–1
Gomhoriat Shebin	3–2	0–2	2–0	1–1	0–0	—	0–0	1–0	4–2	1–1	0–1	1–4	2–0	2–1	0–1	1–1	2–0	2–0	3–0
Ittihad El Shorta	1–0	1–0	3–1	2–2	0–2	0–1	—	1–2	1–2	1–1	3–2	3–0	1–0	0–1	1–2	1–2	1–2	3–3	1–0
Kahraba Ismailia	0–2	0–2	2–1	0–0	0–3	1–1	1–0	—	2–0	2–1	1–1	1–0	0–0	0–1	0–0	1–0	2–0	1–1	2–0
Manshiyat El Shohada	1–1	1–2	1–1	4–2	0–2	0–0	0–1	0–3	—	1–0	1–3	0–0	1–2	0–0	1–2	2–3	0–2	1–1	2–3
Al Merreikh	2–0	1–1	0–0	2–1	1–0	1–0	1–1	1–0	4–0	—	1–2	1–3	2–2	1–3	1–1	1–1	1–0	1–0	0–0
Al Nasr	2–1	2–1	1–0	1–1	3–2	1–0	1–1	1–0	6–1	2–0	—	1–0	2–0	2–0	2–0	1–0	4–1	1–1	2–0
National Bank	0–0	0–2	4–3	0–0	4–5	3–0	2–2	1–0	2–0	1–1	0–3	—	0–1	0–2	2–1	0–0	1–1	1–1	3–3
Nogoom El Mostakbal	0–1	2–2	3–2	2–0	0–1	2–3	2–0	2–1	3–3	1–0	3–4	0–0	—	0–0	2–2	4–3	1–0	3–1	3–2
El Qanah	1–2	0–0	1–1	1–1	0–0	0–1	1–0	3–0	2–1	0–2	2–2	0–3	2–0	—	2–0	1–0	3–0	1–1	1–1
El Sekka El Hadid	0–3	1–2	0–0	1–1	0–3	1–1	0–3	2–0	0–1	2–1	0–0	0–2	3–3	0–0	—	1–0	0–0	0–3	0–3
Suez	2–2	1–0	1–2	2–2	2–0	1–1	1–0	1–0	2–1	2–0	1–1	2–0	0–0	2–0	1–2	—	0–0	2–1	1–0
Telecom Egypt	0–2	2–3	0–0	0–0	1–1	1–0	2–1	1–2	0–2	0–1	0–0	1–1	0–0	3–1	1–3	0–0	—	0–1	1–2
Tersana	2–0	1–0	0–4	0–1	0–2	1–0	1–1	1–1	1–1	1–1	0–2	2–0	3–2	4–2	2–2	1–1	2–1	—	2–2
Al Zarka	2–1	1–1	1–0	2–0	1–2	0–2	0–1	0–0	2–1	1–1	1–0	1–2	2–1	0–0	1–3	0–1	1–1	1–1	—

Source: Kooora
Legend: Blue = home team win; Yellow = draw; Red = away team win.

==== Group C ====
Home \ Away	ADM	BAD	BMH	BWA	DIK	GMH	HAM	HRS	HOR	ITN	KSH	MAN	MSK	OLY	PHA	RAJ	SMH	SHE
Ala'ab Damanhour	—	1–1	1–1	1–0	1–0	0–0	2–0	1–1	0–0	0–1	2–0	1–1	0–0	2–2	3–3	1–2	2–0	0–1
Badr	0–2	—	0–1	2–3	1–0	0–0	1–1	1–2	2–1	3–0	2–1	1–1	0–3	0–2	0–2	0–0	1–0	0–1
Baladeyet El Mahalla	2–0	1–0	—	2–0	1–0	3–1	2–1	2–1	2–0	2–0	2–1	1–0	1–0	4–2	1–2	1–0	1–0	1–1
BWADC	2–4	2–0	0–1	—	0–1	1–0	0–0	0–0	1–1	1–1	0–1	1–2	0–1	1–0	1–2	0–1	2–1	1–1
Dikernis	1–2	1–1	0–1	1–1	—	1–4	0–2	1–1	2–1	0–1	1–2	0–0	1–1	1–2	0–2	0–5	0–0	2–1
Ghazl El Mahalla	2–0	3–0	2–1	3–0	2–0	—	1–1	0–2	2–0	0–0	2–1	0–2	1–0	1–0	2–1	1–3	2–1	3–0
Al Hammam	1–1	2–0	0–2	1–0	2–1	0–0	—	1–2	1–2	2–1	1–0	0–0	2–3	1–3	2–2	1–2	1–0	2–0
Haras El Hodoud	1–1	1–0	1–2	4–1	7–1	0–0	1–0	—	1–1	1–0	2–0	2–0	2–2	1–1	3–1	0–0	1–0	3–1
El Horreya	0–2	0–1	0–1	0–0	1–0	0–0	0–1	1–2	—	2–0	0–0	0–1	1–0	2–2	1–0	0–1	0–0	2–2
Ittihad Nabarouh	0–2	2–1	1–1	1–1	3–1	0–0	0–0	1–2	0–0	—	1–0	1–0	2–2	0–2	0–0	2–0	1–0	0–0
Kafr El Sheikh	0–0	1–1	2–2	0–1	3–0	1–1	5–0	1–2	1–1	1–2	—	1–1	2–0	2–1	2–1	0–1	2–1	2–1
El Mansoura	1–1	4–0	2–0	2–1	1–0	0–0	1–2	0–1	1–4	2–1	1–2	—	4–1	1–0	0–0	0–0	5–2	1–2
MS Koum Hamada	2–1	1–0	1–0	1–1	2–1	0–0	0–0	1–2	1–1	0–1	1–1	2–0	—	4–1	1–4	1–0	3–0	0–0
Olympic Club	1–2	1–0	1–3	2–1	2–0	0–1	2–3	1–1	1–1	1–2	0–0	3–0	1–0	—	2–0	1–2	2–0	1–0
Pharco	1–0	3–1	1–0	2–0	2–0	3–1	1–0	0–0	1–1	2–0	3–2	1–1	2–2	2–0	—	0–0	2–1	4–0
El Raja	3–1	2–0	1–0	3–1	2–1	2–2	2–0	1–0	2–1	2–0	2–0	1–0	1–1	2–1	1–1	—	4–0	2–1
Said El Mahalla	1–0	1–0	0–2	2–0	0–2	2–2	1–1	2–3	1–2	0–2	1–3	0–2	1–1	2–3	0–3	0–1	—	2–1
Sherbeen	2–0	4–3	1–1	3–1	2–1	1–1	0–0	1–2	1–1	0–0	1–1	2–2	2–2	1–1	2–2	2–0	2–0	—

Source: Kooora
Legend: Blue = home team win; Yellow = draw; Red = away team win.
