= 2014–15 Egyptian Second Division =

Egyptian Second Division
- Season: 2014–15
- Dates: 18 September 2014 – 14 June 2015
- Promoted: Promotion Group A: Aswan; Promotion Group B: El Entag El Harby; Promotion Group C: Ghazl El Mahalla
- Relegated: Group A: MS Al Zahraa KIMA Aswan Muslim Youths (Qena) Sokar Armant; Group B: Minyat El Hayt MS Maghagha MS Naser Malawy Naser El Fekreia; Group C: Banha Media El Shams Bahtim; Group D: Manshiyat El Shohada Faqous Ghazl Damietta Suez Fertilizers; Group E: Ittihad Nabarouh Belkas MS Tala Al Hamoul; Group F: Koum Hamada Ghazl Kafr El Dawar BWADC Taraji El Daba'a
- Matches: 909
- Goals: 2,578 (2.84 per match)
- Biggest home win: Al Aluminium 7–0 Sokar Armant (20 November 2014); Manshiyat El Shohada 7–0 Suez Fertilizers (2 April 2015); El Mansoura 7–0 Belkas (14 April 2015); Al Merreikh 7–0 Suez Fertilizers (26 April 2015); Baladeyet El Mahalla 7–0 Belkas (6 May 2015)
- Biggest away win: Media 0–6 El Entag El Harby (27 November 2014); MS Tala 0–6 El Mansoura (2 April 2015)
- Highest scoring: Asyut Petroleum 6–4 MS Tamya (5 February 2015)

The 2014–15 Egyptian Second Division was the 35th edition of the Egyptian Second Division, the top Egyptian semi-professional level for football clubs, since its establishment in 1977. The season began on 18 September 2014 and concluded on 14 June 2015.

Aswan, El Entag El Harby and Ghazl El Mhalla won Promotion Group A, Group B and Group C respectively and secured the promotion to the 2015–16 Egyptian Premier League.

== Teams ==
=== Group A ===
Club	City
Al Aluminium	Nag Hammadi
Aswan	Aswan
Gharb Sohel	Sohel Island
KIMA Aswan	Aswan
Al Madina Al Monawara	Luxor
Al Maragha	Sohag
MS Al Zahraa	Luxor
Muslim Youths (Qena)	Qena
Al Nasr Lel Taa'den	Aswan
Ras Gharib	Ras Gharib
Sokar Armant	Armant
Sohag	Sohag
Tahta	Tahta

=== Group B ===
Club	City
Asyut Petroleum	Asyut
Beni Mazar	Beni Mazar
Beni Suef	Beni Suef
Fayoum	Fayoum
El Minya	El Minya
Minyat El Hayt	Fayoum
MS Maghagha	Maghagha
MS Naser Malawy	Malawy
MS Samalout	Samalout
MS Tamya	Tamya
Naser El Fekreia	Abou Qirqas
Telephonat Beni Suef	Beni Suef
Al Wasta	Beni Suef

=== Group C ===
Club	City
Bahtim	El Qalyubia
Banha	Banha
Eastern Company	Giza
Egypt Insurance	Cairo
El Entag El Harby	Cairo
FC Masr	Cairo
Media	Cairo
Nogoom El Mostakbal	Giza
El Sekka El Hadid	Cairo
El Shams	Cairo
Sokar El Hawamdia	Giza
Telecom Egypt	Cairo
Tersana	Giza

=== Group D ===
Club	City
Damietta	Damietta
Faqous	Faqous
Ghazl Damietta	Damietta
Kahraba Ismailia	Ismailia
Kahraba Talkha	Talkha
Manshiyat El Shohada	Ismailia
Al Merreikh	Port Said
MS Abou Souyer	Ismailia
Port Fouad	Port Said
El Qanah	Ismailia
El Sharkia	El Sharkia
Suez	Suez
Suez Fertilizers	Suez

=== Group E ===
Club	City
Belkas	Belkas
Baladeyet El Mahalla	El Mahalla
Dikernis	Dikernis
Ghazl El Mahalla	El Mahalla
Gomhoriat Shebin	Shebin El Koum
Al Hamoul	Al Hamoul
Ittihad Nabarouh	El Dakahlia
El Mansoura	El Mansoura
MS Tala	Tala
Said El Mahalla	El Mahalla
El Senbellawein	El Senbellawein
Sers El Layan	El Monufia
Sherbeen	Sherbeen

=== Group F ===
Club	City
Abou Qir Fertilizers	Alexandria
BWADC	El Beheira
Ghazl Kafr El Dawar	Kafr El Dawar
Al Hammam	Mersa Matruh
Kafr El Sheikh	Kafr El Sheikh
Koum Hamada	El Beheira
Maleyat Kafr El Zayat	El Gharbia
MS Koum Hamaa	El Beheira
Olympic Club	Alexandria
Pharco	Alexandria
Shabab El Daba'a	El Daba'a
Tanta	Tanta
Taraji El Daba'a	El Daba'a

== Standings ==
=== Group A ===
Pos	Team	Pld	W	D	L	GF	GA	GD	Pts	Promotion, qualification or relegation
1	Al Aluminium	24	15	6	3	55	21	+34	51	Qualification to Promotion Group A
2	Aswan	24	15	5	4	45	20	+25	50	Qualification to Promotion Group A
3	Sohag	24	14	8	2	37	17	+20	50	Qualification to Promotion Group A
4	Al Nasr Lel Taa'den	24	11	7	6	38	26	+12	40	
5	Tahta	24	9	6	9	29	27	+2	33	
6	Gharb Sohel	24	8	8	8	42	42	0	32	
7	Al Madina Al Monawara	24	8	8	8	23	28	−5	32	
8	Ras Gharib	24	8	6	10	31	42	−11	30	
9	Al Maragha	24	5	12	7	30	33	−3	27	
10	MS Al Zahraa (R)	24	6	9	9	24	30	−6	27	Relegation to the Third Division
11	KIMA Aswan (R)	24	4	10	10	15	23	−8	22	Relegation to the Third Division
12	Muslim Youths (Qena) (R)	24	2	7	15	23	49	−26	13	Relegation to the Third Division
13	Sokar Armant (R)	24	3	4	17	16	50	−34	13	Relegation to the Third Division

Source: Kooora
Rules for classification: 1) Points; 2) Goal difference; 3) Goal scored.
(R) Relegated

=== Group B ===
Pos	Team	Pld	W	D	L	GF	GA	GD	Pts	Promotion, qualification or relegation
1	El Minya	24	17	7	0	55	15	+40	58	Qualification to Promotion Group A
2	Al Wasta	24	16	7	1	41	13	+28	55	Qualification to Promotion Group A
3	Telephonat Beni Suef	24	16	5	3	45	22	+23	53	Qualification to Promotion Group A
4	Beni Suef	24	11	8	5	42	28	+14	41	
5	Fayoum	24	10	7	7	36	29	+7	37	
6	Asyut Petroleum	24	8	8	8	42	28	+14	32	
7	Beni Mazar	24	7	9	8	37	37	0	30	
8	MS Tamya	24	9	3	12	38	49	−11	30	
9	MS Samalout	24	6	8	10	32	36	−4	26	
10	Minyat El Hayt (R)	24	5	4	15	22	49	−27	19	Relegation to the Third Division
11	MS Maghagha (R)	24	5	4	15	19	46	−27	19	Relegation to the Third Division
12	MS Naser Malawy (R)	24	4	3	17	18	44	−26	15	Relegation to the Third Division
13	Naser El Fekreia (R)	24	3	5	16	18	49	−31	14	Relegation to the Third Division

Source: Kooora
Rules for classification: 1) Points; 2) Goal difference; 3) Goal scored.
(R) Relegated

=== Group C ===
Pos	Team	Pld	W	D	L	GF	GA	GD	Pts	Promotion, qualification or relegation
1	Eastern Company	24	15	6	3	47	18	+29	51	Qualification to Promotion Group B
2	El Sekka El Hadid	24	11	7	6	32	26	+6	40	Qualification to Promotion Group B
3	El Entag El Harby	24	9	10	5	42	27	+15	37	Qualification to Promotion Group B
4	FC Masr	24	9	10	5	33	24	+9	37	
5	Tersana	24	9	9	6	33	26	+7	36	
6	Nogoom El Mostakbal	24	8	11	5	30	24	+6	35	
7	Telecom Egypt	24	7	9	8	27	28	−1	30	
8	Sokar El Hawamdia	24	8	6	10	20	25	−5	30	
9	Egypt Insurance	24	7	8	9	19	20	−1	29	
10	Banha (R)	24	6	10	8	16	17	−1	28	Relegation to the Third Division
11	Media (R)	24	4	10	10	21	42	−21	22	Relegation to the Third Division
12	El Shams (R)	24	4	9	11	22	39	−17	21	Relegation to the Third Division
13	Bahtim (R)	24	2	9	13	17	43	−26	15	Relegation to the Third Division

Source: Kooora
Rules for classification: 1) Points; 2) Goal difference; 3) Goal scored.
(R) Relegated

=== Group D ===
Pos	Team	Pld	W	D	L	GF	GA	GD	Pts	Promotion, qualification or relegation
1	Al Merreikh	24	13	8	3	43	20	+23	47	Qualification to Promotion Group B
2	El Qanah	24	11	13	0	33	10	+23	46	Qualification to Promotion Group B
3	El Sharkia	24	11	9	4	30	18	+12	42	Qualification to Promotion Group B
4	MS Abou Souyer	24	12	5	7	29	16	+13	41	
5	Suez	24	10	8	6	30	20	+10	38	
6	Damietta	24	9	9	6	21	17	+4	36	
7	Port Fouad	24	7	9	8	24	29	−5	30	
8	Kahraba Talkha	24	6	10	8	22	24	−2	28	
9	Kahraba Ismailia	24	6	9	9	27	28	−1	27	
10	Manshiyat El Shohada (R)	24	6	9	9	26	27	−1	27	Relegation to the Third Division
11	Faqous (R)	23	6	7	10	30	40	−10	25	Relegation to the Third Division
12	Ghazl Damietta (R)	24	3	11	10	25	33	−8	20	Relegation to the Third Division
13	Suez Fertilizers (R)	24	0	4	20	8	66	−58	4	Relegation to the Third Division

Source: Kooora
Rules for classification: 1) Points; 2) Goal difference; 3) Goal scored.
(R) Relegated

=== Group E ===
Pos	Team	Pld	W	D	L	GF	GA	GD	Pts	Promotion, qualification or relegation
1	El Mansoura	24	20	3	1	59	12	+47	63	Qualification to Promotion Group C
2	Ghazl El Mahalla	24	16	5	3	40	18	+22	53	Qualification to Promotion Group C
3	Baladeyet El Mahalla	24	15	5	4	46	14	+32	50	Qualification to Promotion Group C
4	Said El Mahalla	24	10	7	7	34	23	+11	37	
5	Gomhoriat Shebin	24	8	13	3	32	24	+8	37	
6	Sers El Layan	24	10	7	7	25	21	+4	37	
7	Sherbeen	24	7	10	7	25	26	−1	31	
8	El Senbellawein	24	7	10	7	22	23	−1	31	
9	Dikernis	24	7	7	10	24	31	−7	28	
10	Ittihad Nabarouh (R)	24	3	13	8	17	25	−8	22	Relegation to the Third Division
11	Belkas (R)	24	2	6	16	21	55	−34	12	Relegation to the Third Division
12	MS Tala (R)	24	3	2	19	21	62	−41	11	Relegation to the Third Division
13	Al Hamoul (R)	24	2	4	18	19	51	−32	10	Relegation to the Third Division

Source: Kooora
Rules for classification: 1) Points; 2) Goal difference; 3) Goal scored.
(R) Relegated

=== Group F ===
Pos	Team	Pld	W	D	L	GF	GA	GD	Pts	Promotion, qualification or relegation
1	Pharco	24	12	9	3	41	21	+20	45	Qualification to Promotion Group C
2	Al Hammam	24	13	5	6	28	18	+10	44	Qualification to Promotion Group C
3	Abou Qir Fertilizers	24	12	7	5	38	25	+13	43	Qualification to Promotion Group C
4	Olympic Club	24	11	9	4	34	23	+11	42	
5	Tanta	24	11	6	7	47	32	+15	39	
6	Kafr El Sheikh	24	10	7	7	30	24	+6	37	
7	Shabab El Daba'a	24	9	8	7	31	27	+4	35	
8	Maleyat Kafr El Zayat	24	8	5	11	32	38	−6	29	
9	MS Koum Hamada	24	7	7	10	19	31	−12	28	
10	Koum Hamada (R)	24	6	9	9	26	31	−5	27	Relegation to the Third Division
11	Ghazl Kafr El Dawar (R)	24	6	7	11	30	32	−2	25	Relegation to the Third Division
12	BWADC (R)	24	4	9	11	24	39	−15	21	Relegation to the Third Division
13	Taraji El Daba'a (R)	24	1	4	19	15	54	−39	7	Relegation to the Third Division

Source: Kooora
Rules for classification: 1) Points; 2) Goal difference; 3) Goal scored.
(R) Relegated

== Promotion groups ==
=== Promotion Group A ===
Pos	Team	Pld	W	D	L	GF	GA	GD	Pts	Promotion, qualification or relegation
1	Aswan (P)	5	4	1	0	8	2	+6	13	Promotion to the Premier League
2	Al Aluminium	5	2	3	0	5	3	+2	9	
3	El Minya	5	2	1	2	7	6	+1	7	
4	Sohag	5	1	3	1	5	3	+2	6	
5	Al Wasta	5	1	2	2	6	8	−2	5	
6	Telephonat Beni Suef	5	0	0	5	3	12	−9	0	

Source: Kooora
Rules for classification: 1) Points; 2) Goal difference; 3) Goal scored.
(P) Promoted

=== Promotion Group B ===
Pos	Team	Pld	W	D	L	GF	GA	GD	Pts	Promotion, qualification or relegation
1	El Entag El Harby (P)	5	2	3	0	8	5	+3	9	Promotion to the Premier League
2	El Sharkia	5	3	0	2	7	5	+2	9	
3	El Qanah	5	2	1	2	5	5	0	7	
4	Eastern Company	5	1	2	2	5	6	−1	5	
5	Al Merreikh	5	1	2	2	3	4	−1	5	
6	El Sekka El Hadid	5	1	2	2	5	8	−3	5	

Source: Kooora
Rules for classification: 1) Points; 2) Goal difference; 3) Goal scored.
(P) Promoted

=== Promotion Group C ===
Pos	Team	Pld	W	D	L	GF	GA	GD	Pts	Promotion, qualification or relegation
1	Ghazl El Mahalla (P)	5	3	1	1	7	3	+4	10	Promotion to the Premier League
2	Baladeyet El Mahalla	5	3	1	1	8	5	+3	10	
3	Pharco	5	1	3	1	7	7	0	6	
4	El Mansoura	5	1	3	1	3	3	0	6	
5	Abou Qir Fertilizers	5	1	2	2	2	6	−4	5	
6	Al Hammam	5	0	2	3	3	6	−3	2	

Source: Kooora
Rules for classification: 1) Points; 2) Goal difference; 3) Goal scored.
(P) Promoted
