= 2022–23 Egyptian Third Division =

Egyptian Third Division
- Season: 2022–23
- Dates: 10 October 2022 – 3 June 2023
- Matches: 1,550
- Goals: 3,705 (2.39 per match)

The 2022–23 Egyptian Third Division was the 43rd edition of the Egyptian Third Division, the second Egyptian semi-professional level for football clubs, since its establishment in 1977. The season started on 10 October 2022, and concluded on 3 June 2023.

This was the last season for the league to represent the third-tier league of the Egyptian football league system. Starting from the 2023–24 season, two new leagues, Second Division A (professional league, second tier) and Second Division B (semi-professional league, third tier) replaced the existing Egyptian Second Division; which meant that the Third Division would be level four starting from that season.

Makadi, Nogoom, and Raya Ghazl Kafr El Dawar won the promotion play-offs, and promoted to the inaugural edition of the Egyptian Second Division A.

== Teams ==
- 6th of October
- Abou Kasah
- Abou El Reesh
- Abou Sakal
- Abou Tig
- Al Ahly (El Monshah)
- Ala'ab Damanhour
- Alexandria Petroleum
- Almaza
- Alo Egypt
- Ashmoun
- Asyut
- Al Badari
- Badr
- Bahtim
- Baltim
- Belbeis
- Belqas City
- Benha
- Beni Ebeid
- Beni Mazar
- Beni Suef
- Bilqas
- Bir Al Abd
- Biyala
- Borussia Egypt
- BWADC
- Cascada
- Damietta
- Delphi
- Desouk
- Egypt Stars
- Esco
- Faqous
- Al Fayrouz
- Fleet Club
- El Gamarek
- Ghazl Damietta
- Ghazl Shebin
- Guinness
- Helwan El Aam
- HFC
- Al Hilal (Aswan)
- El Horreya
- Horse Owners' Club
- Ittihad El Shorta
- Al Jazeera
- Koum Hamada
- Luxor
- Makadi
- Al Maadi & Al Yacht
- Maleyat Kafr El Zayat
- Manshiyat El Shohada
- Manshiyat Naser
- Al Maragha
- El Marg
- Matar Taris
- Matruh
- Menouf
- Al Merreikh
- Minyat El Nasr
- Misr Insurance
- Mit Khalaf
- El Montaza
- MS Abou El Matamir
- MS Abou El Namras
- MS Abou Ragwan
- MS Abou Tisht
- MS Abou Zenima
- MS Aga
- MS Arish
- MS Atsa
- MS Batta
- MS El Dabaa
- MS El Delengat
- MS Edfu
- MS Esna
- MS Faiyum
- MS Ibshaway
- MS Itay El Baroud
- MS El Kazazin
- MS El Kherba
- MS Koum Hamada
- MS Maghagha
- MS Martyr Ahmed El Mansi
- MS Masr
- MS Minyat Samanoud
- MS Naser Mallawi
- MS El Obour
- MS Qutur
- MS Salem El Hersh
- MS El Serw
- MS Sinnuris
- MS Sohag
- MS Sol
- MS Tala
- MS Toukh
- MS El Tour
- MS El Wadi
- Naser El Fekreia
- Al Nasr (Arish)
- Nogoom
- El Nuba
- Othmason Tanta
- Plastic Shubra El Kheima
- Port Fouad
- Pyramids Gardens
- Qeft
- Qena
- Qus
- Quesna
- El Qusiya
- El Raja
- Ras El Bar
- Raya Ghazl Kafr El Dawar
- Al Rebat & Al Anwar
- El Said (Giza)
- Said El Mahalla
- Sakha
- El Salloum
- Samanoud
- El Sekka El Hadid (Ismailia)
- Sers Al Layanah
- El Shams
- El Sharkia
- Sharm El Sheikh
- Shebin El Qanater
- Sherbeen
- Shoban Badaway
- Shoban Al Maragha
- Sidi Salem
- Sinai Star
- Sohag
- South Sinai
- Sporting Castle
- El Tahrir (Aswan)
- Tahta
- Team FC
- Al Wasta
- El Zaafran
- Al Zarka
- El Zohour

== Format ==
The league consists of 142 teams divided geographically into 13 groups, with each group containing a different number of teams, depending on clubs' hometowns:

- Group A, B, C and D for teams from Upper Egypt.
- Group E and F for teams from Greater Cairo.
- Group G for teams from north-eastern governorates.
- Group H for teams from Sinai Peninsula.
- Group I, J and K for teams from central and northern governorates.
- Group L for teams from Alexandria and Matruh.

The number of promoted and relegated teams differs from a group to another, according to the competition's regulation for the 2022–23 season.

The top team from each group advance to the promotion play-offs, to decide the three promoted teams to the inaugural Egyptian Second Division A season. Teams that lose the play-offs, alongside teams finishing second (and third in some groups) in the regular season, will participate in the first-ever Egyptian Second Division B season, which will represent the third-tier league of the Egyptian football league system starting from the following season. Teams finishing in last place (and second from bottom in some groups) will be relegated to the Egyptian Fourth Division.

Group H is divided into two groups, H1 for teams from North Sinai, and H2 for teams from South Sinai. The top team from H1 advance to the promotion play-offs, while the second-placed team in that group face the first-placed team from H2 to decide the promoted team to the second division B. The last placed team in both groups face each other to decide the relegated team to the fourth division.

== League tables ==
=== Group A ===
Pos	Team	Pld	W	D	L	GF	GA	GD	Pts	Promotion, qualification or relegation
1	Qus (Z)	16	10	5	1	32	15	+17	35 (Note: Teams are ranked on head-to-head record.)	Qualification for Second Division A/B play-offs
2	Luxor (Z)	16	11	2	3	29	13	+16	35	Promotion to Second Division B
3	Qena	16	10	4	2	23	8	+15	34	
4	MS Edfu	16	5	3	8	14	19	−5	18	
5	El Tahrir (Aswan)	16	5	3	8	15	22	−7	18	
6	MS Esna	16	3	6	7	13	18	−5	15	
7	Abou El Reesh	16	4	3	9	14	25	−11	15	
8	Qeft	16	3	5	8	10	17	−7	14	
9	Al Hilal (Aswan) (R)	16	2	7	7	14	27	−13	13	Relegation to Fourth Division

Source: EFA - Luxor branch
Rules for classification: 1) Points; 2) Head-to-Head points; 3) Head-to-Head goal difference; 4) Head-to-Head goals scored; 5) Goal difference; 6) Goals scored.
(Note: Head-to-head record is used only if needed to decide teams for promotion or teams for relegation).
(R) Relegated; (Z) Promoted to Second Division B.

=== Group B ===
Pos	Team	Pld	W	D	L	GF	GA	GD	Pts	Promotion, qualification or relegation
1	Makadi (O, P)	14	10	2	2	28	10	+18	32	Qualification for Second Division A/B play-offs
2	Tahta (Z)	14	8	3	3	18	7	+11	27	Promotion to Second Division B
3	MS Sohag	14	8	1	5	15	14	+1	25	
4	Shoban Al Maragha	14	5	4	5	15	15	0	19	
5	MS Abou Tisht	14	6	0	8	14	23	−9	18	
6	Sohag	14	3	7	4	18	16	+2	16	
7	Al Maragha	14	2	7	5	12	15	−3	13	
8	Al Ahly (El Monshah) (R)	14	1	2	11	8	28	−20	5	Relegation to Fourth Division

Source: Shoban Al Maragha SC
Rules for classification: 1) Points; 2) Head-to-Head points; 3) Head-to-Head goal difference; 4) Head-to-Head goals scored; 5) Goal difference; 6) Goals scored.
(Note: Head-to-head record is used only if needed to decide teams for promotion or teams for relegation).
(O) Play-off winners; (P) Promoted to Second Division A; (R) Relegated; (Z) Promoted to Second Division B.

=== Group C ===
Pos	Team	Pld	W	D	L	GF	GA	GD	Pts	Promotion, qualification or relegation
1	MS Maghagha (Z)	14	7	5	2	21	15	+6	26	Qualification for Second Division A/B play-offs
2	Beni Mazar (Z)	14	6	7	1	18	8	+10	25 (Note: Teams are ranked on head-to-head record.)	Promotion to Second Division B
3	El Qusiya	14	7	4	3	24	14	+10	25	
4	Naser El Fekreia	14	6	3	5	18	18	0	21	
5	MS Naser Mallawi	14	4	4	6	15	16	−1	16	
6	Asyut	14	3	4	7	17	21	−4	13	
7	Al Badari	14	3	4	7	14	19	−5	13	
8	Abou Tig	14	3	3	8	8	24	−16	12	Reprieved from relegation to Fourth Division (Note: On 8 August 2023, the EFA announced that the first leg match involving Abou Tig and Naser El Fekreia was awarded as a 2–0 win to the latter, after Abou Tig fielded an illegible player, with the original scoreline being 1–1. This resulted in Al Badari, who were bottom of the table by the end of the season, leaving the relegation zone and being replaced by Abou Tig. Abou Tig later submitted an appeal against the decision, stating that it violated the fifth article of the competition's regulations, which stipulate that any complaint regarding a match must be made within only 48 hours afterward. On 7 September, Abou Tig won the appeal and were reprieved from relegation, and remained in the Third Division for the next season.)

Source: El Qusiya SC
Rules for classification: 1) Points; 2) Head-to-Head points; 3) Head-to-Head goal difference; 4) Head-to-Head goals scored; 5) Goal difference; 6) Goals scored.
(Note: Head-to-head record is used only if needed to decide teams for promotion or teams for relegation).
(Z) Promoted to Second Division B.

=== Group D ===
Pos	Team	Pld	W	D	L	GF	GA	GD	Pts	Promotion, qualification or relegation
1	Al Wasta (Z)	16	11	3	2	34	13	+21	36	Qualification for Second Division A/B play-offs
2	Egypt Stars (Z)	16	11	2	3	31	15	+16	35	Promotion to Second Division B
3	Beni Suef	16	11	1	4	31	16	+15	34	
4	MS Faiyum	16	8	2	6	20	12	+8	26	
5	MS Sinnuris	16	6	3	7	25	34	−9	21	
6	MS Atsa	16	4	4	8	18	24	−6	16	
7	Abou Kasah	16	3	5	8	19	34	−15	14	
8	MS Ibshaway	16	4	1	11	20	37	−17	13	
9	Matar Taris	16	1	5	10	17	30	−13	8	Reprieved from relegation to Fourth Division (Note: Matar Taris were reprieved from relegation to the Fourth Division, in order to balance the number of teams in Group D of the Third Division in the following season.)

Source: Mr. Ragab El Wagih
Rules for classification: 1) Points; 2) Head-to-Head points; 3) Head-to-Head goal difference; 4) Head-to-Head goals scored; 5) Goal difference; 6) Goals scored.
(Note: Head-to-head record is used only if needed to decide teams for promotion or teams for relegation).
(Z) Promoted to Second Division B.

=== Group E ===
Pos	Team	Pld	W	D	L	GF	GA	GD	Pts	Promotion, qualification or relegation
1	Nogoom (O, P)	24	21	1	2	56	12	+44	64	Qualification for Second Division A/B play-offs
2	Misr Insurance (Z)	24	16	5	3	51	18	+33	53	Promotion to Second Division B
3	Team FC (Z)	24	15	5	4	39	20	+19	50	Promotion to Second Division B
4	Helwan El Aam	24	10	5	9	24	25	−1	35	
5	MS Abou El Namras	24	10	4	10	33	42	−9	34	
6	Manshiyat Naser	24	9	6	9	24	29	−5	33	
7	Al Maadi & Al Yacht	24	8	6	10	25	30	−5	30	
8	MS Sol	24	7	7	10	26	27	−1	28	
9	El Said (Giza)	24	8	4	12	24	32	−8	28	
10	Cascada	24	6	6	12	28	35	−7	24	
11	Pyramids Gardens	24	6	6	12	21	32	−11	24	
12	Guinness (R)	24	5	6	13	21	43	−22	21	Relegation to Fourth Division
13	MS Abou Ragwan (R)	24	3	3	18	19	46	−27	12	Relegation to Fourth Division

Source: Mr. Mahmoud Salah
Rules for classification: 1) Points; 2) Head-to-Head points; 3) Head-to-Head goal difference; 4) Head-to-Head goals scored; 5) Goal difference; 6) Goals scored.
(Note: Head-to-head record is used only if needed to decide teams for promotion or teams for relegation).
(O) Play-off winners; (P) Promoted to Second Division A; (R) Relegated; (Z) Promoted to Second Division B.

=== Group F ===
Pos	Team	Pld	W	D	L	GF	GA	GD	Pts	Promotion, qualification or relegation
1	Ittihad El Shorta (Z)	24	16	5	3	39	13	+26	53	Qualification for Second Division A/B play-offs
2	Alo Egypt (Z)	24	15	7	2	36	19	+17	52	Promotion to Second Division B
3	El Shams (Z)	24	13	6	5	43	22	+21	45	Promotion to Second Division B
4	Benha	24	12	7	5	33	18	+15	43	
5	Esco	24	9	10	5	24	20	+4	37	
6	El Marg	24	8	6	10	28	27	+1	30	
7	Bahtim	24	8	4	12	19	30	−11	28	
8	MS Toukh	24	6	8	10	27	32	−5	26	
9	Plastic Shubra El Kheima	24	7	4	13	30	39	−9	25	
10	Almaza	24	6	6	12	27	37	−10	24	
11	MS Batta	24	6	6	12	22	40	−18	24	
12	HFC (R)	24	6	4	14	29	46	−17	22	Relegation to Fourth Division
13	Shebin El Qanater (R)	24	5	5	14	21	35	−14	20	Relegation to Fourth Division

Source: EFA - Cairo branch
Rules for classification: 1) Points; 2) Head-to-Head points; 3) Head-to-Head goal difference; 4) Head-to-Head goals scored; 5) Goal difference; 6) Goals scored.
(Note: Head-to-head record is used only if needed to decide teams for promotion or teams for relegation).
(R) Relegated; (Z) Promoted to Second Division B.

=== Group G ===
Pos	Team	Pld	W	D	L	GF	GA	GD	Pts	Promotion, qualification or relegation
1	Al Merreikh (Z)	20	13	5	2	34	14	+20	44	Qualification for Second Division A/B play-offs
2	Port Fouad (Z)	20	11	6	3	34	16	+18	39	Promotion to Second Division B
3	El Sharkia	20	11	5	4	26	15	+11	38	
4	El Gamarek	20	8	6	6	24	23	+1	30	
5	Al Rebat & Al Anwar	20	6	8	6	17	14	+3	26	
6	Borussia Egypt	20	6	8	6	23	23	0	26	
7	El Nuba	20	6	7	7	23	20	+3	25	
8	Belbeis	20	5	8	7	19	23	−4	23	
9	Manshiyat El Shohada	20	6	5	9	16	26	−10	23	
10	Faqous	20	3	6	11	17	28	−11	15	
11	El Sekka El Hadid (Ismailia) (R)	20	1	4	15	17	48	−31	7	Relegation to Fourth Division

Source: Port Fouad SC
Rules for classification: 1) Points; 2) Head-to-Head points; 3) Head-to-Head goal difference; 4) Head-to-Head goals scored; 5) Goal difference; 6) Goals scored.
(Note: Head-to-head record is used only if needed to decide teams for promotion or teams for relegation).
(R) Relegated; (Z) Promoted to Second Division B.

=== Group H ===
==== H1 (North) ====
Pos	Team	Pld	W	D	L	GF	GA	GD	Pts	Promotion, qualification or relegation
1	Sinai Star (Z)	20	14	4	2	38	11	+27	46	Qualification for Second Division A/B play-offs
2	MS Arish (Z)	20	13	6	1	45	16	+29	45	Qualification for Second Division B play-off
3	6th of October	20	13	4	3	46	18	+28	43	
4	Al Nasr (Arish)	20	11	6	3	43	20	+23	39	
5	MS El Kherba	20	7	5	8	25	29	−4	26	
6	Abou Sakal	20	6	7	7	27	25	+2	25	
7	MS Martyr Ahmed El Mansi	20	7	3	10	37	33	+4	24	
8	MS Salem El Hersh	20	5	4	11	21	44	−23	19	
9	Bir Al Abd	20	3	8	9	23	41	−18	17	
10	Al Fayrouz	20	4	4	12	28	45	−17	16	
11	MS Masr	20	1	1	18	13	64	−51	4	Qualification for relegation play-off

Source: EFA - North Sinai branch
Rules for classification: 1) Points; 2) Head-to-Head points; 3) Head-to-Head goal difference; 4) Head-to-Head goals scored; 5) Goal difference; 6) Goals scored.
(Note: Head-to-head record is used only if needed to decide teams for promotion or teams for relegation).
(Z) Promoted to Second Division B.

==== H2 (South) ====
Pos	Team	Pld	W	D	L	GF	GA	GD	Pts	Promotion, qualification or relegation
1	South Sinai (O, Z)	8	5	2	1	26	4	+22	17	Qualification for Second Division B play-off
2	MS El Wadi	8	3	4	1	15	9	+6	13	
3	MS El Tour	8	2	3	3	8	16	−8	9	
4	Sharm El Sheikh	8	2	2	4	7	15	−8	8	
5	MS Abou Zenima (O)	8	1	3	4	3	15	−12	6	Qualification for relegation play-off

Source: South Sinai SC
Rules for classification: 1) Points; 2) Head-to-Head points; 3) Head-to-Head goal difference; 4) Head-to-Head goals scored; 5) Goal difference; 6) Goals scored.
(Note: Head-to-head record is used only if needed to decide teams for promotion or teams for relegation).
(O) Play-off winners; (Z) Promoted to Second Division B.

=== Group I ===
Pos	Team	Pld	W	D	L	GF	GA	GD	Pts	Promotion, qualification or relegation
1	Bilqas (Z)	26	17	6	3	44	18	+26	57 (Note: Teams are ranked on head-to-head record.)	Qualification for Second Division A/B play-offs
2	Beni Ebeid (Z)	26	16	9	1	31	12	+19	57	Promotion to Second Division B
3	MS El Kazazin (Z)	26	13	7	6	29	20	+9	46	Promotion to Second Division B
4	Belqas City	26	11	11	4	29	17	+12	44	
5	Damietta	26	11	9	6	32	24	+8	42	
6	Al Zarka	26	10	9	7	29	25	+4	39	
7	Ras El Bar	26	8	8	10	22	21	+1	32	
8	MS Aga	26	8	5	13	22	27	−5	29	
9	Sherbeen	26	7	7	12	29	35	−6	28	
10	MS El Serw	26	6	9	11	25	30	−5	27	
11	Minyat El Nasr	26	6	9	11	24	29	−5	27	
12	Shoban Badaway	26	6	6	14	16	33	−17	24	
13	MS Minyat Samanoud	26	5	6	15	22	39	−17	21	
14	Ghazl Damietta (R)	26	5	5	16	17	41	−24	20	Relegation to Fourth Division

Source: EFA - El Dakahlia branch
Rules for classification: 1) Points; 2) Head-to-Head points; 3) Head-to-Head goal difference; 4) Head-to-Head goals scored; 5) Goal difference; 6) Goals scored.
(Note: Head-to-head record is used only if needed to decide teams for promotion or teams for relegation).
(R) Relegated; (Z) Promoted to Second Division B.

=== Group J ===
Pos	Team	Pld	W	D	L	GF	GA	GD	Pts	Promotion, qualification or relegation
1	Raya Ghazl Kafr El Dawar (O, P)	28	21	5	2	63	19	+44	68	Qualification for Second Division A/B play-offs
2	Ala'ab Damanhour (Z)	28	17	6	5	46	19	+27	57	Promotion to Second Division B
3	MS Koum Hamada (Z)	28	16	3	9	34	17	+17	51	Promotion to Second Division B
4	MS El Delengat	28	14	8	6	36	25	+11	50	
5	MS Abou El Matamir	28	11	9	8	25	20	+5	42	
6	Badr	28	10	8	10	24	29	−5	38	
7	Desouk	28	9	10	9	28	28	0	37	
8	Baltim	28	9	9	10	23	26	−3	36	
9	Sidi Salem	28	9	7	12	32	31	+1	34	
10	BWADC	28	8	10	10	23	30	−7	34	
11	MS Itay El Baroud	28	8	8	12	33	33	0	32	
12	Biyala	28	8	7	13	27	36	−9	31	
13	Sakha	28	5	12	11	29	37	−8	27	
14	El Zaafran (R)	28	4	7	17	29	57	−28	19	Relegation to Fourth Division
15	Koum Hamada (R)	28	3	7	18	9	54	−45	16	Relegation to Fourth Division

Source: EFA - El Beheira branch
Rules for classification: 1) Points; 2) Head-to-Head points; 3) Head-to-Head goal difference; 4) Head-to-Head goals scored; 5) Goal difference; 6) Goals scored.
(Note: Head-to-head record is used only if needed to decide teams for promotion or teams for relegation).
(O) Play-off winners; (P) Promoted to Second Division A; (R) Relegated; (Z) Promoted to Second Division B.

=== Group K ===
Pos	Team	Pld	W	D	L	GF	GA	GD	Pts	Promotion, qualification or relegation
1	Maleyat Kafr El Zayat (Z)	24	14	8	2	39	17	+22	50	Qualification for Second Division A/B play-offs
2	Said El Mahalla (Z)	24	13	7	4	33	18	+15	46	Promotion to Second Division B
3	MS Tala (Z)	24	11	11	2	31	18	+13	44	Promotion to Second Division B
4	Samanoud	24	12	5	7	28	19	+9	41	
5	Othmason Tanta	24	11	6	7	31	25	+6	39	
6	Sers Al Layanah	24	7	8	9	21	24	−3	29	
7	Mit Khalaf	24	6	10	8	24	26	−2	28	
8	Sporting Castle	24	6	9	9	23	30	−7	27	
9	Ashmoun	24	5	9	10	21	25	−4	24	
10	Menouf	24	4	12	8	23	31	−8	24	
11	MS Qutur	24	4	9	11	28	45	−17	21	
12	Quesna (R)	24	4	8	12	12	23	−11	20	Relegation to Fourth Division
13	Ghazl Shebin (R)	24	3	10	11	18	31	−13	19	Relegation to Fourth Division

Source: EFA - El Monufia branch
Rules for classification: 1) Points; 2) Head-to-Head points; 3) Head-to-Head goal difference; 4) Head-to-Head goals scored; 5) Goal difference; 6) Goals scored.
(Note: Head-to-head record is used only if needed to decide teams for promotion or teams for relegation).
(R) Relegated; (Z) Promoted to Second Division B.

=== Group L ===
Pos	Team	Pld	W	D	L	GF	GA	GD	Pts	Promotion, qualification or relegation
1	Delphi (Z)	24	18	5	1	49	14	+35	59	Qualification for Second Division A/B play-offs
2	Fleet Club (Z)	24	13	7	4	34	18	+16	46	Promotion to Second Division B
3	Alexandria Petroleum (Z)	24	11	8	5	34	24	+10	41	Promotion to Second Division B
4	El Zohour	24	10	7	7	35	31	+4	37	
5	El Montaza	24	10	7	7	31	28	+3	37	
6	El Raja	24	10	4	10	38	35	+3	34	
7	MS El Dabaa	24	8	8	8	21	26	−5	32	
8	Horse Owners' Club	24	6	10	8	19	26	−7	28	
9	El Salloum	24	7	4	13	26	29	−3	25	
10	Al Jazeera	24	5	9	10	19	24	−5	24 (Note: Teams are ranked on head-to-head record.)	
11	Matruh	24	5	9	10	23	29	−6	24	
12	MS El Obour (R)	24	5	9	10	23	33	−10	24	Relegation to Fourth Division
13	El Horreya (R)	24	2	5	17	19	54	−35	11	Relegation to Fourth Division

Source: EFA - Alexandria branch
Rules for classification: 1) Points; 2) Head-to-Head points; 3) Head-to-Head goal difference; 4) Head-to-Head goals scored; 5) Goal difference; 6) Goals scored.
(Note: Head-to-head record is used only if needed to decide teams for promotion or teams for relegation).
(R) Relegated; (Z) Promoted to Second Division B.

== Play-offs ==
The draw for the Second Division A/B play-offs was held on 21 March 2023, 12:00 local time (UTC+2), at the Egyptian Football Association headquarters, to decide the order of the fixtures.

The first placed teams from groups A, B, C and D played in Promotion Group A, the winners of groups E, F, G and H1 were put in Promotion Group B, while Promotion Group C consisted of groups I, J, K and L winners.

No draw was held for the Second Division B and relegation play-offs fixtures between teams from groups H1 and H2, as both matches were played at a neutral ground.

=== Second Division A/B play-offs ===
==== Promotion Group A ====
Pos	Team	Pld	W	D	L	GF	GA	GD	Pts	Promotion or qualification
1	Makadi (P)	6	3	3	0	10	4	+6	12	Promotion to Second Division A
2	Qus (Z)	6	3	2	1	11	10	+1	11	Promotion to Second Division B
3	Al Wasta (Z)	6	2	2	2	11	9	+2	8	Promotion to Second Division B
4	MS Maghagha (Z)	6	0	1	5	4	13	−9	1	Promotion to Second Division B

Source: Mr. Mahmoud Salah
Rules for classification: 1) Points; 2) Head-to-Head points; 3) Head-to-Head goal difference; 4) Head-to-Head goals scored; 5) Goal difference; 6) Goals scored.
(P) Promoted to Second Division A; (Z) Promoted to Second Division B.

==== Promotion Group B ====
Pos	Team	Pld	W	D	L	GF	GA	GD	Pts	Promotion or qualification
1	Nogoom (P)	6	4	1	1	13	5	+8	13	Promotion to Second Division A
2	Ittihad El Shorta (Z)	6	3	2	1	8	5	+3	11	Promotion to Second Division B
3	Al Merreikh (Z)	6	2	2	2	4	5	−1	8	Promotion to Second Division B
4	Sinai Star (Z)	6	0	1	5	4	14	−10	1	Promotion to Second Division B

Source: Mr. Mahmoud Salah
Rules for classification: 1) Points; 2) Head-to-Head points; 3) Head-to-Head goal difference; 4) Head-to-Head goals scored; 5) Goal difference; 6) Goals scored.
(P) Promoted to Second Division A; (Z) Promoted to Second Division B.

==== Promotion Group C ====
Pos	Team	Pld	W	D	L	GF	GA	GD	Pts	Promotion or qualification
1	Raya Ghazl Kafr El Dawar (P)	6	4	1	1	13	8	+5	13	Promotion to Second Division A
2	Delphi (Z)	6	4	0	2	12	8	+4	12	Promotion to Second Division B
3	Maleyat Kafr El Zayat (Z)	6	2	1	3	8	9	−1	7	Promotion to Second Division B
4	Bilqas (Z)	6	0	2	4	5	13	−8	2	Promotion to Second Division B

Source: Mr. Mahmoud Salah
Rules for classification: 1) Points; 2) Head-to-Head points; 3) Head-to-Head goal difference; 4) Head-to-Head goals scored; 5) Goal difference; 6) Goals scored.
(P) Promoted to Second Division A; (Z) Promoted to Second Division B.

=== Second Division B play-off ===
19 March 2023
14:30 CAT

MS Arish	0–1	South Sinai
	Report

El Noubi Club Stadium, Ismailia

Both teams promoted to Second Division B. (Note: Originally, per the match result, South Sinai were promoted to Second Division B, and MS Arish remained in Third Division. However, on 9 July 2023, the Egyptian Football Association included MS Arish in the list of participating clubs in the 2023–24 Egyptian Second Division B season without announcing a reason for this decision.)

=== Relegation play-off ===
18 March 2023
14:30 CAT

MS Masr	0–0	MS Abou Zenima
	Report
Penalties
	4–5

El Noubi Club Stadium, Ismailia

Both teams remained in Third Division. (Note: Originally, per the match result, MS Abou Zenima remained in Third Division, and MS Masr were relegated to Fourth Division. However, on 7 September 2023, the Egyptian Football Association included MS Masr in the list of participating clubs in the 2023–24 Egyptian Third Division season without announcing a reason for this decision.)
