= 2021–22 Egyptian Second Division =

Egyptian Second Division
- Season: 2021–22
- Dates: 30 September 2021 – 4 June 2022
- Promoted: Group A: Aswan; Group B: El Dakhleya; Group C: Haras El Hodoud
- Relegated: Group A: Beni Suef Sohag Qena Al Badari; Group B: Al Merreikh Port Fouad Belbeis Benha; Group C: Ala'ab Damanhour Al Zarka Said El Mahalla El Raja
- Matches: 720
- Goals: 1,644 (2.28 per match)
- Top goalscorer: Rafik Kabou (18 goals)

The 2021–22 Egyptian Second Division was the 42nd edition of the Egyptian Second Division, the top Egyptian semi-professional level for football clubs, since its establishment in 1977. The season started on 30 September 2021 and concluded on 4 June 2022. Fixtures for the 2021–22 season were announced on 12 September 2021.

Aswan, El Dakhleya and Haras El Hodoud won Group A, Group B and Group C respectively and secured the promotion to the 2022–23 Egyptian Premier League.

== Format ==
The league consists of 48 teams divided into 3 groups of 16 teams each, with each group covering different parts of Egypt:

- Group A for teams from Upper Egypt and eastern governorates.
- Group B for teams from Greater Cairo, and central and north-eastern governorates.
- Group C for teams from Alexandria and northern governorates.

The top team from each group earns promotion to the next season of the Egyptian Premier League, while the bottom 4 teams from each group get relegated to the Egyptian Third Division.

== Teams ==
- Team name followed with ^{↓} indicates the team was relegated from the 2020–21 Egyptian Premier League.
- Team name followed with ^{↑} indicates the team was promoted from the 2020–21 Egyptian Third Division.

Group A

- Al Aluminium
- Aswan^{↓}
- Asyut Petroleum
- Al Badari^{↑}
- Beni Suef
- Dayrout
- Faiyum
- KIMA Aswan
- Al Madina Al Monawara^{↑}
- Mallawi^{↑}
- Media
- El Minya
- MS Tamya^{↑}
- Qena
- Sohag
- Telephonat Beni Suef

Group B

- Belbeis^{↑}
- Benha^{↑}
- El Dakhleya
- El Entag El Harby^{↓}
- Al Merreikh
- Al Nasr
- Petrojet
- Port Fouad^{↑}
- Porto Suez
- El Qanah
- El Sekka El Hadid
- Suez
- Telecom Egypt^{↑}
- Tersana
- Wadi Degla^{↓}
- ZED

Group C

- Abou Qir Fertilizers
- Ala'ab Damanhour
- Baladeyet El Mahalla
- Dikernis
- Al Hammam
- Haras El Hodoud
- Kafr El Sheikh
- El Magd^{↑}
- El Mansoura
- Al Masry (Al Saloum)^{↑}
- Olympic Club
- Pioneers^{↑}
- El Raja
- Said El Mahalla^{↑}
- Sporting Alexandria
- Al Zarka

== Results ==
=== Group A ===
Pos	Team	Pld	W	D	L	GF	GA	GD	Pts	Promotion, qualification or relegation
1	Aswan (P)	30	21	7	2	54	23	+31	70	Promotion to the Premier League
2	Al Aluminium	30	14	12	4	53	27	+26	54	
3	KIMA Aswan	30	14	11	5	42	27	+15	53	
4	Asyut Petroleum	30	14	10	6	45	22	+23	52	
5	El Minya	30	12	13	5	43	28	+15	49	
6	Telephonat Beni Suef	30	12	8	10	34	32	+2	44	
7	MS Tamya	30	10	8	12	40	38	+2	38	
8	Al Madina Al Monawara	30	9	10	11	36	35	+1	37 (Note: Head-to-head points: Al Madina Al Monawara 8, Faiyum 3, Media 3. Head-to-head goal difference: Faiyum +1, Media –3.)	
9	Faiyum	30	9	10	11	28	34	−6	37	
10	Media	30	8	13	9	25	28	−3	37	
11	Mallawi	30	8	11	11	32	38	−6	35 (Note: Head-to-head points: Mallawi 4, Dayrout 1.)	
12	Dayrout	30	9	8	13	25	37	−12	35	
13	Beni Suef (R)	30	7	12	11	33	39	−6	33 (Note: Head-to-head points: Beni Suef 4, Sohag 1.)	Relegation to the Third Division
14	Sohag (R)	30	7	12	11	30	38	−8	33	Relegation to the Third Division
15	Qena (R)	30	3	8	19	30	65	−35	17	Relegation to the Third Division
16	Al Badari (R)	30	3	7	20	18	57	−39	16	Relegation to the Third Division

Source: Soccerway
Rules for classification: 1) Points; 2) Head-to-Head points; 3) Head-to-Head goal difference; 4) Head-to-Head goals scored; 5) Head-to-Head away goals scored; 6) Goal difference; 7) Goals scored; 8) Draw of lots (only if needed to decide teams for promotion or teams for relegation).
(Note: Head-to-head record is used only after all the matches between the teams in question have been played).
(P) Promoted; (R) Relegated

=== Group B ===
Pos	Team	Pld	W	D	L	GF	GA	GD	Pts	Promotion, qualification or relegation
1	El Dakhleya (P)	30	22	3	5	48	25	+23	69	Promotion to the Premier League
2	Petrojet	30	15	11	4	42	26	+16	56	
3	Wadi Degla	30	13	9	8	46	36	+10	48	
4	ZED	30	12	11	7	28	22	+6	47	
5	El Qanah	30	11	13	6	29	21	+8	46	
6	Tersana	30	12	9	9	43	36	+7	45 (Note: Tied on head-to-head points (3). Head-to-head goal difference: Tersana +1, Porso Suez –1.)	
7	Porto Suez	30	12	9	9	49	48	+1	45	
8	El Sekka El Hadid	30	11	11	8	33	31	+2	44	
9	Telecom Egypt	30	10	12	8	33	24	+9	42	
10	El Entag El Harby	30	9	13	8	34	32	+2	40	
11	Suez	30	9	12	9	24	27	−3	39	
12	Al Nasr	30	9	10	11	33	36	−3	37	
13	Al Merreikh (R)	30	5	11	14	25	36	−11	26	Relegation to the Third Division
14	Port Fouad (R)	30	4	11	15	26	45	−19	23	Relegation to the Third Division
15	Belbeis (R)	30	4	9	17	26	43	−17	21	Relegation to the Third Division
16	Benha (R)	30	1	8	21	15	46	−31	11	Relegation to the Third Division

Source: Soccerway
Rules for classification: 1) Points; 2) Head-to-Head points; 3) Head-to-Head goal difference; 4) Head-to-Head goals scored; 5) Head-to-Head away goals scored; 6) Goal difference; 7) Goals scored; 8) Draw of lots (only if needed to decide teams for promotion or teams for relegation).
(Note: Head-to-head record is used only after all the matches between the teams in question have been played).
(P) Promoted; (R) Relegated

=== Group C ===
Pos	Team	Pld	W	D	L	GF	GA	GD	Pts	Promotion, qualification or relegation
1	Haras El Hodoud (P)	30	16	12	2	43	15	+28	60	Promotion to the Premier League
2	Dikernis	30	14	14	2	41	20	+21	56	
3	Olympic Club	30	15	9	6	44	31	+13	54	
4	Abou Qir Fertilizers	30	13	12	5	46	28	+18	51 (Note: Head-to-head points: Abou Qir Fertilizers 6, Baladeyet El Mahalla 0.)	
5	Baladeyet El Mahalla	30	15	6	9	39	24	+15	51	
6	El Magd	30	12	11	7	32	21	+11	47	
7	Kafr El Sheikh	30	11	12	7	36	25	+11	45	
8	Sporting Alexandria	30	10	13	7	42	29	+13	43 (Note: Head-to-head points: Sporting Alexandria 4, Al Masry (Al Saloum) 1.)	
9	Al Masry (Al Saloum)	30	11	10	9	37	22	+15	43	
10	Pioneers	30	9	13	8	37	31	+6	40	
11	El Mansoura	30	10	9	11	27	29	−2	39	
12	Al Hammam	30	7	14	9	31	31	0	35	
13	Ala'ab Damanhour (R)	30	5	13	12	29	38	−9	28	Relegation to the Third Division
14	Al Zarka (R)	30	5	7	18	25	49	−24	22	Relegation to the Third Division
15	Said El Mahalla (R)	30	3	8	19	27	53	−26	17	Relegation to the Third Division
16	El Raja (R)	30	0	5	25	6	96	−90	5	Relegation to the Third Division

Source: Soccerway
Rules for classification: 1) Points; 2) Head-to-Head points; 3) Head-to-Head goal difference; 4) Head-to-Head goals scored; 5) Head-to-Head away goals scored; 6) Goal difference; 7) Goals scored; 8) Draw of lots (only if needed to decide teams for promotion or teams for relegation).
(Note: Head-to-head record is used only after all the matches between the teams in question have been played).
(P) Promoted; (R) Relegated

== Number of teams by governorate ==
Number of teams	Governorate	Team(s)
7	Cairo	El Dakhleya, El Entag El Harby, Al Nasr, El Sekka El Hadid, Telecom Egypt, Wadi Degla and ZED
5	Alexandria	Abou Qir Fertilizers, Haras El Hodoud, El Magd, Olympic Club and Sporting Alexandria
3	Asyut	Asyut Petroleum, Al Badari and Dayrout
3	El Dakahlia	Dikernis, El Mansoura and Pioneers
3	Matruh	Al Hammam, Al Masry (Al Saloum) and El Raja
3	Suez	Petrojet, Porto Suez and Suez
2	Aswan	Aswan and KIMA Aswan
2	Beni Suef	Beni Suef and Telephonat Beni Suef
2	Faiyum	Faiyum and MS Tamya
2	El Gharbia	Baladeyet El Mahalla and Said El Mahalla
2	Giza	Media and Tersana
2	El Minya	Mallawi and El Minya
2	Port Said	Al Merreikh and Port Fouad
2	Qena	Al Aluminium and Qena
1	El Beheira	Ala'ab Damanhour
1	Damietta	Al Zarka
1	Ismailia	El Qanah
1	Kafr El Sheikh	Kafr El Sheikh
1	Luxor	Al Madina Al Monawara
1	El Qalyubia	Benha
1	El Sharkia	Belbeis
1	Sohag	Sohag
