= 2023–24 Egyptian Second Division B =

Egyptian Second Division B
- Season: 2023–24
- Dates: 11 October 2023 – 13 May 2024
- Promoted: Dayrout; Tersana; Suez; Kahraba Ismailia; El Mansoura; Sporting Alexandria
- Relegated: Mallawi; MS Maghagha; MS Arish; Porto Suez; Bilqas; Alexandria Petroleum
- Matches: 468
- Goals: 1,031 (2.2 per match)
- Biggest home win: Sinai Star 7–0 MS Arish (15 February 2024); Alo Egypt 7–0 Porto Suez (25 April 2024)
- Biggest away win: MS Arish 0–8 El Shams (18 April 2024)
- Highest scoring: Qus 2–6 Muslim Youths (Qena) (20 October 2023); Kahraba Ismailia 5–3 Misr Insurance (26 October 2023); Ittihad Nabarouh 4–4 Maleyat Kafr El Zayat (7 February 2024); MS Arish 0–8 El Shams (18 April 2024)
- (Note: All statistics do not include play-offs round)

The 2023–24 Egyptian Second Division B season was the inaugural edition of the Egyptian Second Division B, the new third level in the Egyptian football league system. It took place of the Egyptian Third Division, which became level four, and succeeded the old Egyptian Second Division, which was abolished and replaced with the new Second Division A and Second Division B leagues, with the latter retaining the format used by the abolished league. Fixtures for the 2023–24 season were announced on 14 September 2023.

The season started on 11 October 2023, and concluded on 13 May 2024.

== Format ==
The league consist of 56 teams divided into six groups; four groups of 9 teams, and two groups of 10 teams, with each group covering different parts of Egypt:

- Group A and B for teams from Upper Egypt and eastern governorates.
- Group C and D for teams from Greater Cairo, and central and north-eastern governorates.
- Group E and F for teams from Alexandria and northern governorates.

The final format was confirmed by Egyptian Football Association board member Ehab El Komy on 8 August 2023, after changes were made to the initial format announced on 19 June 2023.

All group winners secure promotion to Second Division A, and advance to a play-off round to decide the three teams participating in the Premier League promotion play-off round from the league, alongside the third-placed team in Second Division A. This means that a chance is given for Second Division B sides to earn promotion directly to the Premier League without playing in Second Division A.

The last-placed in each group face relegation to Third Division, for a total of six teams.

== Teams ==
- Team name followed with ^{↓} indicates the team was relegated from the 2022–23 Egyptian Second Division.
- Team name followed with ^{↑} indicates the team was promoted from the 2022–23 Egyptian Third Division.

Group	Group A	Group B	Group C	Group D	Group E	Group F
Teams	Al Aluminium^{↓}; Asyut Cement^{↓}; Dayrout^{↓}; KIMA Aswan^{↓}; Luxor^{↑}; Mallawi^{↓}; Muslim Youths (Qena)^{↓}; Qus^{↑}; Tahta^{↑}	Beni Mazar^{↑}; Egypt Stars^{↑}; Faiyum^{↓}; MS Maghagha^{↑}; MS Tamya^{↓}; El Minya^{↓}; Telephonat Beni Suef^{↓}; Tersana^{↓}; Al Wasta^{↑}	MS Arish^{↑}; Al Merreikh^{↑}; Al Mostaqbal^{↓}; Al Nasr^{↓}; Al Obour^{↓}; El Shams^{↑}; Sinai Star^{↑}; South Sinai^{↑}; Suez^{↓}	Alo Egypt^{↑}; Eastern Company^{↓}; El Entag El Harby^{↓}; Ittihad El Shorta^{↑}; Kahraba Ismailia^{↓}; Misr Insurance^{↑}; Port Fouad^{↑}; Porto Suez^{↓}; Team FC^{↑}	Beni Ebeid^{↑}; Bilqas^{↑}; Ittihad Nabarouh^{↓}; Kafr El Sheikh^{↓}; MS El Kazazin^{↑}; MS Tala^{↑}; Maleyat Kafr El Zayat^{↑}; El Mansoura^{↓}; Pioneers^{↓}; Said El Mahalla^{↑}	Ala'ab Damanhour^{↑}; Alexandria Petroleum^{↑}; Delphi^{↑}; Fleet Club^{↑}; Al Hammam^{↓}; Al Hilal (El Dabaa)^{↓}; Al Magd^{↓}; MS Koum Hamada^{↑}; Olympic Club^{↓}; Sporting Alexandria^{↓}

== League tables ==
=== Group A ===
Pos	Team	Pld	W	D	L	GF	GA	GD	Pts	Qualification or relegation
1	Dayrout (P)	16	10	5	1	27	11	+16	35 (Note: Head-to-head points: Dayrout 4, Al Aluminium 1.)	Qualification for promotion play-offs
2	Al Aluminium	16	10	5	1	24	12	+12	35	
3	Asyut Cement	16	7	6	3	31	16	+15	27	
4	Tahta	16	8	1	7	18	13	+5	25	
5	KIMA Aswan	16	5	5	6	17	22	−5	20	
6	Luxor	16	4	6	6	16	22	−6	18	
7	Muslim Youths (Qena)	16	4	5	7	17	26	−9	17	
8	Qus	16	3	2	11	13	29	−16	11	
9	Mallawi (R)	16	1	5	10	10	22	−12	8	Relegation to Third Division

Source: Kooora
Rules for classification: 1) Points; 2) Head-to-head points; 3) Head-to-head goal difference; 4) Goal difference; 5) Goals scored; 6) Play-off tie.
(P) Promoted; (R) Relegated

=== Group B ===
Pos	Team	Pld	W	D	L	GF	GA	GD	Pts	Qualification or relegation
1	Tersana (O, P)	16	13	3	0	35	5	+30	42	Qualification for promotion play-offs
2	Faiyum	16	6	9	1	16	10	+6	27	
3	El Minya	16	6	6	4	19	16	+3	24	
4	Egypt Stars	16	6	3	7	20	13	+7	21	
5	Telephonat Beni Suef	16	6	1	9	18	25	−7	19	
6	Al Wasta	16	3	7	6	17	22	−5	16 (Note: Tied on head-to-head points (3). Head-to-head goal difference: Al Wasta +1, MS Tamya −1.)	
7	MS Tamya	16	4	4	8	15	31	−16	16	
8	Beni Mazar	16	3	5	8	18	27	−9	14 (Note: Head-to-head points: Beni Mazar 4, MS Maghagha 1.)	
9	MS Maghagha (R)	16	2	8	6	13	22	−9	14	Relegation to Third Division

Source: Kooora
Rules for classification: 1) Points; 2) Head-to-head points; 3) Head-to-head goal difference; 4) Goal difference; 5) Goals scored; 6) Play-off tie.
(O) Play-off winners; (P) Promoted; (R) Relegated

=== Group C ===
Pos	Team	Pld	W	D	L	GF	GA	GD	Pts	Qualification or relegation
1	Suez (O, P)	16	9	6	1	25	9	+16	33	Qualification for promotion play-offs
2	Al Obour	16	8	8	0	24	15	+9	32	
3	Al Nasr	16	7	8	1	28	13	+15	29	
4	El Shams	16	8	2	6	29	16	+13	26 (Note: Tied on head-to-head points (3) and on head-to-head goal difference (0). Overall goal difference: El Shams +13, Al Merreikh +11.)	
5	Al Merreikh	16	7	5	4	27	16	+11	26	
6	Al Mostaqbal	16	6	5	5	18	18	0	23	
7	South Sinai	16	4	4	8	18	29	−11	16	
8	Sinai Star	16	3	2	11	19	31	−12	11	
9	MS Arish (R)	16	0	0	16	4	45	−41	0	Relegation to Third Division

Source: Kooora
Rules for classification: 1) Points; 2) Head-to-head points; 3) Head-to-head goal difference; 4) Goal difference; 5) Goals scored; 6) Play-off tie.
(O) Play-off winners; (P) Promoted; (R) Relegated

=== Group D ===
Pos	Team	Pld	W	D	L	GF	GA	GD	Pts	Qualification or relegation
1	Kahraba Ismailia (P)	16	9	6	1	20	10	+10	33	Qualification for promotion play-offs
2	Team FC	16	8	6	2	17	8	+9	30 (Note: Head-to-head points: Team FC 4, El Entag El Harby 1.)	
3	El Entag El Harby	16	8	6	2	25	12	+13	30	
4	Port Fouad	16	6	5	5	17	16	+1	23	
5	Misr Insurance	16	4	6	6	14	19	−5	18	
6	Alo Egypt	16	3	8	5	15	11	+4	17	
7	Ittihad El Shorta	16	2	9	5	11	12	−1	15	
8	Eastern Company	16	3	5	8	13	18	−5	14	
9	Porto Suez (R)	16	3	1	12	9	35	−26	10	Relegation to Third Division

Source: Kooora
Rules for classification: 1) Points; 2) Head-to-head points; 3) Head-to-head goal difference; 4) Goal difference; 5) Goals scored; 6) Play-off tie.
(P) Promoted; (R) Relegated

=== Group E ===
Pos	Team	Pld	W	D	L	GF	GA	GD	Pts	Qualification or relegation
1	El Mansoura (P)	18	9	9	0	20	5	+15	36 (Note: Tied on head-to-head points (2) and on head-to-head goal difference (0). Overall goal difference: El Mansoura +15, MS El Kazazin +13.)	Qualification for promotion play-offs
2	MS El Kazazin	18	10	6	2	21	8	+13	36	
3	Maleyat Kafr El Zayat	18	8	8	2	24	16	+8	32	
4	Pioneers	18	6	10	2	19	13	+6	28 (Note: Tied on head-to-head points (2) and on head-to-head goal difference (0). Overall goal difference: Pioneers +6, Ittihad Nabarouh +3.)	
5	Ittihad Nabarouh	18	7	7	4	19	16	+3	28	
6	Said El Mahalla	18	5	6	7	17	18	−1	21	
7	Kafr El Sheikh	18	5	4	9	18	22	−4	19	
8	Beni Ebeid	18	4	6	8	13	19	−6	18	
9	MS Tala	18	3	2	13	12	32	−20	11	
10	Bilqas (R)	18	2	4	12	7	21	−14	10	Relegation to Third Division

Source: Kooora
Rules for classification: 1) Points; 2) Head-to-head points; 3) Head-to-head goal difference; 4) Goal difference; 5) Goals scored; 6) Play-off tie.
(P) Promoted; (R) Relegated

=== Group F ===
Pos	Team	Pld	W	D	L	GF	GA	GD	Pts	Qualification or relegation
1	Sporting Alexandria (O, P)	18	10	5	3	28	18	+10	35	Qualification for promotion play-offs
2	Olympic Club	18	8	6	4	19	14	+5	30	
3	Al Hilal (El Dabaa)	18	8	5	5	17	12	+5	29	
4	Al Hammam	18	8	4	6	24	25	−1	28	
5	Fleet Club	18	7	3	8	21	22	−1	24	
6	Delphi	18	5	8	5	19	18	+1	23 (Note: Head-to-head points: Delphi 4, Ala'ab Damanhour 1.)	
7	Ala'ab Damanhour	18	6	5	7	15	17	−2	23	
8	Al Magd	18	5	7	6	10	10	0	22	
9	MS Koum Hamada	18	5	3	10	18	24	−6	18	
10	Alexandria Petroleum (R)	18	2	6	10	13	24	−11	12	Relegation to Third Division

Source: Kooora
Rules for classification: 1) Points; 2) Head-to-head points; 3) Head-to-head goal difference; 4) Goal difference; 5) Goals scored; 6) Play-off tie.
(O) Play-off winners; (P) Promoted; (R) Relegated

=== Play-offs ===
All six teams who reached the play-offs were at least assured of a place in Second Division A.

The two group winners from each three regions played each other, which means that the match-ups was the winner of Group A vs B, C vs D, and E vs F. The three winning teams from this round advanced to the Premier League promotion play-offs, alongside the third-placed team from Second Division A, for a chance to earn direct promotion to the Premier League.

==== Matches ====
Team 1	Score	Team 2
Dayrout	1–1 (3–4 p)	Tersana
Suez	1–0	Kahraba Ismailia
El Mansoura	0–0 (3–4 p)	Sporting Alexandria

==== Details ====
All times are CAST (UTC+3).

13 May 2024
16:30

Dayrout	1–1	Tersana
Farouk 43'	Report	Mosaad 60'
Penalties
El Zeiny (penalty missed); Selim (penalty missed); Mohamed (penalty scored); M. Essam (penalty scored); Farouk (penalty scored)	3–4	(penalty missed) Aref; (penalty scored) Otu; (penalty scored) I. Essam; (penalty scored) Mosaad; (penalty scored) Shalata

Khaled Bichara Stadium, El Gouna
Referee: Mahmoud Bassiouny

Tersana advanced to Premier League play-offs, Dayrout promoted to Second Division A.

12 May 2024
16:30

Suez	1–0	Kahraba Ismailia
Shika 2'	Report

Petrosport Stadium, Cairo
Referee: Mahmoud Nagy

Suez advanced to Premier League play-offs, Kahraba Ismailia promoted to Second Division A.

11 May 2024
15:00

El Mansoura	0–0	Sporting Alexandria
	Report
Penalties
Harisa (penalty scored); Afroto (penalty missed); Bebo (penalty scored); Raslan (penalty missed); Gaballah (penalty scored)	3–4	(penalty missed) Mahmoud; (penalty scored) Hamdeen; (penalty scored) Khamis; (penalty scored) Shesh; (penalty scored) Abdel Halim

Petrosport Stadium, Cairo
Referee: Ahmed El Ghandour

Sporting Alexandria advanced to Premier League play-offs, El Mansoura promoted to Second Division A.
