= Moataz Mahrous =

Egyptian footballer (born 1984)

Personal information
- Date of birth: November 15, 1984 (age 41)
- Place of birth: Beni Suef, Egypt
- Position: Central midfielder

Team information
- Current team: Alassiouty Sport

Senior career*
Years	Team	Apps	(Gls)
–2007	Telephonat Beni Suef		
2007–2011	Telecom Egypt		
2011–2013	El Gouna		
2013–2015	Ghazl El Mahalla		
2015–2016	Beni Suef		
2016–	Alassiouty Sport		
- * Club domestic league appearances and goals as of 27 September 2017

Moataz Mahrous (Arabic: معتز محروس; born November 15, 1984) is an Egyptian professional footballer who plays as a central midfielder for the Egyptian club Alassiouty Sport. In May 2017, Mahrous suffered from a cruciate ligament injury during their match against Sohag, he was the top goal scorer in Group A in 2016–17 Egyptian Second Division then.
