= Nogoom FC =

Egyptian football club

- Full name: Nogoom Football Club
- Nickname(s): Future players (لعيبة المستقبل)
- Short name: NFC
- Founded: 29 December 2006; 18 years ago
- Ground: Nogoom Stadium, October, Giza, Egypt
- Capacity: 2,000
- Chairman: (Egypt) Mohamed El Tawila
- League: Egyptian Third Division
- 2019–20: Egyptian Second Division, 8th
Home colours	Away colours

Nogoom Football Club (Arabic: نادي النجوم لكرة القدم, formerly Nogoom El Mostakbal Football Club (Arabic: نادي نجوم المستقبل لكرة القدم, is an Egyptian football club based in October, Giza, Egypt. The club currently plays in the Egyptian Third Division, the third-highest league in the Egyptian football league system.

== History ==
After the success of the Pepsi League for students of schools led by Egyptian businessman Mohamed El Tawila since its establishment in 2003, El Tawila thought of creating Nogoom El Mostakbal club to provide young talent with the opportunity to develop and compete in a football trip in 2006.

Nogoom El Mostakbal club has become one of the leading youth development clubs in Egypt and continues to bring new talents to Egyptian football.

The first official participation of Nogoom El Mostakbal in the Egyptian Championships was the 2007–08 season in the Giza Area U-18 Championship and won the championship, and Participate in the Giza Area U-15 Championship.

The club rebranded as Nogoom FC in July 2018. The "of the Future" part of the name was removed as the club has reached the Egyptian Premier League.

== Performance in the Egyptian Premier League ==
Division	Season	G	W	D	L	GF	GA	GD	Pts	Position	Group	Notes
Egyptian Fourth Division	2008–09	0	0	0	0	0	0	0	0		Giza Area	
Egyptian Fourth Division	2009–10	0	0	0	0	0	0	0	0	1st	Giza Area	↑
Egyptian Third Division	2010–11	32	10	7	15	59	64	-5	37	12th	Giza Area	
Egyptian Third Division	2011–12	13	0	0	0	0	0	0	34	1st	Giza Area	Cancelled
Egyptian Third Division	2012–13	30	21	5	4	69	24	45	68	2nd	Giza Area	↑
Egyptian Second Division	2013–14	26	10	8	8	31	27	4	38	5th	Group C	
Egyptian Second Division	2014–15	24	8	11	5	30	24	6	35	6th	Group C	
Egyptian Second Division	2015–16	20	9	5	6	27	21	6	32	4th	Group C	
Egyptian Second Division	2016–17	36	12	11	13	47	48	-1	47	8th	Group B	
Egyptian Second Division	2017–18	28	17	8	3	32	16	16	59	1st	Group B	↑
Egyptian Premier League	2018–19	34	5	11	18	30	46	−16	26	18th		↓
Egyptian Second Division	2019–20	22	6	7	9	25	24	1	25	8th	Group B	
Egyptian Second Division	2020–21	30	7	10	13	23	31	-8	31	15th	Group B	↓

== Current squad ==
=== First Team Squad ===
As of 5 April 2018

Note: Flags indicate national team as defined under FIFA eligibility rules; some limited exceptions apply. Players may hold more than one non-FIFA nationality.

No.	Pos.	Nation	Player
1	GK	(Egypt) EGY	Essam El Hadary
3	DF	(Egypt) EGY	Hassan Gomaa
4	DF	(Egypt) EGY	Hossam Abdel Gawad
5	DF	(Egypt) EGY	Ahmed Rabea
6	DF	(Egypt) EGY	Ahmed Salah "El-Agooz"
7	MF	(Egypt) EGY	Ahmed Saed
8	MF	(Egypt) EGY	Amr Emad "El-Sisi"
9	FW	(Egypt) EGY	Mohamed Ebrahim "Crespo"
10	FW	(Egypt) EGY	Mohamed Fawzi
11	MF	(Egypt) EGY	Mostafa Gamel
12	DF	(Egypt) EGY	Mohamed Ali
13	MF	(Egypt) EGY	Girges Magdy
14	MF	(Egypt) EGY	Mohamed El-Faiomy

No.	Pos.	Nation	Player
15	DF	(Egypt) EGY	Ahmed Ayman
17	MF	(Egypt) EGY	Mahmoud Abdel Halim "Halimo"
18	FW	(Egypt) EGY	Walid Fisal
19	FW	(Egypt) EGY	Ahmed Ata
20	MF	(Egypt) EGY	Sameh Hassan
21	MF	(Egypt) EGY	Nader El-Tawila
23	GK	(Egypt) EGY	Sayed Emad
24	MF	(Egypt) EGY	Islam Hazem
25	GK	(Egypt) EGY	Ahmed Abdel Monem "Khatab"
27	MF	(Egypt) EGY	Mohamed Hammam
29	FW	(Egypt) EGY	Ahmed Hagag
32	DF	(Egypt) EGY	Mahmoud Amr "Mangawy"
33	MF	(Egypt) EGY	Mohab Yasser
64	FW	(Egypt) EGY	Vusal Isgandarov

=== On Loan ===
Note: Flags indicate national team as defined under FIFA eligibility rules; some limited exceptions apply. Players may hold more than one non-FIFA nationality.

No.	Pos.	Nation	Player
—	DF	(Egypt) EGY	Ahmed Gamal (at Alassiouty Sport until 30 June 2018)
—	MF	(Egypt) EGY	Eslam El-Far (at Tanta SC until 30 June 2018)

No.	Pos.	Nation	Player
—	FW	(Egypt) EGY	Ayman Elghobashy (at Gibraltar United F.C. until 30 June 2018)

== Current technical staff ==
Position	Name
Manager	(Egypt) Abdel Naser Mohamed
Assistant manager	(Egypt) Moustafa Askar
First-team coaches	(Egypt) Ahmed El-Dezwy
Fitness coach	(Egypt) Ahmed El-Mohamady
Goalkeeping coach	(Egypt) Wesam Ismail
Director of Players Affairs	(Egypt) Karim Hasan Shehata
Administrative	(Egypt) Maher El-Yamani
Administrative	(Egypt) Sayed Emam
Doctor	(Egypt) Mahmoud Ouqab
Massage Specialist	(Egypt) ِAbdel Monem Ishak
