= MS Minyat Samanoud =

Egyptian football club

Samanoud
- Full name: Samanoud نادي سمنود
- Nickname: نادي سمنود الرياضي
- Short name: SM
- Ground: Samanoud Stadium
- Capacity: Samanoud
- Chairman: Hossam Ghoneima
- Manager: Khaled El Emam
- League: Egyptian Third Division
- 2016–17: Third Division, 1st (Group H) (Promoted)

Samanoud Club (Arabic: نادي سمنود الرياضي), also known as Samanoud Club, or simply Samanoud , is an Egyptian football club based in Samanoud, Egypt. The club currently plays in the Egyptian Third Division, the third-highest league in the Egyptian football league system.
