= Abu Qirqas =

Abu Qirqas ⲁⲡⲟⲕⲟⲣⲕⲁⲥ ابو قرقاص
- Town
- Location in Egypt
- Coordinates: 27°56′N 30°49′E
- Country: Egypt
- Governorate: Minya

Area
  - Total: 9.88 km^{2} (3.81 sq mi)
- Elevation: 54 m (177 ft)

Population (2023)
  - Total: 94,855
  - Density: 9,600/km^{2} (24,900/sq mi)
- Time zone: UTC+2 (EET)
  - Summer (DST): UTC+3 (EEST)

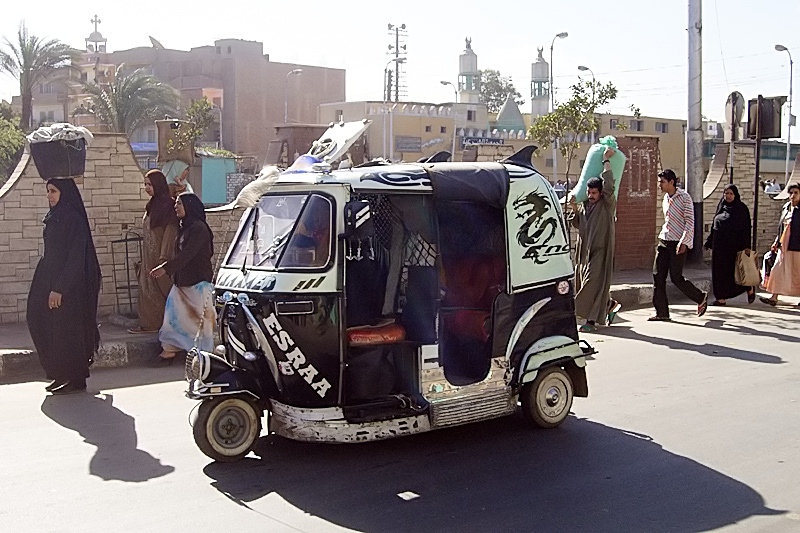

Abu Qirqas or Abu Qurqas is a town and subdivision (markaz) in Minya Governorate, Egypt. It is situated on the west bank of the Nile, opposite of the historic site of Beni Hasan.

The population of Abu Qirqas is around 94,855 inhabitants. The city has an important sugar factory.

== Name ==
The name is spelled in Arabic: ابو قرقاص. The Coptic: ⲁⲡⲟⲕⲟⲣⲕⲁⲥ Late Coptic [ɑpoˈkorkɑs], probably from ⲁⲡⲁ ⲅⲉⲱⲣⲅⲓⲟⲥ apa georgios Late Coptic [ˈɑpɑ ɡæˈ(w)oːrɡi(j)os].

== Coptic Catholic Eparchy ==
On 7 January 2020 an Eparchy (Eastern Catholic Diocese) of Abu Qurqas was established on territory split off from the Minya. Its episcopal see is Cathédrale Saint-Antoine et Saint-Paul.

Suffragan Eparchs (Bishops of Abu Qurqas)

- Bechara Giuda Matarana, O.F.M. (7 January 2020 – present)
