= Faqous SC =

Egyptian football club

Faqous
- Full name: Faqous Sporting Club
- Ground: Faqous Stadium, Faqous, Egypt
- Capacity: 10,000
- League: Egyptian Third Division
- 2015–16: (Group 4)

Faqous Sporting Club (نادي فاقوس الرياضي) is an Egyptian association football club from the city of Faqous. They are playing in the Egyptian Third Division.

== Colours ==
Faqous's colours are white and blue. Faqous's home kit is a white shirt with blue shorts. The team's away kit is a blue shirt with white shorts.

Home
Away
