= El Horreya SC =

Egyptian football club

- Full name: El Horreya Sporting Club نادي الحرية للألعاب الرياضية
- Short name: HOR
- Ground: MS Matruh Stadium
- Chairman: Ibrahim Abou Sondouq
- Manager: Abou El Einein Shehata
- League: Egyptian Third Division

El Horreya Sporting Club (Arabic: نادي الحرية للألعاب الرياضية), is an Egyptian football club based in Mersa Matruh. The club is currently playing in the Egyptian Third Division, the third-highest league in the Egyptian football league system.
