= Badr SC =

Egyptian football club

- Full name: Badr Sporting Club نادي بدر للألعاب الرياضية
- Short name: BAD
- Ground: Badr Stadium
- Chairman: Tarek Zain
- Manager: Yehia Abdel Fatah; Hashim El Gizawy (caretakers)
- League: Egyptian Third Division
- 2015–16: Second Division, 5th (Group F)

Badr Sporting Club (Arabic: نادي بدر للألعاب الرياضية), is an Egyptian football club based in Wadi El Natrun, Egypt. The club was playing in the Egyptian Third Division, the third-highest league in the Egyptian football league system. As of 2026 the club is playing in Second Division Group B.
