= Naser El Fekreia SC =

Egyptian football club

- Full name: Naser El Fekreia Sporting Club نادي ناصر الفكرية للألعاب الرياضية
- Short name: NFK
- Ground: Naser El Fekreia Stadium
- Chairman: Gamal Abdel Rahman
- Manager: Mohsen Kotb
- League: Egyptian Third Division
- 2015–16: Third Division, 1st (Group C)

Naser El Fekreia Sporting Club (Arabic: نادي ناصر الفكرية للألعاب الرياضية), is an Egyptian football club based in Abu Qirqas, Egypt. The club is currently playing in the Egyptian Third Division, the third-highest league in the Egyptian football league system.
