= Kahrabaa Ismailia SC =

Association football club in Egypt

Kahrabaa Ismailia SC (Ismailia Electricity Club)
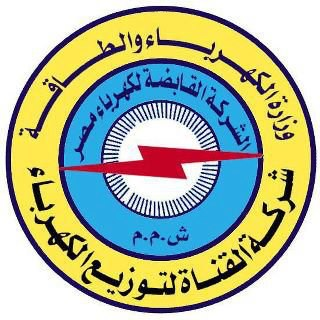
- Full name: Kahrabaa Ismailia Sporting Club نادي كهرباء الإسماعيلية للألعاب الرياضية
- Short name: KIS (or IEC)
- Founded: 1935; 91 years ago
- Ground: Kahrabaa Ismailia Stadium
- Capacity: 6,000
- Manager: Reda Shehata
- League: Egyptian Second Division A
- 2025–26: Egyptian Premier League, 18th of 21 (relegated)
Home colours	Away colours

Kahrabaa Ismailia Sporting Club (Arabic: نادي كهرباء الإسماعيلية للألعاب الرياضية), is an Egyptian football club based in Ismailia, Egypt. The club currently plays in the Egyptian Second Division A, the second highest tier of the Egyptian football league system.

== History ==
Kahrabaa Ismailia were relegated to the Egyptian Third Division in 2018. After earning promotion to the Egyptian Second Division in 2022, the club secured their first-ever promotion to the Egyptian Premier League in 2025–26.

== Current squad ==
As of 8 April, 2026

Note: Flags indicate national team as defined under FIFA eligibility rules; some limited exceptions apply. Players may hold more than one non-FIFA nationality.

No.	Pos.	Nation	Player
2	DF	EGY	Karim Yehia
3	DF	EGY	Essam El Fayoumi
4	DF	EGY	Ibrahim Awad
5	DF	EGY	Seif Elkhashab
6	MF	SLE	Mamadu Sillah
7	DF	EGY	Mostafa Koshari
8	MF	EGY	Ahmed Hamzawi
10	FW	EGY	Abdallah Maradona
11	FW	EGY	Omar El Said
12	DF	CMR	Jonathan Ngwem
13	FW	ERI	Ali Sulieman
14	FW	EGY	Mohamed Farouk
15	MF	EGY	Maged Hany
16	GK	EGY	Mohamed Hagras
18	MF	EGY	Islam Abdelnaim
19	MF	EGY	Youssef Galal

No.	Pos.	Nation	Player
20	MF	EGY	Seif El Agouz
21	MF	EGY	Mohamed Hamdi
22	MF	EGY	Abdelfattah Sheta
23	GK	EGY	Farag Shawky
25	FW	EGY	Juhayna
26	MF	EGY	Mohamed Eldarf
28	MF	CIV	Serge Arnaud Aka
29	FW	EGY	Mohamed Shika
30	DF	EGY	Hassan El Shazly
31	GK	EGY	Ali El Gabry
33	DF	EGY	Mohamed Abdelmonem
35	DF	EGY	Mohamed Osam
44	MF	EGY	Abdelrahman Boda
66	DF	EGY	Mohamed Medhat
77	FW	GHA	Benjamin Boateng
88	DF	CAF	Léance Namgbema
