= We SC =

Association football club in Cairo, Egypt

- Full name: We Sporting Club نادي وي للألعاب الرياضية
- Short name: TEG
- Founded: 2006; 20 years ago as Telecom Egypt; 2023; 3 years ago as We
- Ground: Telecom Egypt Club Stadium
- Manager: Aliyu Zubairu
- League: Egyptian Second Division
- 2015–16: Second Division, 8th (Group C)
Home colours	Away colours

We Sporting Club (Arabic: نادي وي للألعاب الرياضية) is an Egyptian football club based in Cairo, Egypt. The club currently plays in the Egyptian Second Division, the second-highest league in the Egyptian football league system.

== History ==
The club, previously known as Telecom Egypt and affiliated with the Telecom Egypt company, referred to in Arabic as El Masreya lel Etesalat (Arabic: المصرية للاتصالات), retained this identity until it underwent a name change in August 2023.

The club became known after its top performances in the Egyptian Second Division, and later rose to fame for the first time after being promoted to the Egyptian Premier League in season 2007–08.

In the 2008–09 season, the club attracted much attention after they signed a contract with the retired Egyptian player Hossam Hassan to coach the team. At the time of the signing the club was highly threatened of relegation, and Hossam's main objective was to maintain the club's stance in the Egyptian Premier League, the same way he did with El-Masry, the club he coached the past season. However, and after many extraordinary performances against Egyptian top club, Itesalat club was relegated to the Egyptian Second Division in circumstances that are considered controversial.

== Current squad ==
Note: Flags indicate national team as defined under FIFA eligibility rules; some limited exceptions apply. Players may hold more than one non-FIFA nationality.

No.	Pos.	Nation	Player
1	GK	EGY	Amir Tawfik
3	DF	EGY	Mohamed Sedik
5	DF	EGY	Mahmoud Mahmoud
6	MF	EGY	Sherif Omar
7	DF	EGY	Ahmed Mohsen
9	FW	EGY	Mohamed Attia
14	FW	EGY	Osama Nabih
15	DF	EGY	Wael El-Quabbani
17	FW	EGY	Magdy Abd El-Aty
18	DF	EGY	Aboul Magd Moustafa
19	FW	UGA	Geofrey Massa

No.	Pos.	Nation	Player
20	DF	EGY	Amr Basyouni
22	DF	EGY	Mohamed Hassaan Ibrahim
23	MF	EGY	Yasser Fahmy
25	MF	EGY	Moataz Hamed
27	MF	EGY	Moataz Mahrous
30	GK	EGY	Wissam Ismail
31	MF	NGR	Abdulwaheed Titiloye
35	MF	EGY	Amr Anwar
39	MF	EGY	Magdy Atwa
45	MF	EGY	Foa'ad Salama
46	DF	EGY	Fathi Mousa
