= Faiyum SC =

Egyptian football club

- Full name: El Fayoum Sporting Club نادي الفيوم للألعاب الرياضية
- Short name: FAY
- Ground: Fayoum Stadium
- Capacity: 20,000
- Manager: Sabry El Minyawy
- League: Egyptian Second Division
- 2016–17: Second Division, 8th (Group A)

Faiyum Sporting Club (Arabic: نادي الفيوم للألعاب الرياضية) is an Egyptian football club based in Fayoum, Egypt. The club plays in the Egyptian Second Division, the second-highest league in the Egyptian football league system.

The club was founded in 1951.

The home stadium is Fayoum Stadium which can accommodate 20,000 people.

Since 2021, Nike has been the official kit sponsor for Faiyum SC.
