= Sherbeen SC =

Egyptian football club

- Full name: Sherbeen Sporting Club نادي شربين الرياضي
- Short name: SHE
- Founded: 1963; 62 years ago
- Ground: Sherbeen Stadium
- Chairman: Mamdouh Gaafar
- Manager: Mostafa Abdo
- League: Egyptian Third Division
- 2015–16: Second Division, 6th (Group E)

Sherbeen Sporting Club (Arabic: نادي شربين الرياضي), is an Egyptian football club based in Sherbin, Dakahlia Governorate, Egypt. The club currently plays in the Egyptian Third Division, the third-highest league in the Egyptian football league system.
