= Qena SC =

Egyptian football club

- Full name: Qena Sporting Club نادي قنا للألعاب الرياضية
- Short name: QEN
- Founded: 1946; 79 years ago
- Ground: Qena Stadium
- Capacity: 20,000
- Chairman: Alaa Abou Zayed
- League: Egyptian Third Division
- 2015–16: Second Division, 3rd (Group A)

Qena Sporting Club (Arabic: نادي قنا للألعاب الرياضية), is an Egyptian football club based in Qena, Egypt. The club is currently playing in the Egyptian Third Division, the third-highest league in the Egyptian football league system.
