= BWADC SC =

Egyptian sports club

- Full name: BWADC Sporting Club نادي شركة مياه البحيرة الرياضي
- Short name: BWA
- Ground: BWADC Stadium
- Manager: Abdek Razek Abouda
- League: Egyptian Third Division
- 2015–16: Third Division, 1st (Group H) (Promoted)

BWADC Sporting Club (Beheira Water and Drainage Company Sporting Club) (Arabic: نادي شركة مياه البحيرة الرياضي), also known as Meiah El Beheira, is an Egyptian football club based in Abu Hummus, Beheira, Egypt. The club is currently playing in the Egyptian Third Division, the third-highest league in the Egyptian football league system.

The club was founded in 1993 and the football section made its debut in 1994.
