= MS Koum Hamada =

Egyptian football club

- Full name: Markaz Shabab Koum Hamada نادي مركز شباب كوم حمادة
- Short name: MSK
- Ground: MS Koum Hamada Stadium
- Chairman: Reda Abou Eleiwa
- Manager: Gamal El Makas
- League: Egyptian Third Division
- 2015–16: Second Division, 6th (Group F)

MS Koum Hamada (Arabic: نادي مركز شباب كوم حمادة), also known as Koum Hamada Youth Center, or simply Koum Hamada YC, is an Egyptian football club based in Koum Hamada, El Beheira, Egypt. The club currently plays in the Egyptian Third Division, the third-highest league in the Egyptian football league system.
