= El Minya SC =

Association football club in Minya, Egypt

Minya SC
- Full name: Minya Sporting Club نادي المنيا للألعاب الرياضية
- Short name: MIN
- Founded: 1928; 98 years ago
- Ground: Sohag Stadium
- Capacity: 20,000
- Manager: Samir Kamouna
- League: Egyptian Second Division
- 2018–19: Second Division, 5th (Group A)
Home colours	Away colours	Third colours

Minya Sporting Club (Arabic: نادي المنيا للألعاب الرياضية), is an Egyptian football club based in El Minya, Egypt. The club plays in the Egyptian Second Division, the second-highest league in the Egyptian football league system.

== Current squad ==
Egyptian Football Association (EFA) rules are that a team may only have 3 foreign-born players in the squad. Note: Flags indicate national team as defined under FIFA eligibility rules; some limited exceptions apply. Players may hold more than one non-FIFA nationality.

No.	Pos.	Nation	Player
2	GK	EGY	Samah Ali
8	MF	EGY	Islam Roshdi
9	FW	EGY	Amr Osman
15	FW	EGY	Mohamed Ramdan
19	FW	EGY	Mahmoud Kaoud

No.	Pos.	Nation	Player
26	MF	EGY	Smba
-	DF	EGY	Rambo
-	MF	EGY	Walid Anwar
-	MF	EGY	Ayman Hasanien
-	MF	EGY	Amr Mohsin
-	MF	EGY	Mohamed Al Said
