= Al Wasta SC =

Association football club in Beni Suef, Egypt

Al Wasta
- Full name: Al Wasta Sporting Club
- Short name: WAS
- League: Egyptian Third Division

Al Wasta Sporting Club (Arabic: نادي الواسطى للألعاب الرياضية), sometimes referred to as Al Wasty, is an Egyptian football club based in Beni Suef, Egypt. The club is currently playing in the Egyptian Third Division, the third-highest league in the Egyptian football league system. The club participates in the Egypt Cup competition.
