= MS Tamya =

Egyptian football club

- Full name: Markaz Shabab Tamya نادي مركز شباب طامية
- Short name: MST
- Founded: 1972
- Ground: Damu Sport City Stadium
- Chairman: Abdel Wahab Abdel Zaher
- Manager: Kotb Ahmed
- League: Egyptian Second Division
- 2022–23: Second Division, 13th (Group B)

MS Tamya (Arabic: نادي مركز شباب طامية), also known as Tamya Youth Center, or simply Tamya YC, is an Egyptian football club based in Tamya, Fayoum, Egypt. The club currently plays in the Egyptian Second Division, the second-highest league in the Egyptian football league system.
