= Said El Mahalla SC =

Egyptian football club

- Full name: Said El Mahalla Shooting Club نادي الصيد بالمحلة الرياضي
- Short name: SMH
- Ground: Ghazl El Mahalla Stadium
- Chairman: Mahmoud Shehata
- League: Egyptian Second Division B

Said El Mahalla Shooting Club (Arabic: نادي الصيد بالمحلة الرياضي), is an Egyptian football club based in El Mahalla, Egypt. The club use to play in the Egyptian Second Division B, the third-highest league in the Egyptian football league system.

== Stadium ==
Their home stadium is Ghazl El Mahalla Stadium, the stadium has a capacity of 20,000.
