= Kum aldabae =

Village in Egypt

Kum Aldabae
- Village
- كوم الضبع
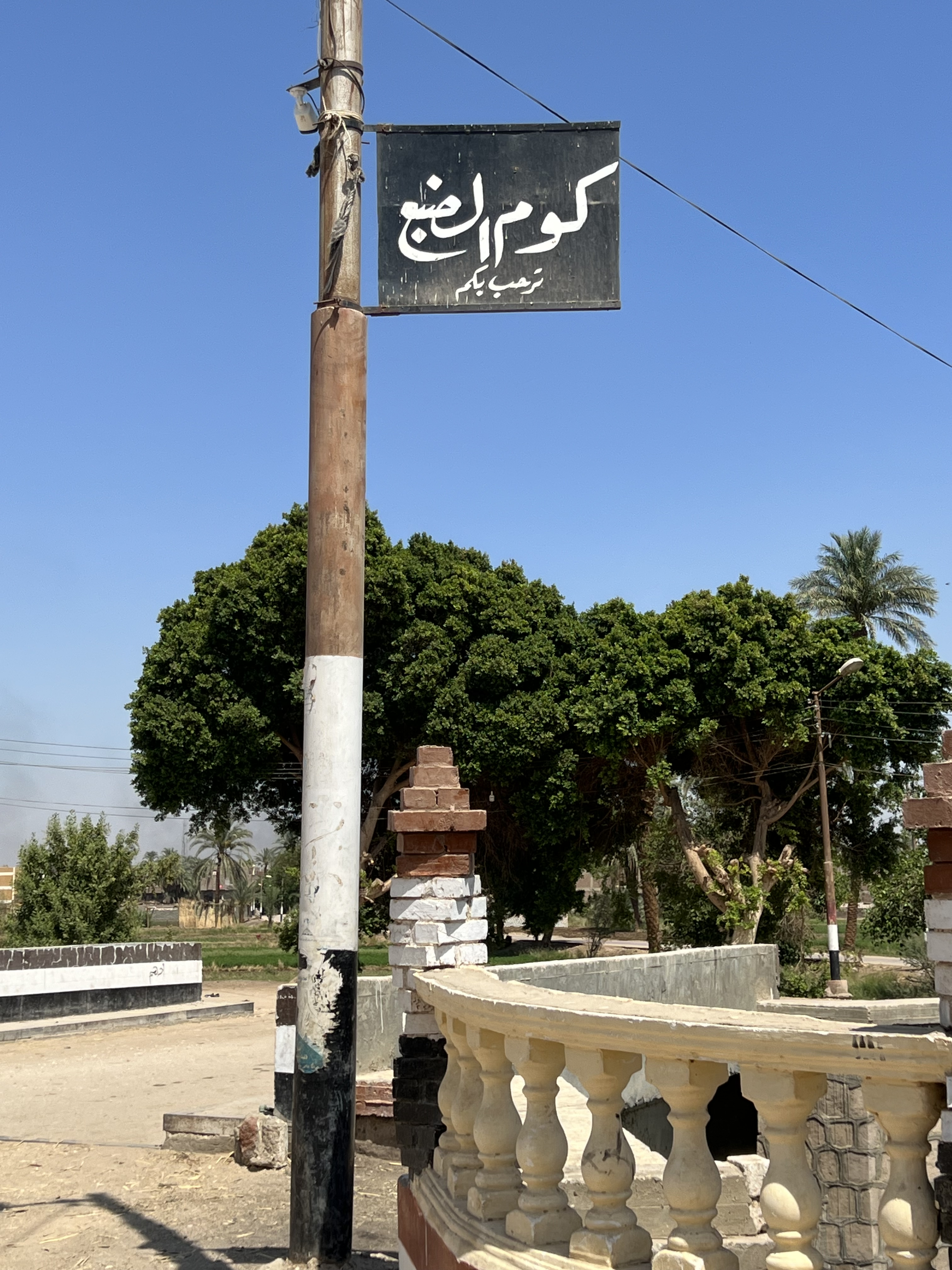
- Interactive map of Kum Aldabae
- Coordinates: 30°28′03″N 31°01′46″E
- Country: Egypt
- Governorate: Monufia
- Markaz: El Bagour

Population (January 2023)
  - Total: 16,514
- Time zone: UTC+2 (EET)
  - Summer (DST): UTC+3 (EEST)

Kum Aldabae (Arabic: كوم الضبع) is a village located in Al-Bajour markaz in the Menoufia Governorate in Egypt. The population of Al-Kasafah is 16,514.

== Location ==
Kom El-Dabaa is located on the eastern side of the Monufia Governorate, and its location is from the east of Banha – 19 km, from Minuf and from the west – 22 km, Shibeen El-Kom from the north – 17 km and Ashmoun from the south – 24 km.

== See also ==
- List of cities and towns in Egypt
