= Ezz =

Ezz or EZZ may refer to:

- Ezz Steel, the largest steel company in Egypt and the Middle East and North Africa Region
- Ahmed Ezz (disambiguation), various people
- Ezz Eddin Hosni (1927–2013), an Egyptian musician and composer
- EZZ, FAA identifier for Cameron Memorial Airport, a public use airport in Clinton County, Missouri
