= Ibrahim Salem Mohammedin =

Minister of Industry
- In office March 27, 1973 – September 25, 1974
- President: Anwar Sadat
- Preceded by: Yahya Al Mulla
- Succeeded by: Mahmoud Ali Hassan

Chairman of the Alexandria National Iron and Steel Company
- In office 1982–2000
- Preceded by: Company established by Mohammedin
- Succeeded by: Ahmed Ezz

Personal details
- Born: September 15, 1921; Damietta Governorate, Egypt
- Died: November 12, 2018 (aged 97); Cairo, Egypt

Ibrahim Salem Mohammedin (إبراهيم سالم محمدين; September 15, 1921 – November 12, 2018) was an Egyptian engineer and industrialist. Mohammedin served as the Minister of Industry from 1973 until 1974 under President Anwar Sadat.

In 1982, Mohammedin founded the Alexandria National Iron and Steel Company (now known as Ezz Steel) and served as its chairman from 1982 to 2000. He stepped down as chairman in 2000 and was succeeded by Ahmed Ezz.

Mohammedin was born in Damietta Governorate, Egypt, on September 15, 1921. He died in Cairo from an illness on November 12, 2018, at the age of 97.
