= Kafr Zarqan =

Village in Monufia Governorate, Egypt

Kafr Zurqan كفر زرقان
- Village
- Location in Egypt
- Coordinates: 30°37′40″N 30°54′19″E
- Country: Egypt
- Governorate: Monufia
- District: Tala
- Time zone: UTC+2 (EET)
  - Summer (DST): UTC+3 (EEST)

Kafr Zurqan (Arabic: كفر زرقان) is a village in the Tala Markaz in Monufia Governorate in Egypt. It is located next to the village of Mit Abu El Kom, where former President Anwar Sadat was born. It is affiliated to the local unit in Mit Abu al-Kom.

== Population ==
The population of Kafr Zarqan was 1,628, according to the 2006 census.

== Facilities ==
The village primary school is named Anwar Sadat Primary School. An Iraqi mosque is in the village. Sama Ahmad Nabil Salman Bakery is there along with the Kafr Zarqan Youth Center.

== Governance ==
Fathi Salman served as a Member of the People's Assembly in the 1971-1976 legislative term for the constituency of Tala.

== See also ==
- List of cities and towns in Egypt
