= Shanawan =

Shanawan شنوان
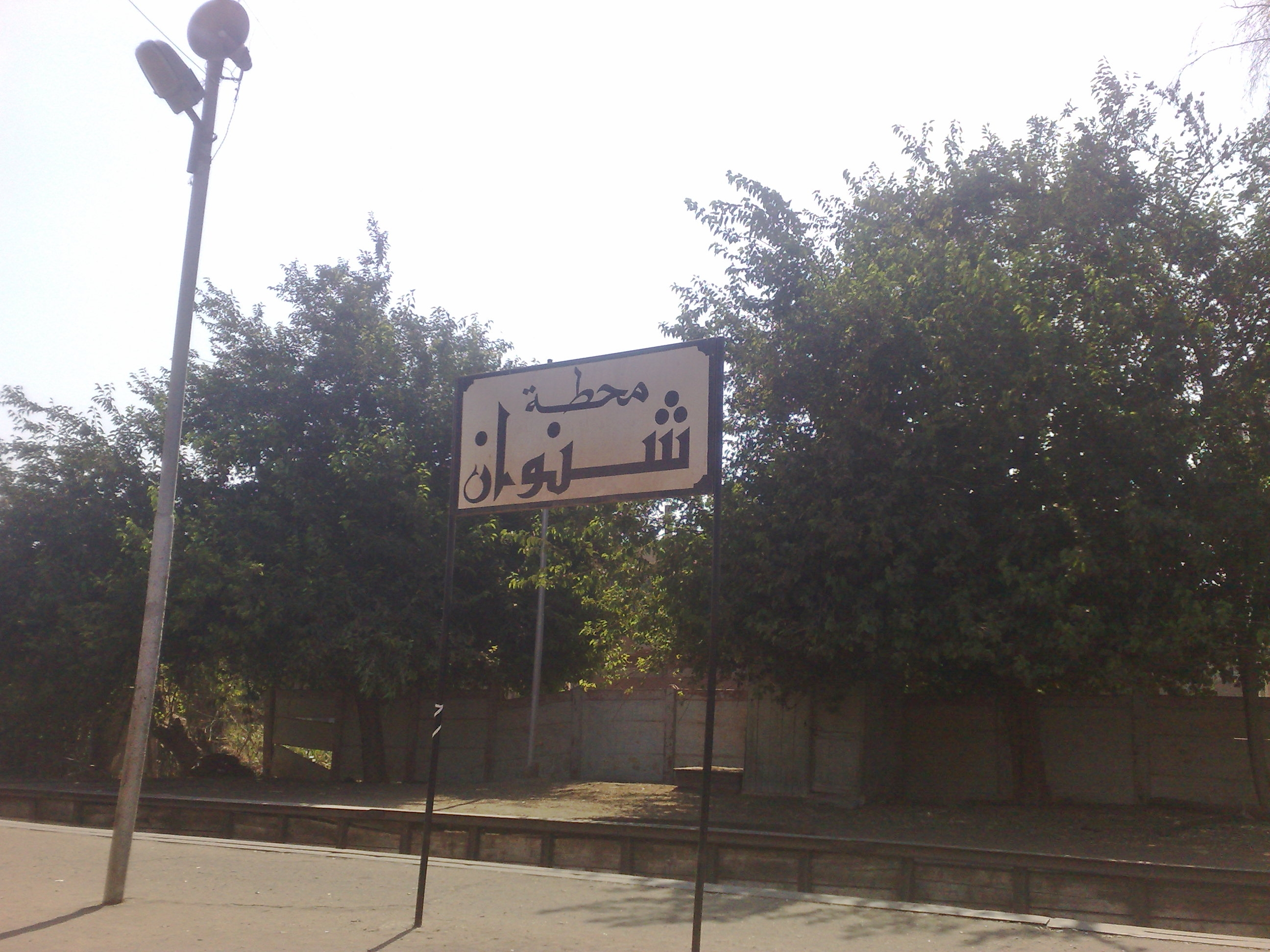
- Shanawan Railway Station

- Location in Egypt
- Coordinates: 30°30′11″N 31°0′21″E
- Country: Egypt
- Governorate: Monufia

Population (2006)
  - Total: 33,285
- Time zone: UTC+2 (EET)
  - Summer (DST): UTC+3 (EEST)

Shanawan (Arabic: شنوان) is one of the biggest villages in Monufia Governorate, Egypt. It is in the middle between Shibin El Kom City and Al-Baghor City. Shanawan is famous for vegetable production. It is marked by the taro (AlQulqas).

The biggest families in Shanawan are ElSheikhamer, Nada, soffa, Elnemr, Sherif, Eissa, El-Gazzar, Al-Naggar, Elnemr, Al-Bambi, Al-Khaiyat, Abou Hashhash, Abdou, Zaied, Abd El Bary and Abou-Elsoud.
