= Mohammed Tayea =

Egyptian political leader (1945–200)

Mohammed Ali Tayea (1945-2000) was one of the political leaders in Egypt during the Sadat and Mubarak era. He died on 1 May 2000.

== Introduction ==
Mohammed Tayea was born on 20 July 1945 in Alexandria at his mother's residence. He lived in Sohag at Girga city during his childhood. He gained a bachelor's degree in civil engineering at Assiut University in 1971.

After graduating, he worked at the Red Sea construction company until 1974 on the board of directors in Suez alongside his work as an engineering contractor.

In 1977 he married Ms. Fawzia Abo Zeid AbduLatif after graduating with a degree in philosophy at Ain Shams University. He was elected to the Egyptian parliament in 1984; after his death, his widow Fawzia Tayea ran for office.

They had 3 children (Shehab, Shady and Shahinaz). Shehab graduated in naval engineering at the Arab Academy for Science and Technology, Shady in commerce at the Modern Academy and Shahinaz with honours in engineering at the Modern Academy.

== Involvement in projects ==
- Suez Hospital
- Minia Hospital
- Ismailia University Hospital
- Medical Center in Bor Tawfik
- Badr Mosque in Suez
- Fayed Mosque in Ismailia
- Fertilizer factory in Suez and Talkha
- Some projects with the Nasr Petroleum Company
- Suez company for petrol processing.
- Educational buildings for the authorities
- Low-cost, mid-range and luxury housing

Major projects include:

- Giant power and water stations in South Sinai and East Kantara
- Automatic mill in Ismailia
- Sand brick factory in Quesna

== Conference participation ==
- Management of Major Projects Conference (Cairo, 1980)
- International Housing Conference (Sarajevo, Yugoslavia, 1986)
- The Development of Construction Equipment Conference (London, England, 1987)
- Management of Companies Conference (Alexandria, 1991)

== Appointments ==
- Member of Wafd Party in Suez
- Member of the Egyptian Parliament for the Suez area - New Wafd party 1984
- Member of the Housing Commission in Parliament
- Member of Engineers Union
- Member of Human Rights Watch and Amnesty International
- Member of Contractors Federation and Commission on Classification
- Member of Egyptian Civil Engineers Society
- Member of Egyptian Business Administration Society
- Member of Collaborative Society Education in Schools

He also was involved in many charities such as the Qurran Charity in Suez which he headed.
