= Dekheila =

There are a number of places named Dekheila

- Akrotiri and Dhekelia
- Dekheila (Egypt) (Alexandria)
- HMS Grebe (Dekheila Airfield)

== See also ==
- Al-Ezz Dekheila Steel Co.
