= Tamer Abdel Raouf =

- Died: August 19, 2013; Army checkpoint at Damanhur, Beheira Northern Governorate
- Cause of death: Shot in head
- Occupations: Bureau chief and Regional Director for Egypt's Al-Ahram Daily Newspaper
- Employer: Al-Ahram Newspaper

Tamer Abdel Raouf, an Egyptian journalist, bureau chief, and regional director of Egypt's Al-Ahram newspaper, was shot dead at a military checkpoint in Damanhur, Beheira Northern Governorate on August 19, 2013. In late November 2012, then President Mohamed Morsi passed a Constitutional declaration that gave him additional powers, which led to the 2012-13 Egyptian protests and his removal from office by the military on July 3, 2013. After the military coup, many Egyptian news reporters and journalists were targeted by military and police. Raouf was one of the journalists killed.

== Personal life ==
Abdel Raouf is originally from the village of Bani Gharyan, Quesna, Menoufia. Raouf was living in the town of Kafr El Dawwar, Beheira Northern Governorate at the time.

== Career ==
Tamer Abdel Raouf was the bureau chief and regional director for the Al-Ahram daily newspaper in Egypt. He had just finished meeting with the new Egyptian governor, Mostafa Hadhound, and was killed on his way home after.

== Death ==
The location of Damanhur, Egypt is displayed relative to the capital city of Cairo.

Tamer Abdel Raouf was driving back just days after the August 2013 Rabaa massacre from a meeting with Egypt's new governor, Mostafa Hadhound, on the night of Monday, August 19, 2013, when he was killed on his way home. The meeting had lasted to before Egypt's curfew of 7 p.m. After taking three other journalists home from the meeting, Raouf and Hamed Al-Barbari, a journalist from the daily Al-Gomhuria Egyptian newspaper, were on their way to their homes in Kafr El Dawwar. On their way there, they approached a military vehicle checkpoint on an agricultural road in Damanhur, Beheira. Barburi states that as they approached they were waved on by soldiers to turn around and leave the checkpoint, and as they turned around to leave, soldiers fired on the vehicle, shooting Raouf in the head and injuring Barbari. The vehicle then came to a stop after hitting a light post. Barburi also stated that they arrived at the checkpoint shortly after 6 p.m., before the 7 p.m. curfew.

However, the military states that the vehicle approached the checkpoint at a very high speed. Warnings were yelled and warning shots were fired, and Raouf's vehicle still sped towards them, so they fired on the vehicle. It was also stated that as Raouf attempted to turn around and leave the checkpoint, they fired because the soldiers believed they were trying to escape. Contrary to Barburi's statement, the military stated that Raouf's vehicle approached the checkpoint after the 7 p.m. curfew, not at 6 p.m. They also stated that shots were fired at the checkpoint by Raouf's vehicle. Barburi was detained for four days to investigate this after a handgun was found in the vehicle by police.

== Context ==
In late November 2012, Mohamad Morsi, Egypt's president at the time, passed a new constitutional declaration that gave him enormous power. This led to the 2012-13 Egyptian protests, which led to Morsi's removal from office by the military on July 3, 2013. After his removal, many news reporters and journalists had been detained, attacked, and even killed by supporters of Morsi, which makes Egyptian journalist's and news reporter's jobs very dangerous.

Early August 2013, Egypt's government ordered a country-wide curfew of 7 p.m. after two pro-Morsi protest camps were broken up as they demanded for the return of Morsi to office. This curfew was set to last until the following month. However, news reporters and journalists were exempt from this dusk-to-dawn curfew so that they could do their jobs. However, there had been many journalists stating that their exemption from the curfew was not being respected.

== Impact ==
Since Morsi's removal of office on July 3, 2013, Egyptian news reporters and journalists had been targeted by military and police. 40 news providers had been attacked, 80 journalists detained, and five journalists killed by supporters of Morsi. Raouf was one of the journalists killed because of "government-ordered violence" and chaos in Egypt at the time. Raouf's death demonstrated the difficulty and danger of Egyptian news reporters and journalist's jobs at the time.

== Reactions ==
Raouf's death led to many organizations calling for investigations to be done to determine the exact circumstances of his death. Many calls were also made pushing to end the violence in Egypt and ensure that news reporters and journalists were not targeted by military and police so that they can report news safely without danger.

Irina Bokova, director-general of UNESCO said deploring his death and calling for a thorough investigation it. She also stated that "This is an issue of freedom of expression and information. I call on the Egyptian authorities to do everything possible to ensure the security of media workers.

Reporters Without Borders said, "Reporters must be able to work without their lives being put in danger, regardless of the political fault lines. We deplore the passivity of the new Egyptian authorities and we urge them to react quickly by taking concrete measures to guarantee journalists' safety and respect for freedom of information."

The National Press Club called out the Egyptian government directly, said, "The Egyptian government appears to be targeting both domestic and foreign journalists for no reason other than they are reporting the news. There is a desperate need for the Egyptian people to know what's happening as unrest grips the country. The regime's open and violent crackdown suggests they want to keep their citizens in the dark." NPC also called for investigations to be done on all news reporters or journalists killed or harmed, and to take action against those responsible.

The DOHA Centre For Media Freedom (DCMF) also reacted, calling for Egyptian authorities to respect news reporters and journalists as they do their job, as it is important for them to get out the news without being in danger or risking their lives. They also called for the release of all detained journalists.
