= Gaskoin Richard Morden Wright =

English surgeon and missionary

Gaskoin Richard Morden Wright

Gaskoin Richard Morden Wright (18 April 1860 – 10 September 1923) was an English surgeon and missionary who founded the St Luke's Hospital of Nablus while he served with the Church Mission Society (CMS). St. Luke's Hospital remains the only charitable hospital in Nablus, Palestine as of 2022. Wright attended Surrey County School and St. Bartholomew's Teaching Hospital. He also published on the use of turpentine in gallstone disease. He was registered as a surgeon and physician in 1883. In 1890 he was accepted by the CMS working initially in Uganda. In October 1893. Wright went to Palestine, where he had his largest impact. Wright died in 1923 in Metheringham, Lincolnshire, England.

== Early life ==
Wright was born on 18 April 1860 in Wickhambrook, Suffolk, England to Morden Carthew Wright (1836–1886) and Arabella Hutfield Sherry (1837–1881). Wright had several brothers and sisters, including his brother Sacheverel Henry Wright (1863–1937), sister Amelia Ann Frances Wright (1864–1864), brother William Carthew Wright (1865–), and brother Percy Edward Wright (1867–1945).

Wright lived in Surrey until he was 11, when he moved to Walworth Road, Lambeth, London, England; he and his family continued living there until 1881, when he moved to 128 Walworth Road, Newington, London, England, with his father.

=== Education ===
Wright attended Surrey County School, a public school in Southeast England; he then studied medicine at St. Bartholomew's Teaching Hospital in West Smithfield, London. After graduating from St. Barts, Wright became a member of the Royal College of Surgeons and a Licentiate of the Royal College of Physicians in 1883, and briefly worked as a house-surgeon in Lancashire.

=== Family life ===
Wright was married twice and had eight children.

In October 1885 Wright married Catherine Elizabeth Denton (1860–1890) in Ormskirk, Lancashire. Wright had one daughter and two sons with Catherine named Herbert Morden Wright (1886–1969), Dorothy Hope Wright (1889–1979) and Eric Devereux Morden Wright.

After his first wife's death, Wright married Elizabeth (Elise) Kauffmann, a fellow C.M.S missionary. They had five children, Jessie Arabella Wright (1897-1950), Morden Hutfield Wright (1897–1967), Winifred Hope Wright (1899), Kathleen Ethel Wright (1902), and Gaskoin Montague Morden Wright (1904–1970). Wright's children were all born in Palestine. His son, Gaskoin Montague Morden Wright also became a physician and surgeon and was a C.M.S missionary.

== Mission work ==
=== Uganda mission ===
On 4 November 1890 Wright was accepted as a missionary by the Church Mission Society (C.M.S). During a town hall meeting in Salford, England in 1891, he volunteered to be part of the missions in Uganda. Wright was the first member of the Manchester Lay Workers Union to volunteer to work in a foreign country. On 21 April a meeting was held at the C.M.S Manchester Association Hall to bid farewell to Wright and his companions before they left for Africa. Wright left for Africa on 17 May 1891. He was accompanied by the Rev. R.P Ashe, Rev. G. H. V. Greaves, Mr. Hubbard, and Mr. Walter Collins; Rev Greaves died of dysentery on 12 July. Wright and Collin reached Uganda on 31 October 1891.

Shortly after arriving in Uganda, Wright began working with patients. The daily routine included daily prayer and bible reading and church on Sunday with the Church of England service. Wright strongly believed that spreading the word of God was an essential part of his missionary work and felt that God had sent him on his mission to Uganda.

Wright's service in Uganda was marked by significant illness. Wright was sick for several months in Spring 1892. Months later, in August 1892, Wright developed blackwater fever. Following an attack of dysentery, he was ordered by the Imperial British East Africa Company (I.B.E.A) to return to England. Wright left Africa on 26 September 1892, accompanied by Mr. F.C. Smith. They arrived in London on 17 January 1893.

On his return, he stayed engaged in missionary service as documented by a sermon about the manners and traditions of the native people of Uganda during the annual C.M.S Sermon in Macclesfield, Cheshire, England in October 1893.

In early 2026, his journal and notes from his time in Mengo are held at the University of Birmingham.

=== Nablus mission and Founding St. Luke's Hospital ===
In November 1893, Wright was forbidden by the Medical Board to go to Uganda and was instead appointed to Palestine. On 5 January 1984 Wright left London for Constantinople en route to Jaffa with the support of St. Philip's Episcopal Church. Wright reached Nablus, Palestine, the site of his most significant missionary work, on 14 February 1894. After arriving at Nablus, Wright opened a temporary hospital. After people found out that a European doctor opened a hospital nearby, patient volume increased, with Wright and his team treating about 200 to 250 cases each week. Wright also opened a dispensary nearby despite opposition from the local authorities.

Opposition to Wright's work came from his attempts to teach the local people about Christianity. On 8 November 1895, Wright's team and a German clergyman were attacked by a mob of about 500 people. While a Syrian C.M.S. worker was hit with a rock on the head, nobody was fatally injured. During the attack, Wright was in a conference in Jerusalem and tried to get the female workers of his team to Jaffa, but this was prevented by military activity. After the attack, the C.M.S Wali in Beirut requested protection from the governor for the Christian missionaries; in response, the governor sent 3500 troops to protect the CMS missionaries including Wright and his team.

Opposition continued to Wright's missionary work, and many people sent petitions to the governor to shut down the hospital; despite this, Wright continued working and expanded the women's wing to accommodate the increase in patients of around 10,000 per year. In 1896 Wright requested funding from CMS for a new building, as the hospital frequently flooded. The request was denied due to lack of funds.

In 1898 Wright applied for funding for a small hospital again. He was initially denied by the new governor, who reportedly requested a bribe; however, the British Embassy Secretary, Arthur Ponsonby went to Nablus and demanded that Wright's team be able to build a wall to expand their existing hospital.

In 1989 Wright became sick again for three months and his team took over his work. On 2 April 1898 he went back to England with his wife to attend the 17 May C.M.S. committee. Wright and his wife returned to Nablus on 8 December 1898.

In 1900 Gaskoin reported that the new hospital increased efficiency and patient treatment volume. This hospital became the only hospital in the region as both the government and military hospitals had closed. St Luke's hospital offered church services in the mornings and evenings. Others working alongside Wright included Daoud Katibeh, a local doctor and Ms. Bedells, Ms. Kitchen, and Ms. Lawford, who were nurses. The hospital had forty beds and was essential during the cholera outbreak of 1902 when 500 people died; the hospital dealt with approximately 400 patients a year.

On 26 May 1903, again sick, Wright went back to England. His place was taken by another CMS medical missionary Frederick Oakley Lasbrey who had a hospital in Old Cairo. When Lasbrey returned to Old Cairo., Dr Cooper, another C.M.S. missionary, took control of the hospital. When Cooper was called back by the C.M.S., Wright returned to Nablus on 25 March 1904.

In 1906 Wright added two recovery wards to accommodate the growing number of patients that visited the hospital.

In 1917 Wright retired from missionary service.

== Legacy ==
The St Luke's Hospital in Nablus that Wright founded is still in operation in 2025. and remains the only charitable hospital in Nablus. Wright also published a book titled, Value of Turpentine in Gallstone Operants; however, this method never found a place in patient treatment.

When Wright retired from missionary work he was honored by the C.M.S for his long service.

== Death ==
After his missionary work Wright and his wife returned to London. Wright died on 10 September 1923 in Metheringham, Lincoln, England.
