= Francis John Harpur =

Doctor, medical missionary

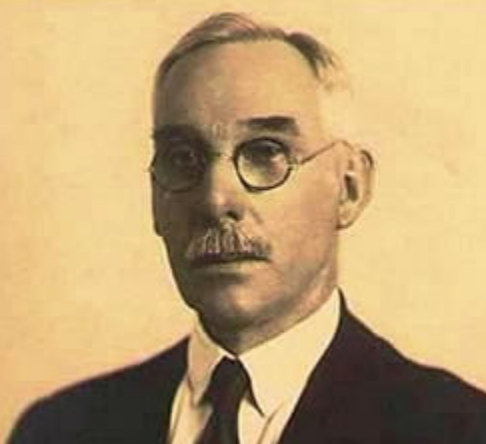
- Harpur in Menouf (1920)
- Born: 1861; Dublin, Ireland
- Died: 11 January 1947 (aged 86); Armagh, Northern Ireland
- Education: Trinity College Dublin 1885 (MBBch)

Francis John Harpur (1860 – 1947) was an Irish Protestant, doctor, medical missionary, and minister for the Church Missionary Society. Harpur actively served for nearly 40 years through missions predominantly in Northeastern Africa. Harpur made several contributions with regard to accessibility, establishment, and administration of medicine in the form of dispensaries and hospitals. Harpur mainly headed a medical mission in Old Cairo but also initiated missions in Arabia, Sawakin, Omdurman, Khartoum, and along the Nile.

== Early life and education ==
Harpur was born in Dublin, Ireland in 1861. He was raised as an Anglican Christian in Ireland by his father Thomas Bernard Harpur and his mother Jane Law. Harpur attended primary school at Galway Grammar School. In 1883, he graduated from Trinity College Dublin with a Bachelor of Arts degree (BA). Harpur continued his education at Trinity College Dublin with work at L.M. Rotunda teaching hospital. He achieved his MBBCh in 1885.

== Personal life ==
Harpur married Edith Constance Fitzgerald on September 10, 1885, in Mountmellick, Ireland. Harpur was accepted as a medical missionary by the Church Missionary Society on March 17, 1885. Harpur was joined by his wife on many of his missions, including his first missions in Egypt. Fitzgerald acted as an aide and assistant for Harpur’s medical services and was an active leader in the locally established churches. Her work in the church consisted of leading musical prayer and teaching hymns.

Harpur had one son: Nour. Harpur adopted Nour Aly (who became Nour Harpur) in 1889 during his mission to Sawakin. Nour was a young Sudanese orphan boy whose parents died from starvation. Harpur took in and cared for Nour for many years. Eventually, Nour disappeared from the Harpur family and it is rumored he was taken by the people of Cairo to be converted back to Islam from Christianity.

== Missionary work ==
=== Work in Arabia ===
Harpur began his work as a medical missionary through a mission in Arabia. In 1885, Harpur began aiding mission leaders, providing insight and support, and administering medicine in the city of Hodeida in Yemen. One year later in 1886, Harpur carried out similar responsibilities in Aden.

=== Old Cairo Mission ===
Harpur began to establish his most prominent medical work upon his arrival to Old Cairo in 1889. With the help of Llewellyn Gwynne, Harpur established hospitals and clinics in Egypt. Cities and villages in which Harpur traveled included Shubra, El Salheya, and Benha. Harpur’s work consisted of orchestrating medical support clinics, aiding government dispensaries, and teaching lessons of Christianity and the Bible to local residents. Throughout his time on the mission, Harpur observed an increase in hospital and dispensary attendance.

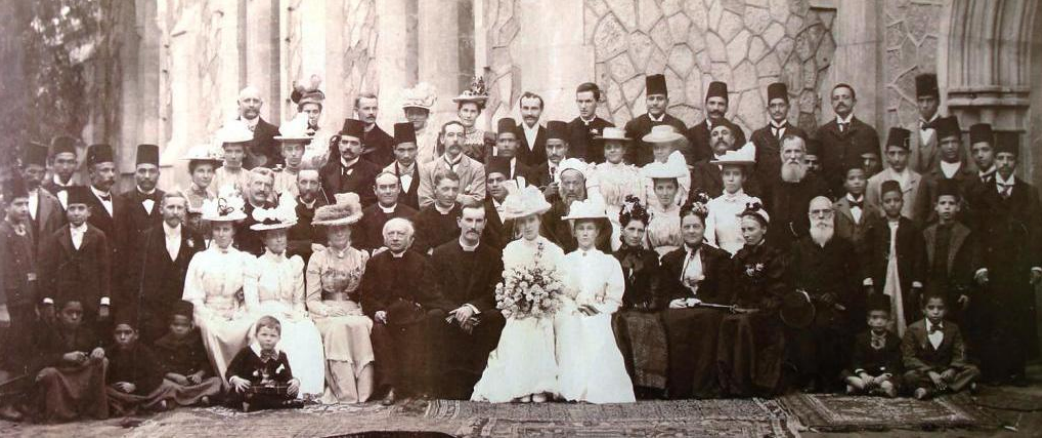
Missionaries at Rev. Douglas M. Thornton's wedding in 1889 Cairo (Harpur pictured in left-center third row)

Harpur’s work was seen as highly evangelical. Harpur was the president of the building committee dedicated to constructing the church in Old Cairo. He was commonly known as a “zealous man of god” who spread his passion as an Evangelist. Harpur had pride for his wife Edith who played harmonium in the church and taught the community hymns. Harpur gave daily Bible lessons to his son Nour and provided various communities with printed copies of prayer in the local language. In addition, Harpur conducted evangelistic meetings for young men.

In 1892, Harpur resigned from his missionary duties on account of his wife’s health. On March 1, 1892, he traveled to England with Mrs. Harpur to support her recovery, and returned to Egypt in October 1893 to resume charge of the medical mission in Old Cairo. Between 1893 and 1900, Harpur traveled to and from England. His work during this period consisted of the construction of schools and medical clinics. He established, with Gwynne, mission stations and schools in North Sudan at Omdurman in 1899 and Khartoum in 1900.

=== Nile Itinerancy Mission ===
In 1904, Harpur initiated and led the Nile Itinerancy Mission. His desire to conduct this mission stemmed from the greater need for medical care outside of Old Cairo, particularly in smaller, less developed villages along the Nile.

Harpur bought a sailboat, known in Egypt as a dahabiya. He equipped the dahabiya with medical supplies and tents. Harpur sailed along the Nile to various villages, setting up tent hospitals and providing medical help. Once on land, Harpur would travel to neighboring communities by donkey in order to treat as many patients as possible. He treated patients for endemic diseases, eye disease, and other medical issues. Additionally, Harpur led Bible classes in the evenings. Uniquely, Harpur was not subsidized by governments to build and run his hospitals on the Nile, and they were supported by his Christian staff.

One of Harpur’s tent hospitals survives today. During his journey along the Nile, Harpur provided medical care along a small canal near the village of El Bagour in the Province of Monufia. There, Sheikh Bassiouni el Saidi pleaded to Harpur to open a permanent hospital. In 1910, Harpur agreed and established the first hospital in Menouf. The hospital is now known as the Harpur Memorial Hospital. It operates successfully and has recently celebrated its 110th anniversary.

== Death and legacy ==
Harpur died on January 11, 1947, in Armagh, Northern Ireland at the age of 86. He is remembered for his successful endeavors and passion to improve global health. He was admired for his leadership and desire to spread healthcare where it was lacking, rather than just supporting current missions. Harpur’s legacy is also survived through Harpur Memorial Hospital, which supports many patients today. Even with grave troubles in life, such as his wife’s sickness and death, Harpur remained resolute and dedicated to his work. Harpur persevered as an evangelist, physician, and surgeon to spread knowledge and care. He laid the foundation for future missionaries that built upon his creations and left a lasting effect on local and global health. Harpur was able to create healthier and more informed societies that would benefit from his advice and establishments for many years.
