= Tala, Egypt =

Tala تلا
- City
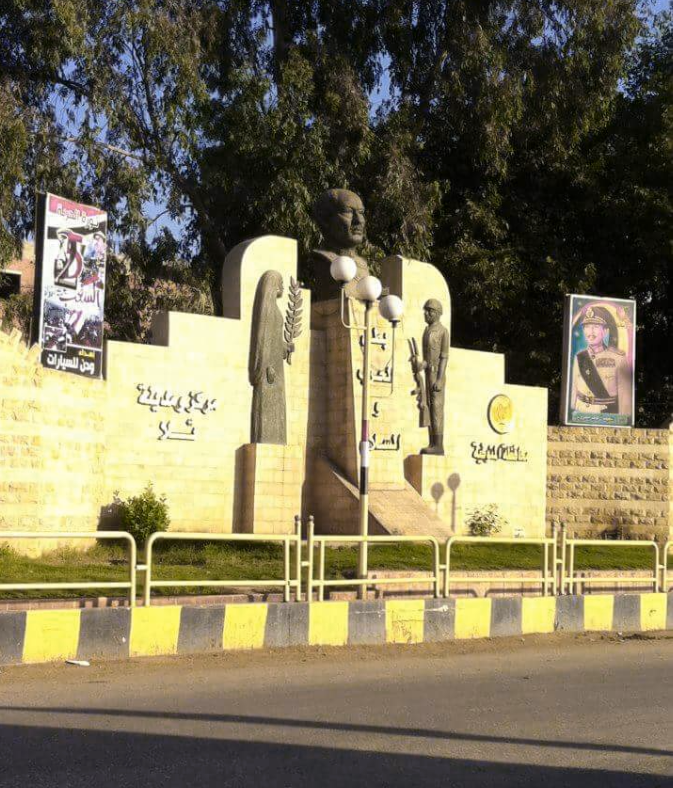

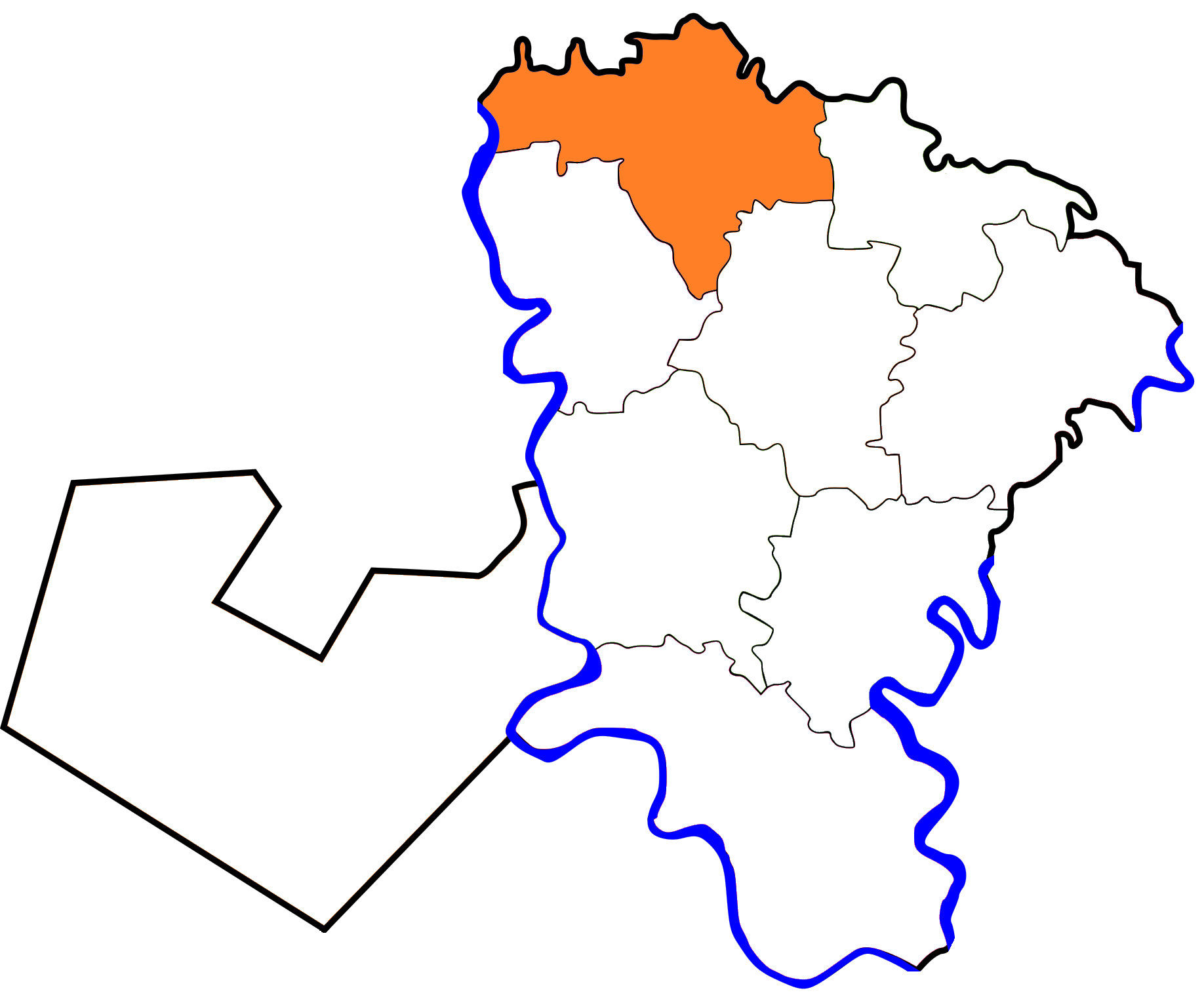
- Location in Monufia Governorate

- Location in Egypt
- Coordinates: 30.680108°N 30.943758°E
- Country: Egypt
- Governorate: Monufia

Area
  - Total: 188.3 km^{2} (72.7 sq mi)

Population (2021)
  - Total: 413,839
  - Density: 2,198/km^{2} (5,692/sq mi)
- Time zone: UTC+2 (EET)
  - Summer (DST): UTC+3 (EEST)
- Climate: BWh

Tala (Arabic: تلا) is located in the Nile Delta region of traditionally agricultural northern Monufia Governorate, Egypt. Tala is surrounded by greenery, with fields of crops and palm trees across its landscape, typical of the Nile Delta.

The town is characterized by a close-knit community where families have lived for generations. Tala's heritage follows rural Egyptian culture in its food, architecture, and local customs. Alongside its rural atmosphere, Tala has a marketplace where local people trade fresh produce, handmade crafts, and other goods, reflecting the communal lifestyle of the Delta region.

== See also ==
Kafr Zarqan
