= Naguib El-Helaly Gohar =

Egyptian academic (1944–2015)

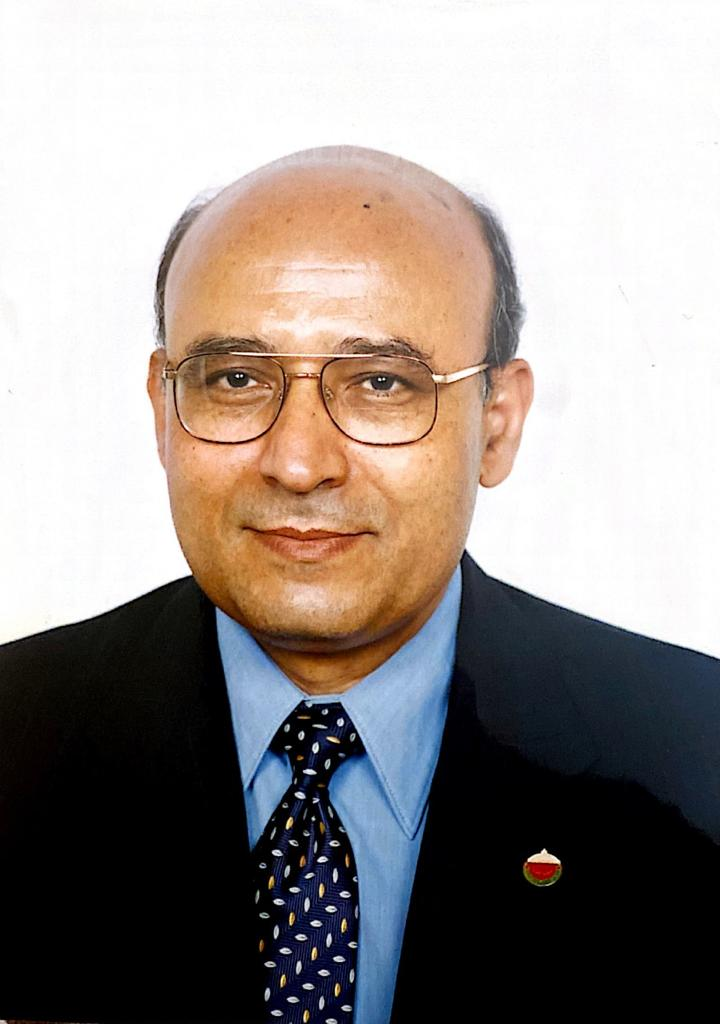
Naguib El-Helaly Farid Gohar

Naguib El-Helaly Farid Gohar (September 17, 1944 – February 24, 2015) was an Egyptian professor of agriculture who served as president of Cairo University from 1999 to 2004. He was also a member of the Egyptian Shura Council from 2003 to 2008.

Gohar was born in Berket El-Sabaa, Monufia Governorate. He obtained his Bachelor of Science degree, with honors, in agricultural sciences from Cairo University in 1964, majoring in animal production. He also obtained his Master of Science in poultry science from Cairo in 1969. From 1969 to 1974 he studied in the United States at the University of Wisconsin–Madison, obtaining his Doctor of Philosophy degree in poultry science in 1974.

Returning to Egypt, he was appointed assistant professor in the department of animal production at Cairo University and was promoted associate professor in 1979 and full professor in 1984. He served as deputy dean of the faculty of agriculture for students and education affairs from 1993 to 1995, dean of the faculty from 1995 to 1997, and university vice president for students and education affairs from 1997 to 1998, before being appointed president in 1999. He retired from the university in 2005 and is now a professor emeritus.

He also served as visiting professor in the faculties of agriculture at the University of Khartoum in Sudan in 1977 and at the University of Minnesota in the United States in 1978.
