= Birket El Sab =

Birket El Sabaa بركة السبع
- City
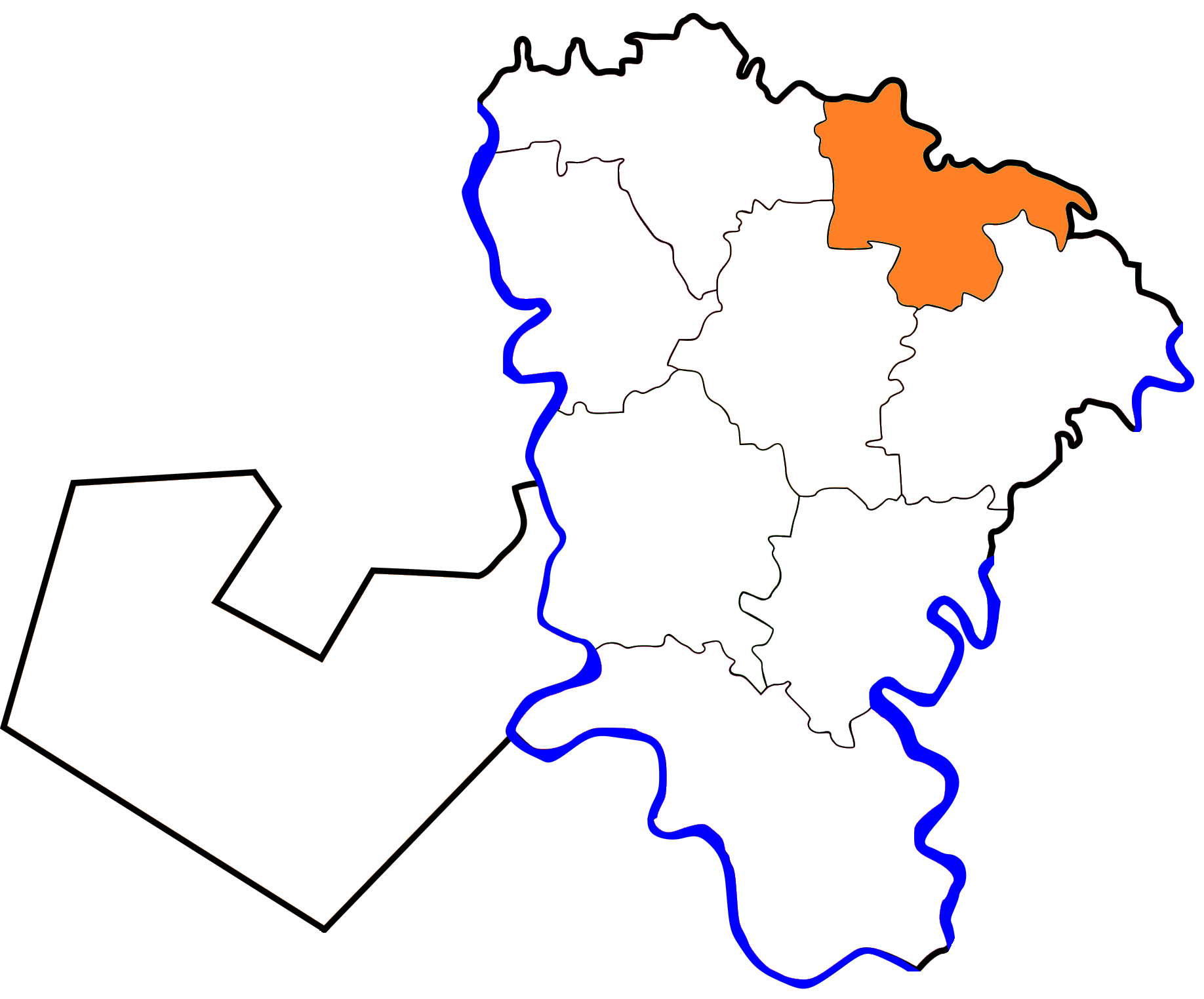
- Location in Monufia Governorate

- Location in Egypt
- Coordinates: 30.63385°N 31.084785°E
- Country: Egypt
- Governorate: Monufia

Area
  - Total: 119.5 km^{2} (46.1 sq mi)
- Elevation: 12 m (39 ft)

Population (2023)
  - Total: 340,131
  - Density: 2,846/km^{2} (7,372/sq mi)
- Time zone: UTC+2 (EET)
  - Summer (DST): UTC+3 (EEST)

Birket El Sabaa (Arabic: بركة السبع) is a city in the Monufia Governorate, Egypt.

== See also ==
- List of cities and towns in Egypt
