= Ahmed Ezz (businessman) =

Egyptian businessman and politician (born 1959)

Ahmed Ezz أحمد عز

Personal details
- Born: 12 January 1959 (age 67) Cairo, Egypt
- Party: National Democratic Party

Ahmed Ezz (Arabic: أحمد عز; born 12 January 1959) is an Egyptian businessman and one-time politician, the owner of Ezz Steel and the former chairman of Egypt's national assembly's budget committee. He was also the organizational secretary of the National Democratic Party of Egypt (NDP).

== Entrepreneurship ==
Ahmed Ezz was born to Egyptian lieutenant Abdel Aziz Ezz, and Palestinian Afaf Halawa, in 1959; and into a paternal family that had “traded building materials for generations” in Egypt, according to The Washington Post.

At the age of 19, Ezz joined the family business, Ezz Foreign Trade Co. founded in 1959, importing steel. In 1989 they went into the ceramic tiles industry, founding Al Ezz for Ceramics and Porcelain - ECAP, known for the Gemma ceramics brand. In 1994, Ezz founded Ezz Steel SAE, diversifying into manufacturing of rebars. Al-Ezz for Ceramics was listed on the Egyptian Exchange in 1998, and Ezz Steel a year later, while acquiring a 21.5% controlling stake that same year in the state-owned Alexandria National Iron & Steel Company, which was later renamed Al-Ezz Dekheila Steel Company - Alexandria EZDK. Today, Ezz owns controlling stakes in these companies through his Al Ezz Group Holding for Industry and Investment.

== Political career ==
Ezz went into politics in the 1990s, joining Hosni Mubarak's National Democratic Party, and becoming a major figure there, as the party secretary. Ezz ran for parliament representing the districts of Sadat-Monouf-Sers al-Liyan in Monofuyia, where his factories are, winning seats in 2000, 2005 and 2010. He was also elected head of the Planning and Budgeting Committee.

Ezz was elected twice as the head of the Arab Iron and Steel Union.

Prior to the revolution, opposition parties, other parliamentarians, and groups accused Ezz companies of monopolizing the steel industry in Egypt by holding more than 60 percent of the market share, describing it as an act that is backed up by the government, an act that was described by the active parliamentarian Aboul Ezz Al Hariri as "enhancing the proliferation of monopolies rather than fighting them". The groups mentioned are even blaming him of increasing the steel prices of as much as 70 percent. In response Ezz has told reporters that a competition law "would at least provide a legal framework preventing everyone from making accusations".

Ezz companies were investigated twice for monopoly by the Egyptian Competition Authority, both before and after the January 2011 Revolution. The companies were found "not guilty" of any monopolistic or anti-competition actions both times. Ahmed Ezz was also tried for profiteering and squandering public funds, in a case that was settled for $96 million in 2018.

Ezz was planning on running in the 2015 Egyptian parliamentary election as an independent in the Sadat City constituency, though he lost his appeal after he was disqualified from running. Another appeal was adjourned until 22 April 2015.

== Arrest and conviction ==
After the resignation of Hosni Mubarak due to the 2011 Egyptian revolution, on 17 February 2011 Ahmed Ezz was arrested, along with former interior minister Habib el-Adly, former minister of housing Ahmed Maghrabi and former tourism minister Zuheir Garana. News of the arrests spread quickly in the local Egyptian press. As a result, many fear that Ahmed Ezz will not receive a fair trial under a 1981 provision of Egyptian emergency law. Amr Bargisi, a senior partner with the Egyptian Union of Liberal Youth, told the Washington Times "I am afraid the divorce of wealth from power will probably not only lead to the unfair treatment of many businessmen and former politicians, but might also take Egypt in a direction that will be devastating for the economy and the prospects of democracy. Every businessman at the moment is a suspect of the revolutionary regime and the public. If this trend continues, we will see major capital flight from Egypt." Joe Stork, the deputy director of Human Rights Watch's Middle East and North Africa division, told the Washington Times of Mr. Ezz: "Certainly he, like anyone else, has his right to a fair trial. The judicial proceedings he is subjected to should meet fair-trial standards; he should know the accusations against him; he should be able to confront those who are accusing him."

In an 11 March letter from prison that was published on the Bikyamas website, Mr. Ezz refuted the charges against him and warned that "In this unprecedented time for the country, it is important to remember what our youth are calling for: freedom, fairness and democracy. My hope is that this commitment to a bright future for Egypt is not undermined at its first hurdle through a desire to find scapegoats. I truly hope I can at least depend on a full representation of the facts, due legal process and a fair trial."

On 5 October 2012, Ahmed Ezz was convicted of money laundering and sentenced to seven years in jail – plus a fine of 19.5bn Egyptian pounds (about $3bn; £2bn). These sentences were later appealed by Ahmed Ezz.

On 9 March 2018, the Cairo Criminal Court closed the case against Ahmed Ezz. The court also reversed a travel ban on him.
