= El Bagour =

El Bagour الباجور
- Town
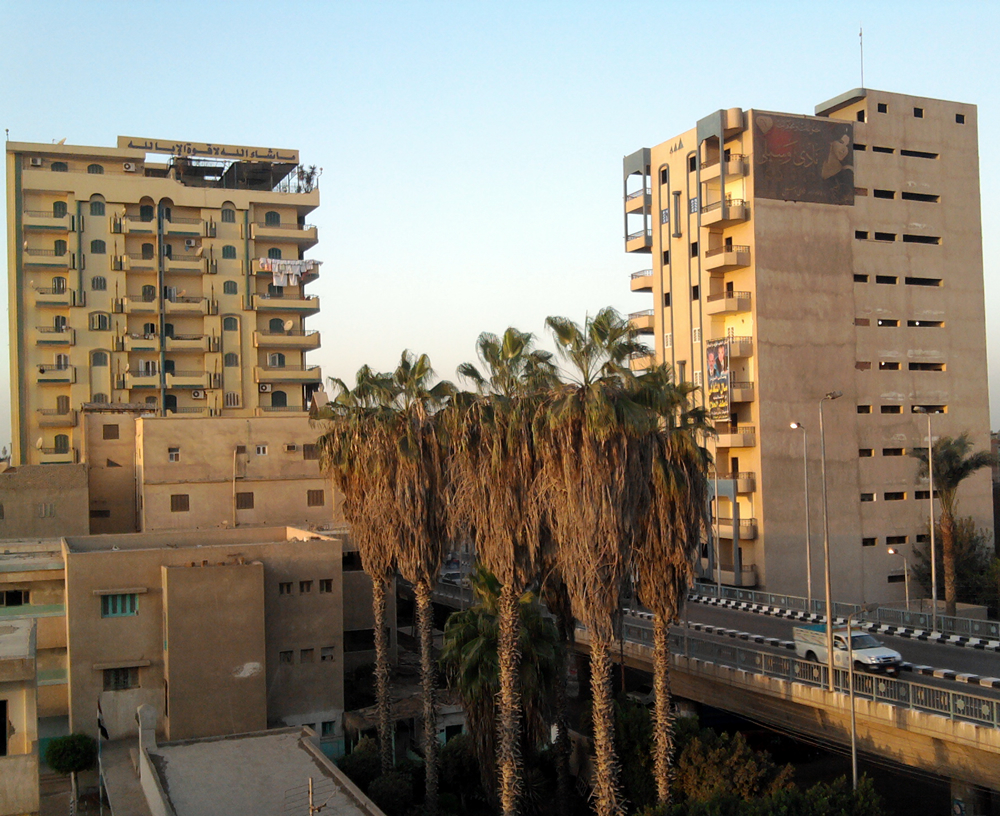

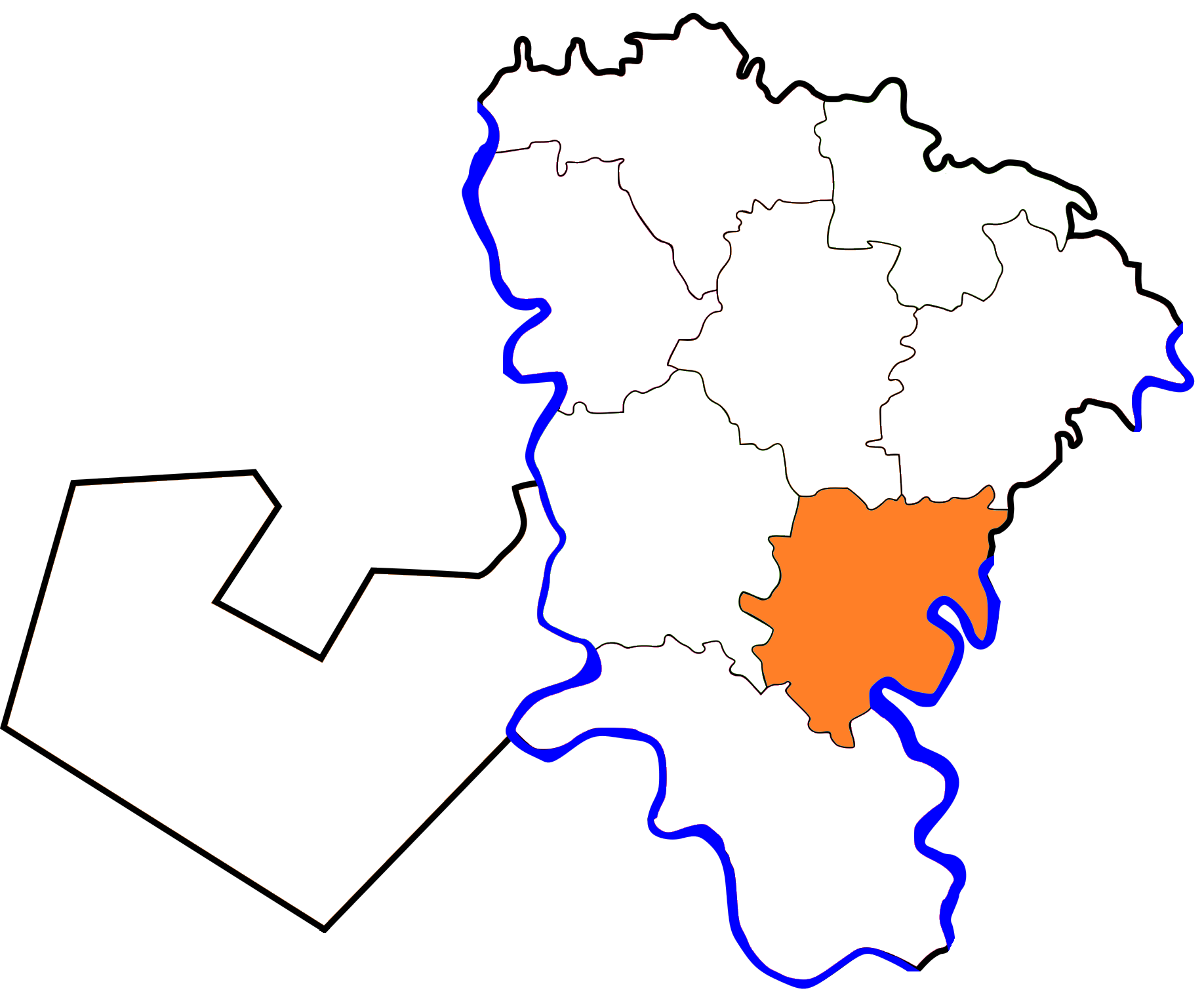
- Location in Monufia Governorate

- Location in Egypt
- Coordinates: 30.433282°N 31.056862°E
- Country: Egypt
- Governorate: Monufia

Area
  - Total: 9.74 km^{2} (3.76 sq mi)
- Elevation: 15 m (49 ft)

Population (2023)
  - Total: 65,320
  - Density: 6,710/km^{2} (17,400/sq mi)
- Demonym(s): Bagouri (Male, Arabic: باجوري) Bagouriyah (Female, Arabic: باجورية)
- Time zone: UTC+2 (EET)
  - Summer (DST): UTC+3 (EEST)

El Bagour (Arabic: الباجور pronounced [elbɑˈɡuːɾ]) is a town in northern Egypt. It is located in the Nile Delta in the Monufia Governorate. El Bagour has 48 surrounding villages.

== History ==
By 1783 it was known as Badjur, and was part of the Wilayat Menoufia , during which time it was part of the Ottoman Empire. The city is mentioned in Ali Pasha Mubarak's work al-Khitat al-Tawfiqiyya al-Jadida in the late 1880s, where he stated it was village in the Menoufia district within the Sobek region. He stated the village had 5 mosques with shrines, a chicken factory, orchards, and waterways. The total land area at the time was 1291 acres with a population of 1,998 people who were all Muslims, and the village was known for its manufacturing of licorice.

== Geography ==
El Bagour is located in the eastern part of Monufia Governorate, has borders with Benha to the east - 13 km, Menouf to the west - 15 km, Shibin El Kom to the north - 12 km and Ashmoun to the south - 20 km

=== Climate ===
Köppen-Geiger climate classification system classifies its climate as hot desert (BWh).

Climate data for El Bagour
Month	Jan	Feb	Mar	Apr	May	Jun	Jul	Aug	Sep	Oct	Nov	Dec	Year
Mean daily maximum °C (°F)	19.2 (66.6)	21 (70)	23.7 (74.7)	27.7 (81.9)	32 (90)	34.4 (93.9)	34.6 (94.3)	34.5 (94.1)	32.4 (90.3)	30.1 (86.2)	25.3 (77.5)	20.9 (69.6)	28.0 (82.4)
Daily mean °C (°F)	12.6 (54.7)	14 (57)	16.3 (61.3)	19.5 (67.1)	23.7 (74.7)	26.4 (79.5)	27.3 (81.1)	27.2 (81.0)	25.2 (77.4)	22.9 (73.2)	19 (66)	14.5 (58.1)	20.7 (69.3)
Mean daily minimum °C (°F)	6.1 (43.0)	7 (45)	9 (48)	11.4 (52.5)	15.4 (59.7)	18.4 (65.1)	20.1 (68.2)	19.9 (67.8)	18 (64)	15.7 (60.3)	12.8 (55.0)	8.2 (46.8)	13.5 (56.3)
Average precipitation mm (inches)	6 (0.2)	5 (0.2)	3 (0.1)	2 (0.1)	2 (0.1)	0 (0)	0 (0)	0 (0)	0 (0)	2 (0.1)	3 (0.1)	6 (0.2)	29 (1.1)
Source: Climate-Data.org (altitude: 16m)

== Population ==
According to the 2006 census, the population reached 304,420 citizens for the main city and surrounding villages. Isolated, the main city's population was about 50,000 citizens.

== Notable people ==
Ibrahim al-Bajuri, a follower of Imam Al-Shafiʽi and a theologian and scholar, was born in the village. Kamal El-Shazly, the former Minister of State for the People's Assembly and the Egyptian Shura Council, and also was the head of numerous specialized national councils before dying in 2010.

== Gallery ==
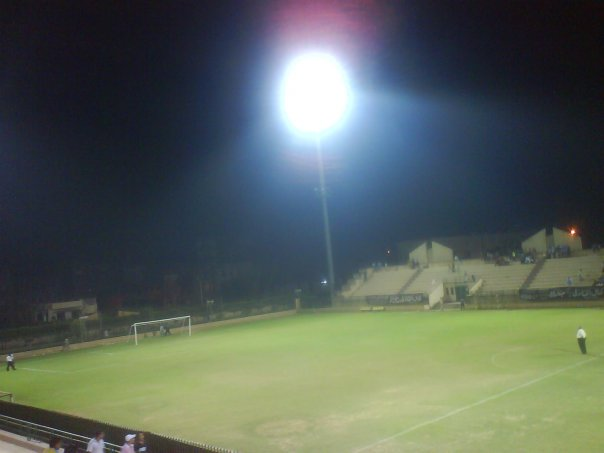
El Bagour Stadium

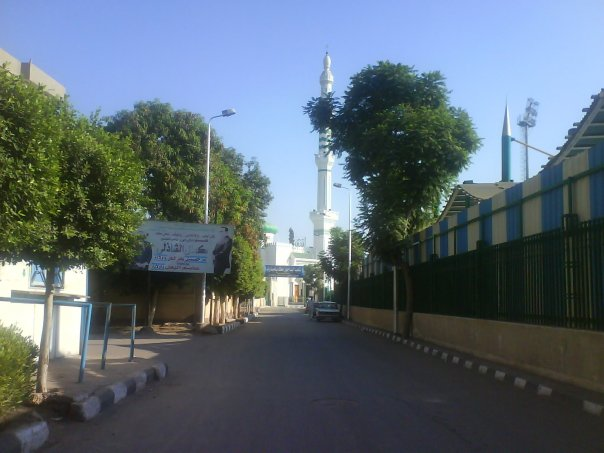
El Bagour Stadium St.

== See also ==
- List of cities and towns in Egypt
