= Ahmed Ezz =

Ahmed Ezz may refer to:

- Ahmed Ezz (actor) (born 1971), Egyptian actor
- Ahmed Ezz (businessman) (born 1959), Egyptian businessman and politician
