= Frederick Oakley Lasbrey =

English physician

Frederick Oakley Lasbrey (9 November 1872 – 30 December 1967) was an English physician associated with the Church Mission Society (CMS). He worked as medical superintendent at the CMS's Old Cairo Mission Hospital and was superintendent and secretary of the Edinburgh Medical Missionary Society. He published on hook worm disease or bilharzia. His death was recognized in the British Medical Journal in 1968.

== Early life ==
Frederick Oakley Lasbrey was born on November 9, 1872, in Uttoxeter, England. He was born into an English, Anglican family and was the son of Frederick William Lasbrey and Luoisa Jane Oakley. Lasbrey was a student at Uttoxeter Grammar School for a year, before spending three years at the Brewood Grammar School, and then four years at the Bedford Grammar School where he developed an interest in medicine.

At the age of 19, he matriculated at the University of Edinburgh Medical School and studied there from 1890 to 1897. During his time at Edinburgh, Lasbrey studied medicine and earned his M.B., Ch.B. there.

== Career ==
Lasbrey sought approval as a medical missionary from the Church Missionary Society, but was initially rejected. Instead, in November 1897 Lasbrey joined the British Mission to Deep Sea Fishermen. During this time, he served as a surgeon and also had his first experience as an Anglican missionary. He served under the Mission to Deep Sea Fishermen for just under a year before returning to England.

On November 3, 1898, Lasbrey was approved as a medical missionary by the CMS and in January 1899 they sent him to the Egypt Mission in Old Cairo. During his time in Egypt, he was expected to run the Old Cairo mission hospital, which had previously been directed by Francis John Harpur.

In October 1902, Lasbrey transferred to the Turkish Arabia Mission to Constantinople to obtain a Turkish diploma. During this time, he married Emily Waller and their daughter Violet was born. Within a year, in 1903, Lasbrey was re-transferred to the Old Cairo Mission to continue his work as superintendent. The following year saw the birth of his son in Cairo, but he died in November 1905.

During his time as superintendent, Lasbrey had to oversee the boys school, which held church services and evangelistic meetings, the girls school, and the clinic.

Emily died in 1906 and in 1908 Lasbrey married May Broadfoot, a nurse at the Cairo Hospital.

In 1928, Lasbrey established a medical mission in Mit Ghamr, Egypt, with a focus on fostering both medical care and Anglican evangelism, similar to the Old Cairo Mission.

After thirty years in Egypt, Lasbrey returned to Edinburgh in 1929 and accepted the position of Superintendent of the Edinburgh Medical Mission. After nine years with the Edinburgh Medical Mission, Lasbrey retired in 1938 and went into general practice at Wethersfield, Essex.

== Death ==
Lasbrey died on December 30, 1967, in Kepston, Bedfordshire.

== Publications ==
- A Case of Abdominal or Bilocular Hydrocele (British Medical Journal, 26 August 1916, p. 292)
- Notes on One Thousand Cases of Bilharziasis Treated by Antimony Tartrate (British Medical Journal, 26 February 1921, pp. 299-301)
- Treatment of Bilharziasis by Antimony Tartrate (British Medical Journal, 24 May 1924, pp. 907-8)
- The Livingstone Medical Mission (1936)
