= Quesna =

Quesna قويسنا
- City
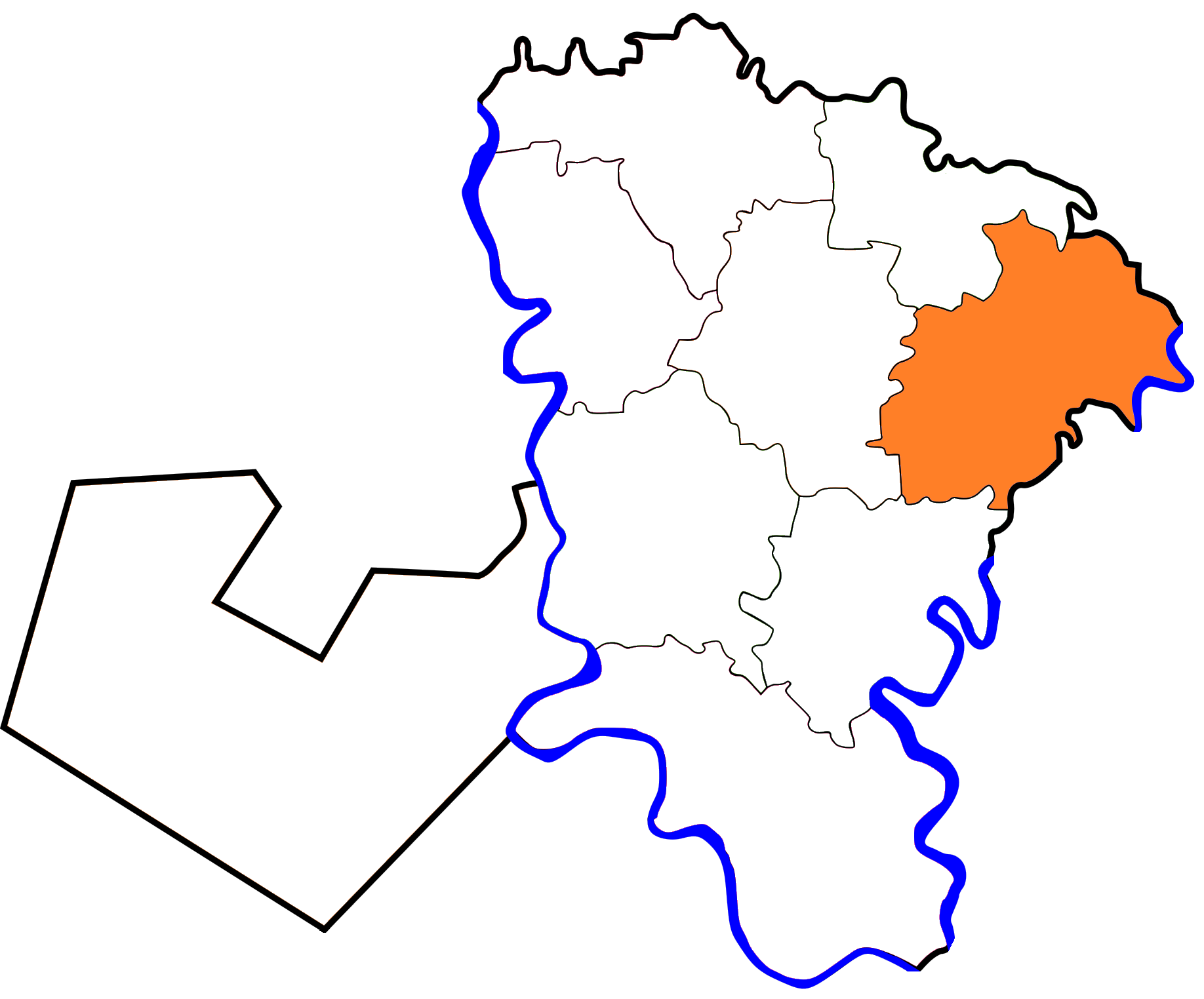
- Location in Monufia Governorate

- Location in Egypt
- Coordinates: 30.564183°N 31.157219°E
- Country: Egypt
- Governorate: Monufia

Area
  - Total: 210 km^{2} (81 sq mi)
- Time zone: UTC+2 (EET)
  - Summer (DST): UTC+3 (EEST)

Quesna pronounced Ewesna in Egyptian language (Egyptian Arabic: قويسنا pronounced [Ewesna]) is a city in Monufia Governorate, Egypt. It has an area of 49009 feddans (210 square kilometers).

The older name of the city is Ewesna (Egyptian Arabic: قوسينا).

== Notable people ==
- Tamer Abdel Raouf
