= Ezz Steel =

Egyptian company

Ezz Steel Co S.A.E. (حديد عز (ش.م.م
- Type: Société Anonyme Égyptienne
- Traded as: EGX: ESRS
- Industry: Steel
- Founded: 1994
- Founder: Ahmed Ezz
- Headquarters: Cairo, Egypt
- Key people: Hassan Nouh (managing director)
- Website: ezzsteel.com

Ezz Steel (Arabic: حديد عز) is the largest steel company in Egypt, the Middle East and North Africa Region. Headquartered in Cairo, Ezz Steel produces about 7 million metric tons of steel annually, and operates four steel plants in Alexandria, Sadat City, Suez, and 10th of Ramadan City.

== History ==
It was founded in 1994 by Ahmed Ezz, an entrepreneur and former National Democratic Party MP. In 1999, Ezz Steel was listed on the Egyptian Exchange under the ticker symbol ESRS, and has depositary receipts listed on the London Stock Exchange under the ticker symbol AEZD.

Ezz Steel managing director Paul Chekaiban succeeded Ahmed Ezz as company chairman in May 2011, and Farouk Ibrahim succeeded Ezz as chairman of Ezz Dekheila Steel. After the 25 January Revolution, Ezz had been tried for profiteering and squandering public funds by the Egyptian government, with charges dropped and the case settled for $96.8 million in 2018.

Ezz Steel was ranked 87th of the world biggest steel producers as per the 2015 World Steel Association Ranking with total production capacity of 3.2 million tons per year (2015), representing more than half of Egypt total annual production of 6 million tons.

Ezz Steel was listed as number 6 in Forbes' Top 50 Listed Companies in Egypt 2023. As of March 2023, Ahmed Ezz owned 60.71% of Ezz Steel through his Ezz Holding Company, while the Bank of New York Mellon held 5.82% of the company. Ezz's stake was 66% in early 2026. Ezz Steel remains headquartered in Cairo.

== Steel production ==
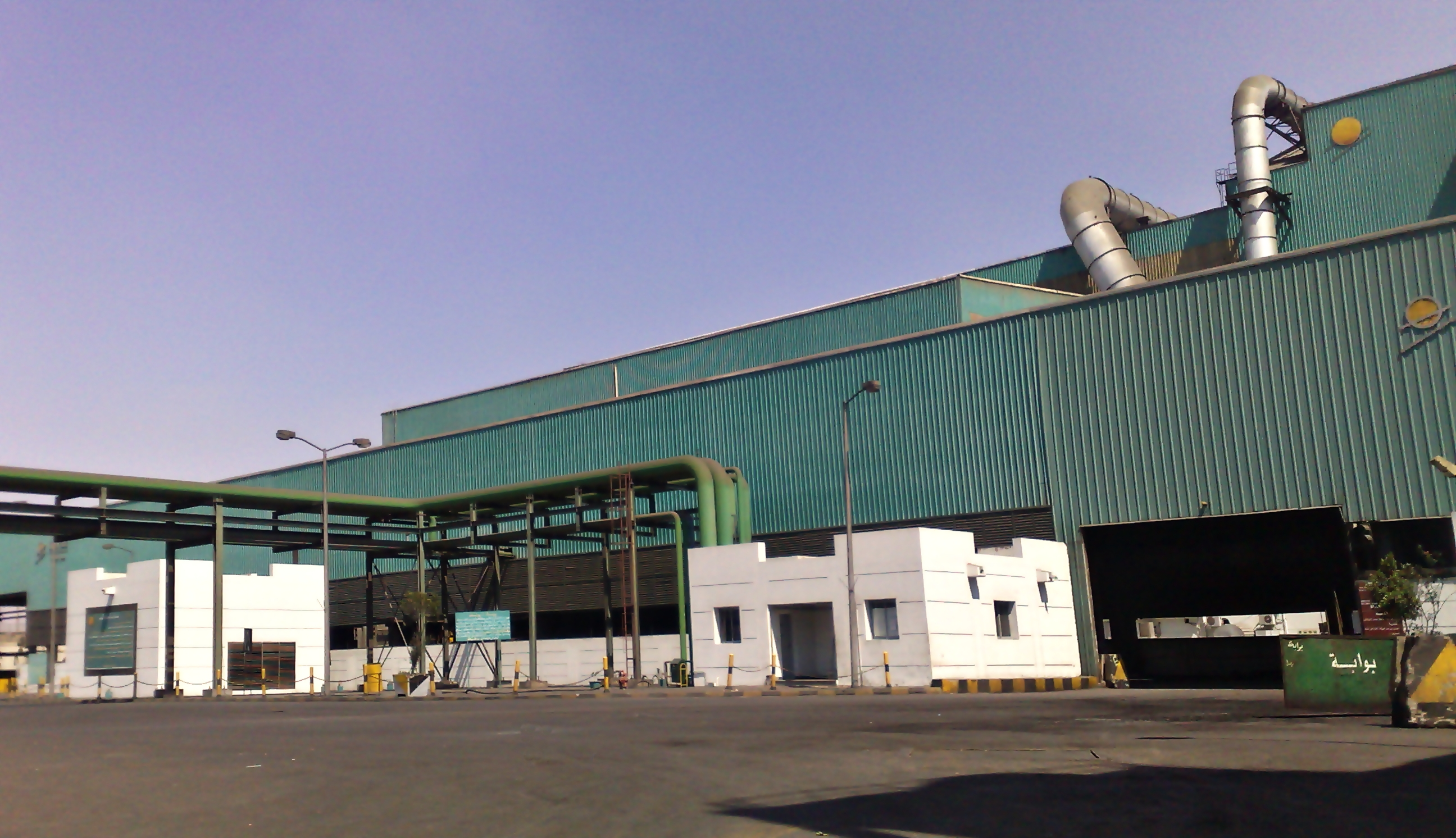
Ezz Steel in Sadat City

As of 2026, Ezz Steel operates four steel plants in Alexandria, Sadat City, Suez, and 10th of Ramadan City, and produces about 7 million metric tons of steel annually.

== Subsidiaries ==
In addition to its own production, Ezz Steel owns, or holds majority shares in a number of subsidiaries.

=== Al-Ezz Dekheila Steel Co. – Alexandria ===
Ezz Steel holds a majority stake in Al Ezz Dekheila Steel Co. – Alexandria (Arabic: العز الدخيلة للصلب – الاسكندرية). It was originally established in 1986 as the Alexandria National Iron and Steel Company (ANSDK) in 1982 by Egyptian public-sector institutions, Japanese institutions and global financial institutions, led by industrialist and former Minister of Industry, Ibrahim Salem Mohammedin, who also served as its chairman from 1982 until 2000. In 1995 it was listed on the EGX under the ticker IRAX, while Ezz Steel started buying stakes in the company in 1999.

As of March 2023, Ezz Steel held 64% of the company, while the Egyptian government owned 20% along with a number of state owned enterprises led by the National Investment Bank and the National Bank of Egypt with a combined 14%.

In July 2023, the Egyptian government sold its entire 31% stake in Ezz Steel subsidiary, Al Ezz Dekheila Steel Company to Ezz Steel for US$241 million. As Ezz Steel's interest increased above 90%, they announced that they would delist from the Egyptian Stock Exchange which requires a 10% free float.

=== Egyptian Steel Group ===
Ezz Steel indirectly owns 18% of the Egyptian Steel Group (مجموعة حديد المصريين), through Al Ezz Al Dekheila Steel since 2021. Egyptian Steel is a holding company based in Egypt, co-founded by industrial and media tycoon, and senator, Ahmed Abu Hashima in 2010 when he was 35 years old, along with Qatari royal, Shiekh Mohamed Abou Suhaim Al Thani, who was reported to hold 70% of the company. It manufactures 1.68 million tons of reinforced steel rebars and wire rods per year, giving it a 16% market share of the 9.8 million tons produced in 2022.

As a holding company it owns National Port Said Steel (NPSS), and IIC for Steel Plants Management which run four plants in Beni Suef, Ain Sokhna, Alexandria, and Port Said. In 2018, the Egyptian Armed Forces' National Services Project Organization (NSPO) bought an 82% stake in the company giving it effective control, and the ability to "ensure the stability of supply and prices, prevent monopolies in strategic sectors and goods, and support the work of the military institution in mega-projects." Three years later, Al Ezz Al Dekheila Steel bought out Abu Hashima's remaining 18% stake, ending his involvement with the company, and establishing a partnership between Ezz and the military.

=== Other holdings ===
As of 2013, Ezz Steel held a 64% direct and indirect stake in Al-Ezz Flat Steel Company (EFS) in Suez and a 99% of Al-Ezz Rolling Mills Company (ERM) in 10th of Ramadan City.

== See also ==
- List of steel producers
