= Ashmoun =

Ashmun أشمون
- City
- Nile Delta - Rosetta Branch, villages, towns, Ashmoun (from above)

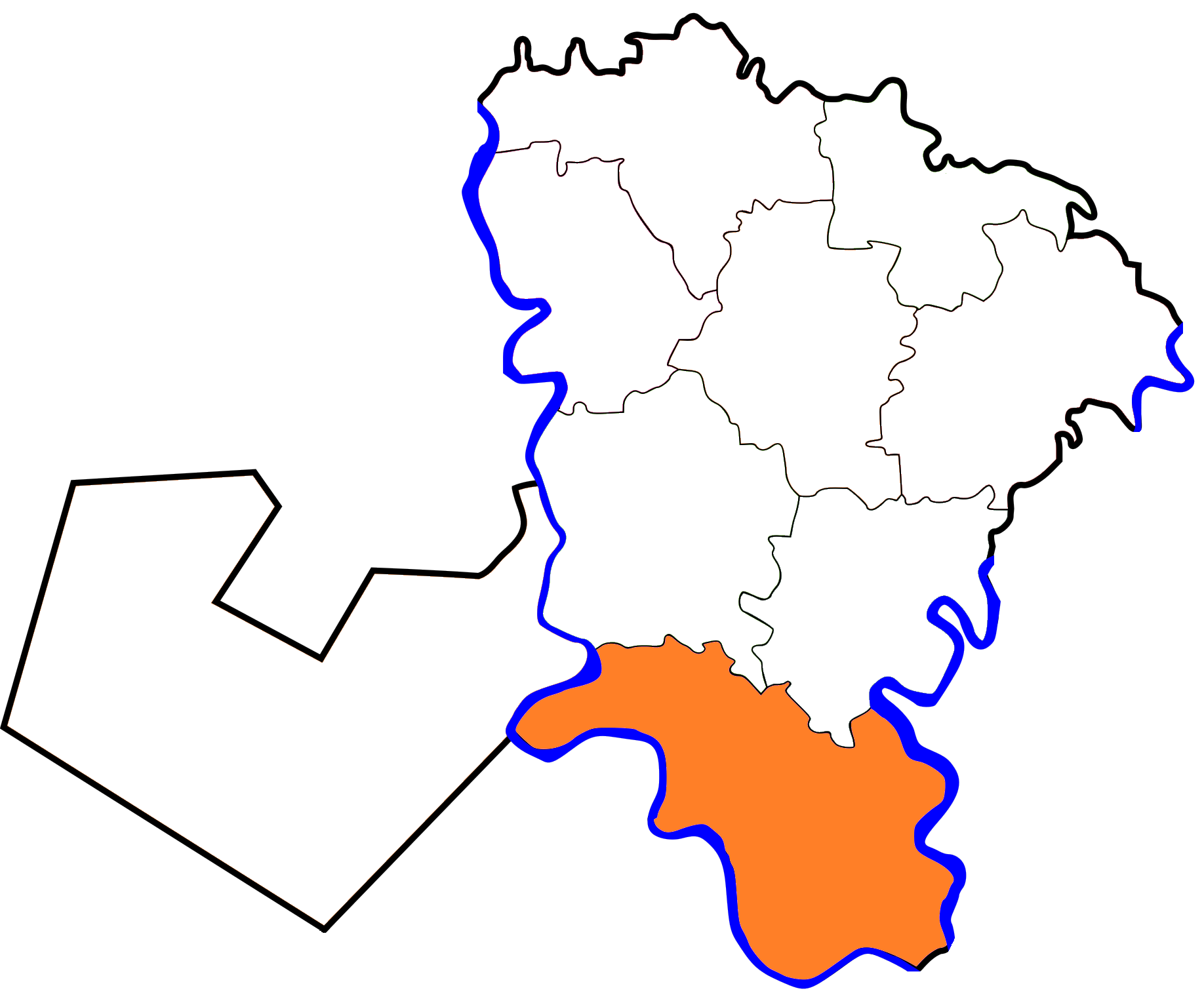
- Location in Monufia Governorate

- Location in Egypt
- Coordinates: 30.294054°N 31.034203°E
- Country: Egypt
- Governorate: Monufia

Area
  - Total: 315.6 km^{2} (121.9 sq mi)
- Elevation: 12 m (39 ft)

Population (2023)
  - Total: 926,301
  - Density: 2,935/km^{2} (7,602/sq mi)
- Time zone: UTC+2 (EET)
  - Summer (DST): UTC+3 (EEST)

Ashmoun (Arabic: أشمون) is a city in the south of Monufia Governorate, Egypt.

The city's Arabic name comes from Coptic Chmoumi (Coptic: ϭⲙⲟⲩⲙⲓ), of unclear etymology, that could be possibly related to a Coptic word for "spring, source" (Coptic: ⲙⲟⲩⲙⲓ). It was also known as Ashmoun Gerisat (Arabic: اشمون جريسات), a calque of Coptic: ϭⲙⲟⲩⲙⲓ ⲛⲧⲉ ⲡϯϩⲟⲧ, lit. 'Chmoumi of Ptihot', where Ptihot is a name of a nearby town, modern Gerays (Arabic: جريس).

== See also ==
- List of cities and towns in Egypt
