= Sadat City =

Sadat City مدينة السادات
- City
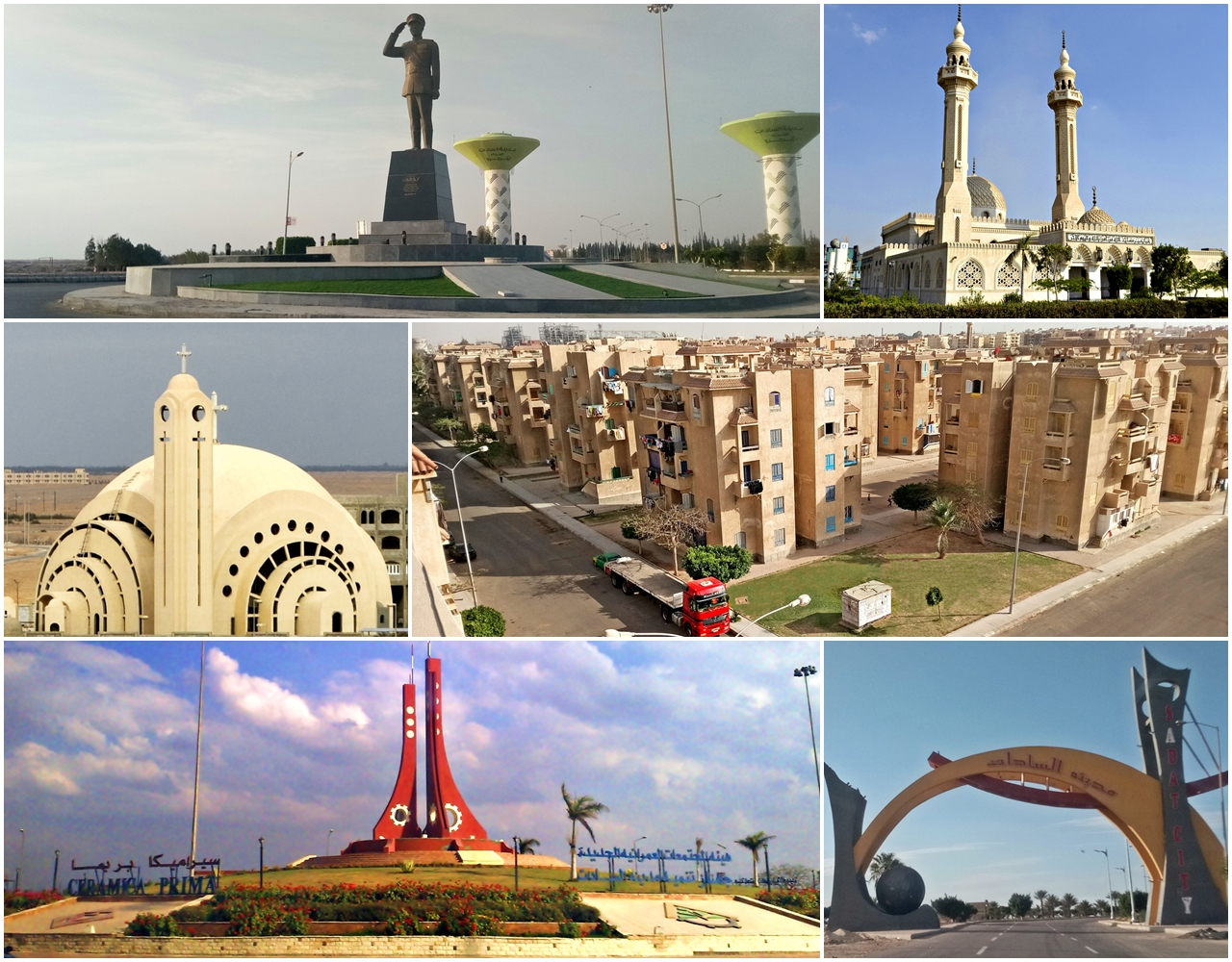
- Images from top, left to right: Anwar Sadat Satue, Abd El-Aziz Ezz Mosque, Virgin Mary Church, Twelfth residential area, The Unknown Soldier Memorial, Sadat City Gate

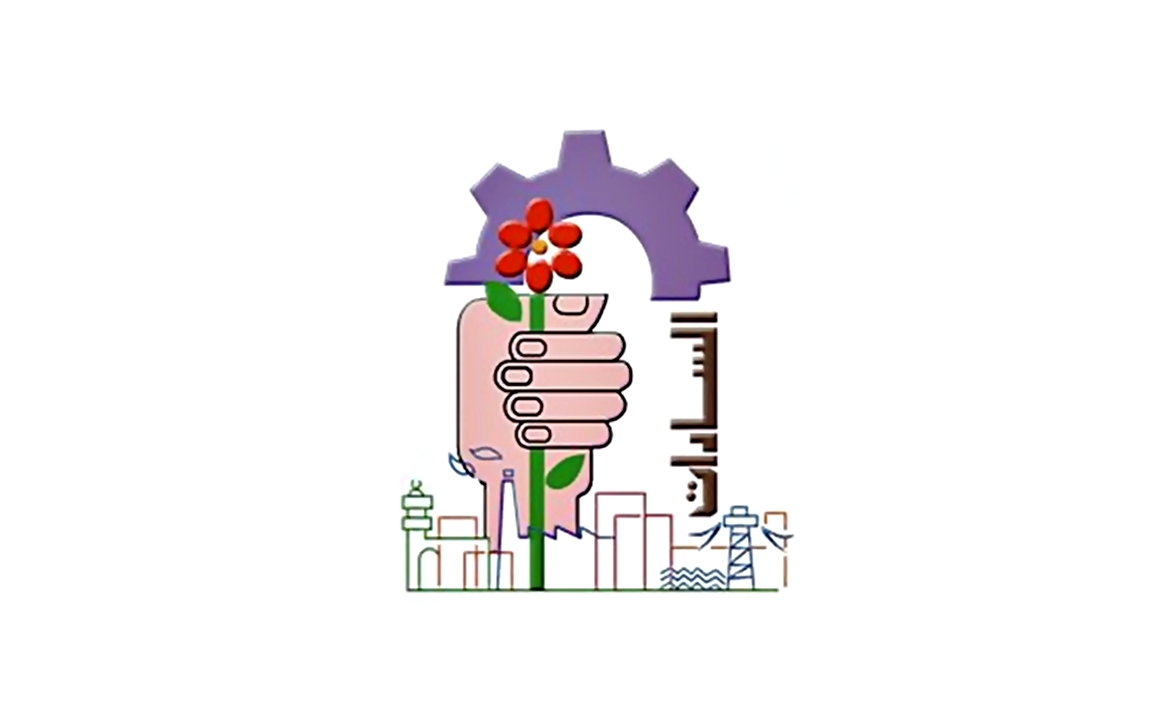
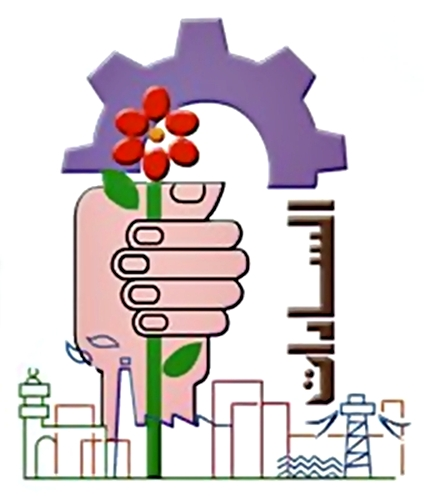
- Flag Seal

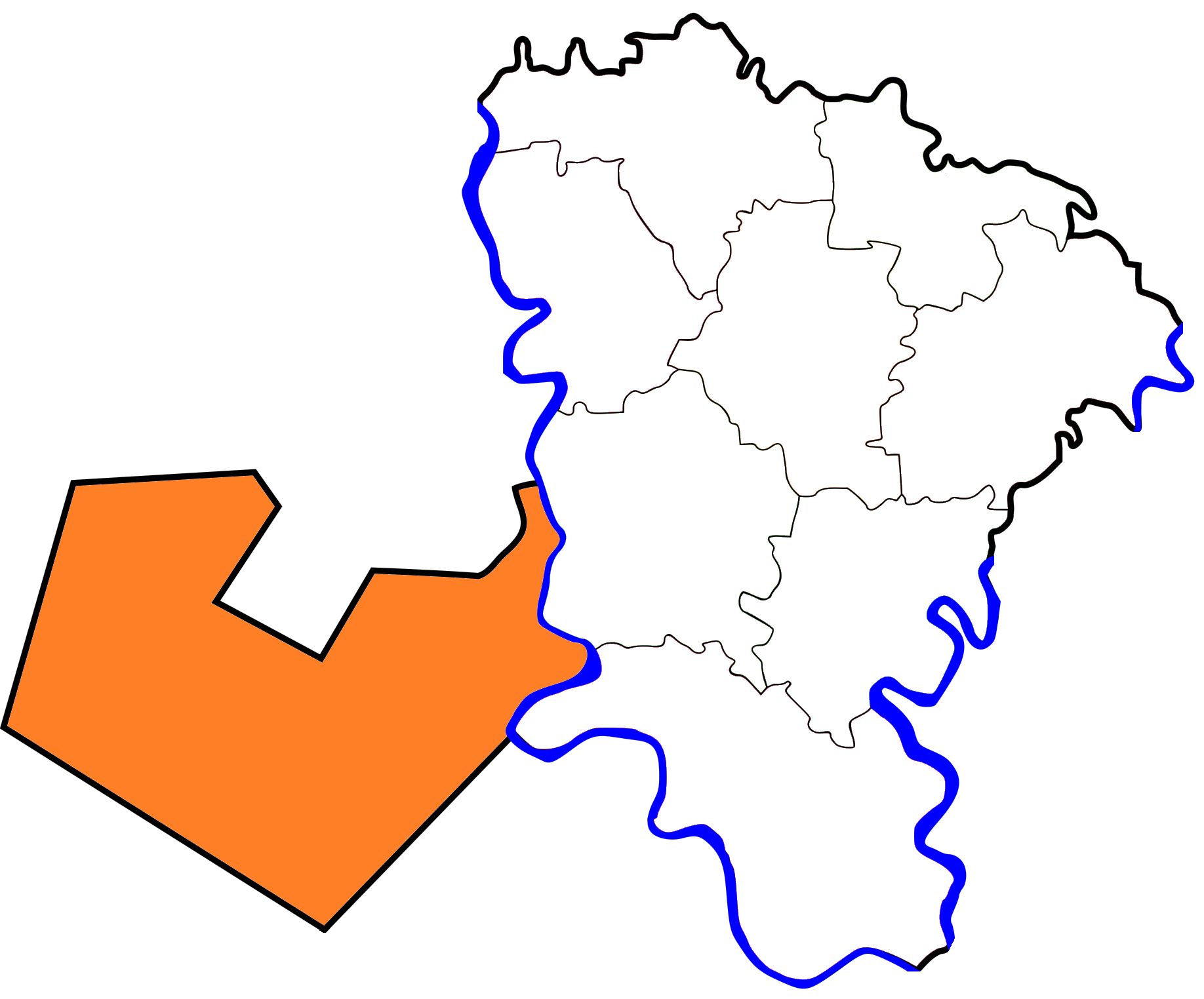
- Location in Monufia Governorate

- Location in Egypt
- Coordinates: 30.3811°N 30.5266°E
- Country: Egypt
- Governorate: Monufia
- Established: 1978

Area
  - Total: 241 sq mi (625 km^{2})

Population (2010)
  - Total: 79,000
- Time zone: UTC+2 (EET)
  - Summer (DST): UTC+3 (EEST)
- Area code: +20 (48)

Sadat City (Arabic: مدينة السادات Madīnat as-Sādāt Egyptian Arabic: [essæˈdæːt]) is a city in the Monufia Governorate, Egypt. It is named after late president Anwar Sadat. The city is located 94 kilometres (58 mi) northwest of Cairo. It is a first generation new urban community and one of the largest industrial cities in the country.

The city is surrounded by a 350 km^{2} green belt, which has earned it a place in the top ten list of environmentally friendly industrial cities in the Middle East.

== Industry ==
Sadat City has industry in a variety of sectors and in 2017, more land was slated and offered for industrial investment in Sadat.

== Climate ==
Köppen climate classification system classifies its climate as hot desert (BWh).

Climate data for Sadat
Month	Jan	Feb	Mar	Apr	May	Jun	Jul	Aug	Sep	Oct	Nov	Dec	Year
Mean daily maximum °C (°F)	19.5 (67.1)	20.7 (69.3)	23.7 (74.7)	27.6 (81.7)	32.3 (90.1)	34 (93)	34.3 (93.7)	34.4 (93.9)	32.3 (90.1)	29.8 (85.6)	25.1 (77.2)	20.5 (68.9)	27.9 (82.1)
Daily mean °C (°F)	13.2 (55.8)	14.2 (57.6)	16.7 (62.1)	19.7 (67.5)	24.4 (75.9)	26.4 (79.5)	27.3 (81.1)	27.4 (81.3)	25.6 (78.1)	22.8 (73.0)	18.8 (65.8)	14.3 (57.7)	20.9 (69.6)
Mean daily minimum °C (°F)	7 (45)	7.7 (45.9)	9.7 (49.5)	11.9 (53.4)	16.5 (61.7)	18.9 (66.0)	20.4 (68.7)	20.4 (68.7)	18.9 (66.0)	15.9 (60.6)	12.5 (54.5)	8.2 (46.8)	14.0 (57.2)
Average precipitation mm (inches)	5 (0.2)	6 (0.2)	2 (0.1)	2 (0.1)	2 (0.1)	0 (0)	0 (0)	0 (0)	0 (0)	2 (0.1)	10 (0.4)	11 (0.4)	40 (1.6)
Source: climate-data.org

== See also ==
- Beheira Governorate
- 6th of October City
- New Cairo
- New Borg El Arab
- Greater Cairo
