= Shibin El Kom =

Shibin El Kom شبين الكوم
- City
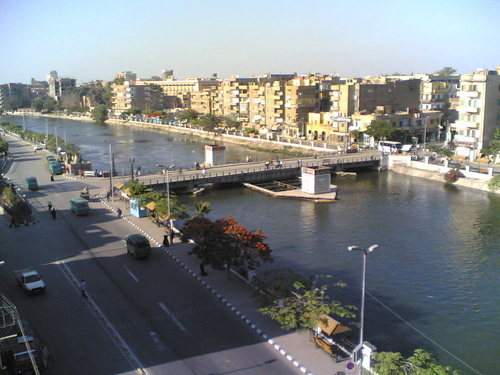
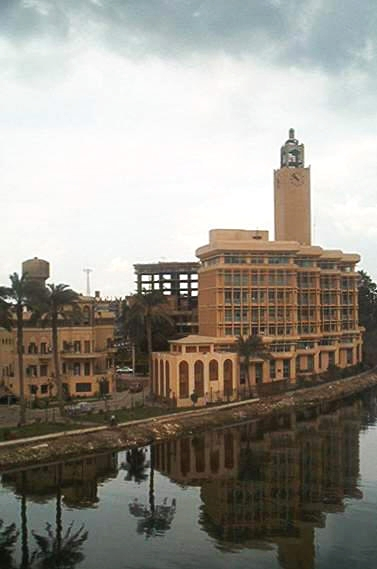
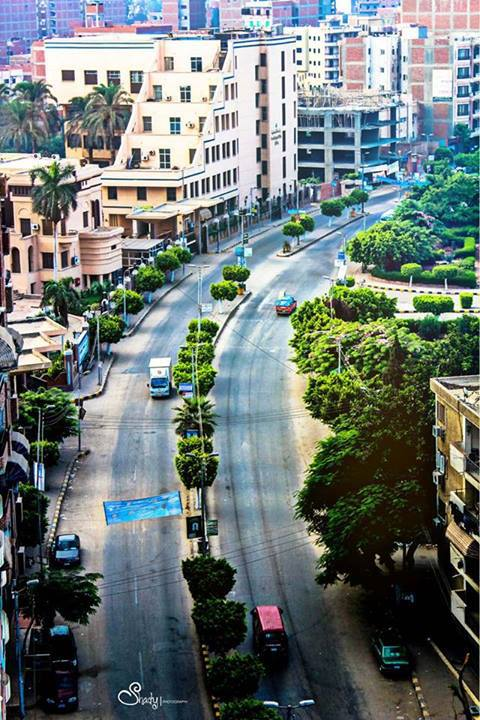
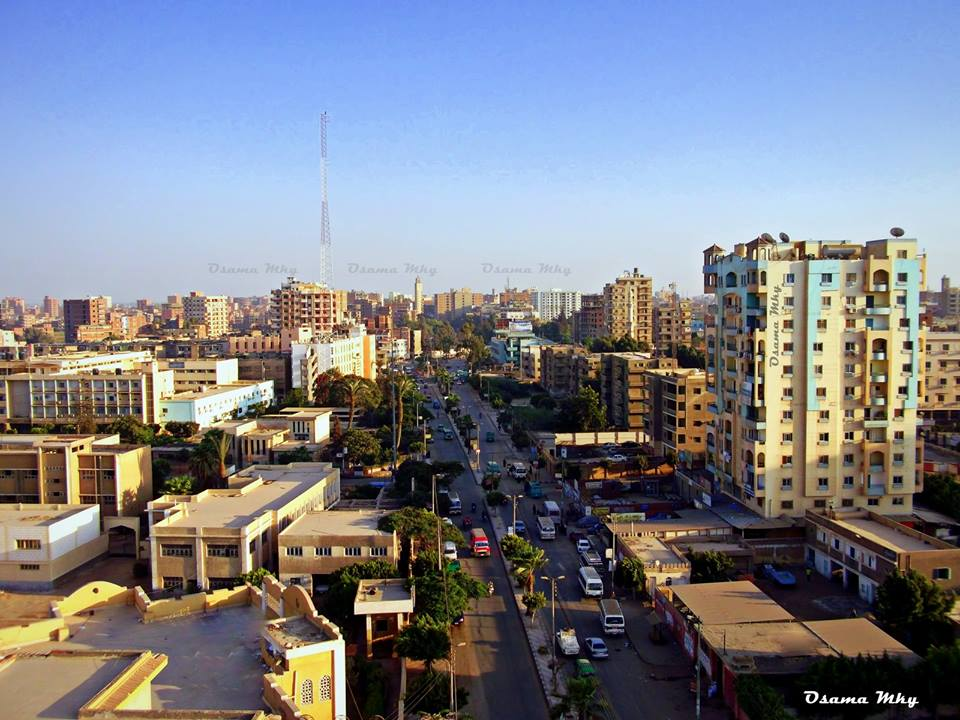
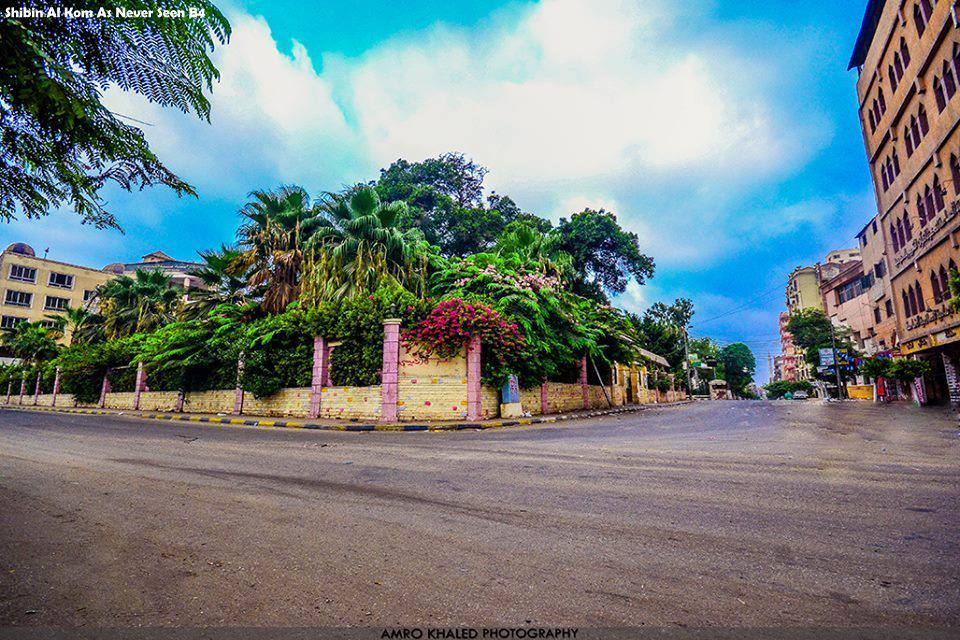
- The Nile banks Menoufia University Downtown Gamal Abdel Nasser street El-Aliaa Garden

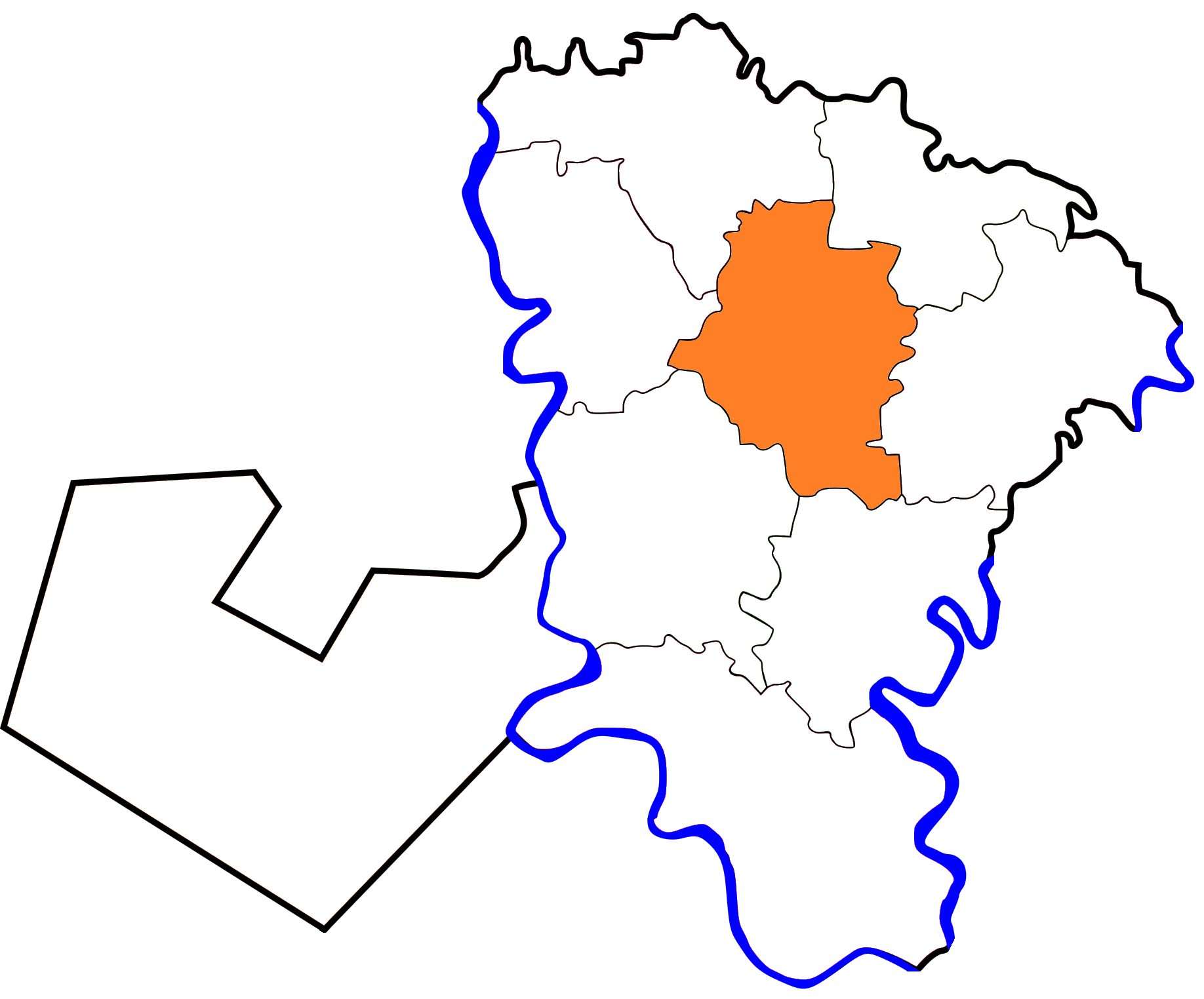
- Location in Monufia Governorate

- Location in Egypt
- Coordinates: 30°33′31″N 31°00′36″E
- Country: Egypt
- Governorate: Monufia

Area
  - City: 28.51 km^{2} (11.01 sq mi)
- Elevation: 23 m (75 ft)

Population (2021)
  - City: 267,945
  - Density: 9,398/km^{2} (24,340/sq mi)
  - Metro: 630,000
- Time zone: UTC+2 (EET)
  - Summer (DST): UTC+3 (EEST)
- Area code: (+20) 48

Shibin El Kom (pronounced [ʃɪˈbiːn elˈkoːm], colloquially shortened to Shibin) is a city in Egypt's Nile Delta, and the capital of the Monufia Governorate.

== Etymology ==
The city was previously known as Shaybin as-Ssarya (Arabic: شيبين السَّرِى) the first part of which Ramzi connects to Arabic: أشيب ʾašyab "grey-coloured, old". It appears to be a translation of Latin: veteranorum, lit. 'of veterans/old' akin to Shaybin al-Qasr (Arabic: شيبين القصر, lit. 'castle of the old', Latin: Scenae Veteranorum, lit. 'tents of veterans/old'), modern Shibin el-Qanatir, and possibly points out that Shibin el Kom used to be one of the Roman military camps in Lower Egypt.

== Facilities ==
While the city is not a new one, its infrastructure is being modernized. The most important central and local government offices are located in the city, as well as the main branches of Menoufia University. The city has several public and private schools, hospitals, a large stadium, a regional office of Telecom Egypt, organized trade unions, athletic teams, political parties and social organizations and a chamber of commerce.

== Climate ==
Shibin's climate is classified by Köppen-Geiger climate classification system as hot desert (BWh), as the rest of Egypt.

The highest record temperature was 48 °C (118 °F) recorded on June 7, 1961, while the lowest record temperature was −3 °C (27 °F) recorded on January 23, 1996.

Climate data for Shibin Al Kawm, Egypt
| Month | Jan | Feb | Mar | Apr | May | Jun | Jul | Aug | Sep | Oct | Nov | Dec | Year |
|---|---|---|---|---|---|---|---|---|---|---|---|---|---|
| Record high °C (°F) | 31 (88) | 37 (99) | 40 (104) | 46 (115) | 44 (111) | 48 (118) | 44 (111) | 44 (111) | 44 (111) | 41 (106) | 39 (102) | 33 (91) | 48 (118) |
| Mean daily maximum °C (°F) | 18.9 (66.0) | 21 (70) | 23.7 (74.7) | 27.3 (81.1) | 32.1 (89.8) | 34.5 (94.1) | 34.5 (94.1) | 34.5 (94.1) | 32.4 (90.3) | 29.9 (85.8) | 25 (77) | 20.5 (68.9) | 27.9 (82.2) |
| Daily mean °C (°F) | 12.2 (54.0) | 13.9 (57.0) | 16.2 (61.2) | 19.1 (66.4) | 23.7 (74.7) | 26.4 (79.5) | 27.1 (80.8) | 27.1 (80.8) | 25.1 (77.2) | 22.6 (72.7) | 18.7 (65.7) | 14.1 (57.4) | 20.5 (69.0) |
| Mean daily minimum °C (°F) | 5.6 (42.1) | 6.9 (44.4) | 8.8 (47.8) | 11 (52) | 15.3 (59.5) | 18.3 (64.9) | 19.7 (67.5) | 19.7 (67.5) | 17.8 (64.0) | 15.3 (59.5) | 12.5 (54.5) | 7.8 (46.0) | 13.2 (55.8) |
| Record low °C (°F) | −3 (27) | −2 (28) | 0 (32) | 3 (37) | 9 (48) | 10 (50) | 17 (63) | 14 (57) | 16 (61) | 10 (50) | 2 (36) | −2 (28) | −3 (27) |
| Average precipitation mm (inches) | 7 (0.3) | 6 (0.2) | 3 (0.1) | 2 (0.1) | 0 (0) | 0 (0) | 0 (0) | 0 (0) | 0 (0) | 2 (0.1) | 4 (0.2) | 8 (0.3) | 32 (1.3) |
Source 1: Climate-Data.org
Source 2: Voodoo Skies for record temperatures

== Museums ==
- Denshway Museum

== See also ==
- List of cities and towns in Egypt
