= Monufia Governorate =

Governorate of Egypt

Monufia Governorate Menoufia Governorate
- Governorate
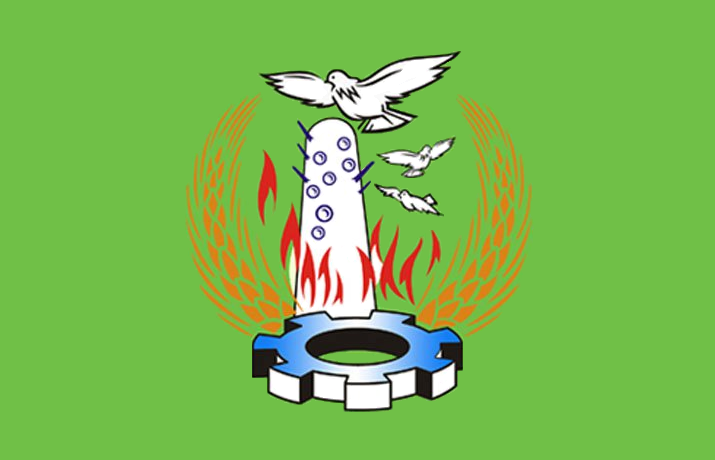
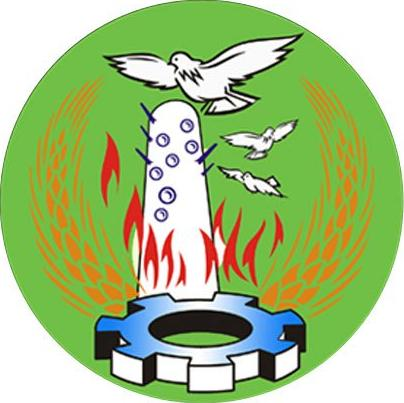
- Flag

- Monufia Governorate on the map of Egypt
- Coordinates: 30.52°N 30.99°E
- Country: Egypt
- Seat: Shibin El Kom

Government
  - Governor: Amr Mohamed Elghareeb

Area
  - Total: 2,499 km^{2} (965 sq mi)

Population (November 2023 estimate)
  - Total: 4,743,341
  - Density: 1,898/km^{2} (4,916/sq mi)

GDP
  - Total: EGP 157 billion (US$ 10 billion)
- Time zone: UTC+2 (EGY)
  - Summer (DST): UTC+3 (EEST)
- HDI (2021): 0.752 high · 6th
- Website: www.monofeya.gov.eg

Monufia or Menoufia (Arabic: محافظة المنوفية, romanized: Muḥāfaẓat al-Munūfiyya, IPA: [elmenoˈfejjæ, -mon-]) is one of the governorates of Egypt. Monufia’s name was derived from the Ancient Egyptian word Nafr, which means "The Good Land". It is located in the northern part of the country in the Nile Delta, to the south of Gharbia Governorate and to the north of Cairo. The governorate of Monufia is known for being the place of origin of four Egyptian presidents: Anwar Sadat, Hosni Mubarak, Adly Mansour, and Abdel Fattah el-Sisi. (Note: President Sisi was born in Gamalia, Cairo; and President Mansour was born in Cairo. Yet, their fathers were indeed from Menofia, while the first's mother was from Menofia as well, and the second's mother was from Beni Swaif. Presidents Sadat and Mubarak both were born in Menofia.) The governorate is named after Menouf, an ancient city which was the capital of the governorate until 1826. The current governor (as of 2018) is Said Mohammed Mohammed Abbas.

Monufia Governorate is home to several prominent educational institutions. Chief among them is Menoufia University, established by presidential decree in 1976. Another major institution is Sadat City University, which was founded by a 2013 presidential decree after having previously functioned as a branch of Menoufia University. The region also hosts Al-Riyada University for Science and Technology in Sadat City, Delta Technological University in Quesna, and Menoufia National University in Tukh Tanbisha. Additionally, there are faculties affiliated with Al-Azhar University in Shibin El Kom and Sadat City.

The primary economic activity in the governorate is agriculture. This is due to the fertile soil and the reliable availability of irrigation water from the Nile River in the region between its two branches. Agricultural activity also extends into the desert areas of Sadat City through land reclamation projects. A wide variety of cash crops, vegetables, and fruits are cultivated throughout the governorate. In addition to agriculture, the industrial sector plays a significant role in the local economy, especially following the incorporation of Sadat City, one of Egypt’s largest industrial centers. Other industrial zones are located in Quesna, along with light industries in Shibin El Kom.

In 2006, Menoufia Governorate ranked eleventh among Egyptian governorates located in the Nile Delta and Nile Valley in terms of quality of life and service standards. Regarding transportation, the governorate is traversed by two of Egypt’s major roads: the Cairo–Alexandria agricultural road and the Cairo–Alexandria desert road. However, many of the governorate’s other roads suffer from poor conditions and neglect, despite an extensive network of connections linking various parts of the region.

== Municipal divisions ==
Menoufia Governorate consists of nine administrative districts. Eight of these lie within the traditional borders of the governorate between the Rosetta and Damietta branches of the Nile, while one district, Sadat, is located west of the Rosetta branch. These districts include 10 cities, 70 rural local units, 315 affiliated villages, and 1,024 hamlets and sub-villages.

Municipal Divisions
Anglicized name	Native name	Arabic transliteration	Population (July 2017 Est.)	Type
El Bagour	مركز الباجور	Al-Bājūr	436,371	Markaz
Ashmoun	مركز أشمون	Ashmūn	920,871	Markaz
El Shohada	مركز الشهداء	Ash-Shuhadā'	377,133	Markaz
Birket el Sab	مركز بركة السبع	Birkat as-Sab'	338,111	Markaz
Sadat City	مركز و مدينة السادات	Madīnat as-Sādāt	196,666	Markaz
Menouf	قسم مدينة منوف	Minūf	129,179	Kism (fully urban)
Menouf	مركز منوف	Minūf	475,641	Markaz
Quweisna	مركز قويسنا	Quwaysinā	537,968	Markaz
Shibin el Kom	قسم شبين الكوم	Shibīn al-Kawm	275,347	Kism (fully urban)
Shibin el Kom	مركز شبين الكوم	Shibīn al-Kawm	516,990	Markaz
Sers El Lyan	قسم سرس الليان	Sirs al-Layyānah	80,327	Kism (fully urban)
Tala	مركز تلا	Talā	422,980	Markaz

== Population ==
=== Population Growth ===
In 1927, Menoufia’s population was around 1,077,894. By 1947, this had increased by 61,000 people, reflecting an annual growth rate of just 0.03%. Between 1947 and 1960, the population grew by another 29,000, with a slightly higher annual rate of 1.4%. The low growth during these periods is attributed to high mortality rates and significant out-migration.

Population growth accelerated significantly between 1960 and 1976, with an increase of 363,000 (an annual growth rate of 21.7%). Between 1976 and 1986, the population increased by 561,000, representing an annual growth rate of 3.3%, largely due to improvements in public health and a decline in death rates.

=== Population Distribution ===
Until the 1986 census, the population of Menoufia was relatively evenly distributed among its districts. In 1960, the proportion of residents in each administrative unit ranged from 7.7% to 17.8%; by 1976, this gap had widened slightly to 24%, and by 1986, ranged between 7.5% and 19%.

The inclusion of Sadat City as a new district in 1991 altered this distribution. At the time, it had a population of only 666 (in 1986), rising to 18,619 by 1996, yet it occupies 35.7% of the governorate’s area, making it the largest district by land and the smallest by population. Two districts emerged as the most populous: Ashmoun with 535,000 people and Shibin El Kom with 461,000.

Menoufia is part of the Delta region, which is characterized by a rural demographic profile. Urbanization is relatively low, with only 27.5% of the Delta's population living in urban areas. Menoufia’s urbanization rate is even lower—about one-third below the regional average and 116.1% lower than the national level—reflecting its strong rural character.

== Cities ==
The capital of the Monufia Governorate is the city of Shibin El Kom. The main cities of the governorate are Quesna, Tala, Bagour, Menouf, Ashmoun and Sers El Lyan. It is mainly an agricultural governorate.

- Shibin El Kom
- Menouf
- Ashmoun
- Sers El Lyan
- Tala
- El Bagour
- El Shohada
- Sadat City
- Quesna
- Birket El Sab
- Shanawan

== Industry ==
According to the 1998 census, Menoufia had 402 registered industrial establishments employing 15,002 workers, and 6,650 workshops employing 14,631 workers, totaling 29,633 workers in the industrial sector.

The food industry accounted for the largest share of establishments (26.1%), followed by engineering, building materials, refractories, and chemical and petrochemical industries (18.7%, 15.4%, and 14.7% respectively). In terms of employment, the textile industry was the largest, employing 83.6% of the industrial workforce, though it constituted only 9.5% of total establishments.

Industrial activity is concentrated in two zones: Sadat City and the Quesna Industrial Zone. Sadat City is particularly significant as a major industrial hub due to its capacity for expansion without affecting agricultural land, reduced risk of pollution, low land costs, strategic location between Cairo and Alexandria, proximity to the Nile Delta, and well-developed road infrastructure. These factors have made it an attractive destination for investment.

Menoufia is also known for its traditional industries, such as silk carpet weaving in the village of Saqiat Abu Shaara (exported internationally), and mother-of-pearl handicrafts in the village of Saqiat Al-Minqadi. Both are located in the Ashmoun District in southern Menoufia.

According to the Governing Authority for Investment and Free Zones (GAFI), the following industrial zones are located in Monufia:

Zone name
Mubarak Industrial Zone, Kafr El Raml
Sadat City Industrial Zone

== History ==
During the Pharaonic era, the southern Nile Delta was known as Netchem, meaning "Southern Neith." Its capital was Per-Zekaa, located at the site of present-day Zawyet Razin in the Monuf district. Under Roman rule, the area was divided into two administrative units: Conio, situated on Quesna Island between the Damietta Branch and the Bahr Shebeen canal, and Thou, encompassing the rest of the territory east of the Rosetta Branch. Several towns existed in the region during that time, including:

En Tenen or Bathnon, now the village of Al-Batanun north of Shibin El Kom, Mostai Mut, also known administratively as Masd and religiously as Hut-Tut-Ra, now the village of Mostai in the Quesna district, Pranet, currently known as Kom al-Kalba near Melig, Shalimi, now Ashlim in Quesna, which was a sacred city for the worship of the god Osiris, The modern name Menoufia derives from the city of Menouf, which was originally an ancient village known as Per-Nub ("House of Gold"). The name evolved over time: from Men-Nefer in ancient Egyptian, to Panoufis in Coptic, and Onouphis in Latin. During the Islamic era, the name became Manoufis, meaning "The Good Land," and was later simplified to Minufi, eventually becoming Menouf.

A notable event tied to the governorate’s history is the Battle of the Martyrs, which took place in the area now known as the Ashmoun district. It is said that Muhammad ibn al-Fadl ibn al-Abbas, a cousin of the Prophet Muhammad, died there while leading Islamic forces against Byzantine attempts to retake Egypt. With local support, a large number of companions and residents were martyred, leading to the area being named Shuhadaa (Martyrs) in their memory.

=== Administrative Evolution ===
During the Fatimid Caliphate, the region was administratively known as Al-Menoufiatayn, referring to Upper and Lower Menoufia, and included lands from the old Thou district. Under the Mamluk Sultanate, Sultan Al-Nasir Muhammad ibn Qalawun merged the Upper and Lower Menouf districts with Quesna Island (formerly Thou) into a single administrative unit named Menoufia Affairs in 1315. It was later called Wilayat Menoufia in 1527, Ma'muriyyat Menoufia in 1826, and Mudiriya Menoufia in 1833, until it became officially known as Menoufia Governorate in the 1960s.

During the French campaign in Egypt, the region witnessed several battles between the French and local residents, notably the Battle of Ghamreen in August 1798, which disrupted French communications to Cairo. In response, Napoleon Bonaparte established armed river fleets and built fortifications. Nevertheless, local fighters killed General Domartin and 14 of his men in 1799.

In 1826, Muhammad Ali Pasha moved the capital of the governorate from Menouf to the centrally located village of Shibin El Kom, which was then developed into a city. He divided the region into five districts:

- Shibin El Kom
- Menouf
- Ashmoun
- Quesna
- Tala

The emblem of Menoufia features a burning pigeon tower, symbolizing the famed pigeons of Denshawai and the infamous incident involving British officers. Two wheat ears represent agriculture, the green background symbolizes fertility, and a gear symbolizes industry.

In 1855, under Said Pasha, Menoufia was temporarily annexed to Gharbia Governorate, a decision repeated in 1886 by Khedive Tewfik, until it was reinstated as a separate governorate in 1887.

=== Denshawai Incident and National Identity ===
During the British occupation of Egypt, the Denshawai Incident of 1906 became a symbol of colonial injustice. British officers hunting pigeons in the village accidentally killed a woman and set a pigeon loft on fire. Local anger led to confrontation, during which one officer died from heatstroke. A swift and harsh military trial resulted in four villagers being hanged and 20 others imprisoned or flogged. Mustafa Kamil used the incident internationally to expose British abuses, and the prisoners were released in 1908. Menoufia commemorates June 13 as its national day in honor of the villagers’ resistance.

=== Administrative Developments in the Modern Era ===
Throughout the 20th century, new administrative divisions emerged:

In 1942, the Ashuhada district was created from lands taken from Tala and Shibin El Kom. In 1947, the El Bagour district was formed from villages belonging to Ashmoun, Menouf, Quesna, and Shibin El Kom. In 1955, five villages were transferred from Tala to Tanta and seven to Kafr El-Zayat following the establishment of the republic. In 1960, Berkat El Saba district was established from villages in Quesna, Tala, and Shibin El Kom. In 1975, under President Anwar Sadat, Sers El Layan was upgraded from a village to a city due to its importance and the presence of a UNESCO adult education center established in 1952. In 1991, Sadat City was transferred from Beheira Governorate to Menoufia by a presidential decree from Hosni Mubarak, with the intention of easing population pressure in the Delta. Though the decision was initially unpopular among its sparse population, the city became an independent district by 1995.

Currently, there are calls to designate Sadat City as the capital of a new governorate, independent from Menoufia, due to its geographical distance and weak administrative ties with the rest of the governorate. The proposed governorate would also include Wadi El Natrun, West Nubariya, El Tahrir Directorate, and Kom Hamada. Simultaneously, some residents of Beheira continue to demand Sadat City’s return to their governorate. In the final round of the 2012 Egyptian presidential election, Monufia had the highest voter turnout rate of all governorates (61.5%) as well as the most overwhelming support for candidate Ahmed Shafik (71.5%).

== Geography ==
Menoufia Governorate is situated between the two branches of the Nile River, the Rosetta and Damietta branches, in the southern part of the Nile Delta in northern Egypt. It takes the shape of a triangle, with its apex to the south and its base in the north. Initially, the governorate covered an area of 1,532.1 square kilometers, representing 1.5% of Egypt’s total area. In 1991, a presidential decree transferred the Sadat City district from Beheira Governorate to Menoufia, expanding its territory west of the Rosetta branch. This increased the governorate’s area to its current size of 2,543.03 square kilometers, accounting for 2.4% of Egypt's total land area.

The governorate stretches 64 kilometers from south to north, beginning at the apex of the Nile Delta and extending to its northern boundary with Gharbia Governorate. From east to west, it spans more than 80 kilometers, from the Damietta branch in the east to the far western edge of Sadat City, near the border with Beheira Governorate. Prior to the inclusion of Sadat City, the governorate's western extent reached only as far as the Rosetta branch. Since 1991, a section of this branch—from Kafr Dawud in the north to Khatatbah in the south—has become an internal watercourse.

=== Location ===
Menoufia Governorate is located in the southern Nile Delta in northern Egypt. It is bordered by Gharbia Governorate by the north, Qalyubia by the east, Beheira by the west, and Qalyubia and Giza by the west

=== Topography ===
The terrain of Menoufia generally slopes northward, a pattern indicating that sedimentation by the river occurs more rapidly in the central delta than along its eastern and western edges. This natural slope has influenced the design of the irrigation and drainage network, with canals flowing northward in alignment with the gradient, and various branches working together to irrigate agricultural basins.

The governorate’s terrain is largely flat and uniform, particularly in the area between the Damietta and Rosetta branches, where the average gradient is approximately 1:7000—steeper than the general delta gradient of 1:10000. This variation is attributed to the river depositing coarser materials first, followed by finer sediments as it flows northward, affecting the texture of the soil throughout the region.

West of the Rosetta branch lies the district of Sadat City, which includes a portion of the old floodplain characterized by low-lying terrain adjacent to the desert, with elevations ranging between 15 and 20 meters above sea level. Further west is a transitional floodplain-desert zone, with elevations between 30 and 75 meters. Sadat City itself is located to the west of this transitional area, with elevations ranging from 20 to 50 meters above sea level. The terrain in this area is gently undulating and follows the general slope of the western delta, descending from southeast to northwest, with minor variations along the eastern edge adjacent to the old floodplain lands between the two Nile branches.

== Agriculture ==
The governorate is famous for the production of crops like cotton, maize and wheat as well as vegetable crops such as potatoes and green beans of which a large part is exported. Agricultural land is irrigated with water from the Rosetta and Damietta branches of the Nile. Agriculture is generally the main activity of the population due to the fertile land in the Nile Delta.

== Stereotypes ==
Menoufis are the subject of numerous stereotypes among other Egyptians, with the most popular one being about how greedy they are. The reason for this particular stereotype is because of a story since the Mamluk Sultanate. During the Mamluk dynasty, a Mamluk killed someone, however the crime was witnessed by a Menoufi man, the Mamluk went to the Menoufi and fed him all kinds of meat and the best food ever, all the man had to do was bear false witness in front of the judge. On the day of judgement, the Menoufi told the truth to the judge and the Mamluk man was sentenced to jail, after that case, the phrase “المنوفي لا يوفي” (The Menoufi is not loyal) became popular.

== Education ==
Educational attainment levels in Menoufia Governorate vary by administrative district and population characteristics. According to the 1996 Egyptian census, the illiteracy rate stood at 36.7%. Male students generally outnumbered female students across most educational stages. A notable proportion of the population held primary, lower-intermediate, or intermediate qualifications, comprising 39.3% in Menoufia compared to 34.2% nationally.

Despite these figures exceeding the national average, the overall educational situation in the governorate was considered modest due to the high level of functional illiteracy, affecting over one-third of the population in 1996. This has posed a challenge to human development efforts. A significant number of families, particularly those with limited financial resources, tend to prioritize their children's education only up to the intermediate level, especially for girls, due to the high cost of higher education.

=== Higher Education ===
Menoufia Governorate is served by several higher education institutions. Menoufia University, the oldest public university in the governorate, was established by presidential decree in 1976. Originally composed of colleges affiliated with Tanta University in Shibin El Kom and Menouf, it now comprises 14 faculties and one institute, spread across Shibin El Kom, Menouf, and Ashmoun. These include:

- Faculty of Agriculture
- Faculty of Engineering
- Faculty of Education
- Faculty of Science
- Faculty of Commerce
- Faculty of Medicine
- Faculty of Arts
- Faculty of Law
- Faculty of Home Economics
- Faculty of Nursing
- Faculty of Computer and Information Science
- Faculty of Specific Education
- National Liver Institute, a unique institution in Africa and the Middle East

Previously, the university maintained a branch in Sadat City, which became an independent institution, Sadat City University, following a presidential decree in 2013. This university now includes eight faculties and research institutes:

- Faculty of Tourism and Hotels
- Faculty of Veterinary Medicine
- Faculty of Commerce
- Faculty of Law
- Faculty of Education
- Faculty of Physical Education (for men and women)
- Genetic Engineering and Biotechnology Research Institute
- Environmental Studies and Research Institute

Between its founding and the year 2000, Menoufia University had enrolled around 625,044 students, with males representing 66% and females 34%. Student numbers have fluctuated annually based on new admissions and the addition of new faculties. The number of teaching staff also grew significantly from 112 in the 1976–1977 academic year to 1,348 by 2000–2001—a 1104% increase, or an annual growth rate of approximately 44%. During that period, the average student-to-faculty ratio was about 42 to 1.

Other higher education institutions in the governorate include branches of Al-Azhar University in Shibin El Kom and Sadat City, as well as a branch of the American University in Cairo in Sadat City.

== Services ==
=== Human Development Index ===
Since 1996, the Egyptian government has monitored human development across the country, using indicators such as life expectancy, services, educational index, and GDP index. In 2003, Menoufia Governorate ranked eleventh among the governorates in the Nile Valley and Nile Delta. Among cities and districts, Sadat City led in human development, followed by Berket El Sabea, Quesna, Shibin El Kom, Menouf, Sers El Layan, El Bagour, Tala, and finally Ashmoun.

=== Drinking Water Services ===
Bahr Shebeen, a branch of the Monufia Canal derived from the Nile, is polluted and serves both irrigation and drinking water needs for Shibin El Kom and many nearby villages. Drinking water services are managed by an independent sector under the Ministry of Housing and Urban Development.

The number of drinking water subscribers in the governorate reached around 408,439. Shibin El Kom had the highest number of subscribers at 81,448, while Sadat District had the lowest at 7,981 due to its smaller population.

The best-served districts in drinking water access are Quesna, Shibin El Kom, Ashuhada, Berket El Sabea, Tala, and El Bagour, with Quesna reaching a service rate of 818 per 1,000 residents. The best-served villages are located in the north, within Shibin El Kom, Berket El Sabea, Tala, Ashuhada, and eastern El Bagour. The most underserved areas include villages in Ashmoun, Menouf, Quesna, and Sadat.

=== Healthcare ===
There are ten government general and central hospitals in Menoufia Governorate, one per city, serving an average of 230,000 residents each. Additionally, there are specialized hospitals focusing on specific illnesses, bringing the total to 30 hospitals.

Eye hospitals are located in Shibin El Kom and Menouf. Fever hospitals exist in Shibin El Kom, Menouf, Sadat City, Tala, Ashmoun, and Zawyet Al Naoura (in Ashuhada). Chest hospitals are located in Shibin El Kom, Menouf, and Zawyet Al Naoura.

In rural areas, there are 11 village hospitals and 127 primary healthcare units spread across 307 villages, with most units located in main villages serving as administrative centers. There are also 33 healthcare groups. A total of 220 doctors serve in these units, with an average ratio of one doctor per 10,000 people.

=== Telecommunications Services ===
The telephone network in Menoufia is generally well-distributed, though usage load varies across districts. As of 2001, Shibin El Kom had the highest service efficiency, followed by Berket El Sabea, Tala, Quesna, and El Bagour. Network load increases significantly in Ashmoun and Ashuhada and reaches its peak in Sadat District.

=== Sports and Recreation ===
Recreational and sports services in Menoufia are directed mainly at youth and include clubs, youth centers, and public sports squares, which vary by district. Shibin El Kom hosts 10 clubs out of the governorate’s total of 39 and is home to the only sports stadium in Menoufia, Menoufia Stadium. Menouf and Quesna each have six clubs, Sadat and Ashuhada three each, while Ashmoun, despite being one of the largest districts, has only two.

In terms of youth centers, Menouf ranks first with 55 out of 273 centers in the governorate. El Bagour comes next with 39 centers, while Sadat has the fewest, with only 7.

Each city also has its own local sports team, classified as playing in the second or third divisions. The most notable clubs are Gomhoriat Shebin SC, based in Shibin El Kom, and Nogoom FC, based in Sadat City.

== Transportation ==
=== Road Infrastructure ===
Menoufia Governorate has a Directorate of Roads, established by decision No. 153 in 1980, with its headquarters in Shibin El Kom. The governorate is traversed by two of the most significant national transport corridors in Egypt:

The Cairo–Alexandria Desert Road, which aligns with the southwestern boundary of Sadat City, located at the far west of the governorate. The Cairo–Alexandria Agricultural Road, which cuts through the governorate’s land in the districts of Quesna and Berket El Sabea in the northeast. These major roads connect Menoufia to three regional zones: Greater Cairo to the south, the rest of the Nile Delta to the north, and the Alexandria Governorate region to the northwest.

The Tamlay–Shibin El Kom road is a notable example of poor road conditions. It is narrow and suffers from lack of maintenance. This road is served by public buses operated under the "Monufia Bus Service," connecting Shibin El Kom to Sadat City.

In general, the internal road network in Menoufia (excluding Sadat) is in poor condition. Roads are often riddled with potholes and speed bumps, and are frequently narrowed by street vendors, workshops, stores, and market encroachments. These factors severely impact traffic flow and cause significant vehicle damage.

=== Road Connectivity ===
Shibin El Kom benefits from ten road and rail connections. Menouf and Berket El Sabea each have eight connections. El Bagour, Ashmoun, and Tala have six each. Quesna is served by five connections, and finally, Sadat and Ashuhada have four each.

Although the governorate has a high degree of accessibility to its peripheral districts, the central areas suffer from weak integration with the national road network due to the lack of comprehensive primary routes linking the internal districts to the country’s main transport corridors.

=== Other Transport Modes ===
Public taxis in the governorate are distinguishable by their green and yellow colors.

Due to the nature of the old floodplain landscape and the abundance of main canals in Menoufia, the potential for river transport exists. However, the network lacks sufficient east–west axes; most of the canals run north–south. The only former cross-regional water route linking the Damietta Branch with the Rosetta Branch was the Faraounia Canal, which spanned 37.25 km. With an average gradient of four meters from southeast to northwest, it began north of Al-Faraounia village near the Damietta branch, passed through Menouf, and ended in the village of Nader in Ashuhada. This canal was filled during the rule of Muhammad Ali of Egypt.

=== Availability of Transportation ===
Menoufia is served by various forms of land transport, including public buses operated by the governorate, linking its cities with one another and with nearby governorates. However, many of these services are of poor quality.

Transportation deficiencies are especially evident in Ashmoun and Menouf, with additional weak service zones appearing sporadically in the northern districts—Quesna, Berket El Sabea, Tala, and Ashuhada—as well as in Shibin El Kom. In Sadat City, internal connectivity with the rest of Menoufia is limited, although connections to distant governorates such as Cairo, Giza, Beheira, Alexandria, and Dakahlia are relatively strong.

== Culture ==
Menoufia Governorate has a Directorate of Culture that oversees various cultural services and events, such as festivals, art exhibitions, and public celebrations. The governorate houses three main cultural palaces—in Sadat City, Denshawai, and Shibin El Kom—alongside 15 smaller cultural centers spread across towns and villages, and 22 libraries, most of which are attached to these cultural institutions.

Musical and performance arts are relatively recent developments in the governorate. There are three official music ensembles:

The Menoufia Folk Arts Troupe, established in 2000, includes 45 members and a 15-person musical band The Menoufia Traditional Instruments Ensemble, founded in 1991 in Shibin El Kom, mainly performs locally at national and religious events The Menoufia Arab Music Ensemble, established in 1992, performs classical Arabic music forms such as qasida, muwashshah, monologue, duet, taqtuqa, national songs, and folk heritage songs. It performs mostly in local venues but has also participated in events in Tunisia, as part of the twinning agreement between Sousse and Shibin El Kom The governorate is home to two museums:

The Denshawai Museum in the village of Denshawai (Ashuhada District), commemorates the 1906 Denshawai incident involving local resistance to British soldiers. The museum features statues, photographs, and historical displays related to the event The Mit Abu El Kom Museum, located in the birthplace of former President of Egypt Anwar Sadat, includes personal belongings and part of his residence, built in 1962. The site also contains a guesthouse where Sadat hosted international and local dignitaries

== Notable residents ==
- St. Pishoy
- Anwar Sadat (1918–1981)
- Hosni Mubarak (1928–2020).
- Omar Fayed (b. 2003), Fenerbahçe football player
- Naguib El-Helaly Gohar (1944–2015), professor and university president

== Projects ==
In 1981, the Basic Village Service Program (BVS), under the auspices of USAID, had several water, road, and other projects, going on in several markazes in the Monufia Governorate.

In 2018, the National Agricultural Animal Health Services (NAAHS) was formed by the Ministry of Agriculture in order to care for the rising number of infected horses and donkeys in the Shibin El-Kom area. This was sparked by the tragedy.

Menoufia University is one of the most important educational institutions in the governorate. It was established by a presidential decree in 1976.
