= 2023–24 in Egyptian football =

2023–24 football season in Egyptian football

Football in Egypt
- Season: 2023–24

Men's football
- Premier League: Al Ahly
- Second Division A: Petrojet
- Egypt Cup: Pyramids
- League Cup: Ceramica Cleopatra
- Super Cup: Al Ahly

Women's football
- Women's Premier League: Tutankhamun
- Women's Cup: Tutankhamun
- Women's Super Cup: Wadi Degla

This article summarizes the activity of Egyptian football during the 2023–24 season, including domestic and international tournaments for senior and youth teams.

== National teams ==
=== Men ===
==== Senior ====
===== Friendlies =====
12 September 2023	Egypt	1–3	Tunisia	Cairo, Egypt
20:00 CAST (UTC+3)	Kamal 34'	Report	Laïdouni 3'; H. Fathy 8' (o.g.); Rafia 90+5'	Stadium: 30 June Stadium; Referee: Ammar Ashkanani (Kuwait)

12 October 2023	Egypt	1–0	Zambia	Al Ain, United Arab Emirates
20:00 GST (UTC+4)	H. Fathy 90+4'	Report		Stadium: Hazza bin Zayed Stadium; Referee: Ahmed Issa (Kuwait)

16 October 2023	Egypt	1–1	Algeria	Al Ain, United Arab Emirates
20:00 GST (UTC+4)	H. Fathy 62'	Report	Slimani 90+3'	Stadium: Hazza bin Zayed Stadium; Referee: Yahya Al Mulla (United Arab Emirates)

7 January 2024	Egypt	2–0	Tanzania	Cairo, Egypt
18:00 CAT (UTC+2)	Trézéguet 32'; Manula 73' (o.g.)	Report		Stadium: Cairo International Stadium; Referee: Hashem Al Ibrahim (Kuwait)

22 March 2024 2024 ACUD Cup Semi-finals	Egypt	1–0	New Zealand	New Administrative Capital, Egypt
22:00 CAT (UTC+2)	Mostafa 29' (pen.)	Report		Stadium: New Administrative Capital Stadium; Attendance: 30,200; Referee: Clement Franklin Kpan (Ivory Coast)

26 March 2024 2024 ACUD Cup Final	Egypt	2–4	Croatia	New Administrative Capital, Egypt
22:00 CAT (UTC+2)	Rabia 6'; Abdel Monem 90+4'	Report	Vlašić 21'; Petković 57'; Kramarić 77'; Majer 86'	Stadium: New Administrative Capital Stadium; Referee: Adalbert Diouf (Senegal)

===== 2023 Africa Cup of Nations qualification =====
Pos	Team	Pld	W	D	L	GF	GA	GD	Pts	Qualification	Egypt	Guinea	Malawi	Ethiopia
1	Egypt	6	5	0	1	10	3	+7	15	Final tournament	—	1–0	2–0	1–0
2	Guinea	6	3	1	2	9	7	+2	10	Final tournament	1–2	—	1–0	2–0
3	Malawi	6	1	2	3	4	10	−6	5		0–4	2–2	—	2–1
4	Ethiopia	6	1	1	4	5	8	−3	4		2–0	2–3	0–0	—

Source: CAF

8 September 2023 6	Egypt	1–0	Ethiopia	Cairo, Egypt
19:00 CAST (UTC+3)	M. Fathi 37'	Report		Stadium: 30 June Stadium; Referee: Patrice Mebiame (Gabon)

===== 2023 Africa Cup of Nations =====
Group B

Pos	Team	Pld	W	D	L	GF	GA	GD	Pts	Qualification
1	Cape Verde	3	2	1	0	7	3	+4	7	Advance to knockout stage
2	Egypt	3	0	3	0	6	6	0	3	Advance to knockout stage
3	Ghana	3	0	2	1	5	6	−1	2 (Note: Tied on head-to-head points. Overall goal difference: Ghana −1, Mozambique −3.)	
4	Mozambique	3	0	2	1	4	7	−3	2	

Source: CAF
Notes:

14 January 2024 1	Egypt	2–2	Mozambique	Abidjan, Ivory Coast
17:00 GMT (UTC±0)	Mostafa Mohamed 2'; Salah 90+7' (pen.)	Report	Witi 56'; Clésio 58'	Stadium: Felix Houphouet Boigny Stadium; Attendance: 11,933; Referee: Dahane Beida (Mauritania)

18 January 2024 2	Egypt	2–2	Ghana	Abidjan, Ivory Coast
20:00 GMT (UTC±0)	Marmoush 69'; Mostafa 74'	Report	Kudus 45+3', 71'	Stadium: Felix Houphouet Boigny Stadium; Attendance: 20,808; Referee: Pierre Atcho (Gabon)

22 January 2024 3	Cape Verde	2–2	Egypt	Abidjan, Ivory Coast
20:00 GMT (UTC±0)	G. Tavares 45+1'; Teixeira 90+9'	Report	Trézéguet 50'; Mostafa 90+3'	Stadium: Felix Houphouet Boigny Stadium; Attendance: 15,650; Referee: Alhadi Allaou Mahamat (Chad)

Knockout stage

28 January 2024 Round of 16	Egypt	1–1 (a.e.t.) (7–8 p)	DR Congo	San Pédro, Ivory Coast
20:00 GMT (UTC±0)	Mostafa 45+1' (pen.)	Report	Elia 37'	Stadium: Laurent Pokou Stadium; Attendance: 12,342; Referee: Abongile Tom (South Africa)
	Penalties
	Abdel Monem (penalty scored); Mostafa (penalty missed); Marmoush (penalty scored); Kamal (penalty scored); Hany (penalty scored); Hegazi (penalty scored); M. Fathi (penalty scored); Hamada (penalty scored); Abou Gabal (penalty missed)		(penalty scored) Moutoussamy; (penalty missed) Masuaku; (penalty scored) Dianagana; (penalty scored) Silas; (penalty scored) Tshibola; (penalty scored) Kalulu; (penalty scored) Mbemba; (penalty scored) Inonga Baka; (penalty scored) Mpasi

===== 2026 FIFA World Cup qualification =====
Pos	Team	Pld	W	D	L	GF	GA	GD	Pts	Qualification	(Egypt)	(Burkina Faso)	(Sierra Leone)	(Guinea-Bissau)	(Ethiopia)	(Djibouti)
1	Egypt	10	8	2	0	20	2	+18	26	2026 FIFA World Cup	—	2–1	1–0	1–0	2–0	6–0
2	Burkina Faso	10	6	3	1	23	8	+15	21		0–0	—	2–2	1–1	3–1	4–1
3	Sierra Leone	10	4	3	3	12	10	+2	15		0–2	0–1	—	3–1	2–0	2–1
4	Guinea-Bissau	10	2	4	4	8	10	−2	10		1–1	1–2	1–1	—	0–0	2–0
5	Ethiopia	10	2	3	5	9	14	−5	9		0–2	0–3	0–0	1–0	—	6–1
6	Djibouti	10	0	1	9	5	33	−28	1		0–3	0–6	1–2	0–1	1–1	—

Source: FIFA

16 November 2023 1	Egypt	6–0	Djibouti	Cairo, Egypt
18:00 CAT (UTC+2)	Salah 17', 22' (pen.), 48', 69'; Mostafa 73'; Trézéguet 89'	Report		Stadium: Cairo International Stadium; Attendance: 6,000; Referee: Jelly Chavani (South Africa)

19 November 2023 2	Sierra Leone	0–2	Egypt	Paynesville, Liberia
16:00 GMT (UTC±0)		Report	Trézéguet 18', 62'	Stadium: Samuel Kanyon Doe Sports Complex; Attendance: 8,916; Referee: Jean-Jacques Ndala Ngambo (DR Congo)
Note: The match took place at Samuel Kanyon Doe Sports Complex in Paynesville, Liberia, instead of Siaka Stevens National Stadium in Freetown, Sierra Leone.

6 June 2024 3	Egypt	2–1	Burkina Faso	Cairo, Egypt
22:00 CAST (UTC+3)	Trézéguet 3', 8'	Report	L. Traoré 57'	Stadium: Cairo International Stadium; Attendance: 65,000; Referee: Peter Waweru (Kenya)

10 June 2024 4	Guinea-Bissau	1–1	Egypt	Bissau, Guinea-Bissau
16:00 GMT (UTC±0)	Baldé 42'	Report	Salah 70'	Stadium: Estádio 24 de Setembro; Referee: Mahmood Ismail (Sudan)

==== U23 ====
===== Friendlies =====
7 September 2023	Egypt	1–1	Russia A'	Suez, Egypt
19:00 CAST (UTC+3)	Mazhar 7'	Report	Oganesyan 46'	Stadium: Suez Stadium; Referee: Ibrahim Nour El Din (Egypt)

11 September 2023	Egypt	2–1	Russia A'	Suez, Egypt
19:00 CAST (UTC+3)	Kravtsov 68' (o.g.); Badr 72'	Report	Pinyayev 7' (pen.)	Stadium: Suez Stadium; Referee: Hamada El Qalawi (Egypt)

12 October 2023	Egypt	3–1	Jordan	Cairo, Egypt
21:00 CAST (UTC+3)	Abdel Maguid 5'; Hamdy 41'; Hany 90+1'	Report	Abu Rahal 88'	Stadium: Osman Ahmed Osman Stadium; Referee: Ahmed El Ghandour (Egypt)

16 October 2023	Uzbekistan	1–2	Egypt	Tashkent, Uzbekistan
17:00 UZT (UTC+3)	Odilov 27'	Report	Mazhar 73'; Farag 90+3'	Stadium: Milliy Stadium

17 January 2024	Egypt	0–0	Qatar	Abu Dhabi, United Arab Emirates
17:00 GST (UTC+4)		Report		Stadium: Shahama Stadium

20 January 2024	Egypt	0–1	Iraq	Dubai, United Arab Emirates
19:30 GST (UTC+4)		Report	Fayaq 90+8'	Stadium: UAEFA Training Field

23 January 2024	Egypt	1–2	Saudi Arabia	Dubai, United Arab Emirates
16:00 GST (UTC+4)	Faisal 10'	Report	Aboulshamat 48' (pen.); Al Jaber 86'	Stadium: UAEFA Training Field

27 January 2024	United Arab Emirates	0–5	Egypt	Dubai, United Arab Emirates
16:00 GST (UTC+4)		Report	Al Maazmi 15' (o.g.); Saber 40', 57'; Shehata 48'; Faisal 52' (pen.)	Stadium: UAEFA Training Field

7 June 2024	Egypt	1–0	Ivory Coast	Cairo, Egypt
21:00 CAST (UTC+3)	Saad 7'	Report		Stadium: Cairo International Stadium; Referee: Mahmoud Bassiouny (Egypt)

11 June 2024	Egypt	2–1	Ivory Coast	Cairo, Egypt
19:00 CAST (UTC+3)	Saber 17', 19'	Report	Sanogo 90+6'	Stadium: Cairo International Stadium; Referee: Ibrahim Mohamed (Egypt)

===== 2024 WAFF U-23 Championship =====
20 March 2024 Quarter-finals	Egypt	1–0	United Arab Emirates	Hofuf, Saudi Arabia
23:00 AST (UTC+3)	Mazhar 81'	Report		Stadium: Prince Abdullah bin Jalawi Stadium; Referee: Abdullah Al Shehri (Saudi Arabia)

23 March 2024 Semi-finals	Australia	1–1 (2–1 p)	Egypt	Hofuf, Saudi Arabia
23:00 AST (UTC+3)	G. Kuol 15' (pen.)	Report	Hollman 22' (o.g.)	Stadium: Prince Abdullah bin Jalawi Stadium; Referee: Baraa Abu Aisha (Palestine)
	Penalties
	Courtney-Perkins (penalty missed); Okon-Engstler (penalty missed); Girdwood-Reich (penalty scored); Velupillay (penalty missed); Brook (penalty scored)		(penalty missed) Adel; (penalty missed) Faisal; (penalty scored) El Debes; (penalty missed) El Saaiy; (penalty missed) Eid

26 March 2024 Third place play-off	Egypt	2–2 (2–4 p)	Saudi Arabia	Al Mubarraz, Saudi Arabia
20:00 AST (UTC+3)	Saber 5'; Abdel Maguid 90+2'	Report	Al Sahafi 37'; Al Nemer 86'	Stadium: Al Fateh Stadium; Referee: Shiekh Ahmad Alaeddin (Lebanon)
	Penalties
	Faisal (penalty missed); Abdel Maguid (penalty scored); Fayed (penalty scored); El Maghrabi (penalty missed)		(penalty scored) S. Al Zaid; (penalty scored) Al Julaydan; (penalty scored) Barnawi; (penalty scored) Al Nemer

=== Women ===
==== Senior ====
===== 2024 Women's Africa Cup of Nations qualification =====
First round

20 September 2023 First leg	Egypt	4–0	South Sudan	Cairo, Egypt
19:00 CAST (UTC+3)	Adam 7'; Mostafa 28'; Samir 34'; Essam 57'			Stadium: Petrosport Stadium; Referee: Dorsaf Ganouati (Tunisia)

24 September 2023 Second leg	South Sudan	0–4 (0–8 agg.)	Egypt	Cairo, Egypt
16:00 CAST (UTC+3)			Adam 17'; Mostafa 21'; Essam 33', 72'	Stadium: Al Salam Stadium
Note: Both legs were played in Egypt.

Second round

30 November 2023 First leg	Senegal	4–0	Egypt	Thiès, Senegal
17:00 GMT (UTC+0)	Babou 26'; Ndiaye 30'; H. Diallo 68'; Sow 88'			Stadium: Stade Lat-Dior

5 December 2023 Second leg	Egypt	0–0 (0–4 agg.)	Senegal	Cairo, Egypt
18:00 CAT (UTC+2)				Stadium: Al Salam Stadium

==== U20 ====
===== Friendlies =====
6 September 2023	Egypt	3–1	Morocco	Alexandria, Egypt
18:00 CAST (UTC+3)	S. Khaled 35'; Ehab 53'; Mostafa 65'	Report	Oujamer 88'	Stadium: Alexandria Stadium; Referee: Shahenda El Maghrabi (Egypt)

9 September 2023	Egypt	1–0	Morocco	Alexandria, Egypt
18:00 CAST (UTC+3)	Abdel Rasoul 17'			Stadium: Alexandria Stadium; Referee: Nour Samir (Egypt)

===== 2024 FIFA U-20 Women's World Cup qualification =====
Second round

8 October 2023 First leg	Egypt	7–0	São Tomé and Príncipe	Alexandria, Egypt
16:00 CAST (UTC+3)	Abdel Wahed (?); Emad (?); Ehab (?); Essam (?); N. Khaled (?)			Stadium: Alexandria Stadium

13 October 2023 Second leg	São Tomé and Príncipe	0–11 (0–18 agg.)	Egypt	Alexandria, Egypt
16:00 CAST (UTC+3)			Mostafa 13', 44', 75'; Shehata 45+2'; N. Khaled 52'; Tarek 53', 56'; Essam 70'; Y. Khaled 71'; Omar 74'; Abdel Wahed 85'	Stadium: Alexandria Stadium
Note: Both legs were played in Egypt.

Third round

10 November 2023 First leg	Congo	1–1	Egypt	Brazzaville, Congo
15:30 WAT (UTC+1)	Ndengo 55'		Karim 20' (pen.)	Stadium: Stade Alphonse Massemba-Débat

18 November 2023 Second leg	Egypt	6–0 (7–1 agg.)	Congo	Alexandria, Egypt
17:00 CAT (UTC+2)	Essam 5'; Hesham 17'; Karim 67', 31'; Ehab 75'; Emad 79'			Stadium: Alexandria Stadium

Fourth round

12 January 2024 First leg	Egypt	2–4	Cameroon	Alexandria, Egypt
17:00 CAT (UTC+2)	Ramadan 17' (pen.); Emad 33' (pen.)	Report	Lemana 14'; Lamine 30', 78'; Meva Kiki 90+3'	Stadium: Alexandria Stadium; Referee: Aissata Boudy Lam (Mauritania)

21 January 2024 Second leg	Cameroon	1–1 (5–3 agg.)	Egypt	Douala, Cameroon
15:00 WAT (UTC+1)	Lamine 74'	Report	Essam 40'	Stadium: Stade de la Réunification; Referee: Suavis Iratunga (Burundi)

== International competitions ==
=== FIFA competitions ===
==== FIFA Club World Cup ====
15 December 2023 Second round	Al Ahly (Egypt)	3–1	(Saudi Arabia) Al Ittihad	Jeddah, Saudi Arabia
21:00 AST (UTC+3)	Maâloul 21' (pen.); El Shahat 59'; Ashour 62'	Report	Benzema 90+2'	Stadium: King Abdullah Sports City; Attendance: 56,111; Referee: Jesús Valenzuela (Venezuela)

19 December 2023 Semi-finals	Fluminense (Brazil)	2–0	(Egypt) Al Ahly	Jeddah, Saudi Arabia
21:00 AST (UTC+3)	Arias 71' (pen.); Kennedy 90'	Report		Stadium: King Abdullah Sports City; Attendance: 34,986; Referee: Szymon Marciniak (Poland)

22 December 2023 Third place play-off	Urawa Red Diamonds (Japan)	2–4	(Egypt) Al Ahly	Jeddah, Saudi Arabia
17:30 AST (UTC+3)	Kanté 43'; Scholz 54' (pen.)	Report	Ibrahim 19'; Tau 25'; Koizumi 60' (o.g.); Maâloul 90+8'	Stadium: Prince Abdullah Al Faisal Sports City; Attendance: 10,290; Referee: Tori Penso (United States)

=== CAF competitions ===
==== CAF Super Cup ====
15 September 2023
21:00 UTC+3

Al Ahly (Egypt)	0–1	(Algeria) USM Alger
	Report	Belaïd 43' (pen.)

King Fahd Stadium, Taif (Saudi Arabia)
Attendance: 10,000
Referee: Pierre Atcho (Gabon)

==== African Football League ====
Quarter-finals

Team 1	Agg.	Team 2	1st leg	2nd leg
Simba (Tanzania)	3–3 (a)	(Egypt) Al Ahly	2–2	1–1

Semi-finals

Team 1	Agg.	Team 2	1st leg	2nd leg
Mamelodi Sundowns (South Africa)	1–0	(Egypt) Al Ahly	1–0	0–0

==== CAF Champions League ====
Second round

Team 1	Agg.	Team 2	1st leg	2nd leg
Saint George (Ethiopia)	0–7	(Egypt) Al Ahly	0–3	0–4
APR (Rwanda)	1–6	(Egypt) Pyramids	0–0	1–6

Group stage

Group A

Pos	Team	Pld	W	D	L	GF	GA	GD	Pts	Qualification	SUN	TPM	NDB	PYR
1	(South Africa) Mamelodi Sundowns	6	4	1	1	7	1	+6	13	Advance to knockout stage	—	1–0	3–0	0–0
2	(Democratic Republic of the Congo) TP Mazembe	6	3	1	2	6	2	+4	10	Advance to knockout stage	1–0	—	2–0	3–0
3	(Mauritania) FC Nouadhibou	6	1	2	3	4	9	−5	5 (Note: Ranked on head-to-head points: FC Nouadhibou 4, Pyramids 1.)		0–2	0–0	—	2–0
4	(Egypt) Pyramids	6	1	2	3	3	8	−5	5		0–1	1–0	2–2	—

Source: CAF
Notes:

Group D

Pos	Team	Pld	W	D	L	GF	GA	GD	Pts	Qualification	AHL	YNG	CRB	MED
1	(Egypt) Al Ahly	6	3	3	0	6	1	+5	12	Advance to knockout stage	—	1–0	0–0	3–0
2	(Tanzania) Young Africans	6	2	2	2	9	6	+3	8 (Note: Ranked on head-to-head goal difference: Young Africans +1, CR Belouizdad –1.)	Advance to knockout stage	1–1	—	4–0	3–0
3	(Algeria) CR Belouizdad	6	2	2	2	7	6	+1	8		0–0	3–0	—	3–0
4	(Ghana) Medeama	6	1	1	4	3	12	−9	4		0–1	1–1	2–1	—

Source: CAF
Notes:

Quarter-finals

Team 1	Agg.	Team 2	1st leg	2nd leg
Simba (Tanzania)	0–3	(Egypt) Al Ahly	0–1	0–2

Semi-finals

Team 1	Agg.	Team 2	1st leg	2nd leg
TP Mazembe (Democratic Republic of the Congo)	0–3	(Egypt) Al Ahly	0–0	0–3

Final

Team 1	Agg.	Team 2	1st leg	2nd leg
Espérance de Tunis (Tunisia)	0–1	(Egypt) Al Ahly	0–0	0–1

==== CAF Confederation Cup ====
Second round

Team 1	Agg.	Team 2	1st leg	2nd leg
Arta Solar (Djibouti)	3–4	(Egypt) Zamalek	2–0	1–4
Singida Fountain Gate (Tanzania)	2–4	(Egypt) Modern Future	1–0	1–4

Group stage

Group A

Pos	Team	Pld	W	D	L	GF	GA	GD	Pts	Qualification	USMA	MOF	HIL	SSU
1	(Algeria) USM Alger	6	4	1	1	8	3	+5	13	Advance to knockout stage	—	1–0	2–0	2–1
2	(Egypt) Modern Future	6	3	2	1	9	3	+6	11	Advance to knockout stage	0–0	—	5–0	1–0
3	(Libya) Al Hilal Benghazi	6	2	0	4	6	13	−7	6		2–1	1–2	—	2–1
4	(South Africa) SuperSport United	6	1	1	4	5	9	−4	4		0–2	1–1	2–1	—

Source: CAF

Group B

Pos	Team	Pld	W	D	L	GF	GA	GD	Pts	Qualification	ZAM	SAL	SGA	SOAR
1	(Egypt) Zamalek	6	5	1	0	11	1	+10	16	Advance to knockout stage	—	1–0	1–0	3–0 (Note: CAF awarded Zamalek a 3–0 win after Académie SOAR failed to travel to Egypt.)
2	(Libya) Abu Salim	6	3	0	3	5	6	−1	9	Advance to knockout stage	1–2	—	1–0	1–0
3	(Angola) Sagrada Esperança	6	2	2	2	5	2	+3	8		0–0	3–0	—	2–0
4	(Guinea) Académie SOAR	6	0	1	5	0	12	−12	1		0–4	0–2	0–0	—

Source: CAF
Notes:

Quarter-finals

Team 1	Agg.	Team 2	1st leg	2nd leg
Modern Future (Egypt)	2–3	(Egypt) Zamalek	1–2	1–1

Semi-finals

Team 1	Agg.	Team 2	1st leg	2nd leg
Zamalek (Egypt)	3–0	(Ghana) Dreams FC	0–0	3–0

Final

Team 1	Agg.	Team 2	1st leg	2nd leg
RS Berkane (Morocco)	2–2 (a)	(Egypt) Zamalek	2–1	0–1

==== CAF Women's Champions League ====
UNAF Qualifiers

Pos	Team	Pld	W	D	L	GF	GA	GD	Pts	Qualification
1	(Morocco) SC Casablanca	3	3	0	0	13	5	+8	9	Main tournament
2	(Algeria) Afak Relizane	3	2	0	1	12	5	+7	6	
3	(Egypt) Wadi Degla (H)	3	1	0	2	7	13	−6	3	
4	(Tunisia) ASF Sousse	3	0	0	3	4	13	−9	0	

Source: unafonline.org
(H) Hosts

=== UAFA competitions ===
==== Arab Club Champions Cup ====
Group C

Pos	Team	Pld	W	D	L	GF	GA	GD	Pts	Qualification
1	(Saudi Arabia) Al-Shabab	3	2	1	0	2	0	+2	7	Advance to knockout stage
2	(Saudi Arabia) Al-Nassr	3	1	2	0	5	2	+3	5	Advance to knockout stage
3	(Egypt) Zamalek	3	1	1	1	5	2	+3	4	
4	(Tunisia) US Monastir	3	0	0	3	1	9	−8	0	

Source: UAFA

== Domestic competitions ==
=== Premier League ===
Pos	Team	Pld	W	D	L	GF	GA	GD	Pts	Qualification or relegation
1	Al Ahly (C)	34	27	4	3	75	28	+47	85	Qualification for the Champions League second round (Note: Al Ahly qualified for the Champions League second round by winning the 2023–24 CAF Champions League.)
2	Pyramids	34	24	7	3	62	27	+35	79	Qualification for the Champions League first round
3	Zamalek	34	17	8	9	53	37	+16	56 (Note: Zamalek were deducted three points for refusing to play their away fixture against Al Ahly, scheduled to be played on 25 June 2024.)	Qualification for the Confederation Cup second round (Note: Zamalek qualified for the Confederation Cup second round by winning the 2023–24 CAF Confederation Cup.)
4	Al Masry	34	16	7	11	41	39	+2	55	Qualification for the Confederation Cup second round (Note: The league was not finished by the CAF deadline for associations to submit teams participating in next season's CAF competitions. As a result, Al Masry, who finished the first half of the season at third place (and were also at third place by the time of the draw) qualified for the CAF Confederation Cup.)
5	Modern Future	34	14	12	8	40	28	+12	54 (Note: Head-to-head points: Modern Future 4, Smouha 1.)	
6	Smouha	34	15	9	10	39	35	+4	54	
7	ZED	34	13	12	9	48	35	+13	51	
8	Ceramica Cleopatra	34	12	10	12	51	42	+9	46	
9	ENPPI	34	11	12	11	38	37	+1	45	
10	Tala'ea El Gaish	34	10	12	12	30	40	−10	42	
11	Al Ittihad	34	9	14	11	30	42	−12	41	
12	El Gouna	34	9	12	13	32	44	−12	39	
13	National Bank of Egypt	34	9	9	16	46	45	+1	36	
14	Ismaily	34	7	12	15	33	43	−10	33 (Note: Tied on head-to-head points (3). Head-to-head goal difference: Ismaily +1, Pharco –1.)	
15	Pharco	34	6	15	13	32	43	−11	33	
16	Baladiyat El Mahalla (R)	34	7	7	20	31	65	−34	28	Relegation to Second Division A
17	Al Mokawloon Al Arab (R)	34	5	11	18	32	57	−25	26	Relegation to Second Division A
18	El Dakhleya (R)	34	3	11	20	17	43	−26	20	Relegation to Second Division A

Source: Soccerway
Rules for classification: 1) Points; 2) Head-to-head points; 3) Head-to-head goal difference; 4) Goal difference; 5) Goals scored; 6) Play-off tie.
(Note: Head-to-head records are used for final standings only)
(C) Champions; (R) Relegated

=== Second Division A ===
==== Regular season ====
Pos	Team	Pld	W	D	L	GF	GA	GD	Pts	Promotion, qualification or relegation
1	Petrojet (C, P)	28	19	7	2	50	21	+29	64	Promotion to Premier League
2	Ghazl El Mahalla (P)	28	13	13	2	35	18	+17	52	Promotion to Premier League
3	Haras El Hodoud (O, P)	28	11	16	1	34	22	+12	49	Qualification for promotion play-offs
4	La Viena	28	13	9	6	42	25	+17	48	
5	Wadi Degla	28	11	13	4	36	24	+12	46	
6	Tanta	28	11	6	11	30	27	+3	39	
7	El Sekka El Hadid	28	8	14	6	29	24	+5	38 (Note: Head-to-head points: El Sekka El Hadid 4, Raya Ghazl Kafr El Dawar 1.)	
8	Raya Ghazl Kafr El Dawar	28	8	14	6	27	28	−1	38	
9	Proxy	28	9	10	9	28	35	−7	37	
10	El Qanah	28	9	9	10	27	23	+4	36	
11	Abou Qir Fertilizers	28	13	9	6	34	21	+13	48	
12	Asyut Petroleum	28	10	11	7	29	26	+3	41	
13	Telecom Egypt	28	11	6	11	33	29	+4	39	
14	Aswan	28	10	8	10	31	28	+3	38	
15	Dikernis (R)	28	9	9	10	31	35	−4	36	Relegation to Second Division B
16	Makadi (R)	28	5	12	11	31	36	−5	27	Relegation to Second Division B
17	Gomhoriat Shebin (R)	28	6	7	15	20	37	−17	25	Relegation to Second Division B
18	Nogoom (R)	28	4	8	16	22	44	−22	20	Relegation to Second Division B
19	Al Nasr Lel Taa'den (R)	28	2	6	20	26	54	−28	12 (Note: Head-to-head points: Al Nasr Lel Taa'den 4, Misr Lel Makkasa 1.)	Relegation to Second Division B
20	Misr Lel Makkasa (R)	28	3	3	22	28	66	−38	12	Relegation to Second Division B

Source: Soccerway (regular season), Soccerway (promotion round), Soccerway (relegation round)
Rules for classification: 1) Points; 2) Head-to-head points; 3) Head-to-head goal difference; 4) Goal difference; 5) Goals scored; 6) Play-off tie.
(C) Champions; (O) Play-off winners; (P) Promoted; (R) Relegated

==== Play-offs ====
Pos	Team	Pld	W	D	L	GF	GA	GD	Pts	Promotion or qualification
1	Haras El Hodoud (P)	6	4	1	1	8	5	+3	13	Promotion to Premier League
2	Sporting Alexandria	6	2	2	2	5	7	−2	8 (Note: Head-to-head points: Sporting Alexandria 4, Suez 1.)	Participation in Second Division A
3	Suez	6	2	2	2	4	4	0	8	Participation in Second Division A
4	Tersana	6	1	1	4	6	7	−1	4	Participation in Second Division A

Source: Soccerway
Rules for classification: 1) Points; 2) Head-to-head points; 3) Head-to-head goal difference; 4) Goal difference; 5) Goals scored; 6) Play-off.
(Note: Head-to-head records are used for final standings only)
(P) Promoted

=== Second Division B ===
==== Group A ====
Pos	Team	Pld	W	D	L	GF	GA	GD	Pts	Qualification or relegation
1	Dayrout (P)	16	10	5	1	27	11	+16	35 (Note: Head-to-head points: Dayrout 4, Al Aluminium 1.)	Qualification for promotion play-offs
2	Al Aluminium	16	10	5	1	24	12	+12	35	
3	Asyut Cement	16	7	6	3	31	16	+15	27	
4	Tahta	16	8	1	7	18	13	+5	25	
5	KIMA Aswan	16	5	5	6	17	22	−5	20	
6	Luxor	16	4	6	6	16	22	−6	18	
7	Muslim Youths (Qena)	16	4	5	7	17	26	−9	17	
8	Qus	16	3	2	11	13	29	−16	11	
9	Mallawi (R)	16	1	5	10	10	22	−12	8	Relegation to Third Division

Source: Kooora
Rules for classification: 1) Points; 2) Head-to-head points; 3) Head-to-head goal difference; 4) Goal difference; 5) Goals scored; 6) Play-off tie.
(P) Promoted; (R) Relegated

==== Group B ====
Pos	Team	Pld	W	D	L	GF	GA	GD	Pts	Qualification or relegation
1	Tersana (O, P)	16	13	3	0	35	5	+30	42	Qualification for promotion play-offs
2	Faiyum	16	6	9	1	16	10	+6	27	
3	El Minya	16	6	6	4	19	16	+3	24	
4	Egypt Stars	16	6	3	7	20	13	+7	21	
5	Telephonat Beni Suef	16	6	1	9	18	25	−7	19	
6	Al Wasta	16	3	7	6	17	22	−5	16 (Note: Tied on head-to-head points (3). Head-to-head goal difference: Al Wasta +1, MS Tamya −1.)	
7	MS Tamya	16	4	4	8	15	31	−16	16	
8	Beni Mazar	16	3	5	8	18	27	−9	14 (Note: Head-to-head points: Beni Mazar 4, MS Maghagha 1.)	
9	MS Maghagha (R)	16	2	8	6	13	22	−9	14	Relegation to Third Division

Source: Kooora
Rules for classification: 1) Points; 2) Head-to-head points; 3) Head-to-head goal difference; 4) Goal difference; 5) Goals scored; 6) Play-off tie.
(O) Play-off winners; (P) Promoted; (R) Relegated

==== Group C ====
Pos	Team	Pld	W	D	L	GF	GA	GD	Pts	Qualification or relegation
1	Suez (O, P)	16	9	6	1	25	9	+16	33	Qualification for promotion play-offs
2	Al Obour	16	8	8	0	24	15	+9	32	
3	Al Nasr	16	7	8	1	28	13	+15	29	
4	El Shams	16	8	2	6	29	16	+13	26 (Note: Tied on head-to-head points (3) and on head-to-head goal difference (0). Overall goal difference: El Shams +13, Al Merreikh +11.)	
5	Al Merreikh	16	7	5	4	27	16	+11	26	
6	Al Mostaqbal	16	6	5	5	18	18	0	23	
7	South Sinai	16	4	4	8	18	29	−11	16	
8	Sinai Star	16	3	2	11	19	31	−12	11	
9	MS Arish (R)	16	0	0	16	4	45	−41	0	Relegation to Third Division

Source: Kooora
Rules for classification: 1) Points; 2) Head-to-head points; 3) Head-to-head goal difference; 4) Goal difference; 5) Goals scored; 6) Play-off tie.
(O) Play-off winners; (P) Promoted; (R) Relegated

==== Group D ====
Pos	Team	Pld	W	D	L	GF	GA	GD	Pts	Qualification or relegation
1	Kahraba Ismailia (P)	16	9	6	1	20	10	+10	33	Qualification for promotion play-offs
2	Team FC	16	8	6	2	17	8	+9	30 (Note: Head-to-head points: Team FC 4, El Entag El Harby 1.)	
3	El Entag El Harby	16	8	6	2	25	12	+13	30	
4	Port Fouad	16	6	5	5	17	16	+1	23	
5	Misr Insurance	16	4	6	6	14	19	−5	18	
6	Alo Egypt	16	3	8	5	15	11	+4	17	
7	Ittihad El Shorta	16	2	9	5	11	12	−1	15	
8	Eastern Company	16	3	5	8	13	18	−5	14	
9	Porto Suez (R)	16	3	1	12	9	35	−26	10	Relegation to Third Division

Source: Kooora
Rules for classification: 1) Points; 2) Head-to-head points; 3) Head-to-head goal difference; 4) Goal difference; 5) Goals scored; 6) Play-off tie.
(P) Promoted; (R) Relegated

==== Group E ====
Pos	Team	Pld	W	D	L	GF	GA	GD	Pts	Qualification or relegation
1	El Mansoura (P)	18	9	9	0	20	5	+15	36 (Note: Tied on head-to-head points (2) and on head-to-head goal difference (0). Overall goal difference: El Mansoura +15, MS El Kazazin +13.)	Qualification for promotion play-offs
2	MS El Kazazin	18	10	6	2	21	8	+13	36	
3	Maleyat Kafr El Zayat	18	8	8	2	24	16	+8	32	
4	Pioneers	18	6	10	2	19	13	+6	28 (Note: Tied on head-to-head points (2) and on head-to-head goal difference (0). Overall goal difference: Pioneers +6, Ittihad Nabarouh +3.)	
5	Ittihad Nabarouh	18	7	7	4	19	16	+3	28	
6	Said El Mahalla	18	5	6	7	17	18	−1	21	
7	Kafr El Sheikh	18	5	4	9	18	22	−4	19	
8	Beni Ebeid	18	4	6	8	13	19	−6	18	
9	MS Tala	18	3	2	13	12	32	−20	11	
10	Bilqas (R)	18	2	4	12	7	21	−14	10	Relegation to Third Division

Source: Kooora
Rules for classification: 1) Points; 2) Head-to-head points; 3) Head-to-head goal difference; 4) Goal difference; 5) Goals scored; 6) Play-off tie.
(P) Promoted; (R) Relegated

==== Group F ====
Pos	Team	Pld	W	D	L	GF	GA	GD	Pts	Qualification or relegation
1	Sporting Alexandria (O, P)	18	10	5	3	28	18	+10	35	Qualification for promotion play-offs
2	Olympic Club	18	8	6	4	19	14	+5	30	
3	Al Hilal (El Dabaa)	18	8	5	5	17	12	+5	29	
4	Al Hammam	18	8	4	6	24	25	−1	28	
5	Fleet Club	18	7	3	8	21	22	−1	24	
6	Delphi	18	5	8	5	19	18	+1	23 (Note: Head-to-head points: Delphi 4, Ala'ab Damanhour 1.)	
7	Ala'ab Damanhour	18	6	5	7	15	17	−2	23	
8	Al Magd	18	5	7	6	10	10	0	22	
9	MS Koum Hamada	18	5	3	10	18	24	−6	18	
10	Alexandria Petroleum (R)	18	2	6	10	13	24	−11	12	Relegation to Third Division

Source: Kooora
Rules for classification: 1) Points; 2) Head-to-head points; 3) Head-to-head goal difference; 4) Goal difference; 5) Goals scored; 6) Play-off tie.
(O) Play-off winners; (P) Promoted; (R) Relegated

==== Play-offs ====
Team 1	Score	Team 2
Dayrout	1–1 (3–4 p)	Tersana
Suez	1–0	Kahraba Ismailia
El Mansoura	0–0 (3–4 p)	Sporting Alexandria

=== Third Division ===
==== Group A ====
Pos	Team	Pld	W	D	L	GF	GA	GD	Pts	Promotion or relegation
1	Al Madina Al Monawara (P)	18	11	5	2	22	9	+13	38	Promotion to Second Division B
2	Qena	18	10	6	2	20	8	+12	36	
3	Al Salam (Esna)	18	6	6	6	19	20	−1	24 (Note: Teams are ranked on head-to-head record.)	
4	MS Edfu	18	7	3	8	22	23	−1	24	
5	Abou El Reesh	18	5	7	6	23	24	−1	22	
6	Qeft	18	4	9	5	18	20	−2	21	
7	El Tahrir (Aswan)	18	4	8	6	23	21	+2	20 (Note: Teams are ranked on head-to-head record.)	
8	MS Esna	18	5	5	8	11	17	−6	20	
9	MS El Hasaya	18	3	8	7	18	26	−8	17	
10	Sokar Qus (R)	18	3	7	8	12	20	−8	16	Relegation to Fourth Division

Source: EFA - Luxor branch
Rules for classification: 1) Points; 2) Head-to-head points; 3) Head-to-head goal difference; 4) Goal difference; 5) Goals scored; 6) Play-off tie.
(P) Promoted; (R) Relegated

==== Group B ====
Pos	Team	Pld	W	D	L	GF	GA	GD	Pts	Promotion or relegation
1	MS Sohag (P)	14	10	2	2	19	10	+9	32	Promotion to Second Division B
2	Sohag	14	9	3	2	20	5	+15	30	
3	Al Hilal (Tahta)	14	7	5	2	21	10	+11	26	
4	MS Abou Tisht	14	5	4	5	18	20	−2	19	
5	Shoban Al Maragha	14	3	5	6	14	15	−1	14	
6	Al Maragha	14	3	4	7	11	21	−10	13	
7	Workers (Ras Gharib)	14	2	4	8	18	21	−3	10	
8	Girga (R)	14	1	5	8	9	28	−19	8	Relegation to Fourth Division

Source: Hesham Mokhtar Karim
Rules for classification: 1) Points; 2) Head-to-head points; 3) Head-to-head goal difference; 4) Goal difference; 5) Goals scored; 6) Play-off tie.
(P) Promoted; (R) Relegated

==== Group C ====
Pos	Team	Pld	W	D	L	GF	GA	GD	Pts	Promotion or relegation
1	Al Badari (P)	16	7	6	3	17	14	+3	27	Promotion to Second Division B
2	New Valley	16	7	5	4	27	20	+7	26 (Note: Teams are ranked on head-to-head record.)	
3	MS Naser Mallawi	16	8	2	6	23	17	+6	26	
4	MS Matai	16	6	5	5	25	19	+6	23	
5	El Qusiya	16	5	6	5	19	18	+1	21	
6	Naser El Fekreia	16	5	4	7	20	20	0	19	
7	Sahel Selim	16	3	9	4	24	29	−5	18	
8	Asyut	16	3	7	6	14	18	−4	16	
9	Abou Tig (R)	16	3	6	7	14	28	−14	15	Relegation to Fourth Division

Source: EFA - Asyut branch
Rules for classification: 1) Points; 2) Head-to-head points; 3) Head-to-head goal difference; 4) Goal difference; 5) Goals scored; 6) Play-off tie.
(P) Promoted; (R) Relegated

==== Group D ====
Pos	Team	Pld	W	D	L	GF	GA	GD	Pts	Promotion or relegation
1	Tutankhamun (P)	18	16	1	1	52	10	+42	49	Promotion to Second Division B
2	Beni Suef	18	13	3	2	38	10	+28	42	
3	MS Sinnuris	18	12	2	4	48	30	+18	38	
4	Al Ahly (El Gharaq)	18	7	3	8	23	22	+1	24	
5	MS Faiyum	18	5	5	8	21	24	−3	20 (Note: Teams are ranked on head-to-head record.)	
6	MS Ibshaway	18	5	5	8	23	33	−10	20	
7	MS Sumusta	18	5	4	9	29	44	−15	19	
8	Abou Kasah	18	3	6	9	25	35	−10	15	
9	Matar Taris	18	3	4	11	19	51	−32	13	
10	MS Atsa (R)	18	3	3	12	15	34	−19	12	Relegation to Fourth Division

Source: EFA - Faiyum branch
Rules for classification: 1) Points; 2) Head-to-head points; 3) Head-to-head goal difference; 4) Goal difference; 5) Goals scored; 6) Play-off tie.
(P) Promoted; (R) Relegated

==== Group E ====
Pos	Team	Pld	W	D	L	GF	GA	GD	Pts	Promotion or relegation
1	Diamond (P)	26	21	2	3	63	13	+50	65	Promotion to Second Division B
2	Media	26	16	6	4	53	16	+37	54	
3	MS Bashtil	26	13	7	6	44	28	+16	46 (Note: Teams are ranked on head-to-head record.)	
4	Al Maadi & Al Yacht	26	13	7	6	44	27	+17	46	
5	Orange	26	12	7	7	31	17	+14	43	
6	Helwan El Aam	26	11	6	9	42	30	+12	39	
7	El Said (Giza)	26	10	7	9	35	28	+7	37	
8	Pyramids Gardens	26	8	10	8	35	21	+14	34	
9	Manshiyat Naser	26	9	5	12	48	47	+1	32	
10	MS Abou El Namras	26	9	4	13	28	40	−12	31	
11	MS Atfih	26	8	3	15	28	37	−9	27 (Note: Teams are ranked on head-to-head record.)	
12	Cascada	26	6	9	11	25	40	−15	27	
13	MS Sol (R)	26	4	9	13	32	48	−16	21	Relegation to Fourth Division
14	Helwan Cement (R)	26	1	0	25	17	133	−116	3	Relegation to Fourth Division

Source: EFA - Giza branch
Rules for classification: 1) Points; 2) Head-to-head points; 3) Head-to-head goal difference; 4) Goal difference; 5) Goals scored; 6) Play-off tie.
(P) Promoted; (R) Relegated

==== Group F ====
Pos	Team	Pld	W	D	L	GF	GA	GD	Pts	Promotion or relegation
1	Plastic Shubra El Kheima (P)	26	18	7	1	56	24	+32	61 (Note: Teams are ranked on head-to-head record.)	Promotion to Second Division B (Note: On 16 August 2024, the Egyptian Football Association announced the promotion of Benha and Al Jazeera to the Egyptian Second Division B due to administrative errors. This decision followed appeals by both teams against Plastic Shubra El Kheima and MS El Dabaa, respectively, who had fielded ineligible players during their second-leg matches. As the 2023–24 season had already concluded, the EFA was unable to award 2–0 victories or update league standings, prompting them to promote the affected teams, who would have topped their groups with the awarded points.)
2	Benha (P)	26	18	7	1	38	12	+26	61	Promotion to Second Division B
3	MS Toukh	26	15	7	4	46	19	+27	52	
4	El Marg	26	9	13	4	33	22	+11	40	
5	Aviation Club	26	11	5	10	31	25	+6	38	
6	Heliopolis	26	9	7	10	35	30	+5	34 (Note: Teams are ranked on head-to-head record.)	
7	MS Qalyub	26	7	13	6	17	16	+1	34	
8	Esco	26	7	10	9	24	28	−4	31	
9	El Matareya	26	7	8	11	23	25	−2	29	
10	El Qanater El Khairiya	26	6	10	10	20	30	−10	28	
11	Bahtim	26	6	9	11	23	24	−1	27	
12	MS Batta	26	6	7	13	24	43	−19	25	
13	Almaza (R)	26	5	6	15	21	40	−19	21	Relegation to Fourth Division
14	MS Abou El Saoud (R)	26	3	1	22	23	76	−53	10	Relegation to Fourth Division

Source: Mohamed Talaat
Rules for classification: 1) Points; 2) Head-to-head points; 3) Head-to-head goal difference; 4) Goal difference; 5) Goals scored; 6) Play-off tie.
(P) Promoted; (R) Relegated

==== Group G ====
Group G1

Pos	Team	Pld	W	D	L	GF	GA	GD	Pts	Qualification or relegation
1	Damietta (O, P)	14	7	4	3	16	9	+7	25	Qualification for promotion play-offs
2	Al Rebat & Al Anwar	14	7	3	4	9	7	+2	24	Qualification for promotion play-offs
3	El Gamarek	14	6	5	3	12	8	+4	23	
4	Kapci	14	5	6	3	12	7	+5	21	
5	El Nuba	14	4	4	6	12	16	−4	16 (Note: Teams are ranked on head-to-head record.)	
6	MS Amer Village	14	4	4	6	21	19	+2	16	
7	Manshiyat El Shohada	14	4	4	6	14	21	−7	16	
8	Fayed (R)	14	2	4	8	6	15	−9	10	Relegation to Fourth Division

Source: Second Division B Media
Rules for classification: 1) Points; 2) Head-to-head points; 3) Head-to-head goal difference; 4) Goal difference; 5) Goals scored; 6) Play-off tie.
(O) Play-off winners; (P) Promoted; (R) Relegated
Notes:

Group G2

Pos	Team	Pld	W	D	L	GF	GA	GD	Pts	Qualification
1	Sharm El Sheikh	6	4	2	0	19	7	+12	14	Qualification for promotion play-offs
2	MS El Wadi	6	1	4	1	7	7	0	7 (Note: Teams are ranked on head-to-head record.)	
3	MS El Tour	6	1	4	1	6	9	−3	7	
4	MS Abou Zenima	6	0	2	4	5	14	−9	2	

Source: EFA - Port Said branch
Rules for classification: 1) Points; 2) Head-to-head points; 3) Head-to-head goal difference; 4) Goal difference; 5) Goals scored; 6) Play-off tie.

==== Group H ====
Pos	Team	Pld	W	D	L	GF	GA	GD	Pts	Promotion or relegation
1	El Sharkia (P)	22	15	4	3	43	15	+28	49	Promotion to Second Division B
2	Al Shanwani	22	12	10	0	32	9	+23	46	
3	Sers Al Layanah	22	10	9	3	24	14	+10	39	
4	MS Faqous	22	10	6	6	35	23	+12	36	
5	Borussia Egypt	22	10	4	8	27	28	−1	34	
6	Belbeis	22	8	9	5	28	21	+7	33	
7	Menouf	22	6	8	8	20	20	0	26	
8	MS Diarb Negm	22	5	8	9	17	28	−11	23	
9	Mit Khalaf	22	5	7	10	29	29	0	22 (Note: Teams are ranked on head-to-head record.)	
10	Faqous	22	5	7	10	23	40	−17	22	
11	Ashmoun (R)	22	4	7	11	32	36	−4	19	Relegation to Fourth Division
12	MS Abshish (R)	22	2	1	19	11	58	−47	7	Relegation to Fourth Division

Source: EFA - Sharkia branch
Rules for classification: 1) Points; 2) Head-to-head points; 3) Head-to-head goal difference; 4) Goal difference; 5) Goals scored; 6) Play-off tie.
(P) Promoted; (R) Relegated

==== Group I ====
Pos	Team	Pld	W	D	L	GF	GA	GD	Pts	Promotion or relegation
1	Belqas City (P)	24	17	4	3	44	19	+25	55	Promotion to Second Division B
2	Ras El Bar	24	16	6	2	42	19	+23	54	
3	Al Zarka	24	12	8	4	38	21	+17	44	
4	Minyat El Nasr	24	12	6	6	34	19	+15	42	
5	Sherbeen	24	12	5	7	41	24	+17	41	
6	Shoban Badaway	24	10	5	9	31	35	−4	35	
7	DKWASC	24	8	10	6	24	20	+4	34	
8	El Senbellawein	24	6	8	10	19	30	−11	26	
9	MS Minyat Samanoud	24	7	4	13	25	38	−13	25 (Note: Teams are ranked on head-to-head record.)	
10	MS El Serw	24	6	7	11	21	28	−7	25	
11	MS Aga	24	5	7	12	17	26	−9	22	
12	MS Damietta City (R)	24	5	3	16	19	45	−26	18	Relegation to Fourth Division
13	MS Faraskur (R)	24	3	1	20	13	44	−31	10	Relegation to Fourth Division

Source: EFA - Dakahlia branch
Rules for classification: 1) Points; 2) Head-to-head points; 3) Head-to-head goal difference; 4) Goal difference; 5) Goals scored; 6) Play-off tie.
(P) Promoted; (R) Relegated

==== Group J ====
Pos	Team	Pld	W	D	L	GF	GA	GD	Pts	Promotion or relegation
1	Biyala (P)	24	15	5	4	32	18	+14	50	Promotion to Second Division B
2	Baltim	24	13	7	4	33	12	+21	46	
3	Samanoud	24	12	9	3	30	15	+15	45	
4	MS Basyoun	24	11	7	6	28	17	+11	40	
5	Ittihad Basyoun	24	11	4	9	29	28	+1	37	
6	Othmason Tanta	24	9	5	10	36	31	+5	32	
7	Al Hamoul	24	7	8	9	23	26	−3	29	
8	Sakha	24	6	10	8	16	17	−1	28 (Note: Teams are ranked on head-to-head record.)	
9	Sporting Castle	24	7	7	10	21	27	−6	28	
10	Qallin	24	8	3	13	20	32	−12	27	
11	Sidi Salem	24	6	6	12	24	26	−2	24 (Note: Teams are ranked on head-to-head record.)	
12	Desouk (R)	24	6	6	12	24	38	−14	24	Relegation to Fourth Division
13	MS Qutur (R)	24	4	5	15	19	48	−29	17	Relegation to Fourth Division

Source: EFA - Gharbia branch
Rules for classification: 1) Points; 2) Head-to-head points; 3) Head-to-head goal difference; 4) Goal difference; 5) Goals scored; 6) Play-off tie.
(P) Promoted; (R) Relegated

==== Group K ====
Pos	Team	Pld	W	D	L	GF	GA	GD	Pts	Promotion or relegation
1	Horse Owners' Club (P)	23	12	8	3	34	18	+16	44	Promotion to Second Division B
2	MS Itay El Baroud	23	11	9	3	32	16	+16	42	
3	MS El Delengat	23	11	8	4	24	16	+8	41	
4	MS Abou El Matamir	23	11	6	6	38	25	+13	39	
5	El Teram	23	9	11	3	24	15	+9	38	
6	MS El Amreya	23	7	12	4	31	23	+8	33	
7	Kafr Bulin	23	8	7	8	25	27	−2	31	
8	MS Abou Homos	23	7	7	9	25	29	−4	28 (Note: Teams are ranked on head-to-head record.)	
9	El Montaza	23	8	4	11	20	28	−8	28	
10	Badr	23	5	8	10	28	33	−5	23	
11	BWADC	23	4	8	11	25	32	−7	20	
12	MS El Maamora (R)	23	3	6	14	21	36	−15	15	Relegation to Fourth Division
13	Nahdat El Amreya (R)	12	0	2	10	0	29	−29	2	Withdrawal (Note: On 4 January 2024, Nahdat El Amreya submitted a request to withdraw from the league after the first half of the season due to financial issues. The Egyptian Football Association confirmed the club's withdrawal on the next day, and that the club would be relegated to Fourth Division, per the competition's regulations.)

Source: EFA - Alexandria branch
Rules for classification: 1) Points; 2) Head-to-head points; 3) Head-to-head goal difference; 4) Goal difference; 5) Goals scored; 6) Play-off tie.
(P) Promoted; (R) Relegated

==== Group L ====
Pos	Team	Pld	W	D	L	GF	GA	GD	Pts	Promotion or relegation
1	6th of October (P)	17	12	3	2	33	14	+19	39	Promotion to Second Division B
2	MS Salem El Hersh	17	12	1	4	39	18	+21	37	
3	Al Nasr (Arish)	17	10	4	3	48	15	+33	34	
4	Abou Sakal	17	6	8	3	35	18	+17	26	
5	MS Martyr Ahmed El Mansi	17	7	1	9	29	31	−2	22	
6	MS El Kherba	17	5	6	6	27	35	−8	21	
7	MS Baloza	17	5	3	9	31	43	−12	18	
8	Al Fayrouz	17	3	7	7	23	29	−6	16	
9	Bir Al Abd	17	1	6	10	25	44	−19	9	
10	MS Masr (R)	9	0	1	8	7	50	−43	1	Withdrawal (Note: On 26 December 2023, the Egyptian Football Association announced that MS Masr withdrew from the league due to financial issues, and that the club would be relegated to Fourth Division, per the competition's regulations.)

Source: EFA - North Sinai branch
Rules for classification: 1) Points; 2) Head-to-head points; 3) Head-to-head goal difference; 4) Goal difference; 5) Goals scored; 6) Play-off tie.
(P) Promoted; (R) Relegated

==== Group M ====
Pos	Team	Pld	W	D	L	GF	GA	GD	Pts	Promotion or relegation
1	El Zohour (P)	15	9	4	2	35	13	+22	31	Promotion to Second Division B
2	El Raja	15	9	3	3	29	14	+15	30 (Note: Teams are ranked on head-to-head record.)	
3	Al Jazeera (P)	15	9	3	3	20	12	+8	30	Promotion to Second Division B (Note: On 16 August 2024, the Egyptian Football Association announced the promotion of Benha and Al Jazeera to the Egyptian Second Division B due to administrative errors. This decision followed appeals by both teams against Plastic Shubra El Kheima and MS El Dabaa, respectively, who had fielded ineligible players during their second-leg matches. As the 2023–24 season had already concluded, the EFA was unable to award 2–0 victories or update league standings, prompting them to promote the affected teams, who would have topped their groups with the awarded points.)
4	MS El Dabaa	15	8	3	4	27	18	+9	27	
5	El Salloum	15	5	4	6	30	29	+1	19	
6	Al Masry (El Salloum)	15	4	2	9	23	31	−8	14	
7	Matruh	15	2	7	6	20	26	−6	12 (Note: Teams are ranked on head-to-head record. The second match involving Matruh and Al Nasr (Sidi Barrani) was abandoned after a riot broke out between the players and technical staff of both teams, while the result of the match was 0–0. The Egyptian Football Association announced on 2 January 2024 that the match would be not replayed, and that the match points would be withheld from both teams; deducting one point from each team as a result.)	
8	Al Nasr (Sidi Barrani)	15	3	4	8	14	29	−15	12	
9	Wydad Matruh (D, R)	8	0	0	8	4	30	−26	0	Disqualified (Note: On 28 December 2023, the Egyptian Football Association announced that Wydad Matruh were disqualified from the league due to failing to attend their fixtures, and that the club would be relegated to Fourth Division.)
10	MS Siwa (R)	0	0	0	0	0	0	0	0	Withdrawal (Note: On 7 November 2023, the Egyptian Football Association announced that MS Siwa withdrew from the league, and that the club would be relegated to Fourth Division, per the competition's regulations.)

Source: El Zohour SC
Rules for classification: 1) Points; 2) Head-to-head points; 3) Head-to-head goal difference; 4) Goal difference; 5) Goals scored; 6) Play-off tie.
(D) Disqualified; (P) Promoted; (R) Relegated

==== Play-offs ====
Pos	Team	Pld	W	D	L	GF	GA	GD	Pts	Promotion
1	Damietta (P)	2	1	1	0	2	1	+1	4	Promotion to Second Division B
2	Al Rebat & Al Anwar	2	1	0	1	2	1	+1	3	
3	Sharm El Sheikh	2	0	1	1	1	3	−2	1	

Rules for classification: 1) Points; 2) Head-to-head points; 3) Head-to-head goal difference; 4) Goal difference; 5) Goals scored; 6) Play-off tie.
(P) Promoted

=== Egypt Cup ===
==== Final ====
30 August 2024
21:00 CAST

Pyramids	1–0	ZED
Mayele 87'	Report

Borg El Arab Stadium, Alexandria
Referee: Ahmed El Ghandour

=== Egyptian League Cup ===
==== Final ====
7 August 2024
21:00 CAST

Ceramica Cleopatra	3–1	Tala'ea El Gaish
Ebuka 13'; Tony 71'; Belhadji 76'	Report	K. Tarek 43'

30 June Stadium, Cairo
Attendance: 1,000
Referee: Radu Petrescu (Romania)

=== Egyptian Super Cup ===
==== Final ====
28 December 2023
21:00 GST

Al Ahly	4–2 (a.e.t.)	Modern Future
Kahraba 13'; El Shahat 34'; Modeste 114'; Fouad 116'	Report	El Said 76'; Mahmoud 81'

Mohammed bin Zayed Stadium, Abu Dhabi
Attendance: 30,000
Referee: Mohamed Adel
