= Tunisian Women's Basketball Super Cup =

- Organising body: Tunisia Basketball Federation
- Founded: 2014; 12 years ago
- First season: 2014
- Country: Tunisia
- Confederation: FIBA Africa
- Current champions: ASF Jemmal (1st title)
- Most championships: CS Sfaxien (3 titles)

The Tunisian Women's Basketball Super Cup or Women's Champions Trophy, is an annual basketball super cup in Tunisian men's basketball opposing the Tunisian Women's Division I champion to the winner of the Tunisian Women's Basketball Cup. CS Sfaxien are the record holders for most titles, with a total of three.

== Finals ==
Season	Champions	Final score	Runners-up
2014	CS Sfaxien	?–?	Unknown
2015–2017	Not played		
2018	CS Sfaxien	54–49	CSP Circulation
2019–2023	Not played		
2024	CS Sfaxien	67–55	JS Menazah
2025	ASF Jemmal	77–69	CS Sfaxien

== Champions ==
=== By Team ===
Team	City	Winners	Years winners
CS Sfaxien	Sfax	3	2014, 2018, 2024
ASF Jemmal	Jemmal	1	2025
