= 2023–24 Egyptian Third Division =

2023–24 season of Egyptian Third Division football league

Egyptian Third Division
- Season: 2023–24
- Dates: 7 October 2023 – 11 May 2024
- Promoted: Al Madina Al Monawara; MS Sohag; Al Badari; Tutankhamun; Diamond; Plastic Shubra El Kheima; Benha; Damietta; El Sharkia; Belqas City; Biyala; Horse Owners' Club; 6th of October; El Zohour; Al Jazeera
- Relegated: Sokar Qus; Girga; Abou Tig; MS Atsa; MS Sol; Helwan Cement; Almaza; MS Abou El Saoud; Fayed; Ashmoun; MS Abshish; MS Damietta City; MS Faraskur; Desouk; MS Qutur; MS El Maamora
- Disqualified or withdrawn: Nahdat El Amreya; MS Masr; Wydad Matruh; MS Siwa
- Matches: 1,498
- Goals: 3,727 (2.49 per match)

The 2023–24 Egyptian Third Division season was the 44th edition of the Egyptian Third Division, the second semi-professional level for football clubs in Egypt, and the fourth-tier league in the Egyptian football league system. Fixtures for the 2023–24 season were announced on 19 September 2023.

This was the league's first season after it became the fourth level of the Egyptian football league system, following the implementation of the new Second Division A and Second Division B leagues; the new second and third levels, respectively.

The season started on 7 October 2023, and concluded on 11 May 2024.

A total of 15 teams earned promotion to Second Division B, while 20 teams were relegated to Fourth Division, including teams that withdrawn or were disqualified after the season began.

== Teams ==
- Team name followed with ^{↓} indicates the team was relegated from the 2022–23 Egyptian Second Division.
- Team name followed with ^{↑} indicates the team was promoted from the 2022–23 Egyptian Fourth Division.
- 6th of October
- Abou Kasah
- Abou El Reesh
- Abou Sakal
- Abou Tig
- Al Ahly (El Gharaq)^{↑}
- Almaza
- Ashmoun
- Asyut
- Aviation Club^{↑}
- Al Badari
- Badr
- Bahtim
- Baltim
- Belbeis
- Benha
- Belqas City
- Beni Suef
- Bir Al Abd
- Biyala
- Borussia Egypt
- BWADC
- Cascada
- Damietta
- Desouk
- Diamond^{↑}
- DKWASC^{↑}
- Esco
- Faqous
- Fayed^{↑}
- Al Fayrouz
- El Gamarek
- Girga^{↑}
- Al Hamoul^{↑}
- Heliopolis^{↑}
- Helwan El Aam
- Helwan Cement^{↑}
- Al Hilal (Tahta)^{↑}
- Horse Owners' Club
- Ittihad Basyoun^{↑}
- Al Jazeera
- Kafr Bulin^{↑}
- Kapci^{↑}
- Al Maadi & Al Yacht
- Al Madina Al Monawara^{↓}
- Manshiyat El Shohada
- Manshiyat Naser
- Al Maragha
- El Marg
- Al Masry (El Salloum)^{↓}
- Matar Taris
- El Matareya^{↑}
- Matruh
- Media^{↓}
- Menouf
- Minyat El Nasr
- Mit Khalaf
- El Montaza
- MS Abou Homos^{↑}
- MS Abou El Matamir
- MS Abou El Namras
- MS Abou El Saoud^{↑}
- MS Abou Tisht
- MS Abou Zenima
- MS Abshish^{↑}
- MS Aga
- MS Amer Village^{↑}
- MS El Amreya^{↑}
- MS Atfih^{↑}
- MS Atsa
- MS Baloza^{↑}
- MS Bashtil^{↑}
- MS Basyoun^{↑}
- MS Batta
- MS El Dabaa
- MS Damietta City^{↑}
- MS El Delengat
- MS Diarb Negm^{↑}
- MS Edfu
- MS Esna
- MS Faiyum
- MS Faqous^{↑}
- MS Faraskur^{↑}
- MS El Hasaya^{↑}
- MS Ibshaway
- MS Itay El Baroud
- MS El Kherba
- MS El Maamora^{↑}
- MS Martyr Ahmed El Mansi
- MS Masr (Note: Club withdrew from the league after the start of the season.)
- MS Matai^{↑}
- MS Minyat Samanoud
- MS Naser Mallawi
- MS Qalyub^{↑}
- MS Qutur
- MS Salem El Hersh
- MS Sumusta^{↑}
- MS El Serw
- MS Sinnuris
- MS Siwa^{↑} (Note: Club withdrew from the league before the start of the season.)
- MS Sohag
- MS Sol
- MS Toukh
- MS El Tour
- MS El Wadi
- Nahdat El Amreya^{↑}
- Naser El Fekreia
- Al Nasr (Arish)
- Al Nasr (Sidi Barrani)^{↑}
- New Valley^{↑}
- El Nuba
- Orange^{↑}
- Othmason Tanta
- Plastic Shubra El Kheima
- Pyramids Gardens
- Qallin^{↑}
- El Qanater El Khairiya^{↑}
- Qeft
- Qena
- El Qusiya
- El Raja
- Ras El Bar
- Al Rebat & Al Anwar
- Sahel Selim^{↑}
- El Said (Giza)
- Sakha
- Al Salam (Esna)^{↑}
- El Salloum
- Samanoud
- El Senbellawein^{↑}
- Sers Al Layanah
- Al Shanwani^{↑}
- El Sharkia
- Sharm El Sheikh
- Sherbeen
- Shoban Badaway
- Shoban Al Maragha
- Sidi Salem
- Sohag
- Sokar Qus^{↑}
- Sporting Castle
- El Tahrir (Aswan)
- El Teram^{↑}
- Tutankhamun^{↑}
- Workers (Ras Gharib)^{↑}
- Wydad Matruh^{↑} (Note: Club disqualified from the league after the start of the season.)
- Al Zarka
- El Zohour

== Format ==
The league consists of 148 teams divided geographically into 13 groups, with each group containing a different number of teams, depending on clubs' hometowns:

- Group A, B, C and D for teams from Upper Egypt.
- Group E and F for teams from Greater Cairo.
- Group G for teams from north-eastern governorates and South Sinai.
- Group H, I and J for teams from central and northern governorates.
- Group K for teams from Alexandria and Beheira.
- Group L for teams from North Sinai.
- Group M for teams from Matruh.

The number of promoted and relegated teams differs from a group to another, according to the competition's regulation for the 2023–24 season.

The top team from each 13 group earns direct promotion to the Egyptian Second Division B. In group E, F, H, I, J and K, the bottom two teams are relegated to the Egyptian Fourth Division, while in group A, B, C, D, G, L and M, only the last-placed team face relegation, for a total of 19 teams.

Group G is split into two groups, G2 for teams from South Sinai, and G1 for the remainder teams. The top two teams from G1 advance to the promotion play-offs, alongside the first-placed team from G2, to decide the promoted team to Second Division B. Only the team finishing last in G1 are relegated, with no teams from G2 facing relegation.

== League tables ==
=== Group A ===
Pos	Team	Pld	W	D	L	GF	GA	GD	Pts	Promotion or relegation
1	Al Madina Al Monawara (P)	18	11	5	2	22	9	+13	38	Promotion to Second Division B
2	Qena	18	10	6	2	20	8	+12	36	
3	Al Salam (Esna)	18	6	6	6	19	20	−1	24 (Note: Teams are ranked on head-to-head record.)	
4	MS Edfu	18	7	3	8	22	23	−1	24	
5	Abou El Reesh	18	5	7	6	23	24	−1	22	
6	Qeft	18	4	9	5	18	20	−2	21	
7	El Tahrir (Aswan)	18	4	8	6	23	21	+2	20 (Note: Teams are ranked on head-to-head record.)	
8	MS Esna	18	5	5	8	11	17	−6	20	
9	MS El Hasaya	18	3	8	7	18	26	−8	17	
10	Sokar Qus (R)	18	3	7	8	12	20	−8	16	Relegation to Fourth Division

Source: EFA - Luxor branch
Rules for classification: 1) Points; 2) Head-to-head points; 3) Head-to-head goal difference; 4) Goal difference; 5) Goals scored; 6) Play-off tie.
(P) Promoted; (R) Relegated

=== Group B ===
Pos	Team	Pld	W	D	L	GF	GA	GD	Pts	Promotion or relegation
1	MS Sohag (P)	14	10	2	2	19	10	+9	32	Promotion to Second Division B
2	Sohag	14	9	3	2	20	5	+15	30	
3	Al Hilal (Tahta)	14	7	5	2	21	10	+11	26	
4	MS Abou Tisht	14	5	4	5	18	20	−2	19	
5	Shoban Al Maragha	14	3	5	6	14	15	−1	14	
6	Al Maragha	14	3	4	7	11	21	−10	13	
7	Workers (Ras Gharib)	14	2	4	8	18	21	−3	10	
8	Girga (R)	14	1	5	8	9	28	−19	8	Relegation to Fourth Division

Source: Hesham Mokhtar Karim
Rules for classification: 1) Points; 2) Head-to-head points; 3) Head-to-head goal difference; 4) Goal difference; 5) Goals scored; 6) Play-off tie.
(P) Promoted; (R) Relegated

=== Group C ===
Pos	Team	Pld	W	D	L	GF	GA	GD	Pts	Promotion or relegation
1	Al Badari (P)	16	7	6	3	17	14	+3	27	Promotion to Second Division B
2	New Valley	16	7	5	4	27	20	+7	26 (Note: Teams are ranked on head-to-head record.)	
3	MS Naser Mallawi	16	8	2	6	23	17	+6	26	
4	MS Matai	16	6	5	5	25	19	+6	23	
5	El Qusiya	16	5	6	5	19	18	+1	21	
6	Naser El Fekreia	16	5	4	7	20	20	0	19	
7	Sahel Selim	16	3	9	4	24	29	−5	18	
8	Asyut	16	3	7	6	14	18	−4	16	
9	Abou Tig (R)	16	3	6	7	14	28	−14	15	Relegation to Fourth Division

Source: EFA - Asyut branch
Rules for classification: 1) Points; 2) Head-to-head points; 3) Head-to-head goal difference; 4) Goal difference; 5) Goals scored; 6) Play-off tie.
(P) Promoted; (R) Relegated

=== Group D ===
Pos	Team	Pld	W	D	L	GF	GA	GD	Pts	Promotion or relegation
1	Tutankhamun (P)	18	16	1	1	52	10	+42	49	Promotion to Second Division B
2	Beni Suef	18	13	3	2	38	10	+28	42	
3	MS Sinnuris	18	12	2	4	48	30	+18	38	
4	Al Ahly (El Gharaq)	18	7	3	8	23	22	+1	24	
5	MS Faiyum	18	5	5	8	21	24	−3	20 (Note: Teams are ranked on head-to-head record.)	
6	MS Ibshaway	18	5	5	8	23	33	−10	20	
7	MS Sumusta	18	5	4	9	29	44	−15	19	
8	Abou Kasah	18	3	6	9	25	35	−10	15	
9	Matar Taris	18	3	4	11	19	51	−32	13	
10	MS Atsa (R)	18	3	3	12	15	34	−19	12	Relegation to Fourth Division

Source: EFA - Faiyum branch
Rules for classification: 1) Points; 2) Head-to-head points; 3) Head-to-head goal difference; 4) Goal difference; 5) Goals scored; 6) Play-off tie.
(P) Promoted; (R) Relegated

=== Group E ===
Pos	Team	Pld	W	D	L	GF	GA	GD	Pts	Promotion or relegation
1	Diamond (P)	26	21	2	3	63	13	+50	65	Promotion to Second Division B
2	Media	26	16	6	4	53	16	+37	54	
3	MS Bashtil	26	13	7	6	44	28	+16	46 (Note: Teams are ranked on head-to-head record.)	
4	Al Maadi & Al Yacht	26	13	7	6	44	27	+17	46	
5	Orange	26	12	7	7	31	17	+14	43	
6	Helwan El Aam	26	11	6	9	42	30	+12	39	
7	El Said (Giza)	26	10	7	9	35	28	+7	37	
8	Pyramids Gardens	26	8	10	8	35	21	+14	34	
9	Manshiyat Naser	26	9	5	12	48	47	+1	32	
10	MS Abou El Namras	26	9	4	13	28	40	−12	31	
11	MS Atfih	26	8	3	15	28	37	−9	27 (Note: Teams are ranked on head-to-head record.)	
12	Cascada	26	6	9	11	25	40	−15	27	
13	MS Sol (R)	26	4	9	13	32	48	−16	21	Relegation to Fourth Division
14	Helwan Cement (R)	26	1	0	25	17	133	−116	3	Relegation to Fourth Division

Source: EFA - Giza branch
Rules for classification: 1) Points; 2) Head-to-head points; 3) Head-to-head goal difference; 4) Goal difference; 5) Goals scored; 6) Play-off tie.
(P) Promoted; (R) Relegated

=== Group F ===
Pos	Team	Pld	W	D	L	GF	GA	GD	Pts	Promotion or relegation
1	Plastic Shubra El Kheima (P)	26	18	7	1	56	24	+32	61 (Note: Teams are ranked on head-to-head record.)	Promotion to Second Division B (Note: On 16 August 2024, the Egyptian Football Association announced the promotion of Benha and Al Jazeera to the Egyptian Second Division B due to administrative errors. This decision followed appeals by both teams against Plastic Shubra El Kheima and MS El Dabaa, respectively, who had fielded ineligible players during their second-leg matches. As the 2023–24 season had already concluded, the EFA was unable to award 2–0 victories or update league standings, prompting them to promote the affected teams, who would have topped their groups with the awarded points.)
2	Benha (P)	26	18	7	1	38	12	+26	61	Promotion to Second Division B
3	MS Toukh	26	15	7	4	46	19	+27	52	
4	El Marg	26	9	13	4	33	22	+11	40	
5	Aviation Club	26	11	5	10	31	25	+6	38	
6	Heliopolis	26	9	7	10	35	30	+5	34 (Note: Teams are ranked on head-to-head record.)	
7	MS Qalyub	26	7	13	6	17	16	+1	34	
8	Esco	26	7	10	9	24	28	−4	31	
9	El Matareya	26	7	8	11	23	25	−2	29	
10	El Qanater El Khairiya	26	6	10	10	20	30	−10	28	
11	Bahtim	26	6	9	11	23	24	−1	27	
12	MS Batta	26	6	7	13	24	43	−19	25	
13	Almaza (R)	26	5	6	15	21	40	−19	21	Relegation to Fourth Division
14	MS Abou El Saoud (R)	26	3	1	22	23	76	−53	10	Relegation to Fourth Division

Source: Mohamed Talaat
Rules for classification: 1) Points; 2) Head-to-head points; 3) Head-to-head goal difference; 4) Goal difference; 5) Goals scored; 6) Play-off tie.
(P) Promoted; (R) Relegated

=== Group G ===
==== Group G1 ====
Pos	Team	Pld	W	D	L	GF	GA	GD	Pts	Qualification or relegation
1	Damietta (O, P)	14	7	4	3	16	9	+7	25	Qualification for promotion play-offs
2	Al Rebat & Al Anwar	14	7	3	4	9	7	+2	24	Qualification for promotion play-offs
3	El Gamarek	14	6	5	3	12	8	+4	23	
4	Kapci	14	5	6	3	12	7	+5	21	
5	El Nuba	14	4	4	6	12	16	−4	16 (Note: Teams are ranked on head-to-head record.)	
6	MS Amer Village	14	4	4	6	21	19	+2	16	
7	Manshiyat El Shohada	14	4	4	6	14	21	−7	16	
8	Fayed (R)	14	2	4	8	6	15	−9	10	Relegation to Fourth Division

Source: Second Division B Media
Rules for classification: 1) Points; 2) Head-to-head points; 3) Head-to-head goal difference; 4) Goal difference; 5) Goals scored; 6) Play-off tie.
(O) Play-off winners; (P) Promoted; (R) Relegated

==== Group G2 ====
Pos	Team	Pld	W	D	L	GF	GA	GD	Pts	Qualification
1	Sharm El Sheikh	6	4	2	0	19	7	+12	14	Qualification for promotion play-offs
2	MS El Wadi	6	1	4	1	7	7	0	7 (Note: Teams are ranked on head-to-head record.)	
3	MS El Tour	6	1	4	1	6	9	−3	7	
4	MS Abou Zenima	6	0	2	4	5	14	−9	2	

Source: EFA - Port Said branch
Rules for classification: 1) Points; 2) Head-to-head points; 3) Head-to-head goal difference; 4) Goal difference; 5) Goals scored; 6) Play-off tie.

=== Group H ===
Pos	Team	Pld	W	D	L	GF	GA	GD	Pts	Promotion or relegation
1	El Sharkia (P)	22	15	4	3	43	15	+28	49	Promotion to Second Division B
2	Al Shanwani	22	12	10	0	32	9	+23	46	
3	Sers Al Layanah	22	10	9	3	24	14	+10	39	
4	MS Faqous	22	10	6	6	35	23	+12	36	
5	Borussia Egypt	22	10	4	8	27	28	−1	34	
6	Belbeis	22	8	9	5	28	21	+7	33	
7	Menouf	22	6	8	8	20	20	0	26	
8	MS Diarb Negm	22	5	8	9	17	28	−11	23	
9	Mit Khalaf	22	5	7	10	29	29	0	22 (Note: Teams are ranked on head-to-head record.)	
10	Faqous	22	5	7	10	23	40	−17	22	
11	Ashmoun (R)	22	4	7	11	32	36	−4	19	Relegation to Fourth Division
12	MS Abshish (R)	22	2	1	19	11	58	−47	7	Relegation to Fourth Division

Source: EFA - Sharkia branch
Rules for classification: 1) Points; 2) Head-to-head points; 3) Head-to-head goal difference; 4) Goal difference; 5) Goals scored; 6) Play-off tie.
(P) Promoted; (R) Relegated

=== Group I ===
Pos	Team	Pld	W	D	L	GF	GA	GD	Pts	Promotion or relegation
1	Belqas City (P)	24	17	4	3	44	19	+25	55	Promotion to Second Division B
2	Ras El Bar	24	16	6	2	42	19	+23	54	
3	Al Zarka	24	12	8	4	38	21	+17	44	
4	Minyat El Nasr	24	12	6	6	34	19	+15	42	
5	Sherbeen	24	12	5	7	41	24	+17	41	
6	Shoban Badaway	24	10	5	9	31	35	−4	35	
7	DKWASC	24	8	10	6	24	20	+4	34	
8	El Senbellawein	24	6	8	10	19	30	−11	26	
9	MS Minyat Samanoud	24	7	4	13	25	38	−13	25 (Note: Teams are ranked on head-to-head record.)	
10	MS El Serw	24	6	7	11	21	28	−7	25	
11	MS Aga	24	5	7	12	17	26	−9	22	
12	MS Damietta City (R)	24	5	3	16	19	45	−26	18	Relegation to Fourth Division
13	MS Faraskur (R)	24	3	1	20	13	44	−31	10	Relegation to Fourth Division

Source: EFA - Dakahlia branch
Rules for classification: 1) Points; 2) Head-to-head points; 3) Head-to-head goal difference; 4) Goal difference; 5) Goals scored; 6) Play-off tie.
(P) Promoted; (R) Relegated

=== Group J ===
Pos	Team	Pld	W	D	L	GF	GA	GD	Pts	Promotion or relegation
1	Biyala (P)	24	15	5	4	32	18	+14	50	Promotion to Second Division B
2	Baltim	24	13	7	4	33	12	+21	46	
3	Samanoud	24	12	9	3	30	15	+15	45	
4	MS Basyoun	24	11	7	6	28	17	+11	40	
5	Ittihad Basyoun	24	11	4	9	29	28	+1	37	
6	Othmason Tanta	24	9	5	10	36	31	+5	32	
7	Al Hamoul	24	7	8	9	23	26	−3	29	
8	Sakha	24	6	10	8	16	17	−1	28 (Note: Teams are ranked on head-to-head record.)	
9	Sporting Castle	24	7	7	10	21	27	−6	28	
10	Qallin	24	8	3	13	20	32	−12	27	
11	Sidi Salem	24	6	6	12	24	26	−2	24 (Note: Teams are ranked on head-to-head record.)	
12	Desouk (R)	24	6	6	12	24	38	−14	24	Relegation to Fourth Division
13	MS Qutur (R)	24	4	5	15	19	48	−29	17	Relegation to Fourth Division

Source: EFA - Gharbia branch
Rules for classification: 1) Points; 2) Head-to-head points; 3) Head-to-head goal difference; 4) Goal difference; 5) Goals scored; 6) Play-off tie.
(P) Promoted; (R) Relegated

=== Group K ===
Pos	Team	Pld	W	D	L	GF	GA	GD	Pts	Promotion or relegation
1	Horse Owners' Club (P)	23	12	8	3	34	18	+16	44	Promotion to Second Division B
2	MS Itay El Baroud	23	11	9	3	32	16	+16	42	
3	MS El Delengat	23	11	8	4	24	16	+8	41	
4	MS Abou El Matamir	23	11	6	6	38	25	+13	39	
5	El Teram	23	9	11	3	24	15	+9	38	
6	MS El Amreya	23	7	12	4	31	23	+8	33	
7	Kafr Bulin	23	8	7	8	25	27	−2	31	
8	MS Abou Homos	23	7	7	9	25	29	−4	28 (Note: Teams are ranked on head-to-head record.)	
9	El Montaza	23	8	4	11	20	28	−8	28	
10	Badr	23	5	8	10	28	33	−5	23	
11	BWADC	23	4	8	11	25	32	−7	20	
12	MS El Maamora (R)	23	3	6	14	21	36	−15	15	Relegation to Fourth Division
13	Nahdat El Amreya (R)	12	0	2	10	0	29	−29	2	Withdrawal (Note: On 4 January 2024, Nahdat El Amreya submitted a request to withdraw from the league after the first half of the season due to financial issues. The Egyptian Football Association confirmed the club's withdrawal on the next day, and that the club would be relegated to Fourth Division, per the competition's regulations.)

Source: EFA - Alexandria branch
Rules for classification: 1) Points; 2) Head-to-head points; 3) Head-to-head goal difference; 4) Goal difference; 5) Goals scored; 6) Play-off tie.
(P) Promoted; (R) Relegated

=== Group L ===
Pos	Team	Pld	W	D	L	GF	GA	GD	Pts	Promotion or relegation
1	6th of October (P)	17	12	3	2	33	14	+19	39	Promotion to Second Division B
2	MS Salem El Hersh	17	12	1	4	39	18	+21	37	
3	Al Nasr (Arish)	17	10	4	3	48	15	+33	34	
4	Abou Sakal	17	6	8	3	35	18	+17	26	
5	MS Martyr Ahmed El Mansi	17	7	1	9	29	31	−2	22	
6	MS El Kherba	17	5	6	6	27	35	−8	21	
7	MS Baloza	17	5	3	9	31	43	−12	18	
8	Al Fayrouz	17	3	7	7	23	29	−6	16	
9	Bir Al Abd	17	1	6	10	25	44	−19	9	
10	MS Masr (R)	9	0	1	8	7	50	−43	1	Withdrawal (Note: On 26 December 2023, the Egyptian Football Association announced that MS Masr withdrew from the league due to financial issues, and that the club would be relegated to Fourth Division, per the competition's regulations.)

Source: EFA - North Sinai branch
Rules for classification: 1) Points; 2) Head-to-head points; 3) Head-to-head goal difference; 4) Goal difference; 5) Goals scored; 6) Play-off tie.
(P) Promoted; (R) Relegated

=== Group M ===
Pos	Team	Pld	W	D	L	GF	GA	GD	Pts	Promotion or relegation
1	El Zohour (P)	15	9	4	2	35	13	+22	31	Promotion to Second Division B
2	El Raja	15	9	3	3	29	14	+15	30 (Note: Teams are ranked on head-to-head record.)	
3	Al Jazeera (P)	15	9	3	3	20	12	+8	30	Promotion to Second Division B (Note: On 16 August 2024, the Egyptian Football Association announced the promotion of Benha and Al Jazeera to the Egyptian Second Division B due to administrative errors. This decision followed appeals by both teams against Plastic Shubra El Kheima and MS El Dabaa, respectively, who had fielded ineligible players during their second-leg matches. As the 2023–24 season had already concluded, the EFA was unable to award 2–0 victories or update league standings, prompting them to promote the affected teams, who would have topped their groups with the awarded points.)
4	MS El Dabaa	15	8	3	4	27	18	+9	27	
5	El Salloum	15	5	4	6	30	29	+1	19	
6	Al Masry (El Salloum)	15	4	2	9	23	31	−8	14	
7	Matruh	15	2	7	6	20	26	−6	12 (Note: Teams are ranked on head-to-head record. The second match involving Matruh and Al Nasr (Sidi Barrani) was abandoned after a riot broke out between the players and technical staff of both teams, while the result of the match was 0–0. The Egyptian Football Association announced on 2 January 2024 that the match would be not replayed, and that the match points would be withheld from both teams; deducting one point from each team as a result.)	
8	Al Nasr (Sidi Barrani)	15	3	4	8	14	29	−15	12	
9	Wydad Matruh (D, R)	8	0	0	8	4	30	−26	0	Disqualified (Note: On 28 December 2023, the Egyptian Football Association announced that Wydad Matruh were disqualified from the league due to failing to attend their fixtures, and that the club would be relegated to Fourth Division.)
10	MS Siwa (R)	0	0	0	0	0	0	0	0	Withdrawal (Note: On 7 November 2023, the Egyptian Football Association announced that MS Siwa withdrew from the league, and that the club would be relegated to Fourth Division, per the competition's regulations.)

Source: El Zohour SC
Rules for classification: 1) Points; 2) Head-to-head points; 3) Head-to-head goal difference; 4) Goal difference; 5) Goals scored; 6) Play-off tie.
(D) Disqualified; (P) Promoted; (R) Relegated

== Play-offs ==
The draw for the play-off round was held on 21 February 2024, 13:00 local time (UTC+2), at the Egyptian Football Association headquarters, to decide the order of the fixtures. All matches were played at a neutral venue; specifically at Suez Petroleum Club Stadium in Suez.

Damietta won the play-offs and earned promotion to Second Division B.

=== Standings ===
Pos	Team	Pld	W	D	L	GF	GA	GD	Pts	Promotion
1	Damietta (P)	2	1	1	0	2	1	+1	4	Promotion to Second Division B
2	Al Rebat & Al Anwar	2	1	0	1	2	1	+1	3	
3	Sharm El Sheikh	2	0	1	1	1	3	−2	1	

Rules for classification: 1) Points; 2) Head-to-head points; 3) Head-to-head goal difference; 4) Goal difference; 5) Goals scored; 6) Play-off tie.
(P) Promoted

=== Matches ===
All times are CAT (UTC+2).

24 February 2024
14:30

Al Rebat & Al Anwar	0–1	Damietta

Suez Petroleum Club Stadium, Suez

2 March 2024
14:30

Damietta	1–1	Sharm El Sheikh

Suez Petroleum Club Stadium, Suez

9 March 2024
15:00

Sharm El Sheikh	0–2	Al Rebat & Al Anwar

Suez Petroleum Club Stadium, Suez
