= Arab Women's Club Basketball Championship =

Arab Club Basketball Championship
- Current season, competition or edition: 2026 Arab Women's Club Basketball Championship
- Sport: Basketball
- Founded: 1990
- First season: 1990
- No. of teams: 8
- Country: ABC member associations
- Continent: Arab world
- Most recent champion: (Egypt) Alexandria SC (3rd title) (2026)
- Most titles: (Tunisia) Stade Tunisien (4 titles)

The Arab Women's Club Championship is an annual basketball tournament for Arab women clubs. The competition was founded in 1990 by the Arab Basketball Confederation.

== Results ==
=== Tables ===
Year	Host	Final			Third place match		
Year	Host	Winner	Score	Runner-up	Third place	Score	Fourth place
1990; Details	Jordan	(Tunisia); Stade Tunisien		(Algeria); NA Hussein Dey	(Syria); Al-Thawra SC		(Iraq); Al-Shorta SC
1991; Details	Tunisia	(Tunisia); Stade Tunisien		(Syria); Al-Hurriya SC	(Tunisia); Al-Hilal Tunis		(Egypt); Alexandria SC
1992; Details	Syria	(Egypt); Alexandria SC		(Syria); Jalaa SC	(Tunisia); Al-Hilal Tunis		(Tunisia); Stade Tunisien
1993; Details	Egypt	(Tunisia); Al-Hilal Tunis		(Egypt); Shooting Club	(Tunisia); CS Sfaxien		(Egypt); Alexandria SC
1994	Not held						
1995; Details	Egypt	(Tunisia); Stade Tunisien		(Tunisia); Al-Hilal Tunis	(Egypt); Al Ahly		(Lebanon); Homenetmen Beirut
1996; Details	Lebanon	(Egypt); Al Ahly		(Tunisia); Stade Tunisien	(Lebanon); Homenetmen Beirut		(Egypt); Alexandria SC
1997; Details	Tunisia	(Tunisia); Stade Tunisien		(Tunisia); Al-Hilal Tunis	(Lebanon); Homenetmen Beirut		(Tunisia); CS Sfaxien
1998; Details	Lebanon	(Egypt); Alexandria SC		(Tunisia); CS Sfaxien	(Tunisia); CS Sfaxien		(Tunisia); Stade Tunisien
1999; Details	Lebanon	(Tunisia); CS Sfaxien		(Egypt); Al Ahly	(Tunisia); CS Police de Circulation		(Egypt); Alexandria SC
2000; Details	United Arab Emirates	(Tunisia); CS Sfaxien		(Tunisia); Zitouna Sports	(Egypt); Al Ahly		(Tunisia); CS Police de Circulation
2001; Details	Egypt	(Tunisia); CS Police de Circulation		(Egypt); Alexandria SC	(Tunisia); CS Sfaxien		(Algeria); OC Alger
2002; Details	Lebanon	(Lebanon); Hekmeh BC	85–62	(Egypt); Al Ahly	(Egypt); Alexandria SC		(Tunisia); CS Sfaxien
2003	Not held						
2004	Not held						
2005	Not held						
2006; Details	United Arab Emirates (Dubai)	(Lebanon); Antranik SC	76–59	(Syria); Al-Wahda Damascus	(Algeria); OC Alger	85–69	(Egypt); Alexandria SC
2007; Details	Morocco	(Lebanon); Antranik SC		(Tunisia); CS Sfaxien	(Morocco); FAR Rabat		(Algeria); AS PTT Alger
2008	Not held						
2009	Not held						
2010; Details	Morocco (Rabat)	(Tunisia); ES Cap Bon	68–58	(Egypt); Gezira	(Egypt); Alexandria SC	76–29	(Morocco); ASE Essaouira
2011	Not held						
2012	Not held						
2013	Not held						
2014; Details	Egypt (Alexandria)	(Lebanon); Al Riyadi	84–75	(Egypt); Alexandria SC	(Algeria); GSP Alger	70–61	(Jordan); Orthodox
2015; Details	Egypt	(Lebanon); Al Riyadi	70–50	(Egypt); Club Assayd	(Algeria); GSP Alger		(Tunisia); ES Cap Bon
2016; Details	Jordan	(Algeria); GSP Alger	without playoffs	(Jordan); Shabab Al-Fuheis	(Egypt); Club Assayd	without playoffs	(Algeria); NA Hussein Dey
2017; Details	Lebanon	(Lebanon); Homenetmen Beirut	61–50	(Tunisia); CS Sfaxien	(Jordan); Shabab Al-Fuheis		(Egypt); Olympie
2018; Details	Egypt	(Lebanon); Homenetmen Beirut	83–57	(Egypt); Al Ahly	(Jordan); Shabab Al-Fuheis	76–69	(Tunisia); ES Cap Bon
2019; Details	Morocco	(Lebanon); Beirut Club	66–54	(Tunisia); ES Cap Bon	(Algeria); GSP Alger	66–59	(Jordan); Shabab Al-Fuheis
2020	Not held due to COVID-19 pandemic						
2021; Details	Lebanon	(Lebanon); Beirut Club	69–64	(Syria); Al-Thawra SC	(Jordan); Shabab Al-Fuheis	76–61	(Jordan); Orthodox Club
2022; Details	Tunisia (Nabeul)	(Lebanon); Beirut Club	69–64	(Egypt); Smouha SC	(Tunisia); ES Cap Bon	75–73	(Jordan); Shabab Al-Fuheis
2023; Details	Morocco (Marrakesh)	(Morocco); KAC Marrakech	71–51	(Algeria); GS Cosider	(Somalia); Gift Stars		
2024; Details	Jordan (Fuheis)	(Jordan); Shabab Al-Fuheis	84–60	(Saudi Arabia); Al‑Ula	(Kuwait); Al‑Fatat	75–86	(Algeria); GS Cosider
2025; 2025	Saudi Arabia Medina	(Jordan); Shabab Al-Fuheis	66–58	(Algeria); GS Cosider	(Kuwait); Al‑Fatat	92–79	(Saudi Arabia); Al‑Ula
2026; Details	Egypt Alexandria	(Egypt); Alexandria SC	73–65	(Egypt); Al Ahly	(Kuwait); Al‑Fatat	80–74	(Egypt); Gezira

=== Titles by team ===
Team	Champion	Runner-up
(Tunisia) Stade Tunisien	4 (1990, 1991, 1995, 1997)	1 (1996)
(Egypt) Alexandria SC	3 (1992, 1998, 2026)	2 (2001, 2014)
(Lebanon) Beirut Club	3 (2019, 2021, 2022)	
(Tunisia) CS Sfaxien	2 (1999, 2000)	3 (1998, 2007, 2017)
(Jordan) Shabab Al-Fuheis	2 (2024, 2025)	1 (2016)
(Lebanon) Antranik SC	2 (2006, 2007)	
(Lebanon) Al Riyadi	2 (2014, 2015)	
(Lebanon) Homenetmen Beirut	2 (2017, 2018)	
(Egypt) Al Ahly	1 (1996)	4 (1999, 2002, 2018, 2026)
(Tunisia) Al-Hilal Tunis	1 (1993)	2 (1995, 1997)
(Tunisia) ES Cap Bon	1 (2010)	1 (2019)
(Tunisia) CS Police de Circulation	1 (2001)	
(Lebanon) Hekmeh BC	1 (2002)	
(Algeria) MC Alger	1 (2016)	
(Morocco) KAC Marrakech	1 (2023)	
(Algeria) GS Cosider		2 (2023, 2025)
(Algeria) NA Hussein Dey		1 (1990)
(Syria) Al-Hurriya SC		1 (1991)
(Syria) Jalaa SC		1 (1992)
(Egypt) Shooting Club		1 (1993)
(Tunisia) Zitouna Sports		1 (2000)
(Syria) Al-Wahda Damascus		1 (2006)
(Egypt) Gezira		1 (2010)
(Egypt) Club Assayd		1 (2015)
(Syria) Al-Thawra SC		1 (2021)
(Egypt) Smouha SC		1 (2022)
(Saudi Arabia) Al‑Ula		1 (2024)

- MC Alger (ex. GS Pétroliers).

=== Titles by country ===
Nation	Champion	Runner-up	Third place	Total
Lebanon	10	0	2	12
Tunisia	9	8	7	24
Egypt	4	10	5	19
Jordan	2	1	3	6
Algeria	1	3	4	8
Morocco	1	0	1	2
Syria	0	4	1	5
Saudi Arabia	0	1	0	1
Kuwait	0	0	3	3
Somalia	0	0	1	1

== See also ==
- Arab Club Basketball Championship
