= 2024–25 Egyptian Second Division B =

Egyptian Second Division B
- Season: 2024–25
- Dates: 9 October 2024 – 25 May 2025
- Promoted: FC Masar; El Entag El Harby; Maleyat Kafr El Zayat
- Relegated: KIMA Aswan; Al Wasta; South Sinai; Plastic Shubra El Kheima; Damietta; Al Jazeera
- Matches: 642
- Goals: 1,375 (2.14 per match)
- All statistics correct as of 27 February 2025. (Note: Total goals scored include two awarded goals)

The 2024–25 Egyptian Second Division B season is the second edition of the Egyptian Second Division B, the third-highest level in the Egyptian football league system, since its formation in 2023. Fixtures for the 2024–25 season were announced on 10–12 September 2024, following the draw for each region.

The season started on 9 October 2024, and concluded on 25 May 2025.

== Format ==
The league consists of 65 teams divided into six groups: one group of 12 teams, three groups of 11 teams and two group of 10 teams, with each group covering different parts of Egypt:

- Group A and B for teams from Upper Egypt and eastern governorates.
- Group C and D for teams from Greater Cairo, and central and north-eastern governorates.
- Group E and F for teams from Alexandria and northern governorates.

The format for the 2024–25 season was adjusted from the previous season, with the changes being confirmed on 26 September 2024, after the new regulations were released.

All teams in each group play each other twice, home and away. The top three teams from each group advance to the promotion play-offs, forming three groups of six teams each, with each group covering a different region. The first-placed team in each group in the promotion play-off round earns promotion to the Egyptian Second Division A next season.

Teams finishing bottom in each group during the regular season face relegation to the Egyptian Third Division.

== Teams ==
- Team name followed with ^{↓} indicates the team was relegated from the 2023–24 Egyptian Second Division A.
- Team name followed with ^{↑} indicates the team was promoted from the 2023–24 Egyptian Third Division.

The participating teams include 15 teams promoted from the Egyptian Third Division and six teams relegated from the Egyptian Second Division A. Originally, only 13 teams were promoted from the Third Division, but due to administrative errors, the Egyptian Football Association made a decision on 16 August 2024 to promote two additional teams, Benha and Al Jazeera, following appeals from both clubs.

Group	Group A	Group B	Group C	Group D	Group E	Group F
Teams	Al Aluminium; KIMA Aswan; Luxor; Al Madina Al Monawara^{↑}; Makadi^{↓}; MS Sohag^{↑}; Muslim Youths (Qena); Al Nasr Lel Taa'den^{↓}; Qus; Tahta	Asyut Cement; Al Badari^{↑}; Beni Mazar; Egypt Stars; Faiyum; FC Masar^{↑} (Note: The club was known as Tutankhamun FC prior to the start of the 2024–25 season, but they underwent a rebranding and changed their name to FC Masar on 25 September 2024.); El Minya; Misr Lel Makkasa^{↓}; MS Tamya; Telephonat Beni Suef; Al Wasta	6th of October^{↑}; Al Merreikh; Al Mostaqbal; Al Nasr; Al Obour; Port Fouad; El Shams; El Sharkia^{↑}; Sinai Star; South Sinai	Alo Egypt; Benha^{↑}; Diamond^{↑}; Eastern Company; El Entag El Harby; Gomhoriat Shebin^{↓}; Ittihad El Shorta; Misr Insurance; Nogoom^{↓}; Plastic Shubra El Kheima^{↑}; Team FC	Belqas City^{↑}; Beni Ebeid; Biyala^{↑}; Damietta^{↑}; Dikernis^{↓}; Ittihad Nabarouh; Kafr El Sheikh; Maleyat Kafr El Zayat; MS El Kazazin; MS Tala; Pioneers; Said El Mahalla	Ala'ab Damanhour; Delphi; Fleet Club; Al Hammam; Al Hilal (El Dabaa); Horse Owners' Club^{↑}; Al Jazeera^{↑}; Al Magd; MS Koum Hamada; Olympic Club; El Zohour^{↑}

== League tables ==
=== Group A ===
Pos	Team	Pld	W	D	L	GF	GA	GD	Pts	Qualification or relegation
1	Al Nasr Lel Taa'den	18	9	6	3	19	13	+6	33	Qualification for promotion play-offs
2	Luxor	18	8	7	3	27	21	+6	31 (Note: Teams are ranked on head-to-head record.)	Qualification for promotion play-offs
3	Al Madina Al Monawara	18	8	7	3	22	16	+6	31	Qualification for promotion play-offs
4	Al Aluminium	18	8	5	5	25	16	+9	29	
5	Tahta	18	4	8	6	18	18	0	20 (Note: Teams are ranked on head-to-head record.)	
6	Qus	18	4	8	6	14	22	−8	20	
7	Muslim Youths (Qena)	18	4	7	7	13	17	−4	19	
8	Makadi	18	3	9	6	12	14	−2	18 (Note: Teams are ranked on head-to-head record.)	
9	MS Sohag	18	4	6	8	19	25	−6	18	
10	KIMA Aswan (R)	18	5	3	10	14	21	−7	18	Relegation to Third Division

Source: Media B
Rules for classification: 1) Points; 2) Head-to-head points; 3) Head-to-head goal difference; 4) Goal difference; 5) Goals scored; 6) Play-off tie.
(R) Relegated

=== Group B ===
Pos	Team	Pld	W	D	L	GF	GA	GD	Pts	Qualification or relegation
1	FC Masar	20	14	4	2	39	16	+23	46	Qualification for promotion play-offs
2	Asyut Cement	20	12	4	4	30	15	+15	40	Qualification for promotion play-offs
3	Misr Lel Makkasa	20	12	3	5	25	14	+11	39	Qualification for promotion play-offs
4	Egypt Stars	20	11	4	5	27	19	+8	37	
5	Telephonat Beni Suef	20	5	11	4	19	17	+2	26	
6	El Minya	20	6	7	7	23	21	+2	25	
7	Al Badari	20	6	4	10	20	23	−3	22	
8	Faiyum	20	6	2	12	18	29	−11	20	
9	MS Tamya	20	6	1	13	21	39	−18	19	
10	Beni Mazar	20	4	4	12	18	31	−13	16 (Note: Teams are ranked on head-to-head record.)	
11	Al Wasta (R)	20	4	4	12	20	36	−16	16	Relegation to Third Division

Source: Media B
Rules for classification: 1) Points; 2) Head-to-head points; 3) Head-to-head goal difference; 4) Goal difference; 5) Goals scored; 6) Play-off tie.
(R) Relegated

=== Group C ===
Pos	Team	Pld	W	D	L	GF	GA	GD	Pts	Qualification or relegation
1	Al Obour	18	11	5	2	29	14	+15	38	Qualification for promotion play-offs
2	Al Nasr	18	10	5	3	31	14	+17	35	Qualification for promotion play-offs
3	Port Fouad	18	8	8	2	19	13	+6	32	Qualification for promotion play-offs
4	Al Merreikh	18	8	7	3	20	14	+6	31	
5	Al Mostaqbal	18	6	7	5	16	17	−1	25	
6	El Shams	18	5	8	5	17	17	0	23	
7	El Sharkia	18	5	7	6	23	20	+3	22	
8	6th of October	18	3	6	9	18	26	−8	15	
9	Sinai Star	18	2	4	12	13	30	−17	10	
10	South Sinai (R)	18	1	5	12	9	30	−21	8	Relegation to Third Division

Source: Media B
Rules for classification: 1) Points; 2) Head-to-head points; 3) Head-to-head goal difference; 4) Goal difference; 5) Goals scored; 6) Play-off tie.
(R) Relegated

=== Group D ===
Pos	Team	Pld	W	D	L	GF	GA	GD	Pts	Qualification or relegation
1	El Entag El Harby	20	11	7	2	31	15	+16	40	Qualification for promotion play-offs
2	Gomhoriat Shebin	20	9	8	3	21	13	+8	35	Qualification for promotion play-offs
3	Team FC	20	8	9	3	29	22	+7	33	Qualification for promotion play-offs
4	Eastern Company	20	7	10	3	31	21	+10	31	
5	Misr Insurance	20	7	7	6	15	17	−2	28	
6	Ittihad El Shorta	20	7	6	7	25	23	+2	27 (Note: Teams are ranked on head-to-head record.)	
7	Diamond	20	8	3	9	26	27	−1	27	
8	Nogoom	20	7	5	8	23	24	−1	26	
9	Benha	20	5	7	8	19	25	−6	22	
10	Alo Egypt	20	4	4	12	17	29	−12	16	
11	Plastic Shubra El Kheima (R)	20	0	8	12	12	33	−21	8	Relegation to Third Division

Source: Media B
Rules for classification: 1) Points; 2) Head-to-head points; 3) Head-to-head goal difference; 4) Goal difference; 5) Goals scored; 6) Play-off tie.
(R) Relegated

=== Group E ===
Pos	Team	Pld	W	D	L	GF	GA	GD	Pts	Qualification or relegation
1	Maleyat Kafr El Zayat	22	12	8	2	30	11	+19	44	Qualification for promotion play-offs
2	MS El Kazazin	22	10	8	4	26	11	+15	38	Qualification for promotion play-offs
3	MS Tala	22	8	13	1	23	14	+9	37	Qualification for promotion play-offs
4	Pioneers	22	8	10	4	25	13	+12	34	
5	Kafr El Sheikh	22	7	10	5	21	17	+4	31 (Note: Teams are ranked on head-to-head record.)	
6	Said El Mahalla	22	8	7	7	21	23	−2	31	
7	Dikernis	22	7	8	7	20	21	−1	29 (Note: Teams are ranked on head-to-head record.)	
8	Ittihad Nabarouh	22	6	11	5	19	20	−1	29	
9	Biyala	22	7	6	9	24	28	−4	27	
10	Belqas City	22	5	9	8	21	24	−3	24	
11	Beni Ebeid	22	4	6	12	16	28	−12	18	
12	Damietta (R)	22	0	4	18	10	46	−36	4	Relegation to Third Division

Source: Media B
Rules for classification: 1) Points; 2) Head-to-head points; 3) Head-to-head goal difference; 4) Goal difference; 5) Goals scored; 6) Play-off tie.
(R) Relegated

=== Group F ===
Pos	Team	Pld	W	D	L	GF	GA	GD	Pts	Qualification or relegation
1	Olympic Club	20	13	6	1	36	9	+27	45	Qualification for promotion play-offs
2	Delphi	20	10	8	2	26	9	+17	38	Qualification for promotion play-offs
3	Ala'ab Damanhour	20	10	7	3	22	11	+11	37	Qualification for promotion play-offs
4	Fleet Club	20	10	5	5	29	18	+11	35	
5	Al Magd	20	7	6	7	15	16	−1	27	
6	MS Koum Hamada	20	5	10	5	17	14	+3	25 (Note: Teams are ranked on head-to-head record.)	
7	Horse Owners' Club	20	6	7	7	24	30	−6	25	
8	Al Hilal (El Dabaa)	20	4	7	9	20	24	−4	19	
9	Al Hammam	20	3	9	8	14	23	−9	18	
10	El Zohour	20	3	5	12	15	40	−25	14	
11	Al Jazeera (R)	20	2	4	14	14	38	−24	10	Relegation to Third Division

Source: Media B
Rules for classification: 1) Points; 2) Head-to-head points; 3) Head-to-head goal difference; 4) Goal difference; 5) Goals scored; 6) Play-off tie.
(R) Relegated

== Play-offs ==
=== Promotion Group A ===
Pos	Team	Pld	W	D	L	GF	GA	GD	Pts	Promotion
1	FC Masar (P)	10	9	1	0	24	4	+20	28	Promotion to Second Division A
2	Asyut Cement	10	7	2	1	20	7	+13	23	
3	Misr Lel Makkasa	10	4	2	4	17	15	+2	14	
4	Al Nasr Lel Taa'den	10	2	2	6	3	12	−9	8	
5	Al Madina Al Monawara	10	2	1	7	6	11	−5	7	
6	Luxor	10	2	0	8	6	27	−21	6	

Source: Kora B
Rules for classification: 1) Points; 2) Head-to-head points; 3) Head-to-head goal difference; 4) Goal difference; 5) Goals scored; 6) Play-off tie.
(P) Promoted

=== Promotion Group B ===
Pos	Team	Pld	W	D	L	GF	GA	GD	Pts	Promotion
1	El Entag El Harby (P)	10	6	4	0	12	4	+8	22	Promotion to Second Division A
2	Port Fouad	10	6	2	2	18	9	+9	20	
3	Team FC	10	5	3	2	19	13	+6	18	
4	Al Obour	10	4	3	3	11	12	−1	15	
5	Al Nasr	10	1	1	8	9	19	−10	4 (Note: Teams are ranked on head-to-head record.)	
6	Gomhoriat Shebin	10	1	1	8	7	19	−12	4	

Source: Kora B
Rules for classification: 1) Points; 2) Head-to-head points; 3) Head-to-head goal difference; 4) Goal difference; 5) Goals scored; 6) Play-off tie.
(P) Promoted

=== Promotion Group C ===
Pos	Team	Pld	W	D	L	GF	GA	GD	Pts	Promotion
1	Maleyat Kafr El Zayat (P)	10	6	4	0	16	5	+11	22	Promotion to Second Division A
2	Delphi	10	5	3	2	10	8	+2	18	
3	Ala'ab Damanhour	10	3	4	3	10	8	+2	13 (Note: Teams are ranked on head-to-head record.)	
4	Olympic Club	10	3	4	3	7	8	−1	13	
5	MS Tala	10	2	4	4	11	13	−2	10	
6	MS El Kazazin	10	0	3	7	3	15	−12	3	

Source: Kora B
Rules for classification: 1) Points; 2) Head-to-head points; 3) Head-to-head goal difference; 4) Goal difference; 5) Goals scored; 6) Play-off tie.
(P) Promoted

== Number of teams by governorate ==
Number of teams	Governorate	Team(s)
9	Cairo	Alo Egypt, Diamond, El Entag El Harby, FC Masar, Ittihad El Shorta, Al Mostaqbal, Al Nasr, El Shams and Team FC
5	Alexandria	Delphi, Fleet Club, Horse Owners' Club, Al Magd and Olympic Club
5	Dakahlia	Belqas City, Beni Ebeid, Dikernis, Ittihad Nabarouh and Pioneers
4	Matrouh	Al Hammam, Al Hilal (El Dabaa), Al Jazeera and El Zohour
3	Beni Suef	Egypt Stars, Telephonat Beni Suef and Al Wasta
3	Faiyum	Faiyum, Misr Lel Makkasa and MS Tamya
3	Giza	Eastern Company, Misr Insurance and Nogoom
3	Qalyubia	Benha, Al Obour and Plastic Shubra El Kheima
3	Qena	Al Aluminium, Muslim Youths (Qena) and Qus
2	Aswan	KIMA Aswan and Al Nasr Lel Taa'den
2	Asyut	Asyut Cement and Al Badari
2	Beheira	Ala'ab Damanhour and MS Koum Hamada
2	Damietta	Damietta and MS El Kazazin
2	Gharbia	Maleyat Kafr El Zayat and Said El Mahalla
2	Kafr El Sheikh	Biyala and Kafr El Sheikh
2	Luxor	Luxor and Al Madina Al Monawara
2	Minya	Beni Mazar and El Minya
2	Monufia	Gomhoriat Shebin and MS Tala
2	North Sinai	6th of October and Sinai Star
2	Port Said	Al Merreikh and Port Fouad
2	Sohag	MS Sohag and Tahta
1	Red Sea	Makadi
1	Sharkia	El Sharkia
1	South Sinai	South Sinai
