= Tunisian Women's Division I Basketball League =

Tunisian Women's Division I
- Organising body: Tunisia Basketball Federation
- Founded: 1955; 71 years ago
- First season: 1955–56
- Country: Tunisia
- Confederation: FIBA Africa
- Current champions: CS Sfaxien (22nd title) (2025–26)
- Most championships: CS Sfaxien (22 titles)

The Tunisian Women's Division I, is the highest tier women's professional basketball league in Tunisia, established in 1955. As the 2025–26 season, the league features 12 teams. The league is organised by the Tunisia Basketball Federation (FTBB).

CS Sfaxien is the record holder for most titles, with a total of twenty-one. The current champion is CS Sfaxien, who won the title in the 2024–25 season.

== Teams ==
=== 2025–26 teams ===
The following 12 teams are the teams for the 2025–26 season:

Club	City
Al Hilal Sports	Tunis
AS Dar Chaabane	Dar Chaabane
ASF Jemmal	Jemmal
CSF Bizerte	Bizerte
CS Sfaxien	Sfax
ES Cap Bon	Nabeul
ES Sahel	Sousse
ESF Rades	Radès
CA GAS	Tunis
JS Menazah	El Menzah
Stade Tunisien	Le Bardo
Zitouna Sports	Tunis

== Champions ==
=== By Year ===
- 1955–56: Stade Gaulois
- 1956–57: Stade Gaulois
- 1957–58: No Competition
- 1958–59: CA GAS
- 1959–60: ES Tunis
- 1960–61: ES Tunis
- 1961–62: ES Tunis
- 1962–63: ASF Tunis
- 1963–64: ASF Tunis
- 1964–65: ASF Tunis
- 1965–66: CSF Bizerte
- 1966–67: Olympique de Béja
- 1967–68: ASF Tunis
- 1968–69: ES Radès
- 1969–70: ASF Tunis
- 1970–71: Ezzahra Sports
- 1971–72: Ezzahra Sports
- 1972–73: Ezzahra Sports
- 1973–74: Zitouna Sports
- 1974–75: Zitouna Sports
- 1975–76: Zitouna Sports
- 1976–77: Zitouna Sports
- 1977–78: Zitouna Sports
- 1978–79: Zitouna Sports
- 1979–80: Zitouna Sports
- 1980–81: Zitouna Sports
- 1981–82: ES Tunis
- 1982–83: ES Tunis
- 1983–84: ES Tunis
- 1984–85: JS Bougatfa
- 1985–86: Stade Tunisien
- 1986–87: Stade Tunisien
- 1987–88: Stade Tunisien
- 1988–89: Stade Tunisien
- 1989–90: Al Hilal Sports
- 1990–91: Stade Tunisien
- 1991–92: CS Sfaxien
- 1992–93: Al Hilal Sports
- 1993–94: Stade Tunisien
- 1994–95: Al Hilal Sports
- 1995–96: Al Hilal Sports
- 1996–97: CS Sfaxien
- 1997–98: CS Sfaxien
- 1998–99: CS Sfaxien
- 1999–00: Stade Tunisien
- 2000–01: CS Sfaxien
- 2001–02: CS Sfaxien
- 2002–03: CS Sfaxien
- 2003–04: CS Sfaxien
- 2004–05: CS Sfaxien
- 2005–06: CS Sfaxien
- 2006–07: CS Sfaxien
- 2007–08: ES Cap Bon
- 2008–09: CSF Bizerte
- 2009–10: CS Sfaxien
- 2010–11: CS Sfaxien
- 2011–12: CS Sfaxien
- 2012–13: CS Sfaxien
- 2013–14: CS Sfaxien
- 2014–15: CS Sfaxien
- 2015–16: CS Sfaxien
- 2016–17: ASF Jemmal
- 2017–18: ES Sahel
- 2018–19: CS Sfaxien
- 2019–20: Stade Tunisien
- 2020–21: Ezzahra Sports
- 2021–22: ES Cap Bon
- 2022–23: ASF Jemmal
- 2023–24: CS Sfaxien
- 2024–25: CS Sfaxien
- 2025–26: CS Sfaxien

=== By Team ===
Team	City	Winners	Years winners
CS Sfaxien	Sfax	22	1991–92, 1996–97, 1997–98, 1998–99, 2000–01, 2001–02, 2002–03, 2003–04, 2004–05, 2005–06, 2006–07, 2009–10, 2010–11, 2011–12, 2012–13, 2013–14, 2014–15, 2015–16, 2018–19, 2023–24, 2024–25, 2025–26
Stade Tunisien	Le Bardo	8	1985–86, 1986–87, 1987–88, 1988–89, 1990–91, 1993–94, 1999–00, 2019–20
Zitouna Sports	Tunis	8	1973–74, 1974–75, 1975–76, 1976–77, 1977–78, 1978–79, 1979–80, 1980–81
ES Tunis	Tunis	6	1959–60, 1960–61, 1961–62, 1981–82, 1982–83, 1983–84
ASF Tunis	Tunis	5	1962–63, 1963–64, 1964–65, 1967–68, 1969–70
Al Hilal Sports	Tunis	4	1989–90, 1992–93, 1994–95, 1995–96
Ezzahra Sports	Ezzahra	4	1970–71, 1971–72, 1972–73, 2020–21
CSF Bizerte	Bizerte	2	1965–66, 2008–09
Stade Gaulois	Tunis	2	1955–56, 1956–57
ES Cap Bon	Nabeul	2	2007–08, 2021–22
ASF Jemmal	Jemmal	2	2016–17, 2022–23
ES Sahel	Sousse	1	2017–18
JS Bougatfa	Bougatfa	1	1984–85
ES Radès	Radès	1	1968–69
Olympique de Béja	Béja	1	1966–67
CA GAS	Tunis	1	1958–59
