= Tunisian Women's Basketball Cup =

- Organising body: Tunisia Basketball Federation
- Founded: 1965; 61 years ago
- First season: 1965–66
- Country: Tunisia
- Confederation: FIBA Africa
- Current champions: CS Sfaxien (8th title) (2025–26)
- Most championships: Zitouna Sports (13 titles)

The Tunisian Women's Basketball Cup, is the premier knockout women's basketball competition in Tunisia, established in 1965. The tournament is organised by the Tunisia Basketball Federation (FTBB).

Zitouna Sports are the record holders for most titles, with a total of thirteen. The current champion is CS Sfaxien, who won the title in the 2025–26 season.

== Champions ==
=== By Year ===
- 1965–66: Zitouna Sports
- 1966–67: CS Coopération
- 1967–68: ES Radès
- 1968–69: ES Radès
- 1969–70: Ezzahra Sports
- 1970–71: Zitouna Sports
- 1971–72: ASF Tunis
- 1972–73: Zitouna Sports
- 1973–74: Zitouna Sports
- 1974–75: Zitouna Sports
- 1975–76: ASF Tunis
- 1976–77: Zitouna Sports
- 1977–78: Zitouna Sports
- 1978–79: Zitouna Sports
- 1979–80: Zitouna Sports
- 1980–81: Zitouna Sports
- 1981–82: Stade Tunisien
- 1982–83: ES Tunis
- 1983–84: ES Tunis
- 1984–85: Stade Tunisien
- 1985–86: JS Bougatfa
- 1986–87: JS Bougatfa
- 1987–88: ES Tunis
- 1988–89: Stade Tunisien
- 1989–90: Al Hilal Sports
- 1990–91: Stade Tunisien
- 1991–92: Al Hilal Sports
- 1992–93: Al Hilal Sports
- 1993–94: Stade Tunisien
- 1994–95: Stade Tunisien
- 1995–96: Stade Tunisien
- 1996–97: Zitouna Sports
- 1997–98: CS Sfaxien
- 1998–99: Zitouna Sports
- 1999–00: Stade Tunisien
- 2000–01: Stade Tunisien
- 2001–02: CS Sfaxien
- 2002–03: CSP Circulation
- 2003–04: Zitouna Sports
- 2004–05: CS Sfaxien
- 2005–06: CS Sfaxien
- 2006–07: CS Sfaxien
- 2007–08: ES Cap Bon
- 2008–09: CS Sfaxien
- 2009–10: ES Cap Bon
- 2010–11: DS Grombalia
- 2011–12: CSP Circulation
- 2012–13: CS Sfaxien
- 2013–14: CSP Circulation
- 2014–15: ES Cap Bon
- 2015–16: ES Cap Bon
- 2016–17: CSP Circulation
- 2017–18: CSP Circulation
- 2018–19: CSP Circulation
- 2019–20: ES Cap Bon
- 2020–21: Ezzahra Sports
- 2021–22: ES Cap Bon
- 2022–23: JS Menazah
- 2023–24: JS Menazah
- 2024–25: ASF Jemmal
- 2025–26: CS Sfaxien

=== By Team ===
Team	City	Winners	Years winners
Zitouna Sports	Tunis	13	1965–66, 1970–71, 1972–73, 1973–74, 1974–75, 1976–77, 1977–78, 1978–79, 1979–80, 1980–81, 1996–97, 1998–99, 2003–04
Stade Tunisien	Tunis	9	1981–82, 1984–85, 1988–89, 1990–91, 1993–94, 1994–95, 1995–96, 1999–00, 2000–01
CS Sfaxien	Sfax	8	1997–98, 2001–02, 2004–05, 2005–06, 2006–07, 2008–09, 2012–13, 2025–26
CSP Circulation	Tunis	6	2002–03, 2011–12, 2013–14, 2016–17, 2017–18, 2018–19
ES Cap Bon	Nabeul	6	2007–08, 2009–10, 2014–15, 2015–16, 2019–20, 2021–22
Al Hilal Sports	Tunis	3	1989–90, 1991–92, 1992–93
ES Tunis	Tunis	3	1982–83, 1983–84, 1987–88
JS Bougatfa	Tunis	2	1985–86, 1986–87
ASF Tunis	Tunis	2	1971–72, 1975–76
ES Radès	Radès	2	1967–68, 1968–69
Ezzahra Sports	Ezzahra	2	1969–70, 2020–21
JS Menazah	El Menzah	2	2022–23, 2023–24
DS Grombalia	Grombalia	1	2010–11
CS Coopération	Tunis	1	1966–67
ASF Jemmal	Jemmal	1	2024–25
