= CS Sfaxien Women's Basketball =

CS Sfaxien WBC
- Nickname: Juventus El Arab
- Leagues: Tunisian League
- Founded: 1928
- Arena: Salle Raed Bejaoui
- Capacity: 5,000
- Location: Sfax, Tunisia
- Team colors
- Championships: 22 Tunisian Leagues; 8 Tunisian Cups
- Website: http://www.css.org.tn/
Home	Away

The Club Sportif Sfaxien Women's Basketball Club or in ( Arabic language : النادي الرياضي الصفاقسي لكرة السلة للسيدات ) is a Tunisian women's professional basketball club from Sfax and one of CS Sfaxien Women's main Section, The club currently plays in the Tunisian Women's Division I Basketball League Top division. The Salle Raed Bejaoui is their home.

== Honours ==
CS Sfaxien won a total of 30 local titles :

- Tunisian League 22 times:

Years : 1992, 1997, 1998, 1999, 2001, 2002, 2003, 2004, 2005, 2006, 2007, 2010, 2011, 2012, 2013, 2014, 2015, 2016, 2019 , 2024 , 2025 , 2026

- Tunisian Basketball Cup 8 times:

Years : 1998, 2002, 2005, 2006, 2007, 2009, 2013, 2026

CS Sfaxien won a total of 2 Arabs titles :

- Arab Clubs Championship 2 times :

Years : 1999, 2000
Finalist : 1998, 2007, 2017

== Current squad ==
CS Sfaxien WBC roster
Players
Coaches

Pos.	No.	Nat.	Name	Ht.
G		(Tunisia)	[[ | ]]	1.83 m (6 ft 0 in)	33 – 16 January 1993
G		(Tunisia)	[[ | ]]	1.91 m (6 ft 3 in)
G		(Tunisia)	[[ | ]]	1.97 m (6 ft 6 in)	44 – 12 April 1982
SG		(Tunisia)	[[ | ]]	1.89 m (6 ft 2 in)	39 – 19 September 1986
SG		(Tunisia)	[[ | ]]	1.90 m (6 ft 3 in)	37 – 22 August 1989
SF		(Tunisia)	[[ | ]]	1.89 m (6 ft 2 in)	43 – 8 June 1983
G/F		(Tunisia)	[[ | ]] (C)	2.00 m (6 ft 7 in)	44 – 5 October 1981
PF		(Tunisia)	[[ | ]]	2.06 m (6 ft 9 in)	40 – 27 April 1986
F		(Tunisia)	[[ | ]]	2.10 m (6 ft 11 in)	43 – 24 November 1982
F		(Tunisia)	[[ | ]]	1.95 m (6 ft 5 in)	34 – 5 July 1992
C		(Tunisia)	[[ | ]]	2.01 m (6 ft 7 in)	42 – 18 August 1984

Head coach

- (Tunisia)

Assistant coach(es)

- (Tunisia)

Legend

- (C) Team captain
- Injured

== Coaches ==
Nat.	Name	Years

== See also ==
- CS Sfaxien
- CS Sfaxien (volleyball)
- CS Sfaxien Women's Volleyball
