= Egyptian Shooting Club =

- Founded: 25 February 1938
- Based in: Giza, Egypt
- President: Abdullah Ghorab
- Website: www.egyptianshootingclub.com

Egyptian Shooting Club (Arabic: نادي الصيد المصري, Nadi El Said) is an Egyptian club based in Giza, Egypt with several branches in Dokki, 6th of October City, Katamya, Port Said . The original idea of the club was to provide an area for all Egyptian shooters to express their hobby. It was founded in 1938 by a royal decree from King Farouk I of Egypt and then was called The Royal Egyptian Shooting Club. The first president of the club was a cousin of Farouk, Prince Soliman Daoud. The club has its own football team that is participating in the Egyptian Third Division.
