= Al Madina Al Monawara SC =

Egyptian football club

Al Madina Al Monawara
- Full name: Al Madina Al Monawara Sporting Club
- Short name: MAD
- Founded: 1977; 49 years ago
- League: Egyptian Second Division

Al Madina Al Monawara Sporting Club (Arabic: نادي المدينة المنورة للألعاب الرياضية) is an Egyptian football club based in Luxor. The club currently plays in the Egyptian Second Division, the second-highest league in the Egyptian football league system.
