= 2023–24 Egyptian Second Division A =

Egyptian Second Division A
- Season: 2023–24
- Dates: 24 September 2023 – 9 May 2024 (regular season); 22 May – 26 June 2024 (play-offs)
- Champions: Petrojet; 1st title
- Promoted: Petrojet; Ghazl El Mahalla; Haras El Hodoud
- Relegated: Dikernis; Makadi; Gomhoriat Shebin; Nogoom; Misr Lel Makkasa; Al Nasr Lel Taa'den
- Matches: 280
- Goals: 623 (2.23 per match)
- Biggest home win: Abou Qir Fertilizers 5–0 Al Nasr Lel Taa'den (13 November 2023)
- Biggest away win: Nogoom 0–3 El Qanah (9 October 2023); Misr Lel Makkasa 0–3 La Viena (8 January 2024); Misr Lel Makkasa 0–3 Tanta (29 January 2024)
- Highest scoring: Haras El Hodoud 6–2 Misr Lel Makkasa (20 November 2023)
- (Note: All statistics do not include play-offs round)

The 2023–24 Egyptian Second Division A season was the inaugural edition of the Egyptian Second Division A, the new second-highest level in the Egyptian football league system. It succeeded the old Egyptian Second Division, which was abolished and replaced with the new Second Division A and Second Division B as the new second and third-tier leagues, respectively, with the latter retaining the format used by the abolished league. Fixtures for the 2023–24 season were announced on 22 August 2023.

The season started on 24 September 2023, and concluded on 26 June 2024.

Petrojet were crowned champions of the first edition of the league with three matches to spare, following a 3–0 win over Raya Ghazl Kafr El Dawar on 16 April 2024, and secured promotion back to the Egyptian Premier League after a four-year absence. They were joined by Ghazl El Mahalla (runners-up) and Haras El Hodoud (promotion play-offs winners), who both suffered an immediate return to the league after getting relegated in the previous season.

== Format ==
The league consist of 20 teams in one group. The final format was confirmed by Egyptian Football Association board member Ehab El Komy on 8 August 2023, after changes were made to the initial format announced on 19 June 2023.

The season is separated into two phases: In the first phase, teams face each other only once in a single-leg tie, then the league split into two groups. Phase two consist of a promotion group for teams finishing from first to tenth, and a relegation group for teams finishing from 11th to 20th in the first phase. The top two teams in the promotion group earn promotion to the Egyptian Premier League, while the third-placed team play against the three play-off winners from the 2023–24 Egyptian Second Division B in a four-team play-off round, to decide the third promoted team to the Premier League. This means that there's a chance for Second Division B sides to skip a level and earn promotion directly to the Premier League without playing in the Second Division A. Teams finishing in the bottom six in the relegation group face relegation to the Second Division B. Later, it was announced that this season's format is exceptional, and will change in the next season.

== Teams ==
Locations of the 2023–24 Egyptian Second Division A teams
Locations of Egyptian Second Division A teams from Greater Cairo (Cairo and Giza)
- Team name followed with ^{↓} indicates the team was relegated from the 2022–23 Egyptian Premier League.
- Team name followed with ^{↔} indicates the team was promoted from the 2022–23 Egyptian Second Division.
- Team name followed with ^{↑} indicates the team was promoted from the 2022–23 Egyptian Third Division.

Three teams were relegated from the Premier League, three teams were promoted from the third division through promotion play-offs, while the remaining 14 teams secured their spot through the second division.

=== Stadiums and locations ===
Team	Location	Stadium (Note: Main stadiums for the 2023–24 season are listed only. Clubs are allowed to play selected matches at alternative venues; whether due to unavailability, security concerns, or other reasons. For example, Asyut Petroleum, a team from Asyut, may play some home games at Asyut University Stadium, instead of their regular home stadium, Asyut Petroleum Stadium.)	Capacity	2022–23 season
Abou Qir Fertilizers^{↔}	Abou Qir	Abou Qir Fertilizers Stadium	3,000	4th in Second Division Group C
Aswan^{↓}	Aswan (Corniche Nile)	Aswan Stadium	11,000	16th in Premier League
Asyut Petroleum^{↔}	Manfalut	Asyut Petroleum Stadium	6,000	3rd in Second Division Group A
Dikernis^{↔}	Dikernis	Hamdino Abdel Galil Stadium	8,000	3rd in Second Division Group C
Ghazl El Mahalla^{↓}	El Mahalla El Kubra	Ghazl El Mahalla Stadium	14,564	17th in Premier League
Gomhoriat Shebin^{↔}	Shebin El Kom	Gomhoriat Shebin Stadium	6,000	5th in Second Division Group C
Haras El Hodoud^{↓}	Mahatet El Raml	Haras El Hodoud Stadium	22,000	18th in Premier League
La Viena^{↔}	Meidum	Al Assiouty Sport Resort	6,000	2nd in Second Division Group A
Makadi^{↑}	Hurghada	Khaled Bichara Stadium	12,000	1st in Third Division Promotion Group A (Note: Makadi finished 1st in Group B in Third Division regular season.)
Misr Lel Makkasa^{↔}	Faiyum (Ibshway)	Beni Suef Stadium	10,000	5th in Second Division Group A
Al Nasr Lel Taa'den^{↔}	Edfu	Al Nasr Lel Taa'den Stadium	4,000	4th in Second Division Group A
Nogoom^{↑}	6th of October	Al Solaimaneyah Club Stadium	3,000	1st in Third Division Promotion Group B (Note: Nogoom finished 1st in Group E in Third Division regular season.)
Petrojet^{↔}	Suez (Faisal)	Cairo Military Academy Stadium	28,500	5th in Second Division Group B
Proxy^{↔}	Abou El Matamir	Proxy Work Stadium	4,000	1st in Second Division Play-offs (Note: Proxy finished 6th in Group C in Second Division regular season.)
El Qanah^{↔}	Ismailia (Sheikh Zayed)	Suez Canal Stadium	22,000	4th in Second Division Group B
Raya Ghazl Kafr El Dawar^{↑}	Kafr El Dawar	Haras El Hodoud Stadium	22,000	1st in Third Division Promotion Group C (Note: Raya Ghazl Kafr El Dawar finished 1st in Group J in Third Division regular season.)
El Sekka El Hadid^{↔}	Nasr City	El Sekka El Hadid Stadium	25,000	3rd in Second Division Group B
Tanta^{↔}	Tanta	Tanta Club Stadium	9,000	2nd in Second Division Group C
Telecom Egypt^{↔}	Maadi	Al Salam Stadium	30,000	2nd in Second Division Play-offs (Note: Telecom Egypt finished 6th in Group B in Second Division regular season.)
Wadi Degla^{↔}	Zahraa El Maadi	Al Salam Stadium	30,000	2nd in Second Division Group B

== League table ==
Pos	Team	Pld	W	D	L	GF	GA	GD	Pts	Promotion, qualification or relegation
1	Petrojet (C, P)	28	19	7	2	50	21	+29	64	Promotion to Premier League
2	Ghazl El Mahalla (P)	28	13	13	2	35	18	+17	52	Promotion to Premier League
3	Haras El Hodoud (O, P)	28	11	16	1	34	22	+12	49	Qualification for promotion play-offs
4	La Viena	28	13	9	6	42	25	+17	48	
5	Wadi Degla	28	11	13	4	36	24	+12	46	
6	Tanta	28	11	6	11	30	27	+3	39	
7	El Sekka El Hadid	28	8	14	6	29	24	+5	38 (Note: Head-to-head points: El Sekka El Hadid 4, Raya Ghazl Kafr El Dawar 1.)	
8	Raya Ghazl Kafr El Dawar	28	8	14	6	27	28	−1	38	
9	Proxy	28	9	10	9	28	35	−7	37	
10	El Qanah	28	9	9	10	27	23	+4	36	
11	Abou Qir Fertilizers	28	13	9	6	34	21	+13	48	
12	Asyut Petroleum	28	10	11	7	29	26	+3	41	
13	Telecom Egypt	28	11	6	11	33	29	+4	39	
14	Aswan	28	10	8	10	31	28	+3	38	
15	Dikernis (R)	28	9	9	10	31	35	−4	36	Relegation to Second Division B
16	Makadi (R)	28	5	12	11	31	36	−5	27	Relegation to Second Division B
17	Gomhoriat Shebin (R)	28	6	7	15	20	37	−17	25	Relegation to Second Division B
18	Nogoom (R)	28	4	8	16	22	44	−22	20	Relegation to Second Division B
19	Al Nasr Lel Taa'den (R)	28	2	6	20	26	54	−28	12 (Note: Head-to-head points: Al Nasr Lel Taa'den 4, Misr Lel Makkasa 1.)	Relegation to Second Division B
20	Misr Lel Makkasa (R)	28	3	3	22	28	66	−38	12	Relegation to Second Division B

Source: Soccerway (regular season), Soccerway (promotion round), Soccerway (relegation round)
Rules for classification: 1) Points; 2) Head-to-head points; 3) Head-to-head goal difference; 4) Goal difference; 5) Goals scored; 6) Play-off tie.
(C) Champions; (O) Play-off winners; (P) Promoted; (R) Relegated

== Results ==
=== Regular season ===
Home \ Away	AQF	ASW	ASP	DIK	GMH	GOM	HRS	LAV	MAK	MMK	NLT	NOG	PET	PRO	QAN	RAY	SKH	TAN	TEG	WDG
Abou Qir Fertilizers	—	—	—	0–0	—	2–0	—	—	—	—	5–0	0–2	1–3	1–1	—	0–0	1–0	2–1	—	1–1
Aswan	0–0	—	0–0	—	2–0	1–2	—	—	3–2	4–1	—	2–0	—	0–1	—	—	1–0	1–3	—	—
Asyut Petroleum	2–1	—	—	—	1–0	2–0	—	—	1–0	3–2	—	1–0	—	0–1	0–2	—	0–1	0–0	—	—
Dikernis	—	1–0	2–0	—	—	—	1–1	—	—	3–1	—	3–2	—	0–0	—	—	0–1	1–1	1–3	—
Ghazl El Mahalla	2–0	—	—	2–0	—	—	1–1	2–1	1–1	—	1–0	—	1–1	—	2–1	0–0	—	—	—	0–0
Gomhoriat Shebin	—	—	—	2–1	0–1	—	—	0–0	1–1	—	3–2	—	0–1	—	0–1	1–2	—	—	—	0–0
Haras El Hodoud	1–0	1–1	3–1	—	—	1–0	—	—	—	6–2	—	1–0	—	1–1	—	—	0–0	3–1	1–0	—
La Viena	0–0	2–2	1–1	3–0	—	—	2–2	—	—	—	3–0	—	3–2	—	—	2–0	—	—	1–0	3–4
Makadi	2–1	—	—	2–2	—	—	1–1	0–1	—	—	0–0	—	0–1	—	2–1	1–2	—	—	1–1	0–0
Misr Lel Makkasa	0–2	—	—	—	1–2	1–0	—	0–3	2–1	—	—	1–1	—	3–3	0–1	—	0–1	0–3	—	—
Al Nasr Lel Taa'den	—	1–1	1–3	0–1	—	—	1–2	—	—	1–1	—	—	1–2	—	—	—	2–3	2–1	0–1	—
Nogoom	—	—	—	—	0–1	1–1	—	2–1	0–0	—	2–1	—	0–1	—	0–3	1–1	—	—	—	1–2
Petrojet	—	2–0	1–0	3–0	—	—	4–0	—	—	2–1	—	—	—	3–0	—	—	1–1	2–1	2–1	—
Proxy	—	—	—	—	2–2	3–0	—	0–1	2–1	—	2–1	2–1	—	—	2–2	2–1	—	—	—	1–2
El Qanah	0–0	1–1	—	2–0	—	—	1–1	2–1	—	—	1–0	—	1–2	—	—	0–0	—	—	2–2	0–2
Raya Ghazl Kafr El Dawar	—	0–0	1–1	2–2	—	—	0–0	—	—	4–0	2–1	—	1–0	—	—	—	—	—	2–1	1–1
El Sekka El Hadid	—	—	—	—	1–1	0–0	—	0–0	1–1	—	—	4–0	—	0–0	0–0	2–2	—	—	—	0–0
Tanta	—	—	—	—	0–0	1–0	—	0–2 (Note: La Viena were awarded a 2–0 win after Tanta fielded an illegible player. The match originally ended 1–1.)	2–1	—	—	2–1	—	4–0	1–0	1–0	1–1	—	—	—
Telecom Egypt	1–2	1–0	2–3	—	0–2	4–0	—	—	—	2–1	—	1–0	—	0–0	—	—	2–4	1–0	—	—
Wadi Degla	—	2–0	2–1	3–1	—	—	1–2	—	—	2–1	3–0	—	1–1	—	—	—	—	0–0	1–0	—

Source: Soccerway
Legend: Blue = home team win; Yellow = draw; Red = away team win.

=== Promotion round ===
Home \ Away	GMH	HRS	LAV	PET	PRO	QAN	RAY	SKH	TAN	WDG
Ghazl El Mahalla	—	—	2–1	2–2	—	2–0	0–0	—	3–0	—
Haras El Hodoud	1–1	—	0–0	—	—	0–0	1–1	—	—	1–1
La Viena	—	—	—	1–1	2–0	—	—	2–2	2–0	—
Petrojet	—	1–1	—	—	—	—	3–0	—	2–1	3–1
Proxy	1–3	0–1	—	1–1	—	—	—	—	1–0	1–0
El Qanah	—	—	0–1	0–1	2–0	—	—	3–0	—	—
Raya Ghazl Kafr El Dawar	—	—	2–1	—	1–1	1–0	—	0–2	—	—
El Sekka El Hadid	1–1	0–0	—	1–2	2–0	—	—	—	0–0	—
Tanta	—	0–1	—	—	—	1–0	3–0	—	—	1–1
Wadi Degla	0–0	—	1–2	—	—	1–1	1–1	3–1	—	—

Source: Soccerway
Legend: Blue = home team win; Yellow = draw; Red = away team win.

=== Relegation round ===
Home \ Away	AQF	ASW	ASP	DIK	GOM	MAK	MMK	NLT	NOG	TEG
Abou Qir Fertilizers	—	—	—	—	—	2–1	3–1	3–1	1–0	2–1
Aswan	0–0	—	—	1–0	—	1–2	—	—	3–0	—
Asyut Petroleum	1–1	2–0	—	1–1	—	0–0	—	2–2	—	—
Dikernis	0–2	—	—	—	—	3–1	—	—	4–0	0–0
Gomhoriat Shebin	0–1	1–2	0–0	1–1	—	—	—	2–1	—	—
Makadi	—	—	—	—	2–1	—	4–1	2–2	0–0	2–3
Misr Lel Makkasa	—	1–2	1–2	1–2	1–3	—	—	—	—	—
Al Nasr Lel Taa'den	—	1–3	—	0–1	—	—	3–1	—	2–2	0–1
Nogoom	—	—	1–1	—	1–2	—	3–2	—	—	1–1
Telecom Egypt	—	1–0	0–0	—	3–0	—	0–1	—	—	—

Source: Soccerway
Legend: Blue = home team win; Yellow = draw; Red = away team win.

=== Positions by round ===
The following tables list the positions of teams after each week of matches. In order to preserve chronological involvements, any postponed matches are not included in the round at which they were originally scheduled, but added to the full round they were played immediately afterwards. For example, if a match is scheduled for matchday 11, but then postponed and played between matchdays 14 and 15, it will be added to the standings for day 14.

Team ╲ Round	1	2	3	4	5	6	7	8	9	10	11	12	13	14	15	16	17	18	19	20	21	22	23	24	25	26	27	28
Petrojet	3	2	1	3	1	2	1	1	3	2	1	1	1	1	1	1	1	1	1	1	1	1	1	1	1	1	1	1
Ghazl El Mahalla	5	6	3	2	2	4	3	5	4	3	5	4	3	4	3	4	5	4	4	3	3	3	3	2	2	2	2	2
Haras El Hodoud	6	7	4	4	5	6	5	4	1	4	2	2	2	2	2	3	3	3	3	4	4	4	4	5	5	5	3	3
La Viena	10	3	2	1	4	1	2	2	5	5	3	3	4	5	6	5	4	5	5	5	5	5	5	3	3	3	4	4
Wadi Degla	4	5	7	9	8	5	4	3	2	1	4	5	5	3	4	2	2	2	2	2	2	2	2	4	4	4	5	5
Tanta	7	12	10	12	15	9	14	10	10	9	9	11	13	11	10	8	7	8	6	8	7	8	7	7	7	6	6	6
El Sekka El Hadid	13	8	6	8	7	14	8	11	12	7	7	6	9	9	8	7	8	9	7	6	6	6	6	6	6	7	7	7
Raya Ghazl Kafr El Dawar	17	15	16	11	14	10	12	13	8	10	10	8	7	8	9	10	10	7	10	10	9	7	8	8	8	8	8	8
Proxy	8	4	9	10	6	11	15	16	14	12	14	12	12	10	11	11	11	10	8	7	8	9	9	9	9	9	9	9
El Qanah	9	14	8	5	3	3	6	7	9	11	11	9	8	6	7	9	9	11	9	9	10	10	10	10	10	10	10	10
Abou Qir Fertilizers	15	10	15	14	10	7	9	6	7	8	8	10	14	14	15	15	12	12	12	12	12	12	12	11	11	11	11	11
Asyut Petroleum	1	9	12	7	12	8	13	8	6	6	6	7	6	7	5	6	6	6	11	11	11	11	11	12	12	12	12	12
Telecom Egypt	2	1	5	6	11	12	7	9	15	16	12	14	11	13	14	12	13	14	13	13	14	14	13	14	14	13	13	13
Aswan	20	11	14	17	16	13	16	14	16	14	13	15	10	12	13	14	14	13	14	15	13	13	14	13	13	14	14	14
Dikernis	18	16	11	15	9	15	10	12	13	15	16	13	15	15	12	13	15	15	15	14	15	15	15	15	15	15	15	15
Makadi	11	13	13	13	13	16	11	15	11	13	15	16	16	16	16	16	16	16	16	17	17	16	17	16	17	17	16	16
Gomhoriat Shebin	16	20	19	16	18	18	18	19	19	19	19	19	17	18	18	18	17	17	17	16	16	17	16	17	16	16	17	17
Nogoom	12	17	20	20	19	17	17	18	17	18	17	18	19	17	17	17	18	18	18	18	18	18	18	18	18	18	18	18
Al Nasr Lel Taa'den	19	19	18	19	17	19	19	20	20	20	20	20	20	20	20	20	20	20	20	20	20	20	20	20	20	20	20	19
Misr Lel Makkasa	14	18	17	18	20	20	20	17	18	17	18	17	18	19	19	19	19	19	19	19	19	19	19	19	19	19	19	20

Promotion to Premier League
Advance to the play-offs
Relegation to Second Division B

Source: Soccerway

== Play-offs ==
The draw for the play-off round was held on 15 May 2024, 13:00 local time (UTC+3), at the Egyptian Football Association headquarters, to decide the order of the fixtures. The play-offs consist of the third-placed team in the league, alongside the three winners of the Second Division B promotion play-offs.

Teams play each other twice, home and away.

=== Standings ===
Pos	Team	Pld	W	D	L	GF	GA	GD	Pts	Promotion or qualification
1	Haras El Hodoud (P)	6	4	1	1	8	5	+3	13	Promotion to Premier League
2	Sporting Alexandria	6	2	2	2	5	7	−2	8 (Note: Head-to-head points: Sporting Alexandria 4, Suez 1.)	Participation in Second Division A
3	Suez	6	2	2	2	4	4	0	8	Participation in Second Division A
4	Tersana	6	1	1	4	6	7	−1	4	Participation in Second Division A

Source: Soccerway
Rules for classification: 1) Points; 2) Head-to-head points; 3) Head-to-head goal difference; 4) Goal difference; 5) Goals scored; 6) Play-off.
(Note: Head-to-head records are used for final standings only)
(P) Promoted

=== Matches ===
All times are CAST (UTC+3).

22 May 2024
17:00

Tersana	2–3	Haras El Hodoud
Otu 31' (pen.); El Attar 78'	Report	Mostafa 12'; Abou Gouda 45+2'; Mamdouh 60'

Hassan El Shazly Stadium, Giza
Referee: Mahmoud El Banna
22 May 2024
17:00

Sporting Alexandria	1–0	Suez
El Sayed 62'	Report

Haras El Hodoud Stadium, Alexandria (Note: Sporting Alexandria played their home matches at Haras El Hodoud Stadium, instead of their regular stadium Alexandria Sporting Club Stadium, both located in Alexandria.)
Referee: Mohamed Salama

2 June 2024
17:00

Haras El Hodoud	0–0	Sporting Alexandria
	Report

Haras El Hodoud Stadium, Alexandria
Referee: Amin Omar
2 June 2024
17:00

Suez	0–0	Tersana
	Report

Egyptian Army Stadium, Suez
Referee: Mohamed Adel

7 June 2024
17:00

Tersana	3–0	Sporting Alexandria
Otu 41' (pen.); Shalata 85', 90+3'	Report

Hassan El Shazly Stadium, Giza
Referee: Mohamed Maarouf
7 June 2024
17:00

Haras El Hodoud	1–0	Suez
Samir 16'	Report

Haras El Hodoud Stadium, Alexandria
Referee: Tarek Magdy

12 June 2024
17:00

Sporting Alexandria	1–0	Tersana
El Sewisi 55'	Report

Haras El Hodoud Stadium, Alexandria
Referee: Mohamed Youssef
12 June 2024
17:00

Suez	1–0	Haras El Hodoud
Yakubu 3'	Report

Egyptian Army Stadium, Suez
Referee: Nader Kamar El Dawla

20 June 2024
17:30

Haras El Hodoud	2–1	Tersana
Abou Gouda 60'; Mostafa 90+3'	Report	Dahi 52'

Haras El Hodoud Stadium, Alexandria
Referee: Ahmed El Ghandour
20 June 2024
17:30

Suez	2–2	Sporting Alexandria
Ibrahim 45+5'; Sallam 47'	Report	Abdel Halim 64'; El Sayed 82'

Egyptian Army Stadium, Suez
Referee: Mahmoud El Banna

26 June 2024
17:30

Sporting Alexandria	1–2	Haras El Hodoud
El Sayed 64'	Report	El Sharkawy 45'; Mamdouh 90+6'

Haras El Hodoud Stadium, Alexandria
Referee: Mohamed Adel
26 June 2024
17:30

Tersana	0–1	Suez
	Report	Saleh 73'

Hassan El Shazly Stadium, Giza
Referee: Shahenda El Maghrabi

== Number of teams by governorate ==
Number of teams	Governorate	Team(s)
3	Cairo	El Sekka El Hadid, Telecom Egypt and Wadi Degla
2	Alexandria	Abou Qir Fertilizers and Haras El Hodoud
2	Aswan	Aswan and Al Nasr Lel Taa'den
2	Beheira	Proxy and Raya Ghazl Kafr El Dawar
2	Gharbia	Ghazl El Mahalla and Tanta
1	Asyut	Asyut Petroleum
1	Beni Suef	La Viena
1	Dakahlia	Dikernis
1	Faiyum	Misr Lel Makkasa
1	Giza	Nogoom
1	Ismailia	El Qanah
1	Monufia	Gomhoriat Shebin
1	Red Sea	Makadi
1	Suez	Petrojet
