= 2024–25 Egyptian Second Division A =

Egyptian Second Division A
- Season: 2024–25
- Dates: 7 October 2024 – 31 May 2025
- Champions: Al Mokawloon Al Arab (1st title)
- Promoted: Al Mokawloon Al Arab; Wadi Degla; Kahraba Ismailia
- Relegated: La Viena; Sporting Alexandria; Suez
- Matches: 380
- Goals: 714 (1.88 per match)
- Biggest home win: Kahraba Ismailia 5–0 Asyut Petroleum (8 January 2025)
- Biggest away win: Suez 0–5 El Qanah (13 October 2024)
- Highest scoring: Tanta 3–5 Al Mokawloon Al Arab (23 December 2024)
- All statistics correct as of 31 May 2025.

The 2024–25 Egyptian Second Division A season was the second edition of the Egyptian Second Division A, the second-highest professional level in the Egyptian football league system, since its formation in 2023. Fixtures for the 2024–25 season were announced on 1 September 2024.

The season started on 7 October 2024, and concluded on 31 May 2025.

== Format ==
Per the Egyptian Football Association decision made on 9 August 2023, the 2024–25 edition's format differs from the previous season. The league consists of 20 teams in one group, with all teams playing each other twice, home and away, for a total of thirty-eight matches. The first-placed team is crowned champions of the league, and earns promotions to the Egyptian Premier League alongside the runners-up and third-placed team, while the bottom three teams face relegation to the Egyptian Second Division B.

On May 18, 2025, the Egyptian Pro League Association confirmed that four teams will be promoted from the second division to the Premier League for the following season. However, only three teams were promoted to the Premier League.

== Teams ==
Locations of the 2024–25 Egyptian Second Division A teams
- Team name followed with ^{↓} indicates the team was relegated from the 2023–24 Egyptian Premier League.
- Team name followed with ^{↑} indicates the team was promoted from the 2023–24 Egyptian Second Division B.

=== Stadiums and locations ===
| Team | Location | Stadium (Note: Main stadiums for the 2024–25 season are listed only. Clubs are allowed to play selected matches at alternative venues; whether due to unavailability, security concerns, or other reasons. For example, Asyut Petroleum, a team from Asyut, may play some home games at Asyut University Stadium, instead of their regular home stadium, Asyut Petroleum Stadium.) | Capacity | 2023–24 season |
|---|---|---|---|---|
| Abou Qir Fertilizers | Abou Qir | Alexandria Stadium | 19,676 | 11th in Second Division A |
| Aswan | Aswan (Corniche Nile) | Aswan Stadium | 11,000 | 14th in Second Division A |
| Asyut Petroleum | Manfalut | Asyut Petroleum Stadium | 6,000 | 12th in Second Division A |
| Baladiyat El Mahalla^{↓} | El Mahalla El Kubra | Baladiyat El Mahalla Stadium | 8,000 | 16th in Premier League |
| El Dakhleya^{↓} | El Nozha | Police Academy Stadium | 12,000 | 18th in Premier League |
| Dayrout^{↑} | Dayrout | 30 June Stadium - subfield no.1 | 2,000 | 1st in Second Division B Group A |
| Kahraba Ismailia^{↑} | Ismailia (Abou Sultan) | Kahraba Ismailia Stadium | 6,000 | 1st in Second Division B Group D |
| La Viena | Meidum | Al Assiouty Sport Resort | 6,000 | 4th in Second Division A |
| El Mansoura^{↑} | El Mansoura | Sherbeen Stadium | 4,000 | 1st in Second Division B Group E |
| Al Mokawloon Al Arab^{↓} | Abageyah | Osman Ahmed Osman Stadium | 35,000 | 17th in Premier League |
| Proxy | Abou El Matamir | Proxy Work Stadium | 4,000 | 9th in Second Division A |
| El Qanah | Ismailia (Sheikh Zayed) | Suez Canal Stadium | 22,000 | 10th in Second Division A |
| Raya Ghazl Kafr El Dawar | Kafr El Dawar | Haras El Hodoud Stadium | 22,000 | 8th in Second Division A |
| El Sekka El Hadid | Nasr City | El Sekka El Hadid Stadium | 25,000 | 7th in Second Division A |
| Sporting Alexandria^{↑} | Sporting | Alexandria Stadium | 19,676 | 1st in Second Division B Group F |
| Suez^{↑} | Suez | Egyptian Army Stadium | 45,000 | 1st in Second Division B Group C |
| Tanta | Tanta | Tanta Club Stadium | 9,000 | 6th in Second Division A |
| Telecom Egypt | Maadi | Al Salam Stadium | 30,000 | 13th in Second Division A |
| Tersana^{↑} | Mit Okba | Hassan El Shazly Stadium | 15,000 | 1st in Second Division B Group B |
| Wadi Degla | Zahraa El Maadi | Al Salam Stadium | 30,000 | 5th in Second Division A |

== League table ==
| Pos | Team | Pld | W | D | L | GF | GA | GD | Pts | Promotion or relegation |
|---|---|---|---|---|---|---|---|---|---|---|
| 1 | Al Mokawloon Al Arab (C, P) | 38 | 22 | 11 | 5 | 54 | 33 | +21 | 77 | Promotion to Premier League |
| 2 | Wadi Degla (P) | 38 | 21 | 13 | 4 | 44 | 14 | +30 | 76 | Promotion to Premier League |
| 3 | Kahraba Ismailia (P) | 38 | 21 | 11 | 6 | 67 | 35 | +32 | 74 (Note: Kahraba Ismailia finished ahead of Abou Qir Fertilizers on head-to-head points: Abou Qir Fertilizers 1–4 Kahraba Ismailia, Kahraba Ismailia 1–2 Abou Qir Fertilizers.) | Promotion to Premier League |
| 4 | Abou Qir Fertilizers | 38 | 21 | 11 | 6 | 55 | 24 | +31 | 74 | |
| 5 | El Sekka El Hadid | 38 | 14 | 15 | 9 | 41 | 31 | +10 | 57 | |
| 6 | El Qanah | 38 | 14 | 13 | 11 | 47 | 41 | +6 | 55 | |
| 7 | Aswan | 38 | 13 | 15 | 10 | 31 | 30 | +1 | 54 | |
| 8 | Proxy | 38 | 10 | 21 | 7 | 46 | 47 | −1 | 51 | |
| 9 | Asyut Petroleum | 38 | 11 | 16 | 11 | 39 | 42 | −3 | 49 (Note: Asyut Petroleum finished ahead of Telecom Egypt on head-to-head points: Asyut Petroleum 1–1 Telecom Egypt, Telecom Egypt 0–1 Asyut Petroleum.) | |
| 10 | Telecom Egypt | 38 | 12 | 13 | 13 | 36 | 42 | −6 | 49 | |
| 11 | Tersana | 38 | 13 | 9 | 16 | 37 | 43 | −6 | 48 | |
| 12 | Baladiyat El Mahalla | 38 | 9 | 18 | 11 | 25 | 27 | −2 | 45 | |
| 13 | El Dakhleya | 38 | 11 | 10 | 17 | 31 | 45 | −14 | 43 | |
| 14 | El Mansoura | 38 | 10 | 10 | 18 | 25 | 38 | −13 | 40 | |
| 15 | Tanta | 38 | 9 | 12 | 17 | 28 | 35 | −7 | 39 (Note: Tanta finished ahead of Raya Ghazl Kafr El Dawa on head-to-head goal difference: Raya Ghazl Kafr El Dawa 1–1 Tanta, Tanta 0–0 Raya Ghazl Kafr El Dawa.) | |
| 16 | Raya Ghazl Kafr El Dawar | 38 | 6 | 21 | 11 | 23 | 32 | −9 | 39 | |
| 17 | Dayrout | 38 | 8 | 14 | 16 | 36 | 45 | −9 | 38 (Note: Dayrout finished ahead of La Viena on head-to-head points: Dayrout 1–1 La Viena, La Viena 0–2 Dayrout.) | |
| 18 | La Viena (R) | 38 | 8 | 14 | 16 | 28 | 39 | −11 | 38 | Relegation to Second Division B |
| 19 | Suez (R) | 38 | 6 | 11 | 21 | 25 | 54 | −29 | 29 (Note: Suez finished ahead of Sporting Alexandria on head-to-head goal difference: Suez 0–0 Sporting Alexandria, Sporting Alexandria 1–1 Suez.) | Relegation to Second Division B |
| 20 | Sporting Alexandria (R) | 38 | 5 | 14 | 19 | 26 | 47 | −21 | 29 | Relegation to Second Division B |

Source: Soccerway
Rules for classification: 1) Points; 2) Head-to-head points; 3) Head-to-head goal difference; 4) Goal difference; 5) Goals scored; 6) Play-off tie.
(Note: Head-to-head records are used for final standings only)
(C) Champions; (P) Promoted; (R) Relegated

== Results ==
| Home \ Away | AQF | ASW | ASP | BMH | DKH | DAY | KIS | LAV | MAN | MOK | PRO | QAN | RAY | SKH | SPO | SUE | TAN | TEG | TER | WDG |
|---|---|---|---|---|---|---|---|---|---|---|---|---|---|---|---|---|---|---|---|---|
| Abou Qir Fertilizers | — | 2–0 | 0–0 | 1–0 | 1–0 | 2–1 | 1–4 | 0–0 | 3–0 | 3–0 | 2–0 | 1–2 | 1–0 | 0–0 | 0–0 | 3–0 | 0–1 | 2–0 | 2–0 | 1–2 |
| Aswan | 1–1 | — | 2–0 | 0–0 | 2–1 | 1–0 | 0–0 | 1–1 | 1–2 | 2–2 | 1–1 | 1–1 | 1–1 | 1–2 | 1–0 | 1–0 | 1–0 | 1–0 | 2–0 | 0–2 |
| Asyut Petroleum | 1–2 | 1–2 | — | 0–0 | 0–0 | 1–0 | 1–1 | 1–1 | 1–0 | 2–0 | 2–2 | 4–2 | 1–1 | 1–3 | 2–1 | 0–1 | 2–1 | 1–1 | 3–3 | 2–0 |
| Baladiyat El Mahalla | 1–1 | 1–0 | 1–1 | — | 1–2 | 2–1 | 2–2 | 0–0 | 2–0 | 0–1 | 1–1 | 1–0 | 0–1 | 0–0 | 0–0 | 1–2 | 2–0 | 0–0 | 0–1 | 0–0 |
| El Dakhleya | 1–2 | 0–0 | 1–2 | 0–1 | — | 1–4 | 0–2 | 1–0 | 0–3 | 0–0 | 3–4 | 0–0 | 1–0 | 1–0 | 1–0 | 0–1 | 0–1 | 2–1 | 1–2 | 1–2 |
| Dayrout | 1–1 | 1–0 | 0–2 | 0–0 | 0–1 | — | 2–2 | 1–1 | 0–1 | 1–1 | 2–3 | 0–0 | 1–1 | 1–1 | 0–1 | 1–3 | 1–0 | 1–2 | 1–1 | 0–2 |
| Kahraba Ismailia | 1–2 | 1–2 | 5–0 | 1–0 | 1–0 | 1–2 | — | 2–0 | 2–0 | 1–1 | 1–0 | 3–2 | 1–1 | 0–0 | 5–1 | 2–1 | 2–1 | 3–0 | 2–1 | 1–1 |
| La Viena | 0–1 | 1–2 | 0–0 | 2–1 | 2–3 | 0–2 | 0–2 | — | 1–0 | 2–3 | 1–3 | 0–2 | 2–0 | 1–1 | 0–0 | 0–0 | 1–1 | 1–2 | 1–3 | 0–1 |
| El Mansoura | 0–3 | 0–0 | 1–0 | 0–0 | 0–0 | 0–0 | 1–1 | 0–1 | — | 0–1 | 0–0 | 0–1 | 0–0 | 0–1 | 1–0 | 2–1 | 0–0 | 0–3 | 0–1 | 0–2 |
| Al Mokawloon Al Arab | 1–0 | 2–0 | 1–0 | 0–0 | 2–1 | 3–2 | 0–1 | 1–0 | 3–0 | — | 1–0 | 1–2 | 1–1 | 1–3 | 2–0 | 2–0 | 1–0 | 1–0 | 2–1 | 0–0 |
| Proxy | 0–4 | 1–1 | 2–2 | 1–1 | 1–1 | 0–0 | 3–2 | 2–1 | 1–2 | 0–2 | — | 1–1 | 2–1 | 2–1 | 2–2 | 2–1 | 1–0 | 0–0 | 0–0 | 0–0 |
| El Qanah | 1–1 | 0–0 | 1–0 | 1–0 | 1–1 | 1–0 | 1–2 | 0–0 | 2–2 | 3–4 | 1–0 | — | 0–0 | 1–1 | 4–3 | 1–0 | 0–1 | 2–1 | 1–2 | 1–0 |
| Raya Ghazl Kafr El Dawar | 0–0 | 1–1 | 0–0 | 0–1 | 1–1 | 1–1 | 0–2 | 0–0 | 0–2 | 1–1 | 1–1 | 3–0 | — | 0–2 | 1–0 | 3–2 | 1–1 | 1–1 | 1–0 | 1–0 |
| El Sekka El Hadid | 1–2 | 0–1 | 1–1 | 1–1 | 0–1 | 0–0 | 1–2 | 2–2 | 2–1 | 0–2 | 2–2 | 2–1 | 0–0 | — | 2–1 | 1–0 | 1–0 | 0–0 | 0–1 | 1–1 |
| Sporting Alexandria | 0–0 | 1–1 | 2–0 | 2–0 | 0–0 | 1–3 | 0–2 | 0–1 | 1–0 | 1–1 | 2–2 | 2–2 | 0–0 | 1–2 | — | 1–1 | 0–0 | 0–2 | 0–1 | 0–1 |
| Suez | 1–4 | 0–0 | 2–2 | 0–1 | 1–1 | 1–2 | 2–3 | 0–2 | 1–0 | 0–1 | 1–1 | 0–5 | 0–0 | 0–2 | 0–0 | — | 0–0 | 0–2 | 2–1 | 1–1 |
| Tanta | 0–1 | 1–0 | 0–2 | 0–1 | 4–1 | 0–0 | 1–1 | 0–1 | 1–3 | 3–5 | 1–1 | 0–0 | 0–0 | 1–2 | 3–0 | 2–0 | — | 1–1 | 1–0 | 0–1 |
| Telecom Egypt | 1–1 | 1–0 | 0–1 | 2–0 | 1–2 | 2–3 | 3–2 | 0–2 | 0–3 | 1–1 | 1–1 | 2–1 | 1–0 | 0–3 | 2–1 | 0–0 | 2–1 | — | 1–1 | 0–3 |
| Tersana | 0–3 | 0–1 | 0–0 | 3–3 | 0–1 | 3–0 | 2–1 | 1–0 | 2–1 | 2–2 | 1–2 | 0–2 | 2–0 | 0–0 | 1–2 | 1–0 | 0–1 | 0–0 | — | 0–1 |
| Wadi Degla | 3–1 | 2–0 | 2–0 | 0–0 | 2–0 | 2–1 | 0–0 | 0–0 | 0–0 | 0–1 | 1–1 | 2–1 | 2–0 | 1–0 | 1–0 | 3–0 | 0–0 | 0–0 | 3–0 | — |

Source: Soccerway
Legend: Blue = home team win; Yellow = draw; Red = away team win.

=== Positions by round ===
The following tables list the positions of teams after each week of matches. To preserve chronological order, any postponed matches are not included in the round they were originally scheduled for, but are added to the round in which they are played immediately afterwards. For example, if a match is scheduled for matchday 11 but postponed and played between matchdays 14 and 15, it is added to the standings for matchday 14.

| Team ╲ Round | 1 | 2 | 3 | 4 | 5 | 6 | 7 | 8 | 9 | 10 | 11 | 12 | 13 | 14 | 15 | 16 | 17 | 18 | 19 | 20 | 21 | 22 | 23 | 24 | 25 | 26 | 27 | 28 | 29 | 30 | 31 | 32 | 33 | 34 | 35 | 36 | 37 | 38 |
|---|---|---|---|---|---|---|---|---|---|---|---|---|---|---|---|---|---|---|---|---|---|---|---|---|---|---|---|---|---|---|---|---|---|---|---|---|---|---|
| Al Mokawloon Al Arab | 4 | 1 | 1 | 1 | 3 | 3 | 3 | 2 | 2 | 1 | 1 | 1 | 1 | 1 | 1 | 1 | 3 | 2 | 2 | 3 | 3 | 2 | 2 | 2 | 2 | 2 | 2 | 2 | 2 | 2 | 2 | 2 | 1 | 1 | 1 | 1 | 1 | 1 |
| Wadi Degla | 9 | 8 | 2 | 2 | 1 | 1 | 2 | 1 | 1 | 2 | 3 | 3 | 3 | 3 | 3 | 2 | 1 | 1 | 1 | 1 | 1 | 1 | 1 | 1 | 1 | 1 | 1 | 1 | 1 | 1 | 1 | 1 | 2 | 2 | 2 | 2 | 2 | 2 |
| Kahraba Ismailia | 13 | 14 | 10 | 7 | 7 | 6 | 4 | 3 | 5 | 5 | 9 | 8 | 5 | 4 | 5 | 4 | 5 | 5 | 5 | 5 | 5 | 5 | 5 | 6 | 5 | 4 | 6 | 5 | 4 | 4 | 4 | 4 | 4 | 4 | 4 | 4 | 3 | 3 |
| Abou Qir Fertilizers | 1 | 2 | 8 | 6 | 8 | 2 | 1 | 5 | 4 | 4 | 4 | 4 | 6 | 5 | 6 | 5 | 4 | 4 | 4 | 4 | 2 | 3 | 3 | 3 | 3 | 3 | 3 | 3 | 3 | 3 | 3 | 3 | 3 | 3 | 3 | 3 | 4 | 4 |
| El Sekka El Hadid | 15 | 12 | 13 | 14 | 10 | 10 | 13 | 14 | 14 | 15 | 17 | 17 | 15 | 16 | 12 | 12 | 11 | 10 | 10 | 8 | 8 | 6 | 6 | 5 | 7 | 7 | 7 | 7 | 7 | 6 | 6 | 6 | 6 | 6 | 5 | 5 | 5 | 5 |
| El Qanah | 12 | 9 | 4 | 5 | 6 | 9 | 6 | 8 | 6 | 6 | 7 | 9 | 10 | 10 | 10 | 8 | 10 | 9 | 9 | 7 | 7 | 8 | 9 | 8 | 8 | 8 | 9 | 8 | 8 | 8 | 9 | 8 | 7 | 7 | 7 | 7 | 7 | 6 |
| Aswan | 6 | 7 | 3 | 4 | 5 | 4 | 8 | 6 | 7 | 10 | 10 | 10 | 9 | 9 | 9 | 10 | 8 | 7 | 7 | 10 | 9 | 7 | 8 | 7 | 6 | 6 | 4 | 4 | 5 | 5 | 5 | 5 | 5 | 5 | 6 | 6 | 6 | 7 |
| Proxy | 10 | 5 | 7 | 3 | 4 | 8 | 11 | 9 | 9 | 7 | 5 | 6 | 8 | 8 | 7 | 7 | 7 | 8 | 8 | 9 | 11 | 11 | 10 | 10 | 10 | 11 | 10 | 9 | 10 | 10 | 8 | 10 | 10 | 10 | 8 | 8 | 8 | 8 |
| Asyut Petroleum | 18 | 15 | 16 | 16 | 13 | 12 | 7 | 10 | 8 | 9 | 8 | 5 | 7 | 7 | 8 | 9 | 9 | 12 | 12 | 12 | 10 | 10 | 11 | 11 | 11 | 10 | 11 | 11 | 12 | 12 | 11 | 11 | 12 | 11 | 11 | 11 | 10 | 9 |
| Telecom Egypt | 11 | 13 | 5 | 11 | 12 | 7 | 5 | 4 | 3 | 3 | 2 | 2 | 2 | 2 | 2 | 3 | 2 | 3 | 3 | 2 | 4 | 4 | 4 | 4 | 4 | 5 | 5 | 6 | 6 | 7 | 7 | 7 | 8 | 8 | 9 | 9 | 11 | 10 |
| Tersana | 8 | 6 | 12 | 8 | 2 | 5 | 9 | 7 | 10 | 8 | 6 | 7 | 4 | 6 | 4 | 6 | 6 | 6 | 6 | 6 | 6 | 9 | 7 | 9 | 9 | 9 | 8 | 10 | 9 | 11 | 12 | 12 | 11 | 12 | 12 | 12 | 9 | 11 |
| Baladiyat El Mahalla | 7 | 11 | 14 | 13 | 15 | 15 | 17 | 17 | 11 | 13 | 14 | 14 | 11 | 12 | 13 | 13 | 13 | 13 | 13 | 13 | 13 | 13 | 13 | 13 | 13 | 13 | 12 | 12 | 11 | 9 | 10 | 9 | 9 | 9 | 10 | 10 | 12 | 12 |
| El Dakhleya | 14 | 17 | 19 | 17 | 17 | 17 | 14 | 16 | 19 | 14 | 16 | 11 | 14 | 11 | 11 | 11 | 12 | 11 | 11 | 11 | 12 | 12 | 12 | 12 | 12 | 12 | 13 | 14 | 13 | 13 | 13 | 13 | 13 | 14 | 14 | 13 | 13 | 13 |
| El Mansoura | 20 | 19 | 20 | 20 | 20 | 20 | 20 | 20 | 20 | 20 | 20 | 20 | 19 | 19 | 19 | 18 | 18 | 17 | 17 | 17 | 18 | 17 | 18 | 19 | 17 | 17 | 14 | 13 | 15 | 15 | 15 | 16 | 14 | 13 | 13 | 14 | 14 | 14 |
| Tanta | 17 | 18 | 18 | 19 | 19 | 19 | 18 | 19 | 15 | 12 | 12 | 15 | 17 | 17 | 17 | 17 | 17 | 18 | 18 | 18 | 17 | 18 | 16 | 17 | 19 | 18 | 15 | 15 | 14 | 14 | 14 | 15 | 16 | 15 | 16 | 15 | 15 | 15 |
| Raya Ghazl Kafr El Dawar | 19 | 16 | 17 | 18 | 18 | 18 | 19 | 15 | 18 | 17 | 13 | 13 | 13 | 14 | 14 | 16 | 15 | 15 | 15 | 16 | 16 | 16 | 17 | 15 | 16 | 15 | 16 | 16 | 16 | 16 | 16 | 14 | 15 | 16 | 15 | 17 | 16 | 16 |
| Dayrout | 5 | 4 | 11 | 12 | 9 | 13 | 15 | 13 | 16 | 18 | 19 | 19 | 20 | 20 | 20 | 20 | 20 | 20 | 20 | 19 | 20 | 20 | 19 | 20 | 18 | 19 | 19 | 19 | 19 | 19 | 18 | 18 | 18 | 18 | 18 | 16 | 17 | 17 |
| La Viena | 2 | 3 | 6 | 10 | 11 | 11 | 16 | 18 | 17 | 19 | 15 | 16 | 16 | 13 | 16 | 15 | 14 | 14 | 14 | 14 | 14 | 14 | 14 | 14 | 14 | 14 | 17 | 17 | 17 | 17 | 17 | 17 | 17 | 17 | 17 | 18 | 18 | 18 |
| Suez | 16 | 20 | 15 | 15 | 16 | 16 | 12 | 12 | 12 | 11 | 11 | 12 | 12 | 15 | 15 | 14 | 16 | 16 | 16 | 15 | 15 | 15 | 15 | 16 | 15 | 16 | 18 | 18 | 18 | 18 | 19 | 19 | 19 | 19 | 19 | 19 | 19 | 19 |
| Sporting Alexandria | 3 | 10 | 9 | 9 | 14 | 14 | 10 | 11 | 13 | 16 | 18 | 18 | 18 | 18 | 18 | 19 | 19 | 19 | 19 | 20 | 19 | 19 | 20 | 18 | 20 | 20 | 20 | 20 | 20 | 20 | 20 | 20 | 20 | 20 | 20 | 20 | 20 | 20 |

| Promotion to Premier League |
| Relegation to Second Division B |

Source: Soccerway

== Number of teams by governorate ==
| Number of teams | Governorate | Team(s) |
|---|---|---|
| 5 | Cairo | El Dakhleya, Al Mokawloon Al Arab, El Sekka El Hadid, Telecom Egypt and Wadi Degla |
| 2 | Alexandria | Abou Qir Fertilizers and Sporting Alexandria |
| 2 | Asyut | Asyut Petroleum and Dayrout |
| 2 | Beheira | Proxy and Raya Ghazl Kafr El Dawar |
| 2 | Gharbia | Baladiyat El Mahalla and Tanta |
| 2 | Ismailia | Kahraba Ismailia and El Qanah |
| 1 | Aswan | Aswan |
| 1 | Beni Suef | La Viena |
| 1 | Dakahlia | El Mansoura |
| 1 | Giza | Tersana |
| 1 | Suez | Suez |
