= Egyptian Second Division A =

Second tier of Egyptian league football

- Organising body: Egyptian Football Association
- Founded: 1948; 78 years ago (officially); 2023; 3 years ago (as Egyptian Second Division A)
- First season: 2023–24
- Country: Egypt
- Number of clubs: 20 (since 2026-27)
- Level on pyramid: 2
- Promotion to: Egyptian Premier League
- Relegation to: Egyptian Second Division B
- Domestic cup: Egypt Cup
- International cup(s): CAF Confederation Cup (via Egypt Cup)
- Current champions: El Qanah (1st title) (2025–26)
- Most championships: Petrojet; Al Mokawloon Al Arab; El Qanah (1 title)
- Current: 2025–26 Season

The Egyptian Second Division A (Arabic: دوري القسم الثاني المصري "أ"), also known locally as the Professionals League (Arabic: دوري المحترفين), is the second tier of the Egyptian football league system since the 2023–24 season. It is administered by the Egyptian Football Association. It is below the top professional league in the country, the Egyptian Premier League, and above the newly created Egyptian Second Division B. It is the first professional second-tier league in Egypt.

== History ==
Plans to replace the old Egyptian Second Division with a professional league were first revealed by the Egyptian Football Association in 2018, with the purpose of increasing the quality of the league, improving domestic competitions, and also for marketing reasons. It was decided that the 2019–20 season will be the last edition with the old format, with the initial idea of lowering the number of teams participating in the league from 36 to 24 by relegating 15 teams to the Egyptian Third Division, and lowering the number of teams promoting from the lower league from twelve to just three. However, due to the COVID-19 pandemic in Egypt, and the financial difficulties faced by smaller clubs during that period, all clubs that finished in the relegation zones were reprieved from relegation, and the new league plans were halted.

After Gamal Allam was elected to the presidency of the EFA in January 2022, the idea to change the format of the second tier surfaced again, and it was decided that the football league system in Egypt will undergo major changes. This was confirmed in August the same year, and it was announced that the second division will be abolished, and two new leagues, known as the Second Division A and Second Division B, will be created as the new second and third-tier leagues, respectively. The reformation decision meant that the 2022–23 season will be the last edition of the old second division, which will see just 14 out of the 48 participating teams earning a spot in the first season of the Egyptian Second Division A.

The first ever team to secure participation in the inaugural season of the competition was Makadi, a team from Hurghada, that earned its spot on 21 March 2023, after topping the first group in the promotion play-offs phase of the 2022–23 Egyptian Third Division. All 20 participating teams in the inaugural season were confirmed by mid-July 2023.

The draw for the inaugural season of the competition was held on 22 August 2023, at the EFA headquarters.

=== Clubs' rejection and possible cancellation ===
Ahead of the conclusion of the 2022–23 football season in Egypt, numerous clubs publicly called on the EFA to cancel the new Second Division A league. They argued that the new leagues would not improve Egyptian football but would instead lead to a decline for clubs not owned by companies, citing difficult financial conditions and the high costs of travel in the new league. The EFA held multiple meetings with club representatives to discuss a mutually satisfying solution but ultimately failed to reach one. These clubs, including El Mansoura, Al Nasr, Olympic Club, Suez, and Tersana, all of which were relegated to the Second Division B, officially requested an Extraordinary General Assembly to be held with the affected clubs at the EFA headquarters to vote on halting the proposed leagues.

On 1 August 2023, over 50 clubs attended the Extraordinary General Assembly at the EFA headquarters to vote on whether to object to the creation of the new leagues, with all but one vote opposing it. One week later, on 8 August, the EFA announced in a statement that the assembly's convening was invalid due to unmet conditions and stated that an additional meeting would be held with Second Division A clubs to adjust the promotion and relegation system in the 2023–24 season, and to officially approve the new league format. Later that day, EFA board member Ehab El Komy announced the final league structure.

== League format ==
=== Inaugural season ===
The EFA introduced a special format for the 2023–24 season, announced by Amer Hussein, the president of the Egyptian Football Association's Competition Committee, during a live TV interview on 19 June 2023, and officially confirmed on 9 July 2023. The format meant that the league would consist of 20 teams in a single group, with the top two teams earning promotion to the Egyptian Premier League. The third-placed team would compete against the first-placed team from each group in the Egyptian Second Division B in a four-team playoff round to determine the third promoted team to the Premier League. Teams finishing in the bottom six would face relegation to the Second Division B.

The proposed promotion system gave Second Division B sides the opportunity to earn promotion directly to the Premier League without having to compete in the Second Division A. This decision drew significant criticism, as it was perceived as an attempt by the EFA to gain the trust of Second Division B teams, particularly those opposed to the implementation of the leagues, by providing them with a direct path to the Premier League. At the same time, the decision was viewed by some as a positive and compensatory measure, given that the football league system in Egypt was undergoing a transitional period, which some clubs and officials felt occurred too rapidly.

Following further meetings with Second Division A teams, a new format was announced on 8 August 2023, featuring minor changes. The season consists of two phases: In the first phase, teams face each other only once in a single-leg tie, after which the league splits into two groups. Phase two comprises a promotion group for teams finishing from first to tenth and a relegation group for teams finishing from 11th to 20th in the first phase. Similar to the initial format, the top two teams in the promotion group earn promotion to the Premier League, while the third-placed team competes against the three advancing teams from the Second Division B in a four-team playoff round to determine the third promoted team to the Premier League. Teams finishing in the bottom six of the relegation group face relegation to the Second Division B.

=== 2024–25 season ===
Starting from the 2024–25 season, a new format was introduced, which was the original format intended to be adopted from the first season. The league consists of 20 teams in one group, with all teams playing each other twice, home and away, for a total of thirty-eight matches. The first-placed team is crowned champions of the league, and earns promotions to the Premier League alongside the runners-up and third-placed team, while the bottom three teams face relegation to the Second Division B. However, the team finishing 18th, along with the best runner-up from Division B, competed in a promotion/relegation playoff.

The season played with 21 teams although Asmant Asyut FC and Asyut Petroleum SC finished the season with 23 and 15 games. Asmant Asyut FC was regulated to Egyptian Third Division while Asyut Petroleum SC maintained Second Division status.

Like other divisions in Egypt, it takes place annually, beginning in September/October, and ending in May/June of the following year. All teams are eligible to participate in the Egypt Cup, in case they pay the entrance fee.

=== 2025–26 season ===
The 2025 season began with 18 teams, with three promotion spots for the top three teams and two relegation spots for the last two teams.

== Clubs ==
=== Egyptian Second Division A current clubs ===
The following 18 clubs are competing in the Egyptian Second Division A as of the 2025–26 season.

- Abou Qir Fertilizers SC
- Asyut Petroleum
- Aswan FC
- Baladiyyat Al Mehalla
- Dayrout SC
- El Mansoura
- El Dakhleya SC
- El Sekka
- El Entag El Harby
- FC Masar
- La Viena FC
- Maleyat Kafr El Zayat
- Olympic El Qanah
- Proxy
- Raya Ghazl
- Tanta SC
- Telephonat Beni Suef SC
- Tersana

=== Inaugural Season of 2023–24 ===
The 20 participating clubs in the inaugural edition of the competition were all confirmed by 14 July 2023.

Members of and stadiums in the 2023–24 Egyptian Second Division A. (Note: Main stadiums for the 2023–24 season are listed only. Clubs are allowed to play selected matches at alternative venues; whether due to unavailability, security concerns, or other reasons. For example, Asyut Petroleum, a team from Asyut, may play some home games at Asyut University Stadium, instead of their regular home stadium, Asyut Petroleum Stadium.)

Locations of the 2023–24 Egyptian Second Division A teams
Locations of Egyptian Second Division A teams from Greater Cairo (Cairo and Giza)

Team	Location	Stadium	Capacity
Abou Qir Fertilizers	Abou Qir	Abou Qir Fertilizers Stadium	3,000
Aswan^{↓}	Aswan (Corniche Nile)	Aswan Stadium	11,000
Asyut Petroleum	Manfalut	Asyut Petroleum Stadium	6,000
Dikernis	Dikernis	Hamdino Abdel Galil Stadium	8,000
Ghazl El Mahalla^{↓}	El Mahalla El Kubra	Ghazl El Mahalla Stadium	14,564
Gomhoriat Shebin	Shibin El Kom	Gomhoriat Shebin Stadium	6,000
Haras El Hodoud	Mahatet El Raml	Haras El Hodoud Stadium	22,000
La Viena	Meidum	Al Assiouty Sport Resort	6,000
Makadi	Hurghada	Khaled Bichara Stadium	12,000
Misr Lel Makkasa	Faiyum (Ibshway)	Beni Suef Stadium	10,000
Al Nasr Lel Taa'den	Edfu	Al Nasr Lel Taa'den Stadium	4,000
Nogoom	6th of October	Al Solaimaneyah Club Stadium	3,000
Petrojet	Suez (Faisal)	Cairo Military Academy Stadium	28,500
Proxy	Abou El Matamir	Proxy Work Stadium	4,000
Olympic El Qanah	Ismailia (Sheikh Zayed)	Suez Canal Stadium	22,000
Raya Ghazl	Kafr El Dawar	Haras El Hodoud Stadium	22,000
El Sekka El Hadid	Nasr City	El Sekka El Hadid Stadium	25,000
Tanta	Tanta	Tanta Club Stadium	9,000
Telephonat Beni Suef	Maadi	Al Salam Stadium	30,000
Wadi Degla	Zahraa El Maadi	Al Salam Stadium	30,000
