= 2010–11 Egyptian Second Division =

Egyptian Second Division
- Season: 2010–11
- Promoted: Telephonat Bani Sweif (Group A); El Dakhleya FC (Group B); Ghazl El-Mehalla (Group C)
- Relegated: Group A Grand Hotel FC; Shabab El Waladeya FC; Al Wosta FC; Group B El Shams; El-Gendi FC; Zefta FC; Group C TBD; TBD; Al-Hamoul FC

The 2010–11 Egyptian Second Division was the 2010–11 season of the Egyptian Second Division competition. A total of 48 teams are divided into 3 groups based on geographical distribution. The top team of each group promotes to the highest Egyptian football level (Egyptian Premier League), The Season started on Monday 27 September 2010.

== Promoted and Relegated before 2010–11 Egyptian Second Division ==
=== Relegated from 2009–10 Egyptian Premier Division ===
- Ghazl El-Mehalla 14th
  Joined Group C
- Mansoura 15th
  Joined Group C
- Asyut Petroleum 16th
  Joined Group A

=== Promoted from 2009–10 Egyptian Third Division ===
Group A

- Maragha FC
- Nasr Mining FC
- Maghagha FC

Group B

- Zefta FC
- El-Sharqeya lel-Dokhan FC
- El-Gendi FC

Group C

- Al-Hamoul FC
- Bani Ebeid FC
- Matrouh FC

Tanta FC competed in Group C in the 2009–10 Second Division and then moved to Group B for the 2010–11 season. Consequently, four teams were promoted to the group, and two teams earned promotion in the 2010–11 season.

== Promoted and Relegated after 2010–11 Egyptian Second Division ==
=== Promoted to 2011–12 Egyptian Premier League ===
- Telephonat Bani Sweif won the Egyptian Second Division (Group A)
- El Dakhleya FC won the Egyptian Second Division (Group B)
- Ghazl El-Mehalla won the Egyptian Second Division (Group C)

=== Relegated to 2011–12 Egyptian Third Division ===
Group A
- Shabab El Waladeya FC
- Al Wosta FC

Group B
- El Shams
- El-Gendi FC
- Zefta FC

Group C
- Al-Hamoul FC

== League tables ==
=== Group A ===
Pos	Team	Pld	W	D	L	GF	GA	GD	Pts	Promotion or relegation
1	Telephonat Bani Sweif (P)	30	20	8	2	47	17	+30	68	Promotion to 2011–12 Egyptian Premier League
2	Aswan FC	30	20	7	3	54	20	+34	67	
3	Asyut Petroleum	30	16	10	4	54	29	+25	58	
4	Aluminium Nag Hammâdi	30	14	7	9	40	26	+14	49	
5	Fayoum SC	30	14	7	9	42	32	+10	49	
6	Sohag FC	30	13	9	8	48	43	+5	48	
7	Sokar El Hawamdia FC	30	13	8	9	34	27	+7	47	
8	El Minya FC	30	9	13	8	38	30	+8	40	
9	Maragha FC	31	9	7	15	27	43	−16	34	
10	Maghagha FC	29	7	11	11	25	35	−10	32	
11	Markaz Shabab Ebshouay	30	8	8	14	26	52	−26	32	
12	Abu Qirqas FC	30	8	7	15	41	48	−7	31	
13	Nasr Mining FC	30	6	12	12	29	37	−8	30	
14	Grand Hotel FC (R)	30	8	6	16	30	43	−13	30	Relegation to 2011–12 Egyptian Third Division
15	Shabab El Waladeya FC (R)	30	5	6	19	30	49	−19	21	Relegation to 2011–12 Egyptian Third Division
16	Al Wosta FC (R)	30	3	8	19	19	53	−34	17	Relegation to 2011–12 Egyptian Third Division

(P) Promoted; (R) Relegated

=== Group B ===
Pos	Team	Pld	W	D	L	GF	GA	GD	Pts	Promotion or relegation
1	El Dakhleya FC (P)	30	22	5	3	68	23	+45	71	Promotion to 2011–12 Egyptian Premier League
2	Itesalat	30	16	9	5	55	34	+21	57	
3	Tersana	29	15	11	3	30	15	+15	56	
4	Tanta SC	30	15	10	5	54	33	+21	55	
5	Al Nasr (Egypt)	30	12	11	7	66	45	+21	47	
6	Gasco	29	11	12	6	30	22	+8	45	
7	Montakhab El-Suez FC	29	11	9	9	40	36	+4	42	
8	Olympic El Qanal FC	29	11	7	11	38	38	0	40	
9	Al Mareekh FC	30	8	13	9	29	34	−5	37	
10	Al Rebat We Al Anwar	29	9	9	11	36	45	−9	36	
11	Suez Cement	30	8	10	12	29	37	−8	34	
12	El-Sharqeya lel-Dokhan FC	29	7	10	12	36	39	−3	31	
13	El Sharkia SC	30	7	10	13	32	45	−13	31	
14	El Shams (R)	30	5	9	16	18	35	−17	24	Relegation to 2011–12 Egyptian Third Division
15	El-Gendi FC (R)	30	3	9	18	24	58	−34	18	Relegation to 2011–12 Egyptian Third Division
16	Zefta FC (R)	30	3	4	23	19	65	−46	13	Relegation to 2011–12 Egyptian Third Division

(P) Promoted; (R) Relegated

=== Group C ===
Pos	Team	Pld	W	D	L	GF	GA	GD	Pts	Promotion or relegation
1	Ghazl El-Mehalla (P)	27	21	5	1	60	19	+41	68	Promotion to 2011–12 Egyptian Premier League
2	Mansoura	27	19	4	4	47	22	+25	61	
3	Koroum	28	16	6	6	55	25	+30	54	
4	Abu Qair Semad	28	15	7	6	36	22	+14	52	
5	Samanoud FC	28	11	8	9	34	28	+6	41	
6	Al-Olympi	26	11	7	8	27	22	+5	40	
7	Meiah Al-Beheira	27	10	8	9	29	26	+3	38	
8	Maleyeit Kafr El-Zayat	28	10	6	12	26	24	+2	36	
9	Baladeyet El-Mahalla	28	7	14	7	27	25	+2	35	
10	Ala'ab Damanhour	28	10	5	13	34	36	−2	35	
11	Al Rajaa SC	27	8	10	9	26	25	+1	34	
12	Al-Hammam	28	8	9	11	20	32	−12	33	
13	Nabarouh	28	6	8	14	26	45	−19	26	
14	Bani Ebeid FC	28	6	6	16	25	41	−16	24	Relegation to 2011–12 Egyptian Third Division
15	Matrouh FC	28	4	10	14	16	30	−14	22	Relegation to 2011–12 Egyptian Third Division
16	Al-Hamoul FC (R)	28	2	1	25	15	81	−66	7	Relegation to 2011–12 Egyptian Third Division

(P) Promoted; (R) Relegated
- Top 3 teams qualify for the 2011–12 Egyptian Premier League.
- Bottom 3 teams from each group are relegated to the Egyptian Third Division for the 2011–12 season.

== Results ==
=== Group A (Upper Egypt) ===
Home \ Away	ABU	WST	ALM	ASW	EBS	WAL	FYM	GHT	MGH	MAR	MIN	NMI	ASP	SOH	SKH	TBS
Abu Qirqas FC						0–1										
Al Wosta FC														1–5		
Aluminium Nag Hammâdi	2–2															
Aswan SC												4–0				
Markaz Shabab Ebshouay													0–0			
Al Walideya SC					0–1											
Fayoum FC															0–2	
Grand Hotel FC																1–3
Maghagha FC				0–0												
Maragha FC							0–1									
El Minya SC									0–1							
Nasr Mining FC			2–2													
Asyut Petroleum		1–0														
Sohag FC								0–0								
Sokar El Hawamdia FC											1–0					
Telephonat Beni Suef SC										3–0						

Updated to match(es) played on 8 October 2010. Source: http://www.filgoal.com/English/AllMatches.aspx?ChampId=252&Results=0
Legend: Blue = home team win; Yellow = draw; Red = away team win.

=== Group B (Cairo) ===
Home \ Away	MER	NAS	R&A	DKH	SHM	GAS	GND	MSZ	QAN	SHR	SDK	SZC	TNT	ITS	TER	ZFT
Al Mareekh FC											2–1					
Al Nasr Egypt													3–1			
Al-Rebat We Al-Anwar															0–0	
El Dakhleya SC			1–0													
El Shams Club																1–0
Gasco	1–1															
El-Gendi FC		3–3														
Montakhab El-Suez FC						2–1										
Olympic El Qanah FC							3–1									
Sharquia FC								0–0								
El-Sharqeya lel-Dokhan FC				3–4												
Suez Cement (Asmant el-Suweis)					1–0											
Tanta SC										2–0						
Itesalat									4–2							
Tersana												2–0				
Zefta FC														0–2		

Updated to match(es) played on 8 October 2010. Source: http://www.filgoal.com/English/AllMatches.aspx?ChampId=253&Results=0
Legend: Blue = home team win; Yellow = draw; Red = away team win.

=== Group C (Lower Egypt) ===
Home \ Away	AQS	HMM	HML	RAJ	BMH	BEB	DMN	GMH	KOR	MKZ	MNS	MAT	BWC	ITN	OLY	SAM
Abu Qair Semad											2–2					
Al-Hammam										0–1						
Al-Hamoul FC														0–1		
Al Rajaa FC															1–1	
Baladeyet El-Mahalla									1–1							
Bani Ebeid FC													1–1			
Ala'ab Damanhour			2–0													
Ghazl El-Mhalla		1–2														
Koroum	2–1															
Maleyeit Kafr El-Zayat					1–1											
El Mansoura SC						2–0										
Matrouh FC																0–1
Meiah Al-Beheira							1–1									
Nabarouh				1–0												
Olympi												2–0				
Samanoud FC								0–0								

Updated to match(es) played on 8 October 2010. Source: http://www.filgoal.com/English/AllMatches.aspx?ChampId=251&Results=0
Legend: Blue = home team win; Yellow = draw; Red = away team win.
