= 2022–23 Egyptian Second Division =

Egyptian Second Division
- Season: 2022–23
- Dates: 11 October 2022 – 9 July 2023
- Promoted: El Gouna (Group A); ZED (Group B); Baladiyat El Mahalla (Group C)
- Relegated: To Second Division B 28 teams (see league tables section); To Third Division; Al Madina Al Monawara (Group A); Media (Group B); Al Masry (El Salloum) (Group C)
- Matches: 723
- Goals: 1,561 (2.16 per match)

The 2022–23 Egyptian Second Division was the 43rd and last edition of the Egyptian Second Division, the top Egyptian semi-professional level for football clubs, since its establishment in 1977. The season started on 11 October 2022, and concluded on 9 July 2023. Fixtures for the 2022–23 season were announced on 2 October 2022.

In 2021, the Egyptian Football Association announced that the 2022–23 season would be the last edition of the competition, and that it would be replaced by two leagues called Second Division A (professional league, second tier) and Second Division B (semi-professional league, third tier) starting from the 2023–24 season.

El Gouna, ZED and Baladiyat El Mahalla won Group A, B and C, respectively and secured promotion to the 2023–24 Egyptian Premier League.

== Format ==
The league consists of 48 teams divided into 3 groups of 16 teams each, with each group covering different parts of Egypt:

- Group A for teams from Upper Egypt and eastern governorates.
- Group B for teams from Greater Cairo, and central and north-eastern governorates.
- Group C for teams from Alexandria and northern governorates.

The top team from each group will earn promotion to the next edition of the Egyptian Premier League. Teams finishing from 2nd to 5th place in each group will qualify to the newly created Egyptian Second Division A, and teams that finish from 7th to 15th place in all groups will be relegated to the new third-tier league Egyptian Second Division B, while the last-placed team from each group will be relegated to the Egyptian Third Division.

A special one-leg play-offs consisting of teams finishing 6th in each group will be held on neutral grounds, where the top two teams will qualify to the Second Division A and the last team will drop to the Second Division B.

== Teams ==
- Team name followed with ^{↓} indicates the team was relegated from the 2021–22 Egyptian Premier League.
- Team name followed with ^{↑} indicates the team was promoted from the 2021–22 Egyptian Third Division.
- Team name followed with ^{↔} indicates the team was transferred to a different group from the previous season.

Group A

- Al Aluminium
- Asyut Cement^{↑}
- Asyut Petroleum
- Dayrout
- Faiyum
- El Gouna^{↓}
- KIMA Aswan
- La Viena^{↑}
- Al Madina Al Monawara
- Mallawi
- El Minya
- Misr Lel Makkasa^{↓}
- MS Tamya
- Muslim Youths (Qena)^{↑}
- Al Nasr Lel Taa'den^{↑}
- Telephonat Beni Suef

Group B

- Eastern Company^{↓}
- El Entag El Harby
- Kahraba Ismailia^{↑}
- Media^{↔}
- Al Mostaqbal^{↑}
- Al Nasr
- Al Obour^{↑}
- Petrojet
- Porto Suez
- El Qanah
- El Sekka El Hadid
- Suez
- Telecom Egypt
- Tersana
- Wadi Degla
- ZED

Group C

- Abou Qir Fertilizers
- Baladiyat El Mahalla
- Dikernis
- Gomhoriat Shebin^{↑}
- Al Hammam
- Al Hilal (El Dabaa)^{↑}
- Ittihad Nabarouh^{↑}
- Kafr El Sheikh
- Al Magd
- El Mansoura
- Al Masry (El Salloum)
- Olympic Club
- Pioneers
- Proxy^{↑}
- Sporting Alexandria
- Tanta^{↑}

== League tables ==
=== Group A ===
Pos	Team	Pld	W	D	L	GF	GA	GD	Pts	Promotion, qualification or relegation
1	El Gouna (P)	30	21	6	3	54	23	+31	69	Promotion to Premier League
2	La Viena	30	21	5	4	51	19	+32	68	Qualification to Second Division A
3	Asyut Petroleum	30	18	5	7	40	18	+22	59	Qualification to Second Division A
4	Al Nasr Lel Taa'den	30	15	8	7	40	26	+14	53	Qualification to Second Division A
5	Misr Lel Makkasa	30	12	12	6	46	41	+5	48	Qualification to Second Division A
6	El Minya (R)	30	12	10	8	32	24	+8	46	Qualification for Second Division A/B play-offs
7	KIMA Aswan (R)	30	12	9	9	34	31	+3	45	Relegation to Second Division B
8	Dayrout (R)	30	10	10	10	40	33	+7	40 (Note: Tied on head-to-head points (3). Head-to-head goal difference: Dayrout +1, Al Aluminium –1.)	Relegation to Second Division B
9	Al Aluminium (R)	30	11	7	12	36	28	+8	40	Relegation to Second Division B
10	Asyut Cement (R)	30	10	8	12	32	38	−6	38	Relegation to Second Division B
11	Muslim Youths (Qena) (R)	30	7	9	14	31	40	−9	30	Relegation to Second Division B
12	Faiyum (R)	30	6	8	16	26	39	−13	26	Relegation to Second Division B
13	MS Tamya (R)	30	5	10	15	22	44	−22	25	Relegation to Second Division B
14	Mallawi (R)	30	5	8	17	24	53	−29	23 (Note: Head-to-head points: Mallawi 6, Telephonat Beni Suef 0.)	Relegation to Second Division B
15	Telephonat Beni Suef (R)	30	5	8	17	26	50	−24	23	Relegation to Second Division B
16	Al Madina Al Monawara (T)	30	5	7	18	30	57	−27	22	Relegation to Third Division

Source: Soccerway
Rules for classification: 1) Points; 2) Head-to-Head points; 3) Head-to-Head goal difference; 4) Head-to-Head goals scored; 5) Head-to-Head away goals scored; 6) Goal difference; 7) Goals scored; 8) Play-offs (only if needed to decide teams for promotion or teams for relegation).
(P) Promoted; (R) Relegated to Second Division B; (T) Relegated to Third Division.

=== Group B ===
Pos	Team	Pld	W	D	L	GF	GA	GD	Pts	Promotion, qualification or relegation
1	ZED (P)	30	18	11	1	44	19	+25	65	Promotion to Premier League
2	Wadi Degla	30	17	4	9	40	31	+9	55	Qualification to Second Division A
3	El Sekka El Hadid	30	15	9	6	42	27	+15	54	Qualification to Second Division A
4	El Qanah	30	16	5	9	33	25	+8	53	Qualification to Second Division A
5	Petrojet	30	14	10	6	41	23	+18	52	Qualification to Second Division A
6	Telecom Egypt (O)	30	14	7	9	43	31	+12	49 (Note: Tied on head-to-head points (2), on head-to-head goal difference (0), on head-to-head goals scored (0) and on head-to-head away goals scored (0). Overall goal difference: Telecom Egypt +12, Al Obour +1.)	Qualification for Second Division A/B play-offs
7	Al Obour (R)	30	14	7	9	25	24	+1	49	Relegation to Second Division B
8	Tersana (R)	30	12	12	6	31	21	+10	48	Relegation to Second Division B
9	Suez (R)	30	11	8	11	38	33	+5	41	Relegation to Second Division B
10	El Entag El Harby (R)	30	10	8	12	28	29	−1	38 (Note: Head-to-head points: El Entag El Harby 6, Porto Suez 0.)	Relegation to Second Division B
11	Porto Suez (R)	30	11	5	14	30	37	−7	38	Relegation to Second Division B
12	Al Mostaqbal (R)	30	7	8	15	32	40	−8	29	Relegation to Second Division B
13	Eastern Company (R)	30	7	7	16	29	43	−14	28	Relegation to Second Division B
14	Kahraba Ismailia (R)	30	6	9	15	33	42	−9	27	Relegation to Second Division B
15	Al Nasr (R)	30	6	6	18	24	47	−23	24	Relegation to Second Division B
16	Media (T)	30	2	4	24	13	54	−41	10	Relegation to Third Division

Source: Soccerway
Rules for classification: 1) Points; 2) Head-to-Head points; 3) Head-to-Head goal difference; 4) Head-to-Head goals scored; 5) Head-to-Head away goals scored; 6) Goal difference; 7) Goals scored; 8) Play-offs (only if needed to decide teams for promotion or teams for relegation).
(O) Avoided relegation to Second Division B through play-offs; (P) Promoted; (R) Relegated to Second Division B; (T) Relegated to Third Division.

=== Group C ===
Pos	Team	Pld	W	D	L	GF	GA	GD	Pts	Promotion, qualification or relegation
1	Baladiyat El Mahalla (P)	30	16	10	4	46	16	+30	58	Promotion to Premier League
2	Tanta	30	16	9	5	40	19	+21	57	Qualification to Second Division A
3	Dikernis	30	14	10	6	34	26	+8	52	Qualification to Second Division A
4	Abou Qir Fertilizers	30	14	9	7	41	34	+7	51 (Note: Head-to-head points: Abou Qir Fertilizers 4, Gomhoriat Shebin 1.)	Qualification to Second Division A
5	Gomhoriat Shebin	30	13	12	5	25	16	+9	51	Qualification to Second Division A
6	Proxy (O)	30	12	12	6	42	29	+13	48 (Note: Head-to-head points: Proxy 4, Kafr El Sheikh 1.)	Qualification for Second Division A/B play-offs
7	Kafr El Sheikh (R)	30	12	12	6	29	23	+6	48	Relegation to Second Division B
8	El Mansoura (R)	30	9	14	7	28	24	+4	41	Relegation to Second Division B
9	Olympic Club (R)	30	7	16	7	24	24	0	37	Relegation to Second Division B
10	Sporting Alexandria (R)	30	7	13	10	22	25	−3	34	Relegation to Second Division B
11	Al Hammam (R)	30	7	11	12	25	37	−12	32	Relegation to Second Division B
12	Al Magd (R)	30	6	13	11	24	36	−12	31	Relegation to Second Division B
13	Ittihad Nabarouh (R)	30	8	5	17	20	35	−15	29	Relegation to Second Division B
14	Al Hilal (El Dabaa) (R)	30	6	7	17	20	36	−16	25 (Note: Head-to-head points: Al Hilal (El Dabaa) 4, Pioneers 1.)	Relegation to Second Division B
15	Pioneers (R)	30	4	13	13	15	27	−12	25	Relegation to Second Division B
16	Al Masry (El Salloum) (T)	30	3	6	21	22	50	−28	15	Relegation to Third Division

Source: Soccerway
Rules for classification: 1) Points; 2) Head-to-Head points; 3) Head-to-Head goal difference; 4) Head-to-Head goals scored; 5) Head-to-Head away goals scored; 6) Goal difference; 7) Goals scored; 8) Play-offs (only if needed to decide teams for promotion or teams for relegation).
(O) Avoided relegation to Second Division B through play-offs; (P) Promoted; (R) Relegated to Second Division B; (T) Relegated to Third Division.

== Play-offs ==
The draw for the play-off round was held on 18 June 2023, 14:00 local time (UTC+3), at the Egyptian Football Association headquarters, to decide the order of the fixtures.

All matches were played at a neutral venue; specifically at Alexandria Stadium in Shatby, Alexandria.

=== Standings ===
Pos	Team	Pld	W	D	L	GF	GA	GD	Pts	Qualification or relegation
1	Proxy	2	1	1	0	3	2	+1	4	Qualification to Second Division A
2	Telecom Egypt	2	1	0	1	5	5	0	3	Qualification to Second Division A
3	El Minya (R)	2	0	1	1	6	7	−1	1	Relegation to Second Division B

Source: Soccerway
Rules for classification: 1) Points; 2) Head-to-Head points; 3) Goal difference; 4) Goals scored; 5) Play-offs (only if needed to decide teams for promotion or teams for relegation).
(R) Relegated

=== Matches ===
All times are CAST (UTC+3).

25 June 2023 (Note: The Proxy v El Minya match, originally scheduled to be played on 24 June 2023, was postponed for 24 hours due to conflicting with an Egypt Cup fixture scheduled to be played on the same day.)
18:00

Proxy	2–2	El Minya
Ahmed 15'; Hamada 52'	Report	Osman 43' (pen.); Atef 89'

Alexandria Stadium, Alexandria
Referee: Mahmoud Bassiouny

3 July 2023
18:00

Telecom Egypt	0–1	Proxy
	Report	Hamada 74'

Alexandria Stadium, Alexandria
Referee: Mohamed El Hanafy

9 July 2023
18:00

El Minya	4–5	Telecom Egypt
Mbachu 33'; Saki 77'; El Attar 88'; Abdel Rady 90+10'	Report	Shahin 8', 75'; Coulibaly 62', 90+4'; Ahmed 90+12'

Alexandria Stadium, Alexandria
Referee: Mohamed Youssef

== Number of teams by governorate ==
Number of teams	Governorate	Team(s)
6	Cairo	El Entag El Harby, Al Mostaqbal, Al Nasr, El Sekka El Hadid, Telecom Egypt and Wadi Degla
4	Alexandria	Abou Qir Fertilizers, Al Magd, Olympic Club and Sporting Alexandria
4	El Dakahlia	Dikernis, Ittihad Nabarouh, El Mansoura and Pioneers
4	Giza	Eastern Company, Media, Tersana and ZED
3	Asyut	Asyut Cement, Asyut Petroleum and Dayrout
3	Faiyum	Faiyum, Misr Lel Makkasa and MS Tamya
3	Matruh	Al Hammam, Al Hilal (El Dabaa) and Al Masry (El Salloum)
3	Suez	Petrojet, Porto Suez and Suez
2	Aswan	KIMA Aswan and Al Nasr Lel Taa'den
2	Beni Suef	La Viena and Telephonat Beni Suef
2	El Gharbia	Baladiyat El Mahalla and Tanta
2	Ismailia	Kahraba Ismailia and El Qanah
2	El Minya	Mallawi and El Minya
2	Qena	Al Aluminium and Muslim Youths (Qena)
1	El Beheira	Proxy
1	Kafr El Sheikh	Kafr El Sheikh
1	Luxor	Al Madina Al Monawara
1	El Monufia	Gomhoriat Shebin
1	El Qalyubia	Al Obour
1	Red Sea	El Gouna
