= György Gálhidi =

Hungarian footballer and manager (born 1954)

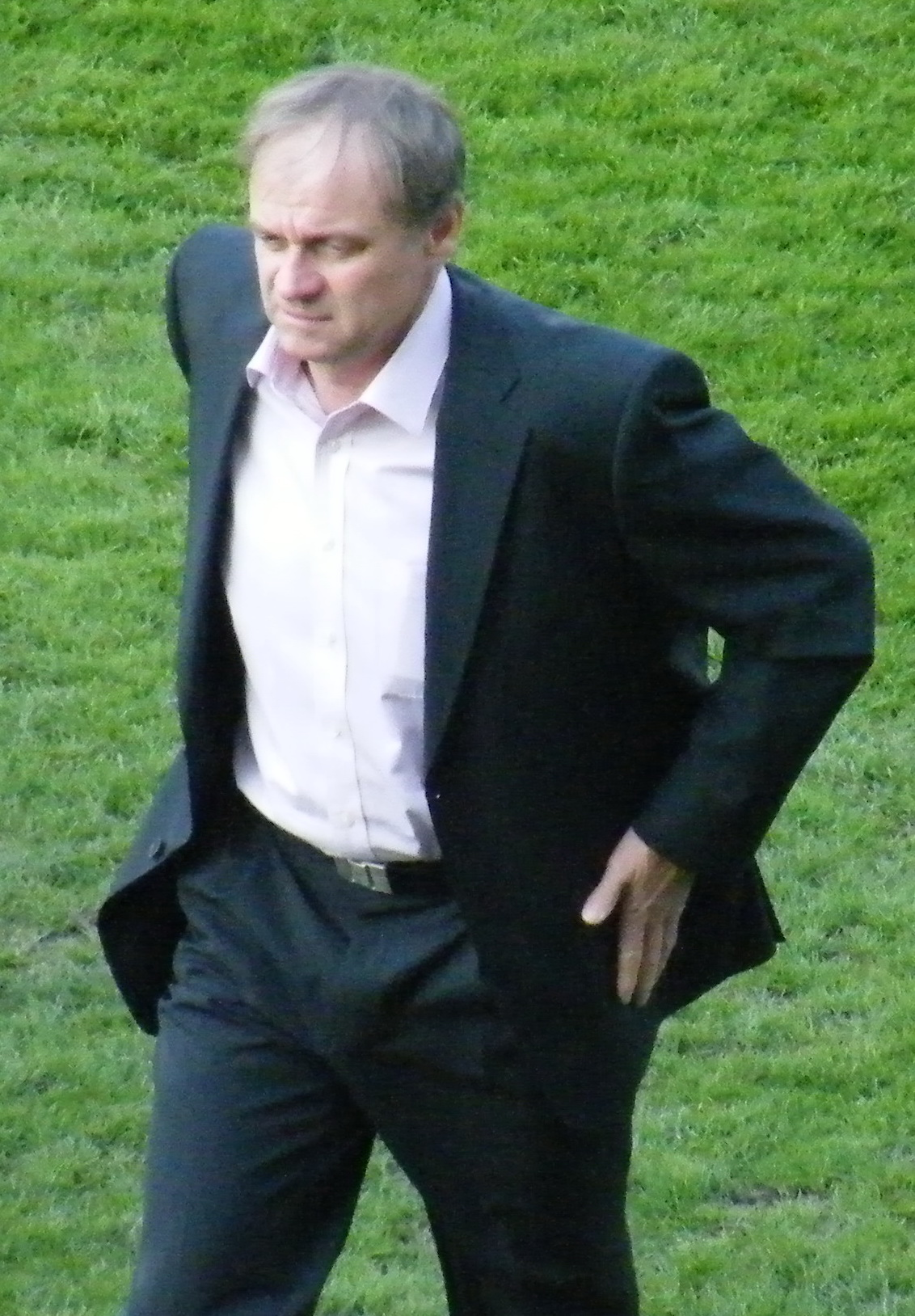
- Gálhidi in 2009

Personal information
- Full name: György Gálhidi
- Date of birth: 26 January 1954 (age 72)
- Place of birth: Budapest, Hungary
- Position: Full back

Youth career
- 1963–1972: Vasas Izzó

Senior career*
Years	Team	Apps	(Gls)
1972–1975	Vasas Izzó		
1975–1977	Kossuth KFSE		
1977–1980	Tatabányai BSC	18	(0)
1980–1987	Csepel	158	(3)
1987–1988	BVSC-Zugló		
1988–1990	Csepel	7	(0)
1990–1991	Dömsöd		
1991–1992	Szigetszentmiklósi		

International career
1983	Hungary	4	(0)

Managerial career
- 1989–1992: Csepel
- 1992–1993: Al Wahda
- 1993–1995: Al-Nasr
- 1995–1996: Soproni
- 1996–1998: Dunaújváros
- 1998: Tiszakécske
- 1998–1999: Budapest Honvéd
- 1999–2001: Al-Nasr
- 2002: Shenyang Ginde
- 2003: Dunaújváros
- 2003–2004: Budapest Honvéd
- 2004: Kecskeméti
- 2004–2005: Diósgyőri
- 2005–2006: Lombard-Pápa
- 2006–2007: Nyíregyháza Spartacus
- 2007–2008: Thể Công-Viettel
- 2009: Diósgyőri
- 2011: Halásztelek
- 2012–2013: Szeged 2011
- 2013–2014: Al Assiouty
- 2014–2015: Kazincbarcikai
- 2016–2017: Budapest Honvéd II
- 2017–2018: Budafoki
- 2018: Ózdi
- 2018–2019: Kazincbarcikai
- 2020–2021: Nyíregyháza Spartacus
- 2021–2022: Dunaharaszti MTK
- 2022–2023: La Viena
- 2023–2024: Nogoom
- * Club domestic league appearances and goals

György Gálhidi (born 26 January 1954) is a retired Hungarian footballer and manager. As a footballer, he would be primarily associated with playing for Csepel as he would be one of the club's primary players throughout the 1980s. He would be more well known for his managerial career, coaching various Hungarian clubs throughout various seasons of the Nemzeti Bajnokság II where he was commonly recognized as a manager who had the talent to promote clubs of the second division to the top leagues of their respective nations.

== Club career ==
Gálhidi would begin his footballing career by playing for Vasas Izzó's youth sector beginning in 1963. He would make his senior debut in 1972 and would spend the majority of his early career within the club playing under coach József Kovács who he would attribute as being a role model for his football career. His final season with the club would be in 1974–75 Nemzeti Bajnokság I as he would then play for Kossuth KFSE for the 1974–75 Nemzeti Bajnokság II after the club nearly experienced relegation in 1973–74 edition. Despite his career in the club being relatively brief, he would form part of the club's strong defense which would see the club make decent performances before leaving the club after the 1976–77 Nemzeti Bajnokság I. After playing for Tatabányai for a few seasons until the 1979–80 Nemzeti Bajnokság I, Gálhidi would spend the next seven years of his career playing for Csepel and alongside József Elekes and László Lazsányi, would be central players in increasing the club's performance by 82% according to statistics of the time due to the club winning by a previously unseen margin in the 1979–80 Nemzeti Bajnokság II. Throughout his remaining years as a footballer, he would play for BVSC-Zugló alongside his teammate and friend Pista Kisteleki for the 1987–88 Nemzeti Bajnokság I before returning to play for Csepel until the 1989–90 Nemzeti Bajnokság I. His final two seasons would be with Dömsöd and Szigetszentmiklósi until his retirement following the 1991–92 Nemzeti Bajnokság I.

== International career ==
Gálhidi would represent his home country of Hungary during the 1984 Summer Olympics qualifiers where he would play in four matches against Bulgaria, Greece and the Soviet Union.

== Managerial career ==
Throughout his later years as a player, he would also serve as a coach for Csepel's youth sector from 1989 to 1992. He would continue his work on youth teams by becoming a talent scout for the youth sectors of Al Wahda in the United Arab Emirates and Al-Nasr in Kuwait. He would have his first fully managerial position through Soproni for the 1995–1996 season. He would then coach Dunaújváros from 1996 to 1998. He'd then briefly coach Tiszakécske throughout the middle of 1998. He would spend the final years of the 20th century playing for Budapest Honvéd from the remainder of 1998 to the first half of 1999 to then coach Kuwaiti club Al-Nasr from 1999 to 2001.

Gálhidi then would go abroad to coach Shenyang Ginde for the 2002 Chinese Jia-A League. He would briefly return to coach Dunaújváros in 2003 but would abruptly leave before summer despite having some amount of success with his return. This was due to Gálhidi going on to coach Budapest Honvéd during the 2003–04 Nemzeti Bajnokság II where he would lead the time to be promoted back for the 2004–05 Nemzeti Bajnokság I following the club's only regulation to the second tier of Hungarian football which he attributes as being his first major success as a coach. For the remainder of the year, he would coach Kecskeméti. For the rest of the 2004–05 Nemzeti Bajnokság I, he took over the professional management of Diósgyőri and finished ninth with the team by the end of the season.

He would then coach Lombard-Pápa for the 2005–06 Nemzeti Bajnokság I where the club would be relegated for the 2006–07 Nemzeti Bajnokság II. During the following season in the Nemzeti Bajnokság II however, he would lead Nyíregyháza Spartacus to be promoted to the 2006–07 Nemzeti Bajnokság I. He would continue his success of promoting clubs back to their native top division by going abroad to manage Thể Công-Viettel where the club would win the 2007 Vietnam First Division and be promoted back to the 2008 V-League. He would then return to his native Hungary to manage Diósgyőri in a brief spell beginning in February 2009 but despite having the possibility to renew his contract for the 2009–10 Nemzeti Bajnokság I, it was ultimately decided to not renew it. He would then briefly return to manage Al Wahda's U-17 branch in 2009 and 2010 as well as briefly coach Halásztelek in 2011. During his coaching of Szeged 2011 for the 2012–13 Nemzeti Bajnokság II, the club would enjoy inicial success through Gálhidi's focus on discipline and integrity. Gálhidi would then go abroad to Egypt to manage Al Assiouty where he would successfully win the 2013–14 Egyptian Second Division and ensure the team be promoted to the Egyptian Premier League for the 2014–15 season. Following his first tenure with Kazincbarcikai for the 2014–15 Nemzeti Bajnokság III, he would receive an offer from Al Wahda to officially manage the club for the 2015–16 UAE Pro League but would ultimately be swapped out for Mexican manager Javier Aguirre.

He would then become manager of Budapest Honvéd FC II in the 2016–17 Nemzeti Bajnokság III where the club would achieve average results and managed Budafoki for the 2017–18 Nemzeti Bajnokság II where similar results would occur. Initially for 2018, he would coach Ózdi but would leave mid-season to return to coach Kazincbarcikai following the dismissal of the club's previous manager György Koleszár. Under his leadership, the previously relegated team finished 9th in the upper house of the 2018–19 Nemzeti Bajnokság II thanks to an unexpectedly balanced performance and a successful finish. However, in the autumn of 2019, this initial performance could not be carried forward, after the 18th match of the 2019–20 Nemzeti Bajnokság II, he was fired from the head of the team that was modest in 15th place at the time of his dismissal.

Gálhidi would temporarily be without work due to lockdown restrictions of the COVID-19 pandemic until he was contracted to return to coach Nyíregyháza Spartacus following the poor results of Roland Lengyel. Despite the team initially having a strong start at the beginning of the 2020–21 Nemzeti Bajnokság II, the club would lose momentum by the end, finishing 7th in the final results. For the 2021–22 Megyei Bajnokság I, he would coach Dunaharaszti MTK where the club would attempt to be promoted. He would later return to Egypt as manager of newly founded club La Viena for the 2022–23 Egyptian Second Division where the club would nearly experience promotion, missing only by one point. He would remain in Egypt to coach for Nogoom for the 2023–24 Egyptian Second Division A in hopes of the club being promoted to the 2024–25 Egyptian Premier League.

== Personal life ==
Throughout his primary school years, he was classmates with fellow footballer Péter Schumann.
