= Telephonat Beni Suef SC =

Association football club in Beni Suef, Egypt

- Full name: Telephonat Beni Suef Sporting Club
- Short name: TBS
- Founded: 1985; 41 years ago
- Ground: Beni Suef Stadium
- Capacity: 10,000
- Chairman: Ahmed Saad Temsah
- Manager: Abou El Einein Shehata
- League: Egyptian Second Division
- 2022–23: Second Division, 15th (Group A)
Home colours	Away colours	Third colours

Telephonat Beni Suef Sporting Club (Arabic: نادي تليفونات بني سويف الرياضي), sometimes referred to as TE Beni Suef, is an Egyptian sports club based in Beni Suef, Egypt. The club currently plays in the Egyptian Second Division B, the third-highest league in the Egyptian football league system. It was founded in 1985.

The club promoted to the Egyptian Premier League for the first time in its history in 2011, after winning the 2010–11 Egyptian Second Division.

== Current squad ==
As of 4 Nov 2025

Note: Flags indicate national team as defined under FIFA eligibility rules; some limited exceptions apply. Players may hold more than one non-FIFA nationality.

No.	Pos.	Nation	Player
1	GK	EGY	Mostafa Hassan Mohamed
-	DF	EGY	Ahmed Mahmoud Mohamed
-	DF	EGY	Ahmed Ragab
-	DF	EGY	Hazem Mahmoud
-	DF	EGY	Ayman Shawky
-	DF	EGY	Mahmoud Abdou
-	DF	EGY	Ahmed Reda
-	DF	EGY	Ahmed Mohsen
13	DF	EGY	Ahmed Aboul-Fetouh

No.	Pos.	Nation	Player
-	MF	EGY	Abdallah El Ballat
8	MF	EGY	Islam Ibrahim
27	MF	EGY	Islam Amer
-	MF	EGY	Mohamed Ragab
7	MF	EGY	Ibrahim Hassan
14	MF	EGY	Hamdi Seif
-	MF	NGA	Edward Thomas
-	FW	EGY	Gedo
10	FW	EGY	Abdallah El Nubi

== Managers ==
- (Egypt) Mohamed Salah (Feb 1, 2010 – Aug 17, 2011)
- (Egypt) Hamza El Gamal (Aug 21, 2011 – Jan 1, 2012)
- (Egypt) Ashraf Kasem (Jan 2, 2012 – May 13, 2012)
- (Egypt) Talaat Youssef (May 13, 2012 – July 23, 2013)
- (Egypt) Ahmed Shaaban (Dec 24, 2013 – Jan 29, 2014)
- (Egypt) Ehab Galal (Jan 29, 2014 – July 19, 2014)
- (Egypt) Ayman El Gamal (Oct 12, 2014 – April 26, 2015)
- (Egypt) Ahmed Shaaban (Jan 11, 2017 – May 31, 2017)
- (Egypt) Ayman El Gamal (June 5, 2018 – Nov 7, 2018)
- (Egypt) Eid Maraziq (Nov 15, 2020 – Nov 22, 2020)
- (Egypt) Mohamed Gamal (Dec 1, 2020 – Nov 8, 2021)
