= Abdoulaye Koffi =

Ivorian footballer (born 1991)

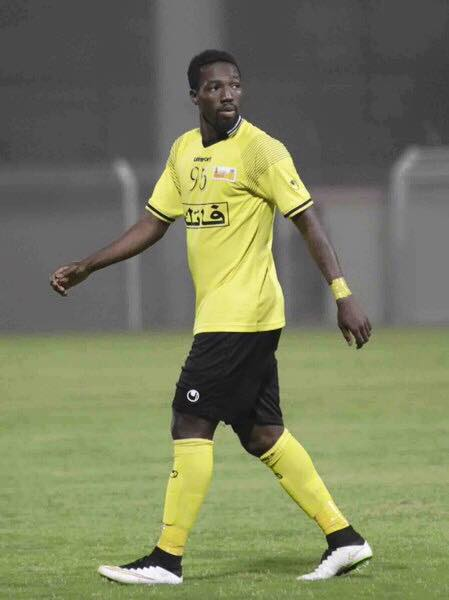
- Koffi with Al-Suwaiq in 2015

Personal information
- Date of birth: December 30, 1991 (age 34)
- Place of birth: Abidjan, Ivory Coast
- Height: 1.82 m (6 ft 0 in)
- Position: Forward

Team information
- Current team: Al-Hudood

Youth career
- 2000–2008: Ecole de Football Attécoubé

Senior career*
Years	Team	Apps	(Gls)
2008–2011	Grand Hotel	36	(22)
2011–2014	Eastern Company	31	(16)
2014	Saham	5	(2)
2015–2016	Al-Suwaiq	26	(18)
2016	→ Al-Khaleej (loan)	9	(1)
2017–2018	Shillong Lajong	14	(4)
2019	Abu Salem	?	(?)
2020	Salitas	5	(0)
2020–	Al-Hudood	0	(0)
- * Club domestic league appearances and goals

Abdoulaye Koffi (born 30 December 1991) is an Ivorian footballer who plays for Al-Hudood SC in the Iraqi Premier League.

== Personal life ==
Abdoulaye's elder brother, Mohamed Koffi is a former Burkinabé international footballer who plies his trade for Smouha SC in the Egyptian Premier League.

== Club career ==
=== Egypt ===
Abdoulaye began his professional career in Egypt in 2008 with Hurghada-based Grand Hotel FC. In his two-year spell at the Hurghada-based club, he scored 26 goals in 44 appearances. At the end of the 2010–11 season, he received the "Top Scorer" award of the 2010–11 Egyptian Second Division League for his outstanding performance in the season and for scoring 16 league goals in 24 matches. In 2011, he moved to another Egyptian Second Division club, Eastern Company. In his three-year spell at the club, he scored 17 goals in 35 appearances.

=== Saham ===
Saham SC

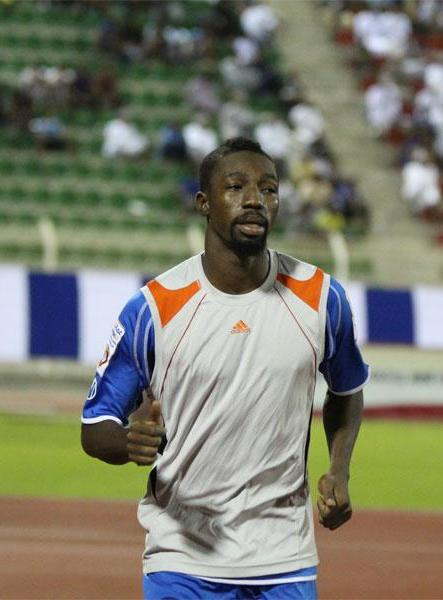
Celebration

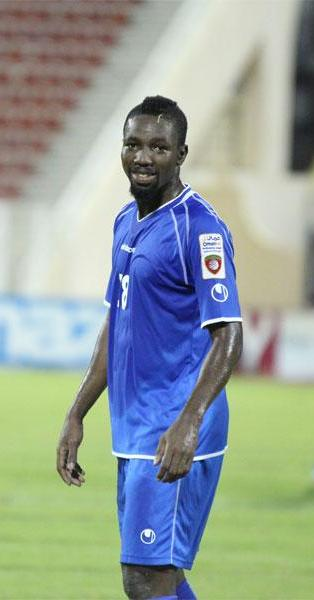
Against Sur SC

In August 2014, he moved to Oman and on 27 August 2014 he signed a one-year contract with Saham SC of Oman Professional League. He made his Oman Professional League debut on 19 November 2014 in a 1–0 loss against Bowsher Club and scored his first goal on 27 September 2014 in a 2–0 win over Al-Seeb Club. He also made his Sultan Qaboos Cup debut and scored his first goal on 1 December 2014 in a 3–0 win over Masirah SC in the Round of 32 of the competition. He also made his Oman Professional League Cup debut on 13 November 2014 in a 3–1 win over Al-Nahda Club and scored his first and only goal of the competition on 5 January 2014 in a 3–2 win over fierce rivals, Al-Khabourah SC. He scored 2 goals in 5 appearances in the 2014–15 Oman Professional League and 1 goal in 6 appearances in the 2014–15 Oman Professional League Cup for the Saham-based club.

=== Al-Suwaiq ===
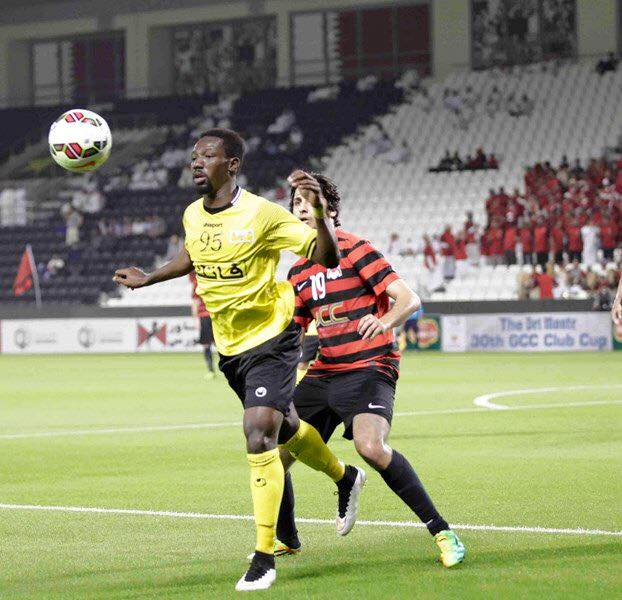
Abdoulaye Koffi - 2015 GCC Champions League

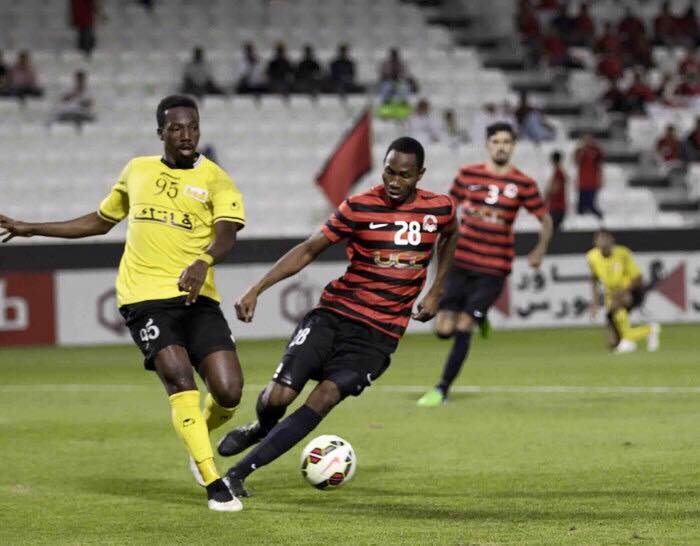
Abdoulaye Koffi - 2015 GCC Champions League

Al-Suwaiq Club

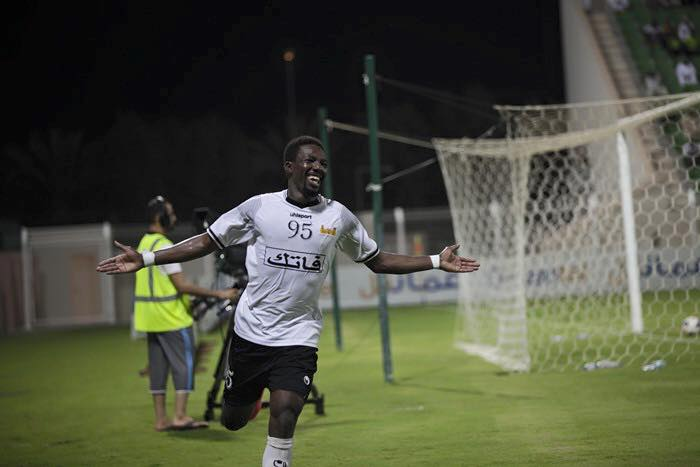
Celebration

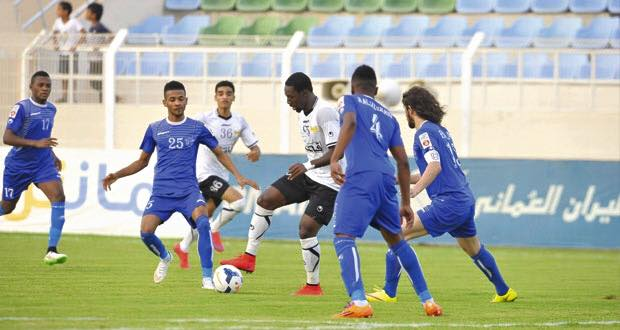
Against Sur SC

On January 6, 2015, he signed a six-month contract with another Oman Professional League club, Al-Suwaiq Club. He made his club debut and scored his first goal on 3 January 2014 in a 2–2 draw against Saudi Arabia's Al-Taawon FC in the 2015 GCC Champions League. He scored 12 goals in 15 appearances in the 2014–15 Oman Professional League for the Al-Suwaiq-based club which included a hat-trick on 15 April 2015 in a 4–1 win over Al-Seeb Club. He also scored 2 goals in 3 appearances in the 2015 GCC Champions League.

In August 2015, he signed a one-year contract extension with the Al-Suwaiq-based club. In the 2015-16 season, he made his first appearance and scored a brace on 5 September 2015 in a 3–1 win over Al-Shabab Club in the 2015-16 Oman Professional League Cup. He made his first appearance in the 2015-16 Oman Professional League on 13 September 2015 in a 2–1 win over Al-Nasr S.C.S.C. and scored his first goal in the competition on 18 October 2015 in a 3–1 win over Al-Shabab Club. Moreover, the other two goals in the game for the Al-Suwaiq-based club also came from the Ivorian thus making him the first hat-trick scorer of the 2015–16 Oman Professional League.

=== Al-Khaleej ===
After his eye catching performance in Oman Professional League, he caught the eye of various clubs in the region and as a result moved to Saudi Arabia on 22 January 2016 where he moved on loan to Saudi Professional League side, Al-Khaleej on loan from Omani outfit, Al-Suwaiq Club. He made his Saudi Professional League debut on 29 January 2016 in a 0–0 draw against Al-Fateh SC at the Prince Abdullah bin Jalawi Stadium and scored his first goal on 10 February 2016 in a 1–2 loss against Saudi giants, Al-Shabab FC.

=== Shillong Lajong ===
After various successful stints in the Middle East, the Ivorian finally made the decision to ply his trade in a new market and moved to India in September 2017. He signed a one-year contract with I-League side, Shillong Lajong FC.

=== Club career statistics ===
Club	Season	Division	League		Cup		Continental		Other (Note: Includes goals and appearances in the GCC Champions League)		Total	
Club	Season	Division	Apps	Goals	Apps	Goals	Apps	Goals	Apps	Goals	Apps	Goals
Grand Hotel	2009–10	Egyptian Second Division	12	6	5	3	0	0	0	0	17	9
Grand Hotel	2010–11	Egyptian Second Division	24	16	3	1	0	0	0	0	27	17
Grand Hotel	Total		36	22	8	4	0	0	0	0	44	26
Eastern Company	2012–13	Egyptian Second Division	15	9	1	0	0	0	0	0	16	9
Eastern Company	2013–14	Egyptian Second Division	16	7	3	1	0	0	0	0	19	8
Eastern Company	Total		31	16	4	1	0	0	0	0	35	17
Saham	2014–15	Oman Professional League	5	2	7	2	0	0	0	0	12	4
Saham	Total		5	2	7	2	0	0	0	0	12	4
Al-Suwaiq	2014–15	Oman Professional League	15	12	0	0	0	0	3	2	18	14
Al-Suwaiq	2015–16	Oman Professional League	11	6	3	3	0	0	0	0	14	9
Al-Suwaiq	Total		26	18	3	3	0	0	3	2	32	23
Al-Khaleej	2015–16	Saudi Professional League	9	1	1	0	0	0	0	0	10	1
Al-Khaleej	Total		9	1	1	0	0	0	0	0	10	1
Shillong Lajong	2017–18	I-League	14	4	2	2	0	0	0	0	16	6
Shillong Lajong	Total		14	4	2	2	0	0	0	0	16	6
Total			121	63	25	12	0	0	3	2	149	77

== Honours ==
Individual

- 2010–11 Egyptian Second Division: Top Scorer
- 2014–15 Oman Professional League: Second Top Scorer
