= 1990–91 Egyptian Premier League =

Egyptian Premier League
- Dates: 24 August 1990 – 31 July 1991
- Champions: Ismaily (2nd title)
- Relegated: El Minya; Gomhoriat Shebin; El Koroum; Port Fouad; Suez; Aswan
- African Cup of Champions Clubs: Ismaily (1st)
- African Cup Winners' Cup: Al Ahly (Cup winner)
- Matches: 307
- Goals: 497 (1.62 per match)
- Top goalscorer: Mohamed Ramadan (14 Goals)

18 teams participated in the 1990–91 Egyptian Premier League season as the previous season was cancelled so there was no relegation. The first team in the league was the champion, and qualified to the African Cup of Champions Clubs. Ismaily won the league for the 2nd time in the club's history.

== League table ==
Pos	Team	Pld	W	D	L	GF	GA	GD	Pts
1	Ismaily (C)	34	19	13	2	45	8	+37	51
2	Al Ahly	34	21	9	4	54	17	+37	51
3	Zamalek	34	21	8	5	50	12	+38	50
4	Ghazl El Mahalla	34	19	9	6	42	19	+23	47
5	Al Masry	34	14	12	8	30	22	+8	40
6	El Mansoura	34	13	14	7	31	28	+3	40
7	Al Mokawloon	34	14	11	9	31	20	+11	39
8	Olympic Club	34	11	13	10	34	27	+7	35
9	Tersana	34	11	13	10	25	24	+1	35
10	El Sekka El Hadid	34	10	11	13	22	34	−12	31
11	Al Ittihad	34	7	16	11	20	27	−7	30
12	Al Merreikh	34	8	14	12	25	35	−10	30
13	El Minya (R)	34	7	12	15	13	29	−16	26
14	Gomhoriat Shebin (R)	34	7	11	16	19	37	−18	25
15	El Koroum (R)	34	6	12	16	14	26	−12	24
16	Port Fouad (R)	34	5	11	18	18	46	−28	21
17	Suez (R)	34	7	6	21	10	39	−29	20
18	Aswan (R)	34	2	13	19	12	45	−33	17

Updated to match(es) played on unknown. Source:
(C) Champions; (R) Relegated

== Title playoff ==
31 July 1991

Al Ahly	0–2	Ismaily
	Report	Atef Abdel Aziz 75' (pen.); Bashir Abdel Samad 81'

Ghazl El Mahalla Stadium, El Mahalla

Al Ahly SC
Ismaily SC

== Top goalscorers ==
Rank	Player	Club	Goals
1	(Egypt) Mohamed Ramadan	Al Ahly	14
2	(Egypt) Mohamed Fikry El-Sagheer	Ismaily	13
3	(Egypt) Ahmed El-Kass	Olympic	12

== Team information ==
=== Clubs and locations ===
Location of teams in Egyptian Premier League 1990–91

Team	Home city
Ismaily	Ismailia
Al Ahly	Cairo
Zamalek	Cairo
Ghazl El Mahalla	El Mahalla
Al Masry	Port Said
El Mansoura	Mansoura
Al Mokawloon Al Arab	Cairo
Olympic	Alexandria
Tersana	Cairo
El Sekka El Hadid	Cairo
Al Ittihad	Alexandria
Al Merreikh	Port Said
El Minya	Minya
Gomhoriat Shebin	Shibin El Kom
El Koroum	Alexandria
Port Fouad	Port Said
Suez	Suez
Aswan	Aswan
