= La Viena FC =

- Full name: La Viena Football Club
- Founded: 2020
- Ground: Al Assiouty Sport Stadium
- Capacity: 6,000
- Owner: Mohamed Al-Assiouty
- League: Egyptian Second Division B
- 2024–25: Egyptian Second Division A, 18th of 20
- Website: lavienafc.com

La Viena FC is an Egyptian football club based in Beni Suef. The club currently plays in the Egyptian Second Division A. The club was founded "under the mindset" of the founders of the now dissolved club Al-Assiouty SC as per the official site of the club.

Founded in 2020, it is one of the newest football clubs in Egyptian Football.

== Club Foundation ==
On December 12, 2019, the club president of Al-Assiouty FC announced that he was going to relaunch the club after Al Assiouty Sport was rebranded into Pyramids Football Club. Now the former Al-Assiouty FC chairman Mahmoud Al Assiouty, announced that the club will be relaunched under the “Al-Assiouty 2020” project and will change its name to La Viena FC. The club was named after Vienna, the Austrian capital where chairman Al Assiouty spent 30 years. Inspired by his admiration for Spanish football, he chose the Spanish pronunciation "Viena" for the club's name.

== Early years ==
The club began its journey rising through its fourth and third division seasons back-to-back.

=== 2020–21 Season ===
On April 24 in the 2020–21 Egyptian Third Division, they officially made it to the Third Division. They were congratulated by former Assiyout Club Pyramids FC. The club chose to stay in their home ground Al-Assiyouty Sport stadium for their inaugural season and would stay in the same ground for their upcoming seasons.

=== 2021–22 Season ===
In the 2021–22 Egyptian Third Division Season, they topped group D beating out Fayoum Y.C. pre-maturely with a 16-point difference and 5 games remaining, automatically sealing them promotion, making them the second club in history next to Ceramica Cleopatra FC, to achieve promotion two consecutive seasons after competing in the third and fourth divisions.

=== 2022–23 Season ===
They would hire Hungarian György Gálhidi as their head coach when promotion was sealed. The 2022–23 Egyptian Second Division seemed to be competitive as El-Gouna FC and Petrol Asyut SC are in a close race for promotion with them.

=== Egypt Cup ===
Throughout this time, they managed to reach the Egypt Cup round of 32 on three different occasions, they lost the first time to Ismaily SC 2–1 in the 2020–21 season, then in the 2021–22 season they lost 1–0 to the club that was once owned by their current owners and a club that was formerly based in the Assiyout region, Pyramids FC. The third appearance was against ENPPI SC, in the 2022–23 season where they would lose 3–0.

== Managers ==
- György Gálhidi (2022–2023)
