= Aswan SC =

Association football club in Aswan, Egypt

Aswan
- Full name: Aswan Sporting Club نادي أسوان الرياضي
- Nicknames: Zahret El Ganoub (South Flower); Tamaseh El Neel" (Nile Crocodiles); El Azrq (The Blue); El Bashawat (Pashas)
- Founded: 1 January 1930; 96 years ago
- Ground: Aswan Stadium
- Capacity: 20,000
- President: el-Shafei Saleh
- Head coach: Mohamed Heshmat
- League: Egyptian Third Division
- 2025-26: Egyptian Second Division A 17th of 18 (Relegated)
Home colours	Away colours

Aswan Sporting Club (Arabic: نادي أسوان الرياضي), commonly referred to as Aswan, is an Egyptian football club based in Aswan, Egypt. Aswan was founded on 1 January 1930. It's the biggest team in town, and its opponent is the Al Nasr Lel Taa'den. The club played the 2025-26 season in Egyptian Second Division A but was relegated to the Egyptian Second Division B

== History ==
Aswan played a total of eleven seasons in the Egyptian Premier League in its history. The team first appeared in the Premier league in the 1990–91 season. The longest spell the team spent in the Premier league was for only three consecutive seasons (from 1996–97 to 1998–99).

== Recent seasons ==
Statistics in Egyptian Premier League.

Year	League	Level	Pld	W	D	L	GF	GA	GD	Pts	Position
1990–91	Egyptian Premier League	1	36	2	13	9	12	45	-33	17	18th of 18
1994–95	Egyptian Premier League	1	26	6	5	15	18	32	-14	23	13th of 14
1996–97	Egyptian Premier League	1	30	9	11	10	32	37	-5	38	9th of 16
1997–98	Egyptian Premier League	1	30	9	8	13	34	44	-10	35	10th of 16
1998–99	Egyptian Premier League	1	26	7	6	13	30	48	-18	27	13th of 14
2002–03	Egyptian Premier League	1	26	2	3	21	15	68	-53	9	14th of 14
2003–04	Egyptian Premier League	1	26	6	4	16	25	47	-22	22	12th of 14
2015–16	Egyptian Premier League	1	34	8	11	15	28	44	-16	25	15th of 18
2016–17	Egyptian Premier League	1	34	6	11	17	28	49	-21	29	16th of 18
2019–20	Egyptian Premier League	1	34	9	10	15	39	50	-11	37	14th of 18
2020–21	Egyptian Premier League	1	34	6	9	19	29	61	-22	31	18th of 18
2021–22	Egyptian Second Division	2	30	21	7	2	54	23	31	70	1st of 16
2022–23	Egyptian Premier League	1	34	8	9	17	31	45	-14	33	16th of 18
2023–24	Egyptian Second Division A	2	47	15	15	17	50	48	2	60	14th of 20
2024-25	Egyptian Second Division A	2	38	13	15	10	31	30	1	54	7th of 20
2025-26	Egyptian Second Division A	2	33	5	10	18	14	37	-23	25	17th of 18

== Honours ==
=== Domestic ===
Cup

- Egypt Cup
  - Runners-up: 1990–91

== Current squad ==
As of 10 October 2022.

No.	Pos.	Nation	Player
1	GK	EGY	Khaled Walid
2	DF	EGY	Ahmed Belia
3	DF	EGY	Ahmed Dahroug
4	DF	EGY	Ahmed Castelo
5	DF	EGY	Abdelrahman Abdelnabi
6	DF	EGY	Mahmoud Naim
7	FW	GAB	Malick Evouna
8	MF	EGY	Abdelaziz Mousa
9	FW	EGY	Mohamed Hamdy
10	FW	MAR	Ahmed Belhadji
11	DF	EGY	Mido Mostafa (on loan from National Bank of Egypt)
12	FW	EGY	Gedo
13	GK	EGY	Islam Soliman
14	MF	EGY	Emad Fathy
15	MF	EGY	Mostafa Abdelrasoul
16	GK	EGY	Amr Hossam (on loan from Eastern Company)

No.	Pos.	Nation	Player
17	DF	EGY	El Husseini Samir
18	FW	ANG	Dilson
19	DF	EGY	Islam Gamal
20	DF	EGY	Saber El Shimi
21	FW	EGY	Ahmed Khalid
22	MF	EGY	Ibrahim Ayesh
23	FW	EGY	Mahmoud Salah
24	FW	EGY	Ahmed Hamoudi
25	DF	EGY	Mohamed Atwa (on loan from El Gouna)
26	MF	NGR	Raphael Ayagwa
27	DF	EGY	Ali Fathy
30	DF	EGY	Islam Salah
32	FW	EGY	Gamal El Said
37	MF	EGY	Mostafa Anani
74	MF	EGY	Amr Reda
99	FW	NED	Bay Kamara

== Coaching staff ==
Coaching staff
(Egypt) Ayman El Ramady	Head coach
(Egypt) Samir Kamouna	Assistant coach
(Egypt) Hamada El Sayed	Assistant coach
(Egypt) Amar Moaz	Goalkeeping coach
Analysis department
(Egypt) Karim Fahmy	Head Analyst
