= Péter Schumann =

Hungarian footballer (1954–2024)

- Schumann playing for Újpesti Dózsa

Personal information
- Date of birth: 24 April 1954
- Place of birth: Budapest, Hungary
- Date of death: 5 April 2024 (aged 69)
- Place of death: Újpest, Budapest, Hungary
- Position: Midfielder

Youth career
- 1962–1966: Vasas Izzó
- 1966–1975: Újpesti Dózsa

Senior career*
Years	Team	Apps	(Gls)
1975–1980	Újpesti Dózsa	72	(8)
1975–1976	→ Pécs (loan)		
1980–1981	Váci Izzó		
1981–1982	Tatabányai Bányász	4	(0)
- * Club domestic league appearances and goals

Péter Schumann (24 April 1954 – 5 April 2024) was a Hungarian footballer. He played as a midfielder who was most recognized for his career within Újpesti Dózsa during the late 1970s, when the club won three honours within the Nemzeti Bajnokság I.

== Club career ==
Schumann began his football career by playing for Vasas Izzó at the age of eight. His uncle Béla Konkoly later scouted and convinced him to play for Újpesti Dózsa for the remainder of his youth career. He made his senior debut and first goal for the club on 22 February 1975 in a 4–2 defeat against Pécs. Schumann later played for Pécs on loan for the 1975–76 Nemzeti Bajnokság II before returning to play for Újpest until the 1979–80 Nemzeti Bajnokság I. During his time with Újpest, he oversaw the club winning three titles as well as being runners-up in two editions of the tournament. He then played for Váci Izzó for the 1980–81 Nemzeti Bajnokság II. The final club he played for was Tatabányai Bányász after he was scouted by the club's manager Károly Lakat. Schumann was repeatedly injured during his final season despite only playing in four matches which were his main citation in his retirement. He ended his career in a 4–0 victory over Budapest Honvéd.

== Personal life ==
Péter Schumann's father János Schumann was also a professional football player, playing for Dózsa Újpest but the family soon relocated to Budapest after World War II. Despite this though, Péter stated that his father's career was not the primary source of inspiration for him to pick up football as it came from playing the sport with other family members. He was also classmates with fellow footballer György Gálhidi at school.

Following his football career, fellow footballer Lali Buza convinced him to become a parking attendant where he remained employed at various locations for the next fifteen years. Around this time, Schumann was married and had a daughter, but he and his wife were later divorced. Former Újpest footballer Gyula Bánka later gave Schumann another job opportunity at his injection moulding shop in 2000. In 2003, while playing a game of football, he broke his left foot. Initially, he treated the wound but with persistent pain, he eventually checked himself at Újpesti Szakorvosi Rendelőintézet Budapest where he was later diagnosed with severe vasoconstriction and his foot was amputated due to no signs of life within the blood vessels. Schumann continued working with an artificial limb until his other leg also began experiencing similar symptoms. From 2014, Schumann was bound in a wheelchair and would later visit his grandson of one year old. Despite some newspapers describing Schumann as being suicidal over his life circumstances, he denied these claims, maintaining an optimistic outlook. He also maintained a friendship with Ede Dunai who wrote a biographical novel about Schumann titled Egy megcsonkított élet. In 2023, Schumann made a guest appearance at Újpest TV. Prior to his death on 5 April 2024, Schumann was set to meet his newly born granddaughter for the first time according to Dunai.
