= Bay Kamara =

Dutch-Senegalese footballer (born 2001)

Personal information
- Date of birth: 15 February 2001 (age 25)
- Place of birth: Senegal
- Position: Winger

Team information
- Current team: Aswan
- Number: 98

Senior career*
Years	Team	Apps	(Gls)
2022	Aswan	3	
- * Club domestic league appearances and goals

Bay Kamara (born 15 February 2001) is a Dutch-Senegalese player who plays for the Egyptian Premier League side Aswan as a winger.

== Biography ==
Bay Kamara was born on 15 February 2001, in Senegal. He started his career with Zeborgia team before joining Netherland International Youth Team. He has also previously played at AZ Alkmaar and FC Emmen. He joined the Egyptian Premier League side Aswan SC in 2022, he left for a short period to play on loan for Ismaily SC, but it never happened. He would return almost a year later to play for Aswan.
