= László Lazsányi =

Hungarian footballer (1954–2021)

- Lazsányi (in blue) in 1982

Personal information
- Date of birth: December 5, 1954
- Place of birth: Budapest, Hungary
- Date of death: December 3, 2021 (aged 66)
- Place of death: Óbuda-Békásmegyer, Budapest, Hungary
- Position: Midfielder

Youth career
- ???–1972: BVSC

Senior career*
Years	Team	Apps	(Gls)
1972–1978	BVSC		
1976–1978	→ Kossuth KFSE (loan)		
1978	Szegedi EOL AK		
1978–1980	Székesfehérvári MÁV		
1980–1984	Csepel		
1986–1987	Kerületi		
1988–1991	Gattendorf		

International career
1972–1973	Hungary U20		
- * Club domestic league appearances and goals

László Lazsányi (December 5, 1954 – December 3, 2021) was a Hungarian footballer and landlord. He played as a midfielder and his career was highlighted by playing for BVSC and Csepel throughout the 1970s and the 1980s.

== Club career ==
He started his football career in the youth team of BVSC, where he was a teammate of András Törőcsik. His first club as a senior player would be for Kossuth KFSE from 1972 to 1978, also playing for Kossuth KFSE via a loan. He would make his debut in the Nemzeti Bajnokság I beginning in 1978 as a midfielder for Szegedi EOL AK and would play until the 1980–81 Nemzeti Bajnokság I where he would then play for Csepel, in total playing in 152 matches and scoring 22 whilst in the top-flight of Hungarian football. In 1984, he received a multi-year ban for bribery. He would return in the 1986–87 Nemzeti Bajnokság II to play for Kerületi and spend the final years of his career playing beyond borders for Austrian club Gattendorf.

His daughter is Erika Lazsanyi, president of the rhythmic gymnastics section of MTK, whose husband is politician Tamás Deutsch.

== Murder ==
On the evening of December 3, 2021, László Lazsanyi, as the landlord of one of the condominium apartments within Nánási út in Budapest, visited his tenant István B. who was overdue on his rental payment. Lazsányi had the lock replaced, which was later broken by István with a hunting knife. As Lazsányi held the 57-year-old tenant accountable for this, István stabbed Lazsányi during the following altercation between the two. Paramedics were unable to revive him. The police arrested the man suspected of murder the same day with István later going on to express regret for the murder of Lazsányi as he would later receive a sentence of 9 years. Lazsányi died two days before his 67th birthday. His former Csepel teammates Béla Kincses and György Gálhidi offered their condolences to Lazsanyi's family following the news of his murder. His funeral was held on January 5, 2022, at the Szőnyi úti Stadion.
