= Mohamed Gamal =

Egyptian footballer

Personal information
- Full name: Mohamed Ezz-el-Din Gamal

Senior career*
Years	Team	Apps	(Gls)
- Olympic Club

International career
- Egypt
- * Club domestic league appearances and goals

Mohamed Gamal was an Egyptian footballer. He competed in the men's tournament at the 1928 Summer Olympics. Gamal is deceased.
