= Ahmed Shaaban =

Egyptian footballer (born 1978)

Personal information
- Full name: Ahmed Fahim Shaaban El-Hendawy
- Date of birth: October 10, 1978 (age 48)
- Place of birth: Mansoura, Egypt
- Height: 1.85 m (6 ft 1 in)
- Position: Defensive midfielder

Senior career*
Years	Team	Apps	(Gls)
2000–2013	Petrojet	89	(31)
2013–2014	El-Entag El-Harby		

International career^{‡}
2007–2009	Egypt	5	(0)
- * Club domestic league appearances and goals as of 11 October 2008 ‡ National team caps and goals as of 29 December 2009

Ahmed Shaaban, (Arabic: أحمد شعبان) (born 10 October 1978) is a retired Egyptian footballer. He played as a defensive midfielder for the Egyptian club Petrojet SC as well as Egypt national football team.

He was a member of Egypt's squad in Ghana 2008 African Cup of Nations. He also appeared in one qualifying match for the 2010 FIFA World Cup.
