= Grand Hotel FC =

Egyptian football club

- Full name: Grand Hotel Football Club Hurghada
- Nickname(s): GH Hurghada
- Ground: Hurghada, Egypt
- League: Egyptian Second Division
- 2009–10: 3rd (Group A)
Home colours

Grand Hotel FC is an Egyptian football club based in Hurghada, Egypt. The club colours are orange, blue and white.

2009/10 they play in the Egyptian Second Division Group A.

Old Grand Hotel Hurghada logo
