= Egyptian Army Stadium =

Football stadium in Suez, Egypt

- Interactive map of Egyptian Army Stadium
- Full name: Egyptian Army Stadium – Suez
- Former names: Mubarak International Stadium
- Location: Suez, Egypt
- Coordinates: 29.962350°N 32.568500°E
- Owner: Egyptian Football Association; Egyptian National Council for Youth
- Capacity: 45,000
- Surface: Grass

Construction
- Built: 2009
- Opened: 2009

Tenant
- Suez SC

Egyptian Army Stadium – Suez (Egyptian Arabic: ستاد الجيش المصري بالسويس) is an all-seated association football stadium in Suez, Egypt. The stadium was built in 2009 as one of the venues for the 2009 FIFA U-20 World Cup, which was hosted by Egypt.

The stadium was known as Mubarak International Stadium until 2011 and was changed to Egyptian Army Stadium as a result of the 2011 Egyptian revolution, which removed Hosni Mubarak from being the president of Egypt.
