= Mit Okba Stadium =

Egyptian sports arena

Coordinates: 30°3′44″N 31°12′10″E

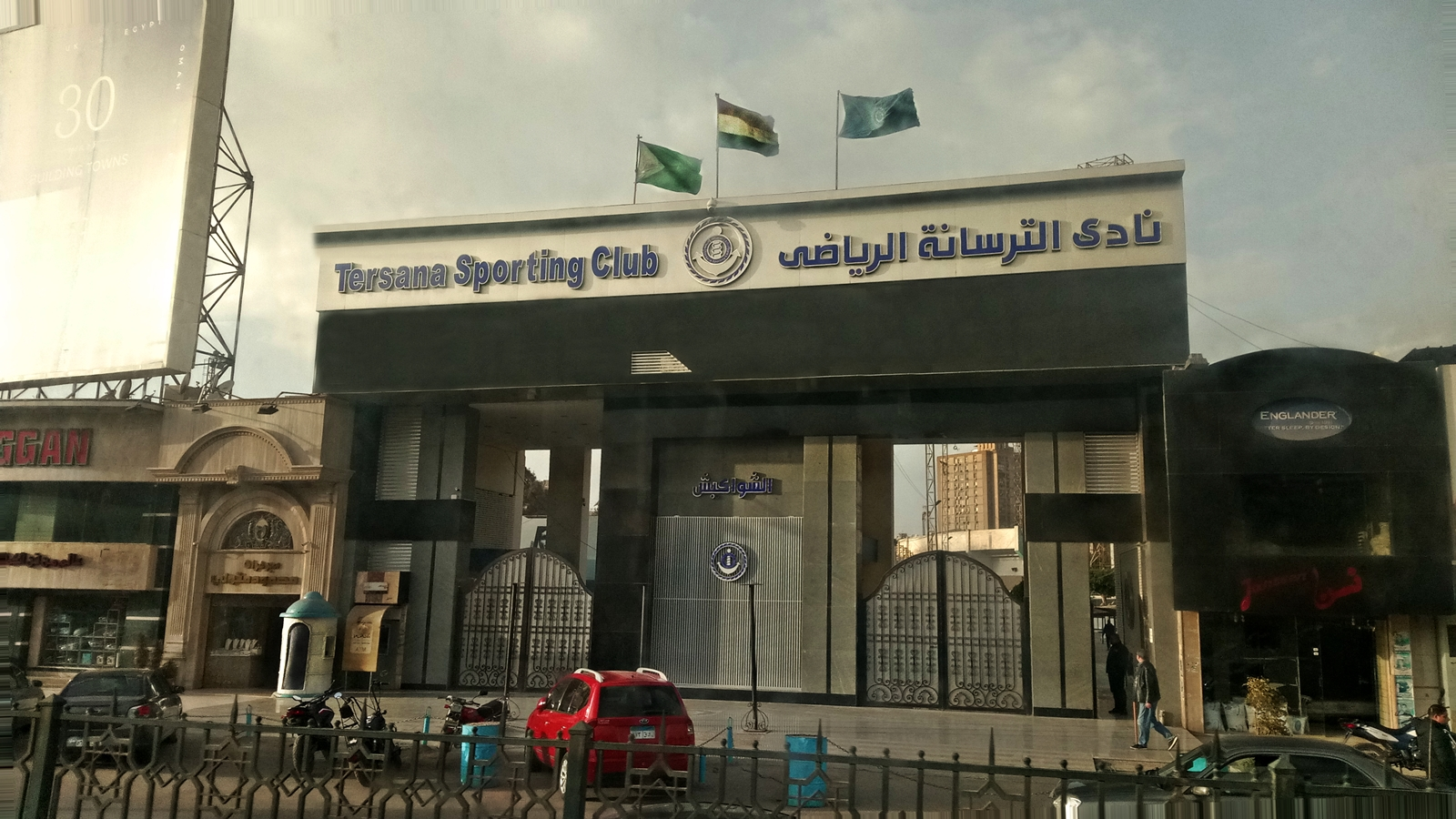
Mit Okba Stadium

Mit Okba Stadium is a multi-purpose stadium in Giza, Egypt. It is currently used mostly for football matches and hosts the home games of Tersana SC. The stadium holds 15,000 people.
