= Abu El Matamir =

- City
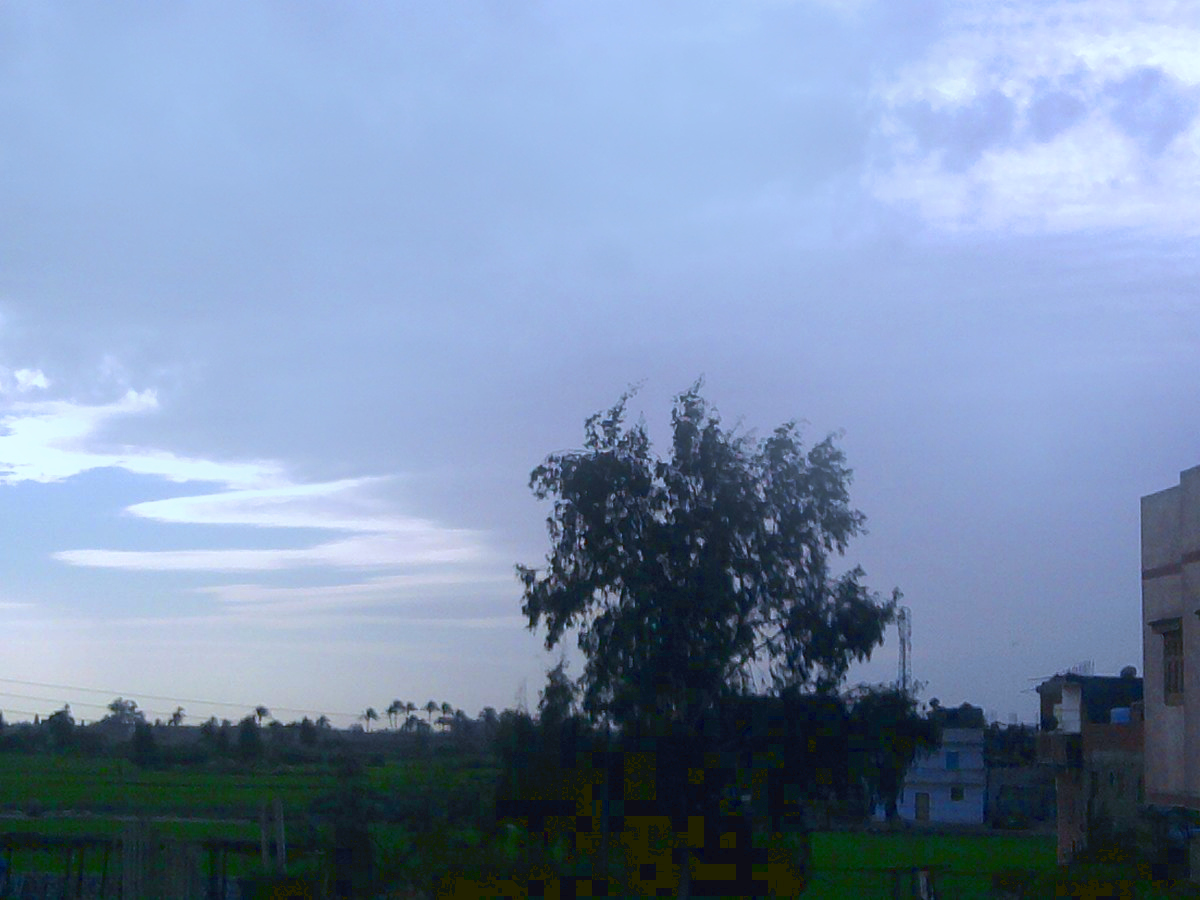
- Abu El Matamir view

- Location in Egypt
- Coordinates: 30.908411°N 30.148487°E
- Country: Egypt
- Governorate: Beheira Governorate

Area
  - Total: 10.9 km^{2} (4.2 sq mi)
- Elevation: 15 m (49 ft)

Population (2023)
  - Total: 69,338
  - Density: 6,360/km^{2} (16,500/sq mi)
- Time zone: UTC+2 (EET)
  - Summer (DST): UTC+3 (EEST)

Abu El Matamir (Egyptian Arabic: ابو المطامير pronounced [abol.mɑtˤɑˈmiːɾ]) is a city in Egypt. In 2023, it had a population of 69,338.

The city existed before the Islamic conquest of Egypt, and the Romans used it as a grain storage. The city acquired this name because wheat was stored in the past in Matamirs.

== Etymology ==
The Arabic name is from two words ابو "attributed"/"belonging"/father" and المطامير "the plummets".

== Climate ==
Köppen climate classification system classifies its climate as hot desert (BWh).

Climate data for Abu El Matamir
Month	Jan	Feb	Mar	Apr	May	Jun	Jul	Aug	Sep	Oct	Nov	Dec	Year
Mean daily maximum °C (°F)	18.2 (64.8)	18.9 (66.0)	21.5 (70.7)	25.4 (77.7)	28.8 (83.8)	31.2 (88.2)	31.6 (88.9)	32.1 (89.8)	30.4 (86.7)	28.8 (83.8)	24.6 (76.3)	20.2 (68.4)	26.0 (78.8)
Daily mean °C (°F)	13.1 (55.6)	13.7 (56.7)	15.8 (60.4)	19 (66)	22.6 (72.7)	25.4 (77.7)	26.3 (79.3)	26.6 (79.9)	25.2 (77.4)	23 (73)	19.2 (66.6)	15 (59)	20.4 (68.7)
Mean daily minimum °C (°F)	8.1 (46.6)	8.6 (47.5)	10.2 (50.4)	12.6 (54.7)	16.4 (61.5)	19.6 (67.3)	21 (70)	21.1 (70.0)	20 (68)	17.3 (63.1)	13.9 (57.0)	9.8 (49.6)	14.9 (58.8)
Average precipitation mm (inches)	25 (1.0)	20 (0.8)	6 (0.2)	5 (0.2)	2 (0.1)	0 (0)	0 (0)	0 (0)	0 (0)	5 (0.2)	16 (0.6)	26 (1.0)	105 (4.1)
Source: Climate-Data.org

== Notable people ==
- Mohamed Ibrahim (footballer, born 1992)
