= Asiut University Stadium =

Football stadium in Asyut, Egypt

Asyut University Stadium
- Interactive map of Asyut University Stadium
- Location: Asyut, Egypt
- Coordinates: 27°11′21″N 31°10′35″E
- Owner: Asyut Petroleum
- Operator: Asyut Petroleum
- Capacity: 16,000

Tenant
- Asyut Petroleum

Asyut University Stadium or استاد جامعة أسيوط is a football stadium in Asyut, Egypt. It is the home stadium of Asyut Petroleum of the Egyptian Premier League. The stadium holds 16,000 spectators. The 12,000-capacity Arba’een Sporting Stadium and the 16,000-capacity Asyut University Stadium are the largest sports venues by capacity in Asyut.
