= Suez SC =

Egyptian football club

- Full name: Suez Sporting Club نادي منتخب السويس للألعاب الرياضية
- Short name: SUE
- Founded: 1923; 103 years ago
- Ground: Egyptian Army Stadium
- Capacity: 45,000
- Chairman: Ahmed Abou Nazel
- Manager: Mostafa Abdo
- League: Egyptian Second Division B
- 2024–25: Egyptian Second Division A, 19th of 20 (Relegated)
Home colours	Away colours	Third colours

Suez Sporting Club (Arabic: نادي منتخب السويس للألعاب الرياضية), also known as Montakhab El Suez SC, is an Egyptian football club based in Suez, Egypt. The club currently plays in the Egyptian Second Division, the second-highest league in the Egyptian football league system.

In 2026, Suez SC merged its football operations with those of Petrojet SC to establish a new football club, Montakhab El Suez Petrojet SC. The merger followed the establishment of Montakhab El Suez Petrojet Football Company, in which Petrojet SC holds a 51% stake and Suez SC holds the remaining 49%. The merger is limited exclusively to football operations, with both clubs retaining their independence in all other sporting activities.

== History ==
After two clubs of Suez city were relegated to the Egyptian Second Division (the first was Ittihad Suez club in season 1965/1966 and the second was Suez El-Riyadi club in season 1966/1967) the two clubs joined to found Suez Montakhab Club in 1967.

- Ittihad Suez club played in the Egyptian Premier League for ten seasons starting from season 1955/1956.
- Suez El-Riyadi club played in the Egyptian Premier League for five seasons starting from season 1957/1958 and reached the final of the Egypt Cup in season 1964/1965 but lost the final against Tersana 4/1.
- Suez Montakhab played in the Egyptian Premier League for fifteen seasons starting from season 1974/1975 and reached the final of the Egypt Cup in season 1989/1990 but lost the final against Al-Mokawloon Al-Arab 2/1 and won fourth place in the League Cup in season 1999/2000 when Suez Montakhab beat Ma'aden 2/1. The EFA abolished this result because Suez Montakhab used an ineligible player and Ma'aden won the third place.

Since that time, Suez Montakhab has played in the Egyptian Second Division.

== Colours ==
Suez Montakhab's colours, white and blue, come from Suez's flag. Suez Montakhab's home kit is a white shirt with blue shorts. The team's away kit is a blue shirt with white shorts.

Home
Away

== Stadium ==
Suez Montakhab formerly played their home games at Suez Stadium.

=== Suez Stadium ===
- Capacity : 25,000
- Site : Zayteyat, Suez

In addition to Suez Montakhab, the Suez Stadium is the main stadium for Petrojet and Suez Cement as well.

== Performance in the Egyptian Premier League ==
=== Ittihad Suez's history in the Egyptian Premier League ===
Season	G	W	D	L	GF	GA	GD	Pts	Position	Group	
1955–56	20	7	4	9	22	29	−7	18	7th		
1956–57	26	6	9	11	29	44	−15	21	13th		
1957–58	14	6	2	6	17	19	−2	14	4th	Group A	
1958–59	18	7	5	6	21	20	1	19	5th		
1959–60	18	4	7	7	19	24	−5	15	7th		
1960–61	18	4	5	9	20	29	−9	13	10th		
1961–62	18	7	2	9	24	27	−3	16	6th		
1962–63	22	9	8	5	30	23	7	26	4th	Group A	
1963–64	22	10	6	6	32	22	10	26	7th	Group B	Relegation
1965–66	21	4	5	12	17	39	−22	13	11th		Relegation
Egyptian Premier League	151	51	40	60	180	203	−23	142			

=== Suez El-Riyadi's History in The Egyptian Premier League ===
Season	G	W	D	L	GF	GA	GD	Pts	Position	Group	
1957–58	14	4	5	5	22	22	0	13	6th	Group B	Relegation
1962–63	22	8	1	13	29	39	−10	17	7th	Group B	
1963–64	22	8	7	7	29	28	1	23	6th	Group A	
1964–65	22	7	2	13	16	27	−11	16	11th		Relegation
1966–67	22	4	5	13	11	28	−17	13	12th		Relegation
Egyptian Premier League	102	31	20	51	107	144	−37	82			

=== Suez Montakhab's History in the Egyptian Premier League ===
Season	G	W	D	L	GF	GA	GD	Pts	Position	Group	
1974–75	34	7	14	13	26	39	−13	28	13th		
1975–76	22	8	8	6	19	11	8	24	8th	Group A	
1976–77	28	8	13	7	25	25	0	29	6th		
1977–78	26	10	7	9	19	20	−1	27	8th		
1978–79	22	6	8	8	16	20	−4	20	9th		
1979–80	30	5	12	13	13	28	−15	22	14th		Relegation
1985–86	22	3	12	7	7	16	−9	18	10th		
1986–87	22	2	11	9	12	19	−7	17	11th		Relegation
1988–89	22	5	9	8	11	21	−10	24	9th		
1990–91	34	7	6	21	10	39	−29	20	17th		Relegation
1994–95	26	7	11	8	14	23	−9	32	6th		
1995–96	30	9	12	9	24	24	0	39	9th		
1996–97	30	7	12	11	24	32	−8	33	12th		
1997–98	30	8	7	15	21	34	−13	31	14th		Relegation
1999–00	26	6	9	11	14	35	−21	27	12th		Relegation
Egyptian Premier League	404	98	151	155	255	386	−131	391			

== Best achievements ==
- Egyptian Premier League
  - Ittihad Suez : 4th : 1957–58, 1962–63
  - Suez El-Riyadi : 6th : 1963–64
  - Suez Montakhab : 6th : 1976–77, 1994–95
- Egyptian Cup
  - Suez El-Riyadi : Final : 1964–65
  - Suez Montakhab : Final : 1989–90
- Egyptian League Cup
  - Suez Montakhab : 4th : 1999–00

== Board of directors ==
Position	Staff
President	Ahmed Abou Nazel
Member	Reda Abdel Samad
Member	Ahmed Ghareb
Member	Mahmoud Etman
Member	Osama Al Moshi
Member	Kamel Sa'fan
Member	Saed Khalefa

== Players and coaching staff ==
=== Coaching staff ===
Position	Name
Manager	(Egypt) Ramadan Al-Sayed
Football Director	(Egypt) Mohamed Seyam
General Coach	(Egypt) Khaled Metwali
Coach	(Egypt) Emam Mohamaden
Goalkeeper Coach	vacant

=== Current First Team squad ===
Note: Flags indicate national team as defined under FIFA eligibility rules; some limited exceptions apply. Players may hold more than one non-FIFA nationality.

No.	Pos.	Nation	Player
—	GK	EGY	Ali Abdel Rahem
—	GK	EGY	Mohamed Ibrahim
—	GK	EGY	Abdel Latif Mostafa
—	DF	EGY	Ibrahim Abdel Fattah
—	DF	EGY	Mohamed Abdel Ghani "Eno"
—	DF	EGY	Khaled Abdel Naser
—	DF	EGY	Mohamed Abdel Wahed
—	DF	EGY	Sameh Shosha
—	DF	EGY	Yassin Ahmed
—	DF	EGY	Ayman Mostafa "Kotta"
—	DF	EGY	Farouq Wahba
—	DF	EGY	Amr Ramadan
—	MF	EGY	Kamal Tayser
—	MF	EGY	Mohamed Zekri
—	MF	EGY	Essam Hassan
—	MF	EGY	Nader Al Sayed
—	MF	EGY	Waled Bakr

No.	Pos.	Nation	Player
—	MF	EGY	Mohamed Ragab
—	MF	EGY	Mohamed Yehya
—	MF	EGY	Ahmed Samir
—	MF	EGY	Mohamed Abdel Gabbar
—	MF	EGY	Ahmed Fawzi
—	MF	EGY	Mohamed Fadi
—	FW	EGY	Alaa Abdel Tawab
—	FW	EGY	Mohamed Abdul allah
—	FW	EGY	Ahmed Mansour
—	FW	EGY	Adel Emam
—	FW	EGY	Ahmed Abdul allah
—	FW	EGY	Abdul Gallel Hosni "Kamatsho"
—	FW	EGY	Waled Mosa
—	FW	EGY	Mohamed Ali Al Soghayar
—	FW	EGY	Soma Mostafa
—	FW	EGY	Hani Gamal
