= Abou Qir Fertilizers SC =

Association football club in Alexandria, Egypt

Abu Qir Semad
- Full name: Abu Qir Semads Football Club
- Founded: 1987; 39 years ago
- Ground: Alexandria Stadium
- Capacity: 19,676
- Manager: Magdy Abdelaaty
- League: Egyptian Premier League
- 2025–26: Egyptian Second Division A, 3rd of 18 (promoted)

Abu Qir Fertilizers Sports Club (Arabic: نادي أبو قير للأسمدة الرياضي), is a football club established in 1987 by Abu Qir Fertilizers and Chemicals Industries Company in Alexandria, Egypt.

The club currently plays in the Egyptian Premier League, the highest league in the country.

== History ==
The club mostly competed in the Egyptian Second Division. Later on, they participated in the inaugural 2023–24 Egyptian Second Division A. On 14 May 2026, the club achieved a 4–0 victory over Raya Ghazl Kafr El Dawar on the final matchday of the 2025–26 season, securing a third-place finish and first-ever promotion to the Egyptian Premier League.

== Current squad ==
Note: Flags indicate national team as defined under FIFA eligibility rules; some limited exceptions apply. Players may hold more than one non-FIFA nationality.

No.	Pos.	Nation	Player
1	GK	EGY	Mohamed El-Saify
2	DF	EGY	Mohamed Kamal
3	DF	EGY	Mohamed Ali
4	DF	EGY	Rida Mohsen
5	DF	EGY	Tamer Samir
6	MF	EGY	Tamer Abd El-Gwad
7	MF	EGY	Mohamed Mahran

No.	Pos.	Nation	Player
8	MF	EGY	Islam Ali
9	MF	EGY	Amro El-Shikh
11	FW	EGY	Mohamad Ramadan
12	GK	EGY	Mohamad Atia
13	DF	EGY	Hassen Mohamad
14	MF	EGY	Mohamad Said
17	MF	EGY	Mohamed Mostafa

== Managers ==
- (Egypt) Salah El-Nahy (July 1, 2007 – May 14, 2010)
- (Egypt) Ahmed El-Kass (May 28, 2010– )
