= Asyut Petroleum SC =

Association football club in Asyut, Egypt

Asyut Petroleum
- Full name: Asyut Petroleum Sports Club
- Founded: 1990; 36 years ago
- Ground: Asiut University Stadium
- Capacity: 16,000
- League: Egyptian Second Division A
- 2025–26: Egyptian Second Division A 2nd of 18 (promoted)
Home colours	Away colours

Asyut Petroleum Sports Club (Arabic: نادي بترول أسيوط الرياضي), commonly referred to as Petrol Asyout, is an Egyptian football club based in Asyut, Egypt, currently competing in the Egyptian Second Division A. The team won promotion in the 2025-26 season and will play in the Egyptian Premier League for the 2026-27 season.

== Honours ==
- Egypt Cup runner-up: 2008–09

Promoted to Egyptian premier league

== Current squad ==
Note: Flags indicate national team as defined under FIFA eligibility rules; some limited exceptions apply. Players may hold more than one non-FIFA nationality.

No.	Pos.	Nation	Player
1	GK	EGY	Amgad Youssef
2	DF	EGY	Moamen Eid
4	DF	EGY	Ali Mahran
5	DF	EGY	Mahmoud Alaa
6	DF	EGY	Ahmed Magdy
7	FW	EGY	Ahmed Younes
8	MF	EGY	Fathy Gamal
9	FW	EGY	Mohamed Eid
11	FW	EGY	Mostafa Sadafa
12	DF	EGY	Ziad Tarek
13	FW	EGY	Ismail Ashraf
14	FW	EGY	Ahmed Arabi
15	FW	EGY	Ahmed Khaled
16	GK	EGY	Karim Emad
17	MF	EGY	Ahmed Hamzawi
18	MF	EGY	Abdo Keshkesh

No.	Pos.	Nation	Player
19	MF	EGY	Mohamed Hesha
20	DF	EGY	Ahmed Shokry
21	MF	EGY	Bakr Fawzi
23	GK	EGY	Ahmed Gamal
24	DF	EGY	Mahmoud Okal
25	GK	EGY	Abdelaziz Ahmed
26	MF	EGY	Abdelrahman El Khamisi
29	DF	EGY	Abdelrahman Morgan
30	DF	EGY	Abdelrahman Medhat
31	MF	NGR	Alabi Salam
34	DF	EGY	Khaled Abdelaal
35	FW	CMR	Che Corines Bodne
38	FW	NGR	Joshua Egaji
40	MF	EGY	Youssef Ahmed Hassan
