= Egyptian Second Division B =

Third tier of Egyptian league football

- Organising body: Egyptian Football Association
- Founded: 1948; 78 years ago (officially); 2023; 3 years ago (as Egyptian Second Division B)
- First season: 2023–24
- Country: Egypt
- Number of clubs: 56 (4 groups of 14; expected)
- Level on pyramid: 3
- Promotion to: Egyptian Second Division A
- Relegation to: Egyptian Third Division
- Domestic cup: Egypt Cup
- International cup(s): CAF Confederation Cup (via winning Egypt Cup)

The Egyptian Second Division B (Arabic: دوري القسم الثاني المصري "ب") is the third tier of the Egyptian football league system starting from the 2023–24 season. It replaces the Egyptian Third Division on the pyramid. It is administered by the Egyptian Football Association. It is below the second professional league in the country, the Egyptian Second Division A, and above the Egyptian Third Division.

== History ==
In 2022, after Gamal Allam was elected for the presidency of the EFA, the idea to restructure the old Egyptian Second Division emerged again, and a series of major changes were announced. This was confirmed later the same year, and it was announced that the second division will be abolished, and two new leagues, known as Second Division A and Second Division B, will be created as the new second and third tier leagues, respectively, with the latter retaining a format similar to the one used by the old second division.

The reformation decision meant that the 2022–23 Egyptian Second Division season will be the last edition of the competition, which will see 28 out of the 48 participating teams earning a spot in the inaugural season of the Egyptian Second Division B.

== League format ==
The league will consists of 56 teams divided into three groups. The format was confirmed by the president of the Egyptian Football Association's Competition Committee, Amer Hussein, on 19 June 2023, during an interview. The first placed team in each group will qualify to a promotion play-off round, alongside the third placed team in the Egyptian Second Division A, where the winners of that round will earn promotion to the Egyptian Premier League, while the remaining three teams will participate in the Second Division A. This means that there's a chance for Second Division B sides to earn promotion directly to the Premier League without playing in the Second Division A. Teams finishing in the bottom four from each group will be relegated to the Third Division.

Like other divisions in Egypt, it will take place annually, beginning in September, and ending in June of the following year. Teams play each other twice, home and away, for a total of thirty-four matches per group. All teams are eligible to participate in the Egypt Cup, given they pay the entrance fee.
