= List of Egyptian Premier League clubs =

The following is a list of clubs who have played in the Egyptian Premier League since its formation in 1948 to the current season. All statistics here refer to time in the league only, with the exception of 'Most Recent Finish' (which refers to all levels of play) and 'Last Promotion' (which refers to the club's last promotion from the second tier of Egyptian football). Egyptian Premier League teams playing in the 2018–19 season are indicated in bold, while founding members are shown in italics. If the longest spell is the current spell, this is shown in bold, and if the highest finish is that of the most recent season, then this is also shown in bold.

As of the 2018–19 season, sixty-nine teams have played in the Egyptian Premier League. Five of the eleven founder members of the league are competing in the 2018–19 season. Only two clubs (Al Ahly and Zamalek) have contested every season of the league since its formation. Three teams (Ismaily, Al Ittihad, and Al Masry) were also founder members, though each team has been relegated at least once in the past.

As of the 2018–19 season, eight clubs, El Dakhleya, ENPPI, Misr Lel Makkasa, Nogoom, Petrojet, Smouha, Tala'ea El Gaish and Wadi Degla, are not founding members of the Egyptian Premier League, but have never been relegated since their debut in the league.

== Table ==
Club	Governorate	Total seasons (Note: All appearances made in any suspended or not completed season are not included.)	Total spells	Longest spell	Most recent promotion	Most recent relegation	Seasons (Note: The following seasons has been cancelled or suspended due to different reasons: 1951–52, 1954–55, 1967–68, 1968–69, 1969–70, 1970–71, 1971–72, 1973–74, 1989–90, 2011–12, and 2012–13.)	Most recent finish	Highest finish
**Al Ahly**	Cairo	60	1	**60**	Founding member, no promotion	Never relegated	**1948–**	1st	1st
Ala'ab Damanhour	Beheira	6	4	2	2013–14	2014–15	1962–64; 1978–80; 1991–92; 2014–15	Second Division; Group C 11th	8th (Note: 8th in Group B, 18th on overall standings.)
Al Aluminium	Qena	5	4	2	2006–07	2007–08	1995–97; 1999–2000; 2005–06; 2007–08	Second Division; Group A 5th	12th
Asyut Cement	Asyut	2	1	2	2003–04	2005–06	2004–06	Fourth Division; Group C 1st (promoted)	11th
Asyut Petroleum	Asyut	3	2	2	2007–08	2009–10	2006–07; 2008–10	Third Division; Group B 2nd	13th
Aswan	Aswan	9	5	3	2014–15	2016–17	1990–91; 1994–95; 1996–99; 2002–04; 2015–17	Second Division; Group A 3rd	9th
Athletic Union of Greek Alexandria	Alexandria	2	1	2	Founding member, no promotion	1949–50	1948–50	Club dissolved	10th
Aviation Club	Cairo	9	2	6	1964–65	1977–78	1962–64; 1965–77	Third Division; Group D 6th	7th (Note: 7th in Group B, 15th on overall standings.)
El Baharia	Alexandria	2	1	2	1961–62	1963–64	1962–64	Club dissolved	8th (Note: 8th in Group A, 14th on overall standings.)
Baladeyet El Mahalla	Gharbia	12	3	7	2006–07	2007–08	1992–99; 2001–05; 2007–08	Second Division; Group C 3rd	5th
Belkas	Dakahlia	1	1	1	1974–75	1975–76	1975–76	Third Division; Group D 4th	11th (Note: 11th in Group A, 20th on overall standings.)
Beni Suef	Beni Suef	4	2	2	1973–74	1975–76	1962–64; 1974–76	Second Division; Group A 4th	9th (Note: 9th in Group B, 19th on overall standings.)
**El Dakhleya**	Cairo	6	1	**6**	2010–11	Never relegated	**2013–**	14th	6th (Note: 6th in Group A, 11th on overall standings.)
Damietta	Damietta	8	4	4	1994–95	1995–96	1962–64; 1966–76; 1982–83; 1995–96	Third Division; Group F 1st (promoted)	7th (Note: 7th in Group A, 13th on overall standings.)
Dina Farms (Note: The club played as Ittihad Osman during the 1994–95 and 1996–97 seasons.)	Cairo	6	2	5	1995–96	2000–01	1994–95; 1996–01	Club dissolved	6th
**ENPPI**	Cairo	15	1	**15**	2001–02	Never relegated	**2002–**	6th	2nd
**El Entag El Harby**	Cairo	7	2	**4**	2014–15	2013–14	2009–14; **2015–**	7th	7th
Esco	Cairo	6	2	3	1978–79	1981–82	1975–78; 1979–82	Third Division; Group D 5th	5th
Factory 36	Cairo	3	3	1	1978–79	1979–80	1975–76; 1977–78; 1979–80	Club dissolved	10th (Note: 10th in Group B, 21st on overall standings.)
Ghazl Damietta	Damietta	5	3	2	1985–86	1987–88	1981–83; 1984–85; 1986–88	Third Division; Group F 6th	9th
Ghazl El Mahalla	Gharbia	47	5	33	2014–15	2015–16	1956–96; 1997–99; 2000–10; 2013–14; 2015–16	Second Division; Group C 7th	1st
Ghazl Suez	Suez	2	2	1	2000–01	2001–02	1997–98; 2001–02	Third Division; Group E 9th	12th
Goldi (Note: The club played as El Maa'den during the 1999–2000, 2000–01 and 2001–02 seasons.)	Cairo	4	1	4	1998–99	2002–03	1998–03	Third Division; Group C 2nd	6th
Gomhoriat Shebin	Monufia	6	2	5	1991–92	1996–97	1990–91; 1992–97	Second Division; Group B 9th	7th
**El Gouna**	Red Sea	5	2	4	2017–18	2014–15	2009–15; **2018–**	Second Division; Group A 1st (promoted)	5th (Note: 5th in Group A, 9th on overall standings.)
**Haras El Hodoud** (Note: The club played as Khafr El Sawahel during the 1963–64 and 1964–65 seasons.)	Alexandria	15	3	12	2017–18	2015–16	1963–65; 2002–16; **2018–**	Second Division; Group C 1st (promoted)	3rd
**Ismaily**	Ismailia	56	2	**48**	1961–62	1957–58	1948–58; **1962–**	2nd	1st
**Al Ittihad**	Alexandria	58	3	**49**	1960–61	1959–60	1948–58; 1959–60; **1961–**	11th	3rd
Ittihad El Shorta (Note: The club played as El Shorta during the 1975–76 season.)	Cairo	7	2	6	2007–08	2015–16	1975–76; 2008–16	Second Division; Group B 13th (relegated)	4th
Ittihad Suez	Suez	10	2	9	1964–65	1965–66	1955–64; 1965–66	Club dissolved (Note: Club merged with Montakhab Suez.)	5th
Jute Bilbeis	Sharkia	1	1	1	1976–77	1977–78	1977–78	Club dissolved	14th
Kafr El Sheikh	Kafr El Sheikh	2	1	2	1974–75	1976–77	1975–77	Second Division; Group C 2nd	5th (Note: 5th in Group B, 13th on overall standings.)
El Koroum	Alexandria	11	7	3	2004–05	2005–06	1979–81; 1982–84; 1990–91; 1996–97; 1998–2001; 2003–04; 2005–06	Club dissolved	7th
Maleyat Kafr El Zayat	Gharbia	3	2	2	1961–62	1963–64	1957–58; 1962–64	Third Division; Group H 2nd	8th (Note: 8th in Group B, 16th on overall standings.)
El Mansoura	Dakahlia	30	8	10	2008–09	2009–10	1955–58; 1962–64; 1974–82; 1984–87; 1990–92; 1993–94; 1995–2005; 2009–10	Second Division; Group C 5th	3rd
**Al Masry**	Port Said	57	3	**48**	1961–62	1960–61	1948–58; 1960–61; **1962–**	3rd	3rd
Al Merreikh	Port Said	8	2	7	1995–96	1996–97	1986–94; 1996–97	Second Division; Group B 7th	9th
El Minya	Minya	14	7	6	2012–13	2013–14	1962–63; 1974–76; 1980–86; 1988–91; 1992–93; 1997–98; 2013–14	Second Division; Group A 2nd	7th
**Misr Lel Makkasa**	Faiyum	7	1	**7**	2009–10	Never relegated	**2010–**	8th	2nd
**Al Mokawloon Al Arab**	Cairo	35	3	13	2004–05	2002–03	1978–92; 1993–2003; **2005–**	10th	1st
Montakhab Suez	Suez	15	5	6	1998–99	1999–2000	1974–80; 1985–87; 1988–91; 1994–98; 1999–2000	Second Division; Group B 8th	6th
Naseg Helwan	Cairo	1	1	1	1986–87	1987–88	1987–88	Club dissolved	12th
Al Nasr	Cairo	2	2	1	2016–17	2017–18	2014–15; 2017–18	18th (relegated)	18th
Al Nasr Lel Taa'den	Aswan	1	1	1	2015–16	2016–17	2016–17	Second Division; Group A 7th	17th
**Nogoom**	Cairo	1	1	**1**	2017–18	Never relegated	**2018–**	Second Division; Group B 1st (promoted)	N/A (Note: First ever season in the Egyptian Premier League.)
Olympic Club	Alexandria	39	4	29	2007–08	2008–09	1948–85; 1987–96; 2006–07; 2008–09	Second Division; Group C 8th	1st
**Petrojet**	Suez	11	1	**11**	2005–06	Never relegated	**2006–**	12th	2nd (Note: 2nd in Group B, 4th on overall standings.)
Port Fouad	Port Said	7	3	4	1989–90	1990–91	1948–53; 1962–64; 1990–91	Third Division; Group F 2nd	6th
**Pyramids** (Note: The club played as Al Assiouty Sport during the 2014–15 and 2017–18 seasons.)	Cairo (Note: The club headquarters was located in Beni Suef until it was sold in 2018, and was moved to Cairo.)	3	2	**2**	2016–17	2014–15	2014–15; **2017–**	9th	**9th**
El Qanah	Suez	28	5	12	2012–13	2013–14	1953–66; 1972–76; 1991–2002; 2003–04; 2013–14	Second Division; Group B 5th	2nd (Note: 2nd in Group A, 6th on overall standings.)
El Raja	Matruh	3	2	2	2016–17	2017–18	2013–15; 2017–18	16th (relegated)	9th (Note: 9th in Group A, 19th on overall standings.)
Sekak Hadid Sohag	Sohag	1	1	1	1999–2000	2000–01	2000–01	Club dissolved	14th
El Sekka El Hadid	Cairo	23	5	11	1989–90	1992–93	1948–54; 1956–67; 1974–77; 1980–81; 1990–93	Third Division; Group D 1st	3rd (Note: 3rd in Group B, 6th on overall standings.)
El Shams	Cairo	1	1	1	1996–97	1997–98	1997–98	Second Division; Group B 6th	16th
El Sharkia	Sharkia	5	3	2	2015–16	2016–17	1974–76; 1998–2000; 2016–17	Second Division; Group B 11th (relegated)	9th
Shubra El Kheima (Note: The club played as Plastic during all of their seasons in the Egyptian Premier League.)	Qalyubia	8	4	5	1984–85	1985–86	1972–78; 1981–82; 1983–84; 1985–86	Third Division; Group D 2nd	7th (Note: 7th in Group A, 10th on overall standings.)
**Smouha**	Alexandria	7	1	**7**	2009–10	Never relegated	**2010–**	5th	2nd
Sohag	Sohag	1	1	1	2000–01	2001–02	2001–02	Second Division; Group A 9th	14th
Suez	Suez	5	3	3	1965–66	1966–67	1957–58; 1962–65; 1966–67	Club dissolved (Note: Club merged with Montakhab Suez.)	5th (Note: 5th in Group B, 10th on overall standings.)
Suez Cement	Suez	4	1	4	2003–04	2007–08	2004–08	Club dissolved	5th
Suez Petroleum	Suez	2	1	2	1961–62	1963–64	1962–64	Club dissolved	11th (Note: 11th in Group A, 23rd on overall standings.)
**Tala'ea El Gaish**	Cairo	13	1	**13**	2003–04	Never relegated	**2004–**	13th	4th
Tanta	Gharbia	14	6	8	2015–16	2017–18	1956–64; 1975–76; 1979–80; 1992–93; 2006–07; 2016–18	17th (relegated)	5th
Telecom Egypt	Cairo	2	1	2	2006–07	2008–09	2007–09	Third Division; Group D 3rd	13th
Telephonat Beni Suef	Beni Suef	1	1	1	2010–11	2013–14	2013–14	Second Division; Group A 6th	9th (Note: 9th in Group B, 17th on overall standings.)
El Teram	Alexandria	10	3	7	1961–62	1963–64	1948–49; 1950–59; 1962–64	Third Division; Group M 3rd	3rd (Note: 3rd in Group A, 5th on overall standings.)
Tersana	Giza	44	6	2005–06	2008–09	16	1948–82; 1983–92; 1993–94; 2000–05; 2006–09	Second Division; Group B 2nd	1st
**Wadi Degla**	Cairo	7	1	**7**	2009–10	Never relegated	**2010–**	15th	5th
**Zamalek** (Note: The club played as Farouk during the 1948–49, 1949–50 and 1950–51 seasons.)	Giza	60	1	**60**	Founding member, no promotion	Never relegated	**1948–**	4th	1st

El Mansoura have had the most separate spells in the Egyptian Premier League, with eight; two of their spells lasted a single season. The club were relegated for the first time during the 1957–58 season after losing the relegation play-offs, but managed to reach the top tier again after four seasons. This was one of the few seasons that the league had a relegation play-off competition instead of direct relegation. Their second spell in the Egyptian Premier League lasted only two years, finishing last in both seasons. They finished last in Group B of the 1962–63 season but won the relegation play-offs after they won against El Minya, who were last in Group A. In the 1963–64 season, they were automatically relegated and no relegation play-off competition was held. The club promoted again in 1974 and managed to stay at the top tier until the 1981–82 season; they finished second from bottom and relegated with four points away from the safe spot. Three years later, managed to promote to the Egyptian Premier League again but they were relegated during the 1986–87 season after finishing last again, but with only two points away from the safe spot. They gained promotion again in 1990 and stayed at the top tier for two years, until they got relegated after finishing last again in the 1991–92 season. They were promoted in the next season, but then suffered from an immediate relegation in the 1993–94 season, but managed to return to the Egyptian Premier League again after only season; which was the start of their best spell. They remained in the Egyptian Premier League for 10 consecutive seasons, with the 1996–97 season being their best by finishing third. They were relegated at the end of the 2004–05 season after finishing last. After spending four seasons in the Egyptian Second Division, they managed to gain promotion to the Egyptian Premier League; but suffered an immediate return to the Egyptian Second Division as they finished second from bottom on goal difference in the 2009–10 season.

Ittihad Suez and Suez were both members of the Egyptian Premier League during the fifties and sixties, but later merged with Montakhab Suez to form one club representing the governorate, which played in the Egyptian Premier League for fifteen seasons.
