= Hossam Ashour =

Egyptian footballer (born 1986)

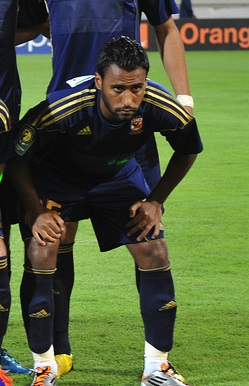
- Ashour with Al Ahly in 2011

Personal information
- Full name: Hossam Mohamed Ashour Sanad Atia
- Date of birth: 9 March 1986 (age 40)
- Place of birth: Cairo, Egypt
- Height: 1.75 m (5 ft 9 in)
- Position: Defensive midfielder

Youth career
- Al Ahly

Senior career*
Years	Team	Apps	(Gls)
2003–2020	Al Ahly	286	(3)
2020–2022	Al Ittihad	8	(0)

International career
2005	Egypt U20	1	(0)
2008–2018	Egypt	14	(0)
- * Club domestic league appearances and goals

Hossam Mohamed Ashour Sanad Atia (Arabic: حُسَام مُحَمَّد عَاشُور سَنَد عَطِيَّة, born 9 March 1986) is an Egyptian former footballer who played as a defensive midfielder.

After progressing through the club's youth system, Ashour established himself in the first team of Al Ahly and became one of the most decorated footballers with a single club. He has made more than 500 appearances in all competitions.

Having represented Egypt at under-20 level, he made his senior international debut for Egypt in 2008 and won 14 caps in total.

== Club career ==
Born in Cairo, Ashour began his career in the youth system at Al Ahly before being promoted to the first team at the age of seventeen by manager Manuel José de Jesus after attracting his attention in a youth training session. He made his debut in the Egyptian Premier League during the 2003–04 season during a march against El Mansoura. He became the youngest player in the club's history to captain the side in a match against Ittihad El Shorta during the 2009–10 season after club captain Osama Hosny was substituted.

In 2014, Ashour made his 100th appearance in the CAF Champions League during a match against Tanzanian side Young Africans, becoming only the fourth Al-Ahly player reach the tally after Essam El-Hadary, Wael Gomaa and Shady Mohamed.

In May 2017, Ashour was banned for four matches and fined 40,000 Egyptian pounds after being charged with assaulting a referee. Al Ahly manager Hossam El-Badry was also charged for an incident with the referee during the match. Ashour was appointed club captain in his thirteenth year with Al Ahly, winning his first trophy as captain in January 2018 in a 1–0 victory over Al-Masry in the 2017 Egyptian Super Cup. The trophy was his 33rd senior trophy for the club, making him the most decorated player in the club's history.

He planned to retire at end of season in 2020. In October 2020, after disagreements with Al Ahly, he decided to not retire yet and instead joined Al Ittihad.

== International career ==
=== Youth ===
Ashour represented Egypt at under-20 level, playing in the 2005 African Youth Championship in Benin as the side finished as runners-up to Nigeria. He also played for the side at the 2005 FIFA World Youth Championship as Egypt were eliminated in the group stage. He later played for the Egypt Olympic squad.

=== Senior ===
Ashour made his debut for the Egypt senior side in a 4–0 defeat to Sudan on 20 August 2008.

== Honours ==
Al Ahly

- Egyptian Premier League: 2004–05, 2005–06, 2006–07, 2007–08, 2008–09, 2009–10, 2010–11, 2013–14, 2015–16, 2016–17, 2017–18, 2018–19, 2019–20
- Egypt Cup: 2005–06, 2006–07, 2016–17, 2019–20
- Egyptian Super Cup: 2005, 2006, 2007, 2008, 2010, 2012, 2014, 2015, 2018, 2019
- CAF Champions League: 2005, 2006, 2008, 2012, 2013, 2019–20
- CAF Confederation Cup: 2014
- CAF Super Cup: 2006, 2007, 2009, 2013, 2014

Sporting positions
Preceded by Emad Moteab	Al Ahly SC captain 2018–2020	Succeeded by Ahmed Fathy
