= Shady Mohamed =

Egyptian footballer (born 1977)

Personal information
- Full name: Shady Mohamed Abdel Fattah Ragab
- Date of birth: 29 November 1977 (age 48)
- Place of birth: Alexandria, Egypt
- Height: 1.80 m (5 ft 11 in)
- Position: Centre back

Team information
- Current team: Al Ahly FC Women(Football director)

Youth career
- El Koroum

Senior career*
Years	Team	Apps	(Gls)
1997–1999	El Koroum	22	(1)
1999–2009	Al Ahly	203	(6)
2009–2010	Al Ittihad Alexandria	23	(1)
2010–2011	Ismaily	22	(1)
2011–2012	Telephonat Beni Suef	15	(3)
Total		285	(12)

International career
2000–2008	Egypt	23	(0)
Medal record
Men's football
Representing Egypt
Africa Cup of Nations
Winner	2008 Ghana
- * Club domestic league appearances and goals

Shady Mohamed Abdel Fattah Ragab (Arabic: شَادِي مُحَمَّد عَبْد الْفَتَّاح رَجَب; born 29 November 1977) is an Egyptian retired professional footballer who played as a centre back.

== Honours and achievements ==
=== Club ===
Al Ahly

- Egyptian Premier League: 1999–00, 2004–05, 2005–06, 2006–07, 2007–08, 2008–09
- CAF Champions League: 2001, 2005, 2006, 2008
- CAF Super Cup: 2002, 2006, 2007, 2009
- Egypt Cup: 2001, 2003, 2006, 2007
- Egyptian Super Cup: 2003, 2005, 2006, 2007, 2008
- FIFA Club World Cup third place: 2006

=== International ===
Egypt

- African Cup of Nations: 2008
