= 2012–13 Egyptian Second Division =

Egyptian Second Division
- Season: 2012–13
- Promoted: (Group 1); Aswan; Sohag; Tadeen (Group 2); El Minya (Won play-offs); Petrol Assiut; Hawamdia (Group 3); Al Nasr; El Sekka; Tersana (Group 4); Qanah FC (Won play-offs); Kahrbaa Ismailia; Sharkia (Group 5); Tanta FC; Mansoura; Baladya (Group 6); Al Ragaa SC (Won play-offs); Malya; Abu Qair

The 2012–13 Egyptian Second Division was the 2012–13 season of the Egyptian Second Division competition. A total of 69 teams are divided into 6 groups based on geographical distribution. The top 2 teams of each group promotes to Promotion play-offs for season (Egyptian Premier League), The Season started on 14 November 2012.

== Group 1 ==
Pos	Team	Pld	W	D	L	GF	GA	GD	Pts	Qualification
1	? (Q)	22	13	6	3	34	13	+21	45	Qualification for Promotion Playoff
2	? (Q)	22	11	6	5	45	25	+20	39	Qualification for Promotion Playoff
3	? (Q)	22	11	6	5	43	32	+11	39	Qualification for Promotion Playoff
4	?	22	10	4	8	38	29	+9	34	
5	?	22	7	11	4	25	20	+5	32	
6	?	22	8	7	7	23	25	−2	31	
7	?	22	7	9	6	21	17	+4	30	
8	?	22	6	9	7	19	25	−6	27	
9	?	22	5	7	10	14	23	−9	22	
10	?	22	5	6	11	20	44	−24	21	
11	?	22	4	6	12	23	36	−13	18	
12	?	22	4	5	13	17	33	−16	17	

(Q) Qualified for the phase indicated

== Group 2 ==
Pos	Team	Pld	W	D	L	GF	GA	GD	Pts	Qualification
1	? (Q)	22	14	4	4	35	22	+13	46	Qualification for Promotion Playoff
2	? (Q)	22	13	6	3	48	26	+22	45	Qualification for Promotion Playoff
3	? (Q)	22	13	5	4	26	17	+9	44	Qualification for Promotion Playoff
4	?	22	10	7	5	25	17	+8	37	
5	?	22	9	5	8	32	22	+10	32	
6	?	22	7	7	8	39	35	+4	28	
7	?	22	7	6	9	26	30	−4	27	
8	?	22	6	7	9	21	30	−9	25	
9	?	22	6	6	10	23	33	−10	24	
10	?	22	4	11	7	24	25	−1	23	
11	?	22	3	8	11	15	31	−16	17	
12	?	22	2	4	16	17	43	−26	10	

(Q) Qualified for the phase indicated

== Group 3 ==
Pos	Team	Pld	W	D	L	GF	GA	GD	Pts	Qualification
1	? (Q)	22	12	7	3	43	22	+21	43	Qualification for Promotion Playoff
2	? (Q)	22	11	5	6	33	19	+14	38	Qualification for Promotion Playoff
3	? (Q)	22	10	7	5	30	25	+5	37	Qualification for Promotion Playoff
4	?	22	10	5	7	29	15	+14	35	
5	?	22	10	5	7	29	21	+8	35	
6	?	22	8	11	3	28	22	+6	35	
7	?	22	6	10	6	32	25	+7	28	
8	?	22	7	5	10	20	30	−10	26	
9	?	22	6	7	9	22	25	−3	25	
10	?	22	5	7	10	19	32	−13	22	
11	?	22	5	4	13	24	47	−23	19	
12	?	22	5	1	16	15	41	−26	16	

(Q) Qualified for the phase indicated

== Group 4 ==
Pos	Team	Pld	W	D	L	GF	GA	GD	Pts	Qualification
1	? (Q)	20	11	7	2	22	8	+14	40	Qualification for Promotion Playoff
2	? (Q)	20	10	6	4	27	13	+14	36	Qualification for Promotion Playoff
3	? (Q)	20	10	6	4	24	14	+10	36	Qualification for Promotion Playoff
4	?	20	8	9	3	27	16	+11	33	
5	?	20	9	2	9	18	20	−2	29	
6	?	20	6	8	6	25	23	+2	26	
7	?	20	7	3	10	16	21	−5	24	
8	?	20	7	2	11	20	28	−8	23	
9	?	20	6	4	10	28	28	0	22	
10	?	20	5	3	12	12	35	−23	18	
11	?	20	3	6	11	16	29	−13	15	

(Q) Qualified for the phase indicated

== Group 5 ==
Pos	Team	Pld	W	D	L	GF	GA	GD	Pts	Qualification
1	? (Q)	20	15	3	2	39	13	+26	48	Qualification for Promotion Playoff
2	? (Q)	20	11	8	1	39	14	+25	41	Qualification for Promotion Playoff
3	? (Q)	20	9	8	3	36	17	+19	35	Qualification for Promotion Playoff
4	?	20	9	4	7	25	22	+3	31	
5	?	20	7	5	8	21	22	−1	26	
6	?	20	8	2	10	17	23	−6	26	
7	?	20	7	4	9	24	26	−2	25	
8	?	20	5	9	6	17	24	−7	24	
9	?	20	5	6	9	16	21	−5	21	
10	?	20	1	9	10	10	31	−21	12	
11	?	20	2	4	14	11	42	−31	10	

(Q) Qualified for the phase indicated

== Group 6 ==
Pos	Team	Pld	W	D	L	GF	GA	GD	Pts	Qualification
1	? (Q)	20	11	5	4	31	15	+16	38	Qualification for Promotion Playoff
2	? (Q)	20	10	7	3	30	16	+14	37	Qualification for Promotion Playoff
3	? (Q)	20	9	9	2	27	11	+16	36	Qualification for Promotion Playoff
4	?	20	9	8	3	26	14	+12	35	
5	?	20	6	8	6	17	16	+1	26	
6	?	20	7	5	8	18	20	−2	26	
7	?	20	6	7	7	23	21	+2	25	
8	?	20	5	5	10	17	31	−14	20	
9	?	20	3	10	7	19	19	0	19	
10	?	20	4	6	10	14	31	−17	18	
11	?	20	2	6	12	18	46	−28	12	

(Q) Qualified for the phase indicated

== Group 4 ==
Pos	Team	Pld	W	D	L	GF	GA	GD	Pts	Qualification or relegation
1	Al Qana (Q)	20	11	2	7	22	8	+14	35	Qualification for Promotion Playoff
2	Kahrbaa Ismailia (Q)	20	10	4	6	27	13	+14	34	Qualification for Promotion Playoff
3	El Sharkia (Q)	20	10	4	6	24	14	+10	34	Qualification for Promotion Playoff
4	Suez Montakhab	0	0	0	0	0	0	0	0	
5	Al Zarqa	0	0	0	0	0	0	0	0	
6	El-Marekh	0	0	0	0	0	0	0	0	
7	Domiat Club	0	0	0	0	0	0	0	0	
8	Ghazl Suez	0	0	0	0	0	0	0	0	
9	Suez Cement	0	0	0	0	0	0	0	0	
10	Met Al Kholy	0	0	0	0	0	0	0	0	
11	Port Fuad FC	0	0	0	0	0	0	0	0	

(Q) Qualified for the phase indicated

== Group A ==
Pos	Team	Pld	W	D	L	GF	GA	GD	Pts
1	El Minya FC	5	3	2	0	14	5	+9	11
2	?	5	1	4	0	6	5	+1	7
3	?	5	2	1	2	6	5	+1	7
4	?	5	1	3	1	11	9	+2	6
5	?	5	1	3	1	7	10	−3	6
6	?	5	0	1	4	5	15	−10	1

== Group B ==
Pos	Team	Pld	W	D	L	GF	GA	GD	Pts
1	El Qanah	5	3	1	1	10	4	+6	10
2	?	5	3	1	1	9	6	+3	10
3	?	5	2	2	1	8	8	0	8
4	?	5	1	4	0	5	4	+1	7
5	?	5	1	0	4	9	14	−5	3
6	?	5	0	2	3	6	11	−5	2

== Group C ==
Pos	Team	Pld	W	D	L	GF	GA	GD	Pts
1	Al Ragaa	5	2	2	1	6	5	+1	8
2	?	5	2	2	1	3	2	+1	8
3	?	5	2	1	2	7	4	+3	7
4	?	5	1	4	0	5	4	+1	7
5	?	5	1	2	2	2	6	−4	5
6	?	5	1	1	3	3	5	−2	4
