= 2005–06 Egyptian Second Division =

Egyptian Second Division
- Season: 2005–06
- Promoted: Petrojet (Group A); Tersana (Group A); El-Olympi (Group B); Tanta FC (Group B); Asyut Petroleum (Group C)
- Relegated: (Group A) (Group B) (Group C)

The 2005–06 Egyptian Second Division was the 2005–06 season of the Egyptian Second Division competition. A total of 40 teams are divided into groups based on geographical distribution. The top team of each group promotes to the highest Egyptian football level; Egyptian Premier League.

== Changes before the season ==
=== Teams Relegated from 2004-05 Egyptian Premier Division ===
- Baladeyet El-Mahalla 14th (Group B)
- Tersana 15th (Group A)
- Mansoura 16th (Group B)

== Teams Promoted and Relegated after 2005-06 Egyptian Second Division ==
=== Teams Promoted to 2006-07 Egyptian Premier League ===
Group A

- Petrojet
- Tersana

Group B

- El-Olympi
- Tanta FC

Group C

- Asyut Petroleum

=== Teams Relegated to 2006-07 Egyptian Third Division ===
Group A

Group B

Group C

== League tables ==
=== Promotion groups ===
==== Group A ====
Pos	Team	Pld	W	D	L	GF	GA	GD	Pts	Promotion
1	Petrojet (C, Q)	10	7	2	1	14	6	+8	23	Promotion to 2006–07 Egyptian Premier League
2	Tersana (Q)	10	5	3	2	14	12	+2	18	Promotion to 2006–07 Egyptian Premier League
3	Olympic El Qanal FC	10	4	5	1	9	4	+5	17	
4	El Shams Club	10	3	3	4	13	13	0	12	
5	Al-Rebat We Al-Anwar	10	2	3	5	7	10	−3	9	
6	Al-Sekka Al-Hadid	10	0	2	8	6	18	−12	2	

Source: rsssf.com and goalzz.com
(C) Champions; (Q) Qualified for the phase indicated
- Top teams qualify for the 2006–07 Egyptian Premier League.
- Bottom teams are relegated to

==== Group B ====
Pos	Team	Pld	W	D	L	GF	GA	GD	Pts	Promotion
1	El-Olympi (C, Q)	10	7	3	0	21	10	+11	24	Promotion to 2006–07 Egyptian Premier League
2	Tanta FC (Q)	10	5	5	0	13	4	+9	20	Promotion to 2006–07 Egyptian Premier League
3	Maleyeit Kafr El-Zayat	10	5	4	1	11	6	+5	19	
4	Baladeyet El-Mahalla	10	3	3	4	14	12	+2	12	
5	Talkha Electricity FC	9	0	2	7	7	20	−13	2	
6	Samanoud FC	9	0	1	8	6	20	−14	1	

Source: rsssf.com and goalzz.com
(C) Champions; (Q) Qualified for the phase indicated
- Top teams qualify for the 2006–07 Egyptian Premier League.
- Bottom teams are relegated to

==== Group C ====
Pos	Team	Pld	W	D	L	GF	GA	GD	Pts	Promotion
1	Asyut Petroleum (C, Q)	6	5	0	1	9	3	+6	15	Promotion to 2006–07 Egyptian Premier League
2	Telephonaat Bani Suweif FC	6	3	2	1	5	4	+1	11	
3	El Gouna FC	5	1	1	3	6	8	−2	4	
4	Nile Sohag FC	5	0	1	4	2	7	−5	1	

Source: rsssf.com and goalzz.com
(C) Champions; (Q) Qualified for the phase indicated
- Top teams qualify for the 2006–07 Egyptian Premier League.
- Bottom teams are relegated to

=== Relegation groups ===
==== Group A ====
Pos	Team	Pld	W	D	L	GF	GA	GD	Pts
1	Ala'ab Damanhour	8	6	1	1	15	7	+8	19
2	Meiah Al-Beheira	8	4	2	2	13	5	+8	14
3	Bani Ebeid Club	9	2	3	4	5	13	−8	9
4	Domiat Club	6	2	2	2	7	6	+1	8
5	Kafr Al-Sheikh	7	2	2	3	6	6	0	8
6	Monyet El-Nasr FC	6	0	2	4	3	12	−9	2

Source: rsssf.com and goalzz.com
- Top teams qualify for
- Bottom teams are relegated to the Egyptian Third Division for the 2006–07 season.

==== Group B ====
Pos	Team	Pld	W	D	L	GF	GA	GD	Pts
1	Mansoura	8	3	5	0	11	4	+7	14
2	El Henawy FC	7	3	3	1	7	3	+4	12
3	Smouha	6	2	2	2	4	4	0	8
4	Nabarouh	8	1	5	2	4	6	−2	8
5	Al-Zarqa	8	1	4	3	1	8	−7	7
6	El-Teram	7	0	5	2	2	4	−2	5

Source: rsssf.com and goalzz.com
- Top teams qualify for
- Bottom teams are relegated to the Egyptian Third Division for the 2006–07 season.

==== Group C ====
Pos	Team	Pld	W	D	L	GF	GA	GD	Pts
1	El-Mostakbal FC	4	1	3	0	5	4	+1	6
2	Itesalat	3	1	2	0	5	3	+2	5
3	Sharquia Leldukhan FC	4	1	2	1	5	4	+1	5
4	Gomhoreyat Shepin FC	4	1	2	1	6	6	0	5
5	Al Mareekh FC	3	1	1	1	5	4	+1	4
6	Kahraba Alasmalia FC	3	0	1	2	2	7	−5	1

Source: rsssf.com and goalzz.com
- Top teams qualify for
- Bottom teams are relegated to the Egyptian Third Division for the 2006–07 season.

==== Group D ====
Pos	Team	Pld	W	D	L	GF	GA	GD	Pts
1	Banha FC	6	4	0	2	9	5	+4	12
2	Ittihad El-Shorta	5	2	3	0	9	6	+3	9
3	El Sharkia SC	6	2	3	1	5	5	0	9
4	Montakhab El-Suez FC	5	1	3	1	5	5	0	6
5	El Dakhleya FC	5	1	2	2	9	7	+2	5
6	Ghazl El Suez FC	6	0	2	4	3	12	−9	2

Source: rsssf.com and goalzz.com
- Top teams qualify for
- Bottom teams are relegated to the Egyptian Third Division for the 2006–07 season.
