= 2000–01 Egyptian Premier League =

Egyptian Premier League
- Season: 2000–01
- Dates: 15 September 2000 – 16 May 2001
- Champions: Al-Zamalek; 9th Egyptian Premier League title
- Relegated: Dina Farms; El-Koroum; Sohag Railways
- Champions League: Al-Zamalek; Al Ahly
- African Cup Winners' Cup: Al Masry
- Matches: 182
- Goals: 427 (2.35 per match)
- Top goalscorer: Tarek El-Said (13 goals)
- Biggest home win: Al Masry 4–0 Sohag Railways (20 September 2000), Dina Farms 5-1 Sohag Railways (15 May 2001)
- Biggest away win: Tersana SC 0–6 Al Ahly (22 October 2000)
- Highest scoring: Sohag Railways 3–4 Al Ahly (28 April 2001)
- Longest winning run: 7 games Al-Zamalek
- Longest unbeaten run: 21 games Al Masry
- Longest winless run: 21 games El-Koroum
- Longest losing run: 7 games Sohag Railways

The 2000–01 Egyptian Premier League is the Forty-fourth season of the Egyptian Premier League since its establishment in 1948. It was only consisting of one group of 14 teams. It started on September 15, 2000.

== Teams ==
Locations of the 2000–01 Egyptian Premier League
- Al-Ahly
- El-Ittihad
- El Mansoura SC
- Al-Masry
- Al Mokawloon
- El Qanah
- El Koroum
- Dina Farms
- Ismaily
- Ghazl Al-Mehalla
- Maaden
- Sohag Railways
- Tersana
- Zamalek SC

== League table ==
Pos	Team	Pld	W	D	L	GF	GA	GD	Pts	Qualification or relegation
1	Zamalek SC	26	20	5	1	54	18	+36	65	2002 CAF Champions League
2	Al-Ahly	26	17	6	3	42	17	+25	57	2002 CAF Champions League
3	Al-Masry	26	11	13	2	36	17	+19	46	2002 CAF Cup
4	Ismaily	26	11	10	5	32	19	+13	43	
5	El Qanah	26	11	9	6	26	18	+8	42	
6	El Mansoura SC	26	10	6	10	27	25	+2	36	
7	Maaden	26	8	9	9	35	32	+3	33	
8	Al Mokawloon	26	8	8	10	26	29	−3	32	
9	El-Ittihad	26	8	5	13	27	40	−13	29	
10	Ghazl Al-Mehalla	26	5	13	8	18	23	−5	28	2002 African Cup Winners' Cup
11	Tersana	26	6	9	11	33	45	−12	27	
12	Dina Farms	26	6	7	13	23	35	−12	25	Relegation to Egyptian Second Division 2001-02
13	El Koroum	26	1	10	15	18	42	−24	13	Relegation to Egyptian Second Division 2001-02
14	Sohag Railways	26	2	6	18	14	51	−37	12	Relegation to Egyptian Second Division 2001-02

Source: http://www.kooora.com/?c=1584
Rules for classification: 1) points; 2) goal difference; 3) number of goals scored.

== Season statistics ==
=== Scoring ===
- Largest winning margin: 6 goals
  - Tersana 0–6 Al-Ahly (22 October 2000)
- Highest scoring game: 7 goals
  - Sohag Railways 3–4 Al-Ahly (28 April 2001)
- Most goals scored in a match by a single team: 6 goals
  - Tersana 0–6 Al-Ahly (22 October 2000)
- Most goals scored in a match by a losing team: 3 goals
  - Sohag Railways 3–4 Al-Ahly (28 April 2001)

==== Top scorers ====
Rank	Player	Club	Goals
1	Tarek El-Said	Zamalek SC	13
2	Mohannad El-Boushi	Tersana	11
3	Walid Salah Abdel-Latif	Zamalek SC	10
4	Nabil Abouzaid	Goldi Maaden	9
5	Ashraf Mamdouh	Goldi Maaden	8
5	Mohamed Barakat	Ismaily	8

==== Hat-tricks ====
Player	For	Against	Result	Date
Mohannad El-Boushi	Tersana	Ismaily	3–3	27 September 2000
Ashraf Mamdouh	Goldi Maaden	Ismaily	4–1	19 October 2000
Sayed Abdel Hafiz	Al-Ahli	Tersana	6–0	22 October 2000
Yasser Mohamed	Al Masry	El Koroum	3–1	27 October 2000
Mohamed Mahmoud	Mansoura	Dina Farms	5–1	3 January 2001
Emad Ayoub	Sohag Railway	Al-Ahli	3–4	28 April 2001
