= Mohamed Sebaie =

Egyptian footballer (born 1988)

Personal information
- Date of birth: March 28, 1988 (age 38)
- Position: Left back

Team information
- Current team: Al Nasr

Senior career*
Years	Team	Apps	(Gls)
–2013	El Dakhleya		
2013–	Al Nasr		
- * Club domestic league appearances and goals as of 9 September 2017

Mohamed Sebaie (Arabic: محمد السباعي; born March 28, 1988) is an Egyptian professional footballer who plays as a left back for the Egyptian club Al Nasr.
