= 2005–06 Egyptian Premier League =

Egyptian Premier League
- Season: 2005–06
- Champions: Al Ahly
- Relegated: Asmant Asyut; Al-Aluminium; Koroum
- CAF Champions League: Al Ahly (1st), El Zamalek (2nd)
- CAF Confederation Cup: Ismaily(Cup 2nd), ENNPI (3rd)
- Top goalscorer: Mohamed Aboutrika (Al Ahly) (18 Goals)
- Longest unbeaten run: Al Ahly; 26 matches (all)

In the 2005–06 Egyptian Premier League, Al Ahly were crowned champions for the second year in a row, and for the thirty-first time in total since the league started in 1948. As in the previous campaign, they went undefeated throughout their 26 matches.

== Clubs ==
- Al Ahly
- Al-Aluminium
- Asmant Asyut
- Asmant Suez
- ENPPI
- Ghazl El-Mehalla
- El Geish
- Haras El Hodood
- Al Ismaili
- Al Itthad Al Sakandary
- El-Masry
- Al Mokawloon
- Koroum
- El Zamalek

== Stadiums ==
Stadium	City	Capacity
Borg El Arab	Alexandria	80,000
Cairo Stadium	Cairo	74,100
Osman Ahmed Osman	Cairo	60,000
Military Academy Stadium	Cairo	28,500
Port Said Stadium	Port Said	24,060
Haras el Hodood	Alexandria	22,500
El Mahalla	Mahalla	20,000
Alexandria Stadium	Alexandria	19,676
Ismailia Stadium	Ismaïlia	16,500
Tersana Stadium	Cairo	15,000
Enppi Stadium	Cairo	10,000

== League table ==
Pos	Team	Pld	W	D	L	GF	GA	GD	Pts	Qualification or relegation
1	Al Ahly (C)	26	23	3	0	57	6	+51	72	2007 CAF Champions League
2	Al Zamalek	26	18	4	4	48	22	+26	58	2007 CAF Champions League
3	ENNPI	26	13	7	6	32	18	+14	46	2007 CAF Confederation Cup
4	Ismaily	26	12	3	11	33	32	+1	39	2007 CAF Confederation Cup
5	Haras El Hedood	26	11	5	10	35	25	+10	38	
6	El Geish	26	10	4	12	33	28	+5	34	
7	Al Itthad Al Sakandary	26	8	8	10	19	28	−9	32	
8	Al Masry	26	8	7	11	27	30	−3	31	
9	Al Mokawloon Al Arab	26	8	4	14	26	34	−8	28	
10	Asmant El-Suweis	26	6	10	10	28	45	−17	28	
11	Ghazl El-Mehalla	26	6	9	11	21	34	−13	27	
12	Asmant Asyut	26	6	8	12	26	36	−10	26	Relegation to Egyptian Second Division
13	Al-Aluminium	26	6	7	13	16	40	−24	25	Relegation to Egyptian Second Division
14	Koroum	26	5	5	16	22	41	−19	20	Relegation to Egyptian Second Division

(C) Champions
- Top 2 qualify to CAF African Champions League.
- Egyptian Cup winner & 3rd place qualify to CAF Cup.

== Top goal scorers ==
Pos	Scorer	Team	Goals
1st	Mohamed Aboutrika	Al Ahly	18
2nd	Abdel Halim Ali	El Zamalek	11
3rd	Mohamed Barakat	Al Ahly	9
4th	Amr Zaki	ENPPI	9
5th	Mostafa Gaafar	Al-Zamalek	9
6th	Emad El-Nahhas	Al Ahly	8
7th	Mohamed Fadl	Ismaily	7
8th	Reda Metwally	Asmant Asyut	7
9th	Abdul Hamid Bassiouny	Haras El Hodood	6
10th	Ernest Papa Arko	El Geish	6
