= 2006–07 Egyptian Premier League =

Egyptian Premier League
- Season: 2006–07
- Champions: Al Ahly
- Relegated: Tanta; Petrol Asyut; El-Olympi
- CAF Champions League: Al Ahly (1st), Al Zamalek (2nd)
- CAF Confederation Cup: Haras El Hodood
- Top goalscorer: (Angola) Flávio Amado (Al Ahly) (17 Goals)

The 2006–07 Egyptian Premier League started on 3 August 2006, and the season ended on 25 May 2007. Al Ahly were crowned champions for the third year in a row and for the thirty-second time in total since the league start in 1948.

== Clubs ==
- Al Ahly
- Al-Aluminium
- Asmant Suez
- Baladeyet Al-Mahalla
- ENPPI
- Ghazl Al Mehalla
- Tala'ea El Gaish
- Haras El Hodood
- Al Ismaili
- Al Itthad Al Sakandary
- Al Masry
- Al Mokawloon
- Itesalat
- Petrojet
- Tersana
- Al Zamalek

== Stadiums ==
Borg El Arab Stadium in Alexandria opened recently and it will be the home of majority of the Alexandria clubs. The stadium has a capacity of 80,000. In 2007, Damanhour Stadium in the city of Damanhour will go into construction. Its capacity will be 60,000. In 2009, Mubarak International Stadium will go into construction in Six October City & its capacity will be 65,000. In 2009 the Cairo Military Academy Stadium will be rebuilt and its capacity will be 65,000. As well Ismailia has future plans for expansion or a new venue with a capacity of a minimum of 45,000.

Stadium	City	Capacity
Borg El Arab	Alexandria	80,000
Cairo Stadium	Cairo	74,100
Osman Ahmed Osman	Cairo	60,000
Military Academy Stadium	Cairo	28,500
Port Said Stadium	Port Said	24,060
Haras el Hodood	Alexandria	22,500
El Mahalla	Mahalla	20,000
Alexandria Stadium	Alexandria	19,676
Ismailia Stadium	Ismaïlia	16,500
Tersana Stadium	Cairo	15,000
Enppi Stadium	Cairo	10,000

== Final league table ==
Pos	Team	Pld	W	D	L	GF	GA	GD	Pts	Qualification or relegation
1	Al Ahly (C)	30	23	4	3	64	17	+47	73	CAF Champions League
2	Al Zamalek	30	21	5	4	58	23	+35	68	CAF Champions League
3	Ismaily	30	20	7	3	64	23	+41	67	
4	El-Gaish	30	11	11	8	31	29	+2	44	
5	Haras El Hedood	30	12	8	10	36	39	−3	44	CAF Confederation Cup
6	Ghazl Al Mehalla	30	12	6	12	33	28	+5	42	
7	Petrojet	30	9	13	8	36	39	−3	40	
8	Al Mokawloon Al Arab	30	9	10	11	21	30	−9	37	
9	ENPPI	30	8	11	11	21	26	−5	35	
10	Al Masry	30	9	8	13	23	33	−10	35	
11	Asmant El-Suweis	30	9	6	15	25	39	−14	33	
12	Tersana	30	6	13	11	26	28	−2	31	
13	Al Itthad Al Sakandary	30	7	10	13	27	40	−13	31	
14	Tanta	30	5	11	14	20	37	−17	26	Relegation to 2007–08 Egyptian Second Division
15	Petrol Asyut	30	4	10	16	21	44	−23	22	Relegation to 2007–08 Egyptian Second Division
16	El-Olympi	30	5	7	18	22	53	−31	22	Relegation to 2007–08 Egyptian Second Division

(C) Champions
- Top 2 qualify to CAF African Champions League.
- Egyptian Cup winner & 3rd place qualify to CAF Cup.

== Top goal scorers ==
Pos	Scorer	Team	Goals
1st	Flavio Amado	Al Ahly	17
2nd	Emad Moteab	Al Ahly	16
3rd	Mohamed Fadl	Al-Ismaili	14
4th	Ahmed Hassan Farag	Ghazl Al-Mehalla	12
5th	Abdel Halim Ali	Al-Zamalek	11
