= Mohamed El Baghdadi =

Egyptian footballer (born 1995)

Personal information
- Date of birth: January 1, 1995 (age 31)
- Position: Centre-forward

Team information
- Current team: Al Nasr

Youth career
- Al Ahly

Senior career*
Years	Team	Apps	(Gls)
2015–2017	Aswan	12	(1)
2017–	Al Nasr	1	(0)
- * Club domestic league appearances and goals as of 15 September 2017

Mohamed El Baghdadi (Arabic: محمد البغدادي; born January 1, 1995) is an Egyptian professional footballer who plays as a centre-forward for the Egyptian club Al Nasr. He began his career in youth level in Al Ahly. He was a part of Aswan SC from August 2015 to August 2017. He joined Al Nasr in September 2017.
