= 2009–10 Egyptian Second Division =

Sports competition

Egyptian Second Division
- Season: 2009–10
- Promoted: Misr El-Maqasha (Group A); Wadi Degla (Group B); Smouha (Group C)
- Relegated: Group A: Shouban Qenah; Wadi El Gedid FC; Madina Monowara; Group B: Banha FC; Gomhoreyat Shepin FC; Al-Sekka Al-Hadid; Group C: Kafr Al-Sheikh; Al-Zarqa FC; Senbalawin FC

The 2009–10 Egyptian Second Division was the 2009–10 season of the Egyptian Second Division competition. A total of 48 teams are divided into 3 groups based on geographical distribution. The top team of each group promotes to the highest Egyptian football level (Egyptian Premier League), The Season started on Wednesday 23 September 2009 and ended on Wednesday 12 May 2010. This season witnessed the promotion of three teams that will play in the Premier League for their first time ever.

On 28 April 2010, Smouha became the first team to secure a promotion seat to the 2010–11 Egyptian Premier League. Smouha earned promotion in style after an incredible 7-1 win against Abu Qair Semad. A week later, Misr El-Maqasha followed Smouha to the Premier league. It earned promotion after a 2-0 win against Wadi El Gedid FC at home ground. It was Wadi Degla that sealed the third promotion seat. Wadi Degla defeated Al-Sekka Al-Hadid 3-1 in the last week of the competition.

On the other hand, Al-Sekka Al-Hadid, the oldest club in the Middle East, failed to avoid relegation to the Egyptian Third Division.

== Relegated from 2008–09 Egyptian Premier Division ==
- Itesalat 14th
  Joined Group B
- Tersana 15th
  Joined Group B
- Al-Olympi 16th
  Joined Group C

== Promoted from 2008–09 Egyptian Third Division ==
Group A
- Al Wosta FC
- Wadi El Gedid FC
- Madina Monowara

Group B
- Wadi Degla Sporting Club
- Sharquia FC
- Al Mareekh FC
- Banha FC

Group C
- Al Rajaa FC
- Samanoud FC

Tanta FC was playing in Group B in 2008–09 Second Division, but in Group C 2009–10 Second Division, that's why we have 4 teams promoted to Group B and 2 teams promoted to Group C in 2009–10 Season.

== Promoted and relegated after 2009–10 Egyptian Second Division ==
=== Promoted to 2010–11 Egyptian Premier League ===
- Misr El-Maqasha won the Egyptian Second Division (Group A)
- Wadi Degla won the Egyptian Second Division (Group B)
- Smouha won the Egyptian Second Division (Group C)

=== Relegated to 2010–11 Egyptian Third Division ===
Group A
- Shouban Qenah
- Wadi El Gedid FC
- Madina Monowara

Group B
- Banha FC
- Gomhoreyat Shepin FC
- Al-Sekka Al-Hadid

Group C
- Kafr Al-Sheikh
- Al-Zarqa FC
- Senbalawin FC

== League tables ==
=== Group A ===
Pos	Team	Pld	W	D	L	GF	GA	GD	Pts	Promotion or relegation
1	Misr El-Maqasha (C)	30	19	8	3	56	28	+28	65	Promoted to 2010–11 Egyptian Premier League
2	Telephonat Bani Sweif	30	17	9	4	48	16	+32	60	
3	Grand Hotel FC	30	16	9	5	49	30	+19	57	
4	Aswan FC	30	16	8	6	50	25	+25	56	
5	El Minya FC	30	14	9	7	36	25	+11	51	
6	Markaz Shabab Ebshouay	30	13	6	11	36	37	−1	45	
7	Sohag FC	30	11	9	10	38	35	+3	42	
8	Shabab El Waladeya FC	30	9	9	12	38	45	−7	36	
9	Aluminium Nag Hammâdi	30	8	11	11	30	35	−5	35	
10	Fayoum FC	30	7	12	11	27	30	−3	33	
11	Sokar El Hawamdia FC	30	8	9	13	28	36	−8	33	
12	Abu Qirqas FC	30	9	5	16	38	50	−12	32	
13	Al Wosta FC	30	7	9	14	22	41	−19	30	
14	Shouban Qenah (R)	30	6	11	13	30	48	−18	29	Relegation to 2010–11 Egyptian Third Division
15	Wadi El Gedid FC (R)	30	7	5	18	32	51	−19	26	Relegation to 2010–11 Egyptian Third Division
16	Madina Monowara (R)	30	6	5	19	31	57	−26	23	Relegation to 2010–11 Egyptian Third Division

Source: rsssf.com
(C) Champions; (R) Relegated

=== Group B ===
Pos	Team	Pld	W	D	L	GF	GA	GD	Pts	Promotion or relegation
1	Wadi Degla (C)	30	17	12	1	44	14	+30	63	Promotion to 2010–11 Egyptian Premier League
2	Gasco	30	15	13	2	44	19	+25	58	
3	El Dakhleya FC	30	16	10	4	40	18	+22	58	
4	Itesalat	30	15	10	5	42	24	+18	55	
5	Al Nasr (Egypt)	30	10	12	8	40	37	+3	42	
6	Sharkia SC	30	10	11	9	25	32	−7	41	
7	Tersana	30	10	9	11	26	30	−4	39	
8	Al Rebat We Al Anwar	30	9	9	12	25	31	−6	36	
9	Olympic El Qanal FC	30	6	15	9	33	32	+1	33	
10	El Shams	30	7	12	11	22	29	−7	33	
11	Montakhab El-Suez FC	30	7	11	12	22	27	−5	32	
12	Al Mareekh FC	30	6	14	10	23	33	−10	32	
13	Suez Cement	30	7	8	15	24	35	−11	29 (Note: Since Banha FC, Suez Cement, and Gomhoreyat Shepin FC earned the same number of points (29 points), the three teams were ranked according to the results of only the matches played among them (see relegation classification))	
14	Banha FC (R)	30	8	5	17	32	50	−18	29	Relegation to 2010–11 Egyptian Third Division
15	Gomhoreyat Shepin FC (R)	30	6	11	13	28	37	−9	29	Relegation to 2010–11 Egyptian Third Division
16	Al-Sekka Al-Hadid (R)	30	3	14	13	30	51	−21	23	Relegation to 2010–11 Egyptian Third Division

(C) Champions; (R) Relegated
Notes:

Relegation classification
Pos	Team	Pld	W	D	L	GF	GA	GD	Pts
1	Suez Cement	4	2	1	1	5	3	+2	7
2	Banha FC	4	2	1	1	6	5	+1	7
3	Gomhoreyat Shepin FC	4	0	2	2	3	6	−3	2

Source: rsssf.com

Gomhoreyat Shepin, the team with the fewest points among the three, relegated directly to Third Division, while a play-off match was scheduled to be played on May 19 at Sekka El Hadeed Stadium in Cairo between Banha and Suez Cement. The match ended in a 1-0 victory for Suez Cement, so Banha joined both Gomhoreyat Shepin and Al-Sekka Al-Hadid to the Third Division.

=== Group C ===
Pos	Team	Pld	W	D	L	GF	GA	GD	Pts	Promotion or relegation
1	Smouha (C)	30	19	8	3	60	25	+35	65	Promotion to 2010–11 Egyptian Premier League
2	Koroum	30	13	14	3	43	19	+24	53	
3	Baladeyet El-Mahalla	30	15	6	9	38	32	+6	51	
4	Al-Olympi	30	14	8	8	40	28	+12	50	
5	Ala'ab Damanhour	30	12	9	9	37	35	+2	45	
6	Tanta FC	30	9	13	8	31	25	+6	40	
7	Al-Hammam	30	9	12	9	27	29	−2	39	
8	Abu Qair Semad	30	9	10	11	38	40	−2	37	
9	Nabarouh	30	9	9	12	38	45	−7	36	
10	Samanoud FC	30	8	11	11	32	38	−6	35	
11	Al Rajaa FC	30	7	14	9	28	36	−8	35	
12	Meiah Al-Beheira	30	7	13	10	24	32	−8	34	
13	Maleyeit Kafr El-Zayat	30	5	18	7	29	32	−3	33	
14	Kafr Al-Sheikh (R)	30	8	7	15	31	43	−12	31	Relegation to 2010–11 Egyptian Third Division
15	Al-Zarqa FC (R)	30	5	14	11	31	43	−12	29	Relegation to 2010–11 Egyptian Third Division
16	Senbalawin FC (R)	30	3	10	17	23	48	−25	19	Relegation to 2010–11 Egyptian Third Division

(C) Champions; (R) Relegated
- Top 3 teams qualify for the 2010–11 Egyptian Premier League.
- Bottom 3 teams from each group are relegated to the Egyptian Third Division for the 2010–11 season.

== Results ==
=== Group A ===
Home \ Away	MMK	GHT	TBS	ASW	MIN	SOH	EBS	ALM	WAL	ABU	FYM	SKH	SHQ	WST	WGD	MDM
Misr Lel Makkasa		1–1	0–0	2–2	2–0	3–2	4–2	3–1	3–0	4–2	1–0	1–4	5–0	2–1	2–0	2–0
Grand Hotel	2–3		1–1	2–1	2–0	2–2	2–0	0–0	3–2	1–0	2–0	2–1	2–1	3–1	1–2	3–1
Telephonat Beni Suef	1–2	0–1		2–0	0–1	2–0	0–0	3–0	3–0	3–2	2–0	3–1	0–0	5–0	1–0	2–0
Aswan	0–0	1–1	1–2		1–1	2–0	4–0	1–0	3–0	3–0	1–0	5–1	5–1	1–0	2–2	2–0
El Minya	0–0	3–2	0–1	0–1		1–0	1–1	2–2	3–0	1–0	1–1	0–0	4–0	0–0	3–1	1–2
Sohag	1–4	0–1	1–0	1–1	2–1		1–1	4–1	2–0	2–2	1–1	1–0	1–2	2–0	1–0	3–0
Ebshouay	2–3	1–2	0–2	1–0	0–1	1–0		2–1	3–0	3–1	2–1	2–1	3–2	0–1	2–1	2–0
Aluminium	0–1	2–2	0–0	2–1	0–1	2–1	1–0		0–0	1–1	2–1	0–1	1–1	2–0	0–1	2–0
Al Walideya	2–2	2–1	2–2	3–1	1–0	1–1	3–0	1–1		1–1	0–1	3–1	0–0	3–1	6–3	3–1
Abu Qirqas FC	1–2	0–4	0–2	2–3	0–1	2–2	2–1	0–1	1–2		2–0	0–0	1–0	4–0	2–1	1–0
Fayoum	0–0	0–0	1–1	0–1	1–1	0–1	1–1	2–1	1–0	3–2		0–0	1–1	0–1	4–0	2–1
Sokar El Hawamdia	0–1	1–0	0–0	0–0	0–1	1–1	0–1	1–1	1–1	3–5	2–1		1–0	1–1	2–0	2–1
Shouban Qenah	1–1	1–1	1–1	0–1	2–3	0–1	1–1	1–0	2–0	3–1	0–2	0–1		1–0	1–1	2–0
Al Wosta	2–1	0–1	0–2	1–1	1–1	2–1	0–0	0–2	1–1	2–0	0–0	1–0	1–1		1–1	2–0
Wadi El Gedid	0–1	1–2	0–2	1–2	1–2	0–1	1–3	2–2	2–1	0–1	2–2	1–0	5–1	2–1		1–0
Al Madina Al Monawara	1–0	2–2	2–5	1–2	1–3	2–2	0–1	2–2	1–0	1–2	1–1	3–2	4–4	3–1	2–0	

Updated to match(es) played on 12 May 2010. Source: http://www.goalzz.com/main.aspx?c=5256
Legend: Blue = home team win; Yellow = draw; Red = away team win.

=== Group B ===
Home \ Away	WDG	ITS	DKH	GAS	NAS	TER	R&A	SHR	QAN	SHM	MSZ	MER	GSP	SZC	SHD	BAN
Wadi Degla SC		0–0	0–1	0–0	2–0	3–0	1–0	4–0	1–1	0–0	2–1	1–1	2–2	1–0	1–1	1–0
Itesalat	0–0		2–2	2–2	4–2	1–0	2–1	0–0	2–1	1–0	1–0	3–1	1–1	1–1	5–2	6–1
El Dakhleya SC	1–2	0–1		1–0	1–1	2–0	2–0	2–0	1–1	1–0	3–0	3–1	0–1	1–0	3–1	1–0
Gasco	0–0	1–0	1–1		2–0	1–0	0–0	2–0	2–2	2–1	1–0	1–1	2–1	2–0	2–0	2–2
Al Nasr Egypt	0–3	2–0	1–1	1–1		4–1	3–0	0–1	3–3	4–1	0–2	1–0	0–2	2–2	1–1	1–0
Tersana	0–0	0–1	0–0	0–0	1–1		1–1	2–1	1–0	1–3	0–0	1–0	1–0	1–0	4–0	2–1
Al-Rebat We Al-Anwar	1–1	0–3	1–0	0–1	2–0	2–3		0–0	1–0	2–1	0–0	0–0	1–0	1–0	1–1	3–2
Sharquia FC	1–4	1–0	0–0	0–0	1–1	0–0	2–0		0–0	1–0	3–0	1–0	3–0	2–1	0–0	2–1
Olympic El Qanah FC	1–2	1–0	2–2	1–1	1–1	1–2	2–0	3–0		0–0	1–1	1–1	3–1	1–0	1–1	1–2
El Shams Club	0–1	0–1	1–1	1–0	1–1	1–0	0–0	1–1	1–0		0–0	1–1	0–2	2–0	1–0	0–3
Montakhab El-Suez FC	0–1	2–0	0–2	1–2	1–2	0–1	1–0	4–0	0–0	1–1		0–0	0–0	1–1	4–3	0–2
Al Mareekh FC	1–2	0–0	1–1	0–5	0–0	1–0	1–0	1–1	0–2	2–2	1–0		2–1	0–0	3–0	0–0
Gomhoreyat Shepin FC	0–0	1–1	1–2	1–2	1–3	2–1	0–3	5–1	0–0	0–0	0–1	2–0		1–1	1–1	1–3
Suez Cement (Asmant el-Suweis)	0–1	1–1	0–1	0–3	0–1	2–1	3–2	1–1	3–1	0–1	0–0	2–1	2–0		3–2	1–0
Al-Sekka Al-Hadid	1–3	0–1	0–2	3–3	2–2	1–1	0–0	1–0	1–1	2–2	0–2	1–1	0–0	1–0		1–0
Banha FC	1–5	1–2	0–2	0–3	0–2	1–1	1–3	0–2	2–1	1–0	0–0	1–2	1–1	2–1	4–3	

Updated to match(es) played on 12 May 2010. Source: http://www.goalzz.com/main.aspx?c=5256
Legend: Blue = home team win; Yellow = draw; Red = away team win.

=== Group C ===
Home \ Away	DMN	OLY	HMM	ZAR	AQS	BMH	KSH	KOR	MKZ	BWC	ITN	RAJ	SAM	SEN	SMO	TNT
Ala'ab Damanhour		0–0	0–1	0–1	1–1	2–0	3–0	2–1	0–0	1–1	4–1	2–1	3–1	3–1	0–1	1–0
Olympi	3–3		3–0	2–1	1–3	0–1	2–0	1–0	1–1	0–0	3–0	1–2	2–1	2–0	1–3	1–1
Al-Hammam	2–2	0–1		2–0	1–1	2–0	1–1	1–1	1–1	1–0	2–1	2–2	2–1	2–0	2–3	1–0
Al-Zarqa	1–2	1–3	0–0		0–5	1–2	1–2	1–1	1–1	3–0	2–2	1–1	3–2	1–1	2–2	1–1
Abu Qair Semad	1–2	0–2	1–0	3–0		1–1	2–1	1–3	0–0	0–2	3–1	0–1	2–1	1–1	0–1	0–1
Baladeyet El-Mahalla	0–2	1–4	0–0	1–0	1–1		2–0	2–0	2–1	2–1	1–0	3–1	1–1	3–2	0–1	1–1
Kafr Al-Sheikh	0–1	1–1	0–0	1–1	1–2	1–2		1–1	2–0	2–1	0–1	5–0	0–3	3–1	2–1	2–0
Koroum	2–0	4–0	3–0	0–0	1–1	1–0	4–1		0–0	3–1	2–1	2–0	2–0	0–0	1–1	1–0
Maleyeit Kafr El-Zayat	3–0	0–0	0–0	0–0	2–1	1–3	1–1	3–3		3–0	1–2	1–1	0–0	0–0	2–4	0–0
Meiah Al-Beheira	1–1	0–1	1–0	0–0	0–0	1–1	1–0	0–0	0–0		0–0	1–0	2–2	3–0	0–1	2–2
Nabarouh	2–0	1–1	1–2	1–3	3–1	0–2	1–0	1–1	2–1	1–2		2–2	3–3	2–2	1–0	0–1
Al Rajaa FC	0–0	1–0	1–1	1–1	1–1	0–1	2–2	0–0	0–0	2–1	1–3		0–0	2–0	1–1	0–0
Samanoud FC	0–0	1–0	2–1	2–1	2–2	2–1	2–0	0–2	1–2	0–1	2–2	1–0		1–0	0–0	0–0
Senbalawin FC	2–1	0–2	1–0	1–2	0–2	2–1	0–1	1–1	1–2	1–1	1–2	2–3	1–1		2–2	0–2
Smouha Sporting Club	5–0	1–0	2–0	1–1	7–1	2–1	1–0	0–3	4–1	1–5	2–1	2–0	4–0	0–0		3–2
Tanta SC	3–1	1–2	0–0	3–1	2–1	1–2	5–1	0–0	2–2	0–0	0–0	0–2	1–0	2–0	0–0	

Updated to match(es) played on 12 May 2010. Source: http://www.goalzz.com/main.aspx?c=5256
Legend: Blue = home team win; Yellow = draw; Red = away team win.
