= 2007–08 Egyptian Premier League =

Egyptian Premier League
- Season: 2007–08
- Champions: Al Ahly
- Relegated: Aluminium; Baladiyyat Al-Mehalla; Suez Cement
- CAF Champions League: Al Ahly (1st)
- CAF Confederation Cup: Haras El Hodood; ENPPI
- Top goalscorer: (Egypt) Alaa Ibrahim (Petrojet) 15 goals

The 2007–08 Egyptian Premier League started on 13 August 2007, and finished on 22 May 2008. Al Ahly were crowned champions for the fourth year in a row and for the thirty-third time in total since the league started in 1948.

== League table ==
Pos	Team	Pld	W	D	L	GF	GA	GD	Pts	Qualification or relegation
1	Al Ahly (C)	30	21	7	2	47	22	+25	70	2009 CAF Champions League
2	Ismaily	30	14	11	5	47	27	+20	53	
3	Zamalek	30	16	5	9	45	30	+15	53	
4	El Geish	30	14	9	7	33	22	+11	51	
5	Petrojet	30	13	7	10	51	38	+13	46	
6	Haras El Hodood	30	11	13	6	38	26	+12	46	2009 CAF Confederation Cup
7	ENPPI	30	12	10	8	42	33	+9	46	2009 CAF Confederation Cup
8	Ghazl Al-Mehalla	30	12	7	11	45	37	+8	43	
9	Al Masry	30	7	13	10	29	32	−3	34	
10	Al Ittihad	30	7	12	11	32	39	−7	33	
11	Tersana	30	8	8	14	30	40	−10	32	
12	Al Moqawloon Al Arab	30	6	13	11	34	38	−4	31	
13	Itesalat	30	8	7	15	25	46	−21	31	
14	Aluminium	30	7	9	14	29	50	−21	30	Relegation to 2008–09 Egyptian Second Division
15	Baladiyyat Al-Mehalla	30	5	10	15	23	40	−17	25	Relegation to 2008–09 Egyptian Second Division
16	Suez Cement	30	5	7	18	27	57	−30	22	Relegation to 2008–09 Egyptian Second Division

Source: FIFA.com
(C) Champions
- Top 2 qualify to CAF African Champions League.
- Egyptian Cup winner & 3rd place qualify to CAF Cup.

== Top goal scorers ==
Pos	Scorer	Team	Goals
1st	Alaa Ibrahim	Petrojet	15
2nd	Ahmed Hassan Farag	Ghazl El-Mehalla	12
3rd	Mohamed Fadl	Ismaily	10
4th	Mostafa Karim	Ismaily	9
5th	Ramy Rabie	Al Moqawloon Al Arab	9

== See also ==
- List of football clubs in Egypt
