= 2008–09 Egyptian Second Division =

Egyptian Second Division
- Season: 2008–09
- Promoted: El Gouna (Group A); El-Entag El-Harby (Group B); Mansoura (Group C)
- Relegated: (Group A); Bani Suweif FC; Quos FC; El Badri FC (Group B); Ghazl El Suez FC; Misr Insurance FC; Mnouf FC (Group C); Domiat Club; El Henawy FC; Talkha Electricity FC

The 2008–09 Egyptian Second Division was the 2008–09 season of the Egyptian Second Division competition. A total of 48 teams are divided into 3 groups based on geographical distribution. The top team of each group promotes to the highest Egyptian football level; Egyptian Premier League.

== Teams Promoted and Relegated before 2008-09 Egyptian Second Division ==
=== Teams Relegated from 2007-08 Egyptian Premier Division ===
14th (Group A)

- Baladeyet El-Mahalla 15th (Group C)
- Suez Cement 16th (Group B)

== Teams Promoted and Relegated after 2008-09 Egyptian Second Division ==
=== Teams Promoted to 2009-10 Egyptian Premier League ===
- El Gouna FC won the Egyptian Second Division 2008-09 (Group A)
- El-Entag El-Harby won the Egyptian Second Division 2008-09 (Group B)
- El Mansoura SC won the Egyptian Second Division 2008-09 (Group C)

=== Teams Relegated to 2009-10 Egyptian Third Division ===
Group A

- Bani Suweif FC
- Quos FC
- El Badri FC

Group B

- Ghazl El Suez FC
- Misr Insurance FC
- Mnouf FC

Group C

- Domiat Club
- El Henawy FC
- Talkha Electricity FC

== League tables ==
=== Group A ===
Pos	Team	Pld	W	D	L	GF	GA	GD	Pts	Promotion or relegation
1	El Gouna FC (C)	30	18	10	2	54	17	+37	64	Promoted to 2009–10 Egyptian Premier League
2	Misr El-Maqasha	30	17	10	3	58	27	+31	61	
3	Aluminium Nag Hammâdi	29	15	10	4	51	27	+24	55	
4	Telephonaat Bani Suweif FC	29	14	11	4	43	24	+19	53	
5	El Minya FC	29	10	14	5	36	24	+12	44	
6	Abu Qirqas FC	29	13	4	12	42	33	+9	43	
7	Sohag FC	29	12	5	12	52	41	+11	41	
8	Grand Hotel FC	29	9	10	10	29	32	−3	37	
9	Shouban Qenah	29	10	7	12	27	42	−15	37	
10	Fayoum FC	29	10	6	13	35	39	−4	36	
11	Aswan FC	29	9	9	11	26	30	−4	36	
12	Shabab El Waladeya FC	29	9	9	11	32	38	−6	36	
13	Markaz Shabab Ebshouay	29	8	10	11	32	33	−1	34	
14	Bani Sweif FC (R)	29	7	9	13	26	38	−12	30	Relegation to 2009–10 Egyptian Third Division
15	Quos FC (R)	29	4	7	18	26	58	−32	19	Relegation to 2009–10 Egyptian Third Division
16	El Badri FC (R)	29	1	3	25	9	75	−66	6	Relegation to 2009–10 Egyptian Third Division

Source: rsssf.com and goalzz.com
(C) Champions; (R) Relegated
- Top 3 teams qualify for the 2009–10 Egyptian Premier League.
- Bottom 3 teams are relegated to the Egyptian Third Division for the 2009–10 season.

=== Group B ===
Pos	Team	Pld	W	D	L	GF	GA	GD	Pts	Promotion or relegation
1	El-Entag El-Harby (C)	30	15	12	3	44	24	+20	57	Promoted to 2009–10 Egyptian Premier League
2	Al Nasr Egypt	30	15	10	5	50	32	+18	55	
3	El Dakhleya FC	30	15	8	7	47	29	+18	53	
4	El Shams Club	30	13	10	7	30	24	+6	49	
5	Tanta FC	30	13	9	8	38	29	+9	48	
6	Suez Cement	29	12	9	8	48	35	+13	45	
7	Olympic El Qanal FC	30	11	12	7	33	27	+6	45	
8	Gasco	30	8	16	6	28	24	+4	40	
9	Sokar El Hawamdia FC	30	9	11	10	33	40	−7	38	
10	Gomhoreyat Shepin FC	30	8	10	12	31	42	−11	34	
11	Montakhab El-Suez FC	30	7	11	12	29	38	−9	32	
12	Al Rebat We Al Anwar	30	7	11	12	26	41	−15	32	
13	Al-Sekka Al-Hadid	30	6	12	12	30	38	−8	30	
14	Ghazl El Suez FC (R)	30	6	11	13	36	44	−8	29	Relegation to 2009–10 Egyptian Third Division
15	Misr Insurance FC (R)	30	6	9	15	22	31	−9	27	Relegation to 2009–10 Egyptian Third Division
16	Mnouf FC (R)	30	5	7	18	21	44	−23	22	Relegation to 2009–10 Egyptian Third Division

Source: rsssf.com and goalzz.com
(C) Champions; (R) Relegated
- Top 3 teams qualify for the 2009–10 Egyptian Premier League.
- Bottom 3 teams are relegated to the Egyptian Third Division for the 2009–10 season.

=== Group C ===
Pos	Team	Pld	W	D	L	GF	GA	GD	Pts	Promotion or relegation
1	Mansoura (C)	30	22	4	4	47	16	+31	70	Promoted to 2009–10 Egyptian Premier League
2	Smouha Sporting Club	30	20	7	3	50	22	+28	67	
3	Maleyeit Kafr El-Zayat	30	17	7	6	53	30	+23	58	
4	Baladeyet El-Mahalla	30	15	9	6	51	28	+23	54	
5	Abu Qair Semad	30	15	7	8	50	27	+23	52	
6	Nabarouh	30	13	9	8	44	37	+7	48	
7	Koroum	30	12	10	8	58	39	+19	46	
8	Ala'ab Damanhour	30	11	10	9	40	29	+11	43	
9	Meiah Al-Beheira	30	7	12	11	32	38	−6	33	
10	Kafr Al-Sheikh	30	8	9	13	26	48	−22	33	
11	Al-Zarqa FC	30	5	16	9	24	31	−7	31	
12	Senbalawin FC	30	7	8	15	29	53	−24	29	
13	Al-Hammam	30	6	9	15	22	36	−14	27	
14	Domiat Club (R)	30	5	11	14	35	49	−14	26	Relegation to 2009–10 Egyptian Third Division
15	El Henawy FC (R)	30	4	8	18	21	49	−28	20	Relegation to 2009–10 Egyptian Third Division
16	Talkha Electricity FC (R)	30	3	4	23	19	69	−50	13	Relegation to 2009–10 Egyptian Third Division

Source: rsssf.com and goalzz.com
(C) Champions; (R) Relegated
- Top 3 teams qualify for the 2009–10 Egyptian Premier League.
- Bottom 3 teams are relegated to the Egyptian Third Division for the 2009–10 season.
