= Petrojet SC =

Association football club in Suez, Egypt

Petrojet
- Full name: Petrojet Football Club
- Nicknames: The Jets; Blaugrana
- Short name: PET
- Founded: 2000; 26 years ago
- Ground: Suez Stadium
- Capacity: 27,000
- Chairman: Ibrahim Ramadan Ibrahim
- Manager: Yasser Bahaa El Din
- League: Egyptian Premier League
Home colours	Away colours

Petrojet Sporting Club (Arabic: نادي بتروجيت الرياضي) is an Egyptian sports club based in Suez. The club is related to Petrojet, a construction company that specializes in oil, gas and petrochemical industries.

Petrojet was promoted to the Egyptian Premier League for the first time in their history only six years after their foundation, as they were promoted from the Egyptian Second Division during the 2005–06 season.

In 2026, Suez SC merged its football operations with those of Petrojet SC to establish a new football club, Montakhab El Suez Petrojet SC. The merger followed the establishment of Montakhab El Suez Petrojet Football Company, in which Petrojet SC holds a 51% stake and Suez SC holds the remaining 49%. The merger is limited exclusively to football operations, with both clubs retaining their independence in all other sporting activities.

== History ==
=== Petrojet's history in The Egyptian Premier League ===
Season	G	W	D	L	GF	GA	GD	Pts	Position
2006–07	30	9	13	8	36	39	−3	40	7th
2007–08	30	13	7	10	51	38	13	46	5th
2008–09	30	13	12	5	47	38	9	51	3rd
2009–10	30	13	8	9	42	37	5	47	4th
2010–11	10	4	3	3	10	10	0	15	6th
Egyptian Premier League	130	52	43	35	186	162	24	199	

== Stadium ==
Petrojet formerly played their home games at Cairo International Stadium. They now play in Suez Stadium.

== Technical staff ==
Position	Staff
Technical director	Ibrahim Mohamed
Head coach	Yasser Bahaa El Din
Assistant coach	Yehia Ismail
Goalkeeper coach	Mohamed Maher

== Current squad ==
As of August 2026

Note: Flags indicate national team as defined under FIFA eligibility rules; some limited exceptions apply. Players may hold more than one non-FIFA nationality.

No.	Pos.	Nation	Player
1	GK	EGY	Omar Salah
2	DF	EGY	Ahmed Ghoneim
3	DF	EGY	Islam Abdallah
4	DF	EGY	Mahmoud Shedid Kenawi
5	DF	MAR	Youssef Limouri
7	MF	EGY	Ammar Hamdy (on loan from ZED)
8	MF	EGY	Mohamed Ali Okasha (captain)
9	FW	PLE	Bader Mousa
10	FW	NGR	Gabriel Chukwudi
11	MF	EGY	Mohamed Dodo
13	MF	GUI	Amadou Bah
14	MF	EGY	Mostafa El Gamal
15	DF	EGY	Ahmed Bahbah
16	GK	EGY	Abdelkafi Ragab

No.	Pos.	Nation	Player
17	MF	EGY	Adham Hamed
18	DF	EGY	Tawfik Mohamed
19	MF	EGY	Mostafa El Badry
20	FW	NGR	Rasheed Ahmed (on loan from ZED)
22	FW	EGY	Mahmoud Morsi
23	DF	RSA	Qobolwakhe Sibande
25	DF	EGY	Barakat Haggag
29	DF	EGY	Ahmed Yassin
30	MF	EGY	Omar Reda
39	MF	CIV	Abdoulaye Diabaté
40	FW	SEN	Sekou Sonko
77	GK	EGY	Mohamed Khalifa
99	FW	EGY	Samir Mohamed (on loan from Al Ahly)

== Performance in Egyptian competitions ==
- Egyptian Premier League: 5 appearances

2006–07 – Seventh Place
2007–08 – Fifth Place
2008–09 – Third Place
2009–10 – Fourth Place
2010–11 – Tenth Place

- Egyptian Cup: 7 appearances

2002–03 – Round of 32
2004–05 – Round of 16
2006–07 – Round of 16
2007–08 – Quarter-finals
2008–09 – Semi-finals
2009–10 – Quarter-finals
2010–11 – Quarter-finals

== Performance in CAF competitions ==
- PR = Preliminary round
- FR = First round
- SR = Second round

Season	Competition	Round	Country	Club	Home	Away	Aggregate
2010	CAF Confederation Cup	PR	Zanzibar	Miembeni	2–0	2–2	4–2
2010	CAF Confederation Cup	FR	Sudan	Al Khartoum-3	3–0	2–1	5–1
2010	CAF Confederation Cup	SR	Tunisia	CS Sfaxien	1–1	0–1	1–2
2015	CAF Confederation Cup	PR	South Sudan	Al Ghazal	6–1	1–0	7–1
2015	CAF Confederation Cup	FR	Mali	Djoliba	0–0	1–2	1–2

== Individual honours ==
Top Goal Scorer

- 2007–08 : (Egypt) Alaa Ibrahim – 15 goals

== Managerial history ==
- (Egypt) Fathi Mabrouk (2004–05)
- (Egypt) Mokhtar Mokhtar (July 1, 2005–May 31, 2010)
- (Egypt) Helmy Toulan (June 8, 2010–May 26, 2011)
- (Egypt) Mohamed Omar (May 26–July 12, 2011)
- (Egypt) Taha Basry (July 19, 2011–May 16, 2012)
- (Egypt) Ramadan El Sayed (May 21, 2012–May 2, 2013)
- (Egypt) Mokhtar Mokhtar (2013–2015)
- (Egypt) Ahmed Hassan (2015–2015)
- (Egypt) Hassan Shehata (2015–2016)
