= 2010–11 Egyptian Premier League =

Egyptian Premier League
- Season: 2010–11
- Dates: 5 August 2010 – 11 July 2011
- Champions: Al Ahly
- 2012 CAF Champions League: Al-Ahly; Zamalek SC
- 2012 CAF Confederation Cup: ENPPI (cup winner)
- Matches: 240
- Goals: 571 (2.38 per match)
- Top goalscorer: Ahmed Abd El-Zaher Shikabala (13 goals)
- Biggest home win: Ismaily 5–0 El-Entag El-Harby
- Biggest away win: Wadi Degla 0–5 Haras El Hodood
- Highest scoring: El-Ittihad 3–6 El-Entag El-Harby
- Average attendance: 6,732

The 2010–11 Egyptian Premier League was the fifty-fourth season of the Egyptian Premier League since its establishment in 1948. It began on 5 August 2010 and ended on 11 July 2011. The league was suspended on 27 January 2011 due to the Egyptian Revolution and resumed on 13 April 2011. A total of 16 teams are contesting the league including six-time defending champions Al-Ahly S.C. who have won thirty-five times in total.

== Teams ==
Ghazl El-Mehalla, El Mansoura SC and Asyut Petroleum as the worst three teams of the 2009–10 were relegated to the 2010–11 Egyptian Second Division. They were replaced by the three 2009–10 Egyptian Second Division champions, Wadi Degla, Smouha and Misr El-Maqasha.

=== Stadiums and locations ===
2010–11 Egyptian Premier League teams
Cairo and Giza 2010–11 Egyptian Premier League teams

Club	Location	Venue	Seating Capacity
Al-Ahly	Cairo	Cairo International Stadium	74,100
ENPPI	Cairo	Petro Sport Stadium	25,000
El-Entag El-Harby	Cairo	Al-Salam Stadium	30,000
El Geish	Cairo	Gehaz El Reyada Stadium	22,000
Gouna	Hurghada	El Gouna Stadium	30,000
Haras El Hodood	Alexandria	Haras El Hodood Stadium	22,000
Ismaily	Ismailia	Ismailia Stadium	18,525
Al-Ittihad Al-Sakndary	Alexandria	Alexandria Stadium	13,660
Al-Masry	Port Said	Port Said Stadium	17,988
Misr El Makasa	Fayoum	Fayoum Stadium	10,000
Al-Mokawloon Al-Arab	Cairo	Osman Ahmed Osman Stadium	35,000
Petrojet	Suez	Suez Stadium	25,000
El Shorta	Cairo	Police Academy Stadium	22,000
Smouha	Alexandria	Alexandria Stadium	13,660
Wadi Degla	Cairo	Cairo Military Academy Stadium	22,000
Zamalek SC	Giza	Cairo International Stadium	74,100

=== Personnel and sponsoring ===
Team	Chairman	Team Coach	Team Captain	Kitmaker	Shirt sponsor
Al-Ahly	(Egypt) Hassan Hamdy	(Portugal) Manuel José	(Egypt) Hossam Ghaly	Adidas	Vodafone Egypt
ENPPI	(Egypt) Tarek Ghanim	(Bulgaria) Stoycho Mladenov	(Egypt) Adel Moustafa	Nike	McDonald's
El-Entag El-Harby	(Egypt) Abdelmonem Hassan	(Egypt) Osama Orabi	(Egypt) Hazem Fathi	Diadora	McDonald's
El Geish	(Egypt) Mostafa Kamel	(Egypt) Farouk Gaafar	(Ghana) Ernest Papa Arko	Diadora	McDonald's
Gouna	(Egypt) Samih Sawiris	(Egypt) Anwar Salama		Umbro	Mobinil
Haras El Hodood	(Egypt) Abdel Rehim Mohamed	(Egypt) Tarek El Ashry	(Egypt) Mohamed Halim	diadora	McDonald's
Ismaily	(Egypt) Nasr Abou El-Hassan	(Egypt) Emad Soliman	(Egypt) Mohamed Homos	BURRDA	
Ittihad	(Egypt) Mohamed Meselhy	(Egypt) Mohamed Amer	(Egypt) Ibrahim El Shayeb	Diadora	McDonald's
Al-Masry	(Egypt) Kamel Abou Aly	(Egypt) Taha Basry	(Egypt) Ahmed Fawzi	Umbro	MTS Egypt
Misr Lel Makasa	(Egypt) Mohammed Abdelsalam	(Egypt) Tarek Yehia	(Egypt) Hassan Kondi	Legea	McDonald's
Mokawloon	(Egypt) Ibrahim Mahlab	(Egypt) Mohamed Radwan	(Egypt) Mohamed El Akabawy	Diadora	McDonald's
Petrojet	(Egypt) Tag El-Din Moharam	(Egypt) Helmi Toulan		Umbro	McDonald's
El Shorta	(Egypt) Mahmoud Sharaf	(Egypt) Talaat Youssef		Nike	McDonald's
Smouha	(Egypt) Mohammad Farag Amer	(Egypt) Hamza El Gamal	(Egypt) Besheer El-Tabei	Diadora	McDonald's
Wadi Degla	(Egypt) Maged Samy	(Belgium) Walter Meeuws	(Egypt) Mohamed Kawarshy	Jako	WADI DEGLA
Zamalek SC	(Egypt) Galal Ibrahim	(Egypt) Hossam Hassan	(Egypt) Abdelwahed El-Sayed	Adidas	Royal Ceramic

== League table ==
Pos	Team	Pld	W	D	L	GF	GA	GD	Pts	Qualification
1	Al-Ahly	30	16	13	1	47	27	+20	61	2012 CAF Champions League
2	Zamalek SC	30	15	11	4	49	32	+17	56	2012 CAF Champions League
3	Ismaily	30	14	7	9	48	33	+15	49	
4	El-Shorta	30	12	11	7	31	23	+8	47	
5	ENPPI	30	13	8	9	37	30	+7	47	2012 CAF Confederation Cup
6	Misr El Makasa	30	10	15	5	41	28	+13	45	
7	Al-Masry	30	10	13	7	28	22	+6	43	
8	Haras El Hodood	30	11	6	13	40	39	+1	39	
9	El Geish	30	8	12	10	25	31	−6	36	
10	Petrojet	30	9	8	13	31	38	−7	35	
11	El Gouna	30	8	10	12	26	33	−7	34	
12	Wadi Degla SC	30	9	6	15	39	49	−10	33	
13	El-Entag El-Harby	30	7	12	11	33	44	−11	33	
14	El-Ittihad	30	7	9	14	36	51	−15	30	
15	Smouha	30	6	10	14	33	45	−12	28	
16	Al Mokawloon	30	5	9	16	27	46	−19	24	

Updated to match(es) played on 11 July 2011. Source:
Rules for classification: 1) points; 2) goal difference; 3) number of goals scored.

== Results ==
Home \ Away	AHL	ENP	ENT	TGS	GOU	HRS	ISM	ITH	MAS	MMK	MOK	PET	ITS	SMO	WDG	ZAM
Al Ahly	—	3–2	2–2	1–0	1–0	2–1	2–1	1–0	1–1	2–2	1–1	2–0	0–0	2–2	1–0	0–0
ENPPI	1–2	—	3–2	1–0	1–0	2–1	0–0	2–0	0–0	1–1	2–1	1–3	0–1	1–1	3–1	3–1
El Entag El Harby	1–2	0–0	—	0–0	1–0	1–4	1–1	2–1	0–0	2–1	1–1	3–2	2–3	1–0	1–1	1–3
Tala'ea El Gaish	0–1	0–2	0–0	—	2–1	1–2	1–0	3–1	1–1	0–0	2–1	1–0	1–0	0–1	2–1	2–2
El Gouna	1–1	2–1	1–0	2–2	—	2–0	2–3	0–2	2–1	2–2	2–1	1–0	0–0	1–0	0–2	2–1
Haras El Hodoud	0–3	2–3	1–1	1–1	3–1	—	2–0	0–2	1–0	0–1	1–1	3–1	1–0	1–0	1–0	2–2
Ismaily	3–1	2–1	5–0	3–0	2–1	3–2	—	2–0	0–0	1–1	0–1	1–1	4–1	3–2	1–0	0–0
Al Ittihad	2–2	1–0	3–6	0–1	0–0	2–1	1–3	—	3–1	1–1	3–2	2–3	0–0	0–3	0–2	1–1
Al Masry	0–0	1–0	1–0	2–1	1–1	1–0	2–0	2–2	—	1–0	0–0	0–0	0–0	1–3	2–0	2–0
Misr Lel Makkasa	1–1	1–0	0–0	1–1	0–0	1–1	0–0	4–0	1–1	—	2–0	3–1	1–1	2–0	6–2	3–4
Al Mokawloon	1–5	1–2	2–3	0–0	0–0	0–1	2–1	1–1	1–1	0–2	—	0–1	0–0	2–1	0–3	2–3
Petrojet	0–1	1–1	1–0	2–2	1–0	3–0	0–1	1–1	0–1	2–1	1–3	—	0–0	1–0	1–1	1–2
Ittihad El Shorta	1–2	0–1	3–0	2–0	1–0	1–0	2–1	0–0	2–0	3–0	2–0	1–1	—	1–1	1–0	1–3
Smouha	1–1	0–0	3–2	1–1	0–0	2–2	2–4	2–4	2–1	0–1	0–2	0–1	1–1	—	2–2	1–3
Wadi Degla	1–2	2–3	0–0	2–0	3–1	0–5	2–1	1–0	0–4	1–1	4–1	4–2	2–3	1–2	—	0–2
Zamalek	2–2	0–0	0–0	0–0	1–1	2–1	3–2	4–3	1–0	0–1	1–0	2–0	2–0	3–0	1–1	—

Updated to match(es) played on 11 July 2011. Source: fifa.com
Legend: Blue = home team win; Yellow = draw; Red = away team win.

== Top goalscorers ==
Rank	Player	Club	Goals
1	(Egypt) Ahmed Abd El-Zaher	ENPPI	13
1	(Egypt) Shikabala	Zamalek	13
3	(Egypt) Ahmed Eid Abdel Malek	Haras El Hodood	11
4	(Egypt) Ahmed Gaafar	Zamalek	10
5	(Egypt) Ahmed Hassan Mekky	Haras El Hodood	9
5	(Cameroon) Edet Otobong	El-Ittihad	9
5	(Ghana) Godwin Attram	Smouha	9
8	(Egypt) Mohamed Aboutrika	Al-Ahly	8
8	(Egypt) Mohamed Nagy "Geddo"	Al-Ahly	8
8	(Egypt) Ashour El Takky	Wadi Degla	8
8	(Egypt) Hussein Hamdi	Misr Lel Makasa	8
8	(Ghana) Kwabena Yaro	El-Entag El-Harby	8
8	(Egypt) Abdallah Said	Ismaily	8
14	(Burkina Faso) Abdoulaye Cissé	Al-Masry	7
14	(Egypt) Ahmad Belal	Smouha	7
14	(Syria) Abdul Fattah Al Agha	Wadi Degla	7
14	(Ghana) Samuel Afoum	Smouha	7
14	(Ivory Coast) Vincent Die Foneye	ENPPI	7
14	(Egypt) Hosny Abd Rabo	Ismaily	7
14	(Nigeria) Minusu Buba	Ittihad El-Shorta	7
14	(Nigeria) Ndubuisi Godwin Ezeh	Ismaily	7

== Attendances ==
#	Football club	Average attendance
1	Al-Ahly SC	22,370
2	Zamalek SC	16,861
3	Al-Ittihad Alexandria	9,284
4	Al-Masry SC	7,682
5	Ismaily SC	7,365
6	Al-Mokawloon	5,588
7	ENPPI SC	4,860
8	Smouha SC	4,839
9	Haras El-Hodoud SC	4,266
10	Wadi Degla SC	3,892
11	Ittihad El-Shorta	3,625
12	El-Entag El-Harby	3,056
13	Petrojet SC	2,965
14	El-Gouna FC	2,861
15	Misr Lel-Makkasa SC	2,797
16	Tala'ea El-Gaish SC	2,661

== See also ==
- Egypt Cup
- Egyptian Super Cup
- List of football clubs in Egypt
- Cairo derby
