= 2007–08 Egyptian Second Division =

Egyptian football league season

In the 2007–08 season the Egyptian Second Division, a professional football league, introduced a new structure consisting of three groups – A, B and C – each consisting of nine teams. One team from each group won promotion to the Egyptian Premier League. These were Petrol Assyut, Ittihad El Shorta, and Olympic.

== Clubs ==
=== Group A ===
- Talefounat Bani-Sweef
- Nel Sohag

=== Group B ===
- El Shams
- El Rebat Wa El Alanwar
- Al-Sekka Al-Hadid
- Al-Shourta

=== Group C ===
- Tanta FC
- Maleyeit Kafr El Zayiat
- Kahroba Talkh
- Samanoud
- Al-Koroum
- El-Mansura Club
