= ENPPI SC =

Association football club in Cairo, Egypt

- Full name: ENPPI Sporting Club
- Nickname: The Petroleum Club
- Founded: 1985; 41 years ago
- Ground: Petro Sport Stadium
- Capacity: 16,000
- Owner: ENPPI
- Chairman: Ayman El-Sherei
- Manager: Mohamed Barakat
- League: Egyptian Premier League
- Website: enppisc.com

ENPPI SC (Arabic: نادي إنبي لكرة القدم) is an Egyptian football club based in East Cairo. The club competes in the Egyptian Premier League and plays its home matches at Petrosport Stadium in New Cairo. The club's greatest achievement is winning the Egypt Cup twice and being the league runner-up in the 2004–05 season.

In 2026, Sharkia SC merged its football operations with those of Enppi SC to establish a new football club, El Sharkia Enppi SC. The merger followed the establishment of El Sharkia Enppi Football Company, in which Enppi SC holds a 51% stake and Sharkia SC holds the remaining 49%. The merger is limited exclusively to football operations, with both clubs retaining their independence in all other sporting activities.

== Performance in CAF competitions ==
- PR = Preliminary round
- FR = First round
- SR = Second round
- PO = Play-off round
- SF = Semi-final

Season	Competition	Round	Country	Club	Home	Away	Aggregate
2006	CAF Champions League	PR	Ethiopia	Saint George	0–0	0–1	0–1
2007	CAF Confederation Cup	FR	Algeria	ASO Chlef	0–1	0–0	0–1
2009	CAF Confederation Cup	FR	Zimbabwe	CAPS United	2–1	0–0	2–1
2009	CAF Confederation Cup	SR	Zambia	Red Arrows	4–0	0–3	4–3
2009	CAF Confederation Cup	PO	Ivory Coast	ASEC Mimosas	0–0	2–2	2–2 (a)
2009	CAF Confederation Cup	Group A	Algeria	ES Sétif	3–4	3–1	2nd
2009	CAF Confederation Cup	Group A	Angola	Santos	4–0	0–1	2nd
2009	CAF Confederation Cup	Group A	DR Congo	AS Vita Club	3–1	0–3	2nd
2009	CAF Confederation Cup	SF	Mali	Stade Malien	2–2	2–4	4–6
2012	CAF Confederation Cup	FR	Burundi	LLB Académic	4–1	1–1	5–2
2012	CAF Confederation Cup	SR	Mali	CO de Bamako	3–1	0–3	3–4
2013	CAF Confederation Cup	FR	Kenya	Gor Mahia	3–0	0–0	3–0
2013	CAF Confederation Cup	SR	South Africa	SuperSport United	0–0	3–1	3–1
2013	CAF Confederation Cup	PO	Ethiopia	Saint George	3–1	0–2	3–3 (a)
2016	CAF Confederation Cup	FR	Ivory Coast	Africa Sports	4–1	2–0	6–1
2016	CAF Confederation Cup	SR	Gabon	CF Mounana	2–0	0–2	2–2 (4–5 p)

== Performance in domestic competitions ==
Egyptian Clubs Competitions
Year	League	Position	Egypt Cup	Super Cup
2002–03	Egyptian Premier League	4	Quarter Final	
2003–04	Egyptian Premier League	6	Semi Final	
2004–05	Egyptian Premier League	2	Winner	Runner Up
2005–06	Egyptian Premier League	3	Quarter Final	
2006–07	Egyptian Premier League	9	Quarter Final	
2007–08	Egyptian Premier League	7	Runner Up	
2008–09	Egyptian Premier League	5	Runner Up	
2009–10	Egyptian Premier League	8	Quarter-finals	
2010–11	Egyptian Premier League	5	Winner	Runner Up
2011–12	Egyptian Premier League	not finished	not held	
2012–13	Egyptian Premier League	not finished	Quarter Final	
2013–14	Egyptian Premier League	8 (Group 1)	Round of 16	
2014–15	Egyptian Premier League	3	Round of 32	
2015–16	Egyptian Premier League	9	Semi Final	
2016–17	Egyptian Premier League	10	Quarter Final	
2017–18	Egyptian Premier League	6	Round of 32	
2018–19	Egyptian Premier League	9	Quarter Final	
2019–20	Egyptian Premier League	6	Round of 32	
2020–21	Egyptian Premier League	6	Round of 16	
2021–22	Egyptian Premier League	9		

== Players ==
=== Current squad ===
As of 21 August, 2025

Note: Flags indicate national team as defined under FIFA eligibility rules; some limited exceptions apply. Players may hold more than one non-FIFA nationality.

No.	Pos.	Nation	Player
1	GK	EGY	Abdelrahman Samir
3	DF	EGY	Marwan Dawoud
4	DF	EGY	Ahmed Kalosha
5	DF	EGY	Ahmed Sabeha
7	FW	TUN	Rafik Kabou
8	DF	EGY	Hesham Adel
9	FW	EGY	Ahmed Zaki
10	FW	EGY	Kahraba (captain)
11	FW	EGY	Mohamed Hathout
12	MF	EGY	Ali Mahmoud
13	MF	EGY	Ahmed Kofta
14	MF	EGY	Emad Mayhoub
15	DF	EGY	Mohab Samy
16	GK	EGY	Reda El Sayed
17	MF	EGY	Mody Naser

No.	Pos.	Nation	Player
18	FW	MAR	Youssef Oubaba
19	FW	EGY	Ali Ehab
20	DF	EGY	Mohamed Samir
21	FW	EGY	Ahmed Ismail
22	MF	EGY	Ahmed El Agouz (Vice-captain)
23	DF	EGY	Abdallah Adel
26	DF	EGY	Mohamed Samir
27	FW	EGY	Salah Zayed
28	MF	EGY	Hamed Abdallah
29	GK	EGY	Ramadan Mostafa
30	FW	EGY	Aqtay Abdallah
32	DF	EGY	Hazem Temsah
35	FW	SEN	Ousseynou Bodian
38	FW	TAN	Arafat Masoud
39	MF	NGR	Suleiman Kirki
99	FW	EGY	Hossam Ghanem

== Managers ==
- (Egypt) Taha Basry (July 1, 2001 – June 30, 2006)
- (Germany) Rainer Zobel (May 25, 2006 – Feb 1, 2007)
- (Egypt) Hany Ramzy (Feb 1, 2007 – Sept 30, 2008)
- (Egypt) Anwar Salama (July 1, 2007 – Aug 10, 2009)
- (Bulgaria) Stoycho Mladenov (Jan 1, 2010 – July 12, 2011)
- (Egypt) Mokhtar Mokhtar (July 12, 2011 – Dec 27, 2011)
- (Egypt) Hossam El-Badry (Dec 29, 2011 – May 20, 2012)
- (Egypt) Tarek El Ashry (May 23, 2012 – July 9, 2013)
- (Egypt) Mohamed Helmy (2013)
- (Egypt) Khaled Metwali (interim) (2014)
- (Germany) Michael Krüger (2014–2015)
- (Egypt) Hany Ramzy (2015–2016)
- (Egypt) Khalid Mitwally (Caretaker) (2016)
- (Egypt) Alaa Abd Elaal (2016)
- (Egypt) Helmy Toulan (2019–2022)
- (Brazil) Jorvan Vieira (June 5, 2022 – October 2022)
- (Egypt) Ahmed Abdel Moneim (2022)
- (Egypt) Hany Abdallah (2022)
- (Egypt) Talaat Youssef (2022–2023)
- (Egypt) Tamer Mostafa (2023–2024)
- (Egypt) Sayed Yassin (2024–)

== Honours ==
- Egypt Cup
  - Winners (2): 2004–05, 2010–11
