= 2008–09 Egyptian Premier League =

Egyptian Premier League
- Season: 2008–09
- Champions: Al Ahly SC
- Relegated: Telecom Egypt SC; Tersana SC; Olympic Club
- CAF Champions League: Al Ahly SC (1st), Ismaily SC (2nd)
- CAF Confederation Cup: Haras El Hodoud SC (Cup Winner), Petrojet SC (3rd)
- Goals: 582
- Average goals/game: 2.42
- Top goalscorer: (Ghana) Ernest Papa Arko (Tala'ea El Gaish SC), (Angola) Flavio Amado (Al Ahly SC) both 12 goals
- Biggest home win: Ismaily SC 5–1 Al-Mokawloon; Al Ahly SC 4–0 Petrojet SC; Al Ahly SC 4–0 Tersana SC; Al Ittihad Alexandria Club 4–0 Olympic Club; Tersana SC 4–0 Olympic Club
- Biggest away win: Tala'ea El Gaish SC 2–6 Petrojet SC
- Highest scoring: Tala'ea El Gaish SC 2–6 Petrojet SC (8 goals)

The 2008–09 Egyptian Premier League was the fifty-second season of the Egyptian Premier League since its establishment in 1948. The league is composed of sixteen teams. Al Ahly SC became the defending champions for the fourth year in a row and the thirty-third time in the league's history. This season began on 8 August 2008 and ended on 24 May 2009.

== Television ==
Multiple television channels broadcast the league:

- Egyptian Channel 2
- Egyptian Channel 3
- Nile Sport
- Egyptian Satellite TV
- Modern Sport
- Dream 1
- A-R-T Sports (1, 2, 3, 4)
- Al-Riyadiyah (Orbit)
- Al-Hayat TV (1, 2)
- Egyptian Channel 5 (Alexandria Teams)

== Special matches ==
In Egypt, the most anticipated matches are among the "triangle of power": Al Ahly SC, Zamalek SC, and Ismaily SC.

Al Ahly versus Zamalek SC is one of the top derbies in the region, referred to as the "Egyptian Derby," the "Cairo Derby," or "Africa's Derby." It is a match between the two big clubs, as they have 13 Champions League titles distributed among them, five for Zamalek SC and ten for Al Ahly SC.

The Cairo–Ismailia rivalry is another challenging competition in Egyptian football, as Cairo-based clubs Al Ahly SC and Zamalek SC have mixed relations with the city of Ismailia, home to the Ismaily Sports Club, the third most decorated team in Egypt. The Zamalek SC–Ismaily SC games are usually peaceful as the clubs' boards and fans have had traditionally good relations with each other, while the relationship between Al Ahly SC and Ismaily SC fans have typically not been well.

The reason for the conflict between Al Ahly SC and Ismaily SC fans is not clear, but possibly stems back to the 1967 Six-Day War. Israeli troops forced the people of Ismailia and most of the people living on the Suez Canal to evacuate and leave their homes, going westwards towards the inside of Egypt. Ismaily SC asked Al Ahly SC to host them, but the team refused. This spoiled the relationship between the clubs. During Al Ahly SC's reconstruction period in 2004, Al Ahly SC signed a group of former Ismaily SC players including Mohamed Barakat, Islam El-Shater, and Emad El Nahhas, further destroying the relationship between fans.

== Highlights ==
- Mahmoud "Shikabala" Abd El Razek, the Zamalek SC play-maker, was given a 6-month ban by FIFA due to irregularities in his transfer to Zamalek SC from Greek team PAOK FC on July 23 and fined 990.000Euros. He made his comeback on November 7 during a match against Al Mokawloon Al Arab SC.
- Ahmed Hassan, Egypt's National Team captain, makes his first entrance to the Egyptian Premier League since 1998 with his new club Al Ahly SC from R.S.C. Andelecht for an undisclosed amount.
- Ghanaian player "Junior" Agogo was transferred from Nottingham Forest FC to Zamalek SC for a reported 800,000 Euros, a record signing of an African player in Egypt.
- Former PetroJet SC's Ivorian forward Zika Jori stirred Egyptian news with his flight to UAE to complete a transfer to Al-Wasl through buying out the remainder of his contract with the Suez-based club amounting to US$350,000. At the time he was the Egyptian Premier League's top goalscorer.
- Al Masry SC's general manager Hossam Hassan was given a 6 match touchline ban by the Egyptian FA and fined 50,000 Egyptian Pounds in Week 5 due to his arguments with the referee and the fourth official in Al Masry SC's away match with Egyptian Telecom.
- Al Ismaili managed to re-enter former forward Mohamed Mohsen Abo Greisha into their ranks after returning from a one-year loan spell in Zhejiang Lucheng of the Chinese Super League. They contracted the striker to a 3 1/2-year contract.
- El-Masry Chairman and Port Said businessman Sayed Metwally died during Week 10 due to Cardiac arrest. As such in the second set of matches of the week, teams wore black armbands. He was 68.
- Zamalek SC contained Al Ahly SC in the 2nd leg Cairo derby and drew 0–0. Emerging as the star of the night was Hazem Mohamed Emam, 21-year-old full-back as he passed AL Ahly SC defenses early on in the game.
- The draw with Zamalek SC and Ismaily SC with Zamalek SC winning meant Al Ahly SC needed to win against ENPPI SC at home to maintain a 2-point, but stiff opposition and several refereeing arguments ensured that AL Ahly SC drew 2–2. The trophy had a hand in red and a hand in yellow.
- The last match of the season saw Ismaili SC facing Tersana SC and AL Ahly SC facing Tala'ea El Gaish SC simultaneously. Ismaily SC played their game and won 3–0 and had to wait for AL Ahly SC's match to end. They had suffered a setback with Tala'ea El Gaish SC drawing first blood with a 1–0 lead. Al Ahly SC pushed on during one of the team's most tense moments in the league. In the 88th minute Abo Trika scored a header into the top corner of the goal drawing the game and AL Ahly SC pushed on for the second. That came during the 93rd minute through Ahmed Fathi to score AL Ahly SC's second goal of the game. 19-year-old striker Mohamed Talaat scored his first-ever goal for Al Ahly SC since his transfer to the team a moment later with a goal above the opposing goalkeeper to confirm Al Ahly SC's win and the league ends with tie-breaking match in Al Max Stadium in Alexandria.
- 12,000 fans rallied in the 18,000 capacity Al Max Stadium in Alexandria, home of Haras El Hodoud SC. Al Ahly SC faced Ismaily SC in a 1-leg play-off final after both teams scored the same number of points. Al Ahly SC managed a 1–0 victory over their opponents through Angolan pair Gilberto and Flavio. The Angolan winger made a pass inside the box for Flavio to score his 12th goal of the season.

== Governorates ==
Nr.	Name	Area (km^{2})	Population (2006)	Capital	Club(s)
1	Alexandria	2,900	4,110,015	Alexandria	Al Ittihad Alexandria Club – Olympic Club – Haras El Hodoud SC
2	Asyut	25,926	3,441,597	Asyut	Asyut Petroleum SC
3	Cairo	3,435	7,786,640	Cairo	Al Ahly SC – Al Mokawloon Al Arab SC – ENPPI – Tala'ea El Gaish SC –Ittihad El Shorta SC – Telecom Egypt SC
4	Gharbia	25,400	3,790,670	Tanta	Ghazl El Mahalla SC
5	Giza	85,153	6,272,571	Giza	Zamalek SC- Tersana SC
6	Ismailia	1,442	942,832	Ismailia	Ismaily SC
7	Port Said	72	570,768	Port Said	Al Masry SC
6	Suez	17,840	510,935	Suez	Petrojet SC

== Title playoff ==
24 May 2009
19:00 UTC+2

Al Ahly SC	1–0	Ismaily SC
Flavio Amado 5'

Harras El-Hedoud Stadium, Alexandria
Attendance: ~ 16,000
Referee: Carlos Carballo

Al Ahly SC

Ismaily SC

MATCH OFFICIALS

- Assistant referees:
  - n/a
  - n/a
- Fourth official: Essam Abd El Fatah

MATCH RULES

- 90 minutes.
- 30 minutes of extra-time if necessary.
- Penalty shoot-out if scores still level.
- Seven named substitutes
- Maximum of three substitutions.

== League table ==
Pos	Prg	Team	Pld	W	D	L	GF	GA	GD	Pts	Qualification or relegation
1	=	Al Ahly SC (C)	30	18	9	3	52	25	+27	63	2010 CAF Champions League
1	=	Ismaily SC	30	20	3	7	52	31	+21	63	2010 CAF Champions League
3	▲	Petrojet SC	30	13	12	5	47	38	+9	51	2010 CAF Confederation Cup
4	▼	Haras El Hodoud SC	30	14	8	8	34	22	+12	50	2010 CAF Confederation Cup
5	▼	ENPPI SC	30	13	10	7	49	39	+10	49	
6	=	Zamalek SC	30	11	9	10	34	29	+5	42	
7	=	Tala'ea El Gaish SC	30	10	8	12	40	50	−10	38	
8	▲	Al Masry SC	30	9	10	11	36	34	+2	37	
9	▼	Ittihad El Shorta	30	9	10	11	28	29	−1	37	
10	▲	Al Mokawloon Al Arab SC	30	8	13	9	35	37	−2	37	
11	▼	Al Ittihad Alexandria Club	30	10	7	13	29	35	−6	37	
12	▲	Ghazl El Mahalla SC	30	8	9	13	20	26	−6	33	
13	▼	Asyut Petroleum SC	30	9	6	15	25	39	−14	33	
14	=	Telecom Egypt SC (R)	30	7	11	12	43	46	−3	32	Relegation to 2009–10 Egyptian Second Division
15	=	Tersana SC (R)	30	5	9	16	28	45	−17	24	Relegation to 2009–10 Egyptian Second Division
16	=	Olympic Club (R)	30	6	7	17	30	57	−27	24 (Note: 1 point deducted?)	Relegation to 2009–10 Egyptian Second Division

Updated to match(es) played on May 24, 2009. Source: FIFA.com
(C) Champions; (R) Relegated
Notes:
- Top 2 qualify to CAF African Champions League.
- Egyptian Cup winner & 3rd place qualify to CAF Cup.
- Bottom 3 relegate to 2009–10 Egyptian Second Division.

== Top scorers ==
Rank	Scorer	Team	Goals
1	(Ghana) Ernest Papa Arko	Tala'ea El Gaish SC	12
1	(Angola) Flavio Amado	Al Ahly SC	12
2	(Egypt) Ahmed Gaafar	Telecom Egypt SC	11
2	(Iraq) Mostafa Karim	Ismaily SC	11
2	(Egypt) Ihab El-Masry	Al Mokawloon Al Arab SC	11
3	(Egypt) Mohamed Barakat	Al Ahly SC	10
3	(Egypt) Mohamed Aboutrika	Al Ahly SC	10
3	(Egypt) Adel Moustafa	ENPPI SC	10
4	(Egypt) Mohamed El-Gabbas	Al Masry SC	9
4	(Egypt) Ahmed Raouf	ENPPI SC	9
4	(Egypt) Abdallah Said	Ismaily SC	9
4	(Egypt) Ahmed Omran	Telecom Egypt SC	9

Top Scorer by Field Position

POS	Scorer	Team	Goals
FW	(Ghana) Ernest Papa Arko	Tala'ea El Gaish SC	12
FW	(Angola) Flavio Amado	Al Ahly SC	12
MF	(Egypt) Mohamed Barakat	Al Ahly SC	10
MF	(Egypt) Mohamed Aboutraika	Al Ahly SC	10
MF	(Egypt) Adel Moustafa	ENPPI SC	10
DF	(Egypt) Mahmoud Fathalla	Zamalek SC	5

Last updated May 24, 2009, 11:59 AM UTC.

- Event: Week 30 is over.
- Postponed Games: None

== Results ==
Home \ Away	AHL	MOK	ENP	TGS	GMH	HRS	ISM	ITH	MAS	OLY	PET	ASP	ITS	TEL	TER	ZAM
Al Ahly SC	—	2–1	2–2	3–1	1–0	1–0	0–1	2–1	2–1	3–0	4–0	3–0	0–0	2–1	4–0	1–0
Al Mokawloon Al Arab SC	0–0	—	3–3	2–0	2–0	2–1	3–2	0–0	1–1	3–1	0–0	1–0	1–1	2–1	3–1	1–1
ENPPI SC	3–3	2–2	—	4–1	0–0	4–2	3–0	3–2	1–0	1–0	1–1	3–0	0–1	1–0	2–0	1–4
Tala'ea El Gaish SC	2–2	3–2	1–1	—	1–2	2–2	1–0	4–1	0–0	2–1	2–6	1–0	1–0	2–2	1–0	1–0
Ghazl El Mahalla SC	0–0	1–0	1–1	0–0	—	1–0	1–1	2–0	0–1	1–1	2–1	0–1	0–0	0–0	4–1	0–2
Haras El Hodoud SC	0–1	0–0	3–0	1–1	1–0	—	0–0	2–0	1–1	1–0	1–1	2–1	0–1	0–0	1–0	2–1
Ismaily SC	0–1	5–1	3–1	3–1	2–0	2–0	—	3–2	3–2	1–0	1–2	1–0	0–2	2–1	3–0	3–1
Al Ittihad Alexandria SC	1–2	1–0	0–1	1–0	1–0	1–0	1–2	—	2–5	4–0	2–3	0–0	0–0	2–1	0–0	1–0
Al Masry SC	2–0	2–2	0–1	0–1	1–0	0–1	1–2	0–0	—	1–1	2–2	3–1	2–1	2–1	0–2	1–1
Olympic Club	0–3	2–0	1–5	1–1	2–1	1–3	2–3	0–1	1–1	—	3–1	2–2	1–0	2–2	2–0	1–2
Petrojet FC	2–2	1–1	3–2	3–1	1–0	1–0	1–0	1–0	1–3	3–1	—	2–1	2–1	2–2	1–1	0–0
Asyut Petroleum	2–2	3–2	1–2	2–1	1–0	0–1	1–3	1–0	0–1	2–1	1–1	—	0–2	0–2	1–0	2–0
Ittihad El Shorta	1–0	1–0	1–2	3–4	0–0	0–2	2–2	0–0	3–0	3–0	1–1	2–0	—	0–1	2–1	0–2
Telecom SC	2–3	1–0	1–1	3–2	3–1	2–2	0–1	1–2	2–1	2–0	1–2	1–2	2–2	—	3–3	2–4
Tersana SC	2–3	1–1	0–0	2–0	1–2	0–2	1–2	1–2	2–1	4–0	1–1	0–0	2–1	2–2	—	0–0
Zamalek SC	0–0	0–0	1–0	4–2	0–1	0–1	0–1	1–1	2–1	1–3	2–1	0–0	3–1	1–1	1–0	—

Updated to match(es) played on 24 May 2009. Source: angelfire.com
Legend: Blue = home team win; Yellow = draw; Red = away team win.

== Statistics ==
=== Non-Egyptian Players ===
- No. of Non-Egyptian players in the current league 2008–2009:
  - 41 Players total (Excluding players that have ended their contract mid-season)
    - Goalkeepers: 9
    - Defenders: 3
    - Midfielders: 12
    - Forwards: 17
  - Ghana has 10 players in the Egyptian League, followed by Côte d'Ivoire with 5 players and Nigeria and Mozambique with 4 players each.

== Stadiums ==
Cairo International Stadium is home to Cairo teams Al Ahly and Zamalek. Ismailia Stadium is home to Ismaily SC. The Borg El Arab Stadium in Alexandria (capacity: 80,000) is currently mainly used for international competition, as it was constructed as part of Egypt's bid to land the 2010 FIFA World Cup.

=== Clubs stadiums ===
Club	City	Stadium
Al Ahly SC	Cairo	Cairo International Stadium
Zamalek SC	Giza	Cairo International Stadium
Ismaily SC	Ismailia	Ismailia Stadium
Al Ittihad Alexandria Club	Alexandria	Alexandria Stadium
Al Masry SC	Port Said	Al Masry Club Stadium
Al Mokawloon Al Arab SC	Cairo	Arab Contractors Stadium
ENPPI SC	Cairo	Petro Sport Stadium
Tala'ea El Gaish SC	Cairo	Gehaz El Reyada Stadium
Olympic Club	Alexandria	Alexandria Stadium
Ittihad El Shorta SC	Cairo	Arab Contractors Stadium
Ghazl El Mahalla SC	El Mahalla El Kubra	Ghazl El Mahalla Stadium
Haras El Hodoud SC	Alexandria	Haras El Hodoud Stadium
Telecom Egypt SC	Cairo	Arab Contractors Stadium
Asyut Petroleum SC	Asyut	Petro Sport Stadium
Petrojet SC	Cairo	Suez Stadium
Tersana SC	Giza	Mit Okba Stadium

== See also ==
- List of football clubs in Egypt
- Egypt Cup
- Egyptian Super Cup
- List of football clubs in Egypt
- Cairo derby
