= Damanhour Stadium =

Proposed football stadium in Damanhour, Egypt

Coordinates: 31.039037°N 30.434330°E

Damanhour International Stadium
- Interactive map of Damanhour International Stadium
- Full name: Damanhour International Stadium
- Location: Damanhour, Egypt
- Operator: Ala'ab Damanhour SC
- Capacity: 60,000
- Surface: Grass

Construction
- Built: Cancelled
- Cost: £E340 million

Damanhour International Stadium was a proposed football stadium in Damanhour, Egypt that if built, would have become home to Ala'ab Damanhour Sporting Club, replacing their current home ground Ala'ab Damanhour Stadium, and one of the venues to host the 2010 FIFA World Cup if Egypt was selected as hosts. The stadium had a planned capacity of 60,000 all-seated.

After South Africa was selected to host the World Cup, the construction and building of this stadium was completely halted.
