= Smouha SC =

Sports club in Alexandria, Egypt

Smouha Sporting Club
- Full name: Smouha Sporting Club (Egyptian Pronunciation: سموحة, Semouha)
- Nicknames: The Blue Wave (Egyptian Pronunciation: الموج الأزرق, El Moug El Azra')
- Founded: 29 December 1949; 76 years ago
- Ground: Alexandria Stadium
- Capacity: 13,660
- Chairman: Dr. Mohamed Belal
- Manager: Ahmed Abdel Aziz
- League: Egyptian Premier League
- 2025–26: 7th
- Website: smouhaclub.com
Home colours	Away colours

Smouha Sporting Club (Arabic: نادي سموحة الرياضي), simply known as Smouha, is an Egyptian sports and social club based in Alexandria. The club is mainly known for its professional football team, which currently plays in the Egyptian Premier League, the top tier of the Egyptian football league system.

With 195,000 members, Smouha is the largest club in Alexandria, operating two branches in the city and one branch in Borg el Arab. The club offers the most sports offered the city and hosts major national equestrian and modern pentathlon tournaments, as well as virtually all swimming competitions in the Alexandria governorate.

== History ==
Smouha SC was founded on 29 December 1949, and was named after the club's first president & founder Joseph Smouha, who was a Jewish textile manufacturer, philanthropist, property developer and designer. In 1917, Smouha came to Alexandria. Tracts of land were sold to private investors who wanted to build their homes in the area, which rapidly turned into the most exclusive neighborhood in Alexandria, later known as "Smouha City".

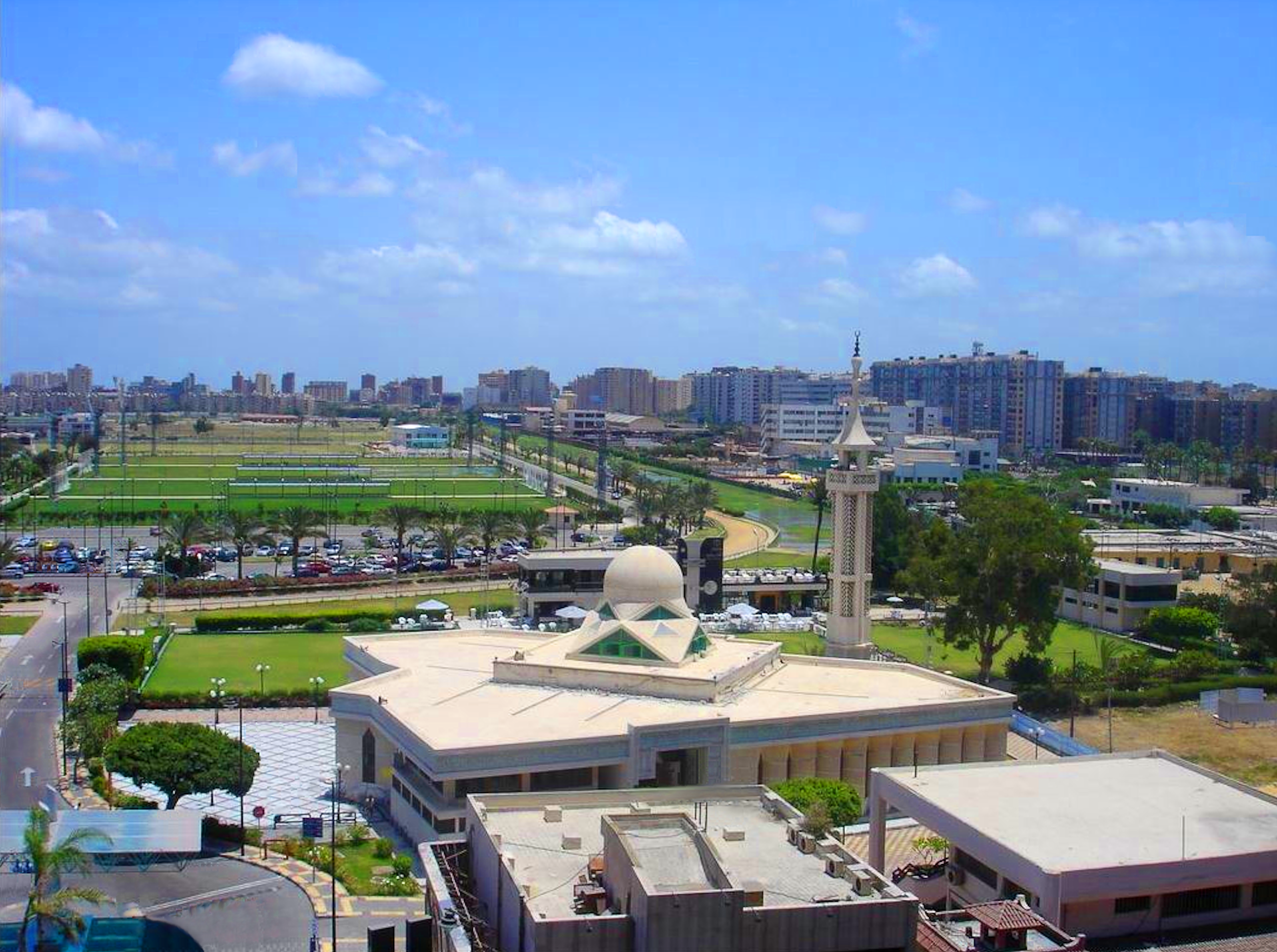
Smouha main branch

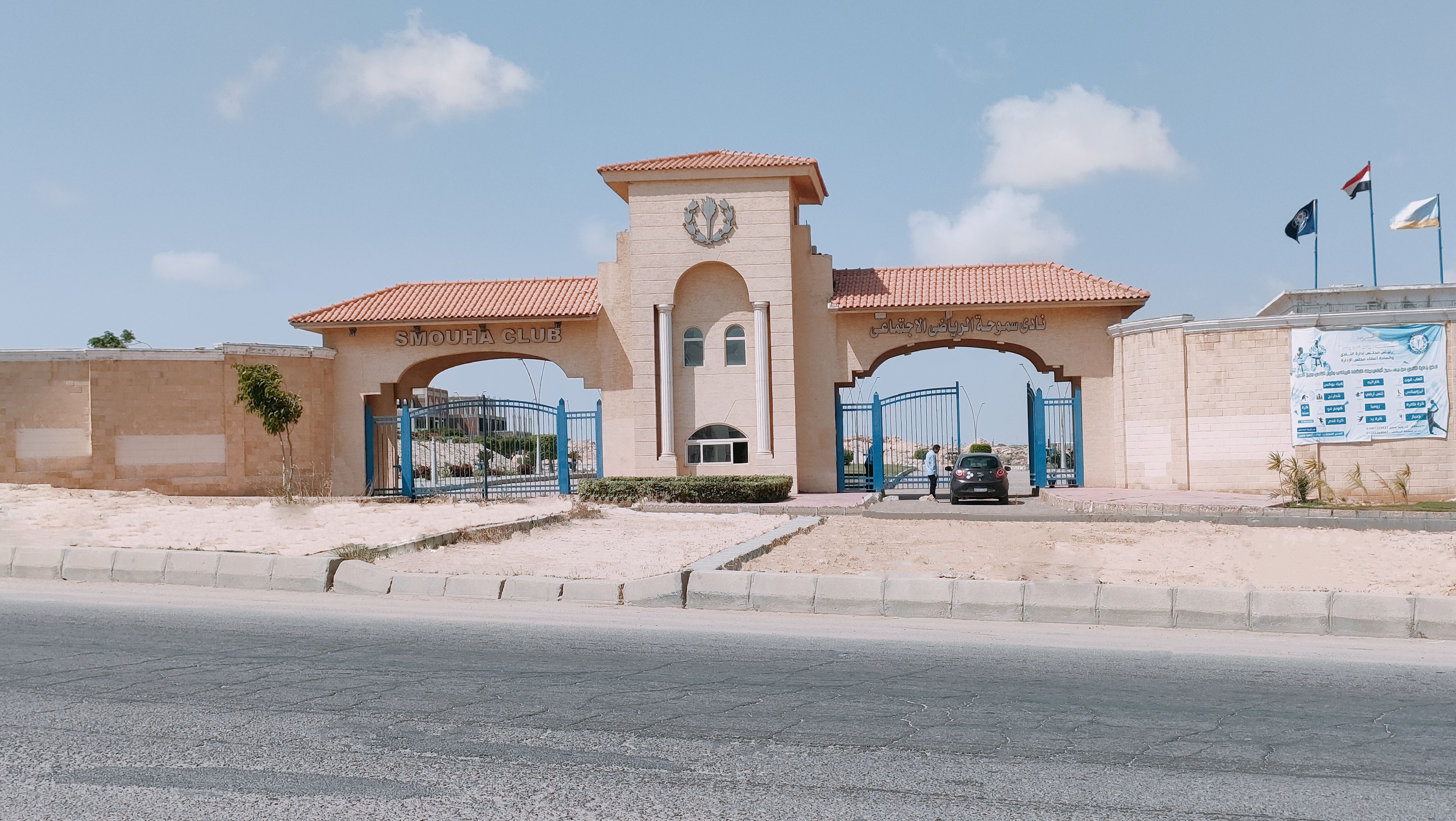
New Borg El Arab city branch

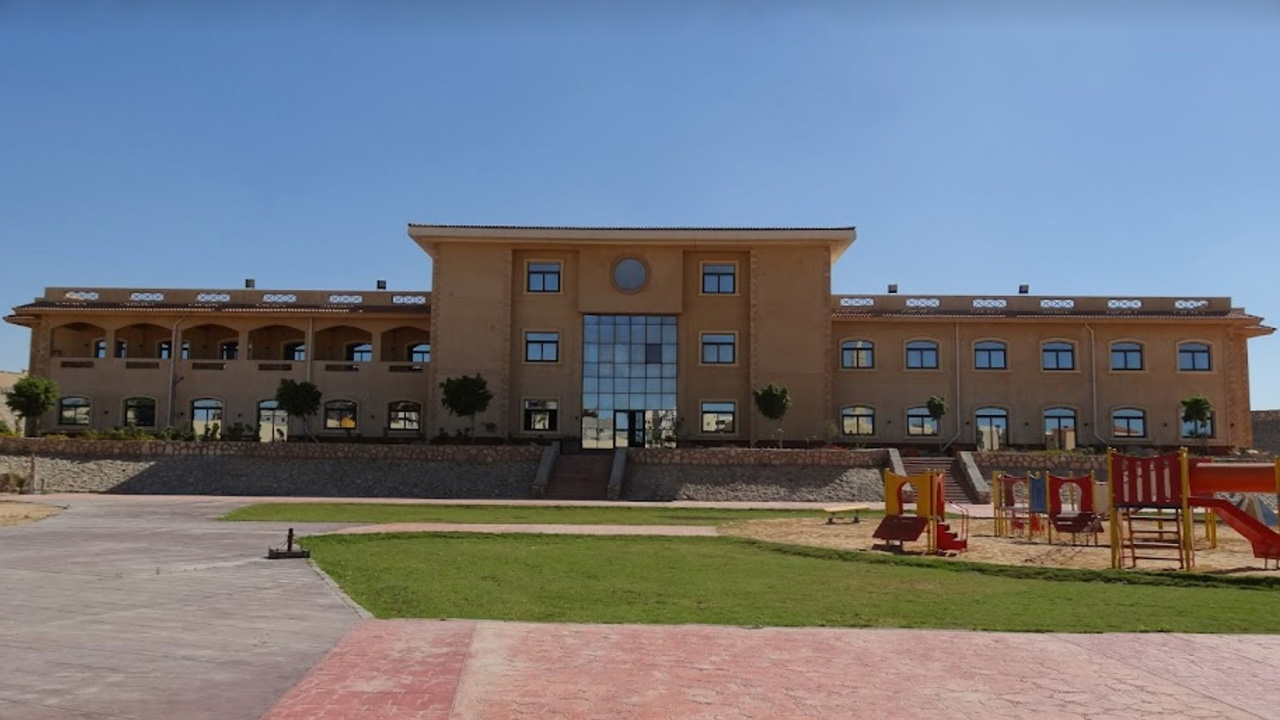
New Borg El Arab city branch

Smouha Sporting Club began with the spread of golf across Egypt. The golf course was situated within the infield of a racetrack which Smouha had previously constructed, regarded as the best golf grass in the Arab world, as a result of its location above the swampland. The Smouha Sporting Club grew to include tennis courts along with the golf course and race track, and was formally established in 1949. Joseph Smouha was the first chief executive of the sporting club, and today the club remains open under the leadership of Engineer Mohammed Farag Amer. Although the Nasser regime confiscated Smouha City from the Smouha family in 1956, Joseph Smouha had donated much of the property to public institutions and the sporting club remained open. Currently, Smouha Sporting Club provides sportive, social, and cultural services to over 120,000 people—marking it as one of the largest sporting clubs in all of Egypt. The club is particularly famous for its football teams, but supports numerous individual and sports teams.

Sports

- Athletics
- Basketball
- Bowling
- Chess
- Croquet
- Football (first team)
- Football (juniors)
- Gymnastics
- Handball
- Judo
- Karate
- Swimming and water games
- Squash
- Table tennis
- Taekwando
- Tennis
- Volleyball

== Recent additions and branches ==
In 2007, the architectural firm Environmental Consulting Group (ECO Group) began designing new properties for Smouha Sporting Club. Established in 1995, ECO Group is a Middle-Eastern firm of about 100 employees led by Professor Amr El-Sherif. Throughout its history, ECO Group has been involved in construction projects totally over US$300 million. ECO Group has developed the Smouha Sporting Club's club house, cafeteria, swimming pools, and facilities for children. The club operates two branches as of 2023; Smouha and New Borg El Arab.

== Football ==
Since reaching the top flight, Smouha SC has generally maintained a mid-table status supported by relative financial stability. The club's ascent began in the 2008–09 Egyptian Second Division season, where they finished in second place; a defeat to Kafr El-Zayat in the final match narrowly cost them promotion, allowing El-Mansoura to advance instead. The following year, during the 2009–10 season, Smouha secured its historic first promotion to the Egyptian Premier League following a 7–1 victory over Abu Qair Semad on April 28, 2010. While the club narrowly avoided relegation during its debut 2010–11 campaign, it rebounded strongly early in the 2012–13 season, recording notable victories against Al Ahly (1–0), Ghazl El Mahalla (5–1), and Wadi Degla (3–0).

== Alexandria Derby ==
As the two primary clubs in Alexandria, Smouha and Al-Ittihad share a competitive local rivalry, with their head-to-head matches serving as a major fixture at the Alexandria Stadium.

== Honours ==
=== Domestic ===
==== League ====
- Egyptian Premier League
  - Runners up : 2013–14

==== Cup ====
- Egypt Cup
  - Runners up: 2013–14, 2017–18

== Performance in CAF competitions ==
- PR = Preliminary round
- FR = First round
- SR = Second round
- PO = Play-off round

Season	Competition	Round	Country	Club	Home	Away	Aggregate
2015	CAF Champions League	PR	Libya	Al Ahli Tripoli	1–0	0–1	1–1 (5–3 p)
2015	CAF Champions League	FR	Nigeria	Enyimba	2–0	0–1	2–1
2015	CAF Champions League	SR	Congo	AC Léopards	2–0	0–1	2–1
2015	CAF Champions League	Group A	Morocco	Moghreb Tétouan	3–2	1–2	4th
2015	CAF Champions League	Group A	Sudan	Al Hilal	1–1	0–2	4th
2015	CAF Champions League	Group A	DR Congo	TP Mazembe	0–2	0–1	4th
2017	CAF Confederation Cup	FR	Kenya	Ulinzi Stars	4–0	0–3	4–3
2017	CAF Confederation Cup	PO	South Africa	Bidvest Wits	1–0	0–0	1–0
2017	CAF Confederation Cup	Group C	Zambia	ZESCO United	1–1	0–1	4th
2017	CAF Confederation Cup	Group C	Angola	Recreativo do Libolo	2–0	0–0	4th
2017	CAF Confederation Cup	Group C	Sudan	Al Hilal El Obeid	1–1	1–2	4th

== Season records ==
Season	Div.	Pos.	Pl.	W	D	L	GS	GA	Pts.	Egypt Cup	cContinental	
2008–09	cSecond Division	2 (Group C)	30	20	7	3	59	22	67	Second round	-	
2009–10	Second Division	1 (Group C)	30	19	8	3	60	25	65	Second round	-	
2010–11	Premier League	15	30	6	10	14	33	45	28	Round of 16	-	
2011–12	Not finished									Not held	-	
2012–13	Not finished									Round of 32	-	
2013–14	Premier League	2	23	12	6	5	30	22	42	Runners-up	-	
2014–15	Premier League	10	38	14	9	15	43	37	51	Semi-final	CL	Group stage
2015–16	Premier League	3	34	13	16	5	45	37	55	Quarter-final	-	
2016–17	Premier League	5	34	15	12	7	49	40	57	Semi-final	CC	Group stage
2017–18	Premier League	5	34	14	9	11	37	26	51	Runners-up	-	
2018–19	Premier League	12	34	8	14	12	33	41	38	Round of 16	-	
2019–20	Premier League	5	34	11	18	5	44	33	51	Round of 16	-	
2020–21	Premier League	4	34	12	18	4	54	41	54	Round of 16	-	

== Managers ==
- (Egypt) Rabie Yassin (1 July 2006 – 30 June 2007)
- (Egypt) Mimi Abdel Razek (July 2007 – 1 May 2010)
- (Egypt) Mohsen Saleh (18 May 2010 – 6 August 2010)
- (France) Patrice Neveu (6 August 2010 – 21 November 2010)
- (Egypt) Hamza El-Gamal (21 November 2010 – 27 May 2011)
- (Egypt) Shawky Gharieb (1 November 2011 – 20 July 2013)
- (Egypt) Hamada Sedki (July 2013 – Oct 2014)
- (France) Denis Lavagne (Oct 2014 – Dec 2014)
- (Egypt) Helmy Toulan (June 2015 – July 2015)
- (Egypt) Mimi Abdel Razek (July 2015)
- (Egypt) Mohamed Youssef (July 2015 – 1 November 2015 )
- (Egypt) Mimi Abdel Razek (2 November 2015 – 2016)
- (Egypt) Helmy Toulan (June 2016 – July 2016)
- (Brazil) Jorvan Vieira (2016)
- (Egypt) Helmy Toulan (2016)
- (Egypt) Moamen Soliman (2017)
- (Czech Republic) Frantisek Straka (2017)
- (Egypt) Talaat Youssef (2018)
- (Egypt) Mimi Abdel Razek (2018) (caretaker)
- (Egypt) Ali Maher (2018)
- (Egypt) Tarek Yehia (2018–2019)
- (Egypt) Adel Abdelrahman (2019) (caretaker)
- (Egypt) Hossam Hassan (2019–2020)
- (Egypt) Hamada Sedki (13 January 2020 – 6 September 2020)
- (Egypt) Ahmed Samy (6 September 2020 – 2 May 2022)
- (Egypt) Abdel Hamid Bassiouny (3 May 2022 – 2 September 2022)
- (Egypt) Tarek El Ashry (4 September 2022 – 25 January 2023)
- (Egypt) Ahmed Samy (26 January 2023 – 2025present)
