= Al Nasr SC (Egypt) =

Association football club in Cairo, Egypt

- Full name: Al Nasr Sporting Club نادي النصر للألعاب الرياضية
- Short name: NAS
- Founded: 6 June 1958; 67 years ago
- Ground: El Nasr Stadium, Cairo
- Chairman: Amr Abdel Haq
- Manager: Yasser radwan
- League: Egyptian Second Division
- 2017–18: Egyptian Premier League, 18th (relegated)
Home colours	Away colours	Third colours

Al Nasr Sporting Club (Arabic: نادي النصر للألعاب الرياضية), is an Egyptian football club based in Cairo, Egypt. The club currently plays in the Egyptian Second Division, the second highest league in the Egyptian football league system.

== History ==
Al Nasr was very close to promote to the Egyptian Premier League for its first time ever during the 2008–09 Egyptian Second Division season; but a 2–2 draw with Suez Cement in the last week secured the promotion spot for El Entag El Harby to the 2009–10 Egyptian Premier League instead. However, Al Nasr were able to finally clinch promotion for the first time in their history during the 2013–14 Egyptian Second Division season. Al Nasr ended that season in second place.

== Current squad ==
Egyptian Football Association (EFA) rules are that an Egyptian team can only have 3 foreign born players in the squad.

Note: Flags indicate national team as defined under FIFA eligibility rules; some limited exceptions apply. Players may hold more than one non-FIFA nationality.

No.	Pos.	Nation	Player
1	GK	EGY	Sameh Mahmoud
3	DF	EGY	El Sayed Sadoni
4	DF	EGY	Ahmed Said
5	DF	EGY	Ahmed Felix
6	DF	EGY	Mohamed Belal
7	FW	EGY	Zizo
8	MF	EGY	Karim Ata
9	FW	EGY	Ahmed El Saidy
11	MF	EGY	Mostafa Samara
12	MF	EGY	Mostafa Hani
14	MF	EGY	Karim Al Komy
15	MF	EGY	Abdallah Gomma

No.	Pos.	Nation	Player
16	GK	EGY	Essam Sarwat
17	DF	EGY	Dokile Mohamed ^{(captain)}
18	MF	UGA	Isiagi Dan Opolot
19	FW	EGY	Ibrahim Mostafa
20	MF	EGY	Ahmed El Agoz
21	MF	EGY	Ehab Mahrous
22	DF	EGY	Hmoda Samir
24	MF	EGY	Ahmed Ghanem Soltan
25	FW	GHA	Samuel Manti
27	MF	EGY	Mohamed El-Azab
29	DF	MLI	Ousman Keita
30	MF	EGY	Mohamed Essam
31	DF	EGY	Ahmed Yassin
