= Egyptian Second Division =

- Founded: 1948
- Folded: 2023
- Country: Egypt
- Confederation: CAF
- Number of clubs: 48 (3 groups of 16)
- Level on pyramid: 2
- Promotion to: Egyptian Premier League
- Relegation to: Egyptian Third Division
- Domestic cup: Egypt Cup
- International cup(s): CAF Confederation Cup (via winning Egypt Cup)
- Broadcaster(s): Nile Sport (selected matches)

The Egyptian Second Division (Arabic: دوري القسم الثاني المصري) was an Egyptian semi-professional football league representing the second tier of the Egyptian football league system until 2023. It was administered by the Egyptian Football Association. It was below the top professional league in the country, the Egyptian Premier League, and above the regional league Egyptian Third Division.

The league was reformed in 1977, and consisted of multiple groups covering different parts of Egypt, with the winner of each group either gaining automatic promotion to the Egyptian Premier League, or earning a place in the promotion play-offs, depending on the number of groups.

In August 2022, the EFA announced that the league would be abolished following the conclusion of the 2022–23 season, and two new professional and semi-professional leagues, called Egyptian Second Division A and Egyptian Second Division B, respectively, would be created and begin from the following season.

The competition was officially abolished on 9 July 2023, after the play-off phase of the 2022–23 season concluded.

== Previous Seasons ==
=== Promoted teams (from the Second Division to the Professional League) ===
Second Division Season	Clubs Promoted to the Premier League		
Second Division Season	Group A	Group B	Group C
2003–04	Asyut Cement	El-Gaish	Suez Cement
2004–05	Aluminium	El Mokawloon	Koroum
2005–06	Asyut Petroleum	Petrojet; Tersana	El-Olympi; Tanta
2006–07	Aluminium	Itesalat	Baladeyet Al-Mahalla
2007–08	Asyut Petroleum	Ittihad El-Shorta	Olympi
2008–09	El Gouna	El-Entag El-Harby	El Mansoura
2009–10	Misr El-Maqasha	Wadi Degla	Smouha
2010–11	El Dakhleya	Ghazl El-Mehalla	Telephonat Bani Sweif
2011–12	Season wasn't completed		
2012–13	Qanah FC	El Minya FC	El Raja
2013–14	Season wasn't completed		
2014–15	Ala'ab Damanhour	Alassiouty Sport	Al Nasr
2015–16	Ghazl El Mahalla SC	Aswan SC	El-Entag El-Harby SC
2016–17	Al Assiouty Sport	Al Nasr	El Raja
2017–18	El Gouna	Nogoom	Haras El Hodoud
2018–19	Aswan	FC Masr	Tanta
2019–20	National Bank of Egypt SC	Ceramica Cleopatra FC	Ghazl El Mahalla
2020–21	Eastern Company SC	Coca-Cola FC	Pharco FC

=== Relegated Teams (from the Second Division to the Third Division) ===
Second Division Season	Clubs Relegated to the Third Division at the end of the Second Division Season		
Second Division Season	Group A	Group B	Group C
2008–09	Beni Suef SC; Quos FC; Al Badari SC	Ghazl El Suez FC; Misr Insurance FC; Menouf SC	Damietta SC; El Henawy FC; Talkha Electricity FC
2009–10	Shouban Qenah; Wadi El Gedid FC; Madina Monowara	Suez Cement; Banha FC; Al-Sekka Al-Hadid	Kafr Al-Sheikh; Al Zarka SC; Senbalawin FC

=== Relegated Teams (from the Professional League to the Second Division) ===
Premier League Season	Second Division Season	Clubs Relegated at the end of the Premier League Season and the beginning of the Second Division Season
2003–04	2004–05	Aswan, Olympic El Qanal FC, Koroum
2004–05	2005–06	Baladeyet El-Mahalla, Tersana, Mansoura
2005–06	2006–07	Asyut Cement, Aluminium, Koroum
2006–07	2007–08	Tanta, Petrol Asyut, El-Olympi
2007–08	2008–09	Aluminium, Baladeyet El-Mahalla, Suez Cement
2008–09	2009–10	Itesalat, Tersana, Olympi
2009–10	2010–11	Ghazl Mehalla, Mansoura, Asyut Petroleum

=== Promoted Teams (from the Third Division to the Second Division) ===
Season	Clubs Promoted at the beginning of the Second Division Season	To Group
2009–10	Al Wasta SC, Wadi El Gedid FC, Madina Monowara	Group A
2009–10	Wadi Degla, Sharkia SC, Al Merreikh SC, Banha FC	Group B
2009–10	El Raja, Samanoud FC	Group C

=== Summary ===
Second Division Seasons	Professional League Seasons	Third Division Seasons	At the Beginning of the Second Division Season		At the End of the Second Division Season	
Second Division Seasons	Professional League Seasons	Third Division Seasons	Promoted from the Third Division of the previous season	Relegated from the Professional League of the previous season	Promoted to the Professional League of the next season	Relegated to the Third Division of the next season
2003–04	2003–04	2003–04			Suez Cement; El-Gaish; Asyut Cement	
2004–05	2004–05	2004–05		Aswan; Qanah; Koroum	Al-Mokaweloon; Aluminium; Koroum	
2005–06	2005–06	2005–06		Baladeyet El-Mahalla; Tersana; Mansoura	Petrojet; Tersana; Tanta; Petrol Asyut; Olympi	
2006–07	2006–07	2006–07		Asyut Cement; Aluminium; Koroum	Itesalat; Aluminium; Baladeyet El-Mahalla	
2007–08	2007–08	2007–08		Tanta; Petrol Asyut; Olympi	Group A Petrol Asyut; Group B Ittihad El-Shorta; Group C Olympi	
2008–09	2008–09	2008–09		Aluminium; Baladeyet El-Mahalla; Suez Cement	Group A El Gouna; Group B El-Entag El-Harby; Group C Mansoura	Group A Beni Suef SC, Quos, Al Badari SC; Group B Ghazl El Suez FC, Misr Insurance, Menouf; Group C Damietta SC, El Henawy FC, Kahraba Talka
2009–10	2009–10	2009–10	Group A Al Wasta SC, Wadi El Gedid FC, Madina Monowara; Group B Wadi Degla, Sharkia SC, Al Merreikh, Banha; Group C El Raja, Samanoud	Itesalat; Tersana; Olympi	Group A Misr Lel Makasa; Group B Wadi Degla; Group C Smouha	Group A Shouban Qenah, Wadi El Gedid FC, Madina Monowara; Group B Banha, Gomhoriat Shebin, Al-Sekka Al-Hadid; Group C Kafr Al-Sheikh, Al Zarka, Senbalawin
2010–11	2010–11	2010–11		Ghazl Mehalla; Mansoura; Petrol Asyut		
