= El Koroum SC =

Association football club in Alexandria, Egypt

El Koroum
- Full name: Al-koroum
- Dissolved: 2006
- Ground: Alexandria Stadium
- Capacity: 20,000
- League: Egyptian Second Division
- 2009–10: 2nd (Group C)
Home colours	Away colours

El Koroum (Arabic: نادي الكروم, Chrome) was an Egyptian football club formerly based in Alexandria. Their home stadium was Alexandria Stadium.

== The End ==
In 2006 Ahmed Abu Dahab the owner of El Koroum group announced that the club would cease operations on all sports facilities. No further explanation was given.

== Squad ==
Note: Flags indicate national team as defined under FIFA eligibility rules; some limited exceptions apply. Players may hold more than one non-FIFA nationality.

No.	Pos.	Nation	Player
1	GK	(Iraq) IRQ	Saad Naser
2	DF	(Egypt) EGY	Ahmed Gomaa
3	DF	(Egypt) EGY	Ashraf Abdel Halim
4	DF	(Egypt) EGY	Mohsen Mahmoud
5	DF	(Egypt) EGY	Osama Ammar
6	DF	(Egypt) EGY	Emad Suleiman
7	MF	(Egypt) EGY	Ihab El-Mahas

No.	Pos.	Nation	Player
8	MF	(Egypt) EGY	Ihab Nabil
9	MF	(Egypt) EGY	Mohamed Saher
10	MF	(Egypt) EGY	Mohamed Abdul Salam
11	MF	(Egypt) EGY	Sherif Farouk
12	MF	(Egypt) EGY	Walid El-Nakoury
13	FW	(Egypt) EGY	Basem Abdel Sattar

== Managers ==
- (Egypt) Salah El-Nahy (July 1, 1982 – December 16, 2000)
- (Egypt) Talaat Youssef (December 16, 2000 – July 1, 2001)
- (Egypt) Salah El-Nahy (July 1, 2002 – July 1, 2006)
- (Egypt) Magdy Allam (July 1, 2008 – August 14, 2011)
