= Suez Cement SC =

Association football club in Suez, Egypt

Suez Cement
- Full name: Asmant el-Suweis
- Founded: 1995; 31 years ago
- Ground: Suez Stadium; Suez, Egypt
- Capacity: 25,000
- Chairman: Hussein Mogawer
- Manager: ?
- League: Egyptian Second Division
- 2009–10: 13th (Group A)
Home colours	Away colours

Suez Cement or Asmant el-Suweis (Arabic: اسمنت السويس) [Ashman as-Suways]; is an Egyptian football club based in Suez. It was a member of the Egyptian Premier League. Suez Cement is one of the more recent clubs in world football as it was founded in 1995 which continued for the cement company and the name of the same club.

== Current squad 2007–08 ==
Note: Flags indicate national team as defined under FIFA eligibility rules; some limited exceptions apply. Players may hold more than one non-FIFA nationality.

No.	Pos.	Nation	Player
1	GK	EGY	Ali Hegazi
2	DF	EGY	Ahmed Fawzy
3	MF	EGY	Ahmed Roshdy
4	MF	EGY	Hamada Talba
5	DF	EGY	Mostafa Talba
6	FW	CMR	Gorsh Areno
7	MF	EGY	Ibrahim Baïrour
8	FW	EGY	Mohamed Abdel-Fattah
9	MF	EGY	Hamada Shanh
10	MF	EGY	Alaa Khalifa
11	FW	EGY	Abdel-Aziz Ragab
12	MF	BRA	Rogério
13	MF	EGY	Mohamed Hafez

No.	Pos.	Nation	Player
14	DF	EGY	Kamal Ali
15	FW	EGY	Mohamed Eto
16	GK	EGY	Amr Youssef El-Demashqy
17	MF	EGY	Said Abdel-Aziz
18	DF	EGY	Samy Qomsan
19	FW	EGY	Reda Ragab
20	FW	EGY	Mohamed El-Soghayar
21	FW	EGY	Ekramy Abdel-Aziz
22	GK	EGY	Abdel-Malik El-Baghdadi
23	MF	EGY	Sherif Shahata
24	MF	EGY	Adel Mostafa
25	DF	EGY	Mohamed Salam
26	MF	EGY	Ahmed Shahdy
