= Al Aluminium SC =

Association football club in Nag Hammadi, Egypt

Al Aluminium
- Full name: Al Aluminium Sporting Club
- Short name: ALU
- Founded: 1962; 63 years ago
- Ground: Aluminium Stadium; Nag Hammâdi, Egypt
- Capacity: 16,000
- League: Egyptian Second Division

Al Aluminium Sports Club (Arabic: نادي الألومنيوم الرياضي), is an Egyptian football club based in Nag Hammâdi, Egypt.

The club plays in the Egyptian Second division, the second-highest tier of the Egyptian football league system.

== Squad 2007/08 ==
Note: Flags indicate national team as defined under FIFA eligibility rules; some limited exceptions apply. Players may hold more than one non-FIFA nationality.

No.	Pos.	Nation	Player
-	GK	(Egypt) EGY	Mohamed El-Sayed
-	GK	(Egypt) EGY	Yasser Qadry
-	DF	(Egypt) EGY	Ibrahim Abdul Rahim
-	DF	(Egypt) EGY	Hani Barakat
-	DF	(Egypt) EGY	Ahmed Kamel
-	DF	(Egypt) EGY	Mahmoud Al-Husseini
-	DF	(Egypt) EGY	Emad Suleiman
-	DF	(Egypt) EGY	Hussein Mohamed
-	DF	(Egypt) EGY	Hassan Gomaa
-	DF	(Egypt) EGY	Mohamed Abdel Qadir
-	DF	(Egypt) EGY	Yasser Mostafa
-	DF	(Egypt) EGY	Ahmed Mohsen

No.	Pos.	Nation	Player
-	DF	(Egypt) EGY	Mohamed Abul Magd
-	DF	(Egypt) EGY	Hisham Ali
-	MF	(Egypt) EGY	Ashraf Azab
-	MF	(Egypt) EGY	Ibrahim Castilla
-	MF	(Egypt) EGY	Ramadan Abou El-Hagag
-	MF	(Egypt) EGY	Mostafa Abbas
-	MF	(Egypt) EGY	Adel Emam
-	MF	(Egypt) EGY	Tamer Darwish
-	FW	(Egypt) EGY	Karim Abdul Hakim
-	FW	(Egypt) EGY	Harby Tawfik
-	FW	(Egypt) EGY	Mostafa Badawi
-	FW	(Egypt) EGY	Kerlos Naser

== Managers ==
- (Egypt) Mahmoud Abou-Regaila (2000)
- (Egypt) Hussein Abdel-Latif (2011–2012)
- (Egypt) Shedeid Qinawy (2014)
- (Egypt) Essam Marei (2014–2015)
- (Egypt) Hisham Salah (2015–)
