= 2017–18 Egyptian Second Division =

Egyptian Second Division
- Season: 2017–18
- Dates: 14 September 2017 – 19 April 2018
- Champions: Group A: El Gouna; Group B: Nogoom El Mostakbal; Group C: Haras El Hodoud
- Promoted: Group A: El Gouna; Group B: Nogoom El Mostakbal; Group C: Haras El Hodoud
- Relegated: Group A: KIMA Aswan Beni Mazar Qena Al Madina Al Monawara Al Salam; Group B: El Sharkia National Bank Ittihad El Shorta Kahrabaa Ismailia Al Fanar; Group C: Sherbeen MS Minyat Samanoud Ittihad Nabarouh Beni Ebeid MS Koum Hamada
- Matches: 690
- Goals: 1,578 (2.29 per match)
- Biggest home win: Tersana 6–0 Al Fanar (6 October 2017); Fayoum 6–0 Qena (14 October 2017)
- Biggest away win: Ittihad El Shorta 0–4 Tersana (29 September 2017); Dayrout 0–4 Fayoum (2 December 2017); Al Fanar 0–4 Ittihad El Shorta (7 January 2018); Sohag 0–4 El Gouna (3 February 2018)
- Highest scoring: Kafr El Sheikh 5–3 Pharco (25 November 2017); Ittihad El Shorta 4–4 Suez (10 February 2018)
- Longest winning run: 9 games Kafr El Sheikh
- Longest unbeaten run: 22 games El Minya
- Longest winless run: 28 games Al Fanar
- Longest losing run: 15 games Al Fanar

The 2017–18 Egyptian Second Division was the 38th edition of the Egyptian Second Division, the top Egyptian semi-professional level for football clubs, since its establishment in 1977. The season began on 14 September 2017 and concluded on 19 April 2018. Fixtures for the 2017–18 season were announced on 30 August 2017.

El Gouna, Nogoom El Mostakbal and Haras El Hodoud won Group A, Group B and Group C respectively and secured the promotion to the 2018–19 Egyptian Premier League.

== Team changes ==
The following teams have changed division since the 2016–17 season.

=== To Second Division ===
Promoted from Third Division

- Al Salam
- Al Walideya
- Beni Mazar
- El Shams
- Al Fanar
- Abou Sakal
- Beni Ebeid
- MS Minyat Samanoud
- Abou Qir Fertilizers

Relegated from Premier League

- Aswan
- Al Nasr Lel Taa'den
- El Sharkia

=== From Second Division ===
Relegated to Third Division

- Naser El Fekreia
- Tahta
- Al Badari
- Al Wasta
- MS Tamya
- El Sekka El Hadid
- Damietta
- Eastern Company
- Telecom Egypt
- Manshiyat El Shohada
- El Horreya
- BWADC
- Badr
- Dikernis
- Said El Mahalla

Promoted to Premier League

- Al Assiouty Sport
- Al Nasr
- El Raja

== Teams ==
A total of forty-eight teams competed in the league, including thirty-six sides from the 2016–17 season, three relegated from the 2016–17 Egyptian Premier League and nine promoted from the 2016–17 Egyptian Third Division.

Note: Table lists in alphabetical order.

=== Group A ===
Locations of the 2017–18 Egyptian Second Division Group A teams

Club	City	Stadium	2016–17 season
Al Aluminium	Nag Hammadi	Aluminium Stadium	4th in Second Division Group A
Aswan	Aswan	Aswan Stadium	16th in Premier League
Beni Mazar	Beni Mazar	Matai Stadium	1st in Third Division Group C
Beni Suef	Beni Suef	Beni Suef Club Stadium	6th in Second Division Group A
Dayrout	Dayrout	MS Abnub Stadium	11th in Second Division Group A
Fayoum	Fayoum	Fayoum Stadium	8th in Second Division Group A
El Gouna	El Gouna	El Gouna Stadium	3rd in Second Division Group A
KIMA Aswan	Aswan	KIMA Aswan Stadium	10th in Second Division Group A
Al Madina Al Monawara	Luxor	Luxor Stadium	9th in Second Division Group A
El Minya	El Minya	El Minya University Stadium	7th in Second Division Group A
Al Nasr Lel Taa'den	Aswan	Aswan Stadium	17th in Premier League
Qena	Qena	Qena Stadium	12th in Second Division Group A
Al Salam	Esna	Luxor Stadium	1st in Third Division Group A
Sohag	Sohag	Sohag Stadium	2nd in Second Division Group A
Telephonat Beni Suef	Beni Suef	Al Assiouty Sport Stadium	5th in Second Division Group A
Al Walideya	Asyut	Al Walideya Stadium	1st in Third Division Group B

=== Group B ===
Locations of the 2017–18 Egyptian Second Division Group B teams

Club	City	Stadium	2016–17 season
Abou Sakal	Arish	Arish Stadium	1st in Third Division Group F
Ceramica Cleopatra	Cairo	Cairo International Stadium	4th in Second Division Group B
Al Fanar	Port Said	Al Rebat & Al Anwar Stadium	1st in Third Division Group E
FC Masr	Cairo	Cairo International Stadium	2nd in Second Division Group B
Gomhoriat Shebin	Shebin El Koum	Banha Stadium	7th in Second Division Group B
Ittihad El Shorta	Cairo	Police Academy Stadium	11th in Second Division Group B
Kahrabaa Ismailia	Ismailia	Kahrabaa Ismailia Stadium	10th in Second Division Group B
Al Merreikh	Port Said	Al Merreikh Stadium	12th in Second Division Group B
National Bank	Cairo	National Bank of Egypt Stadium	14th in Second Division Group B
Nogoom El Mostakbal	Cairo	Nogoom El Mostakbal Stadium	8th in Second Division Group B
El Qanah	Suez	Suez Canal Stadium	6th in Second Division Group B
El Shams	Cairo	El Shams Stadium	1st in Third Division Group D
El Sharkia	Zagazig	Zagazig University Stadium	18th in Premier League
Suez	Suez	Suez Stadium	3rd in Second Division Group B
Tersana	Cairo	30 June Stadium	9th in Second Division Group B
Al Zarka	Al Zarka	Al Zarka Stadium	13th in Second Division Group B

=== Group C ===
Locations of the 2017–18 Egyptian Second Division Group C teams

Club	City	Stadium	2016–17 season
Abou Qir Fertilizers	Abou Qir	Abou Qir Fertilizers Stadium	1st in Third Division Group I
Ala'ab Damanhour	Damanhour	Ala'ab Damanhour Stadium	9th in Second Division Group C
Baladeyet El Mahalla	El Mahalla	Ghazl El Mahalla Stadium	2nd in Second Division Group C
Beni Ebeid	Beni Ebeid	Beni Ebeid Stadium	1st in Third Division Group G
Coca-Cola	Cairo	Cairo International Stadium	5th in Second Division Group B
Ghazl El Mahalla	El Mahalla	Ghazl El Mahalla Stadium	5th in Second Division Group C
Al Hammam	Mersa Matruh	MS Al Hammam Stadium	11th in Second Division Group C
Haras El Hodoud	Alexandria	Haras El Hodoud Stadium	3rd in Second Division Group C
Ittihad Nabarouh	Nabarouh	Ittihad Nabarouh Stadium	8th in Second Division Group C
Kafr El Sheikh	Kafr El Sheikh	Kafr El Sheikh Stadium	12th in Second Division Group C
El Mansoura	El Mansoura	El Mansoura Stadium	6th in Second Division Group C
MS Koum Hamada	Koum Hamada	MS Koum Hamada Stadium	7th in Second Division Group C
MS Minyat Samanoud	Samanoud	El Mansoura Stadium	1st in Third Division Group H
Olympic Club	Alexandria	Ezzedin Yacoub Stadium	10th in Second Division Group C
Pharco	Alexandria	Borg El Arab Stadium	4th in Second Division Group C
Sherbeen	Sherbeen	Sherbeen Stadium	13th in Second Division Group C

== Results ==
=== League tables ===
==== Group A ====
Pos	Team	Pld	W	D	L	GF	GA	GD	Pts	Promotion, qualification or relegation
1	El Gouna (C, P)	30	21	8	1	63	22	+41	71	Promotion to the Premier League
2	El Minya	30	19	8	3	58	27	+31	65	
3	Aswan	30	14	10	6	33	20	+13	52	
4	Beni Suef	30	14	8	8	37	30	+7	50	
5	Al Aluminium	30	12	12	6	43	27	+16	48	
6	Telephonat Beni Suef	30	13	6	11	30	28	+2	45	
7	Al Nasr Lel Taa'den	30	10	12	8	36	31	+5	42	
8	Faiyum	30	9	12	9	42	35	+7	39	
9	Sohag	30	10	9	11	34	36	−2	39	
10	Dayrout	30	9	10	11	36	42	−6	37	
11	Al Walideya	30	9	9	12	39	49	−10	36	
12	KIMA Aswan (R)	30	9	6	15	35	45	−10	33	Relegation to the Third Division
13	Beni Mazar (R)	30	7	5	18	52	73	−21	26	Relegation to the Third Division
14	Qena (R)	30	6	8	16	25	47	−22	26	Relegation to the Third Division
15	Al Madina Al Monawara (R)	30	5	8	17	31	54	−23	23	Relegation to the Third Division
16	Al Salam (R)	30	4	7	19	27	55	−28	19	Relegation to the Third Division

Source: Kooora
Rules for classification: 1) Points; 2) Goal difference; 3) Goal scored; 4) Head-to-Head points (only if needed to decide champion, teams for promotion or teams for relegation).
(C) Champions; (P) Promoted; (R) Relegated

==== Group B ====
Pos	Team	Pld	W	D	L	GF	GA	GD	Pts	Promotion, qualification or relegation
1	Nogoom El Mostakbal (C, P)	28	17	8	3	32	16	+16	59	Promotion to the Premier League
2	Tersana	28	17	6	5	45	19	+26	57	
3	Ceramica Cleopatra	28	14	8	6	35	17	+18	50	
4	FC Masr	28	12	9	7	31	24	+7	45	
5	El Qanah	28	12	7	9	35	26	+9	43	
6	El Shams	28	13	4	11	30	31	−1	43	
7	Al Merreikh	28	9	10	9	29	23	+6	37	
8	Suez	28	10	6	12	34	32	+2	36	
9	Gomhoriat Shebin	28	9	8	11	27	34	−7	35 (Note: Head-to-head record: Gomhoriat Shebin 7 pts, Al Zarka 5 pts, El Sharkia 4 pts.)	
10	Al Zarka	28	9	8	11	24	33	−9	35	
11	El Sharkia (R)	28	9	8	11	27	29	−2	35	Relegation to the Third Division (Note: Since the 16th placed team, Abou Sakal, will play in the 2018–19 season of the Second Division; the Egyptian Football Association decided that the 11th placed team in Group B of the 2017–18 Egyptian Second Division will relegate to the 2018–19 Egyptian Third Division to fill the vacant spot that was created due to reassigning Abou Sakal to the 2018–19 Egyptian Second Division.)
12	National Bank (R)	28	8	8	12	24	30	−6	32	Relegation to the Third Division
13	Ittihad El Shorta (R)	28	6	13	9	33	36	−3	31	Relegation to the Third Division
14	Kahrabaa Ismailia (R)	28	8	7	13	29	36	−7	31	Relegation to the Third Division
15	Al Fanar (R)	28	0	4	24	10	59	−49	4	Relegation to the Third Division
16	Abou Sakal (D)	0	0	0	0	0	0	0	0	Withdrew (Note: On 19 September 2017, the Egyptian Football Association announced that Abou Sakal, a team from Arish in North Sinai, would play their home games at Ismailia Stadium instead of their regular stadium Arish Stadium due to the insurgency in Sinai. Three days later, the club announced on its official Facebook page that the club 'refuses' to play their home games outside Arish as the home area and stadium 'are completely safe' to host matches. On 1 October 2017, the club officially announced its withdrawal from the league after no agreement was reached with the EFA. The EFA later accepted the resignation and the club league results were expunged.)

Source: Kooora
Rules for classification: 1) Points; 2) Goal difference; 3) Goal scored; 4) Head-to-Head points (only if needed to decide champion, teams for promotion or teams for relegation).
(C) Champions; (D) Disqualified; (P) Promoted; (R) Relegated

==== Group C ====
Pos	Team	Pld	W	D	L	GF	GA	GD	Pts	Promotion, qualification or relegation
1	Haras El Hodoud (C, P)	30	23	4	3	44	17	+27	73	Promotion to the Premier League
2	Kafr El Sheikh	30	18	8	4	39	17	+22	62	
3	Baladeyet El Mahalla	30	13	10	7	42	28	+14	49	
4	Coca-Cola	30	12	10	8	39	26	+13	46	
5	El Mansoura	30	11	10	9	32	26	+6	43	
6	Pharco	30	11	10	9	35	30	+5	43	
7	Ghazl El Mahalla	30	9	11	10	36	32	+4	38	
8	Olympic Club	30	8	14	8	27	25	+2	38	
9	Al Hammam	30	10	7	13	34	37	−3	37	
10	Abou Qir Fertilizers	30	7	15	8	30	34	−4	36	
11	Ala'ab Damanhour	30	8	11	11	26	30	−4	35	
12	Sherbeen (R)	30	7	11	12	28	42	−14	32	Relegation to the Third Division
13	MS Minyat Samanoud (R)	30	7	10	13	23	46	−23	31	Relegation to the Third Division
14	Ittihad Nabarouh (R)	30	7	8	15	23	40	−17	29	Relegation to the Third Division
15	Beni Ebeid (R)	30	6	9	15	25	39	−14	27	Relegation to the Third Division
16	MS Koum Hamada (R)	30	6	6	18	29	43	−14	24	Relegation to the Third Division

Source: Kooora
Rules for classification: 1) Points; 2) Goal difference; 3) Goal scored; 4) Head-to-Head points (only if needed to decide champion, teams for promotion or teams for relegation).
(C) Champions; (P) Promoted; (R) Relegated

=== Results tables ===
==== Group A ====
Home \ Away	ALU	ASW	BMZ	BSU	DAY	FAY	GOU	KIM	MAD	MIN	NLT	QEN	SAL	SOH	TBS	WAL
Al Aluminium	—	1–0	4–2	0–0	2–0	3–3	1–1	4–1	1–1	0–1	1–1	1–1	3–0	2–1	2–0	1–0
Aswan	1–1	—	3–0	1–0	1–0	2–1	0–1	1–0	2–0	2–3	1–0	1–0	1–1	1–0	0–1	1–1
Beni Mazar	2–3	1–4	—	2–0	4–3	2–0	1–3	4–2	3–2	3–3	0–2	4–1	3–2	1–2	0–3	2–4
Beni Suef	3–2	0–0	2–2	—	1–0	2–0	0–1	1–0	2–1	1–1	0–1	1–0	4–0	1–0	2–1	1–0
Dayrout	1–0	2–2	2–2	2–1	—	0–4	0–0	3–1	1–0	2–1	1–0	0–0	2–1	0–0	2–1	0–0
Fayoum	0–0	1–1	3–2	3–3	3–3	—	0–1	0–1	3–0	1–1	1–0	6–0	2–1	1–0	0–0	1–1
El Gouna	1–2	2–2	2–1	2–2	2–1	4–1	—	1–0	5–0	3–1	2–0	3–1	4–1	0–0	3–1	6–1
KIMA Aswan	1–0	0–0	3–2	1–3	1–1	2–0	1–2	—	1–1	1–2	1–2	1–0	3–2	3–1	2–0	1–1
Al Madina Al Monawara	1–1	0–1	2–1	0–1	1–1	1–0	0–3	3–3	—	2–3	1–1	2–1	1–1	2–2	0–1	3–2
El Minya	2–1	0–0	3–0	2–0	3–2	0–0	2–2	2–1	3–1	—	0–1	1–0	4–0	2–0	2–0	4–1
Al Nasr Lel Taa'den	0–0	1–2	2–2	1–1	3–3	2–3	1–1	2–0	2–0	0–2	—	4–2	1–1	0–2	1–0	2–2
Qena	1–1	2–1	2–2	4–0	1–0	1–1	0–1	0–0	1–0	0–3	0–0	—	1–3	0–3	1–3	1–2
Al Salam	0–3	0–1	2–0	0–2	1–2	0–0	0–1	1–2	2–1	0–0	0–2	0–0	—	0–0	2–3	2–3
Sohag	1–1	0–1	2–1	1–2	1–0	2–1	0–4	2–1	3–2	1–1	2–2	2–1	5–2	—	1–1	0–0
Telephonat Beni Suef	0–2	0–0	2–1	1–0	3–1	0–0	0–1	2–0	2–0	0–2	0–0	0–1	1–0	1–0	—	1–0
Al Walideya	1–0	1–0	5–2	1–1	2–1	0–3	1–1	2–1	1–3	2–3	0–2	1–2	0–2	2–0	2–2	—

Source: Kooora
Legend: Blue = home team win; Yellow = draw; Red = away team win.

==== Group B ====
Home \ Away	ABS	CCL	FAN	FCM	GOM	ITS	KIS	MER	NBE	NOG	QAN	SHM	SHR	SUE	TER	ZAR
Abou Sakal	—	—	—	—	—	—	—	—	—	—	—	—	—	—	—	—
Ceramica Cleopatra	—	—	3–0	2–0	3–1	1–2	0–0	1–0	0–0	0–0	2–1	2–0	2–0	2–4	0–1	3–0
Al Fanar	—	0–1	—	1–1	0–3	0–4	1–1	0–1	0–1	0–2	1–2	2–3	0–2	0–3	0–2	0–0
FC Masr	—	1–1	1–0	—	3–0	1–1	1–1	1–1	0–1	0–0	0–0	1–0	0–2	1–2	0–2	3–0
Gomhoriat Shebin	—	1–1	3–1	0–0	—	1–0	2–1	0–2	0–1	0–0	1–0	1–1	1–0	0–1	1–0	1–0
Ittihad El Shorta	—	1–1	3–1	0–1	0–0	—	2–2	2–0	0–0	2–2	1–1	2–0	0–0	4–4	0–4	0–1
Kahrabaa Ismailia	—	0–2	2–0	2–2	4–1	0–1	—	1–0	2–1	0–1	0–0	0–1	2–1	1–0	0–2	1–2
Al Merreikh	—	1–2	2–1	1–2	3–0	1–1	2–1	—	3–0	2–0	0–0	2–0	1–0	1–1	1–1	0–0
National Bank	—	1–0	1–0	1–2	2–1	2–2	2–1	2–2	—	0–1	0–0	2–3	1–2	3–2	0–1	1–1
Nogoom El Mostakbal	—	0–0	3–0	0–2	4–2	1–0	1–0	2–1	0–0	—	2–1	1–0	1–0	1–0	1–0	3–0
El Qanah	~~4–0~~	1–0	2–0	1–2	1–0	4–1	4–0	1–0	1–0	3–0	—	0–1	3–2	1–0	1–2	3–4
El Shams	—	1–0	1–0	1–0	1–1	3–1	1–2	2–1	2–1	1–1	3–1	—	1–0	1–0	0–1	0–2
El Sharkia	—	1–1	1–1	1–2	2–1	1–1	3–3	1–0	1–0	1–2	0–0	2–1	—	0–0	0–2	0–1
Suez	—	0–1	2–1	1–2	0–2	2–1	1–2	0–0	1–0	0–1	1–1	1–1	1–2	—	1–0	3–1
Tersana	—	0–2	6–0	2–0	1–1	0–0	1–0	1–1	2–1	1–1	3–1	3–1	1–2	2–1	—	3–2
Al Zarka	—	0–2	3–0	1–2	2–2	2–1	1–0	0–0	0–0	0–1	0–1	1–0	0–0	0–2	1–1	—

Source: Kooora
Legend: Blue = home team win; Yellow = draw; Red = away team win.

==== Group C ====
Home \ Away	AQF	ADM	BMH	BEB	COC	GMH	HAM	HRS	ITN	KSH	MAN	MSK	MSM	OLY	PHA	SHE
Abou Qir Fertilizers	—	2–2	1–2	5–0	0–3	1–1	2–0	0–0	2–1	1–1	1–0	0–0	2–3	0–0	0–0	1–1
Ala'ab Damanhour	0–0	—	0–2	1–0	1–1	1–2	1–1	2–3	1–0	1–0	0–1	1–0	4–0	0–0	1–0	0–0
Baladeyet El Mahalla	0–0	5–2	—	2–0	1–1	1–1	2–1	1–2	2–0	1–0	0–0	1–0	3–0	1–1	1–1	1–1
Beni Ebeid	0–0	1–0	2–0	—	1–1	2–2	0–1	0–2	1–0	0–1	2–2	2–0	0–1	2–1	0–0	1–2
Coca-Cola	1–1	2–1	1–1	0–2	—	1–0	0–1	1–0	5–1	0–1	4–1	1–0	2–0	1–2	0–0	3–0
Ghazl El Mahalla	0–1	2–1	1–1	1–0	1–1	—	3–1	1–2	0–1	1–2	1–2	0–1	1–1	1–1	1–1	2–0
Al Hammam	2–0	2–0	1–2	2–0	1–2	0–0	—	0–1	2–0	1–2	0–0	3–2	0–0	2–1	0–2	1–2
Haras El Hodoud	1–2	1–0	2–0	1–0	2–1	1–0	4–2	—	0–0	1–0	1–0	2–1	2–0	0–0	2–0	3–2
Ittihad Nabarouh	1–2	0–0	0–3	2–1	1–1	1–2	2–1	0–3	—	0–0	1–1	3–1	1–2	2–1	1–0	0–1
Kafr El Sheikh	3–0	2–0	2–0	1–1	2–1	2–1	2–0	1–1	1–1	—	1–0	1–0	1–1	1–0	5–3	3–0
El Mansoura	1–1	0–0	2–1	2–0	2–1	0–0	1–1	0–1	4–1	1–0	—	1–1	3–0	0–1	1–0	2–2
MS Koum Hamada	3–0	1–3	0–2	3–3	0–1	1–0	2–1	1–2	0–2	0–1	3–0	—	1–1	0–1	2–3	2–0
MS Minyat Samanoud	1–1	0–0	1–3	1–1	3–2	0–2	1–3	0–1	1–0	0–1	0–3	1–1	—	0–0	1–0	2–1
Olympic Club	1–1	1–1	3–2	1–1	0–0	1–3	1–1	0–1	0–0	0–1	1–0	2–2	4–0	—	1–0	2–0
Pharco	3–1	0–1	1–0	2–1	0–0	2–4	1–1	1–0	2–1	1–1	1–0	3–0	2–2	2–0	—	2–2
Sherbeen	3–2	1–1	1–1	2–1	0–1	2–2	1–2	1–2	0–0	0–0	0–2	2–1	1–0	0–0	0–2	—

Source: Kooora
Legend: Blue = home team win; Yellow = draw; Red = away team win.
