= List of football stadiums in Egypt =

The following is a list of football stadiums in Egypt, ordered by capacity. Currently all stadiums with a capacity of 10,000 or more are included; most large stadiums in Egypt are used for association football, with some also used for athletics and rugby union. Egypt has the biggest stadium in the Middle East and the second-biggest in Africa.

== Current stadiums ==
#	Image	Stadium	Capacity	City	Home team(s)	Opened
1		Misr Stadium	93,940	New Administrative Capital	Egypt football team	2024
2		Borg El Arab Stadium	86,000	Borg El Arab	Egypt football team	2007
3		Cairo International Stadium	75,000	Cairo	Egypt football team Zamalek; Al Ahly	23 July 1960
4		Egyptian Army Stadium	45,000	Suez	Petrojet	2009
5		Arab Contractors Stadium	35,000	Cairo	Al Mokawloon Al Arab	1979
6		30 June Stadium	30,000	Cairo	Pyramids	2009
7		Al Salam Stadium	30,000	Cairo	El Entag El Harby	2009
8		Beni Ebeid Stadium	30,000	Beni Ebeid	Beni Ebeid	1990
9		Ghazl El Mahalla Stadium	29,000	El Mahalla	Baladeyet El Mahalla; Ghazl El Mahalla; Said El Mahalla	1947
10		Cairo Military Academy Stadium	28,500	Cairo	For all teams	1989
11		Suez Stadium	27,000	Suez	Suez Cement; Petrojet	1990
12		El Sekka El Hadid Stadium	25,000	Cairo	El Sekka El Hadid	1913
13		Mokhtar El Tetsh Stadium	3,000	Cairo	Al Ahly	1917
14		Petro Sport Stadium	25,000	New Cairo	ENPPI	2006
15		Ismailia Stadium	23,525	Ismailia	Ismaily	1934
16		Haras El Hodoud Stadium	22,000	Alexandria	Haras El Hodoud	
17		Suez Canal Stadium	22,000	Ismailia		
18		Helmy Zamora Stadium	20,000	Giza		
19		Fayoum Stadium	20,000	Fayoum	Misr Lel Makkasa	
20		Sohag Stadium	20,000	Sohag	Sohag	1930
21		Qena Stadium	20,000	Qena	Qena	
22		Zagazig Stadium	20,000	Zagazig	El Sharkia	1950
23		Al Masry Club Stadium	18,000	Port Said	Al Masry	1955
24		El Mansoura Stadium	18,000	El Mansoura	El Mansoura	1962
25		Aluminium Stadium	16,000	Nag Hammadi	Al Aluminium	
26		Izz al-Din Yacoub Stadium	15,000	Alexandria	Olympic	
27		Alexandria Stadium	13,660	Alexandria	Al Ittihad Alexandria; Smouha	1929
28		Asiut University Stadium	12,000	Asyut	Asyut Petroleum	
29		Aswan Stadium	11,000	Aswan	Aswan	1962
30		Beni Suef Stadium	10,000	Beni Suef	Telephonat Beni Suef	
31		Desouk Stadium	10,000	Desouk	Desouk SC	1 January 1976
32		Khaled Bichara Stadium	10,000	El Gouna	El Gouna	2009
33		Arba’een Sporting Stadium	10,000	Asyut		

== Top 10 stadiums by capacity ==
Location of the top 10 stadiums by capacity in Egypt.

== See also ==
- List of African stadiums by capacity
- List of indoor arenas in Egypt
- List of association football stadiums by capacity
- List of association football stadiums by country
- List of sports venues by capacity
- List of stadiums by capacity
- Lists of stadiums
- Football in Egypt
