= 2016–17 Egyptian Premier League =

Egyptian Premier League
- Season: 2016–17
- Dates: 15 September 2016 – 17 July 2017
- Champions: Al Ahly; 39th Premier League title
- Relegated: Aswan; Al Nasr Lel Taa'den; El Sharkia
- Champions League: Al Ahly; Misr Lel Makkasa
- Confederation Cup: Zamalek; Al Masry
- Matches: 306
- Goals: 670 (2.19 per match)
- Top goalscorer: Ahmed El Sheikh (17 goals)
- Biggest home win: Ismaily 5–0 Aswan (14 December 2016)
- Biggest away win: Al Nasr Lel Taa'den 0–4 ENPPI (15 September 2016); Al Nasr Lel Taa'den 0–4 Misr Lel Makkasa (19 December 2016); Al Nasr Lel Taa'den 1–5 Ismaily (18 March 2017); El Entag El Harby 1–5 Wadi Degla (18 March 2017)
- Highest scoring: Wadi Degla 4–3 ENPPI (22 November 2016); Misr Lel Makkasa 3–4 Smouha (19 February 2017); El Dakhleya 3–4 Zamalek (28 May 2017)
- Longest winning run: 8 games Misr Lel Makkasa
- Longest unbeaten run: 34 games Al Ahly
- Longest winless run: 14 games Aswan
- Longest losing run: 7 games El Sharkia
- Average attendance: 0 (attendances banned)

The 2016–17 Egyptian Premier League (also known as the Obour Land Premier League for sponsorship reasons) was the 58th season of the Egyptian Premier League, the top Egyptian professional league for association football clubs, since its establishment in 1948. The season began on 15 September 2016 and concluded on 17 July 2017. Fixtures for the 2016–17 season were announced on 22 August 2016.

On 29 May 2017, Al Ahly won a record thirty-ninth title and successfully defended their title with four games in hand following their 2–2 draw with Misr Lel Makkasa.

Al Nasr Lel Taa'den, El Sharkia and Tanta have entered as the three promoted teams from the 2015–16 Egyptian Second Division.

== Teams ==
Locations of the 2016–17 Egyptian Premier League teams

A total of eighteen teams will compete in the league – the top fifteen teams from the previous season, as well as three teams promoted from the Second Division.

=== Stadia and locations ===
Note: Table lists in alphabetical order.

Team	Location	Stadium
Al Ahly	Cairo	Al Salam Stadium
Aswan	Aswan	Aswan Stadium
El Dakhleya	Cairo	Police Academy Stadium
ENPPI	Cairo	Petro Sport Stadium
El Entag El Harby	Cairo	Al Salam Stadium
Ismaily	Ismailia	Ismailia Stadium
Al Ittihad	Alexandria	Borg El Arab Stadium
Al Masry	Port Said	Borg El Arab Stadium
Misr Lel Makkasa	Fayoum	Fayoum Stadium
Al Mokawloon	Cairo	Arab Contractors Stadium
Al Nasr Lel Taa'den	Aswan	Aswan Stadium
Petrojet	Suez	Suez Stadium
El Sharkia	Zagazig	Zagazig Stadium
Smouha	Alexandria	Borg El Arab Stadium
Tala'ea El Gaish	Cairo	Cairo Military Academy Stadium
Tanta	Tanta	Tanta Stadium
Wadi Degla	Cairo	Cairo International Stadium
Zamalek	Cairo	Petro Sport Stadium

=== Personnel and kits ===
Team	Manager	Kit manufacturer	Shirt sponsor
Al Ahly	(Egypt) Hossam El Badry	Sporta	Vodafone, Huawei (front); Juhayna, Royal Dutch Shell (back)
Aswan	(Egypt) Osama Orabi	Uhlsport	
El Dakhleya	(Egypt) Alaa Abd El Aal	Nike	SAIB Bank (back)
ENPPI	(Egypt) Tarek El Ashry	Nike	McDonald's
El Entag El Harby	(Egypt) Shawky Gharieb	Uhlsport	
Ismaily	(Egypt) Ashraf Khedr	Lotto	Sinai University (front); Atyab (back)
Al Ittihad	(Spain) Juan José Maqueda	Adidas	Obour Land (front); Atyab (back)
Al Masry	(Egypt) Hossam Hassan	Adidas	
Misr Lel Makkasa	(Egypt) Ehab Galal	Adidas	
Al Mokawloon	(Egypt) Mohamed Ouda	Adidas	Obour Land (front); SAIB Bank (back)
Al Nasr Lel Taa'den	(Egypt) Osama Orabi	Lotto	
Petrojet	(Egypt) Talaat Youssef	Uhlsport	Obour Land
El Sharkia	(Egypt) Emad El Nahas	Legea	Obour Land (front); Atyab (back)
Smouha	(Egypt) Moamen Soliman	Erreà	McDonald's (front); SAIB Bank (back)
Tala'ea El Gaish	(Egypt) Tarek Yehia	Macron	McDonald's
Tanta	(Egypt) Khaled Eid	Uhlsport	McDonald's (front); Atyab, SAIB Bank (back)
Wadi Degla	(Egypt) Mido	Leap	Wadi Degla
Zamalek	(Portugal) Augusto Inácio	Joma	SAIB Bank (front); Lactel, Gionee (back)

=== Managerial changes ===
Team	Outgoing manager	Manner of departure	Date of vacancy	Position in table	Incoming manager	Date of appointment
Tala'ea El Gaish	(Egypt) Tarek Yehia	Resigned	10 July 2016	Pre-season	(Egypt) Hassan Shehata	11 July 2016
Smouha	(Egypt) Helmy Toulan	Mutual consent	11 July 2016	Pre-season	(Brazil) Jorvan Vieira	11 July 2016
Zamalek	(Egypt) Mohamed Helmy	Resigned	27 July 2016	Pre-season	(Egypt) Moamen Soliman (caretaker)	28 July 2016
El Dakhleya	(Egypt) Farouk Gaafar	Resigned	3 August 2016	Pre-season	(Egypt) Diaa Abdel Samad	5 August 2016
El Sharkia	(Egypt) Ayman El Mezaien	Resigned	3 August 2016	Pre-season	(Egypt) Tarek Yehia	15 August 2016
Ismaily	(Egypt) Khaled El Kamash	Sacked	3 August 2016	Pre-season	(Egypt) Ayman El Gamal (caretaker)	6 August 2016
Al Ahly	(Netherlands) Martin Jol	Resigned	18 August 2016	Pre-season	(Egypt) Hossam El Badry	24 August 2016
Ismaily	(Egypt) Ayman El Gamal	End of caretaker spell	19 August 2016	Pre-season	(Egypt) Emad Soliman	19 August 2016
Tala'ea El Gaish	(Egypt) Hassan Shehata	Resigned	11 September 2016	Pre-season	(Egypt) Ahmed El Agoz (caretaker)	11 September 2016
Ismaily	(Egypt) Emad Soliman	Resigned	14 October 2016	8th	(Egypt) Ashraf Khedr (caretaker)	14 October 2016
Al Nasr Lel Taa'den	(Egypt) Hamada Raslan	Sacked	22 October 2016	18th	(Egypt) Ashraf Arab (caretaker)	22 October 2016
Al Nasr Lel Taa'den	(Egypt) Ashraf Arab	End of caretaker spell	27 October 2016	18th	(Egypt) Osama Orabi	27 October 2016
Smouha	(Brazil) Jorvan Vieira	Sacked	1 November 2016	2nd	(Egypt) Helmy Toulan	1 November 2016
El Sharkia	(Egypt) Tarek Yehia	Resigned	4 November 2016	18th	(Egypt) Ahmed El Agoz	12 November 2016
Tala'ea El Gaish	(Egypt) Ahmed El Agoz	Sacked	4 November 2016	6th	(Egypt) Ahmed Samy	9 November 2016
Wadi Degla	(France) Patrice Carteron	Mutual consent	8 November 2016	9th	(Egypt) Mido	8 November 2016
Aswan	(Egypt) Emad El Nahas	Resigned	17 November 2016	16th	(Egypt) Mohamed Amer	26 November 2016
ENPPI	(Egypt) Alaa Abdel Aal	Resigned	18 November 2016	12th	(Egypt) Tarek El Ashry	26 November 2016
Zamalek	(Egypt) Moamen Soliman	Resigned	19 November 2016	6th	(Egypt) Mohamed Salah (caretaker)	19 November 2016
El Dakhleya	(Egypt) Diaa Abdel Samad	Resigned	26 November 2016	16th	(Egypt) Ashraf Kasem	4 December 2016
Zamalek	(Egypt) Mohamed Salah	End of caretaker spell	30 November 2016	6th	(Egypt) Mohamed Helmy	30 November 2016

== Results ==
=== League table ===
Pos	Team	Pld	W	D	L	GF	GA	GD	Pts	Qualification or relegation
1	Al Ahly (C)	34	25	9	0	62	14	+48	84	Qualification for the Champions League
2	Misr Lel Makkasa	34	23	5	6	65	34	+31	74	Qualification for the Champions League
3	Zamalek (Note: Zamalek was deducted three points as they did not show up to their home match against Misr Lel Makkasa.)	34	20	6	8	42	24	+18	63	Qualification for the Confederation Cup (Note: Since the winners of the 2016–17 Egypt Cup, Al Ahly, qualified for African competition based on league position, the spot awarded to the Cup winner (Confederation Cup) was given to the Cup runners-up, Al Masry.)
4	Al Masry	34	19	5	10	51	36	+15	62	Qualification for the Confederation Cup
5	Smouha	34	15	12	7	49	40	+9	57	
6	Ismaily	34	12	18	4	48	28	+20	54	
7	Tala'ea El Gaish	34	11	12	11	38	43	−5	45	
8	Al Ittihad	34	12	8	14	34	36	−2	44 (Note: Al Ittihad ahead of Al Mokawloon on head-to-head record; Al Ittihad–Al Mokawloon 3–1; Al Mokawloon–Al Ittihad 0–1.)	
9	Al Mokawloon	34	11	11	12	34	39	−5	44	
10	Petrojet	34	10	13	11	24	26	−2	43 (Note: Petrojet ahead of ENPPI on head-to-head away goal scored; ENPPI–Petrojet 1–1; Petrojet–ENPPI 0–0.)	
11	ENPPI	34	9	16	9	45	38	+7	43	
12	Wadi Degla	34	9	11	14	35	38	−3	38	
13	El Entag El Harby	34	7	12	15	32	40	−8	33	
14	El Dakhleya	34	7	10	17	31	52	−21	31 (Note: El Dakhleya ahead of Tanta on head-to-head record; Tanta–El Dakhleya 0–1; El Dakhleya–Tanta 1–0.)	
15	Tanta	34	7	10	17	21	39	−18	31	
16	Aswan (R)	34	6	11	17	28	49	−21	29	Relegation to the Second Division
17	Al Nasr Lel Taa'den (R)	34	7	5	22	27	66	−39	26	Relegation to the Second Division
18	El Sharkia (R)	34	5	8	21	24	48	−24	23	Relegation to the Second Division

Source: Soccerway
Rules for classification: 1) Points; 2) Head-to-Head points; 3) Head-to-Head goal difference; 4) Head-to-Head goal scored; 5) Head-to-Head away goal scored; 6) Goal difference; 7) Goal scored.
(C) Champions; (R) Relegated
Notes:

||team1=AHL||team2=ZMK||team3=SMO||team4=SFH||team5=ITTSAK||team6=ISM||team7=WDG||team8=MOK||team9=TLG||team10=MSR||team11=PTRJ||team12=ENP||team13=MKS||team14=ASW||team15=HRS||team16=SHRK||team17=NSRTA||team18=ASUT

=== Positions by round ===
The table lists the positions of teams after each week of matches. In order to preserve chronological evolvements, any postponed matches are not included in the round at which they were originally scheduled, but added to the full round they were played immediately afterwards. For example, if a match is scheduled for matchday 13, but then postponed and played between days 16 and 17, it will be added to the standings for day 16.

Team \ Round	1	2	3	4	5	6	7	8	9	10	11	12	13	14	15	16	17	18	19	20	21	22	23	24	25	26	27	28	29	30	31	32	33	34
Al Ahly	7	2	2	2	1	1	1	1	1	1	1	1	1	1	1	1	1	1	1	1	1	1	1	1	1	1	1	1	1	1	1	1	1	1
Misr Lel Makkasa	2	6	5	4	4	3	3	2	2	2	2	2	2	2	2	2	2	2	2	2	2	2	2	2	2	2	2	2	2	2	2	2	2	2
Zamalek	10	15	10	12	13	12	12	10	6	9	6	7	7	7	5	3	3	3	3	3	3	5	5	3	3	3	3	3	3	3	3	3	3	3
Al Masry	11	5	6	7	6	9	7	7	8	5	5	5	4	3	3	4	4	4	5	4	4	3	3	4	4	4	4	4	4	4	4	4	4	4
Smouha	5	1	1	1	2	2	2	3	4	4	3	3	3	4	4	5	5	5	4	5	5	4	4	5	5	5	5	5	5	5	5	5	5	5
Ismaily	13	10	9	8	7	11	11	8	10	10	10	10	11	11	9	8	9	10	9	11	9	10	10	9	10	8	8	8	7	7	6	6	6	6
Tala'ea El Gaish	6	8	8	6	8	6	6	6	5	7	7	6	6	6	7	6	6	6	7	6	7	7	7	6	7	9	10	9	9	9	9	8	7	7
Al Ittihad	3	7	4	3	5	4	5	5	7	6	8	8	8	9	10	10	11	9	11	9	11	8	9	8	9	7	7	7	6	6	7	7	8	8
Al Mokawloon	15	17	13	14	10	8	10	12	9	11	11	11	10	8	8	9	8	8	10	8	8	9	11	10	11	11	11	11	11	10	10	9	9	9
Petrojet	8	4	3	5	3	5	4	4	3	3	4	4	5	5	6	7	7	7	6	7	6	6	6	7	6	6	6	6	8	8	8	10	10	10
ENPPI	1	3	7	9	9	7	9	11	12	12	12	13	13	13	13	13	12	13	12	12	12	12	12	12	12	12	12	12	12	12	11	11	11	11
Wadi Degla	14	11	11	10	11	10	8	9	11	8	9	9	9	10	11	11	10	11	8	10	10	11	8	11	8	10	9	10	10	11	12	12	12	12
El Entag El Harby	9	16	17	16	15	15	15	13	13	14	13	12	12	12	12	12	13	12	13	13	13	13	13	14	14	14	13	13	13	13	13	13	13	13
El Dakhleya	16	14	16	17	16	16	16	14	14	15	14	14	14	14	15	15	14	14	15	15	15	15	16	15	16	16	17	16	16	16	16	17	15	14
Tanta	17	12	14	11	12	14	14	17	18	13	15	15	15	15	14	14	15	15	14	14	14	14	14	13	13	13	14	14	14	14	14	14	14	15
Aswan	4	9	12	13	14	13	13	16	16	17	18	17	17	17	18	16	16	16	16	16	16	16	15	16	15	15	16	15	15	15	15	16	17	16
Al Nasr Lel Taa'den	18	18	18	18	18	18	17	15	15	16	17	18	18	18	16	17	17	17	17	17	17	18	17	17	18	17	15	17	17	17	17	15	16	17
El Sharkia	12	13	15	15	17	17	18	18	17	18	16	16	16	16	17	18	18	18	18	18	18	17	18	18	17	18	18	18	18	18	18	18	18	18

Source: Soccerway

Leader
2018 CAF Champions League
2018 CAF Confederation Cup
Relegation to 2017–18 Egyptian Second Division

=== Results table ===
Home \ Away	AHL	ASW	DKH	ENP	ENT	ISM	ITH	MAS	MMK	MOK	NLT	PET	SHA	SMO	TGS	TNT	WDG	ZAM
Al Ahly	—	2–0	4–0	2–2	1–1	1–0	2–2	3–1	2–2	2–0	4–0	2–0	3–0	1–0	3–0	1–0	2–1	2–0
Aswan	0–2	—	2–0	1–1	1–1	2–3	0–1	1–2	1–3	1–0	1–2	1–1	1–1	2–0	1–0	1–1	2–0	0–0
El Dakhleya	0–2	1–1	—	1–0	3–0	2–2	1–2	2–4	1–2	0–0	0–1	1–1	1–0	0–1	2–3	1–0	0–0	3–4
ENPPI	0–0	3–0	0–1	—	0–0	0–0	3–0	0–2	3–3	1–2	1–1	1–1	2–2	1–3	2–0	3–1	1–1	1–2
El Entag El Harby	0–2	1–1	0–0	1–1	—	1–1	2–2	0–1	1–2	0–2	2–1	0–1	0–0	0–1	0–1	3–0	1–5	0–1
Ismaily	0–0	5–0	3–0	2–1	1–0	—	1–1	2–1	1–2	1–1	1–1	2–0	3–0	2–2	1–1	0–0	1–1	0–0
Al Ittihad	0–1	3–3	3–0	0–0	0–1	0–1	—	1–1	1–1	3–1	1–0	1–2	1–0	0–1	3–2	1–0	0–1	0–2
Al Masry	1–1	3–1	2–1	1–3	2–1	1–1	1–0	—	0–1	1–1	2–0	1–0	1–0	1–1	1–2	4–0	1–0	0–1
Misr Lel Makkasa	0–1	2–0	1–0	3–0	2–1	3–2	1–3	4–2	—	2–0	4–1	2–1	2–1	3–4	1–0	3–0	0–1	1–0
Al Mokawloon	0–2	1–1	2–2	0–0	1–0	2–2	0–1	1–2	0–2	—	2–1	1–0	2–1	1–1	0–1	1–0	1–0	1–2
Al Nasr Lel Taa'den	0–3	0–1	2–2	0–4	0–3	1–5	2–0	1–4	0–4	0–2	—	1–2	2–1	0–1	0–2	0–1	2–1	0–2
Petrojet	0–0	2–0	1–0	0–0	1–1	1–1	0–1	1–2	1–0	0–0	0–1	—	1–0	2–2	1–1	2–0	1–0	0–2
El Sharkia	1–1	3–2	2–0	0–1	0–3	0–1	1–0	0–1	1–2	1–0	2–3	0–0	—	1–2	0–0	0–1	1–2	1–0
Smouha	2–4	1–0	2–2	2–2	1–1	2–1	0–0	1–2	2–0	3–3	2–1	1–0	2–0	—	1–2	3–2	1–1	2–0
Tala'ea El Gaish	1–2	0–0	1–1	1–2	1–3	1–1	2–1	2–1	1–1	1–1	2–2	0–1	2–2	1–0	—	1–1	1–1	2–3
Tanta	0–1	1–0	0–1	1–1	1–0	0–1	0–1	2–1	0–0	1–3	1–1	0–0	2–2	2–0	1–2	—	0–0	0–0
Wadi Degla	0–1	2–0	1–2	4–3	2–2	0–0	1–0	0–1	2–4	1–2	1–0	0–0	2–0	2–2	0–1	0–2	—	1–1
Zamalek	0–2	1–0	3–0	0–2	1–2	0–0	2–1	1–0	0–2	3–0	2–0	1–0	2–0	0–0	3–0	1–0	2–1	—

Source: Soccerway
Legend: Blue = home team win; Yellow = draw; Red = away team win.

== Season statistics ==
=== Top goalscorers ===
Rank	Player	Club	Goals
1	(Egypt) Ahmed El Sheikh	Misr Lel Makkasa	17
2	(Democratic Republic of the Congo) Kabongo Kasongo	Al Ittihad	12
3	(Ghana) John Antwi	Al Ahly (1); Misr Lel Makkasa (10)	11
3	(Egypt) Ahmed Gomaa	Al Masry	11
3	(Ethiopia) Oumed Oukri	El Entag El Harby	11
6	(Ghana) Benjamin Acheampong	El Dakhleya	10
6	(Egypt) Amr Marey	ENPPI	10
6	(Egypt) Abdallah Said	Al Ahly	10
9	(Ghana) Nana Poku†	Misr Lel Makkasa	9
9	(Egypt) Ahmed Raouf	Smouha	9
9	(Egypt) Walid Soliman	Al Ahly	9

†Nana Poku moved to UAE Arabian Gulf League side Al Shabab during the January transfer window.

=== Top assists ===
Rank	Player	Club	Assists
1	(Egypt) Ibrahim Hassan	Ismaily	9
2	(Egypt) Ahmed Fathy	Al Ahly	8
2	(Egypt) Ahmed Gomaa	Al Masry	8
2	(Egypt) Abdallah Said	Al Ahly	8
2	(Egypt) Ahmed Samir	El Dakhleya	8
6	(Egypt) Ahmed El Sheikh	Misr Lel Makkasa	7
7	(Egypt) Mahmoud Shikabala	Zamalek	6
7	(Egypt) Ahmed Shoukry	Al Masry	6
7	(Egypt) Ahmed Temsah	Smouha	6

=== Hat-tricks ===
Player	Club	Against	Result	Date
(Egypt) Abdallah Said	Al Ahly	Al Nasr Lel Taa'den	4–0	8 May 2017
(Ghana) John Antwi	Misr Lel Makkasa	Al Nasr Lel Taa'den	4–1	29 June 2017
