= ACCC =

ACCC may refer to:

== Industry ==
- ACCC conductor, Aluminium Conductor Composite Core, high voltage power line cables

== Education ==
- Association of Canadian Community Colleges, a national association formed in 1972
- Atlantic Cape Community College, an accredited, co-educational, two-year, public, community college

== Sports ==
- Alabama Community College Conference, the athletic conference of the community colleges in Alabama
- Hockey Africa Cup for Club Champions, a men's field hockey competition for clubs in Africa
- Hockey Africa Cup for Club Champions (women), a women's field hockey competition for clubs in Africa

== Law ==
- Australian Competition and Consumer Commission, an independent Australian Commonwealth government authority established in 1995
- Aarhus Convention Compliance Committee, the body ensuring compliance with the Aarhus Convention on access to information, public participation in decision-making and access to justice in environmental matters

== Religion ==
- American Council of Christian Churches, a national council of churches
- Anglican Catholic Church of Canada, an Anglican church that was founded in the 1970s by conservative Anglicans
- The Australian Centre for Christianity and Culture, a Christian ecumenical centre

== Other uses ==
- Adams County Correctional Center, a private prison
- Arthur J.E. Child Comprehensive Cancer Centre, a hospital
- Americas Counter Cartel Coalition, a military alliance between states in the Americas

== See also ==
- A3C (disambiguation)
- AC3 (disambiguation)
- AC (disambiguation)
