= 2015–16 Egyptian Second Division =

Egyptian Second Division
- Season: 2015–16
- Dates: 29 October 2015 – 21 April 2016
- Promoted: Al Nasr Lel Taa'en; El Sharkia; Tanta
- Relegated: Group A: Asyut Petroleum Ras Gharib Al Maragha Gharb Sohel; Group B: Beni Mazar MS Ebshway MS Samalout; Group C: Mit Khakan Egypt Insurance Sokar El Hawamdia; Group D: Port Fouad MS Abou Souyer Ghazl Port Said Al Rebat & Al Anwar; Group E: El Senbellawein Samanoud Sers El Layan Kahraba Talkha; Group F: Maleyat Kafr El Zayat Abou Qir Fertilizers Shabab El Daba'a
- Matches: 609
- Goals: 1,603 (2.63 per match)
- Biggest home win: Damietta 7–0 Ghazl Port Said (29 November 2015)
- Biggest away win: Sokar El Hawamdia 2–10 FC Masr (3 April 2016)
- Highest scoring: Sokar El Hawamdia 2–10 FC Masr (3 April 2016); Al Maragha 9–3 Gharb Sohel (10 April 2016)

The 2015–16 Egyptian Second Division was the 36th edition of the Egyptian Second Division, the top Egyptian semi-professional level for football clubs, since its establishment in 1977. The season began on 29 October 2015 and concluded on 21 April 2016.

Al Nasr Lel Taa'en, El Sharkia and Tanta won the Promotion play-offs and secured the promotion to the 2016–17 Egyptian Premier League.

== Teams ==
=== Group A ===
Club	City
Al Aluminium	Nag Hammadi
Asyut Petroleum	Asyut
Gharb Sohel	Sohel Island
El Gouna	El Gouna
Al Madina Al Monawara	Luxor
Al Maragha	Al Maragha
Al Nasr Lel Taa'den	Aswan
Qena	Qena
Ras Gharib	Ras Gharib
Sohag	Sohag
Tahta	Tahta

=== Group B ===
Club	City
Al Assiouty Sport	Asyut
Beni Mazar	Beni Mazar
Beni Suef	Beni Suef
Dayrout	Dayrout
Fayoum	Fayoum
El Minya	El Minya
MS Ebshway	El Gharbia
MS Samalout	Samalout
MS Tamya	Tamya
Telephonat Beni Suef	Beni Suef
Al Wasta	Beni Suef

=== Group C ===
Club	City
Eastern Company	Giza
Egypt Insurance	Cairo
FC Masr	Cairo
Mit Khakan	El Monufia
Al Nasr	Cairo
National Bank	Giza
Nogoom El Mostakbal	Giza
Sokar El Hawamdia	Giza
El Sekka El Hadid	Cairo
Telecom Egypt	Cairo
Tersana	Giza

=== Group D ===
Club	City
Damietta	Damietta
Ghazl Port Said	Port Said
Al Merreikh	Port Said
MS Abou Souyer	Ismailia
Manshiyat El Shohada	Ismailia
Port Fouad	Port Said
El Qanah	Ismailia
Al Rebat & Al Anwar	Port Said
El Sharkia	El Sharkia
Suez	Suez
Al Zarka	Al Zarka

=== Group E ===
Club	City
Baladeyet El Mahalla	El Mahalla
Dikernis	Dikernis
Gomhoriat Shebin	Shebin El Koum
Kahraba Talkha	Talkha
El Mansoura	El Mansoura
Samanoud	Samanoud
El Senbellawein	El Senbellawein
Sherbeen	Sherbeen
Said El Mahalla	El Mahalla
Sers El Layan	Shebin El Koum
Tanta	Tanta

=== Group F ===
Club	City
Ala'ab Damanhour	Damanhour
Abou Qir Fertilizers	Abou Qir
Badr	El Beheira
Al Hammam	Al Hammam
Kafr El Sheikh	Kafr El Sheikh
Maleyat Kafr El Zayat	El Gharbia
MS Koum Hamada	El Beheira
Olympic Club	Alexandria
Pharco	Alexandria
El Raja	Marsa Matruh
Shabab El Daba'a	El Daba'a

== Standings ==
=== Group A ===
Pos	Team	Pld	W	D	L	GF	GA	GD	Pts	Promotion, qualification or relegation
1	Al Nasr Lel Taa'den (O, P)	20	11	7	2	33	15	+18	40 (Note: Head-to-head results: Al Nasr Lel Taa'den 1–0 Al Aluminium, Al Aluminium 2–2 Al Nasr Lel Taa'den.)	Qualification to promotion play-offs
2	Al Aluminium	20	11	7	2	33	17	+16	40	
3	Qena	20	10	5	5	35	20	+15	35	
4	El Gouna	20	9	6	5	24	15	+9	33	
5	Al Madina Al Monawara	20	8	7	5	24	14	+10	31 (Note: Head-to-head results: Al Madina Al Monawara 0–0 Tahta, Tahta 0–1 Al Madina Al Monawara.)	
6	Tahta	20	9	4	7	21	23	−2	31	
7	Sohag	20	7	5	8	21	19	+2	26	
8	Asyut Petroleum (R)	20	6	1	13	15	31	−16	19	Qualification to Relegation play-offs
9	Ras Gharib (R)	20	5	3	12	14	33	−19	18	Relegation to the Third Division
10	Al Maragha (R)	20	4	5	11	20	29	−9	17	Relegation to the Third Division
11	Gharb Sohel (R)	20	2	6	12	16	40	−24	12	Relegation to the Third Division

Source: Kooora
Rules for classification: 1) Points; 2) Head-to-Head points; 3) Head-to-Head goal difference; 4) Head-to-Head goal scored; 5) Head-to-Head away goal scored; 6) Goal difference; 7) Goal scored.
(O) Play-off winners; (P) Promoted; (R) Relegated

=== Group B ===
Pos	Team	Pld	W	D	L	GF	GA	GD	Pts	Promotion, qualification or relegation
1	Al Assiouty Sport	20	16	2	2	40	15	+25	50	Qualification to promotion play-offs
2	El Minya	20	13	5	2	41	17	+24	44	
3	Beni Suef	20	11	5	4	40	26	+14	38	
4	MS Tamya	20	8	3	9	27	28	−1	27	
5	Fayoum	20	6	8	6	18	23	−5	26	
6	Dayrout	20	6	7	7	26	24	+2	25	
7	Telephonat Beni Suef	20	5	8	7	26	25	+1	23 (Note: Head-to-head record: Telephonat Beni Suef 7 pts, Al Wasta 5 pts, Beni Mazar 4 pts.)	
8	Al Wasta (O)	20	6	5	9	23	33	−10	23	Qualification to Relegation play-offs
9	Beni Mazar (R)	20	6	5	9	34	45	−11	23	Relegation to the Third Division
10	MS Ebshway (R)	20	2	8	10	15	31	−16	14	Relegation to the Third Division
11	MS Samalout (R)	20	0	6	14	15	38	−23	6	Relegation to the Third Division

Source: Kooora
Rules for classification: 1) Points; 2) Head-to-Head points; 3) Head-to-Head goal difference; 4) Head-to-Head goal scored; 5) Head-to-Head away goal scored; 6) Goal difference; 7) Goal scored.
(O) Play-off winners; (R) Relegated

=== Group C ===
Pos	Team	Pld	W	D	L	GF	GA	GD	Pts	Promotion, qualification or relegation
1	Tersana	20	14	2	4	34	16	+18	44	Qualification to promotion play-offs
2	FC Masr	20	13	4	3	35	12	+23	43	
3	Al Nasr	20	10	6	4	31	15	+16	36	
4	Nogoom El Mostakbal	20	9	5	6	27	21	+6	32	
5	Eastern Company	20	8	6	6	32	28	+4	30	
6	National Bank	20	7	6	7	23	23	0	27	
7	El Sekka El Hadid	20	6	7	7	29	29	0	25	
8	Telecom Egypt (O)	20	5	6	9	25	37	−12	21	Qualification to Relegation play-offs
9	Mit Khakan (R)	20	4	7	9	20	28	−8	19	Relegation to the Third Division
10	Egypt Insurance (R)	20	4	6	10	27	32	−5	18	Relegation to the Third Division
11	Sokar El Hawamdia (R)	20	1	3	16	16	58	−42	6	Relegation to the Third Division

Source: Kooora
Rules for classification: 1) Points; 2) Head-to-Head points; 3) Head-to-Head goal difference; 4) Head-to-Head goal scored; 5) Head-to-Head away goal scored; 6) Goal difference; 7) Goal scored.
(O) Play-off winners; (R) Relegated

=== Group D ===
Pos	Team	Pld	W	D	L	GF	GA	GD	Pts	Promotion, qualification or relegation
1	El Sharkia (O, P)	20	16	2	2	36	16	+20	50	Qualification to promotion play-offs
2	Damietta	20	15	3	2	36	9	+27	48	
3	Suez	20	11	7	2	36	12	+24	40	
4	El Qanah	20	10	8	2	33	15	+18	38	
5	Al Merreikh	20	8	4	8	26	23	+3	28	
6	Al Zarka	20	7	5	8	18	18	0	26	
7	Manshiyat El Shohada	20	5	5	10	18	30	−12	20	
8	Port Fouad (R)	20	5	4	11	19	25	−6	19	Qualification to Relegation play-offs
9	MS Abou Souyer (R)	20	4	4	12	8	20	−12	16	Relegation to the Third Division
10	Ghazl Port Said (R)	20	3	2	15	12	41	−29	11 (Note: Head-to-head results: Ghazl Port Said 0–1 Al Rebat & Al Anwar, Al Rebat & Al Anwar 0–3 Ghazl Port Said (tied on head-to-head results, ranked on head-to-head goal difference).)	Relegation to the Third Division
11	Al Rebat & Al Anwar (R)	20	3	2	15	9	42	−33	11	Relegation to the Third Division

Source: Kooora
Rules for classification: 1) Points; 2) Head-to-Head points; 3) Head-to-Head goal difference; 4) Head-to-Head goal scored; 5) Head-to-Head away goal scored; 6) Goal difference; 7) Goal scored.
(O) Play-off winners; (P) Promoted; (R) Relegated

=== Group E ===
Pos	Team	Pld	W	D	L	GF	GA	GD	Pts	Promotion, qualification or relegation
1	Tanta (O, P)	20	12	6	2	38	14	+24	42	Qualification to promotion play-offs
2	El Mansoura	20	8	11	1	30	15	+15	35	
3	Baladeyet El Mahalla	20	7	11	2	31	18	+13	32	
4	Said El Mahalla	20	7	8	5	23	18	+5	29	
5	Dikernis	20	7	7	6	17	18	−1	28 (Note: Head-to-head results: Dikernis 1–0 Sherbeen, Sherbeen 0–0 Dikernis.)	
6	Sherbeen	20	7	7	6	19	22	−3	28	
7	Gomhoriat Shebin	20	6	9	5	30	26	+4	27	
8	El Senbellawein (R)	20	5	9	6	16	24	−8	24	Qualification to Relegation play-offs
9	Samanoud (R)	20	4	4	12	19	38	−19	16	Relegation to the Third Division
10	Sers El Layan (R)	20	2	9	9	19	33	−14	15	Relegation to the Third Division
11	Kahraba Talkha (R)	20	1	7	12	16	32	−16	10	Relegation to the Third Division

Source: Kooora
Rules for classification: 1) Points; 2) Head-to-Head points; 3) Head-to-Head goal difference; 4) Head-to-Head goal scored; 5) Head-to-Head away goal scored; 6) Goal difference; 7) Goal scored.
(O) Play-off winners; (P) Promoted; (R) Relegated

=== Group F ===
Pos	Team	Pld	W	D	L	GF	GA	GD	Pts	Promotion, qualification or relegation
1	Ala'ab Damanhour	20	14	2	4	23	11	+12	44	Qualification to promotion play-offs
2	Pharco	20	12	6	2	39	14	+25	42	
3	Olympic Club	20	10	2	8	19	17	+2	32	
4	El Raja	20	9	4	7	19	14	+5	31	
5	Badr	20	8	4	8	18	21	−3	28	
6	MS Koum Hamada	20	7	6	7	23	17	+6	27	
7	Kafr El Sheikh	20	6	8	6	20	24	−4	26	
8	Al Hammam (O)	20	5	8	7	16	19	−3	23	Qualification to Relegation play-offs
9	Maleyat Kafr El Zayat (R)	20	5	6	9	18	26	−8	21	Relegation to the Third Division
10	Abou Qir Fertilizers (R)	20	2	9	9	9	19	−10	15	Relegation to the Third Division
11	Shabab El Daba'a (R)	20	3	3	14	20	42	−22	12	Relegation to the Third Division

Source: Kooora
Rules for classification: 1) Points; 2) Head-to-Head points; 3) Head-to-Head goal difference; 4) Head-to-Head goal scored; 5) Head-to-Head away goal scored; 6) Goal difference; 7) Goal scored.
(O) Play-off winners; (R) Relegated

== Play-offs ==
=== Promotion play-offs ===
==== Summary ====
The first legs were played on 16 April, and the second legs were played on 21 April 2016.

Team 1	Agg.	Team 2	1st leg	2nd leg
Al Nasr Lel Taa'den	2–2 (3–2 p)	Al Assiouty Sport	1–1	1–1
Tersana	0–0 (5–6 p)	El Sharkia	0–0	0–0
Tanta	1–0	Ala'ab Damanhour	1–0	0–0

==== Matches ====
16 April 2016
15:30 CAT

Al Nasr Lel Taa'den	1–1	Al Assiouty Sport
Nasser 44'		Salah 17'

Al Nasr Lel Taa'den Stadium, Aswan
Referee: Mahmoud Ashour
21 April 2016
15:30 CAT

Al Assiouty Sport	1–1	Al Nasr Lel Taa'den
Teddy 82' (pen.)		El Feil 90+6' (pen.)
Penalties
El Balat (penalty missed); Abdel Moneam (penalty scored); Gamal (penalty missed); Teddy (penalty scored); El Masry (penalty missed)	2–3	(penalty missed) H. Mohamed; (penalty missed) Nasser; (penalty scored) M. Mohamed; (penalty scored) El Feil; (penalty scored) Yehia

Al Assiouty Sport Stadium, Asyut
Referee: Samir Osman

2–2 on aggregate. Al Nasr Lel Taa'den won 3–2 on penalties and promoted to the Egyptian Premier League.

16 April 2016
15:30 CAT

Tersana	0–0	El Sharkia

Banha Stadium, Banha
Referee: Ibrahim Nour El Din
21 April 2016
15:30 CAT

El Sharkia	0–0	Tersana
Penalties
Kamal (penalty scored); T. Ibrahim (penalty scored); Salam (penalty scored); Saleh (penalty missed); Rambo (penalty scored); Fawzy (penalty scored); Hanafy (penalty missed); Farouka (penalty scored)	6–5	(penalty scored) Nasser; (penalty scored) Salah; (penalty scored) Omar; (penalty missed) El Fayoumy; (penalty scored) A. Ibrahim; (penalty scored) Said; (penalty missed) Gaber; (penalty missed) Hesham

Zagazig Stadium, Zagazig
Referee: Gehad Grisha

0–0 on aggregate. El Sharkia won 6–5 on penalties and promoted to the Egyptian Premier League.

16 April 2016
15:30 CAT

Tanta	1–0	Ala'ab Damanhour
El Sheikh 27'

Tanta Stadium, Tanta
Referee: Mahmoud El Banna
21 April 2016
15:30 CAT

Ala'ab Damanhour	0–0	Tanta

Ala'ab Damanhour Stadium, Damanhour
Referee: Mohamed Farouk

Tanta won 1–0 on aggregate and promoted to the Egyptian Premier League.

=== Relegation play-offs ===
==== Summary ====
The matches were played on 17 and 21 April 2016.

Team 1	Score	Team 2
Asyut Petroleum	1–2	Al Wasta
Telecom Egypt	1–0	Port Fouad
El Senbellawein	0–1	Al Hammam

==== Matches ====
17 April 2016
15:30 CAT

El Senbellawein	0–1	Al Hammam
		Abou Hadid 82'

Ala'ab Damanhour Stadium, Damanhour
Referee: Mohamed El Hanafy

El Senbellawein relegated to the Egyptian Third Division.

17 April 2016
15:30 CAT

Telecom Egypt	1–0	Port Fouad
Farouk 86' (pen.)

Suez Canal Stadium, Ismailia
Referee: Mahmoud Bassiouny

Port Fouad relegated to the Egyptian Third Division.

21 April 2016
15:30 CAT

Asyut Petroleum	1–2	Al Wasta
Fouad 75' (pen.)		M'Bomo 22'; Ragab 65' (pen.)

Fayoum Stadium, Fayoum
Referee: Mohamed Marouf

Asyut Petroleum relegated to the Egyptian Third Division.
