= Football in Egypt =

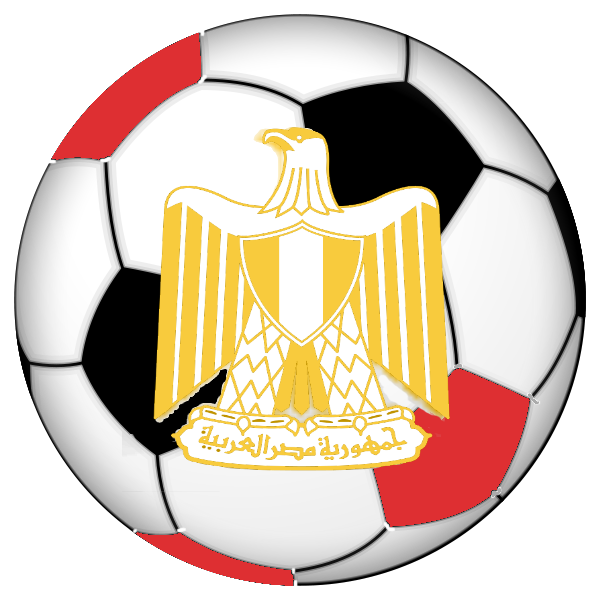
- Country: Egypt
- Governing body: Egyptian Football Association
- National team: Men’s National Team

Club competitions
- Egyptian Premier League; Egypt Cup; Egyptian League Cup; Egyptian Super Cup

International competitions
- Champions League; CAF Confederation Cup; Super Cup; FIFA Club World Cup; FIFA World Cup (National Team); Africa Cup of Nations (National Team)

Football is the most popular sport in Egypt, many Egyptians gather around to watch various Egyptian clubs and the Egyptian national football team play on an almost daily basis. Around 60% of the Egyptians are football fans.

Zamalek and Al Ahly are amongst the most popular in the country, both of which are based in Cairo. Both teams compete in the Egyptian Premier League, the highest tier of Egyptian football. These two teams compete in the Cairo Derby. Other notable teams include: Ismaily, Al-Masry, Al Ittihad.

== History ==
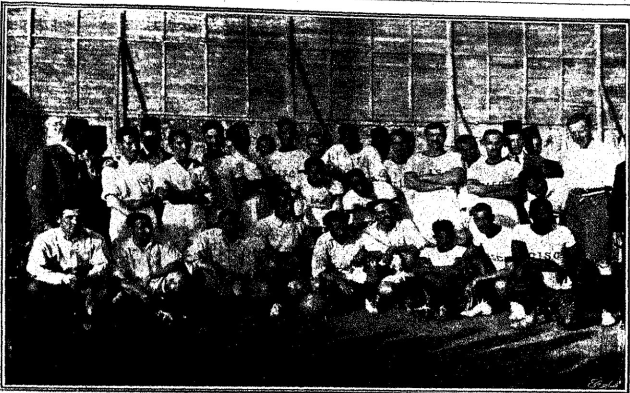
Zamalek SC squad in 1917, the first Egyptian club to participate in Sultan Hussein Cup, and the first Egyptian club to win the title in 1921.

The first official football tournament was the Sultan Hussein Cup, which was launched in 1917. Zamalek was the only Egyptian club to participate in the tournament as a sign of resistance to the British and a way to display the Egyptian presence in the sport. Zamalek eventually won the cup in 1921. This encouraged other Egyptian clubs to participate including Al Ahly which initially refused to take part, but in 1918, they decided to take part.

=== Egypt Cup ===
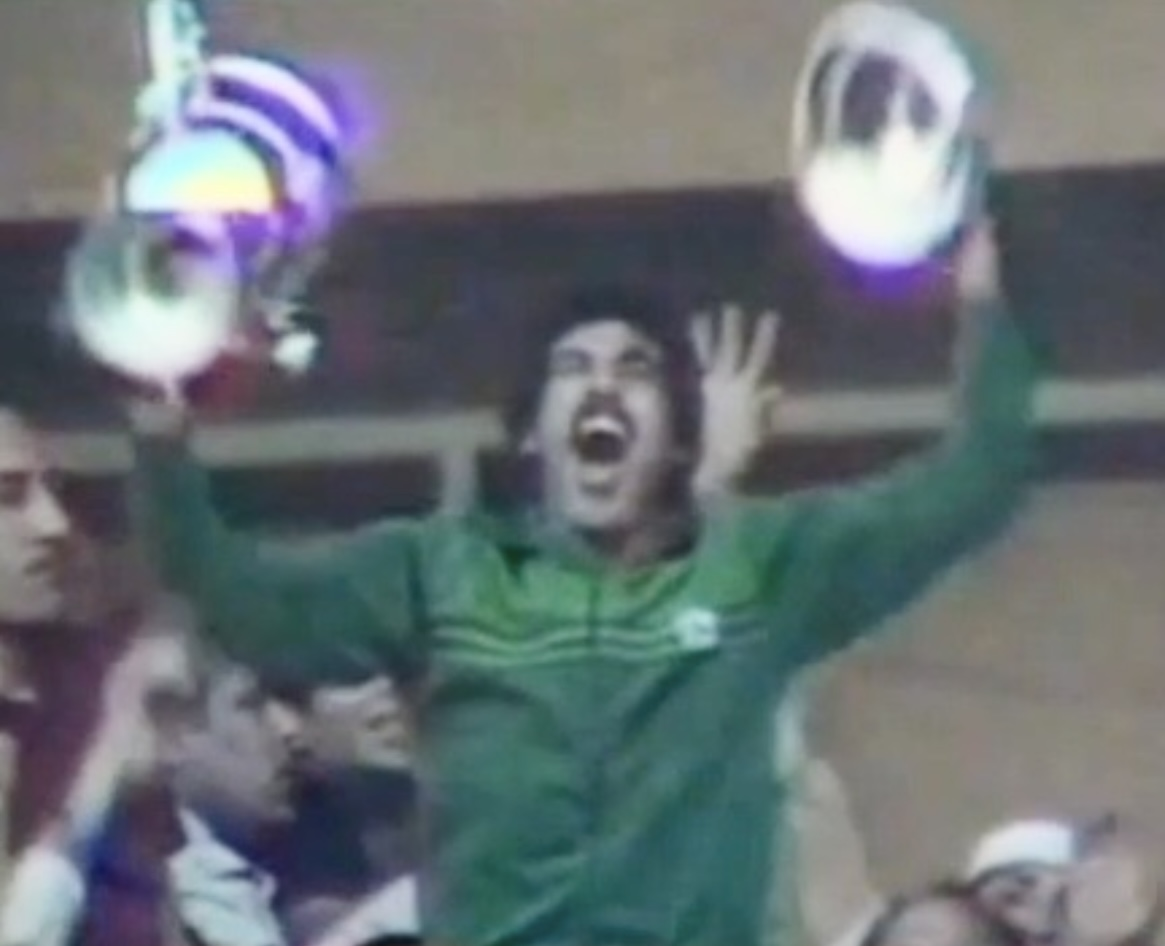
Hassan Shehata lifting the Egypt Cup trophy with Zamalek SC in 1979

The Egypt Cup is the oldest tournament in the history of Egyptian football that is still being held to-date. It is the first association football championship to be organized by the Egyptian Football Association. The first local football tournament in Egypt was the Sultan Hussein Cup. The first team to win the Egypt Cup was Zamalek in 1922.

The tournament was not played between 1967 and 1971 due to the outbreak of the War of Attrition. It was also canceled in the 1973–74 season due to the outbreak of the October War. The tournament was canceled in 1979-80, 1986–87 and 1993–94 seasons due to several reasons, and was canceled in the 1981-82 edition due to Zamalek’s dispute with the Football Association. The cup was also canceled in the 2011-12 season after the Port Said Stadium riot.

=== Egyptian Premier League ===
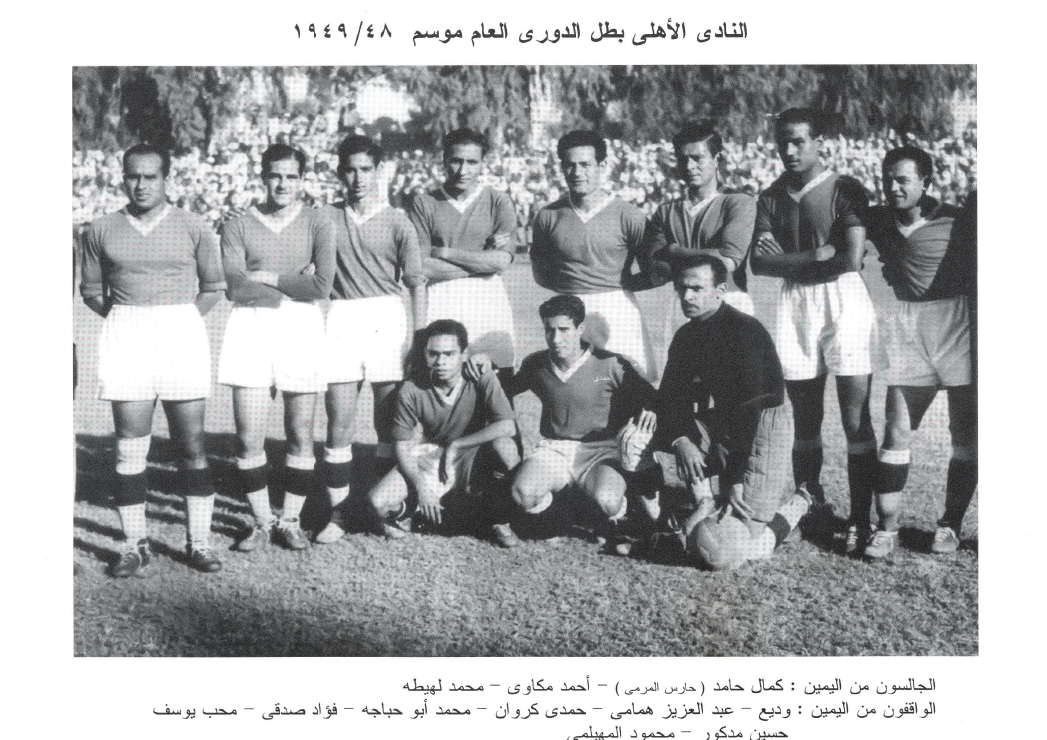
Al Ahly SC squad, winners of the first league in 1948–49 season.

The Egyptian Premier League (League A) has eighteen teams. There is no official English translation or title for the Egyptian League. Due to Sponsorships the official name of the league is the WE Premier League. The league was also called Vodafone Premier League back in the 2006/2007 for the same reasons.

== National football team's achievements ==
The Egypt national football team, also known under the nickname of The Pharaohs, is, as their name states, the national team of Egypt and is administered by the Egyptian Football Association. The team was founded in 1921, although a team had been fielded in the 1920 Summer Olympics.

Internationally, Egypt is the first country in the world outside Europe and the Americas to participate in the Olympics and the FIFA World Cup. The Egyptians qualified to 13 Olympic Games (an African record), as well as 4 World Cups. Egypt’s first Olympic football participation came in 1920 Antwerp, while the first World Cup participation was in the 1934 edition.

Egypt achieved the 4th place at 3 Olympics in 1928 Amsterdam, 1964 Tokyo, and 2024 Paris. The Egyptians have also reached the Quarter-finals of Olympic football at 5 other editions. Moreover, Egypt earned the honour of becoming a bronze medalist at the 2001 FIFA U-20 World Cup in Argentina.

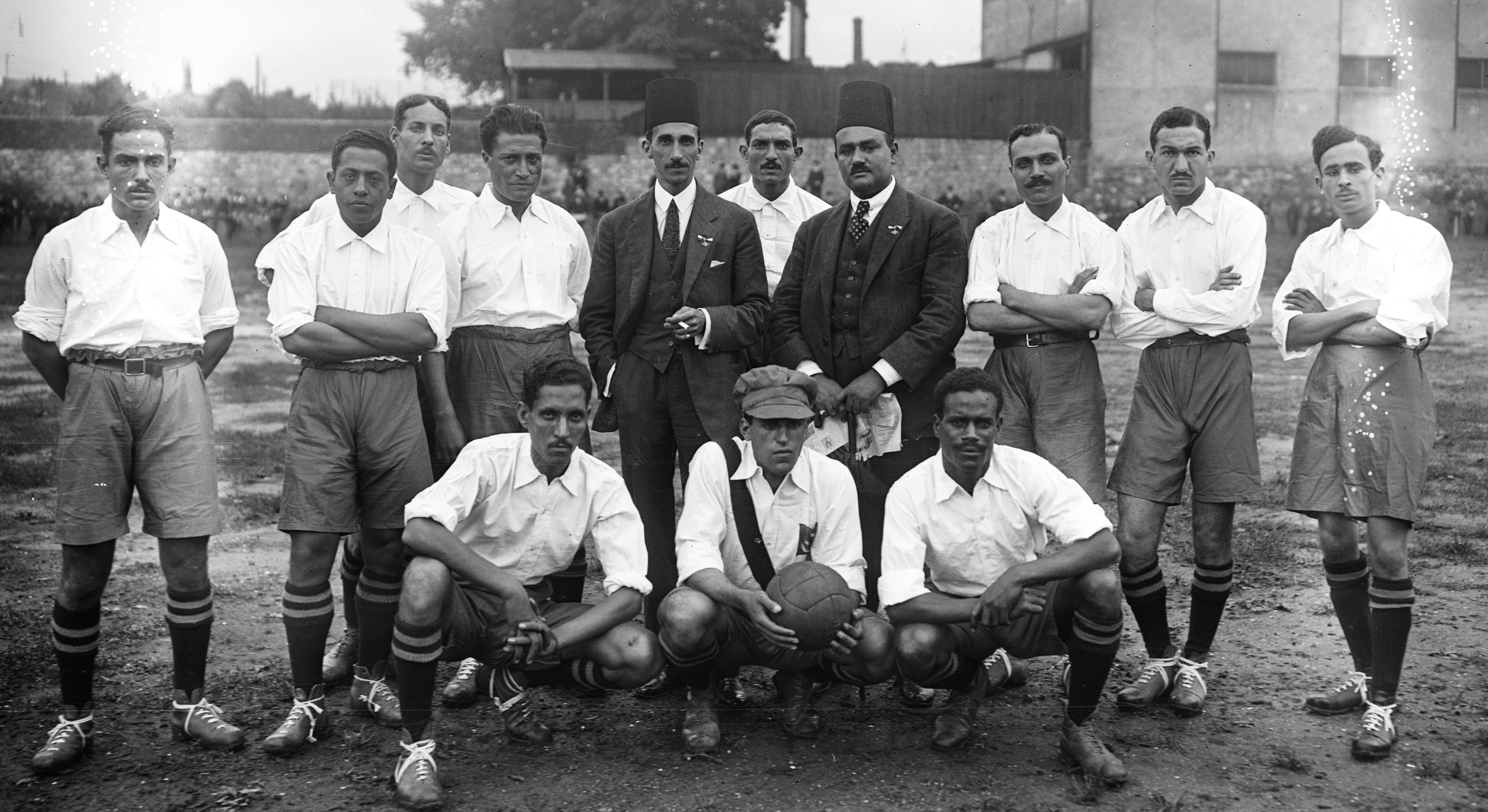
Egyptian Olympic football team at the 1920 Summer Olympics

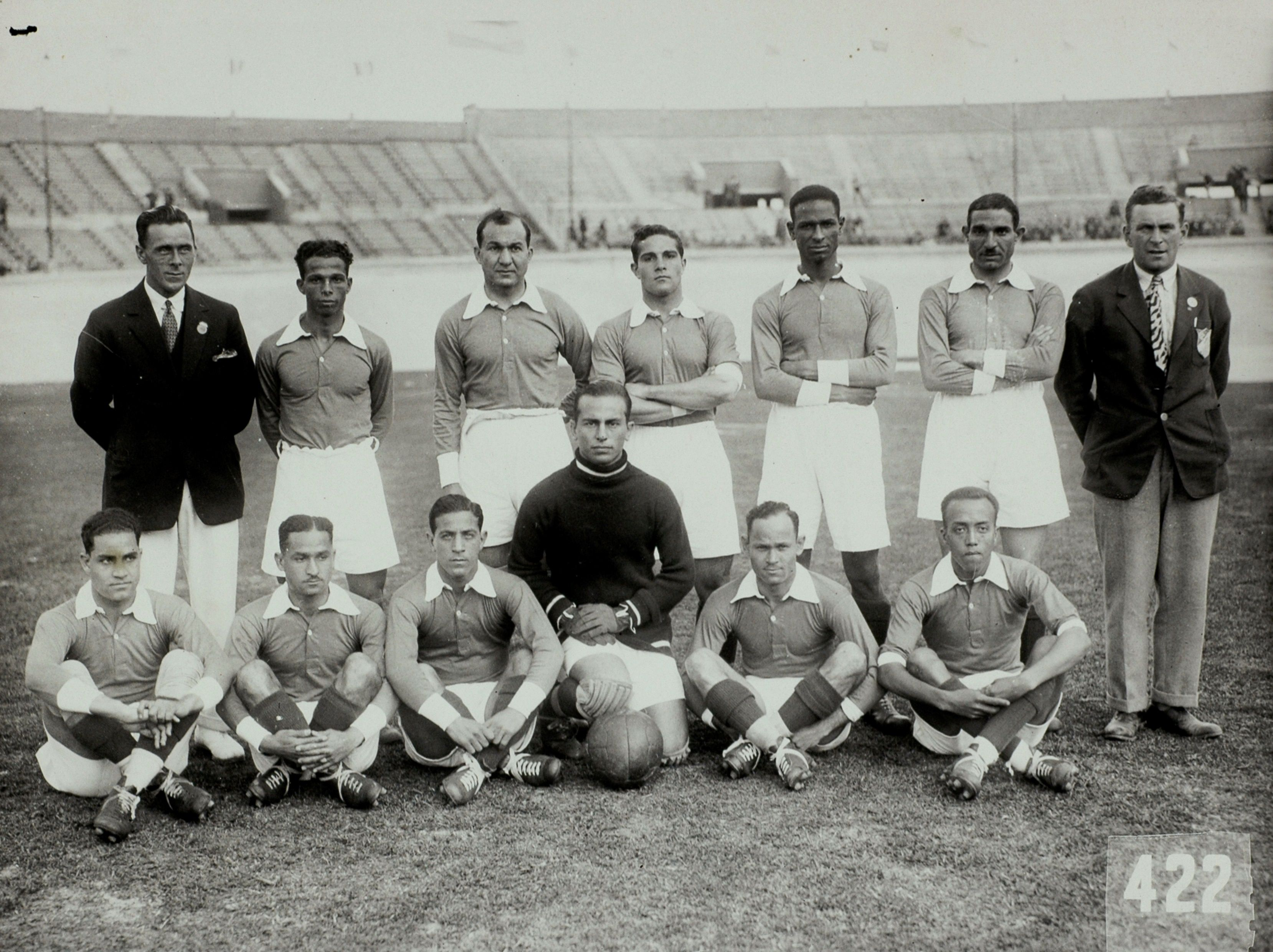
Egyptian Olympic football team, 4th of the World at 1928 Summer Olympics

Egypt has won multiple cups over the years. They won the African Cup of Nations 7 times. Egypt won the inaugural Cup in 1957, 1959, 1986, 1998, 2006, 2008 and 2010, making them record holders of most African cup wins and most wins in a row (for winning 3 times in a row).

Their highest FIFA ranking was in July 2010 where they were ranked 9th in the world, making it their greatest achievement. They were the first from an African country and also, from an Arab country to participate in the World Cup when they played in 1934, losing to Hungary 4-2.

Egypt played their second World Cup in 1990, where they didn't pass through the first stage after tying Ireland, Netherlands and losing to England 1-0.

Egypt Qualified for the 2018 World Cup which was the first time in 28 years. They were placed in Group A with hosts Russia, Uruguay and KSA. Egypt lost to Uruguay in the 90th minute and then lost 3-1 to Russia and scored the goal Mohamed Salah from a penalty in the last game against Saudi Arabia, Egypt lost 2-1 and scored the goal Mohamed Salah in the 22nd minute.

=== Africa ===
- Africa Cup of Nations

Winners (7): 1957, 1959, 1986, 1998, 2006, 2008, 2010 (Most successful team)
Runners-up (2): 1962, 2017, 2022
Third place (3): 1963, 1970, 1974
Fourth place (3): 1976, 1980, 1984

- All-Africa Games

Champions (2): 1987, 1995
Third place (1): 1973

- Afro-Asian Cup of Nations

Runners-up (2): 1988, 2007

- Nile Basin Tournament

Champions (1): 2011 (Most successful team)

=== Other ===
- Egypt won the 1955 Mediterranean games. They were also runners up in the 1951 tournament.
- Egypt's best achievement in the Olympics was 4th place in 1928 Amsterdam, 1964 Tokyo, and 2024 Paris.
- In 2014, Egypt was one of the eight nations to take part in the first Unity World Cup.
- They have won the Pan-Arab Games 4 times, the Arab Cup in 1992 and the Palestine Cup twice.

== Stadiums ==
Egypt has a total of 27 football stadiums spread around the country. The main stadium is the Cairo International Stadium, where the national team play all of their matches, while Egypt's largest football stadium is Misr Stadium in The New Capital. The second most used stadium is the Borg El Arab Stadium in Alexandria which is primarily used by Ittihad Alexandria and the B team of the national team. The reason that this stadium was built was for Egypt's bid for the 2010 FIFA World Cup.

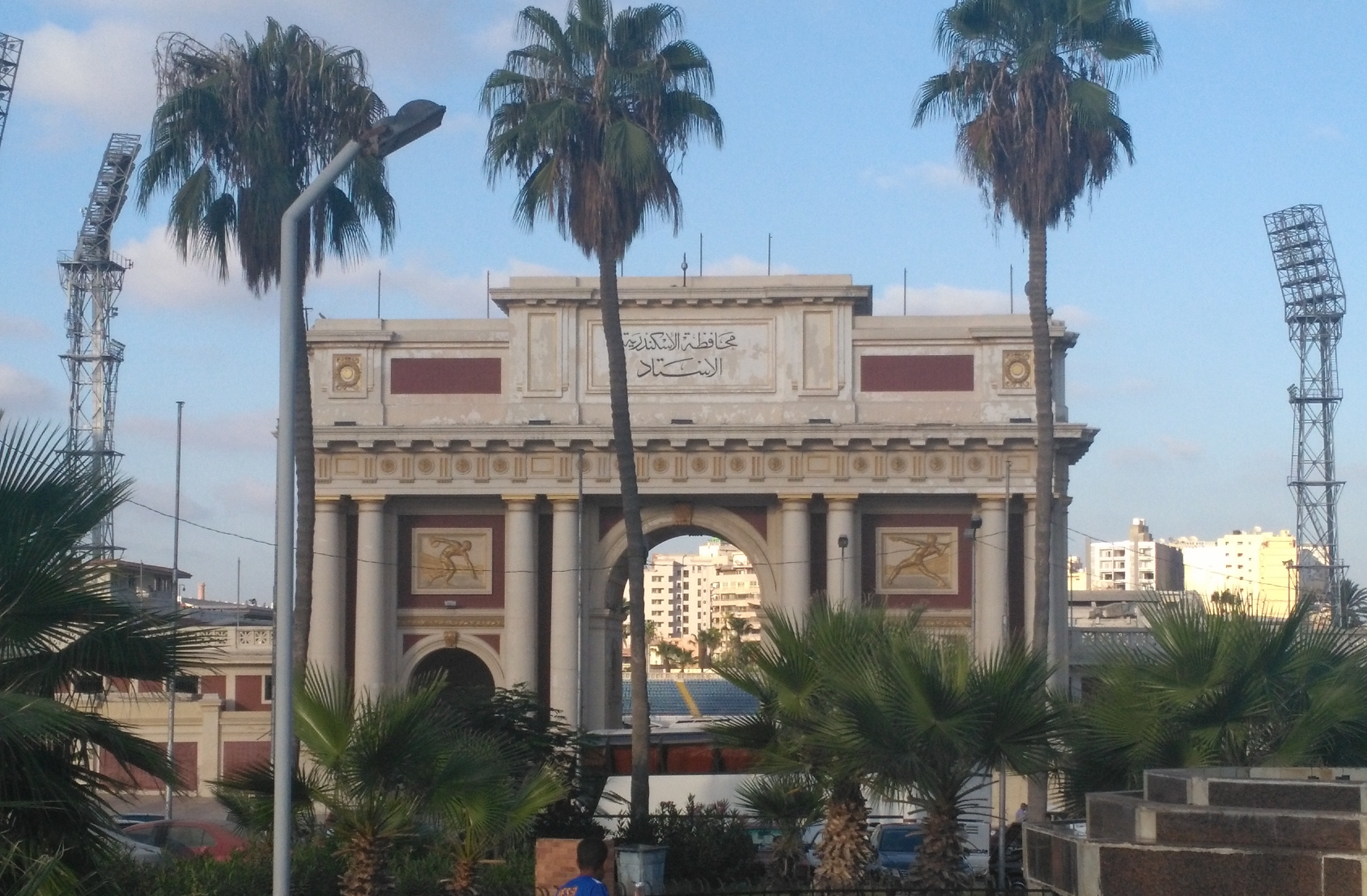
The Alexandria Stadium, the oldest stadium in Egypt and Africa.

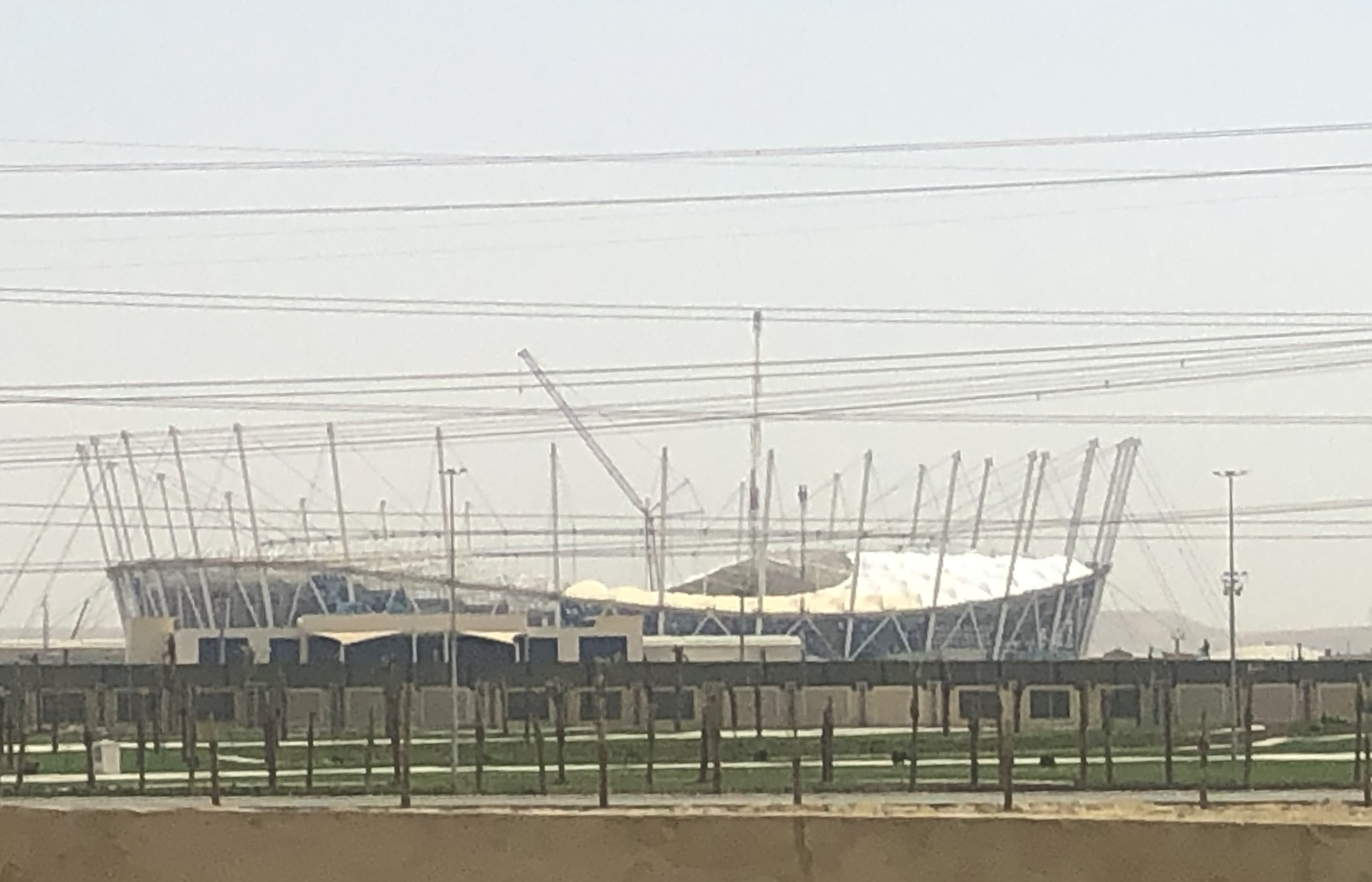
The 94,000-capacity Misr Stadium.

Egypt has hosted 5 African Cups in 1959, 1974, 1986, 2006 and 2019. The country also hosted the 1997 U-17 World Cup and the 2009 U-20 World Cup.

#	Stadium	Capacity	Location	Home team	Opened
1	Misr Stadium	93,940	New Administrative Capital	Egypt football team	2024
2	Borg El Arab Stadium	86,000	Borg El Arab	Egypt football team & Al-Masry SC	2007
3	Cairo International Stadium	75,000	Cairo	Egypt football team & Al Ahly SC & Zamalek SC	23 July 1960
4	Egyptian Army Stadium	45,000	Suez	Petrojet FC	2009
5	Arab Contractors Stadium	35,000	Cairo	Al Mokawloon & FC Masr	1979
6	30 June Stadium	30,000	Cairo	Wadi Degla SC	2009
7	Al-Salam Stadium	30,000	Cairo	El-Entag El-Harby SC	2009
8	Beni Ebeid Stadium	30,000	Beni Ebeid	Beni Ebeid SC	

== Attendances ==
The average attendance per top-flight football league season and the club with the highest average attendance:

Season	League average	Best club	Best club average
2010-11	6,561	Al-Ahly	22,370
1996-97	5,997	Al-Ahly	18,333

Source: League page on Wikipedia

== Support ==
Al Ahly and Zamalek leaded the top six most popular football clubs on social media from Africa on 12 October 2022:

#	Football club	Country	Followers
1	Al Ahly	Egypt	33 million
2	Zamalek	Egypt	22 million
3	Raja CA	Morocco	7 million
4	Kaizer Chiefs	South Africa	6 million
5	Orlando Pirates	South Africa	4 million
6	Simba SC	Tanzania	4 million

=== English Premier League ===
Currently, the most popular English Premier League club in Egypt is Liverpool, largely thanks to Egyptian player Mohamed Salah, who captains the Egypt national team. Previously, Salah's old club Chelsea was more popular.

Twitter research from 2015 found that the most popular Premier League club in Egypt was Chelsea, with 26% of Egyptian Premier League fans following the club, followed by Manchester United (18%) and Arsenal (17%).

== See also ==
- Cairo League
- King's Cup
- Sultan Hussein Cup
- List of football clubs in Egypt
- Women's football in Egypt
