= Elsaid Maher =

Egyptian footballer (born 1991)

Personal information
- Full name: Elsaid Maher Taher Mohamed
- Date of birth: 4 March 1991 (age 35)
- Positions: Midfielder; forward

Team information
- Current team: Al Qazzazin

Youth career
- Dyarb Negm Youth Center
- Al Masry
- Al Ittihad
- El Dakhleya
- Telecom Egypt

Senior career*
Years	Team	Apps	(Gls)
2015–2017	Dar Al Dawa		
2017–2019	Kahraba Talkha		
2019	HIFK	3	(0)
2020–2021	Beni Ebeid		
2021–2022	Gomhoriat Shebin		
2022–	Al Qazzazin		
- * Club domestic league appearances and goals as of 15 December 2022

Elsaid Maher Taher Mohamed (Arabic: السعيد ماهر; born 4 March 1991), is an Egyptian footballer who currently plays as a forward for Al Qazzazin.

== Club career ==
Having played for Al Masry, Al Ittihad, El Dakhleya and Telecom Egypt, all in his native Egypt, Maher moved to Jordan in 2015 to sign for Dar Al Dawa. On his return to Egypt, he spent two seasons with Egyptian Second Division side Kahraba Talkha, before a shock move to Finland with Veikkausliiga club HIFK in 2019.

After three appearances with HIFK, Maher again returned to Egypt, signing with Beni Ebeid in November 2020. He would spend two seasons in the Egyptian Second Division, the second with Gomhoriat Shebin, before a move to Egyptian Third Division side Al Qazzazin in September 2022.

== International career ==
Maher represented Egypt at the 2019 Socca World Cup.

== Career statistics ==
=== Club ===
Club	Season	League			Cup		Continental		Other		Total	
Club	Season	Division	Apps	Goals	Apps	Goals	Apps	Goals	Apps	Goals	Apps	Goals
HIFK	2019	Veikkausliiga	3	0	0	0	0	0	0	0	3	0
Career total			3	0	0	0	0	0	0	0	3	0
