= Hockey Africa Cup for Club Champions =

Africa Cup for Club Champions
- Most recent season or competition: 2024
- Sport: Field hockey
- Founded: 1988
- First season: 1988
- No. of teams: 6
- Confederation: AfHF (Africa)
- Most titles: (Egypt) El Sharkia (28th titles)

The Africa Cup for Club Champions (ACCC) is a men's field hockey competition for clubs in Africa. It was first played for in 1988.

== Summaries ==
Year	Host	Final			Third place match			Number of teams
Year	Host	Winner	Score	Runner-up	Third place	Score	Fourth place	Number of teams
1988	Cairo, Egypt	(Egypt); El Sharkia	0–0 (4–3 p)	(Nigeria); Bendel Flickers Club	(Egypt); Police Union Club	–		
1989	Blantyre, Malawi	(Egypt); El Sharkia	–	(Egypt); Zamalek SC	(Nigeria); Union Bank Club	–		
1990	Casablanca, Morocco	(Egypt); El Sharkia		(Kenya); Simba Union Club	(Ghana); Golden Sticks			
1991		(Egypt); El Sharkia		(Ghana); Exchequers Club	(Zimbabwe); Queens Club			
1992		(Egypt); El Sharkia		(Kenya); Simba Union Club	(Ghana); Trustee Club	–		
1993		(Egypt); El Sharkia		(South Africa); Jeppe Quondam	(Egypt); Police Union	–		
1994		(Egypt); El Sharkia		(South Africa); Technikon Natal	(Egypt); Steel & Iron Club	–		
1995		(Egypt); El Sharkia		(Nigeria); Yobe Desert Rollers	(Egypt); Police Union			
1996		(Egypt); El Sharkia		(Egypt); Steel & Iron Club	(Egypt); Supa Sweet Wits			
1997		(Egypt); El Sharkia		(South Africa); Berea Rovers	Kenya Armed Forces			
1998		Kenya Armed Forces		(Egypt); El Sharkia	(Ghana); Exchequers Club			
1999		(Egypt); El Sharkia		(Zimbabwe); Bulawayo Athletic Club	Kenya Armed Forces			
2000		(Egypt); El Sharkia		(Egypt); Siadine	Kenya Armed Forces			
2002		(Egypt); Ittihad El Shorta SC			–			
2003		(Egypt); Ittihad El Shorta SC			–			
2004		(Egypt); El Sharkia		–				
2005		(Egypt); El Sharkia				–		
2006		(Egypt); El Sharkia			–			
2007		(Egypt); El Sharkia			–			
2008		(Egypt); El Sharkia			–			
2009	Nairobi, Kenya	(Egypt); El Sharkia			–			
2010		(Egypt); El Sharkia				–		
2011		(Egypt); El Sharkia				–		
2012		(Egypt); El Sharkia				–		
2013		(Egypt); El Sharkia				–		
2014	Kampala, Uganda	(Egypt); Ittihad El Shorta SC		(Egypt); El Sharkia				
2015	Lusaka, Zambia	(Egypt); Eastern Company SC	2–1	(Egypt); El Sharkia	(Nigeria); Niger Flickers	3–2	(Ghana); Trustees	12
2016	Nairobi, Kenya	(Egypt); Eastern Company SC	3–2	Kenya Police HC	(Kenya); Butali Warriors	3–0	Ghana Police HC	
2017	Accra, Ghana	(Egypt); El Sharkia	^{n/a}	(Egypt); Eastern Company SC	(Nigeria); Niger Flickers	^{n/a}	(Ghana); Trustees HC	
2018	Abuja, Nigeria	(Egypt); El Sharkia	^{n/a}	(Ghana); GRA HC	(Egypt); Eastern Company	^{n/a}	(Ghana); Exchequers HC	
2019	Ismailia, Egypt	(Egypt); El Sharkia	1–0	(Egypt); Smouha	(Nigeria); Kada Stars	^{n/a}	(Nigeria); Niger Flickers	8
2021	Accra, Ghana	(Egypt); Tairat SC	7–2	(Egypt); Zamalek	(Nigeria); Kada Stars	2–1	(Egypt); Eastern Company	9
2022	Nairobi, Kenya	(Egypt); El Sharkia	4–2	(Ghana); Excheckers	(Kenya); Butali Sugar	3–2	(Nigeria); Police Machine	12
2023	Blantyre, Malawi	(Egypt); El Sharkia	4–2	(Kenya); Western Jaguars	(Uganda); Kampala	3–1	(Malawi); Genetrix	6
2024	Ismailia, Egypt	(Egypt); El Sharkia	4–4 (5–3 p.s.o.)	(Egypt); Tairat SC	(Egypt); Port Fouad	4–3	(Kenya); Sikh Union	10
2026	Harare, Zimbabwe	(Egypt); Portfouad	2–2 (8–7 p.s.o.)	(Egypt); El Sharkia	Ghana Revenue Authority	2–2 (2–1 p.s.o.)	(Zimbabwe); Hippo	9

^n/a A round-robin tournament determined the final standings.

== See also ==
- Hockey Africa Cup for Club Champions (women)
