= AC3 =

AC3 or AC-3 may refer to:

== Science and technology ==
- Dolby AC-3, Dolby Digital audio codec
- AC-3 algorithm (Arc Consistency Algorithm 3), one of a series of algorithms used for the solution of constraint satisfaction problems
- (35414) 1998 AC3, a minor planet
- AC-3, an IEC utilization category

== Transportation ==
- Comte AC-3, a 1920s Swiss bomber/transport aircraft
- Southern Pacific class AC-3, a class of steam locomotive

== Video games ==
- Ace Combat 3, part of the Ace Combat series of video games
- Armored Core 3, part of the Armored Core series of video games
- Assassin's Creed III, part of the Assassin's Creed series of video games

== Other ==
- Apple Campus 3, Apple's third large Silicon Valley campus
