= Southern Pacific class MC-6 =

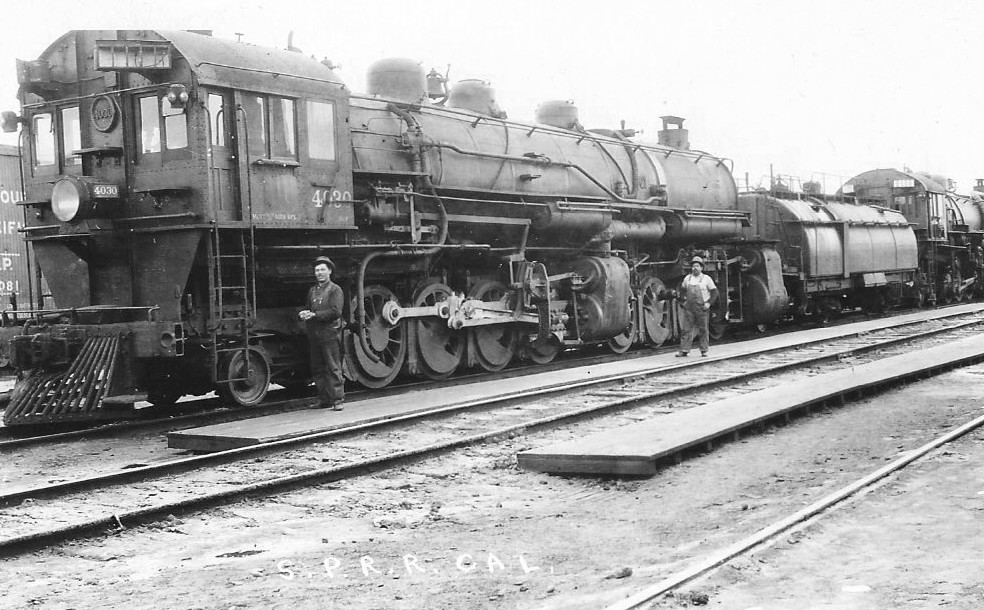
- Southern Pacific cab forward mallet locomotive 4030
Type and origin
- Power type: Steam
- Builder: Baldwin Locomotive Works
- Serial number: 38523–38534, 38711–38713, 39673, 39731, 39857, 39858, 39874
- Build date: October–December 1912 and April–May 1913
- Total produced: 20
Specifications
- Configuration
  - Whyte: 2-8-8-2
  - UIC: (1′D)D1′ h4v
- Gauge: 4 ft 8 1/2 in (1,435 mm) standard gauge
- Driver dia.: 57 in (1,448 mm)
- Axle load: 51,200 lb (23,223.9 kg; 23.2 t)
- Adhesive weight: 400,700 lb (181,800 kg; 181.8 t)
- Loco weight: 435,800 lb (197,700 kg; 197.7 t)
- Total weight: 615,200 lb (279,100 kg; 279.1 t)
- Fuel type: Fuel oil
- Fuel capacity: 3,200 US gal (12,000 L; 2,700 imp gal)
- Water cap.: 10,000 US gal (38,000 L; 8,300 imp gal)
- Firebox
  - Grate area: 60.4 sq ft (5.61 m^{2})
- Boiler pressure: 200 psi (1.38 MPa)
- Heating surface: 4,177 sq ft (388.1 m^{2})
- Superheater
  - Heating area: 5,016 sq ft (466.0 m^{2})
- Cylinders: Four
- High-pressure cylinder: 26 in × 30 in (660 mm × 762 mm)
- Low-pressure cylinder: 40 in × 30 in (1,016 mm × 762 mm)
- Valve gear: Walschaerts
Performance figures
- Tractive effort: 94,880 lbf (422.05 kN)
Career
- Operators: Southern Pacific Company
- Class: MC-6
- Numbers: 4029 – 4048
- First run: December 17, 1912
- Retired: 1946 – 1949
- Disposition: All rebuilt as AC-3 class; all of which were scrapped

Southern Pacific Company's MC-6 class of steam locomotives is made up of two batches: the first consisting of 15 locomotives weighing 435,800 pounds (197.7 tonnes) built in 1912, the second consisting of 5 locomotives weighing 437,100 lb (198.3 tonnes) built in 1913. All of the locomotives were built by Baldwin Locomotive Works. This was the last class of 2-8-8-2 "Mallet" type steam locomotives that Southern Pacific (SP) ordered as cab forward locomotives.

Locomotive number 4043, the newest of the early class of MC-6 locomotives, was displayed at the Panama–Pacific International Exposition along with SP's first locomotive, C. P. Huntington.

All but three of the locomotives in this class were rebuilt as the AC-3 class with "simpled" uniform cylinders of 22 in × 30 in (559 mm × 762 mm) by 1930. The last three were thus rebuilt in 1937. During the rebuild, 4¼-BL Worthington feedwater heaters were also installed on the fireman's side of the locomotives.

After their rebuilds, the locomotives were used through the end of World War II with the last one scrapped on August 20, 1949.
