= Hassan Mostafa =

Egyptian footballer (born 1979)

Personal information
- Full name: Hassan Mostafa Hassan Abdel Rahman
- Date of birth: 20 November 1979 (age 46)
- Place of birth: Giza, Egypt
- Height: 1.72 m (5 ft 8 in)
- Position: Defensive midfielder

Team information
- Current team: Smouha (assistant)

Youth career
- Al Ahly

Senior career*
Years	Team	Apps	(Gls)
2000–2003	Al-Ittihad	30	(0)
2003–2009	Al Ahly	80	(0)
2007–2008	→ Al-Wahda (loan)	23	(0)
2009–2009	→ El Shorta (loan)	14	(0)
2009–2011	Zamalek	42	(3)
2011–2012	Wadi Degla	8	(0)
2012–2013	El Dakhleya	5	(0)
2013–2014	Ghazl El Mahalla	19	(0)

International career
2003–2009	Egypt	28	(2)

Managerial career
- 2014: Zamalek (assistant)
- 2014–2015: Ittihad Alexandria (assistant)
- 2015–2018: Al Masry (assistant)
- 2018–2020: Smouha (assistant)
- 2018–2019: Pyramids (assistant)
- 2020–2022: Ittihad Alexandria (assistant)
- 2022–2022: Al Masry (assistant)
- 2024–: Sharkia (manager)
- * Club domestic league appearances and goals

Hassan Mostafa Hassan Abdel Rahman (Arabic: حسن مصطفى; born 20 November 1979) is an Egyptian former footballer. He played as a defensive midfielder for Al Ahly and Zamalek and The Egyptian national team. He is currently the manager of Sharkia SC.

== Career ==
=== Ittihad ===
Mostafa began his career with Al Ahly youth team academy, Hassan can't reserve his place at Al Ahly's squad. In 2000 Hassan has joined Alexandria's giant Al-Ittihad, Hassan Spend three seasons in Al Ittihad and has called up for Egyptian national team, after that Hassan return to his home Al Ahly.

=== Al Ahly ===
In 2003, Mostafa returned to Cairo's Al Ahly. He also has many attempts on the goal, and scored 4 goals in the Egyptian League (2005–2006) for Al Ahly. He played a large role in Ahly winning the CAF Champions League 2005 and CAF Champions League 2006. He appeared for Egypt five times during their campaign in the African Cup of Nations Egypt 2006, although all his appearances were as a substitute.

=== Loan to Al-Wahda ===
In 2007, Mostafa signed a one-season loan to Saudi side Al-Wahda. scoring a goal within this season. He returned to Al Ahly and cannot to play in the starting 11 of Al Ahly, and spent all 2008–2009 season on the bench. In 2009, Ahly released him.

=== Zamalek ===
In summer 2009, Hassan joined Al Ahly's rivals Zamalek for free and signed a three-season deal.

== Honours ==
Al Ahly

- Egyptian League: 2004–2005, 2005–2006, 2006–2007, 2007–2008, 2008–2009
- Egyptian Cup: 2006, 2007
- Egyptian Super Cup: 2005, 2006, 2007
- CAF Champions League: 2005, 2006
- African Super Cup: 2006, 2007
- FIFA Club World Cup Bronze Medalist: 2006

Egypt

- African Cup of Nations: 2006, 2008
