= Hockey Africa Cup for Club Champions (women) =

Women's field hockey competition

Africa Cup for Club Champions
- Most recent season or competition: 2021
- Sport: Field hockey
- Founded: 1996
- First season: 1996
- No. of teams: 6
- Confederation: AfHF (Africa)

The Africa Cup for Club Champions (ACCC) is a women's field hockey competition for clubs in Africa. It was first played for in 1996.

== Summaries ==
Year	Host	Final			Third place match			Number of teams
Year	Host	Winner	Score	Runner-up	Third place	Score	Fourth place	Number of teams
1996		(Zimbabwe); Old Hararians		(Namibia); Ramblers Club	(Zimbabwe); Bulawayo Athletic Club			
1997		(South Africa); Technikon Natal		(Namibia); Ramblers Club	(Kenya); Post & Telecomm			
1998		(Kenya); Post & Telecomm		(Namibia); Ramblers Club	(Namibia); D.T.S			
1999		(Kenya); Sliders Club		(Zimbabwe); Old Hararians	(Namibia); Ramblers Club			
2000		(Kenya); Post & Telecomm		(Egypt); Sharkia Club	(Kenya); Sliders Club			
2015	Lusaka, Zambia	Orange Club of Kenya	4–2	Ghana Police	Ghana Revenue Authority	7–0	(Egypt); El Sharkia	8
2016	Nairobi, Kenya	Orange Club of Kenya	^{n/a}	Ghana Revenue Authority	(Nigeria); Kada Queens	^{n/a}	(Nigeria); Heartland	4
2017	Accra, Ghana	Ghana Revenue Authority	^{n/a}	Telkom of Kenya	Ghana Police	^{n/a}	(Nigeria); Kada Queens	6
2018	Abuja, Nigeria	Telkom of Kenya	^{n/a}	Ghana Revenue Authority	Ghana Police	^{n/a}	(Kenya); USIU	6
2019	Ismailia, Egypt	(Egypt); El Sharkia	1–0	Ghana Revenue Authority	Ghana Police	1(2)–1(3)	(Nigeria); Kada Queens	8
2020	Blantyre, Malawi	Cancelled due to the COVID-19 pandemic.			Cancelled.			
2021	Accra, Ghana	Ghana Revenue Authority	3–0	(Nigeria); Delta Queens	Ghana Prisons	4–3	(Nigeria); Plateau Queens	5
2022	Nairobi, Kenya	Ghana Revenue Authority	^{n/a}	(Ghana); Army Ladies	(Nigeria); Delta Queens			7
2023	Blantyre, Malawi	Ghana Revenue Authority						7
2024	Ismailia, Egypt	Ghana Revenue Authority	3–0	(Egypt); Smouha	(Nigeria); Kada Queens	1–0	(Kenya); Mombasa	10
2026	Harare, Zimbabwe	(Kenya); Lakers	1–1 (2-0 p.s.o.)	Ghana Revenue Authority	(Zimbabwe); Hippo	1–0	(Zimbabwe); BHC	

^n/a A round-robin tournament determined the final standings.

== Records and statistics ==
=== Performances by club ===
Team	Titles	Runners-up	Third-place	Fourth-place
Ghana Revenue Authority	5 (2017, 2021, 2022, 2023, 2024)	3 (2016, 2018, 2019)	1 (2015)	
Orange Club of Kenya	2 (2015, 2016)			
Telkom of Kenya	1 (2018)	1 (2017)		
(Egypt) El Sharkia	1 (2019)	1 (2000)	1 (2007)	1 (2015)
Ghana Police		1 (2015)	4 (2017, 2018, 2019, 2021)	
(Nigeria) Delta Queens		1 (2021)	1 (2022)	
(Egypt) Smouha		1 (2024)		
(Ghana) Army Ladies		1 (2022)		
(Nigeria) Kada Queens			1 (2016)	2 (2017, 2019)
(Nigeria) Heartland				1 (2016)
(Kenya) USIU				1 (2017)
(Nigeria) Plateau Queens				1 (2021)

=== Performances by nation ===
Rank	Nation	Gold	Silver	Bronze	Total
1	Ghana (GHA)	3	5	5	13
2	Kenya (KEN)	3	1	0	4
3	Egypt (EGY)	1	2	1	4
4	Nigeria (NGR)	0	1	2	3
Totals (4 entries)		7	9	8	24

== See also ==
- Hockey Africa Cup for Club Champions - Men's
