= Al Fanar SC =

Egyptian football club

Al Fanar
- Full name: Al Fanar Sporting Club
- Short name: FAN
- League: Egyptian Second Division
- Website: https://al-fanarclub.blogspot.com/

Al Fanar Sporting Club (Arabic: نادي الفنار الرياضي, is an Egyptian football club based in Port Said, Egypt. The club currently plays in the Egyptian Second Division, the second-highest league in the Egyptian football league system.
