= New Administrative Capital Stadium =

Stadium in New Administrative Capital, Egypt

Misr Stadium
- ستاد مصر
- Egypt Stadium
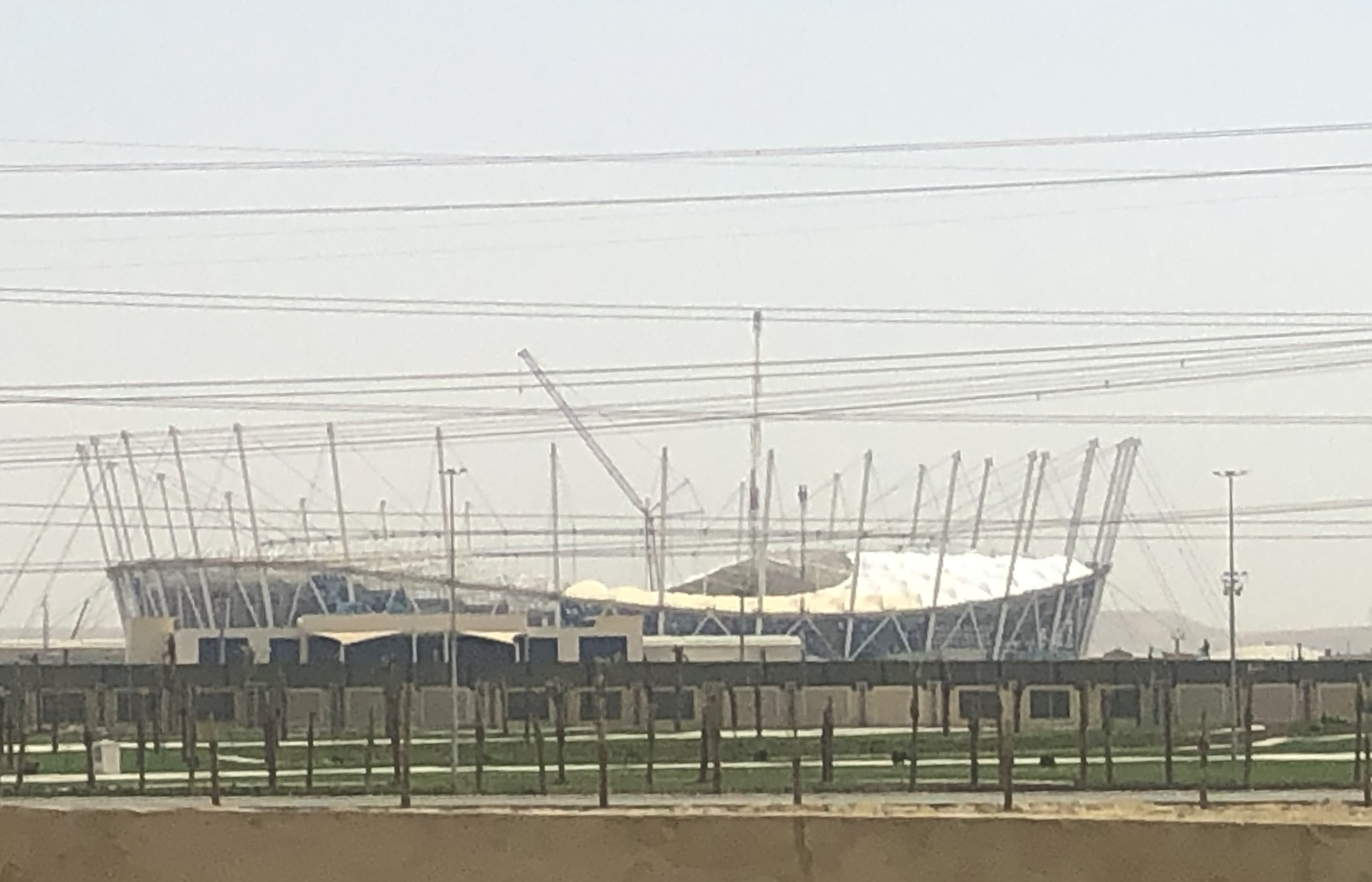
- Misr Stadium under construction in April 2022
- Interactive map of Misr Stadium
- Location: The New Capital, Egypt
- Coordinates: 29°53′32″N 31°40′23″E
- Owner: Government of Egypt
- Capacity: 93,940
- Surface: GrassMaster
- Record attendance: 85,350

Construction
- Built: 2019–2023
- Opened: 22 March 2024; 2 years ago
- Cost: E£900 million
- Architect: SHESA Architects
- Main contractor: Orascom Construction

Tenant
- Egypt national football team (2024–present)

Misr Stadium (Egyptian Arabic: ستاد مصر, translit: Egypt Stadium), also known as the New Capital Stadium, is a stadium in Egypt's Olympic Sports City in the New Capital. It has a capacity of over 93,940 people, making it the largest stadium in the country and the second largest in Africa.

It is part of the Egypt International Olympic City, a large sports complex that has been under construction since 2015. It will have a training ground, two indoor halls (one of them a 15,000-capacity arena), an Olympic-size swimming pool, and other buildings, and is being built with an eye toward the country's possible bids for the Olympic Games or the FIFA World Cup.

== History ==
Construction of the stadium began in 2019 as part of a large Olympic sports complex. It was designed by Italian firms SHESA Architects and MJW Structures with partnership with Cosmos-E engineers and consultants, who had also worked on Juventus Stadium in Turin and the Paul Biya stadium in Yaoundè, Cameroon. Orascom Construction were the main contractor, Design Review and Construction Supervision by ACE Consulting Engineers (Moharram and Bakhoum), Owner and Project Management EAAF.

The stadium was completed in late 2023, and hosted the Egypt national football team training camp before the 2023 Africa Cup of Nations. It was inaugurated on 22 March 2024, when Egypt hosted New Zealand in a friendly match, beating them 1–0.

== Design ==
The Misr Stadium is built on an elliptical ground plan. The roof is stylistically based on the headdress and the royal necklace of Nefertiti, the ancient Egyptian queen. The Stadium has a running track.

== Matches ==
The stadium hosted its first match on 22 March 2024, between Egypt and New Zealand, as the opener of 2024 ACUD Cup, which was part of the first 2024 FIFA Series.

2024 ACUD Cup semi-final
22 March 2024
22:00 UTC+2

Egypt	1–0	New Zealand
Mohamed 29' (pen.)	Report

Misr Stadium, New Administrative Capital
Attendance: 30,200
Referee: Clement Franklin Kpan (Ivory Coast)
2024 ACUD Cup final
26 March 2024
22:00 UTC+2

Egypt	2–4	Croatia
Rabia 6' Abdelmonem 90+4'	Report	Vlašić 21' Petković 57' Kramarić 77' Majer 86'

Misr Stadium, New Administrative Capital
Attendance: 85,350
Referee: Adalbert Diouf (Senegal)

== See also ==
- List of football stadiums in Egypt
- Lists of stadiums
