= Al Salam SC (Esna) =

Egyptian football club

Al Salam
- Full name: Al Salam Sporting Club
- Short name: SAL
- Founded: 1979; 47 years ago
- Ground: Al Salam Stadium
- League: Egyptian Second Division

Al Salam Sporting Club (Arabic: نادي السلام الرياضي بإسنا), is an Egyptian football club based in Esna. The club currently plays in the Egyptian Second Division.
