= El Sharkia (field hockey) =

El Sharkia hockey team
- Full name: El Sharkia hockey team
- Nicknames: Sons of Oraby; Green Boys (supporters)
- Founded: 12 January 1961; 65 years ago
- Ground: Zagazig Stadium
- Capacity: 20,000

El Sharkia Hockey Team is the field hockey team of the El Sharkia Sporting Club, an Egyptian sports club. The team is notable for entering the Guinness Book of Records as Winner of the African Hockey Championship 27 times

Sharkia Club won the title following a win against the Egyptian Police Club (former winner of the title), with 1 goal to 0 in Bulawayo, Zimbabwe, in the presence of between 5,000 and 20,000 fans.

Four Egyptian teams took part in the 26th edition of the African Cup of Club Champions hockey (men and women) in Zimbabwe: Sharkia team (men and women), Police Sports Association team (men), and Shams team (women).

Sharkia team played six games before the final round, in which the team won five, and tied in one. In the first game, the team won against Hamilton, Zimbabwe's champion, in the second against Malawi's champion, Genetrix, in the third against Hypo, Zimbabwe's champion, in the fourth the team had a tie with the Police team, in the fifth the team won against Police Machines, champion of Nigeria, and in the sixth against Trastis, Ghana's team.

Sharkia team followed its African dream in 1988 by winning the first African Clubs Championship which was hosted in Egypt in Police Sports Association Club. The team carried on with the African winnings in consecutive championships, year after year, with a total of 27 African championships. The team made it to the Guinness Book of Records and became the first Arab team to be in the records and have a distinct place globally.

== Honours men's team ==
=== Egyptian Hockey League ===
- (gold) WINNER (33) Record

=== Egypt Hockey Cup ===
- (gold) WINNER (10) Record

=== Egyptian Hockey Super Cup ===
- (gold) WINNER (5) Record

=== Arab Hockey Club Championship ===
- 2013 (silver)

=== Hockey Africa Cup for Club Champions ===
- WINNER (28) Record
- (gold) 1988,1989,1990,1991,1992, 1993,1994,1995,1996,1997,1999,2000,

2004,2005,2006,2007,2008,2009,2010, 2011,2012,2013,2017,2018,2019,2022,2023,2024

- RUNNERS-UP (3)
- (silver) 1998,2014,2015
- Group stage (1)
- 2016

== Honours Women's team ==
=== Egyptian Women's Hockey League ===
- (gold) WINNER (26) Record

=== Egypt Women's Hockey Cup ===
- (gold) WINNER (6) Record

=== Egyptian Super Cup Women's Hockey ===
- (gold) WINNER (4) Record

=== Hockey Africa Cup for Club Champions (women) ===
- WINNER (1)
- (gold) 2019
- RUNNERS-UP (1)
- (silver) 2000
- Third Place (1)
- (bronze) 2007
- Fourth Place (1)
- 2015

== See also ==
- El Sharkia SC
