= Southern Pacific class AC-3 =

Type and origin
- Power type: Steam
Specifications
- Configuration
  - Whyte: 2-8-8-2
- Gauge: 4 ft 8 1/2 in (1,435 mm) standard gauge
- Driver dia.: 57 in (1,448 mm)
- Adhesive weight: 440,800 lb (199,900 kg)
- Loco weight: 481,200 lb (218,300 kg)
- Boiler pressure: 210 psi (1,400 kPa)
- Feedwater heater: 4 1/4-BL Worthington
- Cylinder size: 22 in × 30 in (559 mm × 762 mm) in dia × stroke
Performance figures
- Tractive effort: 90,940 lbf (404,500 N)
Career
- Operators: Southern Pacific Railroad
- Class: AC-3
- Number in class: 20
- Numbers: 4029 – 4048
- Retired: 1946 – 1949
- Disposition: scrapped

Southern Pacific Railroad's AC-3 class of steam locomotive was the 3rd and last cab forward design based on the 2-8-8-2 wheel arrangement. All 20 locomotives in this class were rebuilds from MC-6 class locomotives originally built by Baldwin Locomotive Works in 1912 and 1913. The rebuilds all took place in the late 1920s at Southern Pacific's Sacramento shops.

After the rebuilds, these locomotives were used through World War II. The AC-3ś were used for long freight runs, and during World War II sometimes for passenger/troop cars. All of this class were scrapped soon after retirement.

The first to be retired from active service were numbers 4040 and 4045, both on October 21, 1946; the last was number 4032 on August 8, 1949.
