= A3C =

A3C may refer to:

- Air Copter A3C, a French autogyro
- Airman Third Class, a defunct rank in the US Air Force
- Australian Cyber Collaboration Centre, a government-funded organisation in Adelaide, South Australia
- Shield of the Americas, also known as Americas Counter Cartel Coalition
