= Beni Ebeid SC =

Egyptian football club

- Full name: Beni Ebeid Sporting Club نادي بني عبيد الرياضي
- Short name: BEB
- Founded: 1990; 35 years ago
- Ground: Beni Ebeid Stadium
- Chairman: Makram Radwan
- Manager: Baligh Hamdy
- League: Egyptian Second Division B
- 2022–23: Third Division Group I, 2nd (promoted)

Beni Ebeid Sporting Club (Arabic: نادي بني عبيد الرياضي), also spelt Bani Ebaid, is an Egyptian sports club based in Beni Ebeid, Dakahlia, Egypt. The club is mainly known for its football team, which plays in the Egyptian Second Division B, the third-highest league in the Egyptian football league system.

In 2008, the club gained widespread fame for eliminating Cairo giants and defending champions Zamalek from the 2008–09 Egypt Cup round of 32, whilst being a member of the Egyptian Third Division at that time; causing one of the biggest upsets in Egyptian football history.

== History ==
The club was founded in 1990 by Hermas Radwan, a businessman from Beni Ebeid, who helped to establish the club and funded the building process of the club's new stadium Beni Ebeid Stadium. Beni Ebeid spent most of their history playing in the Egyptian Third Division, and made only six appearances in the second tier of Egyptian football, most recently during the 2020–21 season, where they suffered an immediate return to the Third Division after finishing second from bottom in their group.

In the 2008–09 edition Egypt Cup, the club reached the round of 32 for the first time in their history, after beating Kahraba Talkha on penalties in the third preliminary round. They were drawn at home against defending champions Zamalek, and managed to produce one of the biggest upsets in Egyptian football history as they won the match by a single goal scored by El Sayed El Mandouh in the 80th minute. However, the club's journey in the competition came to an end in the next round, as they lost to local rivals El Mansoura on penalties. Two seasons later, the club reached the Egypt Cup round of 32 again, and for the second time were drawn against Zamalek, but failed to recreate the upset as Zamalek comfortably won the tie 6–0.

Beni Ebeid were one of the founding members of the newly created Egyptian Second Division B in 2023, the new third-tier league in Egyptian football; having secured their place in the inaugural season of the competition after finishing second in Group I of the 2022–23 Egyptian Third Division season.

The club's victory against Zamalek is considered as their biggest achievement. In December 2018, the club celebrated the 10th anniversary of the match.

== Notable players ==
- Nabil Emad
- Khaled El Ghandour
- El Said Maher
