= Al Nasr Lel Taa'den SC =

Egyptian sports club

Al Nasr Lel Taa'den
- Full name: Al Nasr Lel Taa'den Sporting Club
- League: Egyptian Third Division
Home colours	Away colours

Al Nasr Lel Taa'den Sporting Club (Arabic: نادي النصر للتعدين للألعاب الرياضية), is an Egyptian sports club based in Edfu, Aswan, Egypt. It is best known for its football team.

The club promoted for the first time in its history to the Egyptian Premier League during the 2015–16 season of the Egyptian Second Division, after winning the promotion play-off match against Al Assiouty Sport.

== Current squad ==
As of 1 February 2016

Note: Flags indicate national team as defined under FIFA eligibility rules; some limited exceptions apply. Players may hold more than one non-FIFA nationality.

No.	Pos.	Nation	Player
1	GK	EGY	Mostafa Ahmed
2	DF	EGY	Hassan Gaber
3	DF	EGY	Hamad Mohamed
5	MF	EGY	Ramadan Rabie
6	MF	EGY	Hussein Mohamed
9	FW	EGY	Hafez Yehia
10	MF	EGY	Abd El-Aziz Emam
14	DF	EGY	Hossam Abdel Sabor
15	FW	EGY	Mostafa Gomaa

No.	Pos.	Nation	Player
16	GK	EGY	Mahmoud Talaat
17	FW	EGY	Mohamed Abdel Gawad
18	DF	EGY	Mohamed Abdoh
20	DF	EGY	Haitham Mostafa
22	MF	EGY	Mohamed Abdel Fattah
24	MF	EGY	Ahmed Abdel Mawgoud
29	FW	EGY	El Sayed Shaaban
30	MF	EGY	Abdel Ghany Taha
31	FW	GHA	Patrick Ado
