= Suez Canal Stadium =

Sports venue in Ismailia, Egypt

Coordinates: 30.592667°N 32.292528°E

Suez Canal Stadium ملعب قناة السويس
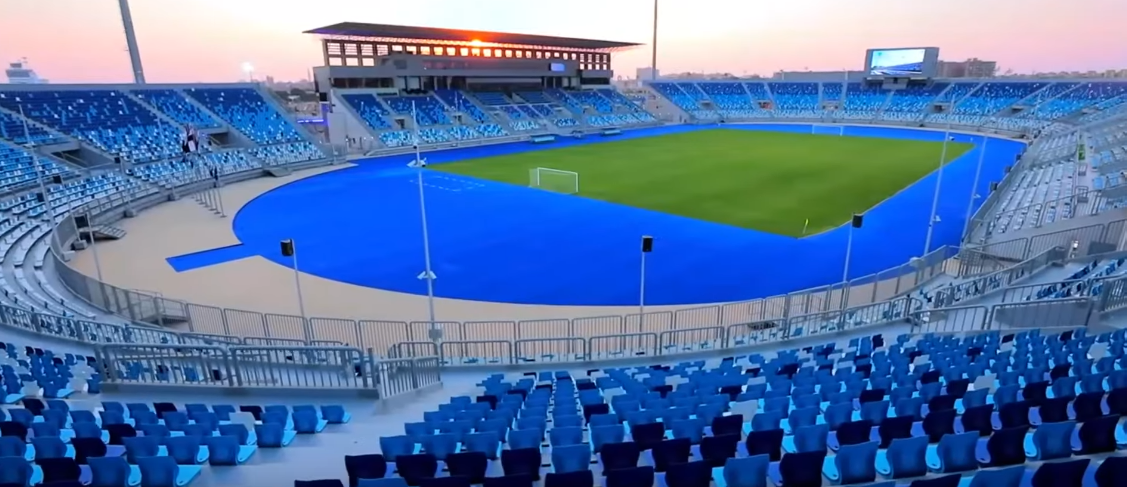
- Interactive map of Suez Canal Stadium ملعب قناة السويس
- Full name: Suez Canal Authority Stadium
- Location: Ismailia, Egypt
- Capacity: 22,000
- Surface: Hybrid grass

Construction
- Renovated: 2019-2022

Tenants
- Ceramica Cleopatra FC, Olympic El-Qanah

The Suez Canal Authority Stadium is located in Ismailia, Egypt. It is used by Olympic El Qanah. The stadium was demolished and was completely reconstructed between 2019 and 2022. Before the reconstruction, it had a capacity of 10,000. The stadium currently has a capacity of 22,000.The stadium was designed by Head Engineer of SC Authority Ahmed Ragab. It is an all-seater.

== See also ==
- List of football stadiums in Egypt
- Lists of stadiums
