= Sharkia SC =

Association football club in Zagazig, Egypt

- Full name: Sharkia Sporting Club
- Nicknames: Sons of Oraby; White Horses; Green Pirates (supporters)
- Founded: 12 January 1961; 65 years ago
- Ground: Zagazig University Stadium
- Capacity: 30,000
- Chairman: Hamdy Marzouk
- Manager: Hassan Mostafa
- League: Egyptian Second Division
- 2023–24: Third Division, 1st (Group H); 3rd (Promotion Group C)
- Website: www.elsharkiaclub.com
| Home colours | Away colours |

Sharkia Sporting Club, (Arabic: نادي الشرقية الرياضي, romanized: Nādī sh-Sharqiyya r-Riyāḍī, Egyptian Arabic pronunciation: [eʃ.ʃæɾˈʔejjæ], locally [eʃ.ʃæɾˈɡejjæ]) is an Egyptian sports club based in Zagazig, El Sharkia, Egypt. The club was founded on 12 January 1961, and is best known for its hockey and football departments.

== Football club ==
El Sharkia participated in the Egyptian Premier League for six times in its history, the first time was in 1973 win they won the 1972–73 Egyptian Second Division title, but the season has canceled after Tersana match, because of Yom Kippur War, the next season 74, the club was able to avoid relegation in its first season in the top flight but failed to stay in the league for more than two consecutive seasons and was relegated 1976.

In 1998, the club won the 1997–98 Egyptian Second Division title and promoted to the Premier League again, like in 1974 they avoided relegation in their first season, and relegated again in 2000.

In 2016, the club won the Egyptian Second Division Promotion play-off match against Tersana on penalties to win their third Egyptian Second Division title and to promote to the Premier League for six time.

In 2026, Sharkia SC merged its football operations with those of Enppi SC to establish a new football club, El Sharkia Enppi SC. The merger followed the establishment of El Sharkia Enppi Football Company, in which Enppi SC holds a 51% stake and Sharkia SC holds the remaining 49%. The merger is limited exclusively to football operations, with both clubs retaining their independence in all other sporting activities.

== Kits and crest ==
The Evolution of the Crest of Sharkia SC
| 1961–1974 | 1974– |

| Classic | 2nd Classic | 1998–2001 Away | 1998–2001 Home | 2010–14 Away | 2010–14 Home | 2016–17 Away | 2016–17 Home | 2018–19 Away | 2018–19 Home |

== Players ==
=== Current squad ===
As of 8 July 2024

Note: Flags indicate national team as defined under FIFA eligibility rules; some limited exceptions apply. Players may hold more than one non-FIFA nationality.

| No. | Pos. | Nation | Player |
|---|---|---|---|
| 16 | GK | EGY | El Shaboury |
| — | GK | EGY | Mohamed El Shenawy |
| — | GK | EGY | Mohamed Talaat |
| 2 | DF | EGY | Bassem Adel |
| — | DF | EGY | Hassan Mario (vice-captain) |
| — | DF | EGY | Mohamed Ismail |
| 7 | DF | EGY | Ahmed Abdelghani (captain) |
| — | DF | EGY | Shkoko |
| — | DF | EGY | Mohamed Khairy |
| — | DF | EGY | Ahmed Sakr |
| — | MF | EGY | Hamed Faisel |
| — | MF | EGY | Omar Fathi |

| No. | Pos. | Nation | Player |
|---|---|---|---|
| — | MF | EGY | Essam Adel |
| — | MF | EGY | Mahmoud Anis |
| — | MF | EGY | Farag Kamal |
| — | FW | EGY | Karim Nasser |
| — | FW | EGY | Mahmoud Rambo |
| — | FW | NGR | Amandeh Manasseh |
| — | FW | EGY | Carlos |
| — | FW | EGY | Mohamed Atef |
| — | FW | EGY | Sherif Wasfy |
| — | FW | EGY | Sayed Mostafa |
| — | FW | EGY | Ahmed Pally |

== Coaching staff ==
Coaching staff
| (Egypt) Hassan Mostafa | Head coach |
| (Egypt) Amr El-Safty | Assistant coach |
| (Egypt) Mohamed Bronto | Assistant coach |
| (Egypt) Hamada Heinedk | Goalkeeping coach |
Medical department
| (Egypt) Alaa Mostafa | Team doctor |
| (Egypt) Reda Helal | Physiotherapist |
Sport management and organisation
| (Egypt) Alaa Mokhtar | Football director |
| (Egypt) Hesham Goda | Head of Youth Football |
| (Egypt) Alaa Masaoud | Youth academy general manager |

== Hockey team ==
El Sharkia Club continues its hockey achievements by entering the Guinness Book of Records as the club won the African Championship Hockey League, its 26th edition, making the 23rd African win in history, 12 consecutive African titles, a sports record in the Encyclopedia of World Sport.

Sharkia Club won the title following a win against the Egyptian Police Club (former winner of the title), with 1 goal to 0 in Bulawayo, Zimbabwe, in the presence of an estimated 5,000 to 20,000 fans who filled the stadium.

Four Egyptian teams took part in the 26th edition of the African Cup of Club Champions hockey (men and women) in Zimbabwe: Sharkia team (men and women), Police Sports Association team (men), and Shams team (women).

Sharkia team played six games before the final round, in which the team won five, and tied in one. In the first game, the team won against Hamilton, Zimbabwe's champion, in the second against Malawi's champion, Genetrix, in the third against Hypo, Zimbabwe's champion, in the fourth the team had a tie with the Police team, in the fifth the team won against Police Machines, champion of Nigeria, and in the sixth against Trastis, Ghana's team.

Meanwhile, the women's team won the Kenya Women hockey title after winning against the host team in Zimbabwe by 7 goals to 0, maintaining the title, which it won last year in Ugandan capital Kampala.

Sharkia team followed its African dream in 1988 by winning the first African Clubs Championship which was hosted in Egypt in Police Sports Association Club. The team carried on with the African winnings in consecutive championships, year after year, with a total of 27 out of 34 African championships, as well as 32 wins in the local league and 10 Egyptian cups. The team made it to the Guinness Book of Records and became the first African team to be in the records and have a distinct place globally.

== Fans and Ultras group ==
Sharkia is considered one of the popular teams in Egypt and the most popular in El Sharkia

An Ultras group was formed on 2012 for Sharkia fans and was called Ultras Green Pirates or simply (UGP).

== Honours ==
- Egyptian Second Division
  - Winners (3): 1972–73, 1997–98, 2015–16

== See also ==
- El Sharkia (field hockey)
