= Beni Ebeid =

Beni Ebeid بني عبيد
- City
- Location in Egypt
- Coordinates: 31.023419°N 31.647876°E
- Country: Egypt
- Governorate: Dakahlia

Area
  - Total: 105.5 km^{2} (40.7 sq mi)

Population (2023)
  - Total: 142,580
  - Density: 1,351/km^{2} (3,500/sq mi)
- Time zone: UTC+2 (EET)
  - Summer (DST): UTC+3 (EEST)

Beni Ebeid (Arabic: بني عبيد) is a city in the Dakahlia Governorate, Egypt. Its population is 45,157 people as of 2020.

The older name of the city is Disa (Arabic: ديسة).

== Sport ==
There is a Beni Ebeid stadium which has a capacity of 30,000 and the local football club Beni Ebeid Sporting Club play there, who are currently playing in the Egyptian Third Division, the third-highest league in the Egyptian football league system.

In the 2008–09 Beni Ebeid SC eliminated Cairo giants Zamalek from the Egypt Cup Round of 32.
