= Faiyum Stadium =

Football stadium in Egypt

Coordinates: 29.3185°N 30.8402°E

Al-Fayoum Stadium
- Interactive map of Al-Fayoum Stadium
- Location: Fayoum, Egypt
- Capacity: 20,000
- Surface: Grass

Tenant
- Misr El Makasa

The Al-Fayoum Stadium was a multi-purpose stadium located in Fayoum, Egypt. It was used mostly for football and serves as the home stadium of Misr El Makasa. The stadium had a capacity of 20,000 people. This stadium is permanently closed.
