= Zagazig Stadium =

Multi-purpose stadium in Zagazig, Egypt

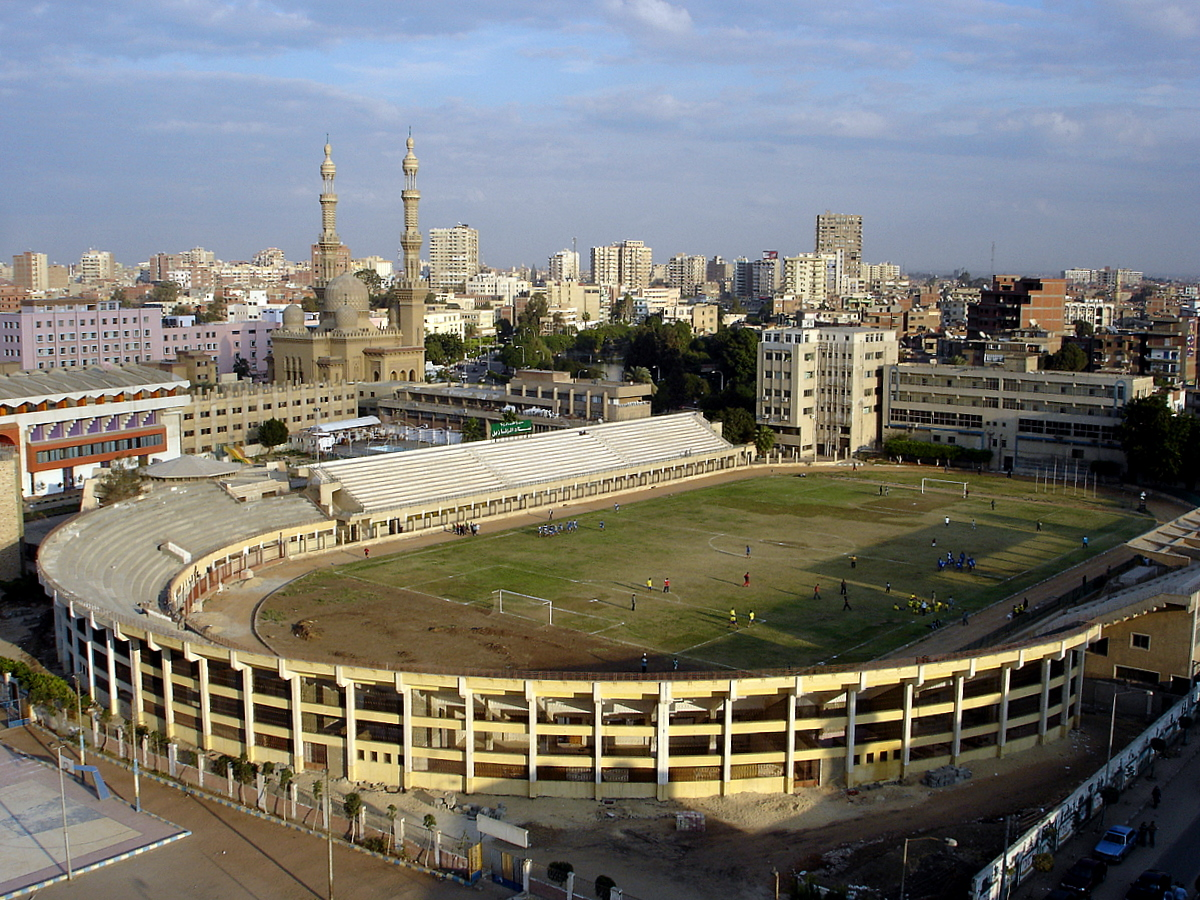
- Interactive map of Zagazig Stadium
- Location: Zagazig, Sharqia Governorate, Egypt
- Coordinates: 30.591667°N 31.476944°E
- Owner: Sharqia Governorate
- Capacity: 20,000
- Surface: Grass

Construction
- Built: 1950

Tenant
- El Sharkia SC

Zagazig Stadium (Arabic: ملعب الزقازيق, romanized: Malʿab az-Zaqāzīq), officially Zagazig University Stadium (ملعب جامعة الزقازيق, Malʿab Jāmiʿat az-Zaqāzīq), is a multi-purpose stadium in Zagazig, Egypt. It is currently used mostly for football matches and hosts the home games of El Sharkia SC. It holds 20,000 people.
