= Fathallah =

- Gender: Male
- Language: Arabic

Origin
- Meaning: Conquest of Allah (by Allah)

Other names
- Variant forms: Fath Allah, Fathalla

Fathallah, Fathalla or the Turkish variant Fethullah is a transliteration of the Arabic given name, فتح الله (Fatḥ Allāh), built from the Arabic words fath and Allah. It is one of many Arabic theophoric names, meaning "Allah's opening (God's opening)" or "God's conquest".

== Given name ==
=== Fathallah ===
- Fathallah Oualalou (born 1942), Moroccan politician
- Fathallah Saqqal (1898–1970), Syrian attorney, writer and government minister
- Fathallah Sijilmassi (born 1966), Moroccan politician and economist
- Fathallah al-Zani, Libyan politician

=== Fethullah ===
- Fethullah Gülen (1941–2024), Turkish preacher, former imam, writer and political figure. Founder of the Gülen movement (also known as Hizmet)

== Surname ==
- Hesham Fathallah (born 1990), Egyptian footballer
- Mahmoud Fathalla (born 1982), Egyptian footballer

== Places ==
- Fathallah barracks, the early headquarters of the Hezbollah organisation
- Kalateh-ye Fathallah, a village in Shirin Su Rural District, Maneh District, Maneh and Samalqan County, North Khorasan Province, Iran

== Other ==
- Fathallah Gomla Market, a supermarket chain in Egypt
