= 2013–14 Egyptian Premier League =

Egyptian Premier League
- Season: 2013–14
- Dates: 26 December 2013 – 7 July 2014
- Champions: Al Ahly; 37th Premier League title
- Relegated: Telephonat Beni Suef; El Qanah; Ghazl El Mahalla; El Entag El Harby; El Minya
- Champions League: Al Ahly; Smouha
- Confederation Cup: Zamalek; Petrojet
- Matches: 227
- Goals: 467 (2.06 per match)
- Top goalscorer: (Ghana) John Antwi (11 Goals)
- Biggest home win: Wadi Degla 6–0 El Minya (29 December 2013)
- Biggest away win: El Qanah 0–4 Zamalek (5 February 2014)
- Highest scoring: El Dakhleya 5–2 El Raja (7 May 2014); Zamalek 4–3 Ittihad El Shorta (14 June 2014)
- Longest winning run: Al Ahly, Smouha (4 Matches)
- Longest unbeaten run: Al Ittihad Al Sakandary (11 Matches)
- Longest winless run: El Gaish (9 Matches)

The 2013–14 Egyptian Premier League was the fifty-seventh season of the Egyptian Premier League since its establishment in 1948. It started on 26 December 2013 and ended on 7 July 2014

== Clubs ==
A total of 65 clubs have played in the Egyptian Premier League from its inception in 1948–49 up to and including the 2013–14 season. But only two clubs have been members of the Egyptian Premier League for every season since its inception. They are Al Ahly and Zamalek.

The league consists of 2 groups each of 11 clubs. Al Ahly tops the first group, and Zamalek tops the second. The first two teams of each group will advance to the competition playoff, while the ninth team of each group will advance to the relegation play-off. The last two teams of each group will be relegated directly to the Egyptian Second Division.

The following 22 clubs are competing in the Egyptian Premier League during the 2013–14 season.

== League table ==
=== Group 1 ===
Pos	Team	Pld	W	D	L	GF	GA	GD	Pts	Qualification or relegation
1	Al Ahly (Q)	20	12	4	4	30	10	+20	40	Qualification to Championship play-off
2	Smouha (Q)	20	10	5	5	24	20	+4	35	Qualification to Championship play-off
3	Al Ittihad	20	7	10	3	20	17	+3	31	
4	Al Mokawloon	20	7	9	4	27	17	+10	30	
5	El Gouna	20	7	5	8	17	16	+1	26	
6	El Dakhleya	20	5	10	5	18	19	−1	25	
7	Misr Lel Makkasa	20	5	9	6	17	22	−5	24	
8	ENPPI	20	4	10	6	19	19	0	22	
9	El Raja (O)	20	5	6	9	23	34	−11	21	Qualification to Relegation play-off
10	Ghazl El Mahalla (R)	20	3	10	7	13	21	−8	19	Relegation to Second Division
11	El Entag El Harby (R)	20	2	8	10	15	28	−13	14	Relegation to Second Division

Source: Soccerway
Rules for classification: 1) Points; 2) Goal difference; 3) Goals scored.
(O) Relegation play-off winner; (Q) Qualified to the phase indicated; (R) Relegated

=== Group 2 ===
Pos	Team	Pld	W	D	L	GF	GA	GD	Pts	Qualification or relegation
1	Zamalek (Q)	20	10	5	5	35	21	+14	35	Qualification to Championship play-off
2	Petrojet (Q)	20	9	8	3	28	17	+11	35	Qualification to Championship play-off
3	Ittihad El Shorta	20	9	8	3	25	16	+9	35	
4	Ismaily	20	8	8	4	24	16	+8	32	
5	Tala'ea El Gaish	20	5	10	5	19	17	+2	25	
6	Wadi Degla	20	6	6	8	26	24	+2	24	
7	Al Masry	20	5	9	6	17	20	−3	24	
8	Haras El Hodoud	20	6	6	8	11	15	−4	24	
9	Telephonat Beni Suef (R)	20	4	10	6	16	22	−6	22	Qualification to Relegation play-off
10	El Qanah (R)	20	5	7	8	14	24	−10	22	Relegation to Second Division
11	El Minya (R)	20	3	3	14	15	38	−23	12	Relegation to Second Division

Source: Soccerway
Rules for classification: 1) Points; 2) Goal difference; 3) Goals scored.
(Q) Qualified to the phase indicated; (R) Relegated

== Final stage ==
=== Championship play-off ===
Pos	Team	Pld	W	D	L	GF	GA	GD	Pts	Qualification or relegation
1	Al Ahly (C)	3	2	1	0	5	0	+5	7	Qualification to Champions League
2	Smouha	3	2	1	0	6	2	+4	7	Qualification to Champions League
3	Zamalek	3	1	0	2	3	3	0	3	Qualification to Confederation Cup (Note: Since the winners of the 2014 Egypt Cup, Zamalek, qualified for African competition based on league position, the spot awarded to the Cup winner (Confederation Cup) was passed to the fourth-placed team which were the next best teams in the table not already qualified for any African competition.)
4	Petrojet	3	0	0	3	1	10	−9	0	Qualification to Confederation Cup

Source: Soccerway
Rules for classification: 1) Points; 2) Goal difference; 3) Goals scored.
(C) Champion

=== Relegation play-off ===
26 June 2014
18:00 UTC+2

El Raja	1–0	Telephonat Beni Suef
Salem 66'

Petro Sport Stadium, Cairo
Referee: Gehad Grisha

Telephonat Beni Suef relegated to the Second Division.
