= Mohamed Mohsen =

Egyptian footballer (born 1990)

Personal information
- Full name: Mohamed Mohsen El Sayed
- Date of birth: October 1, 1990 (age 36)
- Position: Central midfielder

Team information
- Current team: El Qanah

Youth career
- Ismaily

Senior career*
Years	Team	Apps	(Gls)
–2012	Ismaily		
2012–2013	Al Ittihad Alexandria		
2013–2014	El Minya		
2014–2015	El Mokawloon		
2015–2016	Ghazl El Mahalla		
2016–2017	Aswan		
2017	Suez		
2017–2018	El Raja SC		
2018–	El Qanah		
2019	→ Al-Sadd (loan)		
- * Club domestic league appearances and goals as of 28 August 2017

Mohamed Mohsen (Arabic: محمد محسن; born October 1, 1990) is an Egyptian professional footballer who currently plays as a central midfielder for El Qanah.
