= Mohamed Mamdouh =

Mohamed Mamdouh may refer to:

- Mohamed Mamdouh (handballer) (born 1989), Egyptian handball player.
- Mohamed Mamdouh (swimmer) (born 1985), Egyptian swimmer.
- Mohamed Mamdouh (footballer) (born 1993), Egyptian footballer.
