= Islam Abou Ouffa =

Egyptian footballer (born 1990)

Personal information
- Date of birth: April 22, 1990 (age 36)
- Position: Defensive midfielder

Team information
- Current team: Ala'ab Damanhour

Senior career*
| Years | Team | Apps | (Gls) |
| –2015 | Ala'ab Damanhour | | |
| 2015–2016 | Haras El Hodoud | | |
| 2016–2017 | El Raja SC | | |
| 2017– | Ala'ab Damanhour | | |
- * Club domestic league appearances and goals as of 24 August 2017

Islam Abou Ouffa (Arabic: إِسْلَام أَبُو قُفَّة; born April 22, 1990) is an Egyptian professional footballer who currently plays as a defensive midfielder for the Egyptian club Ala'ab Damanhour. Abo-Ouffa succeeded with Ala'ab Damanhour to promote to 2014–15 Egyptian Premier League, and then moved to Haras El Hodoud and played only one season before moving to El Raja SC where they succeeded again to get promoted to 2017–18 Egyptian Premier League, but he then moved back to Ala'ab Damanhour in Egyptian Second Division with a 2-year contract.
