= Ahmed Haggag =

Egyptian footballer (born 1987)

Personal information
- Date of birth: May 1, 1987 (age 39)
- Position: Centre-forward

Team information
- Current team: El Raja SC

Senior career*
Years	Team	Apps	(Gls)
–2009	El Mokawloon		
2009–2010	Ghazl El Mahalla		
2010–2011	Suez Cement		
2011–2013	Olympic Club		
2013–2015	Banha		
2015–2016	Said El Mahalla		
2016–	Tala'ea El-Gaish		
2017	→Haras El Hodoud (loan)		
2017–2018	→El Raja SC (loan)		
- * Club domestic league appearances and goals as of 5 September 2017

Ahmed Haggag (Arabic: أحمد حجاج; born May 1, 1987) is an Egyptian professional footballer who plays as a centre-forward for the Egyptian club El Raja SC.

Haggag had a car accident in July 2017.
