= Nader El Ashry =

Egyptian footballer (born 1985)

Nader El Ashri
Personal information
- Date of birth: January 30, 1985 (age 41)
- Height: 1.79 m (5 ft 10 in)
- Position: Central midfielder

Team information
- Current team: El Raja SC

Senior career*
Years	Team	Apps	(Gls)
–2009	Ghazl El Mahalla		
2009–2014	Enppi	95	(1)
2014–2015	Tala'ea El-Gaish		
2015–2016	Haras El Hodoud	10	(0)
2016–	El Raja SC		
- * Club domestic league appearances and goals as of 27 August 2017

Nader El Ashri (Arabic: نادر العشري; born January 30, 1985) is an Egyptian professional footballer who currently plays as a central midfielder for the Egyptian club El Raja SC. He joined El Raja SC in 2016 in a free transfer and managed to get promoted with the team to 2017–18 Egyptian Premier League.
