= Ahmed Sabry =

Ahmed Sabry may refer to:

- Ahmed Sabry (fencer)
- Ahmed Sabry (footballer)
