= Emad Alaa =

Egyptian professional footballer (born 1990)

Personal information
- Date of birth: June 20, 1990 (age 36)
- Position: Defensive midfielder

Team information
- Current team: El Raja SC

Senior career*
Years	Team	Apps	(Gls)
2012–2013	Al Ittihad Alexandria		
2013–2014	El Qanah		
2014–2015	Tersana		
2015–2017	Ala'ab Damanhour		
2017–	El Raja SC		
- * Club domestic league appearances and goals as of 25 August 2017

Emad Alaa (Arabic: عِمَاد عَلَاء; born June 20, 1990) is an Egyptian professional footballer who currently plays as a defensive midfielder for the Egyptian club El Raja SC. In 2017, Alaa signed a 2-year contract for El Raja SC which was promoted to 2017–18 Egyptian Premier League.
