= Mohamed Ibrahim (footballer, born 1985) =

Egyptian footballer

Personal information
- Date of birth: March 11, 1985 (age 41)
- Height: 1.84 m (6 ft 0 in)
- Position: Left back

Team information
- Current team: El Raja SC

Senior career*
Years	Team	Apps	(Gls)
–2009	Petrojet FC		
2009–2010	Haras El Hodoud SC		
2010–2014	El Mokawloon SC		
2014–	El Raja SC		
- * Club domestic league appearances and goals as of 17 August 2017

Mohamed Ibrahim (Arabic: محمد إبراهيم; born March 11, 1985) is an Egyptian professional footballer who currently plays as a left back for the Egyptian club El Raja SC.
