= Ibrahim Rakha =

Egyptian footballer

Personal information
- Position: Attacking midfielder

Team information
- Current team: El Raja SC

Senior career*
Years	Team	Apps	(Gls)
–2015	Tanta FC		
2015–	El Raja SC		
- * Club domestic league appearances and goals as of 1 September 2017

Ibrahim Rakha (Arabic: إبراهيم رخا) is an Egyptian professional footballer. In 2019, he played as an attacking midfielder for the Egyptian club El Raja SC.
