= Mahmoud Fathi =

Egyptian footballer (born 1988)

Personal information
- Date of birth: May 7, 1988 (age 38)
- Place of birth: Kafr El Sheikh, Egypt
- Position: Defensive midfielder

Team information
- Current team: El Raja SC

Senior career*
Years	Team	Apps	(Gls)
–2014	Al Ittihad Alexandria	74	(4)
2014–2015	Enppi	17	(2)
2015–2017	Smouha SC	14	(0)
2017	→El Dakhleya SC (loan)	8	(0)
2017–	El Raja SC	0	(0)
- * Club domestic league appearances and goals as of 21 August 2017

Mahmoud Fathi (Arabic: مَحْمُود فَتْحِيّ; born May 7, 1988) is an Egyptian professional footballer who currently plays as a defensive midfielder for the Egyptian club El Raja SC. In August 2015, Fathi signed a 3-year 700,000 EGP contract for Smouha SC coming from Enppi, 4 months later he was loaned to El Dakhleya after the manager Moamen Soliman declared that he doesn't need the player.
