= Hesham Fathallah =

Egyptian footballer (born 1990)

Personal information
- Date of birth: February 11, 1990 (age 36)
- Position: Central midfielder

Team information
- Current team: El Raja SC

Senior career*
Years	Team	Apps	(Gls)
–2015	Smouha	65	(3)
2015–2016	Pharco		
2016–2017	Petrojet	7	(0)
2017–	El Raja SC		
- * Club domestic league appearances and goals as of 26 August 2017

Hesham Fathallah (Arabic: هِشَام فَتْح الله; born February 11, 1990) is an Egyptian professional footballer who currently plays as a central midfielder for the Egyptian club El Raja SC. Fathallah started his career with Smouha in youth level, and in 2015, he signed a 2-year contract for Pharco in a free transfer from Smouha, but he moved after one year to Petrojet where he played also only one year and then moved to El Raja SC, a promoted team to 2017–18 Egyptian Premier League.

During 2015–16 season in Egyptian Premier League, he got injured and suffered from a skull fracture after his collision with his teammate Ahmad El-Agooz.
