= Mohamed El Baaly =

Egyptian footballer (born 1993)

Mohamed Elbaaly
Personal information
- Full name: Mohamed Ayman El Baaly
- Date of birth: June 10, 1993 (age 33)
- Position: Centre-back

Team information
- Current team: El Raja SC

Youth career
- Ismaily SC

Senior career*
Years	Team	Apps	(Gls)
–2015	Ismaily SC	17	(0)
2015–2017	Ghazl El Mahalla SC		
2017–	El Raja SC		
- * Club domestic league appearances and goals as of 14 August 2017

Mohamed Ayman El Baaly (Arabic: محمد أيمن البعلي; born June 10, 1993) is an Egyptian professional footballer who currently plays as a centre-back for the Egyptian club El Raja SC.
