= Ahmed Sabry (footballer) =

Egyptian footballer (born 1985)

Personal information
- Full name: Ahmed Sabry Mohamed Abdel Fatah
- Date of birth: 23 June 1985 (age 41)
- Position: Right midfielder

Team information
- Current team: El Raja SC

Senior career*
Years	Team	Apps	(Gls)
–2012	El Sharkia		
2012–2016	Haras El Hodoud SC		
2016–2017	Tala'ea El-Gaish		
2017–	El Raja SC		
- * Club domestic league appearances and goals as of 29 August 2017

Ahmed Sabry Mohamed Abdel Fatah (Arabic: أَحْمَد صَبْرِيّ مُحَمَّد عَبْد الْفَتَّاح; born 23 June 1985) is an Egyptian professional footballer who currently plays as a right midfielder for the Egyptian club El Raja SC.

Sabry previously played for El Sharkia, Haras El Hodoud, and Tala'ea El-Gaish. In July 2017, he moved to El-Entag El-Harby in a free transfer with 2-year contract, but after few days, Sabry and El-Entag reached an agreement to cancel the contract. In August 2017, he signed a 2-year contract for El Raja SC, a promoted team to 2017–18 Egyptian Premier League.
