= Omar Effendi =

Egyptian chain of department stores

Omar Effendi عمر أفندي

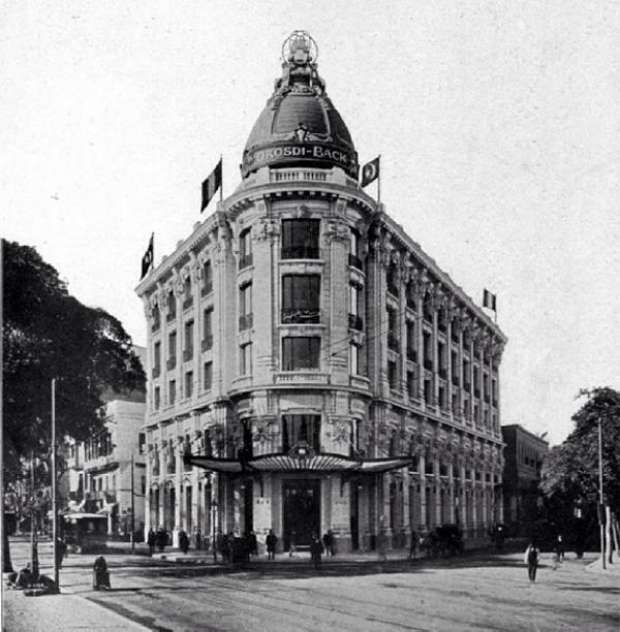
- The flagship store in Downtown Cairo
- Formerly: Orosdi-Back (1856–1921)
- Company type: State-owned enterprise
- Industry: Retail
- Founded: 1856; 170 years ago
- Founder: Leon Orosdi; Philippe Orosdi; Hermann Back; Joseph Back
- Headquarters: Cairo, Egypt
- Number of locations: 82
- Area served: Egypt
- Key people: Ayman Salem (chairman)
- Owner: Holding Company for Tourism, Hotels and Trade
- Website: omareffendi.com.eg

Omar Effendi (Arabic: عمر أفندي) is a chain of department stores in Egypt that was founded in 1856 by Leon Orosdi and Hermann Back as Orosdi-Back. The chain has 82 branches across Egypt and is owned by the Holding Company for Tourism, Hotels and Trade a branch of the Ministry of Public Business Sector.

== History ==
Omar Effendi has its origins as Orosdi-Back founded in Constantinople (now Istanbul) in 1855 by Austro-Hungarian Jews Leo Orosdi, Philippe Orosdi, Hermann Back and Joseph Back. In 1856 the Cairo branch was opened.

The companies headquarters were moved from Istanbul to Paris, France in 1888. Also by 1888 the chain had two other stores around Egypt in Alexandria and Tanta. They also had stores internationally in Bulgaria (Philippopoli), Greece (Salonica), Romania (Bucharest), Tunisia (Tunis) and Turkey (Izmir - closed in 1934).

Later on the company also had two other stores in Tunisia (Bizerte and Sfax) along with this they later had stores in Iraq (Baghdad), Lebanon (Beirut) and Syria (Aleppo).

From 1905 to 1906 a flagship was built on the corner of Abdel Aziz Street and Roushdy Basha in Downtown Cairo, the six floor rococo style building was designed by French architect Raoul Brandon. The chain was purchased in 1921 by a Jewish Egyptian merchant and renamed from Orosdi-Back to Omar Effendi.

The store in Istanbul was sold to Sümerbank in 1943.

Under Gamal Abdel Nasser the company was nationalised in 1957. Later in 1967 the company became a joint-stock company affiliated with the Holding Company for Trade.

In 2004, Omar Effendi branches put to the private sector to participate in the management of some branches in full, such as the Fayoum branch in favor of the Oriental Weavers Company, the Workers’ University branch in favor of the “Ceramics and Chinese Company”, the 26th of July branch for the “Egyptian Center for Engineering and Trade” And Tharwat branch in favor of “Misr Italia Company for Ready-made Garments".

In 2006 a 90% stake in the company was sold to Anwal a Saudi Arabia based company for EGP£589.5 million the government kept a 10% stake in the chain. They later sold an 85% stake in the company in 2010 for EGP£320 million to Arabiyya Lel Estithmaraat an Egyptian investment firm at the time the Egyptian government owned 10% and the World Bank owned 5% of the company. However in 2011 the Egyptian Administrative Court rolled back the sale to Anwal in 2006 and the chain once again became state owned.

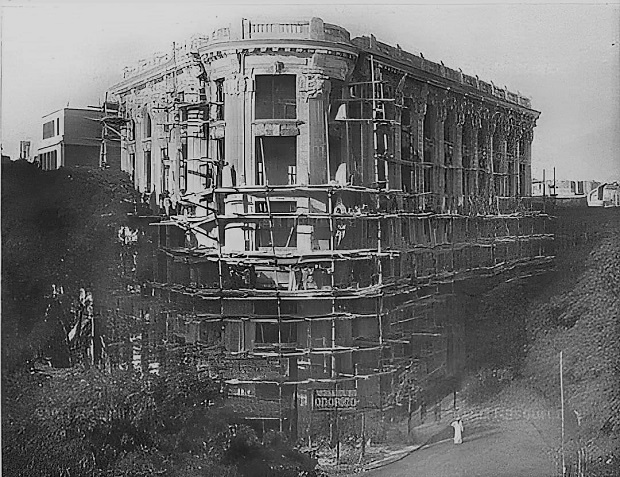
The flagship store during construction

In 2021 the company partnered with the Majid Al Futtaim Group to open 14 Carrefour stores within Omar Effendi locations.

== Photo gallery ==
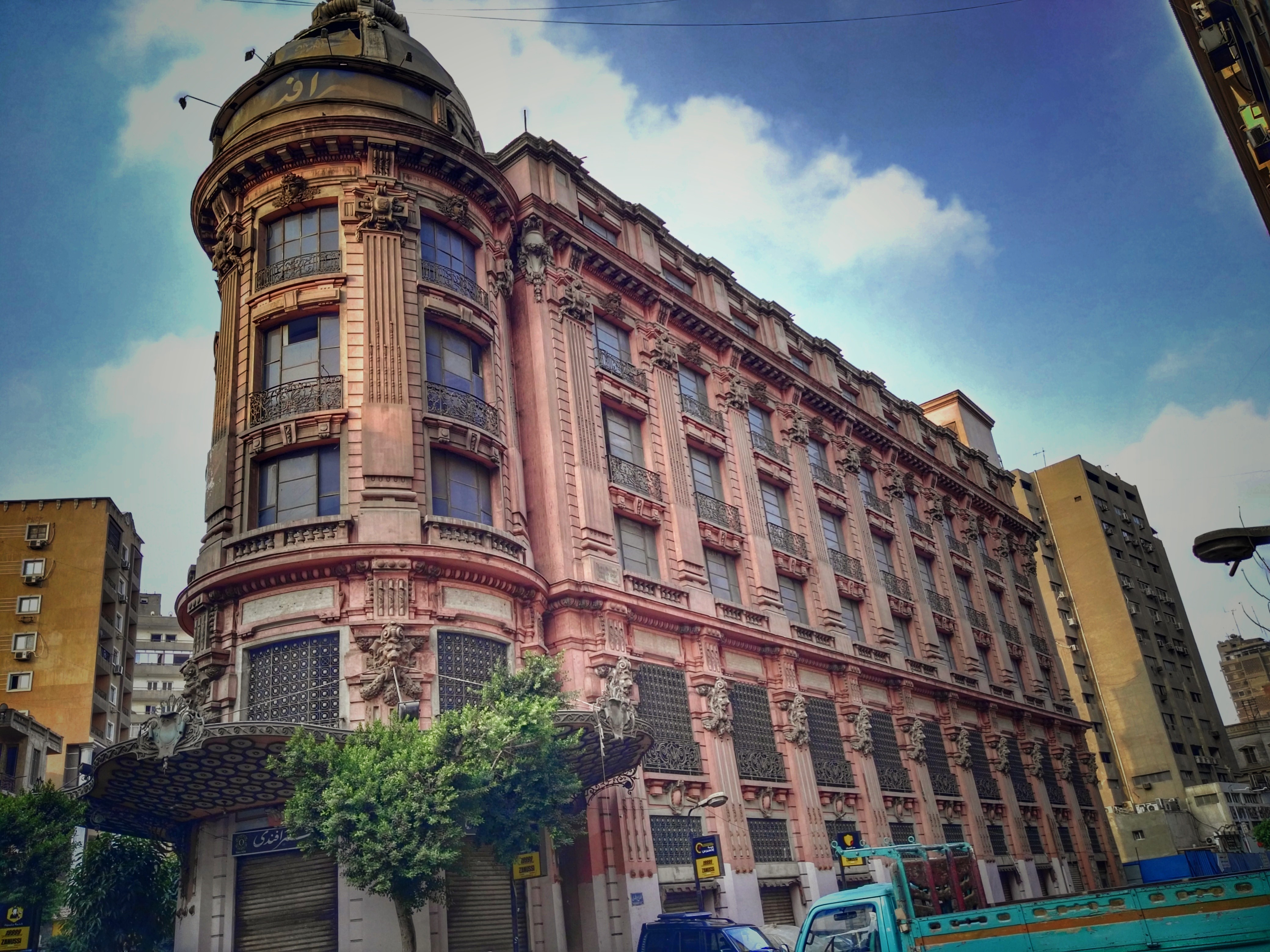
Headquarters in Cairo

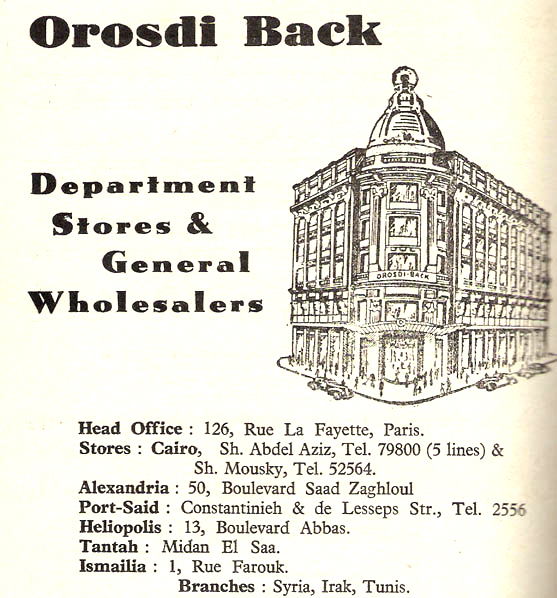
Orosdi Back advertising

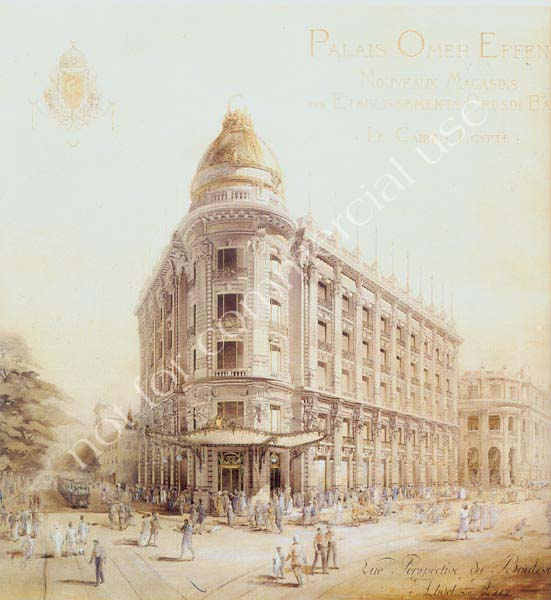
Headquarters in Orosdi Back Cairo in 1876

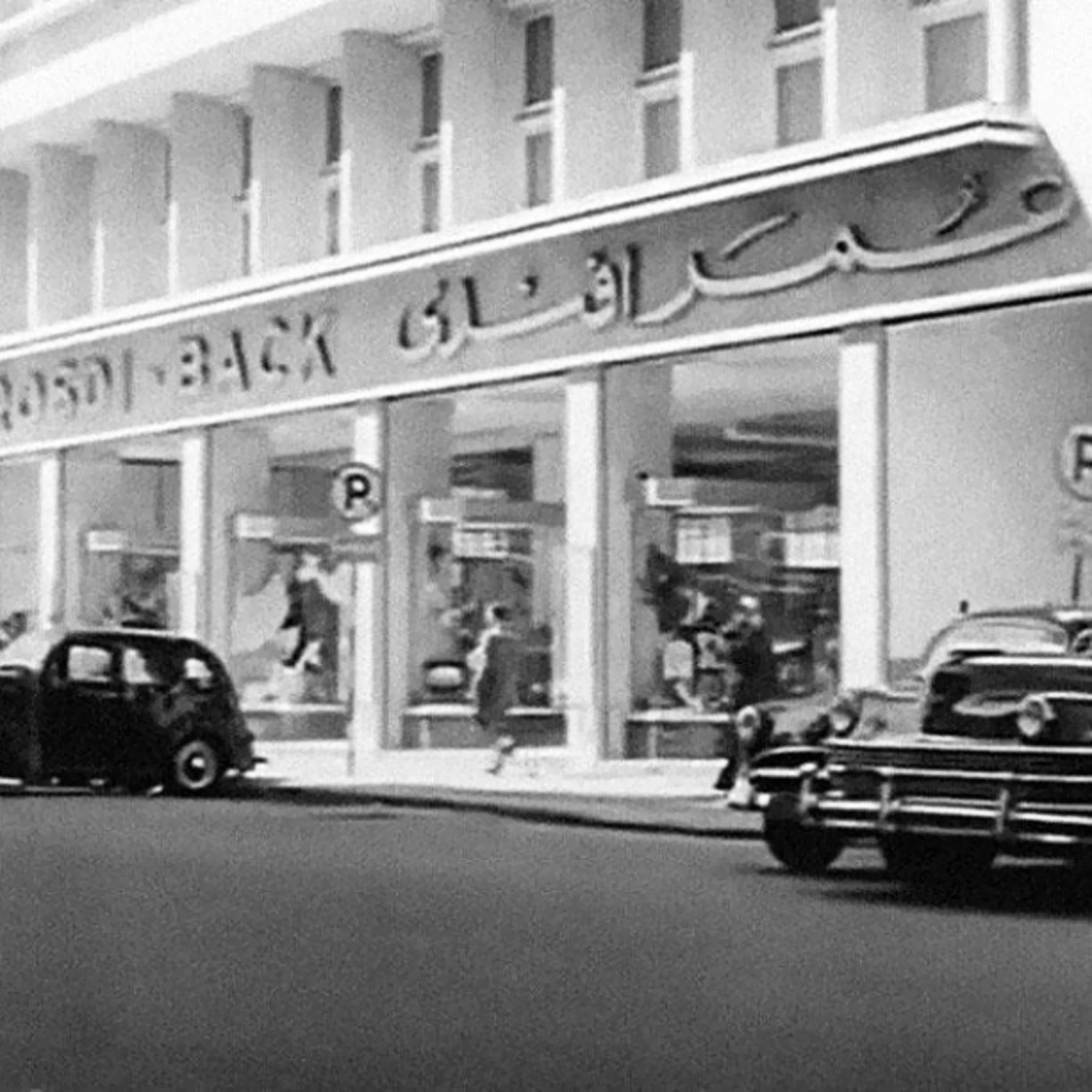
A branch in Cairo in 1940

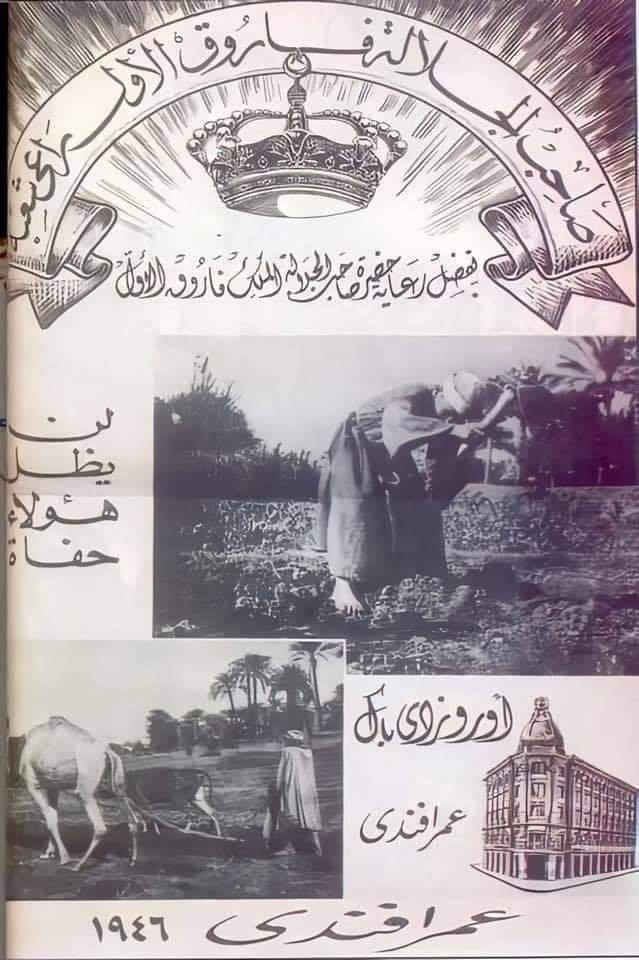
Omar Effendi advertising in 1946

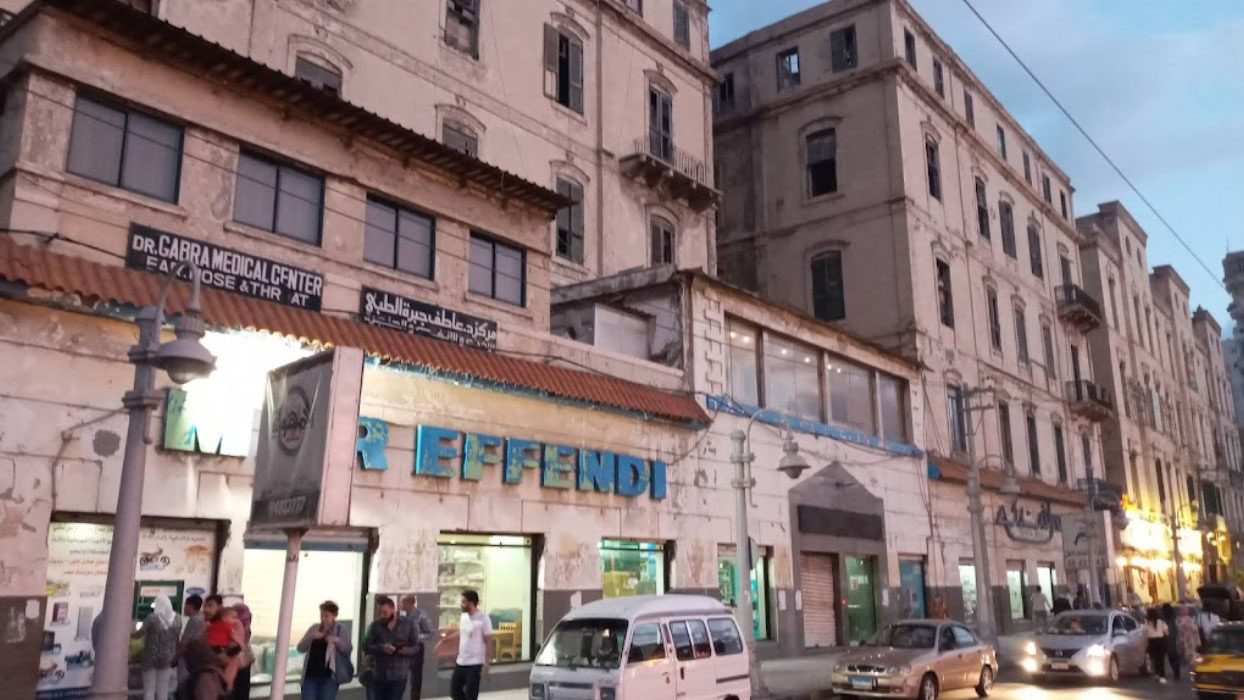
Raml Station Branch in Alexandria

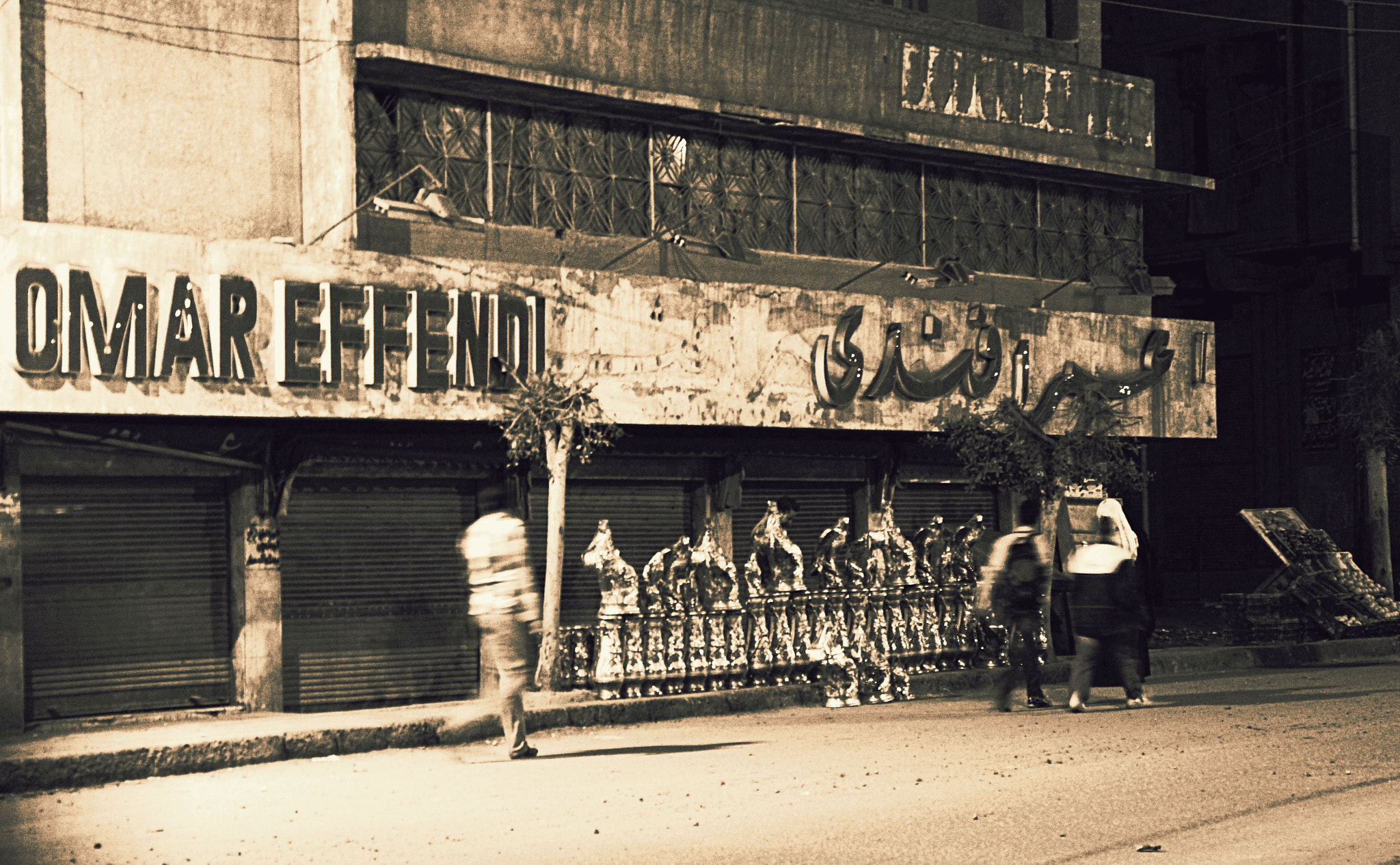
A branch in Mansoura

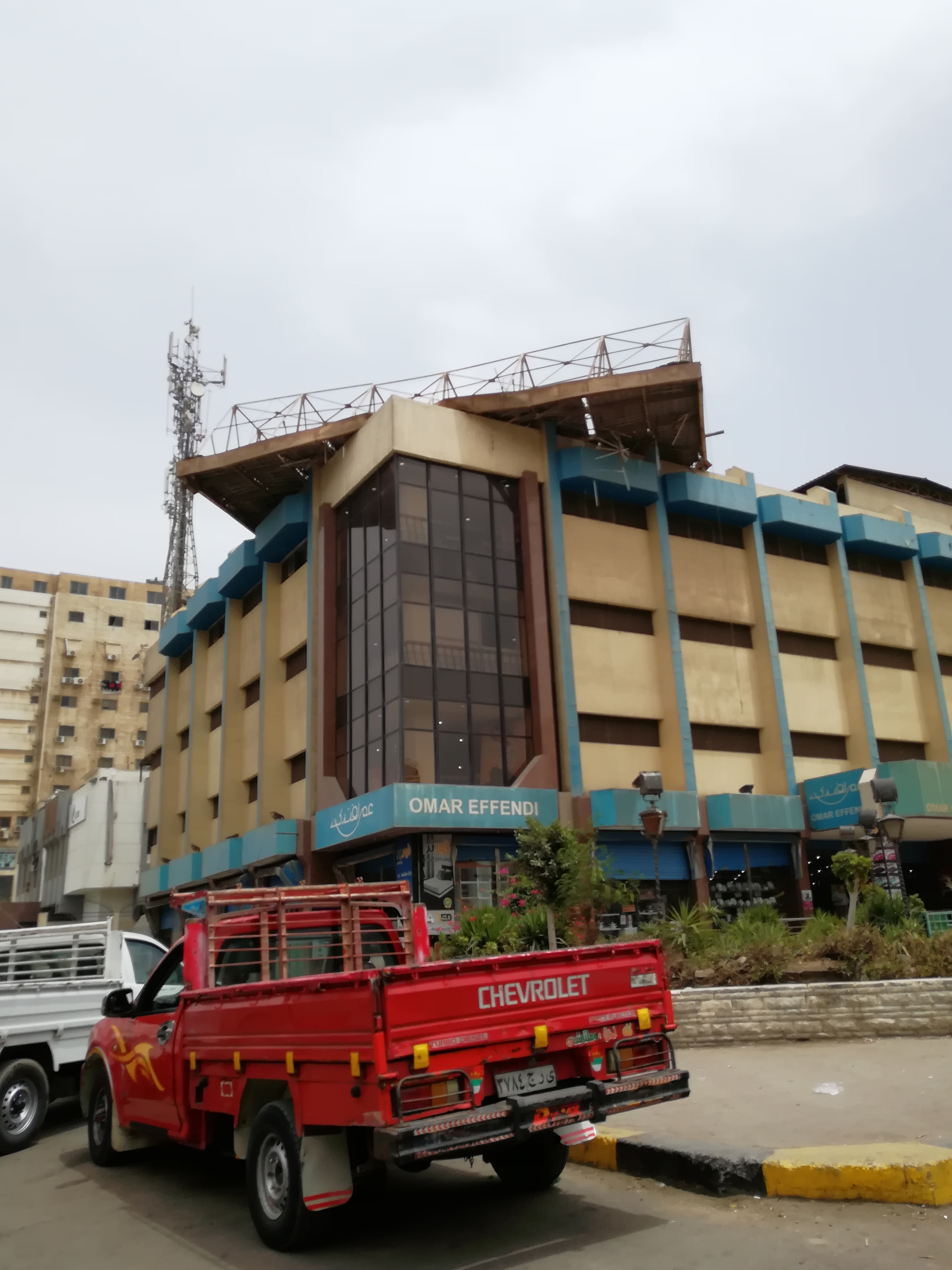
Makram Ebeid Branch in Cairo

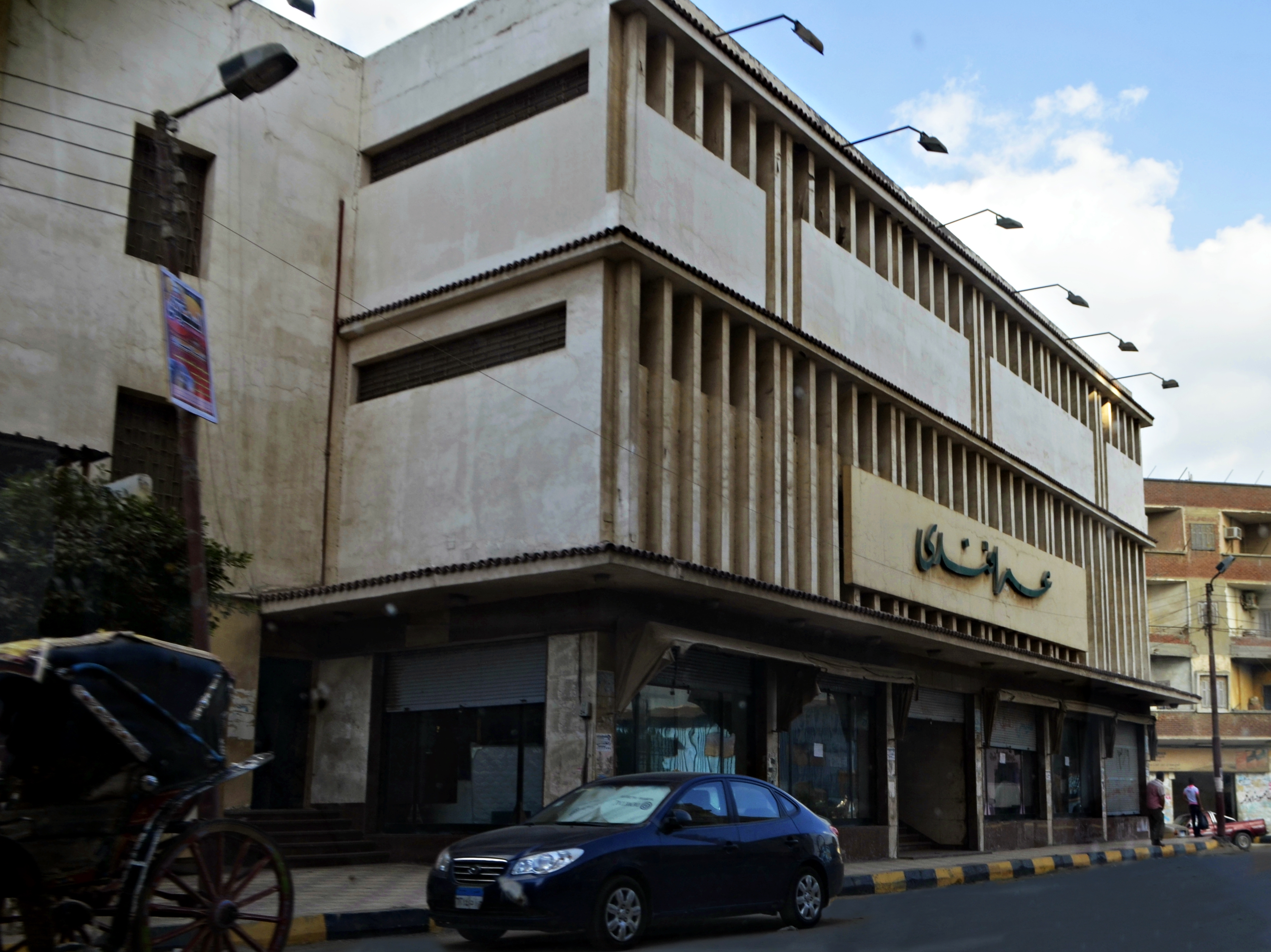
A branch in Desouk

== See also ==
- List of supermarket chains in Egypt.
- Economy of Egypt.
