= Ibrahim Helal =

Egyptian footballer (born 1990)

Ibrahim Helal Shehata
Personal information
- Date of birth: February 28, 1990 (age 36)
- Height: 1.66 m (5 ft 5 in)
- Position: Defensive midfielder

Team information
- Current team: El Raja SC

Senior career*
Years	Team	Apps	(Gls)
–2010	Senbellawein		
2010–2014	Wadi Degla		
2014–2015	Al Ittihad Alexandria		
2015–	El Raja SC		
- * Club domestic league appearances and goals as of 23 August 2017

Ibrahim Helal Shehata (Arabic: إبراهيم هلال شحاتة; born February 28, 1990) is an Egyptian professional footballer who currently plays as a defensive midfielder for the Egyptian club El Raja SC. In 2014, Helal signed a 2-year contract for Alexandria's club Al Ittihad in a free transfer from Wadi Degla, he then asked to leave the club since he felt ignorance. He then moved to Marsa Matruh's club El Raja SC.
