= Ali El-Araby =

Egyptian footballer (born 1989)

Aly El-Araby
Personal information
- Full name: Aly Mohamed Mohamed Ahmed
- Date of birth: January 1, 1989 (age 37)
- Place of birth: Asyut, Egypt
- Height: 1.69 m (5 ft 7 in)
- Positions: Full back; winger

Team information
- Current team: ENPPI
- Number: 37

Youth career
- ENPPI

Senior career*
Years	Team	Apps	(Gls)
2010–2012	ENPPI		
2012–2014	Asyut Petroleum		
2014–	El Raja		

International career
2008–2009	Egypt U-20	53	(2)
2011	Egypt U-23		
- * Club domestic league appearances and goals

Aly Mohamed Ahmed (Arabic: علي محمد أحمد) (born 1 January 1989) is an Egyptian footballer who plays as a full back or winger for Egyptian Premier League club ENPPI as well as the Egypt U-20 national team.

== International career ==
Aly currently plays for the Egyptian U-23 national youth team. He led the right flank line in all Egypt's matches the 2009 FIFA U-20 World Cup that was hosted by Egypt from September 25 to October 16.
