= 2017–18 Egyptian Premier League =

Egyptian Premier League
- Season: 2017–18
- Dates: 8 September 2017 – 21 May 2018
- Champions: Al Ahly; 40th Premier League title
- Relegated: El Raja; Tanta; Al Nasr
- Champions League: Al Ahly; Ismaily
- Confederation Cup: Al Masry; Zamalek (as Egypt Cup winners)
- Matches: 306
- Goals: 718 (2.35 per match)
- Top goalscorer: Walid Azaro (18 goals)
- Biggest home win: Ismaily 5–0 El Raja (27 December 2017); Al Ahly 5–0 Al Nasr (19 February 2018)
- Biggest away win: Tala'ea El Gaish 0–4 Al Masry (28 September 2017); Al Nasr 0–4 Al Ahly (2 January 2018)
- Highest scoring: Al Masry 6–3 Tanta (28 December 2017); Tala'ea El Gaish 4–5 Al Mokawloon (23 April 2018)
- Longest winning run: 16 games Al Ahly
- Longest unbeaten run: 22 games Al Ahly
- Longest winless run: 15 games Tanta; Al Nasr
- Longest losing run: 5 games Tala'ea El Gaish; El Raja; Tanta; Al Nasr

The 2017–18 Egyptian Premier League (also known as the Telecom Egypt Premier League for sponsorship reasons) was the 59th season of the Egyptian Premier League, the top Egyptian professional league for association football clubs, since its establishment in 1948. The season started on 8 September 2017 and concluded on 20 May 2018. Fixtures for the 2017–18 season were announced on 30 August 2017.

Al Ahly won and secured their record-extending fortieth Egyptian Premier League title with six games to spare, following Al Masry's 0–0 draw with El Entag El Harby on 12 March 2018. The team broke numerous league records over the course of the season, including: most points (88), most wins (28) and most goals scored (75). Al Ahly were the defending champions and successfully defended it, while Al Assiouty Sport, Al Nasr and El Raja have entered as the promoted teams from the 2016–17 Egyptian Second Division.

== Teams ==
Locations of the 2017–18 Egyptian Premier League teams

A total of eighteen teams will compete in the league - the top fifteen teams from the previous season, and three teams promoted from the Second Division.

=== Stadia ===
Note: Table lists in alphabetical order.

Team	Location	Stadium
Al Ahly	Cairo	Cairo International Stadium
Al Assiouty Sport	Assiut	Al Assiouty Sport Stadium
El Dakhleya	Cairo	Police Academy Stadium
ENPPI	Cairo	Petro Sport Stadium
El Entag El Harby	Cairo	Al Salam Stadium
Ismaily	Ismailia	Ismailia Stadium
Al Ittihad	Alexandria	Alexandria Stadium
Al Masry	Port Said	Borg El Arab Stadium
Misr Lel Makkasa	Fayoum	Fayoum Stadium
Al Mokawloon	Cairo	Osman Ahmed Osman Stadium
Al Nasr	Cairo	Cairo International Stadium
Petrojet	Suez	Suez Stadium
El Raja	Mersa Matruh	Tolip Stadium
Smouha	Alexandria	Alexandria Stadium
Tala'ea El Gaish	Cairo	Cairo Military Academy Stadium
Tanta	Tanta	Tanta Stadium
Wadi Degla	Cairo	30 June Stadium
Zamalek	Cairo	Cairo International Stadium

=== Personnel and kits ===
Team	Manager	Captain	Kit manufacturer	Shirt sponsor
Al Ahly	(Egypt) Ahmed Ayoub (caretaker)	(Egypt) Hossam Ashour	Sporta	Huawei, Vodafone, Juhayna,^{1} Royal Dutch Shell,^{1} Egyptian Steel^{2}
Al Assiouty Sport	(Egypt) Ali Maher	(Egypt) Ahmed Said	ABM	Oppo, Telecom Egypt, SAIB,^{1} Universal,^{1} El Kasarawy Group^{2}
El Dakhleya	(Egypt) Alaa Abdel Aal	(Egypt) Rashad Farouk	Reebok	Oppo, Telecom Egypt, SAIB,^{1} Universal,^{1} El Kasarawy Group^{2}
ENPPI	(Egypt) Khaled Metwalli	(Egypt) Ramy Sabry	Nike	Oppo, Telecom Egypt, SAIB,^{1} Universal,^{1} El Kasarawy Group^{2}
El Entag El Harby	(Egypt) Mokhtar Mokhtar	(Egypt) Amer Mohamed	Uhlsport	Oppo, Telecom Egypt, SAIB,^{1} Universal,^{1} El Kasarawy Group^{2}
Ismaily	(Portugal) Pedro Barny	(Egypt) Hosny Abd Rabo	Sporta	Oppo, Telecom Egypt, SAIB,^{1} Universal,^{1} El Kasarawy Group^{2}
Al Ittihad	(Egypt) Mohamed Omar	(Egypt) El Hany Soliman	Uhlsport	Oppo, Telecom Egypt, SAIB,^{1} Universal,^{1} El Kasarawy Group^{2}
Al Masry	(Egypt) Hossam Hassan	(Egypt) Islam Salah	Adidas	Oppo, Telecom Egypt, SAIB,^{1} Universal,^{1} El Kasarawy Group^{2}
Misr Lel Makkasa	(Egypt) Talaat Youssef	(Egypt) Ahmed Samy	Legea	Oppo, Telecom Egypt, SAIB,^{1} Universal,^{1} El Kasarawy Group^{2}
Al Mokawloon	(Egypt) Alaa Nabil	(Egypt) Ramy Adel	Legea	Oppo, Telecom Egypt, SAIB,^{1} Universal,^{1} El Kasarawy Group^{2}
Al Nasr	(Egypt) Sayed Eid	(Egypt) Mohamed Hassan	Adidas	Oppo, Telecom Egypt, SAIB,^{1} Universal,^{1} El Kasarawy Group^{2}
Petrojet	(Egypt) Tarek Yehia	(Ethiopia) Shimelis Bekele	Uhlsport	Oppo, Telecom Egypt, SAIB,^{1} Universal,^{1} El Kasarawy Group^{2}
El Raja	(Egypt) Ramadan El Sayed	(Egypt) Mahmoud El Maghriby	Adidas	Oppo, Telecom Egypt, SAIB,^{1} Universal,^{1} El Kasarawy Group^{2}
Smouha	(Egypt) Mimi Abdel Razek	(Egypt) El Sayed Farid	Uhlsport	Oppo, Telecom Egypt, SAIB,^{1} Universal,^{1} El Kasarawy Group^{2}
Tala'ea El Gaish	(Egypt) Mohamed Helmy	(Egypt) Salah Amin	Macron	Oppo, Telecom Egypt, SAIB,^{1} Universal,^{1} El Kasarawy Group^{2}
Tanta	(Egypt) Emad El Nahhas	(Egypt) Mostafa Amin	Uhlsport	Oppo, Telecom Egypt, SAIB,^{1} Universal,^{1} El Kasarawy Group^{2}
Wadi Degla	(Egypt) Tarek El Ashry	(Egypt) El Sayed Salem	Joma	Neopolis
Zamalek	(Egypt) Khaled Galal	(Egypt) Hazem Emam	Joma	Oppo, Telecom Egypt, Lactel,^{1} El Kasarawy Group^{2}

1. On the back of shirt.
2. On the sleeves.

=== Managerial changes ===
Team	Outgoing manager	Manner of departure	Date of vacancy	Position in table	Incoming manager	Date of appointment
Al Assiouty Sport	(Egypt) Ayman El Mezaien	Signed by FC Masr	17 April 2017	Pre-season	(Egypt) Ali Maher	4 May 2017
El Raja	(Egypt) Nabil Mahmoud	Sacked	8 June 2017	Pre-season	(Egypt) Khaled El Kamash	10 June 2017
Smouha	(Egypt) Moamen Soliman	End of contract	30 June 2017	Pre-season	(Czech Republic) František Straka	22 July 2017
Al Ittihad	(Spain) Juan José Maqueda	End of contract	30 June 2017	Pre-season	(Egypt) Hany Ramzy	19 August 2017
Ismaily	(Egypt) Abou Talib El Essawy	Mutual consent	10 July 2017	Pre-season	(France) Sébastien Desabre	10 July 2017
Zamalek	(Portugal) Augusto Inácio	Sacked	27 July 2017	Pre-season	(Montenegro) Nebojša Jovović	28 August 2017
Misr Lel Makkasa	(Egypt) Ehab Galal	Mutual consent	3 August 2017	Pre-season	(Egypt) Moamen Soliman	3 August 2017
El Raja	(Egypt) Khaled El Kamash	Resigned	27 September 2017	18th	(Egypt) Emad El Nahhas	28 September 2017
ENPPI	(Egypt) Tarek El Ashry	Resigned	15 October 2017	16th	(Egypt) Ehab Galal	15 October 2017
Misr Lel Makkasa	(Egypt) Moamen Soliman	Resigned	19 October 2017	17th	(Egypt) Emad Soliman	22 October 2017
Al Ittihad	(Egypt) Hany Ramzy	Sacked	21 October 2017	10th	(France) Jean-Michel Cavalli	21 October 2017
Tala'ea El Gaish	(Egypt) Ahmed Samy	Resigned	27 November 2017	13th	(Egypt) Helmy Toulan	29 November 2017
Smouha	(Czech Republic) František Straka	Resigned	30 November 2017	6th	(Egypt) Mimi Abdel Razek (caretaker)	30 November 2017
Tanta	(Egypt) Khaled Eid	Resigned	3 December 2017	14th	(Egypt) Osama Orabi	3 December 2017
Wadi Degla	(Egypt) Mido	Resigned	3 December 2017	17th	(Egypt) Tarek El Ashry	5 December 2017
Smouha	(Egypt) Mimi Abdel Razek	End of caretaker spell	9 December 2017	4th	(Egypt) Talaat Youssef	9 December 2017
Al Ittihad	(France) Jean-Michel Cavalli	Sacked	11 December 2017	11th	(Spain) Juan José Maqueda	16 December 2017
El Raja	(Egypt) Emad El Nahhas	Sacked	24 December 2017	18th	(Egypt) Ahmed El Agouz	24 December 2017
Ismaily	(France) Sébastien Desabre	Signed by Uganda	28 December 2017	1st	(Egypt) Abou Talib El Essawy	30 December 2017
El Raja	(Egypt) Ahmed El Agouz	Resigned	30 December 2017	18th	(Egypt) Ramadan El Sayed	31 December 2017
Petrojet	(Egypt) Mohamed Youssef	Mutual consent	31 December 2017	13th	(Egypt) Tarek Yehia	1 January 2018
Zamalek	(Montenegro) Nebojša Jovović	Sacked	3 January 2018	4th	(Egypt) Ehab Galal	6 January 2018
ENPPI	(Egypt) Ehab Galal	Signed by Zamalek	6 January 2018	5th	(Egypt) Tarek Abdullah (Note: Tarek Abdullah was initially appointed as caretaker manager on 6 January 2018 until the signing of a new manager. On 14 January 2018, ENPPI announced that Abdullah would lead the team until the end of the 2017–18 season.)	6 January 2018
Ismaily	(Egypt) Abou Talib El Essawy	Resigned	22 January 2018	2nd	(Egypt) Mohamed Abou Griesha	25 January 2018
Ismaily	(Egypt) Mohamed Abou Griesha	Appointed as assistant coach	1 February 2018	2nd	(Portugal) Pedro Barny	1 February 2018
Al Ittihad	(Spain) Juan José Maqueda	Sacked	10 February 2018	14th	(Egypt) Mohamed Omar	11 February 2018
Smouha	(Egypt) Talaat Youssef	Resigned	11 February 2018	5th	(Egypt) Mimi Abdel Razek	12 February 2018
ENPPI	(Egypt) Tarek Abdullah	Resigned	11 February 2018	6th	(Egypt) Khaled Metwalli	12 February 2018
Misr Lel Makkasa	(Egypt) Emad Soliman	Resigned	12 February 2018	13th	(Egypt) Talaat Youssef	17 February 2018
Tanta	(Egypt) Osama Orabi	Sacked	28 February 2018	16th	(Egypt) Emad El Nahhas	1 March 2018
Tala'ea El Gaish	(Egypt) Helmy Toulan	Resigned	8 March 2018	12th	(Egypt) Mohamed Helmy	10 March 2018
Zamalek	(Egypt) Ehab Galal	Sacked	12 April 2018	3rd	(Egypt) Khaled Galal (Note: Khaled Galal was initially appointed as caretaker manager on 13 April 2018 until the end of the season. On 7 May 2018, Zamalek announced that Galal would lead the team until the end of the 2018–19 season.)	13 April 2018
Al Mokawloon	(Egypt) Mohamed Ouda	Resigned	14 April 2018	10th	(Egypt) Alaa Nabil	14 April 2018
Al Ahly	(Egypt) Hossam El Badry	Resigned	15 May 2018	1st	(Egypt) Ahmed Ayoub (caretaker)	15 May 2018

== Results ==
=== League table ===
Pos	Team	Pld	W	D	L	GF	GA	GD	Pts	Qualification or relegation
1	Al Ahly (C)	34	28	4	2	75	19	+56	88	Qualification for the Champions League
2	Ismaily	34	19	11	4	50	27	+23	68	Qualification for the Champions League
3	Al Masry	34	18	9	7	52	34	+18	63	Qualification for the Confederation Cup (Note: Zamalek qualified for the Confederation Cup by winning the 2017–18 Egypt Cup.)
4	Zamalek	34	18	7	9	45	30	+15	61	Qualification for the Confederation Cup
5	Smouha	34	14	9	11	37	26	+11	51	
6	ENPPI	34	12	14	8	39	38	+1	50	
7	El Entag El Harby	34	12	11	11	36	36	0	47	
8	Misr Lel Makkasa	34	12	10	12	48	44	+4	46	
9	Al Assiouty Sport	34	10	12	12	43	41	+2	42 (Note: Head-to-head results: Al Assiouty Sport 1–1 Al Mokawloon Al Arab, Al Mokawloon Al Arab 1–1 Al Assiouty Sport (tied on head-to-head results, ranked on overall goal difference).)	
10	Al Mokawloon Al Arab	34	10	12	12	42	49	−7	42	
11	Al Ittihad	34	9	14	11	41	43	−2	41	
12	Petrojet	34	9	11	14	32	40	−8	38 (Note: Head-to-head results: Petrojet 2–0 Tala'ea El Gaish, Tala'ea El Gaish 1–2 Petrojet.)	
13	Tala'ea El Gaish	34	9	11	14	26	42	−16	38	
14	El Dakhleya	34	8	13	13	37	46	−9	37	
15	Wadi Degla	34	8	10	16	31	46	−15	34	
16	El Raja (R)	34	5	12	17	24	53	−29	27	Relegation to the Second Division
17	Tanta (R)	34	4	14	16	27	44	−17	26	Relegation to the Second Division
18	Al Nasr (R)	34	4	10	20	33	60	−27	22	Relegation to the Second Division

Source: Soccerway
Rules for classification: 1) Points; 2) Head-to-Head points; 3) Head-to-Head goal difference; 4) Head-to-Head goal scored; 5) Head-to-Head away goal scored; 6) Goal difference; 7) Goal scored.
(C) Champions; (R) Relegated

=== Positions by round ===
The table lists the positions of teams after each week of matches. In order to preserve chronological evolvements, any postponed matches are not included in the round at which they were originally scheduled, but added to the full round they were played immediately afterwards. For example, if a match is scheduled for matchday 13, but then postponed and played between days 16 and 17, it will be added to the standings for day 16.

Team \ Round	1	2	3	4	5	6	7	8	9	10	11	12	13	14	15	16	17	18	19	20	21	22	23	24	25	26	27	28	29	30	31	32	33	34
Al Ahly	10	12	14	16	7	7	13	14	6	4	3	2	2	2	2	2	2	1	1	1	1	1	1	1	1	1	1	1	1	1	1	1	1	1
Ismaily	2	4	1	6	3	1	1	1	1	1	1	1	1	1	1	1	1	2	2	2	2	2	2	2	2	3	3	2	2	2	2	2	2	2
Al Masry	3	1	4	2	1	2	3	2	2	2	2	3	3	3	3	3	3	3	3	3	3	3	3	4	4	4	4	4	4	4	4	4	4	3
Zamalek	7	3	3	3	4	5	5	3	3	3	5	5	5	4	4	4	4	5	4	5	5	4	4	3	3	2	2	3	3	3	3	3	3	4
Smouha	6	6	5	5	5	3	4	5	5	6	6	4	4	8	6	6	6	4	6	4	4	5	5	5	5	5	5	6	5	5	5	5	5	5
ENPPI	12	13	16	15	16	14	9	9	8	7	7	9	7	6	5	5	5	6	5	6	6	6	7	8	7	6	6	5	6	6	6	7	6	6
El Entag El Harby	9	9	7	4	6	6	8	11	13	10	8	8	11	9	9	9	9	9	8	8	8	8	8	6	6	7	7	7	7	7	7	6	7	7
Misr Lel Makkasa	5	11	15	17	17	17	17	16	16	13	10	7	8	7	10	10	11	11	12	11	11	13	13	13	13	13	13	14	14	13	8	9	8	8
Al Assiouty Sport	11	5	9	11	13	13	14	10	12	14	15	12	10	11	8	11	13	13	10	12	12	12	11	12	12	11	11	10	11	12	11	8	10	9
Al Mokawloon	1	2	2	1	2	4	2	4	4	5	4	6	6	5	7	8	8	8	7	7	7	7	9	9	8	8	8	8	8	8	10	11	9	10
Al Ittihad	17	8	11	7	11	10	11	13	14	15	14	11	15	16	15	14	14	14	14	14	14	14	15	14	15	14	14	11	12	10	9	10	11	11
Petrojet	8	15	8	8	9	8	6	8	7	8	9	10	9	10	11	13	12	12	13	13	13	11	12	10	10	9	9	9	9	9	12	12	12	12
Tala'ea El Gaish	4	10	6	10	12	12	7	7	11	12	13	15	12	12	13	7	7	7	9	10	10	9	6	7	9	10	10	12	10	11	13	13	13	13
El Dakhleya	13	17	17	12	8	11	12	12	9	11	12	13	13	13	12	12	10	10	11	9	9	10	10	11	11	12	12	13	13	14	14	14	14	14
Wadi Degla	16	7	12	13	14	15	15	15	15	16	16	17	17	14	14	15	15	16	16	16	16	16	14	15	14	15	15	15	15	15	15	15	15	15
El Raja	18	18	18	18	18	18	18	18	18	18	18	18	18	18	18	18	18	18	18	18	18	18	17	17	17	17	17	17	17	17	17	17	17	16
Tanta	15	16	10	9	10	9	10	6	10	9	11	14	14	15	16	17	17	15	15	15	15	15	16	16	16	16	16	16	16	16	16	16	16	17
Al Nasr	14	14	13	14	15	16	16	17	17	17	17	16	16	17	17	16	16	17	17	17	17	17	18	18	18	18	18	18	18	18	18	18	18	18

Source: Soccerway

Leader
2018–19 CAF Champions League
2018–19 CAF Confederation Cup
Relegation to 2018–19 Egyptian Second Division

=== Results table ===
Home \ Away	AHL	ASY	DKH	ENP	ENT	ISM	ITH	MAS	MMK	MOK	NAS	PET	RAJ	SMO	TGS	TNT	WDG	ZAM
Al Ahly	—	1–0	2–0	4–1	2–1	1–0	2–0	2–0	2–1	5–2	5–0	3–0	4–1	2–1	1–1	2–1	1–0	1–2
Al Assiouty Sport	0–1	—	4–2	1–1	3–1	0–2	1–1	1–2	1–1	1–1	5–1	3–2	3–1	0–0	1–1	2–1	0–2	0–1
El Dakhleya	0–3	2–0	—	1–2	0–1	0–0	2–2	0–3	2–1	1–2	1–1	1–1	2–0	0–0	1–2	2–0	1–1	1–2
ENPPI	0–1	0–0	3–3	—	2–0	2–0	2–0	2–1	2–1	3–2	1–1	0–2	2–0	1–1	1–1	3–1	1–0	0–0
El Entag El Harby	1–2	1–0	1–1	1–1	—	0–1	3–2	1–1	1–0	2–3	1–1	2–1	2–1	0–0	1–0	1–0	2–0	1–1
Ismaily	0–2	1–1	2–1	1–1	2–0	—	0–0	1–1	2–1	1–1	2–0	0–0	5–0	1–0	1–1	2–2	2–1	3–1
Al Ittihad	0–3	2–0	2–1	1–1	1–1	2–4	—	0–1	2–2	1–1	3–0	2–2	0–0	2–0	0–0	1–1	4–0	0–2
Al Masry	0–2	3–1	1–1	1–1	0–0	1–2	0–2	—	3–2	1–0	2–1	2–1	0–0	2–1	0–0	6–3	1–0	1–2
Misr Lel Makkasa	3–2	0–0	2–2	0–0	3–1	1–4	2–0	1–4	—	0–2	1–4	2–0	3–0	2–0	4–0	0–0	2–0	1–0
Al Mokawloon	0–3	1–1	1–1	2–2	1–1	2–0	3–2	1–2	0–1	—	2–2	2–0	3–0	0–3	0–2	1–1	0–0	0–0
Al Nasr	0–4	2–2	0–0	1–2	0–1	2–3	2–3	2–3	0–1	1–2	—	0–1	3–1	0–2	1–0	1–2	0–1	1–2
Petrojet	1–2	1–2	1–1	1–0	1–0	0–1	2–0	0–1	0–0	1–1	2–0	—	0–1	2–1	2–0	1–1	2–2	1–3
El Raja	1–3	0–2	0–1	3–0	0–2	0–0	2–2	0–0	1–1	1–0	0–0	1–1	—	0–0	1–0	0–1	3–3	1–1
Smouha	0–0	1–3	1–0	4–0	2–1	1–2	1–1	3–2	1–0	3–0	1–1	0–0	1–0	—	0–1	2–0	2–1	0–1
Tala'ea El Gaish	0–2	2–1	0–2	1–0	2–2	1–1	0–0	0–4	1–0	4–5	1–3	1–2	2–1	0–1	—	0–0	0–0	1–0
Tanta	1–1	1–1	1–2	0–1	0–2	0–1	0–1	1–2	3–3	0–1	0–0	0–0	0–0	1–0	0–1	—	3–1	1–1
Wadi Degla	1–1	0–2	1–2	2–1	2–1	1–2	1–0	0–0	3–3	2–0	1–1	2–1	2–3	0–1	1–0	0–0	—	0–3
Zamalek	0–3	2–1	3–0	0–0	0–0	0–1	1–2	0–1	1–3	1–0	2–1	3–0	4–1	0–3	3–0	2–1	1–0	—

Source: Soccerway
Legend: Blue = home team win; Yellow = draw; Red = away team win.
For upcoming matches, an "a" indicates there is an article about the rivalry between the two participants.

== Season statistics ==
=== Top goalscorers ===
Rank	Player	Club	Goals
1	(Morocco) Walid Azaro	Al Ahly	18
2	(Ghana) John Antwi	Misr Lel Makkasa	16
3	(Colombia) Diego Calderón	Ismaily	14
4	(Egypt) Omar Said (Note: O. Said transferred from El Entag El Harby to Wadi Degla during the winter break.)	El Entag El Harby/Wadi Degla	13
5	(Egypt) Ahmed Gomaa	Al Masry	12
6	(Egypt) Ahmed Ali	Al Mokawloon	11
7	(Democratic Republic of the Congo) Kabongo Kasongo	Zamalek	10
7	(Egypt) Abdallah Said	Al Ahly	10
9	(Nigeria) Junior Ajayi	Al Ahly	9
9	(Egypt) Salah Amin	Tala'ea El Gaish	9
9	(Egypt) Khaled Kamar (Note: Kamar transferred from Zamalek to El Entag El Harby on loan during the winter break.)	Zamalek/El Entag El Harby	9
9	(Egypt) Salah Mohsen (Note: Mohsen transferred from ENPPI to Al Ahly during the winter break.)	ENPPI/Al Ahly	9
9	(Egypt) Hussein El Shahat (Note: El Shahat transferred from Misr Lel Makkasa to Al Ain during the winter break.)	Misr Lel Makkasa	9
9	(Egypt) Ahmed Shoukry	Al Masry	9

=== Hat-tricks ===
Player	For	Against	Result	Date	Ref
(Egypt) Hussein El Shahat	Misr Lel Makkasa	Tanta	3–3 (A)	26 October 2017	
(Egypt) Hussein El Shahat	Misr Lel Makkasa	Wadi Degla	3–3 (A)	15 November 2017	
(Egypt) Mohamed Hassan	Al Nasr	Misr Lel Makkasa	4–1 (A)	14 December 2017	
(Egypt) Mostafa Mohamed	Tanta	Al Masry	3–6 (A)	28 December 2017	

Note

(H) – Home; (A) – Away

=== Top assists ===
Rank	Player	Club	Assists
1	(Egypt) Abdallah Said	Al Ahly	11
2	(Nigeria) Junior Ajayi	Al Ahly	10
3	(Egypt) Mohamed Farouk	Al Mokawloon	8
3	(Egypt) Ahmed Shoukry	Al Masry	8
5	(Egypt) Mohamed Antar (Note: Antar transferred from Al Assiouty Sport to Zamalek during the winter break.)	Al Assiouty Sport/Zamalek	7
5	(Egypt) El Sayed Salem	Wadi Degla	7
7	(Ghana) John Antwi	Misr Lel Makkasa	6
7	(Egypt) Ibrahim Hassan	Ismaily	6
7	(Egypt) Mohamed Magdy	ENPPI	6
7	(Egypt) Nasser Mansi	El Dakhleya	6
7	(Egypt) Tarek Taha	Smouha	6
