= Mohamed Radwan =

Egyptian football manager (born 1958)

Personal information
- Date of birth: 25 March 1958 (age 68)
- Position: Midfielder

Senior career*
Years	Team	Apps	(Gls)
1979–1988	Al Mokawloon		

International career
1983–?	Egypt	4	

Managerial career
- 1999–2001: Al Mokawloon
- 2004–2005: Egypt U20
- 2005–2006: Al Mokawloon
- 2008–2009: Al Mokawloon
- 2009–2010: Ghazl El Mahalla
- 2011: Al Mokawloon (youth)
- 2012–2012: Al Mokawloon
- 2013–2014: Al Mokawloon
- * Club domestic league appearances and goals

Mohamed Radwan (Arabic: مُحَمَّد رِضْوَان; born 25 March 1958) is an Egyptian football manager and former player who played as a midfielder.
