= Islam Tarek =

Egyptian footballer (born 1988)

Personal information
- Date of birth: December 2, 1988 (age 37)
- Position: Goalkeeper

Team information
- Current team: El Gouna FC
- Number: 16

Senior career*
Years	Team	Apps	(Gls)
–2012	Al Nasr		
2012–2014	El Gouna		
2014–2016	Raja		
2016–	Tanta	35	(0)
- * Club domestic league appearances and goals as of 14 October 2017

Islam Tarek (Arabic: إسلام طارق; born December 2, 1988) is an Egyptian professional footballer who plays as a goalkeeper for Tanta.
