= Karim Munch =

Egyptian footballer (born 1989)

Personal information
- Date of birth: February 15, 1989 (age 37)
- Position: Attacking midfielder

Team information
- Current team: El Raja SC

Senior career*
Years	Team	Apps	(Gls)
–2014	Asyut Petroleum		
2014–2015	Alassiouty Sport		
2015–2016	Al Ittihad Alexandria Club		
2016–2017	Aswan FC		
2017–	El Raja SC		
- * Club domestic league appearances and goals as of 30 August 2017

Karim Munch (Arabic: كريم مانش; born February 15, 1989) is an Egyptian professional footballer who currently plays as an attacking midfielder for the Egyptian club El Raja SC.
