= Ayman El Mizzayn =

Egyptian footballer and manager (born 1971)

Personal information
- Full name: Ayman El Mizzayn
- Date of birth: 4 September 1971 (age 55)
- Place of birth: Alexandria, Egypt

Managerial career
- Years: Team
- 2011–2014: El Raja SC
- 2015–2015: Al Hammam SC
- 2015–2016: El Sharkia SC
- 2016–2017: Alassiouty SC
- 2017–2017: FC Masr
- 2017–2018: Pharco FC
- 2018–2018: Baladeyet El Mahalla SC
- 2018–2020: Tanta SC
- 2020–2020: Tanta SC

Ayman El Mizzayn (Arabic: ايمن المزين) is an Egyptian football manager. In 2020 he was appointed as head coach of Tanta SC.

== Managerial statistics ==
As of match played 15 September 2020

Managerial record by team and tenure
Team	From	To	Record					Ref.
Team	From	To	P	W	D	L	Win %	Ref.
El Raja SC	1 July 2011	10 January 2014	32	14	11	7	43.8	
Al Hammam SC	16 June 2015	25 October 2015	0	0	0	0	—	
El Sharkia SC	15 November 2015	28 July 2016	20	16	4	0	80.0	
Alassiouty SC	4 August 2016	5 May 2017	35	26	7	2	74.3	
FC Masr	1 July 2017	18 December 2017	17	7	6	4	41.2	
Pharco FC	22 December 2017	29 April 2018	17	6	7	4	35.3	
Baladeyet El Mahalla SC	1 July 2018	22 September 2018	6	2	3	1	33.3	
Tanta SC	28 October 2018	12 August 2020	40	13	17	10	32.5	
Tanta SC	7 September 2020	15 September 2020	2	0	0	2	0.0	
Total			151	73	50	28	48.3	—
