= Pedro Barny =

Portuguese football manager and former player

Personal information
- Full name: Luís Pedro Barros Barny Monteiro
- Date of birth: 20 July 1966 (age 60)
- Place of birth: Porto, Portugal
- Height: 1.80 m (5 ft 11 in)
- Position: Centre back

Youth career
- Estrelas Desportivas
- 1980–1985: Boavista

Senior career*
Years	Team	Apps	(Gls)
1985–1988	Boavista	49	(0)
1988–1990	Estrela Amadora	65	(0)
1990–1992	Boavista	69	(4)
1992–1993	Sporting CP	30	(0)
1993–1995	Boavista	62	(0)
1995–1998	Belenenses	57	(4)
1998–1999	Aves	15	(0)
Total		347	(8)

International career
1986–1987	Portugal U21	7	(0)

Managerial career
- 2001–2002: Académica (assistant)
- 2002–2004: Estrela Amadora (assistant)
- 2004–2007: Boavista (assistant)
- 2005–2005: Boavista
- 2006–2006: Boavista (Caretaker)
- 2008–2009: Espinho
- 2010–2010: Angola (assistant)
- 2010–2011: Al-Ittihad (assistant)
- 2011–2012: Al-Ahly (assistant)
- 2012–2012: Persepolis (assistant)
- 2018–2018: Ismaily
- 2019–2020: El Gouna
- * Club domestic league appearances and goals

Luís Pedro Barros Barny Monteiro (born 20 July 1966), known as Barny, is a Portuguese retired footballer who played as a central defender, and the manager of Egyptian club El Gouna FC.

== Playing career ==
Born in Porto, Barny played 332 Primeira Liga games over the course of 13 seasons, representing mainly hometown's Boavista FC. After three years of intermittent use as a youngster and a two-year spell with C.F. Estrela da Amadora, he returned to his main club, helping it to three top-four finishes during his spell there – in between, he spent the 1992–93 campaign with Sporting CP, being first-choice.

Barny retired in June 1999 at the age of 33, after three top-flight seasons with C.F. Os Belenenses and one with C.D. Aves, in his first and only second division experience. He won two Portuguese Cups from 1990 to 1992, with Estrela and Boavista.

== Coaching career ==
Barny started coaching two years after retiring. In 2004 he rejoined Boavista as an assistant, acting as interim in the 2004–05 and 2006–07 seasons for a total of four matches (one draw and three losses).

From February 2008 to June 2009, Barny was in charge of S.C. Espinho of the third level. He then resumed his assistant career in several teams and countries, mostly under compatriot Manuel José.

Subsequently, Barny worked in the Egyptian Premier League. He led Ismaily SC to a second-place finish and the semi-finals of the Egypt Cup in his first year, and was appointed at El Gouna FC late into 2019.

== Managerial statistics ==
As of match played 14 September 2020

Managerial record by team and tenure
Team	From	To	Record					Ref.
Team	From	To	P	W	D	L	Win %	Ref.
Boavista F.C.	30 April 2005	30 June 2005	3	0	1	2	0.0	
Boavista F.C. (Caretaker)	16 August 2006	27 August 2006	1	0	0	1	0.0	
S.C. Espinho	12 February 2008	30 June 2009	14	7	2	5	50.0	
Ismaily SC	31 January 2018	30 June 2018	15	8	5	2	53.3	
El Gouna FC	27 December 2019	14 September 2020	19	4	7	8	21.1	
Total			52	19	15	18	36.5	—

== Honours ==
=== Player ===
Estrela Amadora

- Taça de Portugal: 1989–90

Boavista

- Taça de Portugal: 1991–92
