= Mohamed Abdel-Samiea =

Egyptian football manager

Personal information
- Date of birth: 30 January 1955 (age 71)

Managerial career
- Years: Team
- 2002–2003: Banha
- 2004–2005: El Gouna
- 2012–2013: Al Mokawloon
- 2013–2014: El Gouna (assistant)
- 2014: El Gouna (youth)
- 2014: El Raja
- 2015–2016: Beni Suef
- 2016–2017: Dhofar (director)
- 2017–2020: Asyut Petroleum

Mohamed Abdel-Samiea (Arabic: مُحَمَّد عَبْد السَّمِيع; born 30 January 1955) is an Egyptian football manager.
