= Mahmoud Ateya =

Egyptian footballer (born 1984)

Personal information
- Date of birth: August 20, 1984 (age 42)
- Position: Goalkeeper

Team information
- Current team: El Raja SC
- Number: 1

Youth career
- Ismaily SC

Senior career*
| Years | Team | Apps | (Gls) |
| –2009 | Ittihad El Shorta | 1 | (0) |
| 2009–2012 | El Dakhleya SC | 8 | (0) |
| 2012–2013 | El-Entag El-Harby SC | 4 | (0) |
| 2013–2014 | Telephonat Beni Suef SC | 0 | (0) |
| 2017– | El Raja SC | | |
- * Club domestic league appearances and goals as of 14 August 2017

Mahmoud Ateya (Arabic: محمود عطية; born August 20, 1984) is an Egyptian professional footballer who currently plays as a goalkeeper for the Egyptian club El Raja SC.
