= Mohamed Hassan (footballer, born 1985) =

Egyptian footballer

Personal information
- Date of birth: March 28, 1985 (age 41)
- Position: Centre-forward

Team information
- Current team: Al Nasr

Youth career
- Ismaily

Senior career*
Years	Team	Apps	(Gls)
–2009	Tersana		
2009–2014	Al Nasr		
2014–2015	Ittihad El Shorta		
2015	El Mokawloon SC		
2015–	Al Nasr SC		
- * Club domestic league appearances and goals as of 6 September 2017

Mohamed Hassan (Arabic: مُحَمَّد حَسَن; born March 28, 1985), also known as "Mido" (Arabic: ميدو), is an Egyptian professional footballer who plays as a centre-forward for Ismaily SC. Hassan has scored more than 100 goals in Egyptian Second Division.
