= Bassam Abou Hadid =

Egyptian footballer (born 1988)

Personal information
- Date of birth: January 16, 1988 (age 38)
- Position: Attacking midfielder

Team information
- Current team: Ceramica Cleopatra FC

Senior career*
Years	Team	Apps	(Gls)
–2014	Enppi		
2014	El-Entag El-Harby		
2014–	El Raja SC		
- * Club domestic league appearances and goals as of 31 August 2017

Bassam Abou Hadid (Arabic: بسام أبو حديد; born January 16, 1988) is an Egyptian professional footballer who currently plays as an attacking midfielder for the Egyptian club Ceramica Cleopatra FC. Abouhadid previously played for Ennpi, El-Entag El-Harby, El Raja SC, Al Hammam SC, and Ceramica Cleopatra FC.
