= Alaa Nabil =

Egyptian footballer and manager (born 1962)

Alaa Nabiel
Personal information
- Full name: Alaa Aldeen Nabiel Morsi Ahmed
- Date of birth: 27 January 1962 (age 64)
- Place of birth: Egypt
- Position: Forward

Youth career
- Al Mokawloon Al Arab

Senior career*
Years	Team	Apps	(Gls)
1980–1991	Al Mokawloon Al Arab		

International career
1984–1986	Egypt	4	(1)

Managerial career
- 2004–2011: Egypt (asst.)
- 2007–2008: El Mokawloon
- 2011–2013: El Minya
- 2013–2014: Egypt (asst.)
- * Club domestic league appearances and goals

Alaa Aldeen Nabiel Morsi Ahmed (Arabic: عَلَاء الدِّين نَبِيل مُرْسِيّ أَحْمَد; born 27 January 1962) is an Egyptian former footballer. He represented Egypt in the 1984 Summer Olympics.
