= Fathallah barracks =

Early headquarters of the Hezbollah organisation prior to 1987

The Fathallah barracks were the early headquarters of the Hezbollah organisation, situated in the Basta neighbourhood of West Beirut.

== History ==
On 22 February 1987, following the defeat of the Amal Militia by a combination of Druze and Communist street fighters, 7,000 Syrian commandos moved into West Beirut for the first time since 1982. On 24 February the Basta HQ was taken over by the Syrians after an incident in which a Syrian soldier was wounded in the leg. At least 20 young Hizbollah supporters were taken prisoner and executed. Other sources put the number of victims as twenty seven, twenty three men and four women. Fifty thousand people attended their funeral. The killings put intense strain on the relationship between Iran and Syria and under pressure from Tehran the Syrian army stopped further activity in Beirut's Southern suburbs with its population of 800,000 Shiites. Hezbollah's headquarters were later moved to secret locations in Dahieh, a suburb of Beirut.
