= Mohamed Mamdouh (footballer) =

Egyptian footballer (born 1993)

Mohamed Mamdouh Kimo
Personal information
- Date of birth: May 24, 1993 (age 33)
- Position: Right back

Team information
- Current team: El Raja SC
- Number: 12

Senior career*
Years	Team	Apps	(Gls)
–2013	Ismaily SC		
2013–2014	El Sharkia Dokhan		
2014–2016	El Gouna FC		
2016–	El Raja SC		
- * Club domestic league appearances and goals as of 20 August 2017

Mohamed Mamdouh (Arabic: محمد ممدوح; born May 24, 1993) is an Egyptian professional footballer who currently plays as a right back for the Egyptian club El Raja SC. In 2014, he signed a 3-year contract for El Gouna FC from El Sharkia Dokhan in a 220,000 Egyptian pound transfer.
