= Mahmoud El Maghriby =

Egyptian footballer (born 1987)

Personal information
- Date of birth: May 16, 1987 (age 39)
- Position: Left winger

Team information
- Current team: El Raja SC
- Number: 22

Senior career*
Years	Team	Apps	(Gls)
- El Raja SC
- * Club domestic league appearances and goals as of 2 September 2017

Mahmoud El Maghriby (Arabic: مَحْمُود الْمَغْرِبِيّ; born May 16, 1987) is an Egyptian professional footballer who currently plays as a left winger for the Egyptian club El Raja SC. In 2017, he renewed his contract with Raja for 3 years.
