= El Raja SC =

Association football club in Mersa Matruh, Egypt

- Full name: El Raja Sporting Club نادي الرجاء الرياضي
- Short name: RAJ
- Founded: 1999; 27 years ago
- Ground: MS Matruh Stadium
- Chairman: Saad Abou Sondouq
- Manager: Ramadan El Sayed
- League: Egyptian Third Division
- 2017–18: Egyptian Premier League, 16th (relegated)
Home colours	Away colours	Third colours

El Raja Sporting Club (Arabic: نادي الرجاء الرياضي), simply known as El Raja, is an Egyptian football and sports club based in Mersa Matruh, Egypt. The club currently plays in the Egyptian Third Division, the third-highest league in the Egyptian football league system.

== Current squad ==
Egyptian Football Association (EFA) rules are that a team may only have 3 foreign born players in the squad. Note: Flags indicate national team as defined under FIFA eligibility rules; some limited exceptions apply. Players may hold more than one non-FIFA nationality.

No.	Pos.	Nation	Player
1	GK	EGY	Ahmed Khair
2	DF	EGY	Youssef Mansour
3	DF	EGY	Saad Kamel
7	MF	EGY	Mohamed Abdullah
8	MF	EGY	Mahmoud Qurany
9	MF	EGY	Ahmed El Akily
12	GK	EGY	Mohamed El Mougi
15	DF	EGY	Mohamed Abo Asa
16	GK	EGY	Ibrahim Issa
17	DF	EGY	Islam Abdulghani
18	FW	EGY	Ahmed Atef Socrate
19	MF	EGY	Ibrahim El Shaieb
20	FW	EGY	Ehab El Masry

No.	Pos.	Nation	Player
21	DF	EGY	Bassem Eid
23	MF	EGY	Mahmoud Fathi
24	DF	EGY	Ali Hussien
26	MF	EGY	Mahmoud Samir
27	FW	EGY	Ahmed Haggag
28	MF	EGY	Mohamed Montaser
30	GK	EGY	Ahmed Farouk
31	FW	EGY	Hamada Naser
32	DF	EGY	Abdel Hamid Samy
33	MF	EGY	Islam El Foly
34	FW	EGY	Hamada El Ghanam
38	MF	EGY	Rizk Abdelhalim
66	MF	EGY	Mahmoud Abdelaatty

== notable players ==
(Burkina Faso)

- Omar Kaboré

(Cameroon)

- Dimitri Nguile

(Ivory Coast)

- Mansou Kouakou

(Egypt)

- Mahmoud Abdel Aati
- Bassam Abou Hadid
- Islam Abou Ouffa
- Islam Adel
- Emad Alaa
- Mahmoud Ateya
- Adel Belal
- Hany El Agazy
- Ali El-Araby
- Nader El Ashry
- Mohamed El Baaly
- Karim El Deeb
- Mostafa El Gamal
- Mahmoud El Maghriby
- Shawky El Said
- Mahmoud El Zonfouly
- Mahmoud Farag
- Wael Farrag
- Hesham Fathallah
- Mohamed Fathy
- Ahmed Felix
- Islam Gaber
- Islam Abdel Ghani
- Ahmed Gomaa

(Egypt)

- Ahmed Haggag
- Ibrahim Helal
- Mohamed Ibrahim
- Ramzy Khaled
- Mohamed Magdy
- Mohamed Mamdouh
- Milo
- Mohamed Mohsen
- Karim Munch
- Amr Nabil
- Ibrahim Rakha
- Hesham Ramadan
- Ahmed Sabri
- Mohamed Sadek
- Tarek Salem
- Tarek Salim
- Ahmed Samy
- Alaa Shaaban
- Islam Tarek
- Mohamed Tarek

(Ghana)

- Stephen Baffour
- Emmanuel Odoi

(Guinea-Bissau)

- Formose Mendy

(Liberia)

- Ballah Somah

(Mali)

- Nico Dao
- Mamadou Keita
- Mamadou Kouyate

(Nigeria)

- Emmanuel Adole
- Jabril Lawal

(Syria)

- Rabee Al Abdallah

(Tunisia)

- Ghazi Chellouf

== notable coaches ==
- Ayman El Mizzayn (2011–2014)
- Khaled Eid (2014)
- Mohamed Abdel-Samiea (2014)
- Samir Kamouna (2014–2016)
- Ahmed El Agouz (2017)
- Khaled El Kamash (2017)
