= Tarek Salem =

Egyptian footballer (born 1987)

Personal information
- Date of birth: July 26, 1987 (age 39)
- Position: Striker

Team information
- Current team: El Raja SC

Senior career*
Years	Team	Apps	(Gls)
–2015	El Raja SC		
2015–2016	Al Ittihad Alexandria		
2016–	El Raja SC		
- * Club domestic league appearances and goals as of 4 September 2017

Tarek Salem (Arabic: طَارِق سَالِم; born July 26, 1986) is an Egyptian professional footballer who plays as a striker for the Egyptian club El Raja SC. In 2016, he moved from Al-Ittihad to El Raja SC in a E£900,000 transfer.
