= Landers, Frary & Clark =

American housewares company

- Industry: Household appliances
- Founded: 1842
- Founder: George M. Landers
- Defunct: 1965
- Headquarters: New Britain, Connecticut, US

Landers, Frary & Clark was a housewares company based in New Britain, Connecticut. The firm traced its origins to 1842, when George M. Landers and Josiah Dewey entered into a partnership named Dewey and Landers, which manufactured various metal products. Eventually, the company was reorganized as Landers, Frary & Clark in 1862. The firm produced a variety of household products and appliances, including many electric appliances. Some of Landers, Frary & Clark's most successful products included the Universal Bread Maker, the Universal Food Chopper, and the Coffee Percolator. In 1965, the majority of the Landers, Frary & Clark was taken over by the J.B. Williams Company of New York, the food chopper division was acquired by the Union Manufacturing Company, and the electrical appliance operations was purchased by General Electric.

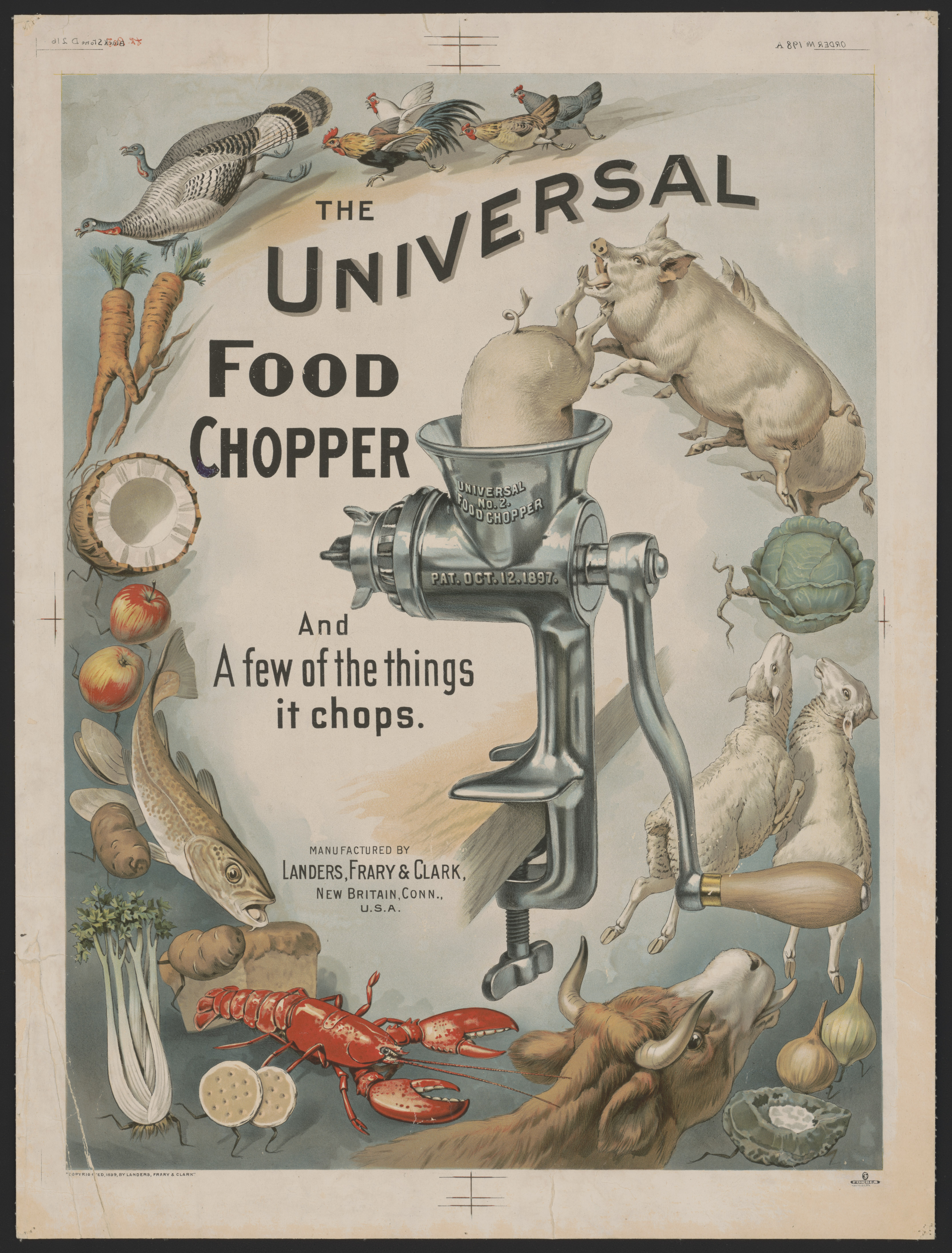
An advertisement for the Universal Food Chopper (1899)

The company manufactured a wide variety of products over the years, food scales, coffee grinders, cake mixers, bread makers, coffee pots, percolators, tableware, irons, toasters, coffee urns, vacuum cleaners, electric ranges, washing machines, blenders, electric mixers, electric heaters, dishwashers, and electric blankets. Landers, Frary & Clark also produced stainless steel bull-nose rings, vacuum bottles, window hardware, ice skates, mouse traps, can openers, corkscrews, straight razors, aluminum cookware, and thousands of other products. Many of the company's items were marketed under the brand Universal.

== History ==
In 1842, New Britain politician and businessman George M. Landers entered into a partnership with Josiah Dewey called Dewey and Landers. The partnership manufactured metal products such as furniture casters, window springs, coat and hat hooks, and other small hardware items, typically made out of brass. Following a change of partnership in either 1852 or 1853, Levi O. Smith joined the firm, and the business was reorganized as a stock company called Landers and Smith Manufacturing. In 1862, Landers and Smith purchased of Meriden-based business Frary & Carey, resulting in James D. Frary joining the firm, Levi O. Smith retiring, and Landers and Smith reorganizing as Landers, Frary & Clark. The firm expanded into cutlery manufacturing in 1866, when the firm inaugurated its Aetna Works manufacturing facility. The Aetna Works burnt down in a fire in 1874, but was rebuilt as a larger, more modern plant following the fire.

During the early 20th century, when many households in the United States were first accessing electricity, the company launched a line of electric appliances. These products were a commercial success, and resulted in the company offering more electric household goods.

In 1965, the majority of the Landers, Frary & Clark was taken over by the J.B. Williams Company of New York, the food chopper division was acquired by the Union Manufacturing Company, and the electrical appliance operations was purchased by General Electric. The J.B. Williams Company shut down Landers, Frary & Clark's production in New Britain, while General Electric kept production in New Britain for four years after the transaction. Landers, Frary & Clark's original manufacturing complex continues to be intact, and is occupied by a mix of small industrial and office uses, whereas the company's other two plants were demolished for highway construction during the 1960s.

== Products ==
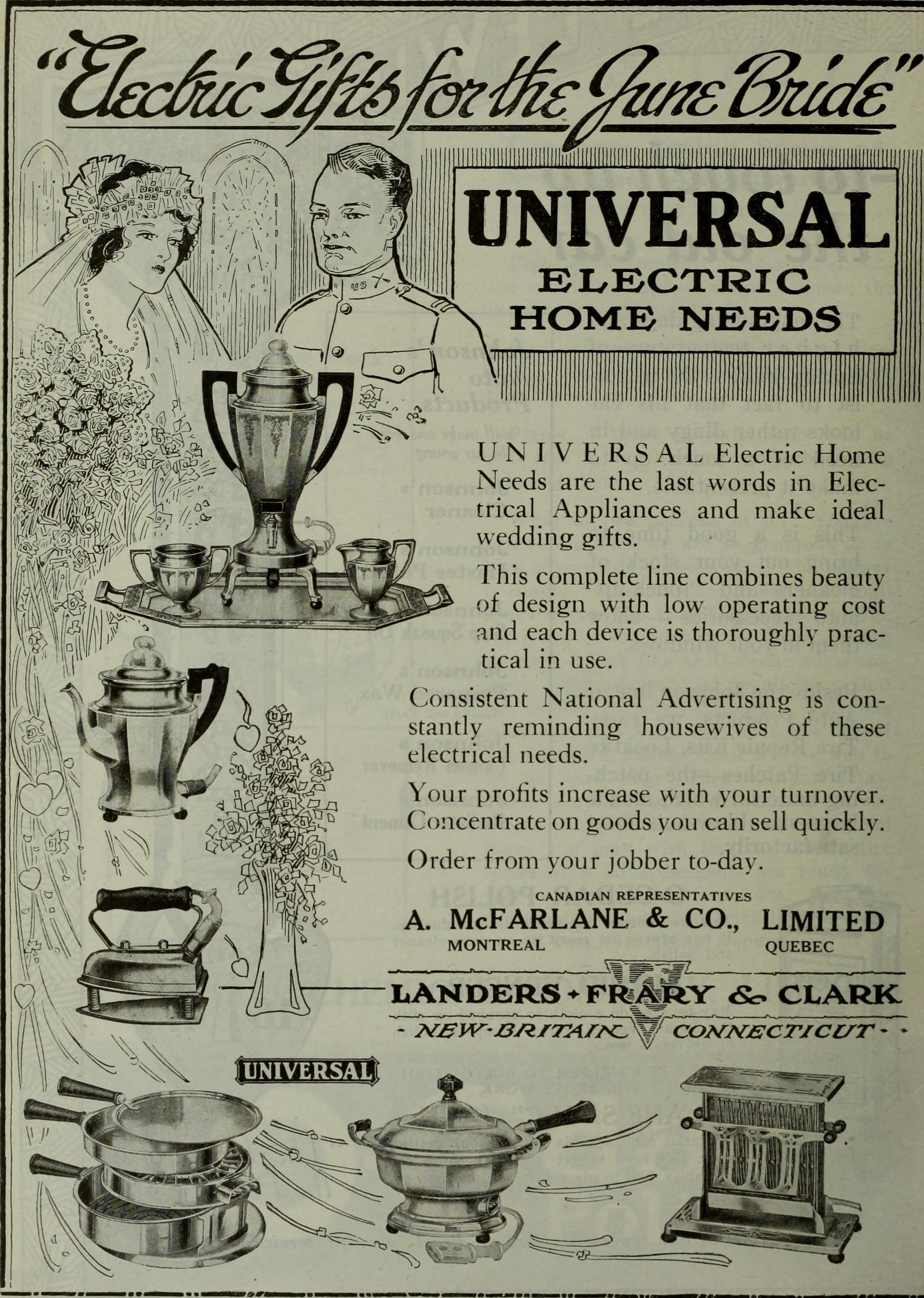
An advertisement for the company's "Universal" line of appliances (1919)

During the 19th century, Landers, Frary & Clark produced a number of household wares, such as food scales, coffee grinders, cake mixers, bread makers, coffee pots, and percolators along with tableware.

In 1898, Landers, Frary & Clark began producing the Universal Food Chopper.

Upon the advent of electrification in the United States in the early 20th century, then-president of the company Charles Smith launched an electric percolator, iron, toaster, and coffee urn. This new line of items succeeded, resulting in the firm launching more electric appliances, such as vacuum cleaners, electric ranges, washing machines, blenders, electric mixers, electric heaters, dishwashers, and electric blankets.

During the United States' involvement in World War I, the company temporarily produced equipment for the military of the United States. Landers, Frary & Clark produced approximately 3 million canteens, 5 million trench knives, millions of mess kits, bacon cans, canteen cups, and similar metalware, as well as practically all of the sabers required by the United States Cavalry.

Some of the non-electric kitchenware assets were acquired from G.E. in 1984 by Universal Housewares, Inc./Universal Trading, Inc., who still market "Universal" meat grinders and coffee mills.
