= List of supermarket chains in Egypt =

This is a list of supermarket chains in Egypt.

== Private sector stores ==
- Abdullah AlOthaim Markets
- ABA Market
- Alfa Supermarkets
- Awlad Ragab
- BIM
- Carrefour
- Fathalla Gomla Market
- Gourmet Egypt
- Hyper One
- Kazyon
- Kheir Zaman
- Lulu Hypermarket
- Metro Markets (different from Metro Cash & Carry)
- Panda
- Seoudi
- Spinneys
- Zahran
- Migros

== Public sector stores ==
- Asmak 2000 market
- Family market
- New market
- Delta market
- Masria market
- Alex market
- Aman stores (owned to Egyptian Police)
- National service projects organization stores (owned to Egyptian Armed Forces )
- public service organization stores (owned to Egyptian Armed Forces )
- Future of egypt organization (owned to Egyptian Air Force )
- Omar Effendi

== See also ==
- List of supermarket chains in Africa
- List of supermarket chains
