= Tanta SC =

Association football club in Tanta, Egypt

- Full name: Tanta Football Club
- Nickname: Sons of El Badawi
- Founded: 5 June 1928; 98 years ago
- Ground: Tanta Club Stadium
- Capacity: 8,000
- League: Egyptian Second Division A
- 2025–26: Egyptian Second Division A, 16th of 18
Home colours	Away colours

Tanta Sports Club (Arabic: نادى طنطا الرياضى) is an Egyptian football and sports club based in Tanta, Egypt. The club was established on 5 June 1928 and is one of the oldest football clubs in Africa. The club currently plays in the Egyptian Second Division A having last played in the Egyptian Premier League in the 2019–2020 season.

== Current squad ==
Note: Flags indicate national team as defined under FIFA eligibility rules; some limited exceptions apply. Players may hold more than one non-FIFA nationality.

No.	Pos.	Nation	Player
1	GK	EGY	Islam Tarek
3	DF	EGY	Mahmoud Shaker
4	DF	EGY	Mohamed El Ashry
5	DF	EGY	Mahmoud Masoud
10	FW	EGY	Mohamed Khafaga
14	DF	EGY	Mahmoud Ghaly
16	GK	EGY	Mohamed Sherif

No.	Pos.	Nation	Player
24	DF	EGY	Hany Adel
25	DF	EGY	Soliman Abd Rabo

== Current technical staff ==
Position	Name	Nationality
Manager:	Reda Abdel Aal	(Egypt)
Assistant manager:	Ahmed Hamouda	(Egypt)
Assistant manager:	Waleed El Mahrouki	(Egypt)
Goalkeeping coach:	Walid Ibrahim	(Egypt)

Updated to match played 7 September 2020

== Managerial history ==
- (Egypt) Ayman El Mizzayn (2018–2020)
- (Egypt) Mohamed Salah (2020–2020)
- (Egypt) Ahmed Samy (2020–2020)
- (Egypt) Ayman El Mizzayn (2020–2020)
- (Egypt) Reda Abdel Aal (2020–present)
