= Al Mokawloon Al Arab SC =

Association football club in Cairo, Egypt

Al Mokawloon Al Arab
- Full name: Al Mokawloon Al Arab Sporting Club
- Nickname: Mountain Wolves
- Founded: 1973; 53 years ago
- Ground: Osman Ahmed Osman Stadium
- Capacity: 35,000
- Owner: Arab Contractors
- Chairman: Mohsen Salah
- League: Egyptian Premier League
- 2024–25: Egyptian Second Division A, 1st of 20 (Promoted)
- Website: arabcontclub.com

Al Mokawloon Al Arab Sporting Club (Arabic: نادي المقاولون العرب الرياضي, romanized: Nādī l-Muqāwilūn al-ʿArab ar-Riyāḍī), known locally as Al Mokawloon, is an Egyptian professional sports club based in Nasr City and owned by Arab Contractors (Al Mokawloon Al Arab). The club is best known for their football team, which currently plays in the Egyptian Premier League.

The club over the years have produced some of the most famous and talented players in Egypt, including Abdel Sattar Sabry, Mohamed Salah, and Mohamed Elneny.

== History ==
=== Arab Contractors ===
The club was founded in 1973 by the Egyptian engineer, contractor, entrepreneur, and politician Osman Ahmed Osman as the official sporting club for his prominent, regional construction company, the Arab Contractors, arguably the biggest one in the entire Middle East at that time.

The 1983 championship club included Joseph-Antoine Bell (Cameroon), Karim Abdul Razak (Ghana) and Ishmael Dyfan (Sierra Leone).

== Honours and achievements ==
=== Domestic ===
- Egyptian Premier League
  - Winners (1): 1982–83
- Egypt Cup
  - Winners (3): 1989–90, 1994–95, 2003–04
- Egyptian Super Cup
  - Winners (1): 2004

=== Continental ===
- African Cup Winners' Cup (Note: First Egyptian Team to win this Championship.)
  - Winners (3): 1982, 1983, 1996
- CAF Super Cup
  - Runners-up (1): 1997

== Performance in CAF competitions ==
- FR = First round
- SR = Second round
- PO = Play-off round
- QF = Quarter-final
- SF = Semi-final

Season	Competition	Round	Country	Club	Home	Away	Aggregate
1982	African Cup Winners' Cup	FR	Sudan	Hay Al Arab	3–1	1–1	4–2
1982	African Cup Winners' Cup	SR	Mozambique	Desportivo Maputo	3–2	2–0	5–2
1982	African Cup Winners' Cup	QF	Ivory Coast	Africa Sports	3–0	0–2	3–2
1982	African Cup Winners' Cup	SF	Ghana	Hearts of Oak	1–1	2–1	3–2
1982	African Cup Winners' Cup	Final	Zambia	Power Dynamos	2–0	2–0	4–0
1983	African Cup Winners' Cup	FR	Burundi	Vital'O	6–1	0–0	6–1
1983	African Cup Winners' Cup	SR	Uganda	KCCA	2–2	2–2	4–4 (3–1 p)
1983	African Cup Winners' Cup	QF	Zimbabwe	CAPS United	2–0	1–2	3–2
1983	African Cup Winners' Cup	SF	Guinea	Horoya	3–0	1–0	4–0
1983	African Cup Winners' Cup	Final	Togo	OC Agaza	0–0	1–0	1–0
1984	African Cup Winners' Cup	FR	Somalia	Horseed	7–0	0–2	7–2
1984	African Cup Winners' Cup	SR	Sudan	Al Merrikh	2–0	0–0	2–0
1984	African Cup Winners' Cup	QF	Uganda	SC Villa	1–0	1–2	2–2 (a)
1984	African Cup Winners' Cup	SF	Egypt	Al Ahly	1–1	0–0	1–1 (a)
1991	African Cup Winners' Cup	FR	Chad	Renaissance	3–0	1–0	4–0
1991	African Cup Winners' Cup	SR	Uganda	KCCA	2–0	0–1	2–1
1991	African Cup Winners' Cup	QF	Burundi	AS Inter Star	0–0	0–0	0–0 (4–5 p)
1996	African Cup Winners' Cup	FR	Rwanda	Rayon Sports	2–1	0–0	2–1
1996	African Cup Winners' Cup	SR	Tanzania	Simba	2–0	1–3	3–3 (a)
1996	African Cup Winners' Cup	QF	Morocco	FUS Rabat	1–0	0–0	1–0
1996	African Cup Winners' Cup	SF	Cameroon	Canon Yaoundé	2–1	1–1	3–2
1996	African Cup Winners' Cup	Final	Zaire	AC Sodigraf	4–0	0–0	4–0
1997	CAF Super Cup	Final	Egypt	Zamalek	0–0 (2–4 p)		
1997	African Cup Winners' Cup	FR	Kenya	Mumias Sugar	2–0	0–0	2–0
1997	African Cup Winners' Cup	SR	Zambia	Nchanga Rangers	3–0	1–2	4–2
1997	African Cup Winners' Cup	QF	Tunisia	Étoile du Sahel	2–2	0–2	2–4
2005	CAF Confederation Cup	FR	Ethiopia	Banks	3–1	0–0	3–1
2005	CAF Confederation Cup	SR	Sudan	Al Merrikh	3–0	1–3	4–3
2005	CAF Confederation Cup	PO	Ivory Coast	Africa Sports	3–0	0–0	3–0
2005	CAF Confederation Cup	Group B	Gabon	FC 105 Libreville	2–1	0–1	3rd
2005	CAF Confederation Cup	Group B	Egypt	Ismaily	2–3	1–0	3rd
2005	CAF Confederation Cup	Group B	Nigeria	Dolphins	0–1	1–2	3rd
2020–21	CAF Confederation Cup	PR	Djibouti	Arta/Solar7	9–1	1–0	10–1
2020–21	CAF Confederation Cup	FR	Tunisia	Étoile du Sahel	0–0	1–2	1–2

== Performance in domestic competitions ==
Egyptian Clubs Competitions
Year	League	Position	Egypt Cup	Super Cup
2000–01	Premier League	8	Quarter-finals	
2001–02	Premier League	5	Quarter-finals	Runner-up
2002–03	Premier League	12	Round of 16	
2003–04	Second Division		Winner	Winner
2004–05	Second Division	1	Round of 16	
2005–06	Premier League	9	Round of 16	
2006–07	Premier League	8	Round of 16	
2007–08	Premier League	12	Semi-finals	
2008–09	Premier League	10	Round of 16	
2009–10	Premier League	11	Quarter-finals	
2010–11	Premier League	16	Semi-finals	
2011–12	Premier League	not finished	not held	
2012–13	Premier League	not finished	–	
2013–14	Premier League	4 (Group 1)	Round of 32	
2014–15	Premier League	7	Round of 16	
2015–16	Premier League	13	Round of 32	
2016–17	Premier League	9	Round of 32	
2017–18	Premier League	10	Quarter-finals	
2018–19	Premier League	5	Round of 16	
2019–20	Premier League	4	Quarter-finals	

== Current squad ==
As of 4 February 2023

Note: Flags indicate national team as defined under FIFA eligibility rules; some limited exceptions apply. Players may hold more than one non-FIFA nationality.

No.	Pos.	Nation	Player
1	GK	EGY	Mahmoud Abou El Saoud
2	DF	EGY	Amir Abed
3	MF	EGY	Youssef El Gohary
4	MF	EGY	Ahmed El Shimi
7	FW	MTN	Mamadou Niass
8	MF	EGY	Mohamed Rizk
9	FW	EGY	Mohamed Salem
10	MF	EGY	Omar Saviola
11	DF	EGY	Louay Wael
12	MF	EGY	Ahmed Afifi
14	FW	EGY	Gebna
16	GK	EGY	Hassan Mahmoud Shahin
17	FW	EGY	Fady Farid
18	GK	EGY	Ahmed El Arabi

No.	Pos.	Nation	Player
19	MF	EGY	Mohamed Magli
20	DF	EGY	Ahmed Alaa
21	DF	BFA	Farouck Kabore
22	DF	EGY	Mohamed Gharib
23	DF	UGA	Joseph Ochaya
24	FW	COL	Luis Hinestroza
26	DF	EGY	Ahmed Eid
27	MF	EGY	Ammar Hamdy
28	FW	NGR	John Okoli
29	FW	PLE	Mahmoud Wadi (on loan from Pyramids)
32	DF	EGY	Mohamed Hozian
35	MF	EGY	Ahmed Fawzi
70	FW	EGY	Ahmed Atef
74	DF	EGY	Mostafa Mokhtar

=== Out on loan ===
Note: Flags indicate national team as defined under FIFA eligibility rules; some limited exceptions apply. Players may hold more than one non-FIFA nationality.

No. / Pos. / Nation / Player	No. / Pos. / Nation / Player

== Managers ==
- (Germany) Michael Krüger (Jan 1, 1996 – July 1, 1997)
- (Austria) Josef Hickersberger (July 1, 1997 – June 30, 1999)
- (Egypt) Hassan Shehata (2004–05)
- (Egypt) Ghanem Sultan (2005)
- (Egypt) Mohamed Radwan (2005–06)
- (Egypt) Taha Basry (July 1, 2006 – June 30, 2007)
- (Egypt) Alaa Nabiel (2007–08)
- (Egypt) Mohamed Radwan (May 1, 2008 – May 23, 2009)
- (Egypt) Mohamed Amer (May 23, 2009 – Aug 13, 2010)
- (Egypt) Hamza El Gamal (Aug 13, 2010 – Nov 8, 2010)
- (Serbia) Ivica Todorov (Nov 9, 2010 – April 15, 2011)
- (Egypt) Mohamed Radwan (April 18, 2011 – Jan 20, 2012)
- (Egypt) Talaat Youssef (Jan 2012–1?)
- (Egypt) Mohamed Abdel-Samiea (201?–March 8, 2013)
- (Egypt) Hamdi Nouh (March 8, 2013 – March 17, 2013)
- (Egypt) Mohamed Radwan (March 17, 2013–?)
- (Egypt) Hassan Shehata (2014–15)
- (Egypt) Tarek El-Ashry (2015–16)
- (Egypt) Emad El Nahhas (2018–)
