= 2022–23 Ceramica Cleopatra FC season =

Ceramica Cleopatra FC
2022–23 season
- Manager: Ahmed Samy (until 24 January); Moïn Chaâbani (from 26 January until 21 May); Helmy Toulan (from 21 May)
- Stadium: Cairo International Stadium
- Egyptian Premier League: 13th
- Egypt Cup: Round of 16
- EFA Cup: Winners

The 2022–23 Ceramica Cleopatra FC season was the club's 16th season in existence and the second consecutive season in the top flight of Egyptian football. In addition to the domestic league, Ceramica Cleopatra participated in this season's editions of the Egypt Cup and the EFA Cup.

== Players ==
=== First-team squad ===
As of 12 December 2022

No.	Pos.	Nation	Player
1	GK	EGY	Mohamed Bassam
2	DF	EGY	Ahmed Hany
3	DF	EGY	Mohamed Shokry
4	DF	EGY	Mahmoud El Badry
5	DF	EGY	Ragab Nabil
6	DF	PLE	Musab Al-Battat
7	FW	EGY	Ragab Khaled Omran
8	MF	EGY	Mahmoud Bolbol
9	FW	EGY	Ahmed Yasser Rayyan
10	MF	EGY	Sherif Dabo
11	DF	EGY	Mohamed Nasef
14	MF	EGY	Mohamed Tony
15	MF	EGY	Zalaka
16	GK	EGY	Amer Mohamed (captain)
17	DF	EGY	Ahmed Ramadan
18	FW	NGR	John Okoye Ebuka

No.	Pos.	Nation	Player
19	MF	EGY	Canaria
20	MF	EGY	Mohamed Ibrahim (Vice-captain)
21	MF	EGY	Mohamed Adel
22	DF	EGY	Abdel Rahman Ramadan
25	MF	EGY	Ahmed El Armouty
26	MF	GHA	Justice Arthur
27	MF	EGY	Mido Gaber
28	DF	TUN	Seif Teka
29	FW	EGY	Salah Mohsen (on loan from Al Ahly SC)
30	MF	EGY	Amr Kalawa
35	FW	EGY	Hamza Magdi
39	MF	EGY	Abdelrahman El Sakran
40	FW	NGR	Samuel Amadi
77	GK	EGY	Ali El Gabry

== Transfers ==
=== In ===
No.	Pos	Player	Transferred from	Fee	Date	Source
21	MF	(Egypt) Mohamed Adel	(Egypt) Ismaily		19 September 2022	
29	MF	(Egypt) Salah Mohsen	(Egypt) Al Ahly	Loan	10 October 2022	

=== Out ===
No.	Pos	Player	Transferred to	Fee	Date	Source
	FW	(Egypt) Basem Morsy	(Egypt) Ismaily	Free	14 September 2022	
	MF	(Egypt) Saleh Gomaa	(Egypt) Ismaily	Free	15 September 2022	
	DF	(Egypt) Ahmed Mohsen	(Egypt) Ismaily		19 September 2022	
18	FW	(Nigeria) John Okoye Ebuka	(Libya) Al Ahli Tripoli	Loan	21 January 2023	

== Pre-season and friendlies ==
Win Draw Loss Fixtures

16 November 2022 Friendly	Pyramids (Egypt)	1–0	(Egypt) Ceramica Cleopatra	Cairo
	Magdy	Report		Stadium: 30 June Stadium

21 November 2022 Friendly	Tala'ea El Gaish (Egypt)	0–0	(Egypt) Ceramica Cleopatra	Cairo
		Report		Stadium: Gehaz El Reyada Stadium

6 February 2023 Friendly	Ceramica Cleopatra (Egypt)	0–0	(Sudan) Al-Merrikh	Cairo
		Report		Stadium: 30 June Stadium

22 March 2023 Friendly	Ceramica Cleopatra (Egypt)	2–1	(Egypt) Aswan	Cairo
	Wayou 15'; Shikodi 40'	Report	Kamone 50'	Stadium: Air Defense Stadium subfield

== Competitions ==
=== Overview ===
Competition	First match	Last match	Starting round	Final position	Record							
Competition	First match	Last match	Starting round	Final position	Pld	W	D	L	GF	GA	GD	Win %
Egyptian Premier League	18 October 2022	14 July 2023	Matchday 1	13th	34	7	16	11	31	32	−1	20.59
Egypt Cup	7 May 2023	22 June 2023	Round of 32	Round of 16	2	1	0	1	5	1	+4	50.00
EFA Cup	21 March 2023	22 July 2023	Round of 16	Winners	4	1	3	0	7	4	+3	25.00
Total					40	9	19	12	43	37	+6	22.50

Source: Soccerway

=== Egyptian Premier League ===
==== League table ====
Pos	Team	Pld	W	D	L	GF	GA	GD	Pts
11	Ismaily	34	9	13	12	35	38	−3	40
12	National Bank of Egypt	34	9	12	13	35	40	−5	39
13	Ceramica Cleopatra	34	7	16	11	31	32	−1	37
14	Tala'ea El Gaish	34	8	12	14	33	45	−12	36
15	El Dakhleya	34	7	14	13	32	43	−11	35

Source: Soccerway
Rules for classification: 1) Points; 2) Head-to-head points; 3) Head-to-head goal difference; 4) Goal difference; 5) Goals scored; 6) Play-off.

==== Results summary ====
Overall								Home						Away					
Pld	W	D	L	GF	GA	GD	Pts	W	D	L	GF	GA	GD	W	D	L	GF	GA	GD
34	7	16	11	31	32	−1	37	5	8	4	16	15	+1	2	8	7	15	17	−2

Last updated: 10 July 2023.
Source: worldfootball

==== Results by round ====
Round	1	2	3	4	5	6	7	8	9	10	11	12	13	14	15	16	17	18	19	20	21	22	23	24	25	26	27	28	29	30	31	32	33	34
Ground	A	H	A	H	A	H	H	H	A	H	A	H	A	H	H	A	H	H	A	H	A	H	A	A	A	H	A	H	A	H	A	A	H	A
Result	W	L	L	W	L	D	W	D	L	D	W	L	D	L	D	D	L	W	L	W	D	D	D	D	D	D	L	D	L	D	D	D	W	L
Position	1	8	11	8	10	8	7	7	8	7	7	10	10	10	10	11	12	10	11	10	11	11	11	12	11	11	12	11	12	13	12	12	11	13

Source: worldfootball
A = Away; H = Home; W = Win; D = Draw; L = Loss

==== Matches ====
The league fixtures were announced on 9 October 2022.

18 October 2022 1	Al Masry	0–3	Ceramica Cleopatra	Borg El Arab
19:00 EST (UTC+2)		Report	Gaber 15'; Ebuka 30'; Rayyan 59'	Stadium: Borg El Arab Stadium; Referee: Sayed Munir

23 October 2022 2	Ceramica Cleopatra	0–2	Zamalek	Suez
17:00 EST (UTC+2)	Hany (yellow card) 36'	Report	Jaziri 10'; El Wardi (yellow card) 41'; Awad (yellow card) 81'; Fatouh 87'; Obama (yellow card) 88'; Zizo (yellow card) 90+4'	Stadium: Suez Stadium; Referee: Mohamed Maarouf

1 November 2022 3	National Bank	3–1	Ceramica Cleopatra	Cairo
19:00 EST (UTC+2)	Nabil 2' (o.g.); Bambo 26'; Cissé 56'	Report	Nabil 65'	Stadium: Cairo International Stadium; Referee: Hesham El Flal

2 December 2022 5	Al Mokawloon Al Arab	2–1	Ceramica Cleopatra	Cairo
14:45 EST (UTC+2)	Khaled 37'; Ochaya 84'	Report	Adel 66'	Stadium: Osman Ahmed Osman Stadium; Referee: Sobhy El Amrawi

8 December 2022 6	Ceramica Cleopatra	1–1	Ismaily	Suez
19:00 EST (UTC+2)	Nabil 40' (pen.)	Report	El Mohamady 69'	Stadium: Suez Stadium; Referee: Mahmoud El Banna

12 December 2022 4	Ceramica Cleopatra	2–1	Haras El Hodoud	Cairo
14:45 EST (UTC+2)	Rayan 16'; Kalawa 39'	Report	Ziko 90+5'	Stadium: Cairo International Stadium; Referee: Mohammad Sabahi

15 December 2022 7	Ceramica Cleopatra	3–2	Aswan	Cairo
14:45 EST (UTC+2)	Shokry 31'; Ebuka 72'; Teka 90+2'	Report	Mido 74'; Zaki 89'	Stadium: Cairo International Stadium; Referee: Walid Abdelrazek

19 December 2022 8	Ceramica Cleopatra	0–0	El Dakhleya	Cairo
14:45 EST (UTC+2)	Adel (yellow card) 45+1'; Nabil (yellow card) 45+4'	Report	Ahmed (yellow card) 45+4'; Chimezie (yellow card) 58'	Stadium: Cairo International Stadium; Referee: Mostafa El Shahdi

23 December 2022 9	Al Ittihad	1–0	Ceramica Cleopatra	Borg El Arab
17:00 EST (UTC+2)	Abdel Naby 2'; Salifu (yellow card) 7'	Report	Salah (yellow card) 84'	Stadium: Borg El Arab Stadium; Referee: Hesham El Kady

28 December 2022 10	Ceramica Cleopatra	1–1	Al Ahly	Cairo
19:00 EST (UTC+2)	Ramadan 45'; Bassam (yellow card) 72'; Shokry (yellow card) 78'; Ebuka (yellow card) 83'	Report	Hany (yellow card) 44'; Maâloul 78' (pen.)	Stadium: Cairo International Stadium; Referee: Ibrahim Nour El Din

3 January 2023 11	Ghazl El Mahalla	0–3	Ceramica Cleopatra	El Mahalla El Kubra
14:45 EST (UTC+2)	El Henawy (yellow card) 51'; Mkami (yellow card) 60'	Report	Ramadan (yellow card) 35'; Ibrahim 54' (pen.); Metwaly (yellow card) 80'; Rayan 90+2'; El Armouty 90+4'	Stadium: Ghazl El Mahalla Stadium; Referee: Abdelaziz El Sayed

7 January 2023 12	Ceramica Cleopatra	2–3	Future	Cairo
19:00 EST (UTC+2)	Gaber 1'; Rayan (yellow card) 5'; Ramadan (yellow card) 22'; Ebuka 45+2'; Ramadan (yellow card) 74'	Report	Ngwem 27'; Lasheen (yellow card) 37'; Reda 46'; Rizk (yellow card) 61'; Kamal 65'; Samir (yellow card) 74'; Mohsen (yellow card) 81'	Stadium: Cairo International Stadium; Referee: Tarek Magdy

13 January 2023 13	Pharco	1–1	Ceramica Cleopatra	Alexandria
17:00 EST (UTC+2)	Abdulaziz 29' (pen.)	Report	Rayan 54'	Stadium: Alexandria Stadium; Referee: Mohamed El Atabani

20 January 2023 14	Ceramica Cleopatra	0–2	Smouha	Cairo
19:00 EST (UTC+2)		Report	Essam 38'; Boateng 90'	Stadium: Cairo International Stadium; Referee: Ahmed Ghandour

23 January 2023 15	Ceramica Cleopatra	0–0	Tala'ea El Gaish	Cairo
19:00 EST (UTC+2)		Report	Shawky (yellow card) 48'	Stadium: Cairo International Stadium; Referee: Osama Ismail

29 January 2023 16	Pyramids	2–2	Ceramica Cleopatra	Cairo
19:00 EST (UTC+2)	Sobhi 18' (pen.); Samy (red card) 34'; Said 58'	Report	Ramadan (yellow card) 14'; Gaber (yellow card) 23'; Ibrahim 35' (pen.); Antar (yellow card) 80'; Mohsen 90', (yellow card) 90+10'	Stadium: 30 June Stadium; Referee: Sobhy El Amrawi

5 February 2023 17	Ceramica Cleopatra	0–1	ENPPI	Cairo
19:00 EST (UTC+2)		Report	Youssef 2'	Stadium: Cairo International Stadium; Referee: Sayed Munir

12 February 2023 18	Ceramica Cleopatra	3–0	Al Masry	Borg El Arab
18:00 EST (UTC+2)	Rayan 31', 49'; Kamal 75' (o.g.)	Report		Stadium: Borg El Arab Stadium; Referee: Mohamed Adel

28 February 2023 20	Ceramica Cleopatra	2–1	National Bank	Cairo
17:00 EST (UTC+2)	Kalawa 77'; Mohsen 90+6'	Report	Bambo 51'	Stadium: Osman Ahmed Osman Stadium; Referee: Walid Abdelrazek

5 March 2023 21	Haras El Hodoud	0–0	Ceramica Cleopatra	Alexandria
18:00 EST (UTC+2)		Report		Stadium: Haras El Hodoud Stadium; Referee: Amin Omar

30 March 2023 22	Ceramica Cleopatra	0–0	Al Mokawloon Al Arab	Cairo
21:15 EST (UTC+2)		Report		Stadium: Osman Ahmed Osman Stadium; Referee: Hesham El Kady

3 April 2023 23	Ismaily	1–1	Ceramica Cleopatra	Ismailia
21:15 EST (UTC+2)	El Shamy 7'	Report	Teka 76'	Stadium: Ismailia Stadium; Referee: Abdelaziz El Sayed

7 April 2023 24	Aswan	1–1	Ceramica Cleopatra	Aswan
21:15 EST (UTC+2)	Dilson 44'	Report	Rayan 23'	Stadium: Aswan Stadium; Referee: Mahmoud Bassiouni

12 April 2023 25	El Dakhleya	0–0	Ceramica Cleopatra	Cairo
21:15 EST (UTC+2)		Report		Stadium: Petrosport Stadium; Referee: Mohamed Al Ghazi

20 April 2023 26	Ceramica Cleopatra	0–0	Al Ittihad	Cairo
21:15 EST (UTC+2)		Report		Stadium: Al Salam Stadium; Referee: Mostafa Osman

26 April 2023 19	Zamalek	1–0	Ceramica Cleopatra	Cairo
20:30 EST (UTC+2)	Jaziri 11'	Report		Stadium: Cairo International Stadium; Referee: Abdelaziz El Sayed
Note: The game, which was initially slated for 21 February 2023, was postponed due to Zamalek's involvement in the CAF Champions League.

14 May 2023 28	Ceramica Cleopatra	0–0	Ghazl El Mahalla	Cairo
20:00 EST (UTC+3)		Report		Stadium: Cairo International Stadium; Attendance: 150; Referee: Mahmoud Ashour

24 May 2023 29	Future	1–0	Ceramica Cleopatra	Cairo
21:30 EST (UTC+3)	Atef 59'	Report		Stadium: Al Salam Stadium; Referee: Wael Farhan

29 May 2023 27	Al Ahly	1–0	Ceramica Cleopatra	Cairo
19:00 EST (UTC+2)	El Shahat 57'	Report		Stadium: Cairo International Stadium; Referee: Mohamed Adel
Note: The game, which was initially slated for 25 April 2023, was postponed.

2 June 2023 30	Ceramica Cleopatra	0–0	Pharco	Cairo
19:00 EST (UTC+3)		Report		Stadium: Osman Ahmed Osman Stadium; Referee: Mahmoud Nagi

7 June 2023 31	Smouha	2–2	Ceramica Cleopatra	Alexandria
21:30 EST (UTC+3)	Faisal 1'; Reda 14'	Report	Rayan 41'; Ibrahim 90+6' (pen.)	Stadium: Alexandria Stadium; Referee: Ahmed Ghandour

30 June 2023 32	Tala'ea El Gaish	0–0	Ceramica Cleopatra	Cairo
21:30 EST (UTC+3)		Report		Stadium: Gehaz El Reyada Stadium; Referee: Ibrahim Nour El Din

10 July 2023 33	Ceramica Cleopatra	2–1	Pyramids	Cairo
20:30 EST (UTC+3)	Mohsen 45+2', 83'	Report	Hafez 37'	Stadium: Osman Ahmed Osman Stadium; Referee: Mahmoud Ashour

15 July 2023 34	ENPPI	1–0	Ceramica Cleopatra	Cairo
19:00 EST (UTC+3)	El Agouz 65'	Report		Stadium: Petrosport Stadium; Referee: Shahenda El Maghribi

=== Egypt Cup ===
7 May 2023 Round of 32	Ceramica Cleopatra	5–0	Dekernes	Cairo
21:00 EST (UTC+3)	Gaber 9'; Rayyan 45+3' (pen.); Ramadan 53'; Gamal 59' (o.g.); Wayou 90+3'	Report		Stadium: Cairo International Stadium; Referee: Mostafa Medhat

22 June 2023 Round of 16	Al Mokawloon Al Arab	1–0	Ceramica Cleopatra	Cairo
21:30 EST (UTC+3)	Hinestroza 74'	Report		Stadium: Osman Ahmed Osman Stadium; Referee: Ahmed Gamal

=== EFA Cup ===
21 March 2023 Round of 16	Ceramica Cleopatra	1–1 (5–3 p)	Smouha	Cairo
17:00 EST (UTC+2)	Ibrahim 5' (pen.)		Haggag 15'	Stadium: Osman Ahmed Osman Stadium; Referee: Ibrahim Mahgoub
	Penalties
	Mohsen (penalty scored); Adel (penalty scored); Toni (penalty scored); Nabil (penalty scored); Shokry (penalty scored)		(penalty missed) Hassan; (penalty scored) Boateng; (penalty scored) Faisal; (penalty scored) Haggag

30 April 2023 Quarter-finals	National Bank	2–2 (3–4 p)	Ceramica Cleopatra	Cairo
18:30 EST (UTC+3)	I. Gaber 20'; Bambo 70'	Report	Ibrahim 45'; Mohsen 45+1'	Stadium: Cairo International Stadium; Referee: Ibrahim Mohamed
	Penalties
	Kaoud (penalty scored); I. Gaber (penalty scored); El Gazzar (penalty missed); Bambo (penalty scored); Fathy (penalty missed)		(penalty scored) Ibrahim; (penalty scored) M. Gaber; (penalty scored) Adel; (penalty scored) Nabil

26 June 2023 Semi-finals	Ceramica Cleopatra	0–0 (4–3 p)	Al Ittihad	Cairo
20:30 EST (UTC+3)		Report		Stadium: Cairo International Stadium; Referee: Wael Farhan

22 July 2023 Final	Al Masry	1–4	Ceramica Cleopatra	Alexandria
20:30 EST (UTC+3)	Greisha 54'	Report	Antar 6'; Mohsen 11'; Shokry 61'; Amadi 89'	Stadium: Borg El Arab Stadium; Attendance: 15,000; Referee: Ibrahim Nour El Din
