= 2023 Egyptian League Cup final =

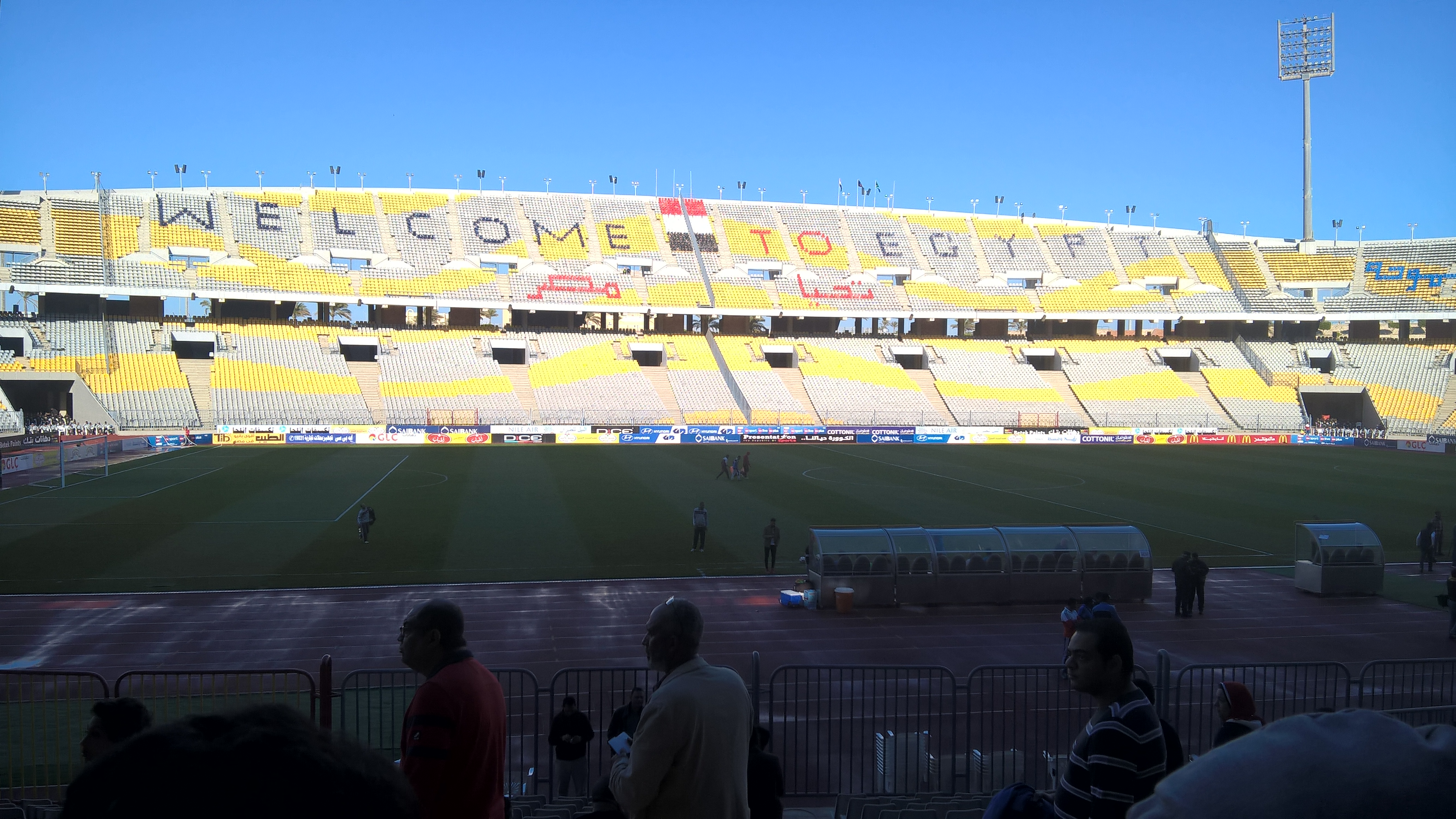
- Borg El Arab Stadium hosted the match
| Al Masry | Ceramica Cleopatra |
| 1 | 4 |
- Date: 22 July 2023
- Venue: Borg El Arab Stadium, Alexandria
- Man of the Match: Salah Mohsen (Ceramica Cleopatra)
- Referee: Ibrahim Nour El Din
- Attendance: 15,000
- Weather: Fair; 29 °C (84 °F); 72% humidity

The 2023 Egyptian League Cup final was the final match of the 2022–23 Egyptian League Cup, the second edition of the competition since its establishment in 2021. It was played between Al Masry and Ceramica Cleopatra on 22 July 2023 at Borg El Arab Stadium in Alexandria.

Al Masry were looking to win their first major title in 25 years, with their last honour being the 1998 Egypt Cup. Ceramica Cleopatra on the other side participated in a major competition final for the first time in the club's history. Ceramica Cleopatra won the match 4–1 and secured their first-ever League Cup and major title.

A total of 10,000 tickets were available to the public, and each club was given additional tickets estimated to be around 3,000 tickets.

== Route to the final ==
=== Al Masry ===
| Round | Opposition | Score |
|---|---|---|
| R16 | Al Ahly | w/o |
| QF | Ismaily | 2–0 |
| SF | Future | 0–0 (3–1 p.) |

Al Masry entered the competition from the round of 16, and were drawn against Al Ahly. Both clubs share a rivalry since the Port Said Stadium riot occurred in 2012, a disaster that resulted in the death of 74 attendees; 72 of which were Al Ahly fans. The match was scheduled to be played on 27 March 2023, but Al Ahly withdrew the match due to fixture congestion, after their request for postponement was rejected, as the club had a heavy and tight schedule during that period. In the quarter-finals, it was a Canal derby as Al Masry played against Ismaily on 29 April 2023. Al Masry won the match 2–0 with goals from Ragab Omran and Abdo Yehia. In the semi-finals, Al Masry played against the defending champions Future on 24 June 2023. The match ended goalless, and Al Masry won 3–1 on penalties.

=== Ceramica Cleopatra ===
| Round | Opposition | Score |
|---|---|---|
| R16 | Smouha | 1–1 (5–3 p.) |
| QF | National Bank of Egypt | 2–2 (4–3 p.) |
| SF | Al Ittihad | 0–0 (4–3 p.) |

Ceramica Cleopatra also entered the competition from the round of 16, and were drawn against Smouha. The match was played on 21 March 2023, and Ceramica won the tie 5–3 on penalties, after the original scoreline ended 1–1, with their only goal coming from club captain Mohamed Ibrahim. In the quarter-finals, Ceramica played against National Bank of Egypt on 30 April 2023. The match was decided by a penalty shoot-out that ended 4–3 in favor of Ceramica, after the match ended as a 2–2 draw, with Ibrahim and Salah Mohsen scoring the club's two goals. In the semi-finals, Ceramica played against Al Ittihad on 26 June 2023. The match ended goalless, and, for the third consecutive time for Ceramica, was decided on penalties, which resulted in Ceramica winning the shoot-outs 4–3.

== Venue ==
Unlike the previous final, which was played at the Cairo International Stadium in Cairo, the match was played at Borg El Arab Stadium in Alexandria, Egypt. It is one of the home venues for the Egypt national team, and occasionally hosts selected matches for different clubs in Egypt.

The last domestic final hosted at the stadium was the 2021 Egyptian Super Cup match on 21 September 2021 between Al Ahly and Tala'ea El Gaish, which was won by the latter 3–2 on penalties.

== Officials ==
The match officials were announced on 21 July 2023, one day before the final. Ibrahim Nour El Din was chosen as the head referee for the match, with Samir Gamal and Youssef El Bosaty as the assistant referees, and Mohamed El Sabahy as the fourth official. Mohamed El Hanafy was named the video assistant referee, and was assisted by Hany Abdel Fattah.

== Match ==
=== Details ===
22 July 2023
20:30 CAST

| Al Masry | 1–4 | Ceramica Cleopatra |
|---|---|---|
| Greisha 54' | Report | Antar 6'; Mohsen 11'; Shokry 61'; Amadi 89' |

Borg El Arab Stadium, Alexandria
Attendance: 15,000
Referee: Ibrahim Nour El Din

| Al Masry | Ceramica Cleopatra |

| GK | 1 | (Egypt) Essam Tharwat |
| RB | 7 | (Egypt) Karim El Eraki |
| CB | 8 | (Egypt) Amr Moussa (c) |
| CB | 30 | (Egypt) Islam Abou Salima | | (substituted off) 18' |
| LB | 13 | (Egypt) Amr El Saadawy | | (substituted off) 46' |
| CM | 20 | (Nigeria) Emeka Christian Eze |
| CM | 44 | (Egypt) Zeyad Kamal | | (substituted off) 46' |
| RW | 18 | (Algeria) Abderrahim Deghmoum | (yellow card) 8' | (substituted off) 40' |
| AM | 14 | (Tunisia) Elyes Jelassi |
| LW | 21 | (Egypt) Mohamed Grendo |
| CF | 19 | (Egypt) Marwan Hamdy |
Substitutes:
| GK | 27 | (Egypt) Mahmoud Gad |
| DF | 3 | (Algeria) Imadeddine Boubekeur | | (substituted on) 18' |
| DF | 17 | (Egypt) Hussein El Sayed | | (substituted on) 46' |
| DF | 25 | (Egypt) Ahmed Emad |
| MF | 10 | (Egypt) Hassan Ali |
| MF | 15 | (Egypt) Islam Attia | | (substituted on) 46' |
| MF | 26 | (Egypt) Hossam Greisha | | (substituted on) 40' |
| FW | 9 | (Egypt) Ragab Omran |
| FW | 37 | (Cameroon) Franck Etouga |
Manager:
(Egypt) Mimi Abdel Razek

| GK | 1 | (Egypt) Mohamed Bassam |
| RB | 2 | (Egypt) Ahmed Hany | | (substituted off) 73' |
| CB | 5 | (Egypt) Ragab Nabil |
| CB | 17 | (Egypt) Ahmed Ramadan | (yellow card) 22' |
| LB | 3 | (Egypt) Mohamed Shokry |
| CM | 14 | (Egypt) Mohamed Tony |
| CM | 21 | (Egypt) Mohamed Adel | | (substituted off) 58' |
| RW | 27 | (Egypt) Mido Gaber |
| AM | 20 | (Egypt) Mohamed Ibrahim (c) |
| LW | 10 | (Egypt) Mohamed Antar | (yellow card) 68' | (substituted off) 68' |
| CF | 7 | (Egypt) Salah Mohsen |
Substitutes:
| GK | 50 | (Egypt) Ali El Gabry |
| DF | 22 | (Egypt) Abdel Rahman Ramadan | | (substituted on) 73' |
| DF | 28 | (Tunisia) Seif Teka |
| MF | 8 | (Egypt) Mahmoud Nabil | | (substituted on) 58' |
| MF | 15 | (Egypt) Mahmoud Zalaka |
| MF | 26 | (Ghana) Justice Arthur |
| FW | 15 | (Egypt) Ahmed El Armouty |
| FW | 39 | (Nigeria) Ibrahim Ayoola |
| FW | 40 | (Nigeria) Samuel Amadi | | (substituted on) 68' |
Manager:
(Egypt) Ayman El Ramadi

Man of the Match:
Salah Mohsen (Ceramica Cleopatra)

Assistant referees:
Samir Gamal
Youssef El Bosaty
Fourth official:
Mohamed El Sabahy
Video assistant referee:
Mohamed El Hanafy
Assistant video assistant referee:
Hany Abdel Fattah

Match rules

- 90 minutes
- Penalty shoot-out if scores still level
- Nine named substitutes
- Maximum of five substitutions (Note: Each team was given only three opportunities to make substitutions, excluding substitutions made at half-time.)

=== Statistics ===
First half
| Statistic | Al Masry | Ceramica Cleopatra |
|---|---|---|
| Goals scored | 0 | 2 |
| Total shots | 7 | 11 |
| Shots on target | 3 | 4 |
| Ball possession | 52% | 48% |
| Corner kicks | 1 | 0 |
| Fouls committed | 5 | 12 |
| Offsides | 0 | 1 |
| Yellow cards | 1 | 1 |
| Red cards | 0 | 0 |

Second half
| Statistic | Al Masry | Ceramica Cleopatra |
|---|---|---|
| Goals scored | 1 | 2 |
| Total shots | 6 | 7 |
| Shots on target | 2 | 6 |
| Ball possession | 56% | 44% |
| Corner kicks | 3 | 3 |
| Fouls committed | 3 | 8 |
| Offsides | 0 | 0 |
| Yellow cards | 0 | 1 |
| Red cards | 0 | 0 |

Overall
| Statistic | Al Masry | Ceramica Cleopatra |
|---|---|---|
| Goals scored | 1 | 4 |
| Total shots | 13 | 18 |
| Shots on target | 5 | 10 |
| Ball possession | 54% | 46% |
| Corner kicks | 4 | 3 |
| Fouls committed | 8 | 20 |
| Offsides | 0 | 1 |
| Yellow cards | 1 | 2 |
| Red cards | 0 | 0 |
