= 2022–23 Smouha SC season =

Smouha SC
2022–23 season
- Chairman: Farag Amer
- Manager: Tarek El Ashry (until 24 January); Ahmed Samy (from 25 January)
- Stadium: Alexandria Stadium
- Egyptian Premier League: 10th
- Egypt Cup: Round of 16
- EFA Cup: Round of 16

The 2022–23 Smouha SC season was the club's 73rd season in existence and the 13th consecutive season in the topflight of Egyptian football. In addition to the domestic league, Smouha participated in this season's editions of the Egypt Cup and the EFA Cup.

== Players ==
=== First-team squad ===
Note: Flags indicate national team as defined under FIFA eligibility rules; some limited exceptions apply. Players may hold more than one non-FIFA nationality.

No.	Pos.	Nation	Player
1	GK	EGY	El Hany Soliman
2	DF	EGY	Mahmoud Moaaz
3	MF	EGY	Mohamed Abdelaati
4	DF	EGY	Ragab Nabil
5	DF	EGY	Mahmoud Ezzat
6	MF	EGY	Abdelrahman Amer
8	MF	ANG	Dasfáa Garcia Preira Dias
9	FW	EGY	Marwan Hamdi
10	FW	MAR	Abdelkabir El Ouadi
11	FW	EGY	Sherif Reda
12	DF	EGY	Mohamed Nadi
14	MF	EGY	Ahmed Homos
15	DF	EGY	Mohamed Shokry
16	FW	NGR	Sikiru Olatunbosun
17	MF	EGY	Mahmoud Abdelhalim

No.	Pos.	Nation	Player
18	FW	EGY	Fahd Gomaa
19	FW	EGY	Amar Sharaf Eldin
20	DF	EGY	Ahmed Gamal
21	GK	EGY	Omar Salah
24	DF	EGY	Ahmed Eid
25	MF	EGY	Alexander Jakobsen
26	DF	SDN	Athar El Tahir
27	MF	EGY	Omar Farouk
29	GK	EGY	Mohamed Ashraf
30	DF	EGY	Ahmed Ramadan
31	MF	EGY	Mohamed Metwaly
32	FW	EGY	Hussein Faisal
33	GK	EGY	Hussein Taimour
35	DF	EGY	Khaled Abdelfattah
9	FW	NGR	Junior Ajayi
44	MF	EGY	Ali Zaki
—	DF	QAT	Ahmed Abdelhay

== Transfers ==
=== In ===
No.	Pos	Player	Transferred from	Fee	Date	Source
3	MF	(Palestine) Mohammed Bassim	Free transfer		11 August 2022	
	DF	(Qatar) Ahmad Abdelhay	(Qatar) Al Kharaitiyat	Free	13 August 2022	
	DF	(Egypt) Ahmed Abdel Aziz	(Egypt) Pharco	Free	17 September 2022	
14	MF	(Egypt) Ahmed Mostafa	(Egypt) Ismaily	€105,000	1 October 2022	
27	FW	(Ghana) Benjamin Bernard Boateng	(Egypt) Al Ittihad	Loan	1 October 2022	
6	DF	(Egypt) Mahmoud Shabana	(Egypt) Zamalek	Loan	8 October 2022	
18	FW	(Egypt) Hossam Hassan	(Egypt) Al Ahly	Loan	4 January 2023	
30	MF	(Egypt) Ziad Tarek	(Egypt) Al Ahly	Loan	7 January 2023	
	DF	(Egypt) Mohamed El Maghrabi	(Egypt) Al Ahly	Loan	27 January 2023	

=== Out ===
No.	Pos	Player	Transferred to	Fee	Date	Source
	MF	(Egypt) Ismail Ashraf	(Egypt) Eastern Company	Free	22 September 2022	
	MF	(Egypt) Ahmed Refo	(Egypt) El Dakhleya		29 September 2022	
2	DF	(Egypt) Khaled Abdel Fattah	(Egypt) Al Ahly	Loan	5 January 2023	
6	DF	(Egypt) Mahmoud Shabana	(Egypt) Zamalek	Loan return	11 January 2023	
3	MF	(Palestine) Mohammed Bassim	Contract termination		12 January 2023	

== Pre-season and friendlies ==
Win Draw Loss Fixtures

28 September 2022 Friendly	Smouha (Egypt)	4–0	(Egypt) Al Hammam	Alexandria
		Report		Stadium: Alexandria Stadium

29 September 2022 Friendly	Smouha (Egypt)	1–2	(Egypt) El Qanah	Alexandria
		Report		Stadium: Alexandria Stadium

1 October 2022 Friendly	Smouha (Egypt)	1–1	(Egypt) Haras El Hodoud	Alexandria
	Nadi	Report	Gomaa

2 October 2022 Friendly	Smouha (Egypt)	0–0	(Egypt) Tanta	Alexandria
		Report

4 October 2022 Friendly	Smouha (Egypt)	1–1	(Egypt) Al Masry	Alexandria
	Moustafa 78'	Report	Hamdy 57'	Stadium: Alexandria Stadium

5 October 2022 Friendly	Smouha (Egypt)	0–0	(Egypt) National Bank	Alexandria
		Report		Stadium: Alexandria Stadium

7 October 2022 Friendly	Al Ittihad (Egypt)	1–0	(Egypt) Smouha	Alexandria
		Report		Stadium: Alexandria Stadium

8 October 2022 Friendly	Al Ittihad (Egypt)	0–0	(Egypt) Smouha	Alexandria
		Report		Stadium: Alexandria Stadium

9 November 2022 Friendly	Smouha (Egypt)	9–0	(Egypt) Amreya	Alexandria
	Abdelhalim; Essam; Liday; Said; Bassim	Report		Stadium: Alexandria Stadium

10 November 2022 Friendly	Smouha (Egypt)	2–0	(Egypt) Al Hammam	Alexandria
	Faisal; Nadi	Report		Stadium: Alexandria Stadium

== Competitions ==
=== Overview ===
Competition	First match	Last match	Starting round	Final position	Record							
Competition	First match	Last match	Starting round	Final position	Pld	W	D	L	GF	GA	GD	Win %
Egyptian Premier League	19 October 2022	15 July 2023	Matchday 1	10th	34	10	12	12	36	43	−7	29.41
Egypt Cup	7 May 2023	24 June 2023	Round of 32	Round of 16	2	1	0	1	2	2	+0	50.00
EFA Cup	21 March 2023		Round of 16	Round of 16	1	0	1	0	1	1	+0	0.00
Total					37	11	13	13	39	46	−7	29.73

Source: Soccerway

=== Egyptian Premier League ===
==== League table ====
Pos	Team	Pld	W	D	L	GF	GA	GD	Pts
8	Al Ittihad	34	12	7	15	36	43	−7	43
9	Pharco	34	9	15	10	31	34	−3	42 (Note: Head-to-head points: Pharco 6, Smouha 0.)
10	Smouha	34	10	12	12	36	43	−7	42
11	Ismaily	34	9	13	12	35	38	−3	40
12	National Bank of Egypt	34	9	12	13	35	40	−5	39

Source: Soccerway
Rules for classification: 1) Points; 2) Head-to-head points; 3) Head-to-head goal difference; 4) Goal difference; 5) Goals scored; 6) Play-off.

==== Results summary ====
Overall								Home						Away					
Pld	W	D	L	GF	GA	GD	Pts	W	D	L	GF	GA	GD	W	D	L	GF	GA	GD
26	7	10	9	26	31	−5	31	3	4	7	15	22	−7	4	6	2	11	9	+2

Last updated: 17 April 2023.
Source: worldfootball

==== Results by round ====
Round	1	2	3	4	5	6	7	8	9	10	11	12	13	14	15	16	17	18	19	20	21	22	23	24	25	26	27
Ground	A	H	A	H	A	H	A	H	A	H	A	H	H	A	H	A	H	A	A	H	A	H	A	H	A	H	A
Result	L	D	D	D	W	L	D	L	D	D	D	L	W	W	L	W	D	L	D	W	W	L	D	W	L	L	P
Position	16	13	13	13	11	14	10	12	13	13	13	14	12	11	11	10	10	12	12	12	9	10					

Updated to match(es) played on 17 April 2023. Source: worldfootball
A = Away; H = Home; W = Win; D = Draw; L = Loss

==== Matches ====
The league fixtures were announced on 9 October 2022.

19 October 2022 1	Zamalek	2–0	Smouha	Cairo
19:00 EST (UTC+2)	Reda 79' (o.g.); Akinyoola 90+4'	Report		Stadium: Osman Ahmed Osman Stadium; Referee: Nader Qamar El-Dawla

25 October 2022 2	Smouha	1–1	National Bank	Alexandria
17:00 EST (UTC+2)	Ougola 43'	Report	Helal 31' (pen.)	Stadium: Alexandria Stadium; Referee: Abdelaziz El Sayed

1 November 2022 3	Haras El Hodoud	0–0	Smouha	Alexandria
17:00 EST (UTC+2)		Report		Stadium: Haras El Hodoud Stadium; Referee: Ibrahim Nour El Din

2 December 2022 5	Ismaily	0–1	Smouha	Ismailia
14:45 EST (UTC+2)		Report	Sylla 25'	Stadium: Ismailia Stadium; Referee: Mohamed El Hanafi

8 December 2022 6	Smouha	1–2	Aswan	Alexandria
14:45 EST (UTC+2)	Boateng 7'	Report	Zaki 15', 38'	Stadium: Alexandria Stadium; Referee: Hamada Al Jalawi

11 December 2022 4	Smouha	0–0	Al Mokawloon Al Arab	Alexandria
17:00 EST (UTC+2)		Report		Stadium: Alexandria Stadium; Referee: Tarek Magdy

15 December 2022 7	El Dakhleya	0–0	Smouha	Cairo
17:00 EST (UTC+2)		Report		Stadium: Petrosport Stadium; Referee: Mostafa Osman

19 December 2022 8	Smouha	0–2	Al Ittihad	Alexandria
17:00 EST (UTC+2)		Report	Mabululu 79'; Hassan 90+2'	Stadium: Alexandria Stadium; Referee: Mohamed Adel

25 December 2022 9	Al Ahly	0–0	Smouha	Cairo
19:00 EST (UTC+2)		Report		Stadium: Al Ahly WE Al Salam Stadium; Referee: Ahmed El Ghandour

30 December 2022 10	Smouha	0–0	Ghazl El Mahalla	Alexandria
17:00 EST (UTC+2)		Report		Stadium: Alexandria Stadium; Referee: Mohammad Sabahi

3 January 2023 11	Future	1–1	Smouha	Cairo
20:00 EST (UTC+2)	Mohsen 18'; Ngwem (yellow card) 60'; Yaisien (yellow card) 82'	Report	Faisal 7'; Boateng (yellow card) 55'; Gamal (yellow card) 68'; Hakam (yellow card) 90+6'	Stadium: Al Salam Stadium; Referee: Wael Farhan

8 January 2023 12	Smouha	0–2	Pharco	Alexandria
19:00 EST (UTC+2)		Report	Hamroune 37'; Gamal 45'	Stadium: Alexandria Stadium; Referee: Ibrahim Nour El Din

11 January 2023 13	Smouha	2–1	Tala'ea El Gaish	Alexandria
14:45 EST (UTC+2)	Hassan 25', 79'; Soliman (yellow card) 86'; Abd Rabo (yellow card) 90+5'	Report	Mansour 49'; Fathallah (yellow card) 68'	Stadium: Alexandria Stadium; Referee: Mahmoud Nassif

20 January 2023 14	Ceramica Cleopatra	0–2	Smouha	Cairo
19:00 EST (UTC+2)		Report	Essam 38'; Saeed (yellow card) 39'; Nadi (yellow card) 78'; Boateng 90'	Stadium: Cairo International Stadium; Referee: Ahmed Ghandour

24 January 2023 15	Smouha	1–2	Pyramids	Alexandria
19:00 EST (UTC+2)	Gamal (yellow card) 28'; Faisal 30'; Boateng (yellow card) 69'	Report	Sobhi 16', (yellow card) 69'; Fathi 56'; Abdelaati (yellow card) 75'; Galal (red card) 84'; Fathy (yellow card) 87'	Stadium: Alexandria Stadium; Referee: Mohamed El Hanafi

29 January 2023 16	ENPPI	0–2	Smouha	Cairo
14:45 EST (UTC+2)	Shakshak (yellow card) 54'; Abdel Aati (yellow card) 82'	Report	Shabana 25'; Mostafa 55'	Stadium: Petrosport Stadium; Referee: Mahmoud Nagi

7 February 2023 17	Smouha	1–1	Al Masry	Borg El Arab
14:45 EST (UTC+2)	Essam 82'	Report	Ateia 13'	Stadium: Borg El Arab Stadium; Referee: Mohamed Maarouf

13 February 2023 18	Smouha	1–3	Zamalek	Borg El Arab
19:00 EST (UTC+2)	El Sabahi 90'	Report	Shikabala 35'; Zizo (penalty missed) 26', 39', 42'	Stadium: Borg El Arab Stadium; Referee: Ibrahim Nour El Din

19 February 2023 19	National Bank	2–2	Smouha	Cairo
17:00 EST (UTC+2)	Simporé 15'; Yasser 61'	Report	Hassan 59'; Saad 76'	Stadium: Petrosport Stadium; Referee: Mohammed Yousef

26 February 2023 20	Smouha	3–0	Haras El Hodoud	Borg El Arab
17:00 EST (UTC+2)	Hassan 12', 87' (pen.); Boateng 90+5'	Report		Stadium: Borg El Arab Stadium; Referee: Galal Ahmed

11 March 2023 21	Al Mokawloon Al Arab	0–1	Smouha	Cairo
19:00 EST (UTC+2)		Report	Faisal 24'	Stadium: Osman Ahmed Osman Stadium; Referee: Khaled Gamal

30 March 2023 22	Smouha	1–3	Ismaily	Alexandria
21:15 EST (UTC+2)	Baayou 41'	Report	Madbouly 20'; Magdy 38'; El Shamy 40'; El Mohamady (penalty missed) 78'	Stadium: Alexandria Stadium; Referee: Mohamed Salama

4 April 2023 23	Aswan	1–1	Smouha	Aswan
21:15 EST (UTC+2)	Zaky 90+2'	Report	Boateng 37'	Stadium: Aswan Stadium; Referee: Walid Abdelrazek

9 April 2023 24	Smouha	4–3	El Dakhleya	Alexandria
21:15 EST (UTC+2)	Hassan 2'; Boateng 21', 33'; Ougola 43'	Report	Kyambadde 24'; Fekri 71' (pen.); El Sayed 88' (pen.)	Stadium: Alexandria Stadium; Referee: Nader Kamar

14 April 2023 25	Al Ittihad	3–1	Smouha	Alexandria
21:15 EST (UTC+2)	Mabululu 6', 81'; Elkalamawy 89'	Report	Essam 89'	Stadium: Alexandria Stadium; Referee: Mostafa El Shahdi

17 April 2023 26	Smouha	0–2	Al Ahly	Borg El Arab
21:15 EST (UTC+2)		Report	Sherif 28'; Kahraba 66'	Stadium: Borg El Arab Stadium; Referee: Tarek Magdy

26 April 2023 27	Ghazl El Mahalla	0–2	Smouha	El Mahalla El Kubra
16:00 EST (UTC+2)		Report		Stadium: Ghazl El Mahalla Stadium

=== Egypt Cup ===
7 May 2023 Round of 32	Smouha	2–1	Alo Egypt	Alexandria
18:00 EST (UTC+2)				Stadium: Alexandria Stadium

=== EFA Cup ===
21 March 2023 Round of 16	Ceramica Cleopatra	1–1 (5–3 p)	Smouha	Cairo
17:00 EST (UTC+2)	Ibrahim 5' (pen.)		Haggag 15'	Stadium: Osman Ahmed Osman Stadium
	Penalties
	Mohsen (penalty scored); Adel (penalty scored); Toni (penalty scored); Nabil (penalty scored); Shokry (penalty scored)		(penalty missed) Hassan; (penalty scored) Boateng; (penalty scored) Faisal; (penalty scored) Haggag
