= 2022–23 Aswan SC season =

Aswan SC
2022–23 season
- President: El-Shafei Saleh
- Head coach: Rabie Yassin (until 29 October); Ayman El-Ramady (from 6 November)
- Stadium: Aswan Stadium
- Egyptian Premier League: 16th (relegated)
- Egypt Cup: Round of 32
- EFA Cup: Preliminary round
- Top goalscorer: League: Mohamed Hamdy Zaky (10); All: Mohamed Hamdy Zaky (10)

The 2022–23 Aswan SC season was the club's 93rd season in existence and the first season back in the topflight of Egyptian football. In addition to the domestic league, Aswan participated in this season's editions of the Egypt Cup and the EFA Cup.

== Players ==
As of 10 October 2022.

No.	Pos.	Nation	Player
1	GK	EGY	Khaled Walid
2	DF	EGY	Ahmed Belia
3	DF	EGY	Ahmed Dahroug
4	DF	EGY	Ahmed Castelo
5	DF	EGY	Abdelrahman Abdelnabi
6	DF	EGY	Mahmoud Naim
7	FW	GAB	Malick Evouna
8	MF	EGY	Abdelaziz Mousa
9	FW	EGY	Mohamed Hamdy
10	FW	MAR	Ahmed Belhadji
11	DF	EGY	Mido Mostafa (on loan from National Bank of Egypt)
12	FW	EGY	Gedo
13	GK	EGY	Islam Soliman
14	MF	EGY	Emad Fathy
15	MF	EGY	Mostafa Abdelrasoul
16	GK	EGY	Amr Hossam (on loan from Eastern Company)

No.	Pos.	Nation	Player
17	DF	EGY	El Husseini Samir
18	FW	ANG	Dilson
19	DF	EGY	Islam Gamal
20	DF	EGY	Saber El Shimi
21	FW	EGY	Ahmed Khalid
22	MF	EGY	Ibrahim Ayesh
23	FW	EGY	Mahmoud Salah
24	FW	EGY	Ahmed Hamoudi
25	DF	EGY	Mohamed Atwa (on loan from El Gouna)
26	MF	NGR	Raphael Ayagwa
27	DF	EGY	Ali Fathy
30	DF	EGY	Islam Salah
32	FW	EGY	Gamal El Said
37	MF	EGY	Mostafa Anani
74	MF	EGY	Amr Reda
99	FW	NED	Bai Kamara

== Transfers ==
=== In ===
No.	Pos	Player	Transferred from	Fee	Date	Source
7	FW	(Gabon) Malick Evouna	(Gabon) AS Pélican	Free	4 July 2022	
10	MF	(Spain) Ahmed Belhadji	(Angola) Inter Club d'Escaldes	Free	23 July 2022	
	MF	(Egypt) Ibrahim Ayesh	(Egypt) Wadi Degla	Free	1 August 2022	
9	MF	(Egypt) Mohamed Hamdy Zaky	(Egypt) Al Mokawloon Al Arab	Free	20 September 2022	
24	FW	(Egypt) Ahmed Hamoudi	(Egypt) Al Masry	Free	5 October 2022	
	MF	(Egypt) Alaa Salama	(Egypt) Pharco	Loan	7 January 2023	
	MF	(Egypt) Hossam Arafat	(Egypt) ENPPI	Free	30 January 2023	
	MF	(Egypt) Mohamed Morsi	(Egypt) ENPPI	Free	30 January 2023	

=== Out ===
No.	Pos	Player	Transferred to	Fee	Date	Source
10	MF	(Spain) Ahmed Belhadji	(Egypt) Zamalek	Loan	31 January 2023	

== Pre-season and friendlies ==
Win Draw Loss Fixtures

25 September 2022 Friendly	Al Ahly (Egypt)	2–1	(Egypt) Aswan	Cairo
	Mohamed; Hassan		Khaled	Stadium: Mokhtar El Tetsh Stadium

3 October 2022 Friendly	Al Ittihad (Egypt)	2–2	(Egypt) Aswan	Alexandria
		Report		Stadium: Borg El Arab Stadium

10 October 2022 Friendly	Aswan (Egypt)	5–2	(Sudan) Hilal Alsahil
		Report

14 February 2023 Friendly	Ismaily (Egypt)	0–1	(Egypt) Aswan	Ismailia
		Report	Mohamed	Stadium: Ismailia Stadium

21 March 2023 Friendly	Haras El Hodoud (Egypt)	2–1	(Egypt) Aswan
		Report

22 March 2023 Friendly	Ceramica Cleopatra (Egypt)	2–1	(Egypt) Aswan	Cairo
	Wayou 15'; Shikodi 40'	Report	Kamone 50'	Stadium: Air Defense Stadium subfield

== Competitions ==
=== Overview ===
Competition	First match	Last match	Starting round	Final position	Record							
Competition	First match	Last match	Starting round	Final position	Pld	W	D	L	GF	GA	GD	Win %
Egyptian Premier League	18 October 2022	14 July 2023	Matchday 1		34	8	9	17	31	45	−14	23.53
Egypt Cup	7 May 2023		Round of 32	Round of 32	1	0	1	0	2	2	+0	0.00
EFA Cup	19 November 2022		Preliminary round	Preliminary round	1	0	1	0	0	0	+0	0.00
Total					36	8	11	17	33	47	−14	22.22

Source: Soccerway

=== Egyptian Premier League ===
==== League table ====
Pos	Team	Pld	W	D	L	GF	GA	GD	Pts	Qualification or relegation
14	Tala'ea El Gaish	34	8	12	14	33	45	−12	36	
15	El Dakhleya	34	7	14	13	32	43	−11	35	
16	Aswan (R)	34	8	9	17	31	45	−14	33 (Note: Tied on head-to-head points (3) and on head-to-head goal difference (0). Overall goal difference: Aswan −14, Ghazl El Mahalla −21.)	Relegation to Second Division A
17	Ghazl El Mahalla (R)	34	8	9	17	26	47	−21	33	Relegation to Second Division A
18	Haras El Hodoud (R)	34	5	10	19	21	45	−24	25	Relegation to Second Division A

Source: Soccerway
Rules for classification: 1) Points; 2) Head-to-head points; 3) Head-to-head goal difference; 4) Goal difference; 5) Goals scored; 6) Play-off.
(R) Relegated

==== Results summary ====
Overall								Home						Away					
Pld	W	D	L	GF	GA	GD	Pts	W	D	L	GF	GA	GD	W	D	L	GF	GA	GD
29	8	7	14	27	37	−10	31	4	5	6	15	19	−4	4	2	8	12	18	−6

Last updated: 23 May 2023.
Source: worldfootball

==== Results by round ====
Round	1	2	3	4	5	6	7	8	9	10	11	12	13	14	15	16	17	18	19	20	21	22	23	24	25	26	27	28	29
Ground	H	A	H	A	H	A	A	A	H	A	H	A	H	A	H	H	A	A	H	A	H	A	H	H	H	A	H	A	H
Result	L	L	L	L	W	W	L	L	W	W	W	D	D	L	D	D	W	L	L	W	L	D	D	D	L	L	W	L	L
Position	14	17	18	18	15	13	15	16	11	9	8	9	9	9	9	9	8	9	9	9	12	12	12						

Updated to match(es) played on 23 May 2023. Source: worldfootball
A = Away; H = Home; W = Win; D = Draw; L = Loss

==== Matches ====
The league fixtures were announced on 9 October 2022.

18 October 2022 1	Aswan	0–1	Al Ittihad	Aswan
15:00 EST (UTC+2)		Report	Amutu 85'	Stadium: Aswan Stadium; Referee: Mohamed Maarouf

23 October 2022 2	Al Ahly	1–0	Aswan	Cairo
19:00 EST (UTC+2)	Maâloul 17' (pen.)	Report		Stadium: Al Ahly WE Al Salam Stadium; Referee: Ahmed Ghandour

29 October 2022 3	Aswan	0–1	Ghazl El Mahalla	Aswan
15:00 EST (UTC+2)		Report	El Sheikh 90'	Stadium: Aswan Stadium; Referee: Ahmed Gamal

23 November 2022 4	Future	2–1	Aswan	Cairo
17:00 EST (UTC+2)	Atef 47'; Lasheen 90+3' (pen.)	Report	Belhadji 44' (pen.)	Stadium: Al Salam Stadium; Referee: Mahmoud Nagi

1 December 2022 5	Aswan	1–0	Pharco	Aswan
14:45 EST (UTC+2)	Belhadji 31'	Report		Stadium: Aswan Stadium; Referee: Ibrahim Nour El Din

8 December 2022 6	Smouha	1–2	Aswan	Alexandria
14:45 EST (UTC+2)	Boateng 7'	Report	Zaky 15', 38'	Stadium: Alexandria Stadium; Referee: Hamada Al Jalawi

15 December 2022 7	Ceramica Cleopatra	3–2	Aswan	Cairo
14:45 EST (UTC+2)	Shokry 31'; Ebuka 72'; Teka 90+2'	Report	Mido 74'; Zaky 89'	Stadium: Cairo International Stadium; Referee: Walid Abdelrazek

19 December 2022 8	Pyramids	2–1	Aswan	Cairo
19:00 EST (UTC+2)	Fathi 52'; Hamdy 64'	Report	Kamone 90+3'	Stadium: 30 June Stadium; Referee: Wael Farhan

24 December 2022 9	Aswan	2–0	ENPPI	Aswan
14:45 EST (UTC+2)	Zaky 18'; Kamone 42'	Report		Stadium: Aswan Stadium; Referee: Mohamed Adel

29 December 2022 10	Al Masry	1–2	Aswan	Suez
17:00 EST (UTC+2)	Jelassi 6' (pen.)	Report	Belhadji (penalty missed) 35'; Salah 39'; Evouna 90+10' (pen.)	Stadium: Suez Stadium; Referee: Tarek Magdy

2 January 2023 11	Aswan	2–1	Zamalek	Aswan
14:45 EST (UTC+2)	Abdel Ghani 4' (o.g.); Ayagwa (yellow card) 21'; Kamone 45+2'; Salah (yellow card) 55'	Report	Emad (yellow card) 38'; Abdul-Majeed 56'; Zizo (yellow card) 89'	Stadium: Aswan Stadium; Referee: Amin Omar

8 January 2023 12	National Bank	0–0	Aswan	Cairo
14:45 EST (UTC+2)	Yassin (yellow card) 18'; Yasser (yellow card) 25'; El Gazzar (yellow card) 64'	Report	Mostafa (yellow card) 68'; Abdel Rasoul (yellow card) 81'	Stadium: Cairo International Stadium; Referee: Sobhy El Amrawi

13 January 2023 13	Aswan	1–1	Haras El Hodoud	Aswan
14:45 EST (UTC+2)	Zaky (yellow card) 36'; Atwa (yellow card) 73'; Nagy 90+1'	Report	Gamal 74' (pen.); Mahmoud (yellow card) 81'	Stadium: Aswan Stadium; Referee: Mohamed Kabil

19 January 2023 14	Al Mokawloon Al Arab	1–0	Aswan	Cairo
14:45 EST (UTC+2)	Saviola 25'; Fayed (yellow card) 67'; Okoli (yellow card) 90+6'	Report		Stadium: Osman Ahmed Osman Stadium; Referee: Mostafa El Shahdi

23 January 2023 15	Aswan	0–0	Ismaily	Aswan
14:45 EST (UTC+2)	Belhadji (penalty missed) 27'; Ayagwa (yellow card) 31'	Report	El Shamy (yellow card) 45'; Madbouly (yellow card) 62'; Hassan (yellow card) 72'	Stadium: Aswan Stadium; Referee: Tarek Magdy

27 January 2023 16	Aswan	2–2	Tala'ea El Gaish	Aswan
14:45 EST (UTC+2)	Ayagwa (yellow card) 17'; Zaky 22'; Belhadji 59'; Kamone (yellow card) 79'; Salah (yellow card) 90+10'	Report	Wadi 45+4' (pen.); Gaber 46'; Diab (yellow card) 81'; Shaaban (yellow card) 90+3'; Ayman (yellow card) 90+10'	Stadium: Aswan Stadium; Referee: Mohamed Salama

5 February 2023 17	El Dakhleya	1–2	Aswan	Cairo
14:45 EST (UTC+2)	Fekri 28' (pen.)	Report	Khaled 1'; Zaky 40'	Stadium: Petrosport Stadium; Referee: Wael Farhan

9 February 2023 18	Al Ittihad	2–0	Aswan	Borg El Arab
14:45 EST (UTC+2)	Hassan 51'; Mabululu 63'	Report		Stadium: Borg El Arab Stadium; Referee: Ibrahim Mohamed

21 February 2023 19	Aswan	0–3	Al Ahly	Aswan
14:45 EST (UTC+2)	Khaled (penalty missed) 44'	Report	Kahraba 34'; Abdel Kader 41'; Afsha 45+2'	Stadium: Aswan Stadium; Referee: Mahmoud El Banna

27 February 2023 20	Ghazl El Mahalla	1–2	Aswan	El Mahalla El Kubra
15:00 EST (UTC+2)	Ekpenyong 74'	Report	Zaky 25'; Arafat 69'	Stadium: Ghazl El Mahalla Stadium; Referee: Ali El Said

12 March 2023 21	Aswan	1–2	Future	Aswan
15:00 EST (UTC+2)	Evouna 79'	Report	Walid 7'; Zaazaa 78'	Stadium: Aswan Stadium; Referee: Sayed Shabaan

31 March 2023 22	Pharco	0–0	Aswan	Borg El Arab
21:15 EST (UTC+2)		Report		Stadium: Borg El Arab Stadium; Referee: Ahmed Nasser

4 April 2023 23	Aswan	1–1	Smouha	Aswan
21:15 EST (UTC+2)	Zaky 90+2'	Report	Boateng 37'	Stadium: Aswan Stadium; Referee: Walid Abdelrazek

7 April 2023 24	Aswan	1–1	Ceramica Cleopatra	Aswan
21:15 EST (UTC+2)	Dilson 44'	Report	Rayan 23'	Stadium: Aswan Stadium; Referee: Mahmoud Bassiouni

14 April 2023 25	Aswan	0–3	Pyramids	Aswan
21:15 EST (UTC+2)		Report	Lakay 31', 90+1' (pen.); Touré 90+3'	Stadium: Aswan Stadium; Referee: Tarek Magdy

18 April 2023 26	ENPPI	2–0	Aswan	Cairo
21:15 EST (UTC+2)	Amin 9'; Fathy 51' (o.g.)	Report		Stadium: Petrosport Stadium; Referee: Sobhy El Amrawi

3 May 2023 27	Aswan	3–1	Al Masry	Borg El Arab
20:00 EST (UTC+3)	Zaky 20' (pen.), 38'; El Sayed 45+4'	Report	Grendo 14' (pen.)	Stadium: Borg El Arab Stadium; Referee: Ibrahim Nour El Din
Note: The game, which was initially slated for 26 April 2023, was postponed.

18 May 2023 28	Zamalek	1–0	Aswan	Cairo
20:00 EST (UTC+3)	Ndiaye 45'	Report		Stadium: Cairo International Stadium; Referee: Mohammed Yousef

23 May 2023 29	Aswan	1–2	National Bank	Aswan
19:00 EST (UTC+3)	Zaky 51'	Report	Bambo 66'; Helal 77' (pen.)	Stadium: Aswan Stadium; Referee: Mohamed El Hanafi

=== Egypt Cup ===
7 May 2023 Round of 32	El Dakhleya	2–2 (4–3 p)	Aswan	Cairo
18:00 EST (UTC+3)				Stadium: Petrosport Stadium

=== EFA Cup ===
19 November 2022 Preliminary round	Aswan	0–0 (a.e.t.) (1–3 p)	Ghazl El Mahalla	Aswan
15:00 EST (UTC+2)		Report		Stadium: Aswan Stadium; Referee: Hesham El Kady
	Penalties
	Zaky (penalty scored); Fathy (penalty missed); Anani (penalty missed); Dilson (penalty missed)		(penalty scored) El-Henawy; (penalty missed) Bazoka; (penalty missed) Mao; (penalty scored) El Shabrawi; (penalty scored) Gaber
