= 2022–23 Egyptian League Cup =

بطولة كأس رابطة الأندية المحترفة
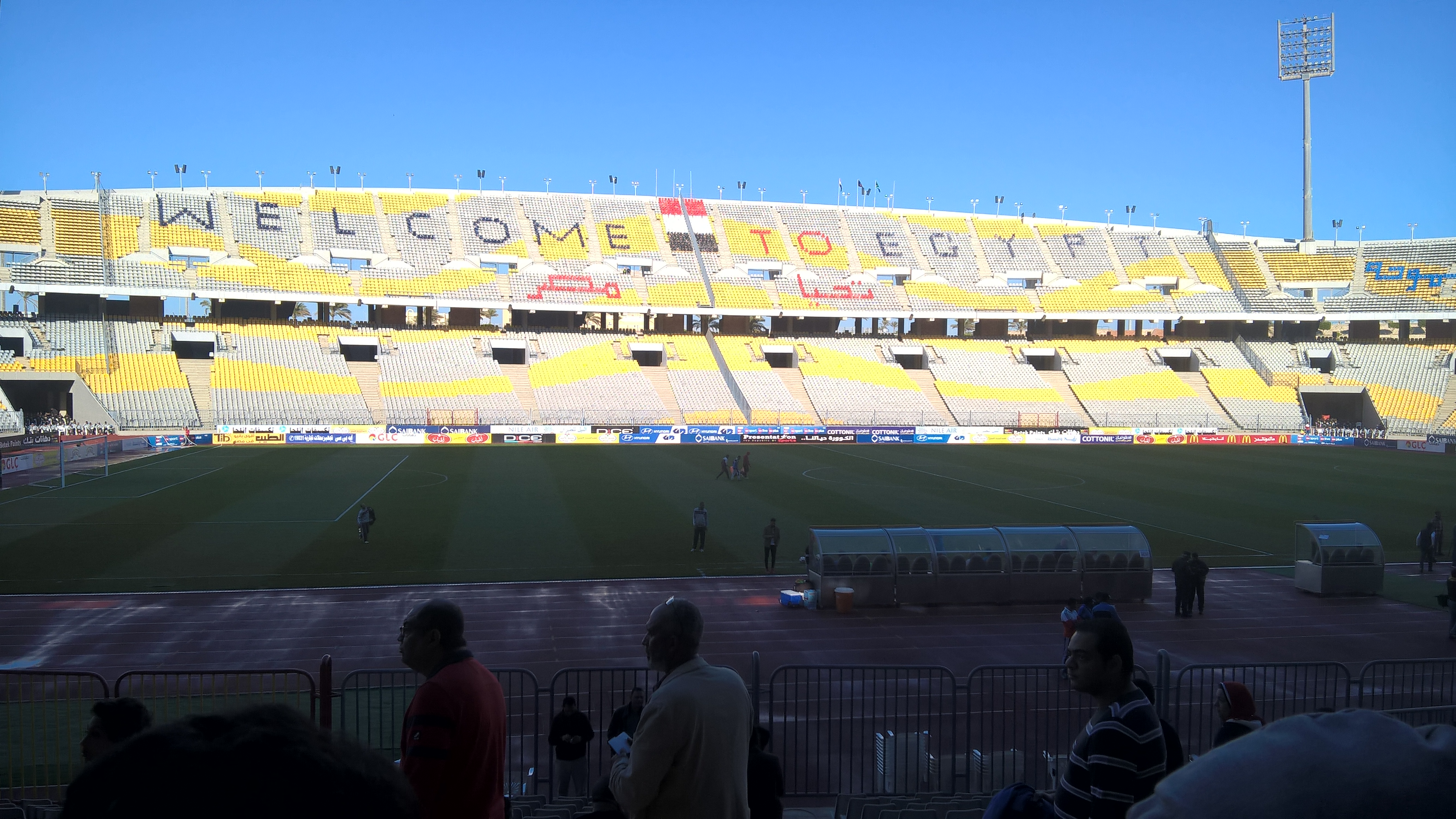
- Borg El Arab Stadium hosted the final

Tournament details
- Country: Egypt
- Dates: 19 November 2022 – 22 July 2023
- Teams: 17

Final positions
- Champions: Ceramica Cleopatra (1st title)
- Runners-up: Al Masry

Tournament statistics
- Matches played: 16
- Goals scored: 33 (2.06 per match)
- Top goal scorer(s): Ahmed Adel; Karim Bambo; Mohamed Ibrahim; Salah Mohsen (2 goals each)

The 2022–23 Egyptian League Cup was the second edition of the Egyptian League Cup. The competition was open to all clubs participating in the Egyptian Premier League.

Future were the defending champion, having won the inaugural tournament after beating Ghazl El Mahalla 5–1 in the final, but were eliminated by Al Masry in the semi-finals after losing on penalties.

The final was played at Borg El Arab Stadium in Alexandria on 22 July 2023 between Al Masry and Ceramica Cleopatra, with Ceramica Cleopatra winning 4–1 for their first-ever League Cup and major title.

== Format ==
The format was changed from the previous edition, in the sense that it would be a complete knockout competition. The preliminary round consists of the 3 newly promoted teams from the Second Division and the team that finished 15th in the league, just one spot above the relegation zone.

In the preliminary round, extra time is played if both teams are tied after the original time. If both teams are still tied, then penalties are played to decide the winner. In the rest of the competition, matches are decided directly by penalties if both teams are tied after 90 minutes.

== Competition ==
=== Preliminary round ===
The draw for the preliminary round was held on 9 November 2022. The two fixtures in this round were both played on 19 November 2022.

All times are CAT (UTC+2).

19 November 2022	Aswan	0–0 (a.e.t.) (1–3 p)	Ghazl El Mahalla	Aswan
15:00		Report		Stadium: Aswan Stadium; Referee: Hesham El Kadi
	Penalties
	Zaky (penalty scored); Fathy (penalty missed); Anani (penalty missed); Dilson (penalty missed)		(penalty scored) El Henawy; (penalty missed) Bazoka; (penalty missed) Mao; (penalty scored) El Shabrawi; (penalty scored) Gaber

19 November 2022	El Dakhleya	1–2 (a.e.t.)	Haras El Hodoud	Cairo
18:00	Alfred 77'	Report	Gamal 71' (pen.); David 110'	Stadium: Petrosport Stadium; Referee: Sayed Shaaban

=== Round of 16 ===
The draw for the round of 16 was held on 14 March 2023, with matches scheduled to take place from 19 to 27 March 2023.

All times are CAT (UTC+2).

19 March 2023	Al Mokawloon Al Arab	0–0 (5–6 p)	Haras El Hodoud	Cairo
17:00		Report		Stadium: Osman Ahmed Osman Stadium; Referee: Amr Ramadan
	Penalties
	Alaa (penalty scored); Abed (penalty scored); Ochaya (penalty missed); Okoli (penalty scored); Eid (penalty scored); Gebna (penalty scored); El Gohary (penalty missed)		(penalty missed) Gamal; (penalty scored) Yasser; (penalty scored) El Kadi; (penalty scored) Ali; (penalty scored) Ziko; (penalty scored) Abdel Hakim; (penalty scored) Ayman

20 March 2023	Ghazl El Mahalla	1–1 (6–7 p)	Ismaily	El Mahalla El Kubra
16:00	Mao 43'	Report	Chaouat 3'	Stadium: Ghazl El Mahalla Stadium; Referee: Mohamed El Ghazi
	Penalties
	El Sheikh (penalty scored); Samy (penalty scored); Mao (penalty scored); Mostafa (penalty scored); Gaber (penalty scored); Reda (penalty scored); El Nadry (penalty missed)		(penalty scored) El Mohamady; (penalty scored) Chaouat; (penalty scored) El Wahsh; (penalty scored) Desouki; (penalty scored) Madbouly; (penalty scored) Hamdy; (penalty scored) Annor

20 March 2023	Al Ittihad	2–2 (7–6 p)	Pharco	Alexandria
19:00	Adel 48'; Mahmoud 72'	Report	Mody 43' (pen.); Sokari 90+7'	Stadium: Alexandria Stadium; Referee: Mahmoud Wafa
	Penalties
	Alaa (penalty scored); El Ghandour (penalty scored); Salem (penalty missed); Salifu (penalty scored); Sobhi (penalty scored); Raheel (penalty scored); Abdel Aziz (penalty scored); Amutu (penalty scored)		(penalty scored) Sokari; (penalty scored) Naguib; (penalty scored) Emad; (penalty scored) Sherif; (penalty missed) Sabry; (penalty scored) Abdel Naser; (penalty scored) Kamel; (penalty missed) Awad

21 March 2023	Ceramica Cleopatra	1–1 (5–3 p)	Smouha	Cairo
17:00	Ibrahim 5' (pen.)	Report	Haggag 15'	Stadium: Osman Ahmed Osman Stadium; Referee: Ibrahim Mahgoub
	Penalties
	Mohsen (penalty scored); Adel (penalty scored); Tony (penalty scored); Nabil (penalty scored); Shokry (penalty scored)		(penalty missed) Hassan; (penalty scored) Boateng; (penalty scored) Faisal; (penalty scored) Haggag

25 March 2023	Future	0–0 (3–1 p)	Tala'ea El Gaish	Cairo
21:15		Report		Stadium: Petrosport Stadium; Referee: Ahmed Hamdy
	Penalties
	Mohsen (penalty missed); Maher (penalty scored); Ali (penalty missed); Reda (penalty scored); Adel (penalty scored)		(penalty missed) Stouhi; (penalty missed) El Khawaga; (penalty scored) Sherif; (penalty missed) Magdy

26 March 2023 (Note: The Pyramids v ENPPI, originally scheduled to be played on 25 March 2023, match was postponed for 24 hours day due to the 30 June Stadium hosting a match involving the Egypt national team in the 2023 African Cup of Nations qualifiers.)	Pyramids	1–1 (5–6 p)	ENPPI	Cairo
21:15	Hafez 89'	Report	Naser 85'	Stadium: 30 June Stadium; Referee: Mohamed El Atabani
	Penalties
	El Said (penalty scored); El Karti (penalty scored); Hafez (penalty missed); Tawfik (penalty scored); Samy (penalty scored); Fathy (penalty scored); Chibi (penalty missed)		(penalty scored) Fawzi; (penalty missed) Youssef; (penalty scored) Hamed; (penalty scored) Amin; (penalty scored) Kalosha; (penalty scored) Zayed; (penalty scored) Kabou

26 March 2023	Zamalek	0–3	National Bank of Egypt	Cairo
21:15		Report	Bambo 84'; Helal 87'; Gomaa 90+1' (o.g.)	Stadium: Osman Ahmed Osman Stadium (Note: The Zamalek v National Bank of Egypt match, originally scheduled to be played at the Cairo International Stadium, was played at Osman Ahmed Osman Stadium instead due to maintenance.); Referee: Mostafa Osman

27 March 2023	Al Ahly	w/o (Note: Al Ahly withdrew the match due to fixture congestion, after their request for postponement was rejected.)	Al Masry	Alexandria
21:15		Report		Stadium: Borg El Arab Stadium

=== Quarter-finals ===
The draw for the quarter-finals was held on 14 March 2023, after the round of 16 draw. All matches were played between 28 and 30 April 2023.

All times are CAST (UTC+3).

28 April 2023	Al Ittihad	3–2	ENPPI	Alexandria
19:00	Kalosha 63' (o.g.); Mabululu 68'; Adel 71'	Report	Kalosha 53'; Amin 80'	Stadium: Alexandria Stadium; Attendance: 2,000; Referee: Mahmoud Roushdy

29 April 2023	Al Masry	2–0	Ismaily	Alexandria
19:00	Omran 8'; Yehia 73'	Report		Stadium: Borg El Arab Stadium; Referee: Khaled El Ghandour

30 April 2023	National Bank of Egypt	2–2 (3–4 p)	Ceramica Cleopatra	Cairo
18:30	I. Gaber 20'; Bambo 70'	Report	Ibrahim 45'; Mohsen 45+1'	Stadium: Cairo International Stadium; Referee: Ibrahim Mohamed
	Penalties
	Kaoud (penalty scored); I. Gaber (penalty scored); El Gazzar (penalty missed); Bambo (penalty scored); Fathy (penalty missed)		(penalty scored) Ibrahim; (penalty scored) M. Gaber; (penalty scored) Adel; (penalty scored) Nabil

30 April 2023	Haras El Hodoud	0–1	Future	Cairo
21:00		Report	El Kadi 9' (o.g.)	Stadium: Petrosport Stadium; Referee: Sabry Ibrahim

=== Semi-finals ===
The draw for the semi-finals was held on 14 March 2023, after the previous rounds' draw. The two fixtures in this round were played on 24 and 26 June 2023.

All times are CAST (UTC+3).

24 June 2023	Al Masry	0–0 (3–1 p)	Future	Alexandria
21:30		Report		Stadium: Borg El Arab Stadium; Referee: Mohamed El Hanafy
	Penalties
	Jelassi (penalty scored); Moussa (penalty scored); Ali (penalty missed); Eze (penalty scored)		(penalty missed) Lasheen; (penalty missed) Maher; (penalty scored) Taha; (penalty missed) Farouk

26 June 2023	Ceramica Cleopatra	0–0 (4–3 p)	Al Ittihad	Cairo
20:30		Report		Stadium: Cairo International Stadium; Referee: Wael Farhan
	Penalties
	Ibrahim (penalty scored); Shokry (penalty missed); Adel (penalty scored); Nabil (penalty scored); Tony (penalty scored)		(penalty missed) Saleh; (penalty scored) El Ghandour; (penalty scored) Mabululu; (penalty missed) Salifu; (penalty scored) Mahmoud

=== Final ===
22 July 2023
20:30 CAST

Al Masry	1–4	Ceramica Cleopatra
Greisha 54'	Report	Antar 6'; Mohsen 11'; Shokry 61'; Amadi 89'

Borg El Arab Stadium, Alexandria
Attendance: 15,000
Referee: Ibrahim Nour El Din

== Bracket ==
The following is the bracket which the Egyptian League Cup resembles (excluding the preliminary round). Numbers in parentheses next to the match score represent the results of a penalty shoot-out.

Round of 16; 19–26 March 2023
Al Ahly	—
Al Masry (w/o)	—
Ghazl El Mahalla	1 (6)
Ismaily (p)	1 (7)
Al Mokawloon Al Arab	0 (5)
Haras El Hodoud (p)	0 (6)
Future (p)	0 (3)
Tala'ea El Gaish	0 (1)
Zamalek	0
National Bank of Egypt	3
Ceramica Cleopatra (p)	1 (5)
Smouha	1 (3)
Al Ittihad (p)	2 (7)
Pharco	2 (6)
Pyramids	1 (5)
ENPPI (p)	1 (6)

Quarter-finals; 28–30 April 2023
Al Masry	2
Ismaily	0
Haras El Hodoud	0
Future	1
National Bank of Egypt	2 (3)
Ceramica Cleopatra (p)	2 (4)
Al Ittihad	3
ENPPI	2

Semi-finals; 24–26 June 2023
Al Masry (p)	0 (3)
Future	0 (1)
Ceramica Cleopatra (p)	0 (4)
Al Ittihad	0 (3)

Final; 22 July 2023
Al Masry	1
Ceramica Cleopatra	4

== Top scorers ==
Rank	Player	Club	Goals
1	(Egypt) Ahmed Adel	Al Ittihad	2
1	(Egypt) Karim Bambo	National Bank of Egypt	2
1	(Egypt) Mohamed Ibrahim	Ceramica Cleopatra	2
1	(Egypt) Salah Mohsen	Ceramica Cleopatra	2
5	22 players		1
