= New Al Masry SC stadium =

Football stadium in Port Said, Egypt

New Al Masry Club Stadium
- Interactive map of New Al Masry Club Stadium
- Address: Port Said; Egypt
- Coordinates: 31.2716°N 32.2912°E
- Capacity: 12,000

Construction
- Groundbreaking: October 2022
- Built: 2022–2025
- Builder: Nile Valley Contracting Company

Tenant
- Al Masry SC

The New Al Masry SC stadium is set to be built in Port Said, Egypt, with an anticipated opening in late 2025. The state provided financial support for its construction. It is designed to accommodate 12,000 spectators and will meet FIFA and CAF regulations. Construction is taking place on the site of the former stadium, which started being demolished in August 2021. Recently, Al Masry has played their home games at various venues, predominantly at Borg El Arab Stadium in Alexandria.
