= Amreya =

Amreya العامرية
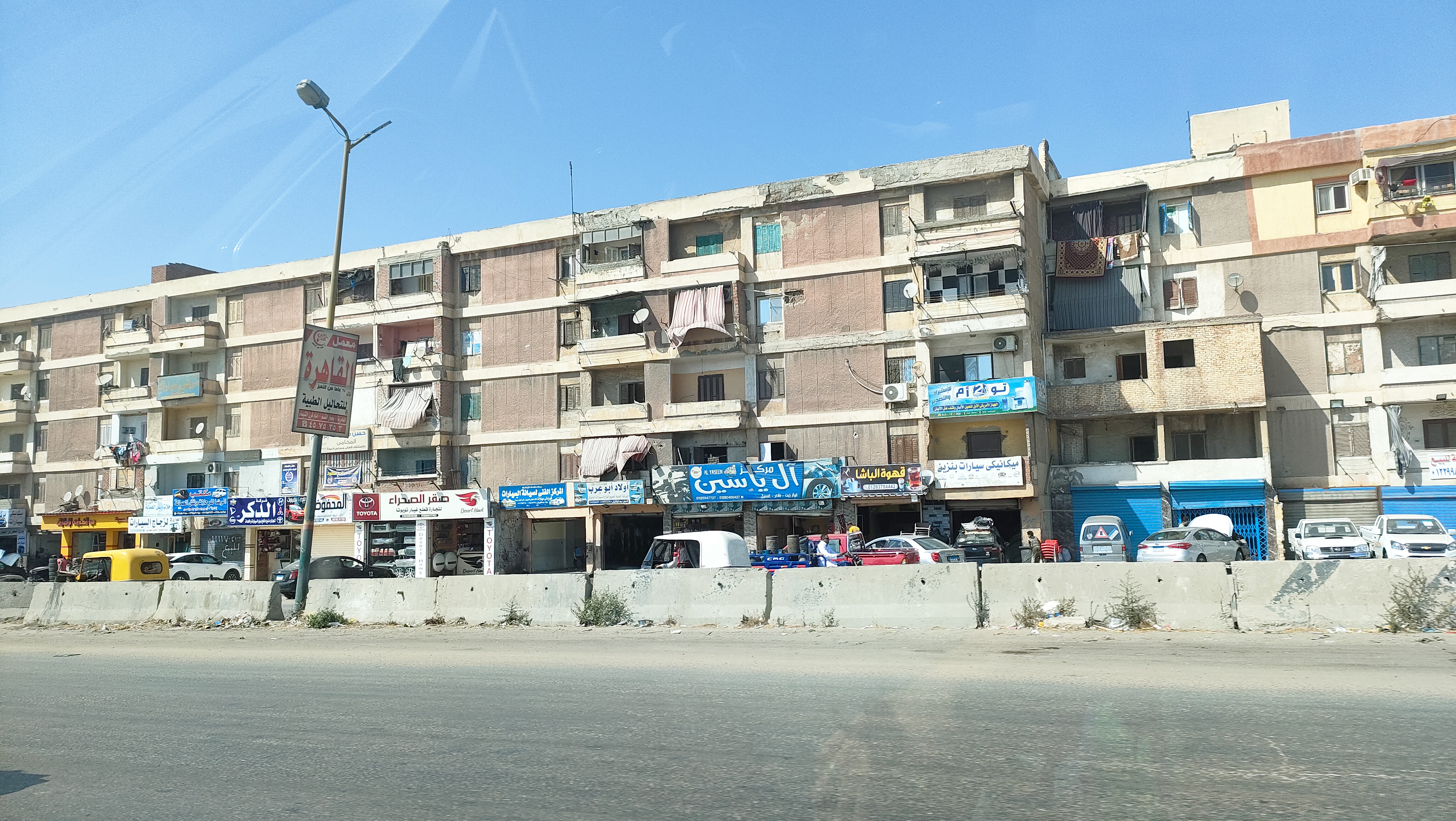

- Location in Egypt
- Coordinates: 31.104538°N 29.766226°E
- Country: Egypt
- Governorate: Alexandria
- City: Amreya
- Time zone: UTC+2 (EET)
  - Summer (DST): UTC+3 (EEST)

Amreya (Arabic: العامرية) is a city in Alexandria Governorate, Egypt.

== Geography ==
Amreya is situated approximately latitude 30° 50' 56" North, longitude 29° 36' 42" East. It is bordered by the Mediterranean Sea to the north, which has influenced the city's historical involvement in maritime trade. The city is located approx. 200 kms west of the Egyptian capital, Cairo and 20 kms from Alexandria downtown.

== Economy ==
Amreya's economy is predominantly industrial, with a focus on manufacturing and production. The city is home to several industrial zones and factories that produce a wide range of goods, including textiles, chemicals, plastics, and food products.

== Landmarks ==
Amreya is home to the Borg El Arab Stadium, the ninth largest association football stadium in the world, seating 86,000.
