= Islam Salah =

Egyptian footballer (born 1991)

Personal information
- Full name: Islam Salah Salem Mohamed Abdo Sobh
- Date of birth: 1 July 1991 (age 35) or 7 January 1991 (age 35)
- Place of birth: Egypt
- Height: 1.77 m (5 ft 10 in)
- Position: Centre-back

Team information
- Current team: Aswan
- Number: 30

Senior career*
Years	Team	Apps	(Gls)
2009–11	Al Masry	0	(0)
2012–2013	→ El Gouna FC (loan)	2	(0)
2016-22	Al-Masry SC	25	(6)
2022-	Aswan SC	19	(1)
- * Club domestic league appearances and goals as of 22 August 2025 @ 13:13(AEST)

Islam Salah (Egyptian Arabic: إسلام صلاح, born 1 July 1991 or 7 January 1991) is an Egyptian footballer who plays for Egyptian Premier League club Aswan SC as a centre-back.
