= Ahmed Gamal (footballer) =

Egyptian footballer (born 1994)

Personal information
- Full name: Ahmed Gamal Kamel
- Date of birth: 3 January 1994 (age 32)
- Place of birth: Gharbia, Egypt
- Position: Left back

Team information
- Current team: Smouha
- Number: 20

Senior career*
Years	Team	Apps	(Gls)
–2019	Nogoom FC		
2017–2018	→ Alassiouty Sport (loan)	21	(0)
2019	El Makkasa	2	(0)
2019–	Smouha	17	(0)
- * Club domestic league appearances and goals as of 22:35, 17 December 2019 (UTC)

Ahmed Gamal (Arabic: أحمد جمال; born 3 January 1994) is an Egyptian professional footballer who currently plays as a defensive midfielder for Egyptian Premier League club Smouha.
