= Ahmad Abdelhay =

Qatari footballer (born 1997)

Ahmad Abdelhay أحمد عبد الحي
Personal information
- Full name: Ahmad Abdelhay Eissa
- Date of birth: 20 March 1997 (age 29)
- Place of birth: Qatar
- Position: Right back

Team information
- Current team: Al-Waab
- Number: 15

Youth career
- Al-Kharaitiyat

Senior career*
Years	Team	Apps	(Gls)
2017–2022	Al-Kharaitiyat	19	(0)
2022–2023	Smouha		
2023–2025	Al-Kharaitiyat		
2025–2026	Al-Khor		
2026–	Al-Waab		
- * Club domestic league appearances and goals

Ahmad Abdelhay Eissa (Arabic:أحمد عبد الحي عيسى) (born 20 March 1997) is a Qatari footballer who currently plays for Al-Waab as a right back.

== Career ==
Ahmad Abdelhay started his career at Al-Kharaitiyat and is a product of the Al-Kharaitiyat's youth system. On 15 September 2017, Ahmad Abdelhay made his professional debut for Al-Kharaitiyat against Umm Salal in the Pro League .
