= Ali Fathy =

Egyptian footballer (born 1992)

Personal information
- Full name: Ali Fathy Omar Ali
- Date of birth: 2 January 1992 (age 34)
- Place of birth: Cairo, Egypt
- Height: 1.83 m (6 ft 0 in)
- Position: Left back

Team information
- Current team: Zamalek SC
- Number: 27

Youth career
- 2009–2010: Al-Mokawloon Al-Arab

Senior career*
Years	Team	Apps	(Gls)
2010–2014	Al-Mokawloon Al-Arab	56	(4)
2014–2016	→ Nacional (loan)	1	(0)
2016–	Zamalek SC	1	(0)

International career^{‡}
2012	Egypt U20	0	(0)
2012–	Egypt	2	(0)
- * Club domestic league appearances and goals as of 15 September 2014 ‡ National team caps and goals as of 21 August 2014

Ali Fathy Omar Ali (born 2 January 1992) is an Egyptian professional footballer who plays for Egyptian Premier League club Aswan SC. He plays for Egypt national football team and has also competed at the 2012 Summer Olympics.
