= Emeka Christian Eze =

Nigerian footballer (born 1992)

Emeka Eze
Personal information
- Full name: Emeka Christian Eze
- Date of birth: 22 December 1992 (age 33)
- Place of birth: Ibadan, Nigeria
- Height: 1.80 m (5 ft 11 in)
- Position: Midfielder

Youth career
- 2006–2010: FC Inter Enugu (Futsal)

Senior career*
Years	Team	Apps	(Gls)
2010–2016	Enugu Rangers		
2016–2018	Al Nasr Lel Taa'den	15	(1)
2017–2018	El Entag El Harby SC (loan)	30	(0)
2018–2024	Al Masry SC	122	(2)

International career^{‡}
2013–	Nigeria	5	(0)
- * Club domestic league appearances and goals as of 25 August 2024 ‡ National team caps and goals as of 25 April 2014

Emeka Christian Eze (born 22 December 1992) is a Nigerian professional footballer who plays as a defensive midfielder.

== Club career ==
Eze started his career at Inter Enugu, a futsal side, where he played for three years before switching to association football, where he was signed for Enugu Rangers.

== International career ==
Eze had his international debut in a friendly match against Mexico on 31 May 2013. He was selected for Nigeria's squad at the 2013 FIFA Confederations Cup.
