= Islam Gaber =

Egyptian footballer (born 1996)

Personal information
- Date of birth: 1 May 1996 (age 30)
- Place of birth: Egypt
- Position: Winger

Youth career
- 2008–2015: Eastern Company

Senior career*
Years	Team	Apps	(Gls)
2015–2017	Eastern Company		
2017–2019	Misr Lel Makkasa	6	(0)
2018–2019	→ El Dakhleya (loan)	25	(3)
2019–2022	Zamalek	64	(0)

International career^{‡}
2019	Egypt	1	(0)
- * Club domestic league appearances and goals as of 22:44, 14 July 2022 (UTC) ‡ National team caps and goals as of 26 March 2019

Islam Gaber (Arabic: إسلام جابر; born 1 May 1996) is an Egyptian professional footballer who plays as a midfielder.

== International ==
He made his debut for the Egypt national football team on 26 March 2019 in a friendly against Nigeria.

== Honours ==
Zamalek

- Egyptian Premier League 2020-21, 2021-22
- Egypt Cup: 2018–19, 2021
- Egyptian Super Cup: 2019–20
- CAF Super Cup: 2020
