= Abdel Rahman Ramadan =

Egyptian footballer (born 1993)

Abdelrahman Ramadan
Personal information
- Full name: Abdelrahman Ramadan Moussa
- Date of birth: June 6, 1993 (age 33)
- Position: Second striker

Team information
- Current team: Wadi Degla
- Number: 7

Youth career
- –2014: JMG Academy Cairo
- 2014–2015: Wadi Degla

Senior career*
Years	Team	Apps	(Gls)
2015–2017	Wadi Degla	11	(0)
2016–2017	→El Dakhleya (loan)	16	(1)
2017–2019	El-Entag El-Harby	17	(0)
2019–	Wadi Degla	13	(0)
- * Club domestic league appearances and goals as of 10 October 2017

Abdelrahman Ramadan (Arabic: عبد الرحمن رمضان; born June 6, 1993) is an Egyptian professional footballer who currently plays as a second striker for Ceramica Cleopatra FC.
