= Mohamed Hamdy Zaky =

Egyptian footballer (born 1991)

Mohamed Hamdy
Personal information
- Full name: Mohamed Hamdy Zaky
- Date of birth: December 13, 1991 (age 34)
- Place of birth: Alexandria, Egypt
- Height: 1.83 m (6 ft 0 in)
- Position: Striker

Youth career
- 2009–2012: Ittihad

Senior career*
Years	Team	Apps	(Gls)
2010–2015	Ittihad	70	(14)
2015–2017	Al Ahly	0	(0)
2016–2016	→ Smouha SC (Loan)	15	(5)
2017–2017	→ ENPPI (loan)	9	(2)
2017–2019	Smouha	23	(8)
2019–2020	Ismaily	20	(0)
2020–2022	Al Mokawloon Al Arab	44	(6)
2022–2024	Aswan	28	(12)
2023–2024	→ Tala'ea El Gaish (loan)	13	(2)
2024–2025	Ghazl El Mahalla	20	(1)

International career
2010–2011	Egypt U20	11	(3)
2015	Egypt	1	(0)
- * Club domestic league appearances and goals as of 23 August 2025

Mohamed Hamdy Zaky (Arabic: محمد حمدي زكي), known simply as Mohamed Hamdy (born 13 December 1991) is an Egyptian professional footballer who plays as a striker.

Hamdy played with Egypt U20 in 2011 FIFA U-20 World Cup.

Hamdy made his debut with Egypt national football team on June 8, 2015, against Malawi.

== Career statistics ==
As of 11 July 2016

Club	Season	League		Cup		Continental		Total	
Club	Season	Apps	Goals	Apps	Goals	Apps	Goals	Apps	Goals
Ittihad	2014–15	33	13	0	0	0	0	33	13
Smouha	2015–16	15	5	0	0	0	0	15	5
