= Seif Teka =

Tunisian footballer

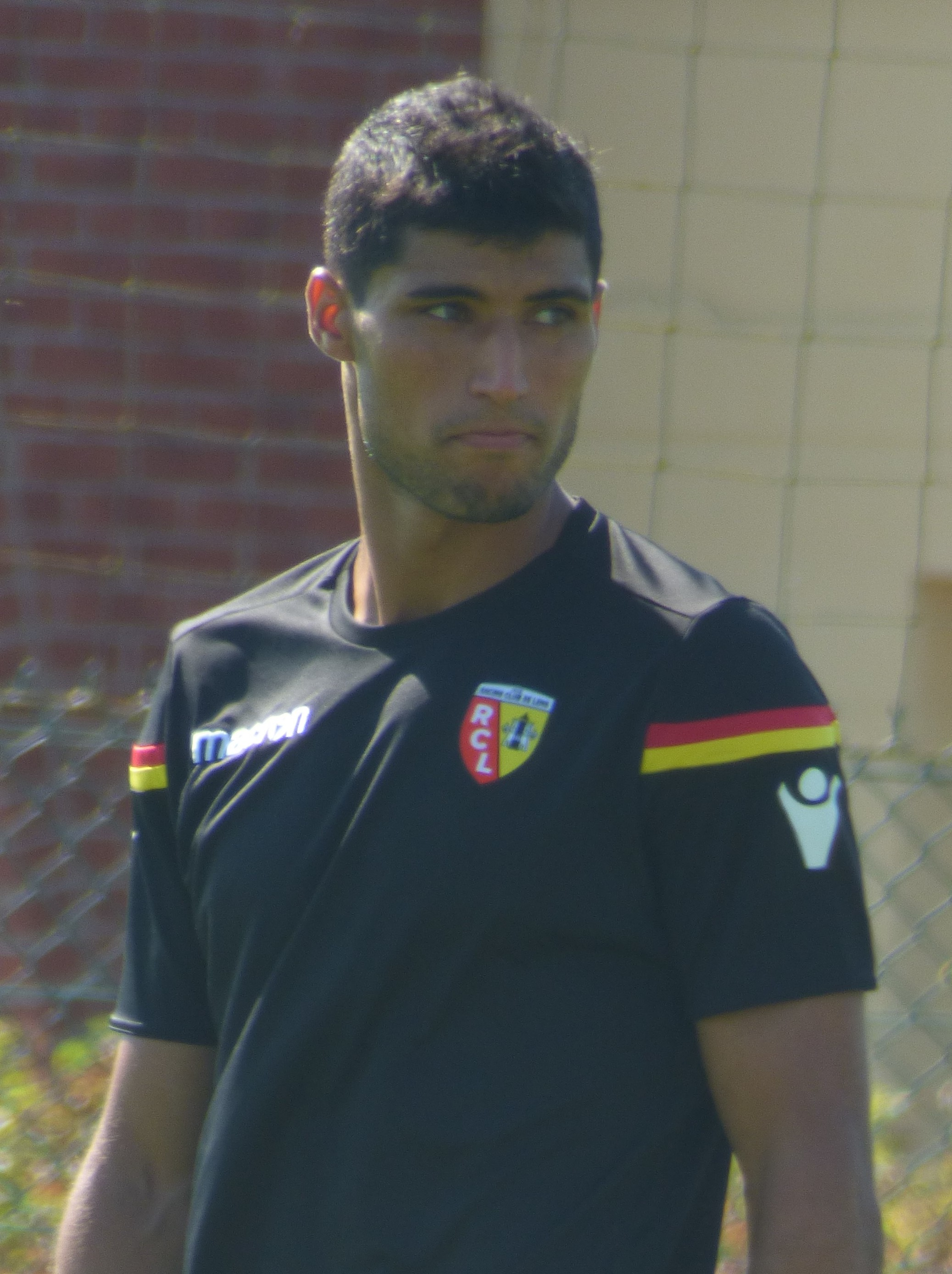
- Teka training with Lens in 2018

Personal information
- Date of birth: 20 April 1991 (age 35)
- Place of birth: Monastir, Tunisia
- Height: 1.87 m (6 ft 2 in)
- Position: Defender

Team information
- Current team: Ceramica Cleopatra FC
- Number: 28

Youth career
- 1999–2006: Stade Tunisien
- 2006–2007: Club Africain
- 2007–2008: CS Sfaxien
- 2008–2011: Monastir

Senior career*
Years	Team	Apps	(Gls)
2011–2012	Monastir	19	(1)
2012–2018	Club Africain	113	(1)
2018–2019	Lens	11	(1)
2018–2019	Lens II	4	(1)
2020	CS Chebba	9	(0)
2020–	Ceramica Cleopatra FC	42	(4)
- * Club domestic league appearances and goals as of 1 July 2022

Seif Teka (born 20 April 1991), alternatively spelled Saïf Tka, is a Tunisian professional footballer who plays as a defender for Egyptian Premier League club Ceramica Cleopatra FC.

== Career ==
After seven seasons with Club Africain, Teka signed with Ligue 2 club RC Lens on 28 July 2018. He made his professional debut with Lens in a 1–0 Coupe de la Ligue win over Tours FC on 14 August 2018.

== Honours ==
Club Africain

- Tunisian Ligue Professionnelle 1: 2014–2015
- Tunisian Cup: 2016–17, 2017–18
