= Mohamed Antar =

Egyptian footballer (born 1993)

Personal information
- Date of birth: 10 February 1993 (age 33)
- Place of birth: Abu Tig, Asyut Governorate, Egypt
- Position: Winger

Team information
- Current team: Zamalek
- Number: 8

Youth career
- Markaz Shabab Abu Tig

Senior career*
Years	Team	Apps	(Gls)
2017–2018	Alassiouty Sport	19	(4)
2018–	Zamalek	30	(3)
- * Club domestic league appearances and goals

Mohamed Antar (Arabic: محمد عنتر; born 10 February 1993) is an Egyptian professional footballer who plays as a winger for Egyptian Premier League club Zamalek.

== Honours ==
Zamalek

- Egypt Cup: 2017–18, 2018–19
- Egyptian Super Cup: 2019–20
- Saudi-Egyptian Super Cup: 2018
- CAF Confederation Cup: 2018–19
- CAF Super Cup: 2020
