= Ahmed Ramadan (footballer) =

Egyptian footballer (born 1997)

Ahmed Ramadan أَحْمَد رَمَضَان
Personal information
- Full name: Ahmed Ramadan Abdou Mohamed
- Date of birth: 23 March 1997 (age 29)
- Place of birth: Egypt
- Height: 1.86 m (6 ft 1 in)
- Position: Right-back

Team information
- Current team: Al Ahly (loan) from Ceramica Cleopatra
- Number: 4

Youth career
- Al Ahly

Senior career*
Years	Team	Apps	(Gls)
2014–2018	Al Ahly	2	(0)
2015–2016	→ Haras El Hodoud (loan)	21	(1)
2018–2019	→ Wadi Degla (loan)	11	(0)
2019–2020	Wadi Degla	43	(2)
2020–2022	Al Ahly	11	(0)
2021–2022	→ Smouha (loan)	27	(1)
2022–	Ceramica Cleopatra	90	(3)
2025–	→Al Ahly (loan)	0	(0)

International career
2015–2019	Egypt U20	7	(1)
2018–2021	Egypt U23		
- * Club domestic league appearances and goals

Ahmed Ramadan Abdou Mohamed (Arabic: أَحْمَد رَمَضَان عَبْدُه مُحَمَّد; born 23 March 1997), nicknamed Beckham after the legendary English former footballer David Beckham, is an Egyptian football player who is currently playing for Ceramica Cleopatra. He is product of Al Ahly youth academy.

== Career statistics ==
Last updated on August 31, 2021

=== With clubs ===
team	season	League		the cup		Continental tournaments		Other tournaments		Total	
team	season	APP	Goals	APP	Goals	APP	Goals	APP	Goals	APP	Goals
Al Ahly	2014–2015	0	0	1	0	0	0	0	0	1	0
Al Ahly	Total	0	0	1	0	0	0	0	0	1	0
Haras El Hodoud (loan)	2015–2016	21	1	1	0	—				22	1
Haras El Hodoud (loan)	Total	21	1	1	0	—				22	1
Al Ahly	2016–2017	1	0	0	0	0	0	0	0	1	0
Al Ahly	2017–2018	1	0	0	0	0	0	0	0	1	0
Al Ahly	Total	2	0	0	0	0	0	0	0	2	0
Wadi Degla	2018–2019	24	0	2	0	—				26	0
Wadi Degla	2019–2020	30	2	2	0	—				32	2
Wadi Degla	Total	54	2	4	0	—				58	2
Al Ahly	2020–2021	11	0	1	0	5	0	0	0	17	0
Al Ahly	Total	11	0	1	0	5	0	0	0	17	0
Smouha (loan)	2021–2022	25	1	0	0	—				25	1
Smouha (loan)	Total	25	1	0	0	—				25	1
Ceramica Cleopatra	2022–2023	0	0	0	0	—				0	0
Ceramica Cleopatra	Total	0	0	0	0	—				0	0

== Honours ==
=== Al Ahly ===
- Egyptian Premier League: 2016–17, 2017–18
- FIFA Club World Cup: Third-Place 2020 FIFA Club World Cup
- CAF Champions League: 2020-21

=== Egypt ===
- Africa U-23 Cup of Nations Champions: 2019
