= Mohamed Shokry =

Egyptian footballer (born 1999)

Personal information
- Full name: Mohamed Shokry Gaber Khalil
- Date of birth: 6 July 1999 (age 27)
- Place of birth: Sharqia, Egypt
- Height: 1.70 m (5 ft 7 in)
- Position: Left-back

Team information
- Current team: Al Masry SC

Youth career
- 2007–2020: Al Ahly

Senior career*
Years	Team	Apps	(Gls)
2020–2022	Al Ahly	1	(0)
2021–2022	→ Smouha (loan)	22	(1)
2022–2025	Ceramica Cleopatra	46	(3)
2025–2026	Al Ahly	15	(0)
2026-	Al Masry SC	0	(0)

International career^{‡}
2024–	Egypt	1	(0)
- * Club domestic league appearances and goals as of 1st August 2026 ‡ National team caps and goals as of 15 May 2025

Mohamed Shokry Gaber Khalil (Arabic: محمد شكري جابر خليل; born 6 July 1999) is an Egyptian professional footballer who plays as a left-back for Al Masry SC and the Egypt national team.

== Club career ==
Born in the Sharqia Governorate of Egypt, Shokry began his career in the Al Ahly academy in 2007. He was invited to first team training by then-manager René Weiler in July 2020. Having featured in a friendly match against Smouha, he signed his first professional contract with the club in the same month. He made his debut for Al Ahly in their 2–1 Egypt Cup win against Tersana on 30 September 2020.

In November 2020, he was linked with a loan move to the National Bank of Egypt, but this move never came to fruition, and in January 2021, Shokry was sent on a season-and-a-half loan deal to Smouha. At the conclusion of the loan deal in September 2022, he thanked the club via his personal Facebook page, signalling that he did not intend to continue with another loan deal, as Smouha had hoped. Al Ahly had already stated in March of the same year that they intended for Shokry to return to the club in order to be integrated into the first team.

Despite this, Shokry and Al Ahly teammate Ahmed Ramadan signed for Ceramica Cleopatra on 14 September 2022 on a three-year deal. He scored his first goal for the club on 15 December 2022 in Ceramica's 3–2 Egyptian Premier League win against Aswan, also earning the Man-of-the-Match award. His first two seasons with the club were successful, with Shokry notably scoring a 40-yard free kick in a 4–1 Egyptian League Cup win against Al Masry, and in October 2023 it was reported that Al Ahly were looking to excise their buy-back clause, as well as Shokry attracting interest from Zamalek.

Shokry later confirmed in a TV interview that Zamalek had contacted him, before a Zamalek board member, Ahmed Soliman, dispelled the links, stating that Al Ahly had a 9-million Egyptian pound buy-back clause. After Al Ahly's hesitancy to bring Shokry back to the club, he agreed to join Zamalek, but this deal was cancelled after Ceramica refused to sanction the deal.

Strongly linked with a move to Al Ahly, with head coach Marcel Koller reportedly changing his initially reserved opinion on Shokry's return, he suffered a cruciate ligament tear in April 2024, cancelling the prospect of any deal being completed. He underwent surgery the following month, and returned to individual training in December 2024.

Having returned to first team training in January 2025, he made a handful of appearances towards the end of the season, prompting Al Ahly to reignite their interest in him. Despite looking to sign Shokry before the 2025 FIFA Club World Cup, it was reported by media personality Mohamed El-Leithy that he had signed a new contract with Ceramica, and that a deal was unlikely to go ahead.

== International career ==
Shokry made his debut for the senior Egypt national team on 22 March 2024 in a friendly against New Zealand.

== Career statistics ==
=== Club ===
As of 15 May 2025.

Appearances and goals by club, season and competition
Club	Season	League			National Cup (Note: Includes Egypt Cup)		League Cup (Note: Includes Egyptian League Cup)		Other		Total	
Club	Season	Division	Apps	Goals	Apps	Goals	Apps	Goals	Apps	Goals	Apps	Goals
Al Ahly	2019–20	Egyptian Premier League	0	0	1	0	0	0	0	0	1	0
Al Ahly	2020–21	Egyptian Premier League	1	0	0	0	0	0	0	0	1	0
Al Ahly	2021–22	Egyptian Premier League	0	0	0	0	0	0	0	0	0	0
Al Ahly	Total		1	0	1	0	0	0	0	0	2	0
Smouha (loan)	2020–21	Egyptian Premier League	4	0	1	0	—				5	0
Smouha (loan)	2021–22	Egyptian Premier League	18	1	2	0	2	0	—		22	1
Smouha (loan)	Total		22	1	3	0	2	0	0	0	27	1
Ceramica Cleopatra	2022–23	Egyptian Premier League	30	1	1	0	2	1	—		33	2
Ceramica Cleopatra	2023–24	Egyptian Premier League	16	2	0	0	4	0	2 (Note: Appearances in the Egyptian Super Cup)	0	22	2
Ceramica Cleopatra	2024–25	Egyptian Premier League	4	0	0	0	1	1	—		5	1
Ceramica Cleopatra	Total		50	3	1	0	7	2	2	0	60	5
Career total			73	4	5	0	9	2	2	0	89	6

=== International ===
As of matches played 15 May 2025

National team	Year	Apps	Goals
Egypt	2024	1	0
Total		1	0
