= Ibrahim Nour El Din =

Egyptian football referee

Ibrahim Ali Nour El Din
- Full name: Ibrahim Ali El Said Nour El Din
- Born: 24 March 1979 (age 47); Cairo, Egypt
- Other occupation: Assistant referee

Domestic
Years	League	Role
2011–	Egyptian Premier League	Referee

International
Years	League	Role
2014–	FIFA listed	Referee

Ibrahim Ali ElSaid Nour El Din (Arabic: إبراهيم عـلي السـيد نور الدين; born 24 March 1979) is an Egyptian football referee.

Nour became a FIFA referee in 2014.
