= Borg El Arab Stadium =

Football stadium in Egypt

Coordinates: 30°59′51.44″N 29°43′23.71″E

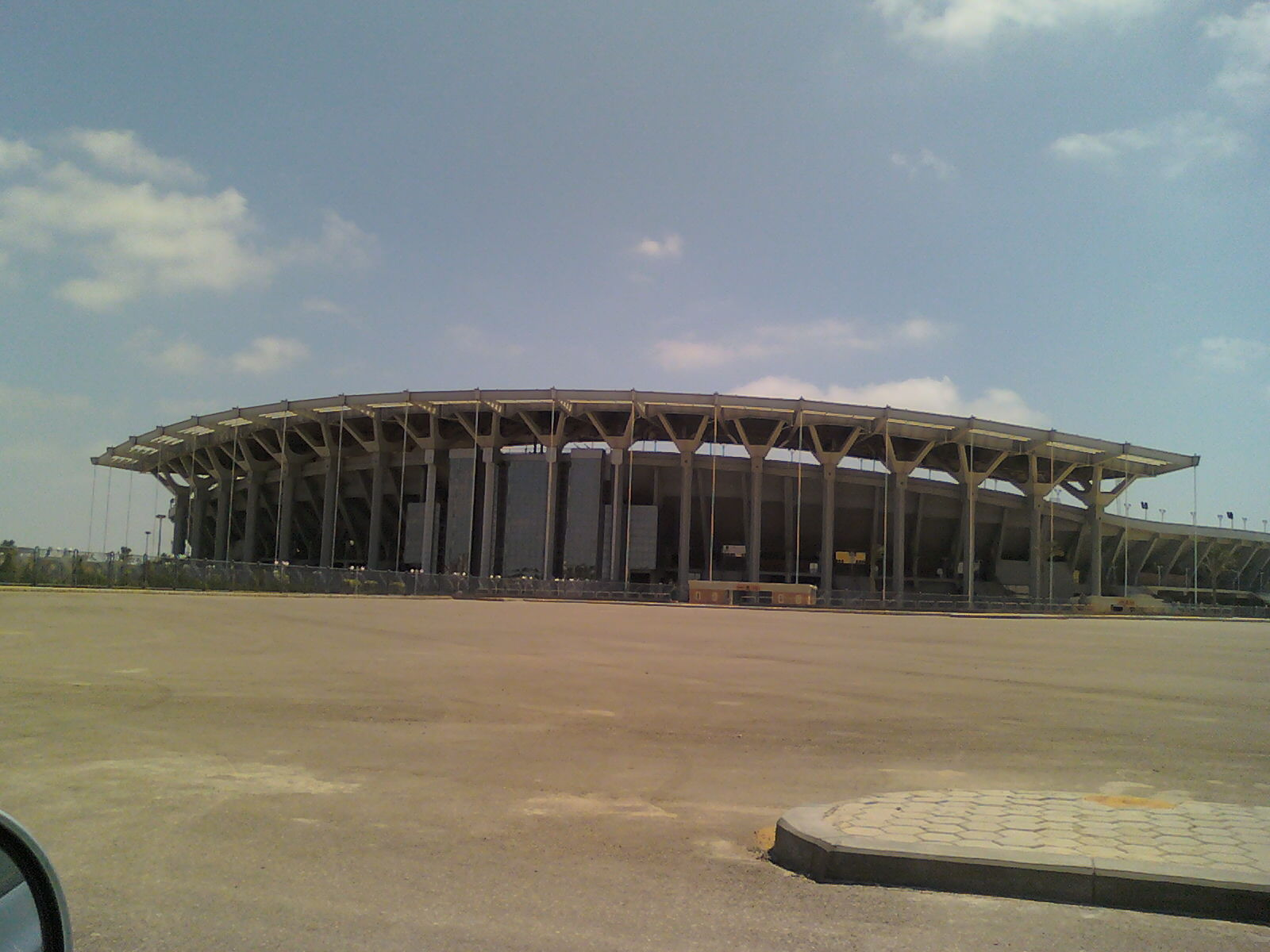
- Interactive map of Borg El Arab Stadium
- Location: Amreya, Alexandria, Egypt
- Capacity: 86,000
- Surface: Grass
- Record attendance: 86,000 (Egypt 2–1 Congo) (8 October 2017)
- Field size: 105 m × 70 m (344 ft × 230 ft)

Construction
- Groundbreaking: 2005
- Opened: 2009
- Architect: Egyptian Armed Forces

Tenants
- Egypt national football team Smouha; Zamalek (selected matches); Al Ahly (selected matches); Al Ittihad (selected matches)

The Borg El Arab Stadium (Egyptian Arabic: ستاد برج العرب), is a stadium commissioned in 2005 in the Mediterranean Sea city of Amreya; 25 km west of Alexandria, Egypt. It is the second largest stadium in Egypt (after Misr Stadium) and the third largest in Africa (after FNB Stadium in Johannesburg) with a capacity of 86,000 and is an all-seater. It is also the 9th largest association football stadium in the world.

The stadium is located on the Cairo-Alexandria desert highway 10 km from Borg El Arab Airport and 15 km from Alexandria's city center. A running track runs around the pitch, and the ground has four floodlights. Only one stand is covered by a roof. The stadium is 145 feddans (609,000 sq m), is surrounded by a fence which is 3 km long, an internal road network measuring 6 km, a parking lot which could fit 5,000 cars and 200 buses. The stadium also has an airstrip. There are 136 electronic entrances. The main cabin is covered by an umbrella which covers 35% of the stadium's total area.

The stadium is air-conditioned. There are 2 sub-stadiums for training and each ground can hold 2,000 spectators, includes 2 locker rooms and a stadium for Athletics. It also includes a hotel for 200 guests. The stadium also includes a building which contains 300 presses.

== History ==
=== Background ===
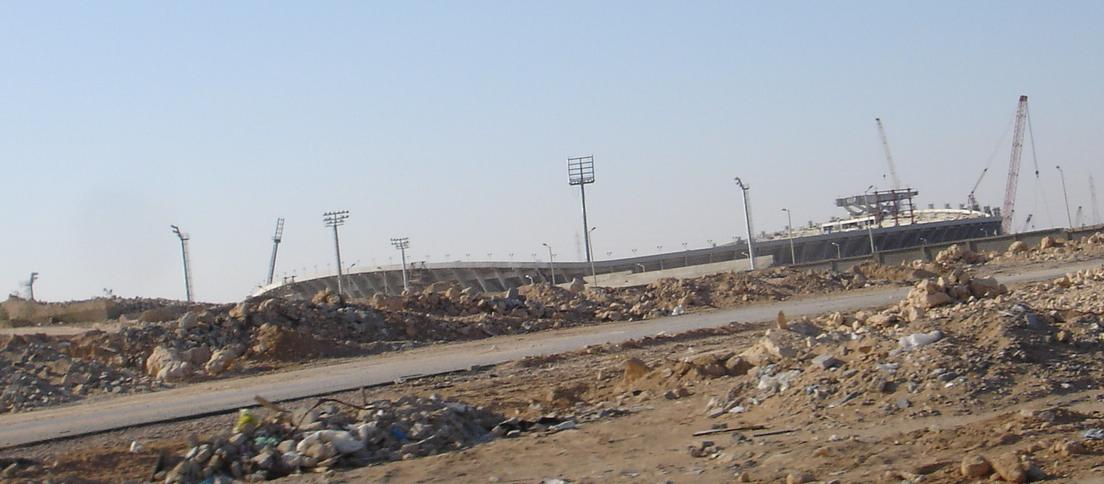
The stadium under construction, circa 14 November 2005.

The Stadium was originally commissioned as part of a 5 international-standard stadiums project for Egypt's bid to host the 2010 FIFA World Cup. After the Egyptian bid to host the World Cup failed, the stadium became the home stadium of the Egyptian national team alongside the Cairo International Stadium. Alongside the national team, Alexandria-based side Smouha started to play their home matches on the stadium instead of Alexandria Stadium since 2016; while Al Ahly, Al Ittihad, Al Masry and Zamalek also played some of their home matches their due to different reasons.

=== Opening ===
To utilize the new stadium, Egypt chose Borg El Arab stadium to be among the stadiums hosting the 2009 FIFA U-20 World Cup. In an inspection tour to check Egypt's readiness, Jack Warner, FIFA Vice-president and head of the inspection delegation, said, "It is a fantastic stadium. It is one of the best in the world". The stadium, however, hosted only one match in that tournament, which was the opening match between Egypt and Trinidad and Tobago as well as the opening ceremony of the competition. FIFA President Sepp Blatter expressed his delight to be at the "fantastic" stadium of Borg El Arab as he watched the visuals and lights show of the opening ceremony.

== Description ==
=== Location ===
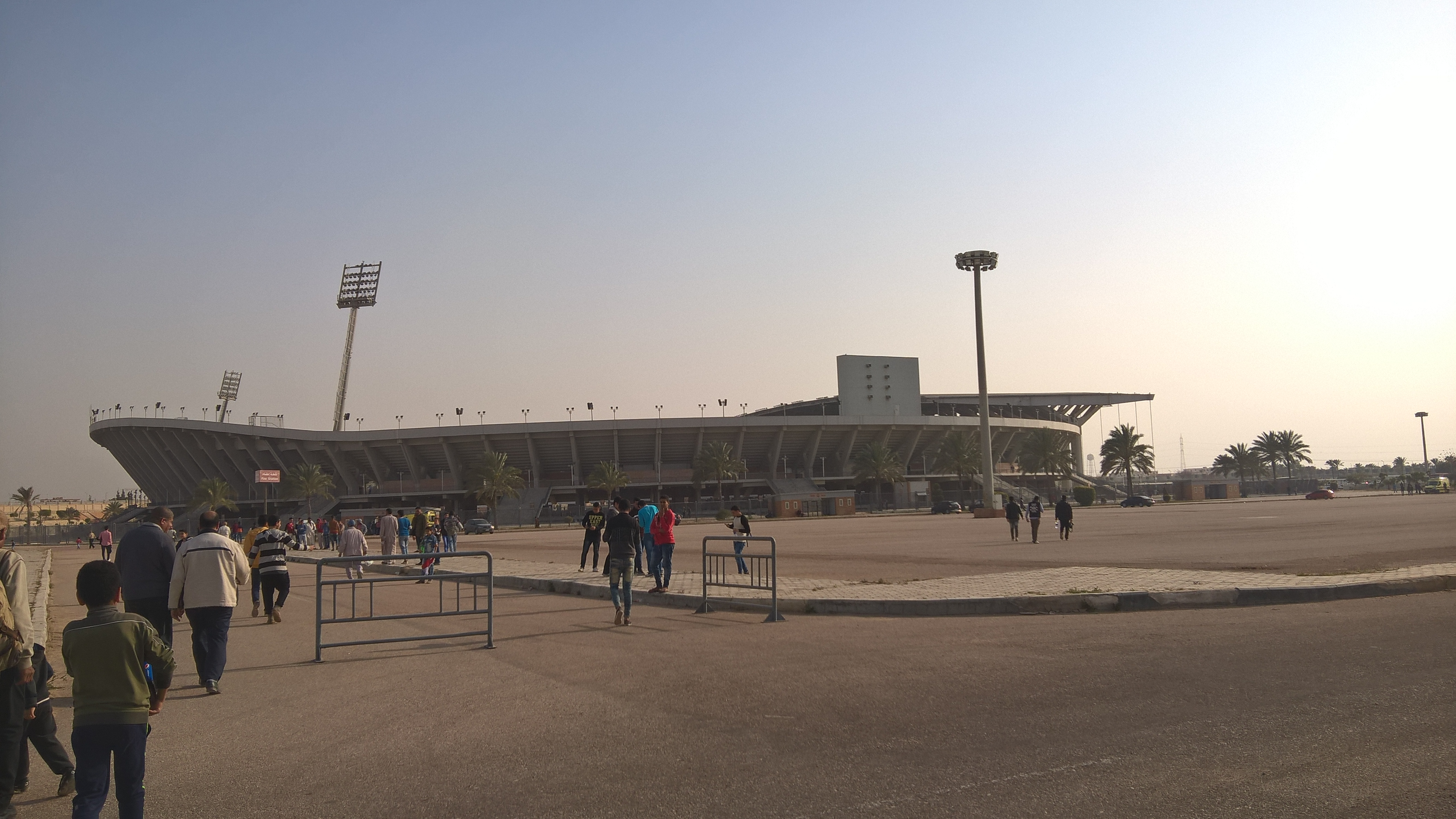
A view of Borg El Arab stadium in 2017

Borg El Arab is located 7 kilometers away from the 31 kilometers mark at the Cairo-Alexandria desert high road. It is also about 10 kilometers away from Borg El Arab Airport. The site is also 1.5 km away from the train station at king Mariot.

The area of land specified for this project is 600,000 m^{2} (145 acres) divided as follow: 30% for facilities, 30% for roads and waiting areas, 40% for green areas. This project is planned to be the building brick for a full Olympic Village integrated.

=== Entrances and exits ===
A 3.5 km long fence surrounds the entire stadium. There are 10 gates and 80 shops with a total surface area of 4 thousand square meters. The main stadium is surrounded by 1.2 km long fence that controls the spectators entrance. This fence contains 17 gates and a total of 136 electronic machine that allow the entry of 800 spectators per minute.

Beyond the gates, there are 76 staircases divided into 22 up to the upper stands, 18 down to the special cabins, 36 down to the lower stands. Other entrances exist for the VIP, handicap, and for people with disabilities. The stadium contains 8 elevators: two elevator for VIP, two for journalists, two for shipments and goods, and other two for people with disabilities.

== Pitch ==
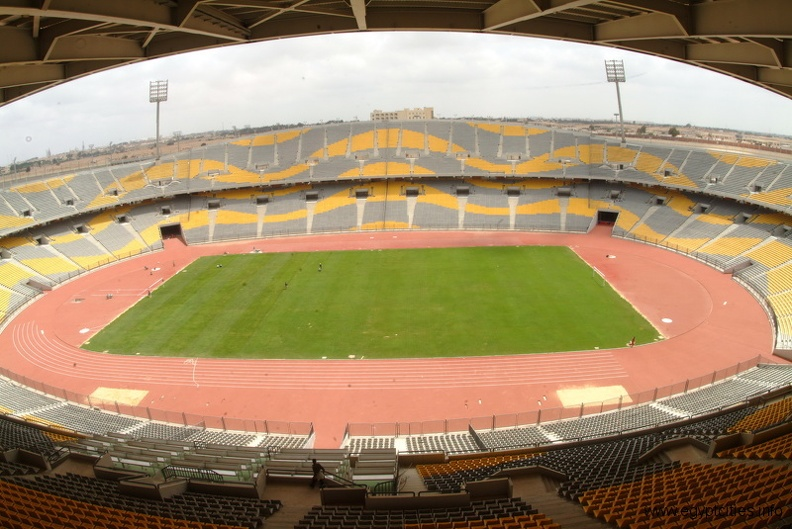
A view of Borg El Arab Stadium

The geographical direction of the pitch is about 12 degrees north west in order to be along the direction of the wind. The reason for that is to avoid any obstruction to the movement of the ball or the players according to the requirements of the International Federation of Football Associations (FIFA). The pitch dimensions is 105 * 70 meters. In addition to the pitch, the stadium is equipped to host Olympic Games activities; 8 running track lanes, water blocker for steeplechase, two sand pit for long jump, one sand pit for triple jump.

The main stadium is equipped with twin light towers positioned at the north-eastern and south-eastern stands of the stadium. In addition, lighting sources are installed along the sunshade. Two results panel and 13 prepared positions for cameras are ready. In addition to the pitch, there are two training fields with a seating capacity of 2000 spectators per field. Both fields occupy a total area of 3,000 m^{2}, where each field includes athletics track. Both training fields are equipped with lighting towers.

== Seating capacity ==
Borg El Arab's main stands can accommodate for 86 thousand spectators on the upper and lower levels. While the exclusive VIP cabin has 22 seats, the terrace can accommodates for 300 spectators. The terrace and first class stand, which represents 35% of the total stadium seating capacity, are covered with a metal sunshade.

== Available services ==
Four rooms for clothes changing, with restrooms and showers included in each, are available for the players. For the spectators, there are 32 restaurants and 68 restrooms (a total of 386 toilets; 337 for men, 43 for women, and 6 for people with disabilities). Twenty five percent of the stadium is air conditioned.

The stadium includes a hotel for the players that includes 200 bed which are air conditioned. The hotel includes a conference hall, a cafeteria, restaurant, swimming pool, a gymnasium and provider of elevators. In addition for the hotel, there is also an administrative building and a housing centre for the stadium's workers. The stadium includes an internal road network that is 6 km long, car parking capacity of 5 thousand cars, and 200 buses and a helicopter landing pad with capacity of 4 aircraft.

== Gallery ==
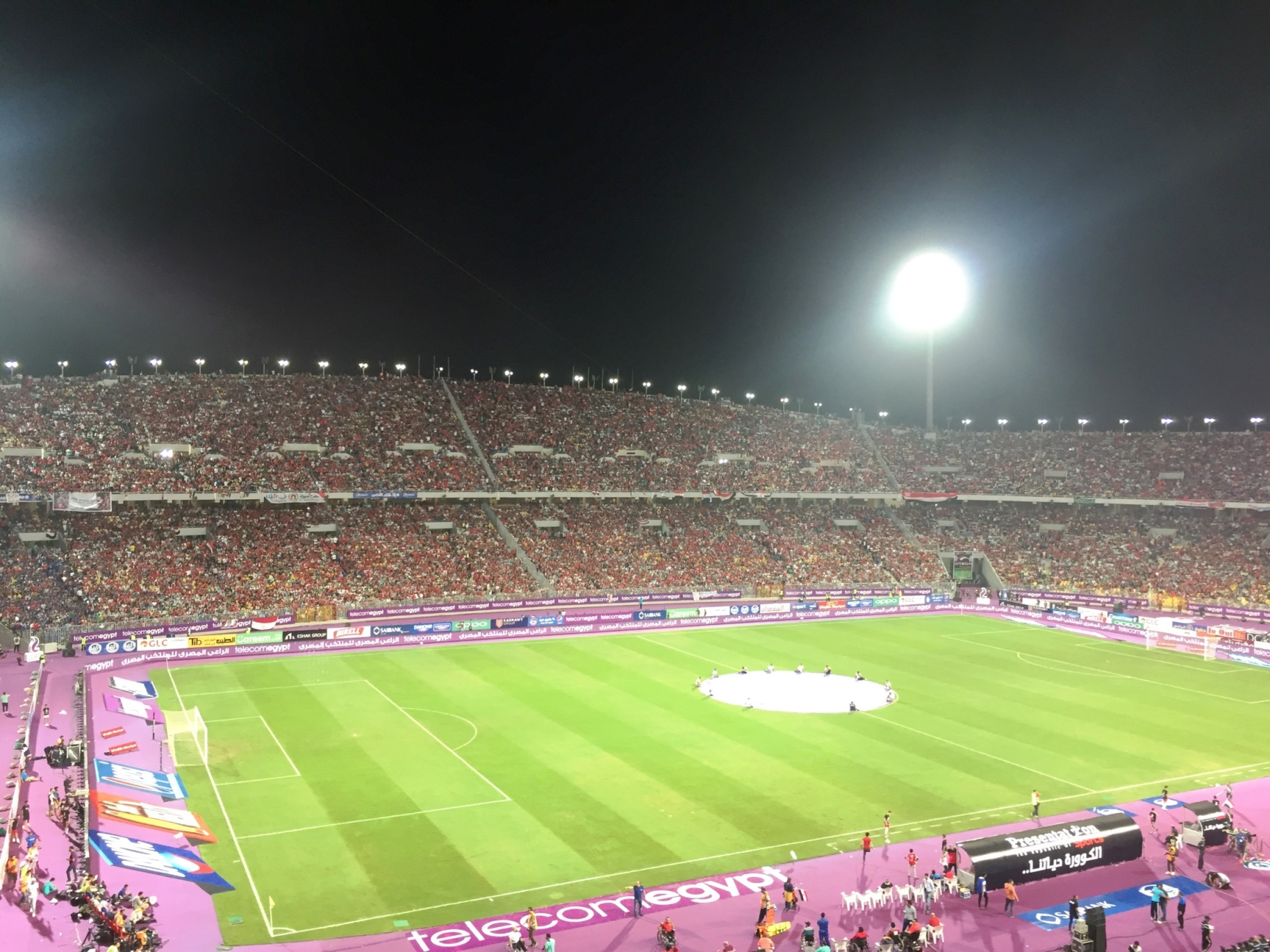
A view of the stadium during a match for the Egypt National Team

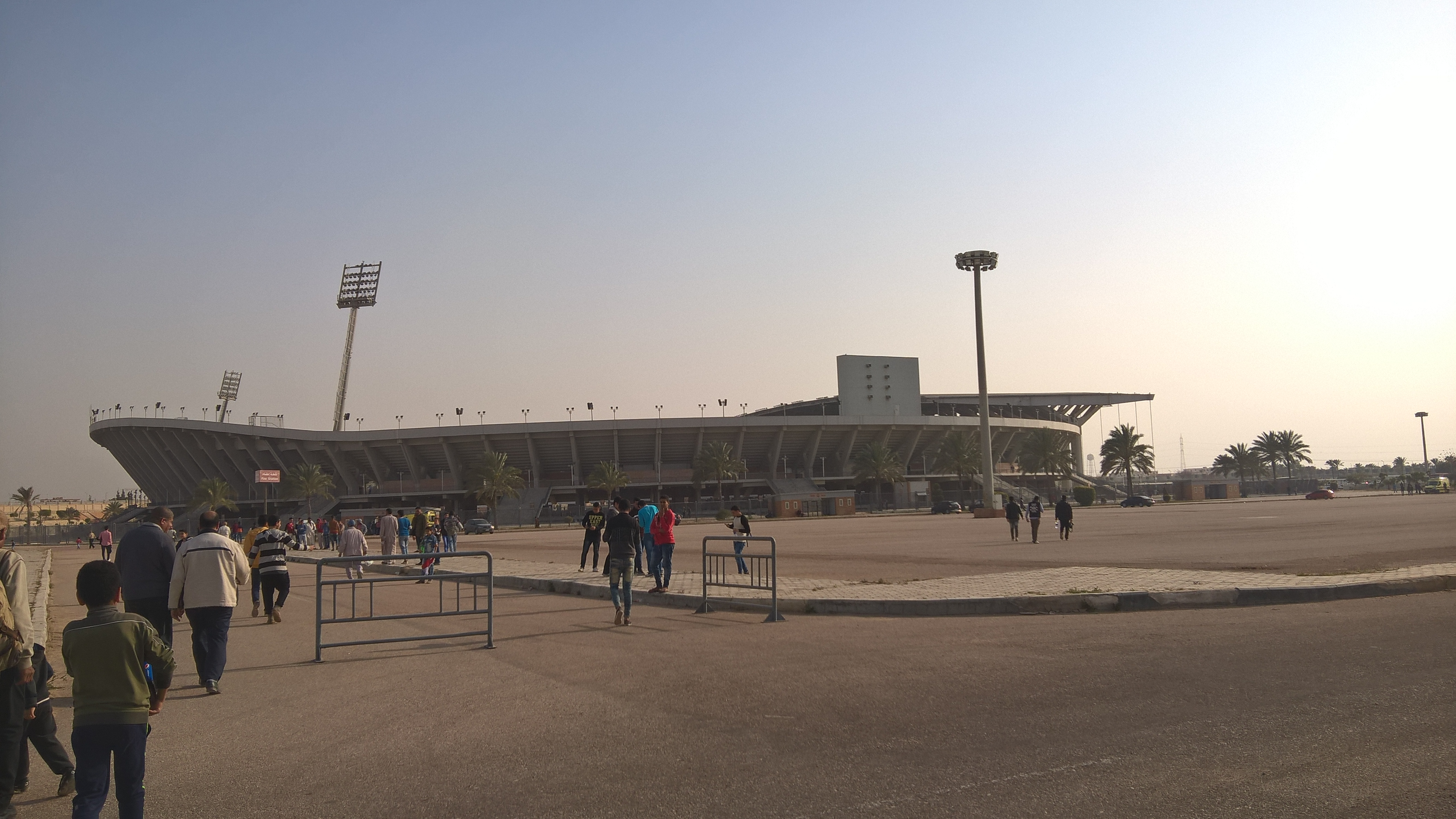
Borg El Arab Stadium before a friendly match in March 2017.

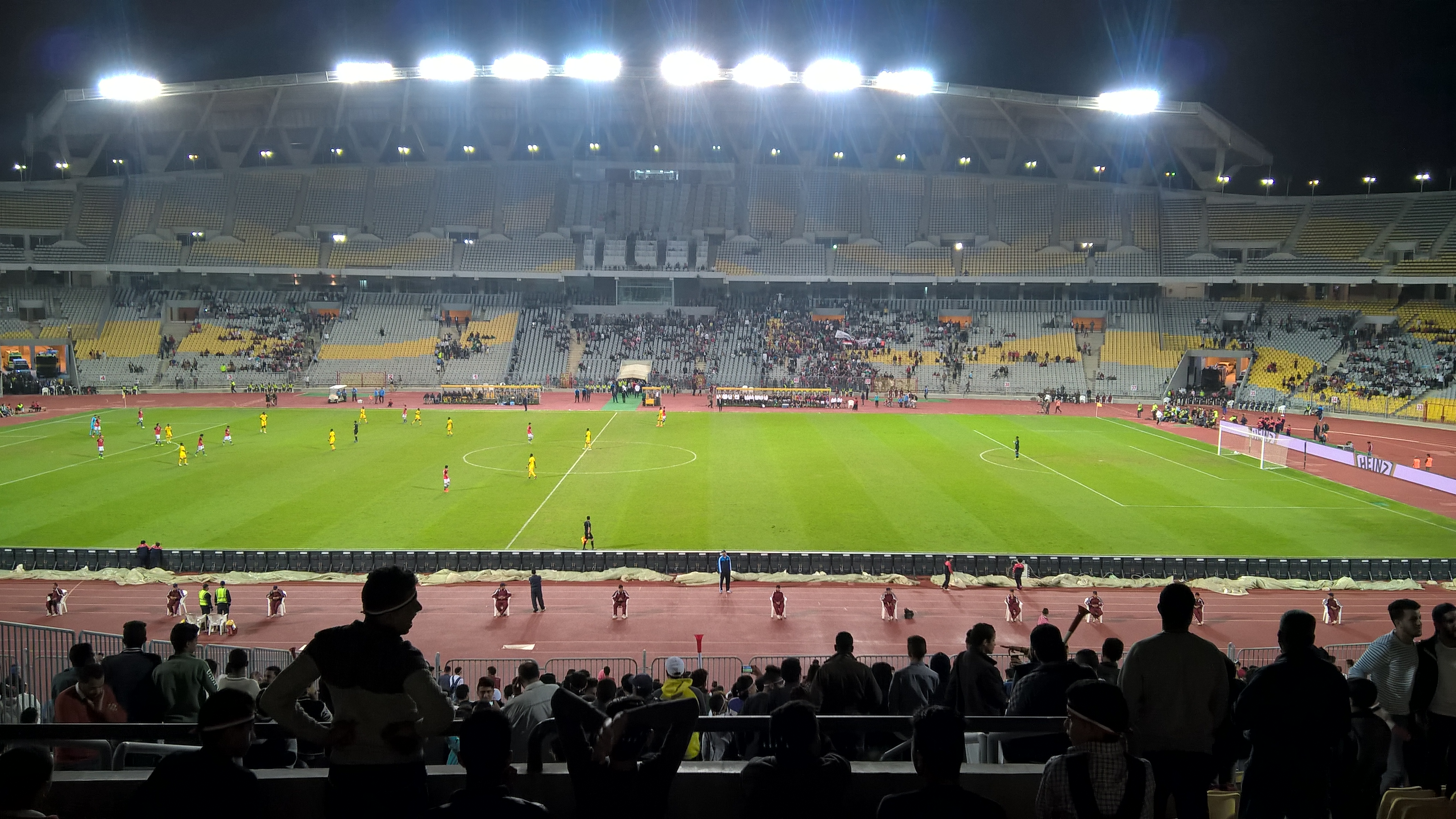
Borg El Arab Stadium during a friendly match in March 2017.

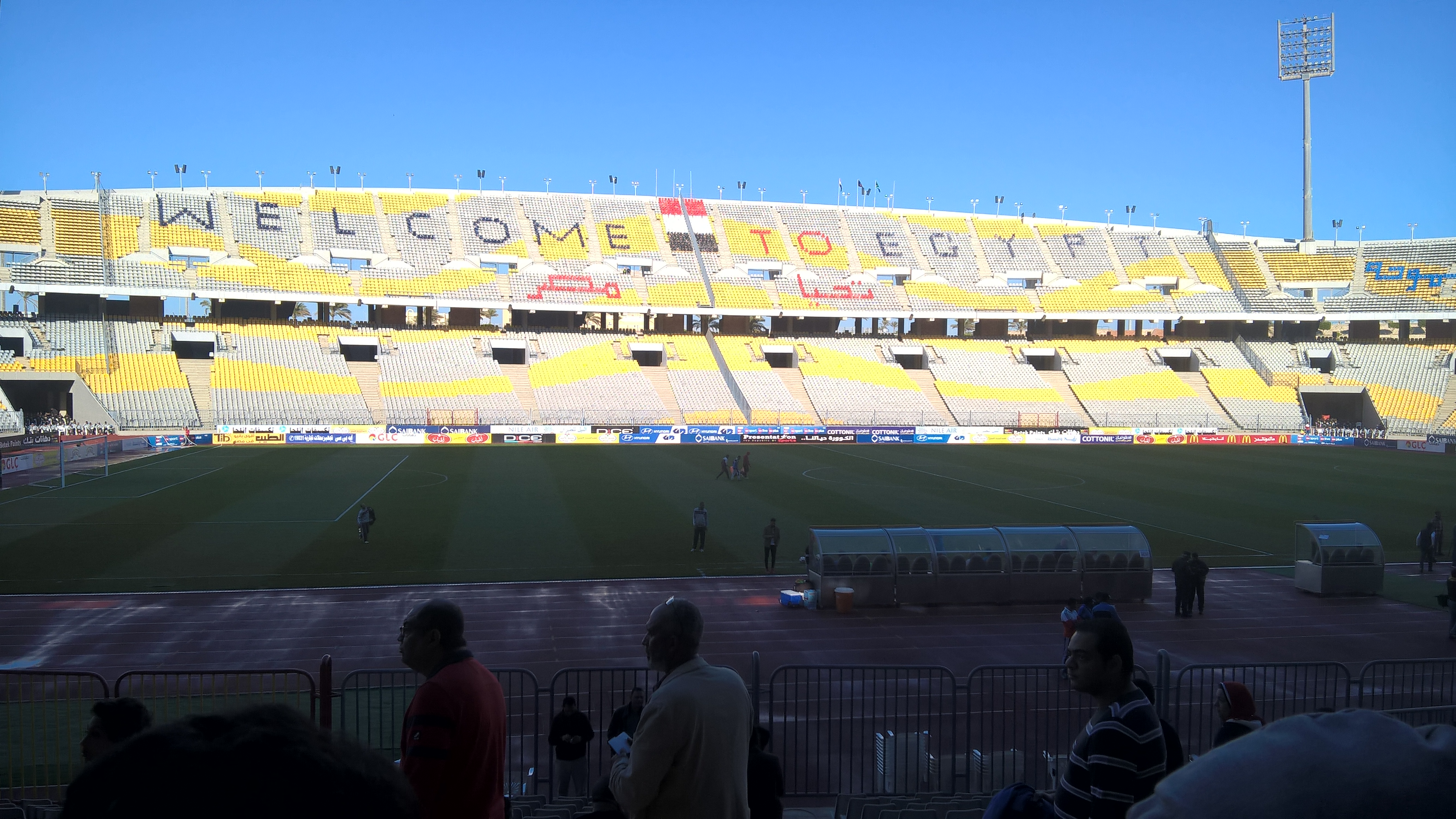
Borg El Arab stadium before a match in the 2017 CAF Confederation Cup in April 2017.

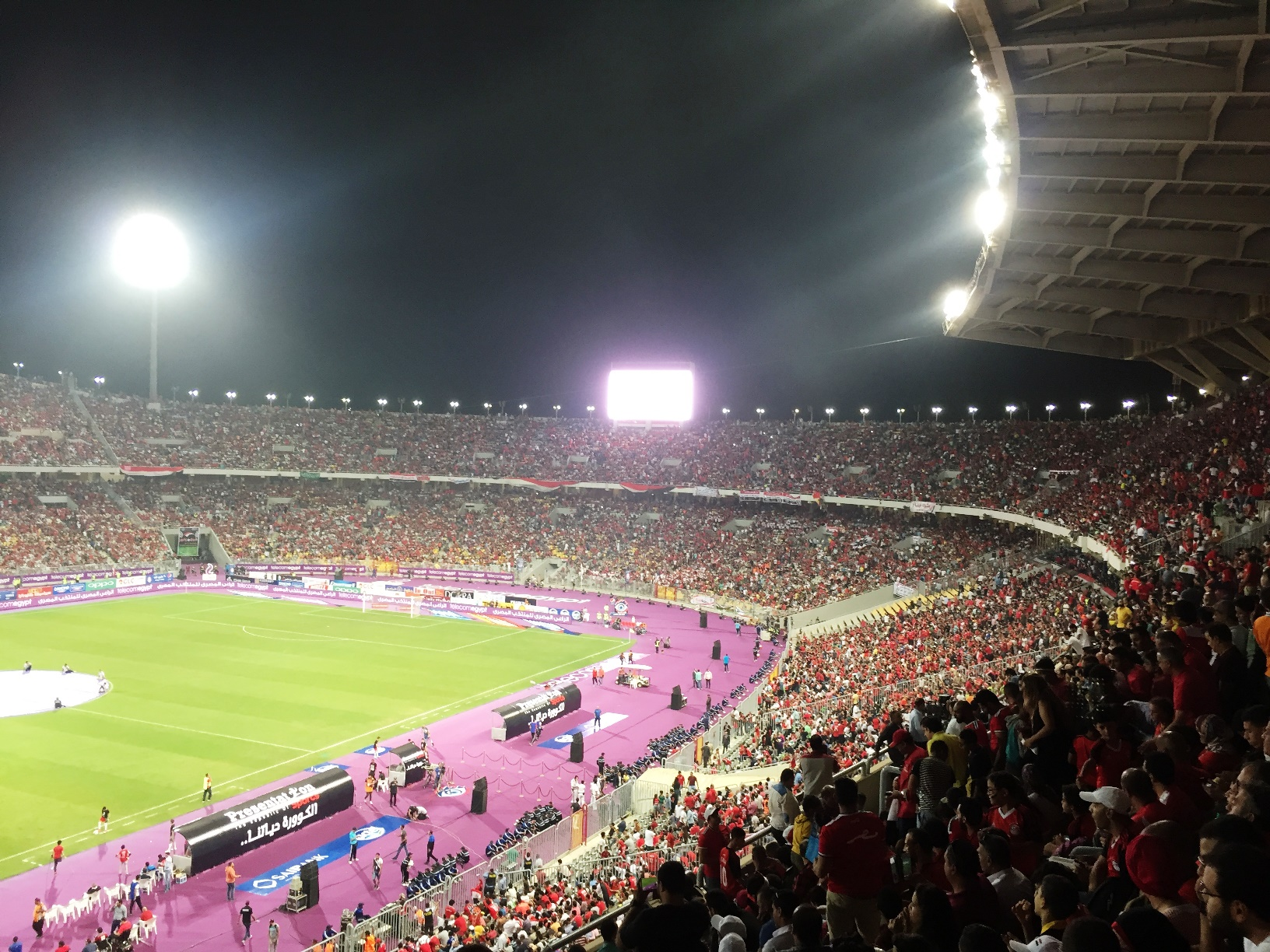
Borg El Arab Stadium during a match in the 2018 FIFA World Cup qualifiers in October 2017.

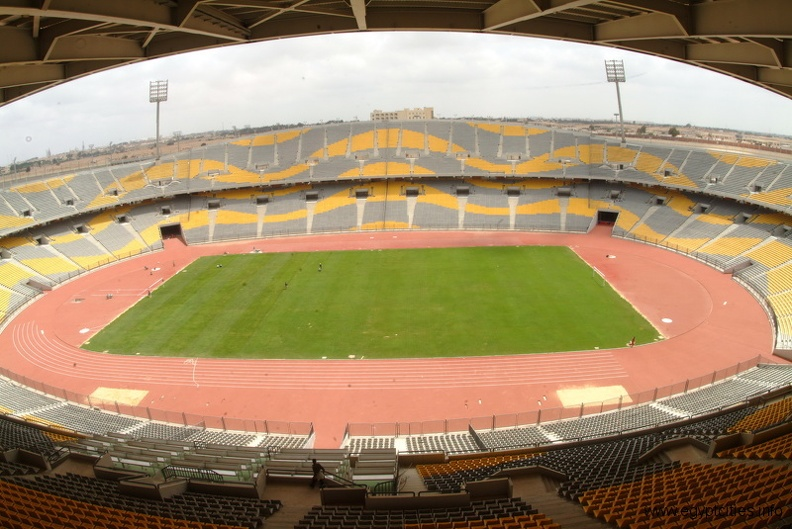
A view of Borg El Arab Stadium in 2005.

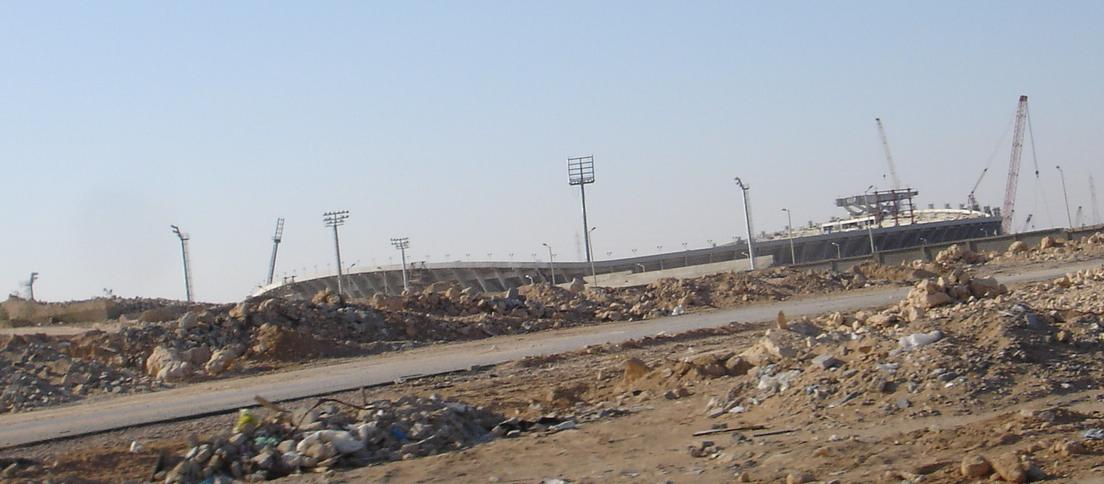
A view of the stadium while it was under construction in November 2005.

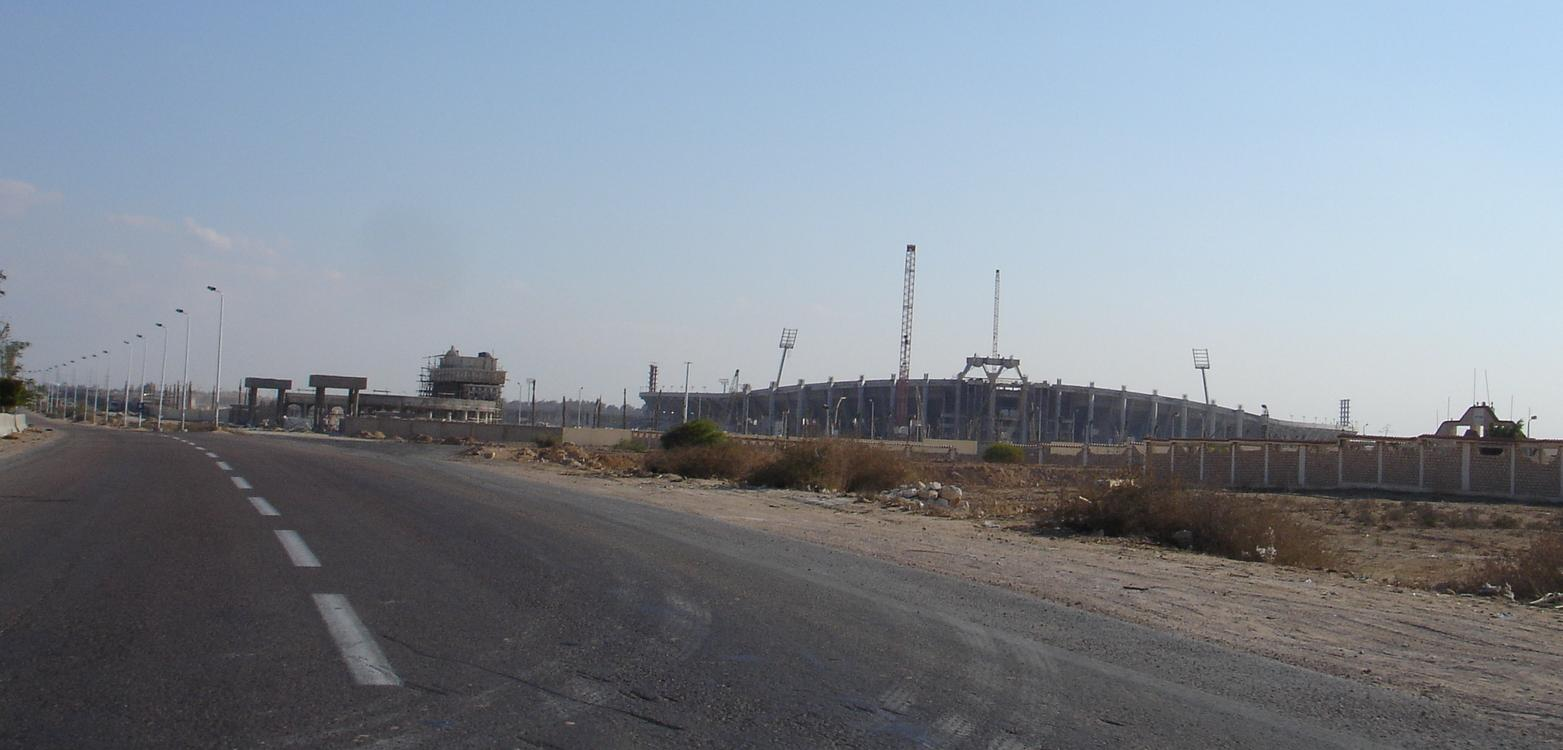
A view of the stadium while it was under construction in November 2005.

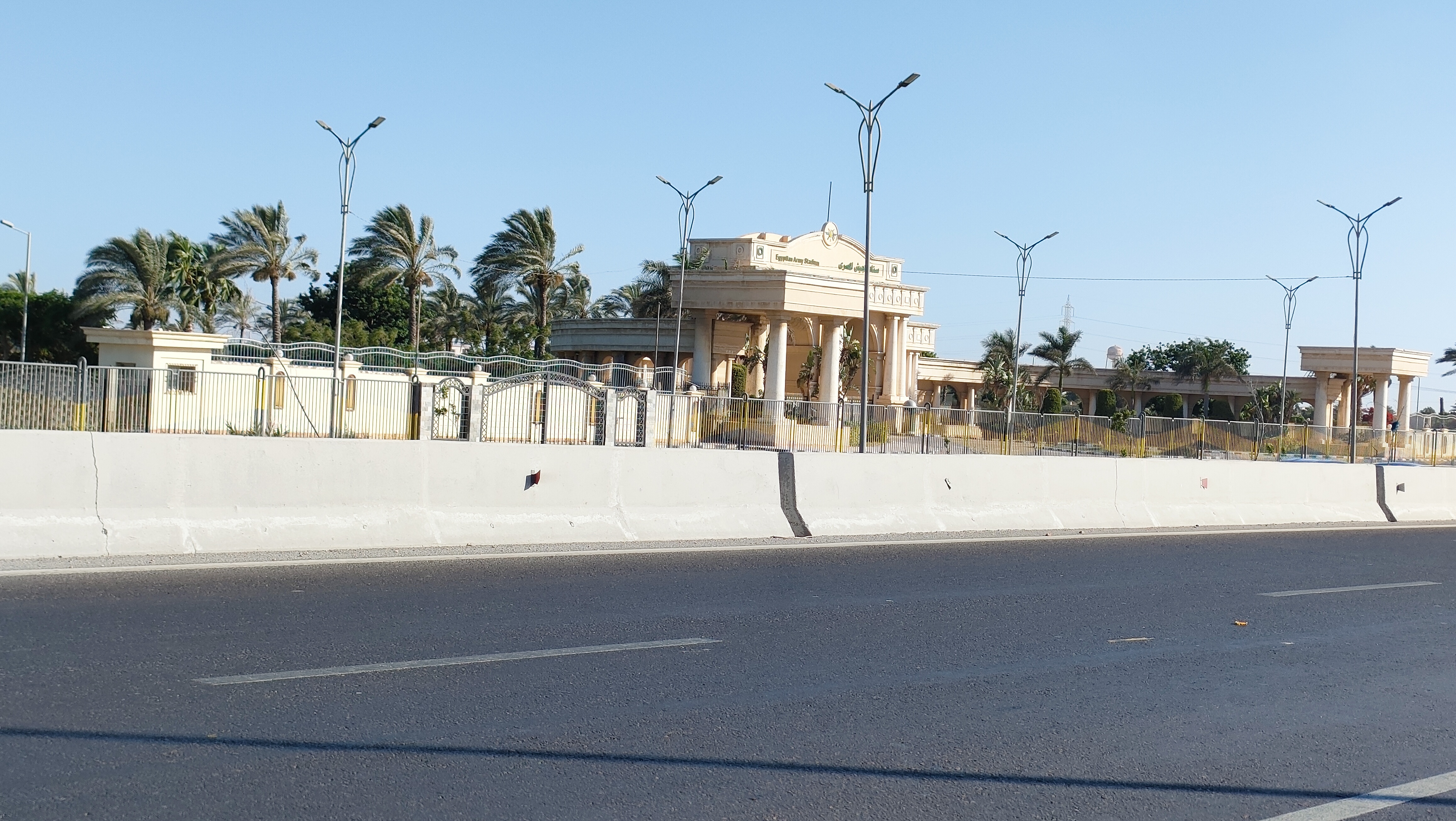

== See also ==
- Lists of stadiums
