= 2018–19 Egyptian Premier League =

Egyptian Premier League
- Season: 2018–19
- Dates: 31 July 2018 – 28 July 2019
- Champions: Al Ahly; 41st title
- Relegated: Petrojet; El Dakhleya; Nogoom
- Champions League: Al Ahly; Zamalek
- Confederation Cup: Pyramids; Al Masry
- Matches: 306
- Goals: 729 (2.38 per match)
- Top goalscorer: Ahmed Ali (18 goals)
- Best goalkeeper: Mohamed El Shenawy (13 clean sheets)
- Biggest home win: Tala'ea El Gaish 5–0 El Gouna (7 November 2018)
- Biggest away win: Tala'ea El Gaish 0–3 ENPPI (8 August 2018); ENPPI 1–4 Zamalek (1 September 2018); Misr Lel Makkasa 0–3 Al Ahly (24 January 2019); El Gouna 1–4 Al Mokawloon Al Arab (10 May 2019); El Dakhleya 0–3 Al Masry (27 May 2019)
- Highest scoring: Al Masry 5–3 Nogoom (11 September 2018)
- Longest winning run: 9 games Al Ahly; Zamalek
- Longest unbeaten run: 20 games Zamalek
- Longest winless run: 23 games El Dakhleya
- Longest losing run: 6 games Smouha

The 2018–19 Egyptian Premier League, also known as The WE League for sponsorship purposes, was the 60th season of the Egyptian Premier League, the top Egyptian professional league for association football clubs, since its establishment in 1948. The season started on 31 July 2018 and concluded on 28 July 2019. Fixtures for the 2018–19 season were announced on 8 July 2018.

El Gouna, Nogoom and Haras El Hodoud entered as the promoted teams from the 2017–18 Egyptian Second Division. They replaced El Raja, Tanta and Al Nasr who were relegated to the 2018–19 Egyptian Second Division.

Defending champions Al Ahly won their 4th consecutive and 41st overall Egyptian Premier League title on 24 July 2019, following their 3–1 away win against Al Mokawloon Al Arab.

== Overview ==
=== Fans return to the stadiums ===
From this season on, the Egyptian Football Association (EFA) officially allowed the fans to attend league matches again, after they showed great discipline while attending non-league matches in the previous years. The EFA banned all fans from attending all matches back in February 2012, where the Port Said Stadium riot occurred during Al Masry and Al Ahly match in the 2011–12 Egyptian Premier League, which resulted in the death of 72 Al Ahly fans, 1 Al Masry fan and 1 police officer. All Egyptian Premier League fixtures since then was played behind closed doors, and sometimes with a group of people who were invited by the clubs involving in a match.

=== Al Masry return to Port Said ===
From this season on, the Egyptian Football Association (EFA) was supposed to allow Al Masry to play all local home matches at Al Masry Club Stadium (previously known as Port Said Stadium) in Port Said, after the club successfully acquired the stadium from the Governorate of Port Said on 5 January 2016. However the local security authorities refused this decision, and the club ended up playing their home matches at various stadiums in different cities. The EFA banned Al Masry Club Stadium from hosting all football or sport activities after the Port Said Stadium riot occurred in 2012, and Al Masry played all of their local matches, both home and away, at Borg El Arab Stadium in Alexandria and at Ismailia Stadium in Ismailia for CAF matches since then.

=== Al Assiouty Sport takeover ===
On 18 June 2018, Mahmoud Al Assiouty, president of Al Assiouty Sport, announced that the club was officially sold to two investors from Saudi Arabia. The club name was changed to Pyramids Football Club, and the deal was later confirmed on 27 June 2018.

=== Nogoom El Mostakbal rebranding ===
On 29 July 2018, just two days before the start of the season, Nogoom El Mostakbal announced on their official Facebook page that the club name has been changed to Nogoom Football Club. Club president Mohamed El Tawila stated that the decision to rename the club came after they reached their goal by promoting to the Egyptian Premier League for the first time. The old name, Nogoom El Mostakbal, in Arabic, means "Future Stars", and the new name, Nogoom, means "Stars".

== Teams ==
Locations of the 2018–19 Egyptian Premier League teams

Eighteen teams competed in the league - the top fifteen teams from the previous season, and three teams promoted from the Second Division.

Teams promoted to the Egyptian Premier League
The first team to be promoted was Haras El Hodoud from Group C, following their 1–0 away win against Al Hammam on 10 April 2018. The Alexandrian side returned to the Premier League after staying only two season in the Second Division, and participated in the top flight for the fifteenth time in their history.

The second team to be promoted was El Gouna from Group A, following their 1–0 away win against Al Salam on 11 April 2018. El Gouna earned a spot in the Premier League for the fifth time in the club's history, having played four seasons in the top flight before with the 2014–15 season being the most recent.

The third team to be promoted was Nogoom (which was known as Nogoom El Mostakbal during that time) from Group B, following their 1–0 home win against Montakhab Suez on 18 April 2018. Nogoom managed to secure the promotion spot after a fierce contest that lasted until the last day of the league with Tersana, who lost 1–0 to Gomhoriat Shebin on the same day to confirm the promotion of Nogoom El Mostakbal to the Premier League for the first time in the club's history.

Teams relegated to the Egyptian Second Division
The first club to be relegated was Al Nasr, who suffered an immediate return to the Second Division following a 2–1 away defeat to Al Masry on 12 April 2018.

The second club to be relegated was Tanta, their stay in the Premier League came to an end after spending only two season in the top flight following a 1–2 home defeat to Al Masry on 21 April 2018.

The third club to be relegated was El Raja, who also suffered an immediate return to the Second Division after Wadi Degla secured the last safe spot in the Premier League following a 2–1 home win against El Entag El Harby on 21 April 2018.

=== Venues ===
| Al Ahly | El Dakhleya | ENPPI |
|---|---|---|
| Al Salam Stadium (Note: Al Ahly played their home matches at various stadiums, mainly at Al Salam Stadium, instead of Cairo International Stadium due to maintenance.) | Police Academy Stadium | Petro Sport Stadium |
| Capacity: **30,000** | Capacity: **12,000** | Capacity: **16,000** |
| El Entag El Harby | El Gouna | Haras El Hodoud |
| Al Salam Stadium | El Gouna Stadium | Haras El Hodoud Stadium |
| Capacity: **30,000** | Capacity: **10,000** | Capacity: **22,000** |
| Ismaily | Al Ittihad | Al Masry |
| Ismailia Stadium | Alexandria Stadium | Borg El Arab Stadium (Note: Al Masry played their home matches at various stadiums, mainly at Borg El Arab Stadium in Alexandria and the Egyptian Army Stadium in Suez, instead of Al Masry Club Stadium in Port Said due to security concerns and maintenance.) |
| Capacity: **18,525** | Capacity: **19,676** | Capacity: **86,000** |
| Misr Lel Makkasa | Al Mokawloon Al Arab | Nogoom |
| Osman Ahmed Osman Stadium (Note: Misr Lel Makkasa played their home matches at various stadiums, mainly at Osman Ahmed Osman Stadium in Cairo instead of Faiyum Stadium in Faiyum due to maintenance.) | Osman Ahmed Osman Stadium | Petro Sport Stadium |
| Capacity: **35,000** | Capacity: **35,000** | Capacity: **16,000** |
| Petrojet | Pyramids | Smouha |
| Suez Stadium (Note: Petrojet played some of their home matches at the Egyptian Army Stadium instead of Suez Stadium due to unavailability.) | 30 June Stadium | Borg El Arab Stadium |
| Capacity: **27,000** | Capacity: **30,000** | Capacity: **86,000** |
| Tala'ea El Gaish | Wadi Degla | Zamalek |
| Gehaz El Reyada Stadium | Cairo Military Academy Stadium | Petro Sport Stadium (Note: Zamalek played their home matches at various stadiums, mainly at Petro Sport Stadium instead of Cairo International Stadium due to maintenance.) |
| Capacity: **20,000** | Capacity: **28,500** | Capacity: **16,000** |

=== Personnel and kits ===
| Team | Manager | Captain | Kit manufacturer | Shirt sponsor |
|---|---|---|---|---|
| Al Ahly | (Uruguay) Martín Lasarte | (Egypt) Hossam Ashour | Umbro^{[note]} | WE, Lava, Royal Dutch Shell^{1}, Tiger Chips^{1}, Uber^{2}, GLC Paints^{2} |
| El Dakhleya | (Egypt) Diaa Abdel Samad | (Egypt) Rashad Farouk | Kone | **N/A** |
| ENPPI | (Egypt) Ali Maher | (Egypt) Ramy Sabry | Nike | **N/A** |
| El Entag El Harby | (Egypt) Mokhtar Mokhtar | (Egypt) Mahmoud El Badry | Uhlsport | **N/A** |
| El Gouna | (Egypt) Reda Shehata (caretaker) | (Egypt) Ahmed Said | Adidas | Orascom |
| Haras El Hodoud | (Egypt) Tarek El Ashry | (Egypt) Mostafa Gamal | Uhlsport | **N/A** |
| Ismaily | (Egypt) Mahmoud Gaber | (Egypt) Mahmoud Metwalli^{[note]} | Adidas | **N/A** |
| Al Ittihad | (Egypt) Talaat Youssef | (Egypt) El Hany Soliman | Uhlsport | **N/A** |
| Al Masry | (Egypt) Ehab Galal | (Egypt) Islam Salah | Adidas | **N/A** |
| Misr Lel Makkasa | (Egypt) Mido | (Egypt) Mido Gaber^{[note]} | Nike | **N/A** |
| Al Mokawloon Al Arab | (Egypt) Emad El Nahhas | (Egypt) Mahmoud Abou El Saoud | Adidas | **N/A** |
| Nogoom | (Egypt) Ramadan El Sayed | (Egypt) Mahmoud Fathalla | Macron | **N/A** |
| Petrojet | (Egypt) Mohamed Ouda | (Egypt) Hossam Hassan^{[note]} | Uhlsport | **N/A** |
| Pyramids | (France) Sébastien Desabre | (Egypt) Abdallah El Said^{[note]} | Kappa | Saudia, Swyp^{2} |
| Smouha | (Egypt) Hossam Hassan | (Egypt) El Sayed Farid | Uhlsport | **N/A** |
| Tala'ea El Gaish | (Brazil) Sérgio Farias | (Egypt) Mohamed Bassam | Macron | **N/A** |
| Wadi Degla | (Greece) Takis Gonias | (Egypt) Hossam Arafat^{[note]} | Joma | Neopolis |
| Zamalek | (Egypt) Khaled Galal | (Egypt) Hazem Emam | Puma^{[note]} | **N/A** |

1. On the back of shirt.
2. On the sleeves.
3. Al Ahly used previous season's kits made by Sporta until January 2019.
4. Ismaily's captain, Hosny Abd Rabo, announced his retirement from football in January 2019.
5. Misr Lel Makkasa's captain, Mahmoud Wahid, transferred to Al Ahly during the winter transfer window.
6. Petrojet's captain, Shimelis Bekele, transferred to Misr Lel Makkasa during the winter transfer window.
7. Pyramids's captain, Hamada Tolba, transferred to Petrojet during the winter transfer window.
8. Wadi Degla's captain, El Sayed Salem, transferred to Al Ittihad during the winter transfer window.
9. Zamalek used previous season's kits made by Joma until October 2018.

- WE, Oppo, El Kasrawy Group, SAIB Bank, EgyptAir and GLC Paints are the league's main sponsors, and their logos are printed on most of the teams' kits.
- Additionally, referee kits are made by Adidas.

=== Managerial changes ===
| Team | Outgoing manager | Manner of departure | Date of vacancy | Position in table | Incoming manager | Date of appointment |
|---|---|---|---|---|---|---|
| Nogoom (Note: The club was known as Nogoom El Mostakbal Football Club during that period of time, before being renamed to Nogoom Football Club.) | (Egypt) Mohamed Salah | Signed by Pharco | 26 April 2018 | Pre-season | (Egypt) Diaa El Sayed | 22 May 2018 |
| Haras El Hodoud | (Egypt) Samy Komsan | Sacked | 14 May 2018 | Pre-season | (Egypt) Emad Soliman | 16 May 2018 |
| Smouha | (Egypt) Mimi Abdel Razek | Mutual consent | 18 May 2018 | Pre-season | (Egypt) Ali Maher | 21 May 2018 |
| Wadi Degla | (Egypt) Tarek El Ashry | Resigned | 21 May 2018 | Pre-season | (Greece) Takis Gonias | 12 June 2018 |
| Pyramids (Note: The club was known as Al Assiouty Sport during that period of time, before being sold and renamed to Pyramids Football Club.) | (Egypt) Ali Maher | Signed by Smouha | 21 May 2018 | Pre-season | (Egypt) Samy El Sheshini | 1 June 2018 |
| Ismaily | (Portugal) Pedro Barny | Mutual consent | 23 May 2018 | Pre-season | (Algeria) Kheïreddine Madoui | 24 May 2018 |
| Al Ahly | (Egypt) Ahmed Ayoub | End of caretaker spell | 12 June 2018 | Pre-season | (France) Patrice Carteron | 12 June 2018 |
| Pyramids | (Egypt) Samy El Sheshini | Sacked | 18 June 2018 | Pre-season | (Brazil) Alberto Valentim | 28 June 2018 |
| Zamalek | (Egypt) Khaled Galal | Sacked | 3 July 2018 | Pre-season | (Switzerland) Christian Gross | 3 July 2018 |
| Nogoom | (Egypt) Diaa El Sayed | Mutual consent | 23 July 2018 | Pre-season | (Egypt) Alaa Hasaballah (caretaker) | 29 July 2018 |
| Nogoom | (Egypt) Alaa Hasaballah | End of caretaker spell | 11 August 2018 | 13th | (Spain) Antonio Calderón | 11 August 2018 |
| Pyramids | (Brazil) Alberto Valentim | Mutual consent | 16 August 2018 | 4th | (Argentina) Ricardo La Volpe | 17 August 2018 |
| Nogoom | (Spain) Antonio Calderón | Resigned | 14 September 2018 | 14th | (Egypt) Alaa Hasaballah (caretaker) | 14 September 2018 |
| Haras El Hodoud | (Egypt) Emad Soliman | Resigned | 20 September 2018 | 18th | (Egypt) Tarek El Ashry | 20 September 2018 |
| Al Ittihad | (Egypt) Mohamed Omar | Resigned | 22 September 2018 | 14th | (Egypt) Helmy Toulan | 24 September 2018 |
| Ismaily | (Algeria) Kheïreddine Madoui | Mutual consent | 23 September 2018 | 9th | (Egypt) Mohamed Abou Grisha (caretaker) | 23 September 2018 |
| Nogoom | (Egypt) Alaa Hasaballah | End of caretaker spell | 23 September 2018 | 16th | (Egypt) Ahmed Samy | 25 September 2018 |
| Ismaily | (Egypt) Mohamed Abou Grisha | End of caretaker spell | 4 October 2018 | 14th | (Brazil) Jorvan Vieira | 4 October 2018 |
| Al Mokawloon Al Arab | (Egypt) Alaa Nabil | Resigned | 24 October 2018 | 18th | (Egypt) Emad El Nahhas | 24 October 2018 |
| Al Masry | (Egypt) Hossam Hassan | Resigned | 29 October 2018 | 14th | (Egypt) Mimi Abdel Razek | 30 October 2018 |
| Pyramids | (Argentina) Ricardo La Volpe | Mutual consent | 29 October 2018 | 4th | (Egypt) Hossam Hassan | 29 October 2018 |
| Petrojet | (Egypt) Tarek Yehia | Resigned | 6 November 2018 | 17th | (Egypt) Ahmed Abdel Fattah (caretaker) | 6 November 2018 |
| Petrojet | (Egypt) Ahmed Abdel Fattah | End of caretaker spell | 13 November 2018 | 18th | (Egypt) Moamen Soliman | 13 November 2018 |
| Smouha | (Egypt) Ali Maher | Resigned | 13 November 2018 | 3rd | (Egypt) Tarek Yehia | 14 November 2018 |
| Al Masry | (Egypt) Mimi Abdel Razek | Sacked | 22 November 2018 | 16th | (Egypt) Mostafa Younis (caretaker) | 22 November 2018 |
| Tala'ea El Gaish | (Egypt) Mohamed Helmy | Resigned | 22 November 2018 | 7th | (Belgium) Luc Eymael | 23 November 2018 |
| Al Ahly | (France) Patrice Carteron | Sacked | 22 November 2018 | 18th | (Egypt) Mohamed Youssef (caretaker) | 22 November 2018 |
| El Gouna | (Egypt) Hesham Zakaria | Resigned | 27 November 2018 | 10th | (Egypt) Hamada Sedki | 29 November 2018 |
| ENPPI | (Egypt) Khaled Metwalli | Resigned | 29 November 2018 | 16th | (Egypt) Ali Maher | 1 December 2018 |
| Ismaily | (Brazil) Jorvan Vieira | Resigned | 11 December 2018 | 18th | (North Macedonia) Čedomir Janevski | 15 December 2018 |
| Al Masry | (Egypt) Mostafa Younis | Resigned | 15 December 2018 | 11th | (Egypt) Ehab Galal | 15 December 2018 |
| Al Ahly | (Egypt) Mohamed Youssef | End of caretaker spell | 29 December 2018 | 6th | (Uruguay) Martín Lasarte | 30 December 2018 |
| Smouha | (Egypt) Tarek Yehia | Sacked | 17 January 2019 | 9th | (Egypt) Adel Abdel Rahman | 17 January 2019 |
| Pyramids | (Egypt) Hossam Hassan | Sacked | 24 January 2019 | 2nd | (Egypt) Ahmed Hassan (caretaker) | 26 January 2019 |
| Petrojet | (Egypt) Moamen Soliman | Sacked | 31 January 2019 | 18th | (Egypt) Mohamed Ouda | 31 January 2019 |
| Pyramids | (Egypt) Ahmed Hassan | End of caretaker spell | 5 February 2019 | 2nd | (Argentina) Ramón Díaz | 5 February 2019 |
| Smouha | (Egypt) Adel Abdel Rahman | Sacked | 21 February 2019 | 12th | (Egypt) Hossam Hassan | 22 February 2019 |
| Nogoom | (Egypt) Ahmed Samy | Resigned | 27 February 2019 | 17th | (Egypt) Moamen Soliman | 27 February 2019 |
| Misr Lel Makkasa | (Egypt) Talaat Youssef | Resigned | 19 April 2019 | 6th | (Egypt) Gamal Omar (caretaker) | 20 April 2019 |
| Nogoom | (Egypt) Moamen Soliman | Sacked | 20 April 2019 | 18th | (Egypt) Ramadan El Sayed | 23 April 2019 |
| Ismaily | (North Macedonia) Čedomir Janevski | Sacked | 26 April 2019 | 7th | (Egypt) Mahmoud Gaber | 26 April 2019 |
| El Dakhleya | (Egypt) Alaa Abdel Aal | Resigned | 13 May 2019 | 17th | (Egypt) Diaa Abdel Samad | 13 May 2019 |
| Al Ittihad | (Egypt) Helmy Toulan | Resigned | 22 May 2019 | 13th | (Egypt) Talaat Youssef (Note: Talaat Youssef was initially appointed as caretaker manager on 22 May 2019 until the end of the season. On 12 June 2019, Al Ittihad renewed his contract and appointed him as a permanent manager.) | 22 May 2019 |
| Zamalek | (Switzerland) Christian Gross | Sacked | 28 May 2019 | 3rd | (Egypt) Khaled Galal | 31 May 2019 |
| Tala'ea El Gaish | (Belgium) Luc Eymael | Resigned | 28 May 2019 | 8th | (Brazil) Sérgio Farias | 11 July 2019 |
| Pyramids | (Argentina) Ramón Díaz | Resigned | 31 May 2019 | 2nd | (France) Sébastien Desabre | 8 July 2019 |
| Misr Lel Makkasa | (Egypt) Gamal Omar | End of caretaker spell | 9 June 2019 | 6th | (Egypt) Mido | 9 June 2019 |
| El Gouna | (Egypt) Hamada Sedki | Mutual consent | 10 June 2019 | 15th | (Egypt) Reda Shehata (caretaker) | 19 July 2019 |

=== Foreign players ===
Clubs could have a maximum of four foreign players registered during the season. Clubs could not sign foreign players unless these players had played in the first or second tier in their countries. Clubs also could not sign any foreign goalkeepers. In addition, each club could register a total of two players from Palestine or Syria; those players were treated as Egyptians, and did not count as foreign players.

- Players name in **bold** indicates the player is registered during the mid-season transfer window.
- Players name in ITALICS indicates the player have left the club during the mid-season transfer window.

| Club | Player 1 | Player 2 | Player 3 | Player 4 | Palestine/Syria Player(s) | Former Player(s) |
|---|---|---|---|---|---|---|
| Al Ahly | (Angola) **Geraldo** | (Morocco) Walid Azaro | (Nigeria) Junior Ajayi | (Tunisia) Ali Maâloul | | (Mali) Salif Coulibaly (South Africa) Phakamani Mahlambi |
| El Dakhleya | (Nigeria) Emmanuel Agbettor | (Nigeria) **Anousa Isha** | (Nigeria) **Yaro Zakari** | (Rwanda) **Kevin Muhire** | | (Brazil) John Lennon (Burkina Faso) Saïdou Simporé (Gabon) Cédric Ondo Biyoghé (Nigeria) Uche Ihuarulam |
| ENPPI | (Democratic Republic of the Congo) **Chadrack Lukombe** | (Ivory Coast) **Wilfried Yessoh** | (Mali) Aboubacar Diarra | (Tanzania) **Shiza Kichuya** | | (Argentina) Brian Ferreira (Burkina Faso) Yaya Sanou (Honduras) Marlon Ramírez (Nigeria) Odah Marshall (United States) Noah Sadaoui |
| El Entag El Harby | (Ghana) Abdulwahab Annan | (Guinea) Moussa Diawara | (Nigeria) James Owoboskini | | (Palestine) **Hamed Hamdan** | (Nigeria) Emeka Eze (Nigeria) Solomon Okuruket (Zimbabwe) Abbas Amidu |
| El Gouna | (Cameroon) Jonathan Ngwem | (Ethiopia) Gatoch Panom | (Ivory Coast) **Serge Aka** | (Senegal) **Ousseynou Boye** | | (Ivory Coast) Abdoulaye Coulibaly (Nigeria) Chisom Chikatara (Palestine) Ramzi Saleh |
| Haras El Hodoud | (Cameroon) **Cyrille Ndaney** | (Ivory Coast) **Ibrahim Koné** | (Liberia) **Amadaiya Rennie** | (Nigeria) Edu Moses | | (Ghana) Pampa Lissian (Guinea) Daouda Bangoura (Uganda) Isaac Muleme |
| Ismaily | (Ghana) Richard Baffour | (Namibia) **Benson Shilongo** | (Nigeria) **Odah Marshall** | (Tanzania) **Yahya Zayd** | | (Cameroon) Christopher Mendouga (Colombia) Diego Calderón (Ghana) Thomas Abbey (Mali) Moussa Camara (Nigeria) Okiki Afolabi (Nigeria) Taro Godswill (Tunisia) Lassaâd Jaziri |
| Al Ittihad | (Brazil) **Wallace da Silva** | (Guinea-Bissau) **Toni Silva** | (Ivory Coast) Razack Cissé | (Nigeria) **Derick Ogbu** | | (Ghana) Emmanuel Banahene (Ivory Coast) Didier Koré (Ivory Coast) Manucho (Togo) Wilson Akakpo (Tunisia) Mohamed Ali Moncer |
| Al Masry | (Burkina Faso) **Saïdou Simporé** | (Nigeria) **Austin Amutu** | (Nigeria) **Ezekiel Bassey** | (Nigeria) Emeka Eze | (Palestine) **Mohammed Saleh** (Palestine) Mahmoud Wadi | (Burkina Faso) Aristide Bancé (Burkina Faso) Mohamed Koffi (Burkina Faso) Issouf Ouattara (Ivory Coast) Cheick Moukoro (Ghana) Torric Jebrin (Syria) Abdullah Al Shami |
| Misr Lel Makkasa | (Ethiopia) **Shimelis Bekele** | (Ghana) John Antwi | (Madagascar) Paulin Voavy | | | (Burkina Faso) Eric Traoré (Rwanda) Kevin Muhire (Senegal) Arouna Sene |
| Al Mokawloon Al Arab | (Burkina Faso) **Farouck Kabore** | (Colombia) Luis Hinestroza | (Tunisia) **Seifeddine Jaziri** | | | (Brazil) Júnior (Brazil) Edgar Silva (The Gambia) Saikou Conteh (Ghana) Torric Jebrin (Ivory Coast) Didier Koré (Nigeria) Solomon Okuruket |
| Nogoom | (Guinea) **Joël Lamah** | (Ivory Coast) **Didier Koré** | (Nigeria) Michael Azekhumen | (Nigeria) **Tosin Omoyele** | | (Zambia) Aubrey Chirwa |
| Petrojet | (France) **Chris Gadi** | (Ivory Coast) Santi Corre | (Ivory Coast) Mohamed Vieira | (Tanzania) Himid Mao | | (Ethiopia) Shimelis Bekele (Ghana) Benjamin Acheampong (Morocco) Omar Najdi |
| Pyramids | (Brazil) Keno | (Burkina Faso) **Eric Traoré** | (Ecuador) **Jhon Cifuente** | (Peru) **Cristian Benavente** | (Syria) **Omar Kharbin** (Syria) Omar Midani | (Brazil) Arthur (Brazil) Carlos Eduardo (Brazil) Ribamar (Brazil) Rodriguinho (Burkina Faso) Moussa Dao (Germany) Dani Schahin (Namibia) Benson Shilongo (Nigeria) Azubuike Okechukwu (Palestine) Hamed Hamdan (South Africa) Gift Links (Uganda) Isaac Muleme |
| Smouha | (Democratic Republic of the Congo) **Eddy Ngoyi** | (Ethiopia) Oumed Oukri | (Senegal) **Cheikh Bamba** | (Uganda) Derrick Nsibambi | | (Burkina Faso) Patrick Malo (Ghana) Hans Kwofie (Ghana) Augustine Okrah (Ghana) Stephen Sarfo (Guinea) Yamodou Touré (Ivory Coast) Mansou Kouakou (Namibia) Benson Shilongo |
| Tala'ea El Gaish | (Gabon) Franck Engonga | (Nigeria) **Chisom Chikatara** | (Senegal) Talla N'Diaye | (Togo) **Richard Boro** | | (Burkina Faso) Jérôme Ouiya (Ghana) David Ofei (Uganda) Hassan Wasswa |
| Wadi Degla | (Ghana) **Issahaku Yakubu** | (Greece) Vasilis Bouzas | (Ivory Coast) Yaya Soumahoro | (Senegal) Ibrahima Ndiaye | | (Burkina Faso) Patrick Malo (Mali) Boubacar Traoré (Togo) Richard Boro |
| Zamalek | (Morocco) Hamid Ahaddad | (Morocco) **Khalid Boutaïb** | (Tunisia) Hamdi Nagguez | (Tunisia) Ferjani Sassi | | (Burkina Faso) Maarouf Youssef (Democratic Republic of the Congo) Kabongo Kasongo (Ghana) Benjamin Acheampong (Ghana) Nana Poku (Syria) Moayad Ajan |

== Results ==
=== League table ===
| Pos | Team | Pld | W | D | L | GF | GA | GD | Pts | Qualification or relegation |
|---|---|---|---|---|---|---|---|---|---|---|
| 1 | Al Ahly (C) | 34 | 25 | 5 | 4 | 56 | 20 | +36 | 80 | Qualification for the Champions League |
| 2 | Zamalek | 34 | 21 | 9 | 4 | 65 | 31 | +34 | 72 | Qualification for the Champions League |
| 3 | Pyramids | 34 | 19 | 13 | 2 | 61 | 31 | +30 | 70 | Qualification for the Confederation Cup (Note: Since the 2018–19 Egypt Cup wouldn't finish by the CAF deadline, the spot awarded to the Egypt Cup winners (Confederation Cup preliminary or first round) was passed to the fourth-placed team, Al Masry.) |
| 4 | Al Masry | 34 | 12 | 16 | 6 | 45 | 38 | +7 | 52 | Qualification for the Confederation Cup |
| 5 | Al Mokawloon Al Arab | 34 | 13 | 9 | 12 | 45 | 38 | +7 | 48 | |
| 6 | Misr Lel Makkasa | 34 | 12 | 10 | 12 | 34 | 36 | −2 | 46 | |
| 7 | Ismaily | 34 | 10 | 13 | 11 | 30 | 36 | −6 | 43 | |
| 8 | Tala'ea El Gaish | 34 | 10 | 11 | 13 | 41 | 39 | +2 | 41 | |
| 9 | ENPPI | 34 | 9 | 13 | 12 | 39 | 42 | −3 | 40 (Note: Tied on head-to-head points (3), on head-to-head goal difference (0), on head-to-head goals scored (3) and on head-to-head away goals scored (2). Overall goal difference: ENPPI –3, Wadi Degla –6.) | |
| 10 | Wadi Degla | 34 | 10 | 10 | 14 | 41 | 47 | −6 | 40 | |
| 11 | Al Ittihad | 34 | 9 | 12 | 13 | 41 | 56 | −15 | 39 | |
| 12 | Smouha | 34 | 8 | 14 | 12 | 33 | 41 | −8 | 38 (Note: Head-to-head points: Smouha 10, El Entag El Harby 8, El Gouna 7, Haras El Hodoud 5.) | |
| 13 | El Entag El Harby | 34 | 8 | 14 | 12 | 36 | 44 | −8 | 38 | |
| 14 | El Gouna | 34 | 8 | 14 | 12 | 38 | 52 | −14 | 38 | |
| 15 | Haras El Hodoud | 34 | 8 | 14 | 12 | 30 | 37 | −7 | 38 | |
| 16 | Petrojet (R) | 34 | 8 | 11 | 15 | 30 | 43 | −13 | 35 | Relegation to the Second Division |
| 17 | El Dakhleya (R) | 34 | 4 | 15 | 15 | 34 | 52 | −18 | 27 | Relegation to the Second Division |
| 18 | Nogoom (R) | 34 | 5 | 11 | 18 | 30 | 46 | −16 | 26 | Relegation to the Second Division |

Source: Soccerway
Rules for classification: 1) Points; 2) Head-to-Head points; 3) Head-to-Head goal difference; 4) Head-to-Head goals scored; 5) Head-to-Head away goals scored; 6) Goal difference; 7) Goals scored (Note: Head-to-head record is used only after all the matches between the teams in question have been played).
(C) Champions; (R) Relegated

=== Positions by round ===
The table lists the positions of teams after each week of matches. In order to preserve chronological evolvements, any postponed matches were not included in the round at which they were originally scheduled, but added to the full round they were played immediately afterwards. For example, if a match was scheduled for matchday 13, but then postponed and played between days 16 and 17, it was added to the standings for day 16.

| Team \ Round | 1 | 2 | 3 | 4 | 5 | 6 | 7 | 8 | 9 | 10 | 11 | 12 | 13 | 14 | 15 | 16 | 17 | 18 | 19 | 20 | 21 | 22 | 23 | 24 | 25 | 26 | 27 | 28 | 29 | 30 | 31 | 32 | 33 | 34 |
|---|---|---|---|---|---|---|---|---|---|---|---|---|---|---|---|---|---|---|---|---|---|---|---|---|---|---|---|---|---|---|---|---|---|---|
| Al Ahly | 8 | 3 | 2 | 1 | 1 | 4 | 4 | 7 | 7 | 9 | 12 | 12 | 14 | 17 | 18 | 5 | 6 | 7 | 4 | 3 | 3 | 3 | 3 | 3 | 3 | 2 | 2 | 1 | 3 | 2 | 1 | 1 | 1 | 1 |
| Zamalek | 14 | 2 | 1 | 5 | 3 | 1 | 2 | 1 | 1 | 1 | 2 | 1 | 1 | 1 | 1 | 1 | 1 | 1 | 1 | 1 | 1 | 1 | 1 | 1 | 1 | 1 | 1 | 2 | 2 | 3 | 3 | 3 | 3 | 2 |
| Pyramids | 4 | 6 | 5 | 2 | 2 | 3 | 1 | 2 | 3 | 3 | 4 | 3 | 5 | 2 | 2 | 2 | 2 | 2 | 2 | 2 | 2 | 2 | 2 | 2 | 2 | 3 | 3 | 3 | 1 | 1 | 2 | 2 | 2 | 3 |
| Al Masry | 3 | 11 | 10 | 10 | 10 | 6 | 8 | 8 | 10 | 12 | 14 | 13 | 15 | 15 | 16 | 12 | 11 | 12 | 14 | 7 | 7 | 7 | 6 | 4 | 4 | 4 | 4 | 4 | 4 | 4 | 4 | 4 | 4 | 4 |
| Al Mokawloon Al Arab | 6 | 14 | 8 | 13 | 14 | 10 | 12 | 15 | 16 | 17 | 18 | 18 | 16 | 13 | 8 | 6 | 5 | 4 | 6 | 6 | 6 | 5 | 5 | 6 | 6 | 6 | 6 | 6 | 6 | 5 | 5 | 5 | 5 | 5 |
| Misr Lel Makkasa | 16 | 10 | 13 | 15 | 15 | 11 | 6 | 4 | 5 | 5 | 7 | 5 | 2 | 4 | 3 | 3 | 3 | 3 | 3 | 4 | 4 | 4 | 4 | 5 | 5 | 5 | 5 | 5 | 5 | 6 | 6 | 6 | 6 | 6 |
| Ismaily | 5 | 12 | 14 | 9 | 8 | 8 | 9 | 11 | 14 | 14 | 11 | 11 | 12 | 14 | 15 | 18 | 18 | 18 | 17 | 11 | 11 | 8 | 8 | 8 | 9 | 9 | 7 | 7 | 7 | 7 | 7 | 7 | 7 | 7 |
| Tala'ea El Gaish | 13 | 15 | 17 | 16 | 12 | 15 | 11 | 10 | 13 | 8 | 8 | 10 | 7 | 7 | 7 | 9 | 8 | 6 | 7 | 8 | 8 | 9 | 9 | 9 | 10 | 12 | 10 | 12 | 9 | 13 | 14 | 8 | 8 | 8 |
| ENPPI | 17 | 8 | 12 | 6 | 9 | 12 | 14 | 9 | 11 | 11 | 10 | 9 | 11 | 12 | 14 | 17 | 16 | 15 | 16 | 16 | 16 | 16 | 17 | 18 | 18 | 18 | 14 | 16 | 15 | 15 | 15 | 10 | 9 | 9 |
| Wadi Degla | 7 | 17 | 18 | 18 | 18 | 18 | 17 | 18 | 15 | 16 | 13 | 14 | 10 | 10 | 10 | 14 | 15 | 13 | 10 | 17 | 17 | 17 | 18 | 15 | 12 | 13 | 12 | 11 | 13 | 11 | 12 | 12 | 12 | 10 |
| Al Ittihad | 10 | 16 | 11 | 12 | 13 | 13 | 13 | 14 | 9 | 6 | 5 | 8 | 8 | 11 | 6 | 8 | 9 | 10 | 13 | 15 | 15 | 12 | 13 | 14 | 14 | 7 | 8 | 9 | 10 | 14 | 8 | 9 | 13 | 11 |
| Smouha | 1 | 7 | 3 | 3 | 4 | 7 | 5 | 3 | 4 | 4 | 3 | 4 | 3 | 3 | 5 | 7 | 7 | 8 | 9 | 9 | 9 | 10 | 12 | 13 | 15 | 15 | 17 | 15 | 14 | 12 | 10 | 14 | 10 | 12 |
| El Entag El Harby | 2 | 5 | 4 | 4 | 5 | 2 | 3 | 5 | 2 | 2 | 1 | 2 | 4 | 5 | 4 | 4 | 4 | 5 | 5 | 5 | 5 | 6 | 7 | 7 | 7 | 8 | 9 | 8 | 8 | 8 | 11 | 11 | 11 | 13 |
| El Gouna | 18 | 9 | 7 | 8 | 6 | 5 | 7 | 6 | 6 | 7 | 6 | 7 | 9 | 8 | 9 | 15 | 14 | 16 | 15 | 12 | 12 | 13 | 10 | 10 | 8 | 10 | 11 | 10 | 11 | 9 | 9 | 13 | 14 | 14 |
| Haras El Hodoud | 15 | 18 | 16 | 17 | 17 | 17 | 18 | 16 | 17 | 18 | 17 | 17 | 18 | 16 | 13 | 10 | 10 | 9 | 8 | 10 | 10 | 11 | 11 | 11 | 11 | 11 | 13 | 13 | 16 | 16 | 16 | 15 | 15 | 15 |
| Petrojet | 12 | 1 | 6 | 7 | 7 | 9 | 10 | 13 | 12 | 13 | 15 | 15 | 17 | 18 | 17 | 16 | 17 | 17 | 18 | 18 | 18 | 18 | 15 | 12 | 13 | 14 | 15 | 14 | 12 | 10 | 13 | 16 | 16 | 16 |
| El Dakhleya | 9 | 4 | 9 | 14 | 16 | 16 | 16 | 12 | 8 | 10 | 9 | 6 | 6 | 9 | 12 | 11 | 13 | 11 | 12 | 14 | 14 | 14 | 14 | 16 | 16 | 16 | 16 | 17 | 17 | 17 | 17 | 17 | 17 | 17 |
| Nogoom | 11 | 13 | 15 | 11 | 11 | 14 | 15 | 17 | 18 | 15 | 16 | 16 | 13 | 6 | 11 | 13 | 12 | 14 | 11 | 13 | 13 | 15 | 16 | 17 | 17 | 17 | 18 | 18 | 18 | 18 | 18 | 18 | 18 | 18 |

Source: Soccerway

| Leader |
| 2019–20 CAF Champions League |
| 2019–20 CAF Confederation Cup |
| Relegation to 2019–20 Egyptian Second Division |

=== Results table ===
| Home \ Away | AHL | DKH | ENP | ENT | GOU | HRS | ISM | ITH | MAS | MMK | MOK | NOG | PET | PYR | SMO | TGS | WDG | ZAM |
|---|---|---|---|---|---|---|---|---|---|---|---|---|---|---|---|---|---|---|
| Al Ahly | — | 3–1 | 2–0 | 0–0 | 2–1 | 1–0 | 1–1 | 3–4 | 2–0 | 2–1 | 0–1 | 2–0 | 4–0 | 0–1 | 1–0 | 2–0 | 1–0 | 1–0 |
| El Dakhleya | 2–2 | — | 1–1 | 0–1 | 2–2 | 0–1 | 0–0 | 3–0 | 0–3 | 0–0 | 0–2 | 1–2 | 0–2 | 0–2 | 0–2 | 2–1 | 1–1 | 1–2 |
| ENPPI | 1–2 | 1–1 | — | 1–0 | 4–0 | 0–0 | 0–0 | 0–1 | 1–3 | 2–1 | 0–0 | 1–1 | 2–1 | 0–1 | 2–3 | 1–0 | 1–2 | 1–4 |
| El Entag El Harby | 0–1 | 2–2 | 2–2 | — | 0–0 | 2–1 | 0–0 | 2–4 | 0–0 | 1–3 | 1–2 | 1–1 | 2–1 | 1–1 | 2–2 | 2–1 | 1–2 | 1–2 |
| El Gouna | 1–2 | 3–2 | 1–1 | 2–3 | — | 1–1 | 0–0 | 1–2 | 0–1 | 0–0 | 1–4 | 1–1 | 2–1 | 2–1 | 1–1 | 2–0 | 0–2 | 2–2 |
| Haras El Hodoud | 0–2 | 1–2 | 0–0 | 2–1 | 1–2 | — | 1–0 | 1–1 | 3–0 | 0–0 | 0–0 | 1–0 | 2–2 | 1–1 | 1–2 | 1–3 | 4–1 | 1–1 |
| Ismaily | 1–1 | 2–0 | 3–2 | 1–2 | 2–2 | 0–1 | — | 2–0 | 0–0 | 1–0 | 2–0 | 3–2 | 0–0 | 2–0 | 1–3 | 0–0 | 1–3 | 0–2 |
| Al Ittihad | 0–2 | 1–1 | 0–1 | 1–1 | 2–1 | 1–1 | 1–0 | — | 2–2 | 0–0 | 1–1 | 0–2 | 1–1 | 2–3 | 3–1 | 1–1 | 2–2 | 1–3 |
| Al Masry | 0–2 | 1–1 | 3–1 | 2–2 | 0–2 | 0–1 | 1–1 | 2–2 | — | 2–0 | 1–0 | 5–3 | 1–0 | 3–3 | 4–2 | 1–1 | 0–0 | 2–1 |
| Misr Lel Makkasa | 0–3 | 0–1 | 4–3 | 2–1 | 0–0 | 3–0 | 0–0 | 1–0 | 0–0 | — | 2–1 | 2–1 | 1–2 | 1–1 | 1–2 | 1–1 | 2–1 | 0–1 |
| Al Mokawloon Al Arab | 1–3 | 2–2 | 1–2 | 2–0 | 4–2 | 1–0 | 1–2 | 2–1 | 2–2 | 1–2 | — | 2–2 | 3–0 | 0–1 | 2–1 | 2–0 | 0–1 | 2–2 |
| Nogoom | 0–2 | 1–1 | 1–1 | 0–1 | 0–0 | 0–0 | 1–1 | 1–2 | 0–1 | 0–2 | 0–2 | — | 3–2 | 0–2 | 4–0 | 0–0 | 0–1 | 0–1 |
| Petrojet | 0–1 | 1–1 | 0–0 | 1–0 | 1–2 | 0–0 | 0–1 | 1–0 | 2–2 | 0–1 | 0–0 | 2–1 | — | 0–2 | 1–0 | 0–1 | 1–0 | 0–0 |
| Pyramids | 2–1 | 3–1 | 1–1 | 1–1 | 1–1 | 3–1 | 3–1 | 3–0 | 1–1 | 2–0 | 1–0 | 2–0 | 3–3 | — | 4–0 | 3–1 | 1–1 | 1–0 |
| Smouha | 0–1 | 1–1 | 0–0 | 2–0 | 0–0 | 1–1 | 0–1 | 1–1 | 0–0 | 1–1 | 1–2 | 0–0 | 2–0 | 1–1 | — | 0–0 | 2–3 | 1–1 |
| Tala'ea El Gaish | 1–2 | 2–1 | 0–3 | 0–0 | 5–0 | 3–0 | 3–0 | 4–0 | 0–1 | 1–0 | 3–1 | 2–1 | 3–3 | 1–2 | 0–0 | — | 1–2 | 2–2 |
| Wadi Degla | 1–2 | 2–2 | 1–2 | 1–2 | 1–3 | 1–1 | 3–0 | 1–3 | 1–1 | 1–2 | 0–0 | 2–1 | 0–2 | 1–1 | 0–1 | 0–0 | — | 2–4 |
| Zamalek | 0–0 | 2–1 | 2–1 | 1–1 | 3–0 | 2–1 | 3–1 | 5–1 | 2–0 | 4–1 | 2–1 | 0–1 | 2–0 | 3–3 | 1–0 | 3–0 | 2–1 | — |

Source: Soccerway
Legend: Blue = home team win; Yellow = draw; Red = away team win.
For upcoming matches, an "a" indicates there is an article about the rivalry between the two participants.

== Season statistics ==
=== Scoring ===
- First goal of the season:
  (Ghana) Emmanuel Banahene for Al Ittihad against Al Mokawloon Al Arab (31 July 2018)
- Last goal of the season:
  (Tunisia) Ali Maâloul for Al Ahly against Zamalek (28 July 2019)

=== Top goalscorers ===
| Rank | Player | Club | Goals |
|---|---|---|---|
| 1 | (Egypt) Ahmed Ali | Al Mokawloon Al Arab | 18 |
| 2 | (Egypt) Mahmoud Alaa | Zamalek | 15 |
| 3 | (Egypt) Khaled Kamar | Al Ittihad | 14 |
| 4 | (Egypt) Salah Amin | Nogoom | 13 |
| 4 | (Burkina Faso) Eric Traoré (Note: Eric Traoré transferred from Misr Lel Makkasa to Pyramids during the winter transfer window.) | Misr Lel Makkasa/Pyramids | 13 |
| 6 | (Egypt) Mostafa Mohamed | Tala'ea El Gaish | 12 |
| 6 | (Egypt) Paulo | El Dakhleya | 12 |
| 8 | (Ghana) John Antwi | Misr Lel Makkasa | 11 |
| 8 | (Egypt) Kahraba | Zamalek | 11 |
| 8 | (Senegal) Ibrahima Ndiaye | Wadi Degla | 11 |

=== Hat-tricks ===
| Player | For | Against | Result | Date | Ref |
|---|---|---|---|---|---|
| (Egypt) Mahmoud Alaa | Zamalek | Tala'ea El Gaish | 3–0 (H) | 13 September 2018 | |
| (Egypt) Ahmed Kabouria | Tala'ea El Gaish | El Gouna | 5–0 (H) | 7 November 2018 | |
| (Ghana) John Antwi | Misr Lel Makkasa | ENPPI | 4–3 (H) | 25 November 2018 | |
| (Burkina Faso) Eric Traoré | Pyramids | Al Ittihad | 3–2 (A) | 11 April 2019 | |

Note

(H) – Home; (A) – Away

=== Top assists ===
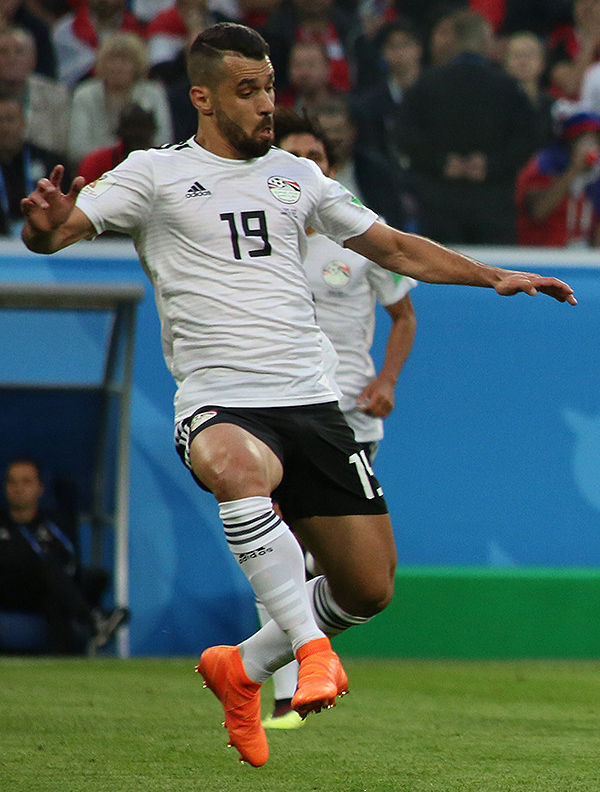
Despite joining Pyramids during the winter transfer window, Abdallah El Said assisted 8 goals for the club and finished as joint second top playmaker.

| Rank | Player | Club | Assists |
|---|---|---|---|
| 1 | (Egypt) Mahmoud Kahraba | Zamalek | 10 |
| 2 | (Colombia) Luis Hinestroza | Al Mokawloon Al Arab | 8 |
| 2 | (Egypt) Abdallah El Said (Note: Abdallah El Said transferred from Al Ahli Saudi to Pyramids during the winter transfer window.) | Pyramids | 8 |
| 4 | (Ivory Coast) Razack Cissé | Al Ittihad | 7 |
| 4 | (Tunisia) Ali Maâloul | Al Ahly | 7 |
| 4 | (Cameroon) Jonathan Ngwem | El Gouna | 7 |
| 4 | (Egypt) Ahmed Shedid | El Entag El Harby | 7 |
| 8 | (Egypt) Mohamed Bassiouny | ENPPI | 6 |
| 8 | (Angola) Geraldo (Note: Geraldo transferred from 1º de Agosto to Al Ahly during the winter transfer window.) | Al Ahly | 6 |
| 8 | (Brazil) Keno | Pyramids | 6 |
| 8 | (Egypt) Mohamed Magdy | Pyramids | 6 |
| 8 | (Egypt) El Sayed Salem (Note: El Sayed Salem transferred from Wadi Degla to Al Ittihad during the winter transfer window.) | Wadi Degla/Al Ittihad | 6 |
| 8 | (Namibia) Benson Shilongo (Note: Benson Shilongo transferred from Smouha to Ismaily during the winter transfer window.) | Smouha/Ismaily | 6 |
| 8 | (Egypt) Mahmoud Wahid (Note: Mahmoud Wahid transferred from Misr Lel Makkasa to Al Ahly during the winter transfer window.) | Misr Lel Makkasa/Al Ahly | 6 |

=== Clean sheets ===
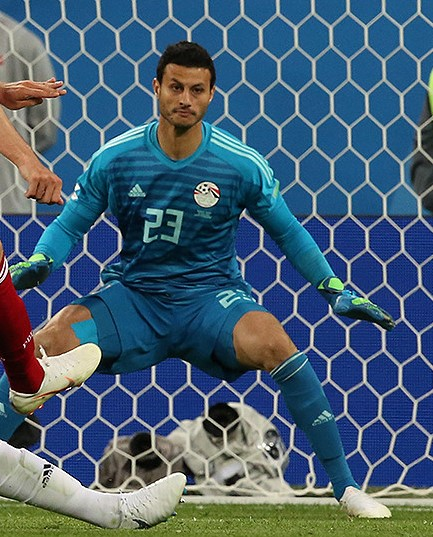
Mohamed El Shenawy won the goalkeeper of the season award after keeping 13 clean sheets for Al Ahly.

| Rank | Player | Club | Clean sheets |
|---|---|---|---|
| 1 | (Egypt) Mohamed El Shenawy | Al Ahly | 13 |
| 2 | (Egypt) Ahmed Adel | Misr Lel Makkasa | 11 |
| 2 | (Egypt) Mohamed Bassam | Tala'ea El Gaish | 11 |
| 2 | (Egypt) Ahmed Masoud | Al Masry | 11 |
| 5 | (Egypt) Mohamed Abou Gabal | Smouha | 10 |
| 5 | (Egypt) Mohamed Fawzy | Ismaily | 10 |
| 5 | (Egypt) Mahmoud Genesh | Zamalek | 10 |
| 5 | (Egypt) Ahmed El Shenawy | Pyramids | 10 |
| 9 | (Egypt) Mohamed Abou El Naga | Petrojet | 8 |
| 9 | (Egypt) Ahmed El Saadani | Haras El Hodoud | 8 |

== Monthly awards ==
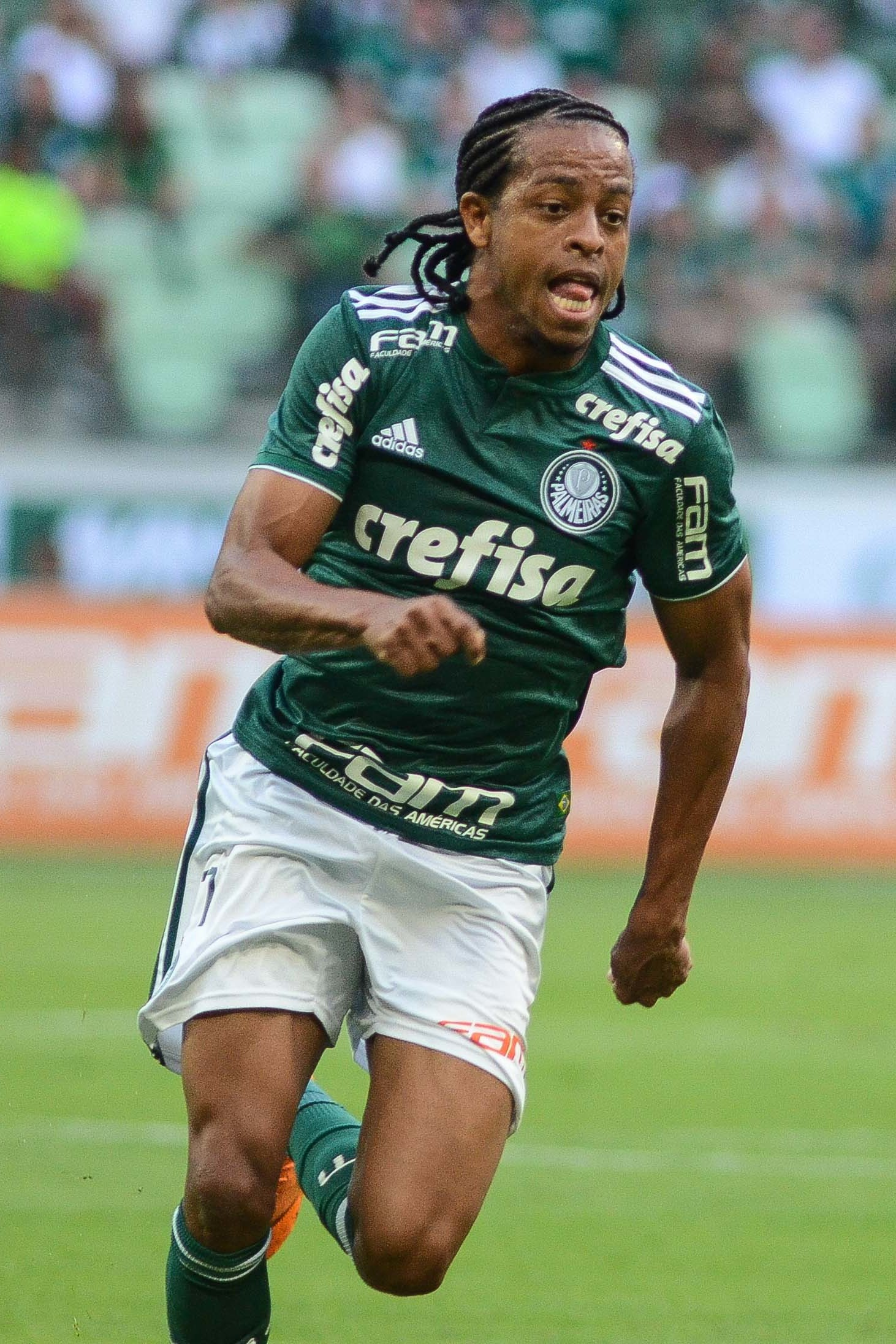
Keno was the first player to receive the reward in August 2018.

| Month | Player of the Month | | Reference |
| Month | Player | Club | Reference |
|---|---|---|---|
| August | (Brazil) Keno | Pyramids | |
| September | (Egypt) Mahmoud Alaa | Zamalek | |
| October | (Ivory Coast) Razack Cissé | Al Ittihad | |
| November | (Egypt) Mahmoud Kahraba | Zamalek | |
| December | (Egypt) Ahmed El Sheikh | Al Ahly | |
| January | (Egypt) Abdallah El Said | Pyramids | |
| February | (Syria) Omar Kharbin | Pyramids | |
| March | (Egypt) Khaled Kamar | Al Ittihad | |
| April | (Egypt) El Sayed Farid | Smouha | |
| May | (Egypt) Mostafa Mohamed | Tala'ea El Gaish | |

== Number of teams by governorate ==
| Number of teams | Governorate | Team(s) |
|---|---|---|
| 8 | Cairo | Al Ahly, El Dakhleya, ENPPI, El Entag El Harby, Al Mokawloon Al Arab, Pyramids, Tala'ea El Gaish and Wadi Degla |
| 3 | Alexandria | Haras El Hodoud, Al Ittihad and Smouha |
| 2 | Giza | Nogoom and Zamalek |
| 1 | Faiyum | Misr Lel Makkasa |
| 1 | Ismailia | Ismaily |
| 1 | Port Said | Al Masry |
| 1 | Red Sea | El Gouna |
| 1 | Suez | Petrojet |
