= 2023–24 Egyptian Premier League =

Egyptian Premier League
- Season: 2023–24
- Dates: 18 September 2023 – 18 August 2024
- Champions: Al Ahly; 44th title
- Relegated: Baladiyat El Mahalla; Al Mokawloon Al Arab; El Dakhleya
- Champions League: Al Ahly; Pyramids
- Confederation Cup: Zamalek; Al Masry
- Matches: 306
- Goals: 730 (2.39 per match)
- Top goalscorer: Wessam Abou Ali (18 goals)
- Best goalkeeper: Ahmed El Shenawy (14 clean sheets)
- Biggest home win: National Bank of Egypt 5–0 Baladiyat El Mahalla (24 June 2024)
- Biggest away win: Al Masry 0–4 National Bank of Egypt (5 November 2023); El Gouna 0–4 Pyramids (9 April 2024); National Bank of Egypt 1–5 ENPPI (5 May 2024); Tala'ea El Gaish 0–4 Al Ahly (1 July 2024); Al Ittihad 0–4 Pyramids (8 July 2024)
- Highest scoring: Baladiyat El Mahalla 3–5 Ceramica Cleopatra (23 February 2024)
- Longest winning run: 21 matches Al Ahly
- Longest unbeaten run: 22 matches Al Ahly
- Longest winless run: 22 matches El Dakhleya
- Longest losing run: 5 matches National Bank of Egypt; Baladiyat El Mahalla; El Dakhleya
- (Note: Total goals scored include two awarded goals)

The 2023–24 Egyptian Premier League was the 65th season of the Egyptian Premier League, the top professional league for association football clubs in the Egyptian football league system, since its establishment in 1948. Fixtures for the 2023–24 season were announced on 11 September 2023. Al Ahly were the defending champions.

The season started on 18 September 2023, and concluded on 18 August 2024.

Al Ahly successfully defended their title and won the league on 8 August 2024 following a 1–0 away win against Smouha, winning a record-extending 44th league title.

== Format ==
The league consist of 18 teams in one group. All teams play each other twice, home and away, for a total of thirty-four matches. The first-placed team is crowned champions of the league, and qualify for the CAF Champions League alongside the runners-up. The third-placed team qualify for the CAF Confederation Cup, while the bottom three teams face relegation to the Egyptian Second Division A.

== Teams ==
Locations of the 2023–24 Egyptian Premier League teams
Locations of Egyptian Premier League teams from Greater Cairo (Cairo and Giza)

A total of 18 teams participate in the 2023–24 edition of the Egyptian Premier League.

The first team to earn promotion to the league was ZED, who were promoted on 9 June 2023 after securing first place in Second Division Group B following a 3–1 win against Wadi Degla. This was the second time in the club's history to reach the Premier League, with the first time being in 2019 when the club was known as FC Masr.

The second team to promote to the Premier League was Baladiyat El Mahalla, who were promoted to the league as Group C winners following a 4–0 away win against promotion-rivals Dikernis on 14 June 2023; ending the club's absence from the top tier that lasted 15 years.

The third and last team to earn promotion was El Gouna, who returned to the top flight immediately after getting relegated in 2022. Their promotion was secured on 15 June 2023, following a 2–1 away win against Muslim Youths (Qena) that secured Group A first place with just one point above the runners-up La Viena.

The first team to be relegated from the league was Haras El Hodoud, who suffered an immediate return to the second tier following a 3–0 defeat against Al Ahly on 22 June 2023 that confirmed the relegation of the Alexandria-based side.

The second team to be relegated was Ghazl El Mahalla, whose stay in the top flight came to an end after three seasons, following a 2–1 defeat against already-relegated side Haras El Hodoud on 14 July 2023.

The third and last team to be relegated was Aswan, another team that suffered an immediate return to the second tier, after losing 4–2 on home ground against El Dakhleya on 14 July 2023. El Dakhleya survived relegation thanks to this win.

=== Stadiums and locations ===
Team	Location	Stadium (Note: Main stadiums for the 2023–24 season are listed only. Clubs are allowed to play selected matches at alternative venues; whether due to unavailability, security concerns, or other reasons. For example, Al Ittihad, a team from Alexandria, may play some home games at Borg El Arab Stadium, instead of their regular home stadium, Alexandria Stadium.)	Capacity
Al Ahly	Gezira	Cairo International Stadium	75,000
Baladiyat El Mahalla	El Mahalla El Kubra	Ghazl El Mahalla Stadium	14,564
Ceramica Cleopatra	6th of October	Osman Ahmed Osman Stadium	35,000
El Dakhleya	El Nozha	Al Salam Stadium	30,000
ENPPI	New Cairo	Petrosport Stadium	16,000
El Gouna	El Gouna	Khaled Bichara Stadium	12,000
Ismaily	Ismailia (Sheikh Zayed)	Ismailia Stadium	18,525
Al Ittihad	Shatby	Alexandria Stadium	19,676
Al Masry	Port Said (Al Dawahy)	Borg El Arab Stadium	86,000
Modern Future	Mokattam	Cairo International Stadium	75,000
Al Mokawloon Al Arab	Abageyah	Osman Ahmed Osman Stadium	35,000
National Bank of Egypt	Agouza	Al Salam Stadium	30,000
Pharco	Amreya	Borg El Arab Stadium	86,000
Pyramids	New Cairo	30 June Stadium	30,000
Smouha	Smouha	Alexandria Stadium	19,676
Tala'ea El Gaish	Al Waili	Gehaz El Reyada Stadium	20,000
Zamalek	Mit Okba	Cairo International Stadium	75,000
ZED	Sheikh Zayed City	Cairo International Stadium	75,000

=== Personnel and kits ===
Team	Manager	Captain	Kit manufacturer	Kit sponsor(s)
Al Ahly	(Switzerland) Marcel Koller	(Egypt) Mohamed El Shenawy	Adidas	Etisalat, FAB Misr
Baladiyat El Mahalla	(Egypt) Mohamed Mekky	(Egypt) Hossam Hassan II	Curva	
Ceramica Cleopatra	(Egypt) Ayman El Ramadi	(Egypt) Mohamed Ibrahim	Puma	Ceramica Cleopatra Group
El Dakhleya	(Egypt) Eid Maraziq	(Egypt) Abdel Aziz El Sayed	Adidas	
ENPPI	(Egypt) Sayed Yassin	(Egypt) Abdel Aziz El Balouti	Kelme	
El Gouna	(Egypt) Alaa Abdel Aal	(Egypt) Nour El Sayed	Adidas	
Ismaily	(Egypt) Ehab Galal	(Egypt) Emad Hamdy	Copa	
Al Ittihad	(Egypt) Ahmed Sary	(Egypt) Khaled El Ghandour	Kelme	
Al Masry	(Egypt) Ali Maher	(Egypt) Amr Moussa	Zat Outfit	Neverland Resort
Modern Future	(Egypt) Talaat Youssef	(Egypt) Mahmoud Genish	Umbro	MTI University
Al Mokawloon Al Arab	(Egypt) Talaat Moharram (caretaker)	(Egypt) Mahmoud Abou El Saoud	Nike	
National Bank of Egypt	(Egypt) Tarek Mostafa	(Egypt) Mahmoud Kaoud	Nike	National Bank of Egypt
Pharco	(Egypt) Ahmed Khattab	(Egypt) Ramy Sabry	Nike	RANI-F
Pyramids	(Croatia) Krunoslav Jurčić	(Egypt) Ahmed El Shenawy (Note: Following the departure of Pyramids' captain, Abdallah El Said, to Zamalek during the January 2024 transfer window, vice-captain Ahmed El Shenawy was announced as the new club captain.)	Puma	MyWhoosh
Smouha	(Egypt) Ahmed Samy	(Egypt) Hossam Hassan I	Nike	
Tala'ea El Gaish	(Egypt) Abdel Hamid Bassiouny	(Egypt) Khaled Stouhi	Adidas	
Zamalek	(Portugal) José Gomes	(Egypt) Shikabala	Tempo	Nile Developments, Pasta Regina
ZED	(Egypt) Magdy Abdel Aati	(Egypt) Mohamed Samir	Umbro	ORA, Emirates NBD

=== Managerial changes ===
Team	Outgoing manager	Manner of departure	Date of vacancy	Position in table	Incoming manager	Date of appointment
El Gouna	(Egypt) Ahmed Mostafa	End of contract	16 June 2023	Pre-season	(Egypt) Alaa Abdel Aal	31 July 2023
Ceramica Cleopatra	(Egypt) Helmy Toulan	Mutual consent	16 July 2023	Pre-season	(Egypt) Ayman El Ramadi	19 July 2023
Al Ittihad	(Serbia) Zoran Manojlović	Mutual consent	17 July 2023	Pre-season	(Egypt) Tarek El Ashry	21 July 2023
Modern Future	(Egypt) Ali Maher	End of contract	26 July 2023	Pre-season	(Portugal) Ricardo Formosinho	16 August 2023
Ismaily	(Egypt) Hamza El Gamal	End of contract	26 July 2023	Pre-season	(Egypt) Ehab Galal	7 August 2023
Al Masry	(Egypt) Mimi Abdel Razek	End of contract	26 July 2023	Pre-season	(Egypt) Ali Maher	27 July 2023
El Dakhleya	(Egypt) Alaa Abdel Aal	Resigned	27 July 2023	Pre-season	(Egypt) Haitham Gabriel (caretaker)	27 July 2023
El Dakhleya	(Egypt) Haitham Gabriel	End of caretaker spell	8 August 2023	Pre-season	(Egypt) Mimi Abdel Razek	8 August 2023
Pharco	(Portugal) Bruno Romão	Mutual consent	10 October 2023	17th	(Egypt) Khaled Galal	10 October 2023
El Dakhleya	(Egypt) Mimi Abdel Razek	Resigned	20 October 2023	13th	(Egypt) Hany Abdel Baqi (caretaker)	22 October 2023
National Bank of Egypt	(Cyprus) Nikodimos Papavasiliou	Sacked	31 October 2023	18th	(Egypt) Tarek Mostafa	31 October 2023
Zamalek	(Colombia) Juan Carlos Osorio	Sacked	6 November 2023	9th	(Egypt) Motamed Gamal (caretaker)	6 November 2023
El Dakhleya	(Egypt) Hany Abdel Baqi	End of caretaker spell	10 November 2023	16th	(Egypt) Haitham Shaaban	10 November 2023
Al Mokawloon Al Arab	(Egypt) Shawky Gharieb	Resigned	9 December 2023	17th	(Egypt) Talaat Moharram (caretaker)	9 December 2023
Pharco	(Egypt) Khaled Galal	Resigned	27 December 2023	18th	(Egypt) Ahmed Khattab	30 December 2023
Al Mokawloon Al Arab	(Egypt) Talaat Moharram	End of caretaker spell	16 January 2024	16th	(Egypt) Mohamed Ouda	16 January 2024
El Dakhleya	(Egypt) Haitham Shaaban	Signed by (Iraq) Al Karkh	18 January 2024	17th	(Egypt) Amr Hassan (caretaker)	18 January 2024
Modern Future	(Portugal) Ricardo Formosinho	Sacked	26 January 2024	11th	(Egypt) Hossam Hassan	28 January 2024
Zamalek	(Egypt) Motamed Gamal	End of caretaker spell	1 February 2024	10th	(Portugal) José Gomes	1 February 2024
ENPPI	(Egypt) Tamer Mostafa	Resigned	2 February 2024	2nd	(Egypt) Sayed Yassin	3 February 2024
Pyramids	(Portugal) Jaime Pacheco	Sacked	4 February 2024	4th	(Egypt) Mahmoud Fathalla (caretaker)	4 February 2024
Modern Future	(Egypt) Hossam Hassan	Signed by Egypt	6 February 2024	11th	(Egypt) Tamer Mostafa	8 February 2024
Pyramids	(Egypt) Mahmoud Fathalla	End of caretaker spell	7 February 2024	4th	(Croatia) Krunoslav Jurčić	7 February 2024
El Dakhleya	(Egypt) Amr Hassan	End of caretaker spell	14 March 2024	18th	(Egypt) Ahmed Koshary	14 March 2024
Al Mokawloon Al Arab	(Egypt) Mohamed Ouda	Resigned	21 April 2024	17th	(Egypt) Motamed Gamal	22 April 2024
El Dakhleya	(Egypt) Ahmed Koshary	Resigned	11 May 2024	18th	(Egypt) Eid Maraziq	12 May 2024
Modern Future	(Egypt) Tamer Mostafa	Resigned	12 May 2024	11th	(Egypt) Talaat Youssef	12 May 2024
Al Ittihad	(Egypt) Tarek El Ashry	Resigned	24 June 2024	9th	(Egypt) Ahmed Sary	25 June 2024
Baladiyat El Mahalla	(Egypt) Ahmed Abdel Raouf	Sacked	24 June 2024	16th	(Egypt) Ahmed Koshary	24 June 2024
Al Mokawloon Al Arab	(Egypt) Motamed Gamal	Resigned	28 June 2024	18th	(Egypt) Emad El Nahhas	29 June 2024
Baladiyat El Mahalla	(Egypt) Ahmed Koshary	Resigned	23 July 2024	16th	(Egypt) Mohamed Mekky	24 July 2024
Al Mokawloon Al Arab	(Egypt) Emad El Nahhas	Resigned	5 August 2024	17th	(Egypt) Talaat Moharram (caretaker)	5 August 2024

== League table ==
Pos	Team	Pld	W	D	L	GF	GA	GD	Pts	Qualification or relegation
1	Al Ahly (C)	34	27	4	3	75	28	+47	85	Qualification for the Champions League second round (Note: Al Ahly qualified for the Champions League second round by winning the 2023–24 CAF Champions League.)
2	Pyramids	34	24	7	3	62	27	+35	79	Qualification for the Champions League first round
3	Zamalek	34	17	8	9	53	37	+16	56 (Note: Zamalek were deducted three points for refusing to play their away fixture against Al Ahly, scheduled to be played on 25 June 2024.)	Qualification for the Confederation Cup second round (Note: Zamalek qualified for the Confederation Cup second round by winning the 2023–24 CAF Confederation Cup.)
4	Al Masry	34	16	7	11	41	39	+2	55	Qualification for the Confederation Cup second round (Note: The league was not finished by the CAF deadline for associations to submit teams participating in next season's CAF competitions. As a result, Al Masry, who finished the first half of the season at third place (and were also at third place by the time of the draw) qualified for the CAF Confederation Cup.)
5	Modern Future	34	14	12	8	40	28	+12	54 (Note: Head-to-head points: Modern Future 4, Smouha 1.)	
6	Smouha	34	15	9	10	39	35	+4	54	
7	ZED	34	13	12	9	48	35	+13	51	
8	Ceramica Cleopatra	34	12	10	12	51	42	+9	46	
9	ENPPI	34	11	12	11	38	37	+1	45	
10	Tala'ea El Gaish	34	10	12	12	30	40	−10	42	
11	Al Ittihad	34	9	14	11	30	42	−12	41	
12	El Gouna	34	9	12	13	32	44	−12	39	
13	National Bank of Egypt	34	9	9	16	46	45	+1	36	
14	Ismaily	34	7	12	15	33	43	−10	33 (Note: Tied on head-to-head points (3). Head-to-head goal difference: Ismaily +1, Pharco –1.)	
15	Pharco	34	6	15	13	32	43	−11	33	
16	Baladiyat El Mahalla (R)	34	7	7	20	31	65	−34	28	Relegation to Second Division A
17	Al Mokawloon Al Arab (R)	34	5	11	18	32	57	−25	26	Relegation to Second Division A
18	El Dakhleya (R)	34	3	11	20	17	43	−26	20	Relegation to Second Division A

Source: Soccerway
Rules for classification: 1) Points; 2) Head-to-head points; 3) Head-to-head goal difference; 4) Goal difference; 5) Goals scored; 6) Play-off tie.
(Note: Head-to-head records are used for final standings only)
(C) Champions; (R) Relegated

== Results ==
Home \ Away	AHL	BMH	CER	DKH	ENP	GOU	ISM	ITH	MAS	MOF	MOK	NBE	PHA	PYR	SMO	TGS	ZAM	ZED
Al Ahly	—	5–1	4–1	4–1	2–2	3–0	3–1	4–1	4–0	1–2	4–0	1–0	2–1	3–2	0–0	2–0	2–0 (Note: Awarded.)	2–1
Baladiyat El Mahalla	1–2	—	3–5	1–0	0–0	1–2	4–2	2–2	0–1	1–0	2–0	0–2	3–2	0–2	0–2	0–2	2–2	0–3
Ceramica Cleopatra	1–2	4–0	—	4–0	4–2	1–1	1–0	1–1	1–1	0–1	2–0	1–0	1–1	2–0	0–1	2–1	1–2	1–1
El Dakhleya	1–2	0–0	1–3	—	1–0	0–0	0–0	0–1	1–3	1–1	3–0	0–0	1–1	0–2	0–0	0–1	1–2	1–0
ENPPI	1–1	3–0	3–2	0–0	—	1–0	1–0	1–2	1–2	0–1	2–2	3–1	1–1	0–1	0–0	0–0	2–1	1–4
El Gouna	1–1	2–1	0–0	2–0	1–2	—	0–0	2–1	2–2	0–2	1–2	1–1	1–2	0–4	1–0	0–0	3–2	0–1
Ismaily	1–2	0–1	2–1	1–0	2–2	1–1	—	3–1	0–1	1–1	1–1	2–1	0–1	0–2	2–1	2–3	0–0	1–2
Al Ittihad	0–1	2–1	1–0	1–1	0–0	2–2	1–1	—	0–2	0–0	3–2	0–0	3–1	0–4	0–2	2–2	0–2	0–0
Al Masry	0–1	3–0	0–2	1–0	0–0	2–1	1–1	2–3	—	1–2	1–1	0–4	1–0	0–1	2–0	1–0	1–0	0–1
Modern Future	1–2	1–0	1–1	2–1	0–1	3–1	0–1	1–1	0–0	—	2–2	1–1	2–0	0–1	3–0	0–0	0–2	0–0
Al Mokawloon Al Arab	1–2	0–2	1–1	0–0	0–1	0–1	1–1	0–1	0–1	1–2	—	1–4	1–1	0–2	0–1	3–1	2–1	3–3
National Bank of Egypt	4–3	5–0	0–1	1–0	1–5	2–3	2–2	0–0	5–2	1–2	3–1	—	0–0	0–1	1–2	0–1	1–2	1–1
Pharco	1–2	1–0	2–2	2–0	0–0	0–1	0–2	1–0	1–2	0–2	1–1	2–1	—	2–2	1–1	1–1	1–1	1–2
Pyramids	0–1	2–2	2–1	1–0	1–0	1–0	2–1	1–0	3–2	2–1	3–1	3–2	1–1	—	3–0	0–0	2–2	2–1
Smouha	0–1	4–0	1–0	3–2	2–0	1–1	2–0	0–1	1–0	1–1	2–1	1–1	2–1	2–3 (Note: On 28 June 2024, the match involving Smouha and Pyramids was abandoned in the 49th minute after a fire broke out in the stadium, whilst the scoreline was 1–1. The match was resumed on 2 July 2024.)	—	1–0	1–0	1–2
Tala'ea El Gaish	0–4	1–0	1–0	0–0	1–0	1–1	1–1	0–0	0–2	0–2	1–2	2–0	0–0	2–5	2–2	—	1–2	1–0
Zamalek	2–1	0–0	4–2	1–0	4–2	1–0	2–1	3–0	1–2	1–1	1–1	1–0	2–0	1–1	5–1	1–3	—	1–2
ZED	0–1	3–3	2–2	3–1	0–1	3–0	1–0	0–0	2–2	3–2	0–1	0–1	2–2	0–0	1–1	4–1	0–1	—

Source: Soccerway
Legend: Blue = home team win; Yellow = draw; Red = away team win.

== Season statistics ==
- First goal of the season:
  Youssry Wahid for Tala'ea El Gaish against National Bank of Egypt (18 September 2023)
- Last goal of the season:
  (Egypt) Ahmed Yasser Rayyan for Ceramica Cleopatra against ZED (18 August 2024)

=== Top scorers ===
Rank	Player	Club	Goals
1	(Palestine) Wessam Abou Ali	Al Ahly	18
2	(Democratic Republic of the Congo) Fiston Mayele	Pyramids	17
3	(Egypt) Hossam Ashraf	Baladiyat El Mahalla	14
5	(Egypt) Hossam Hassan	Smouha	12
5	(Egypt) Mostafa Ziko	ZED	12
6	(Togo) Yaw Annor (Note: Yaw Annor scored 3 goals for Ismaily, before joining National Bank of Egypt in the January 2024 transfer window.)	Ismaily/National Bank of Egypt	11
6	(Nigeria) Sodiq Awujoola	Ceramica Cleopatra	11
6	(Angola) Mabululu	Al Ittihad	11
6	(Egypt) Mohamed Salem	Al Mokawloon Al Arab	11
10	(Egypt) Shady Hussein	ZED	9
10	(Egypt) Ahmed Yasser Rayyan	Ceramica Cleopatra	9
10	(Egypt) Ahmed Sayed	Zamalek	9

=== Hat-tricks ===
Player	For	Against	Result	Date
(Egypt) Osama Faisal	National Bank of Egypt	Al Masry	4–0 (A)	5 November 2023
(Egypt) Hossam Ghanem	El Gouna	National Bank of Egypt	3–2 (A)	14 December 2023
(Egypt) Mahmoud Kaoud	National Bank of Egypt	Al Mokawloon Al Arab	3–1 (H)	30 December 2023
(Palestine) Wessam Abou Ali	Al Ahly	Al Mokawloon Al Arab	4–0 (H)	4 August 2024
(Democratic Republic of the Congo) Fiston Mayele	Pyramids	Tala'ea El Gaish	5–2 (A)	11 August 2024

=== Top assists ===
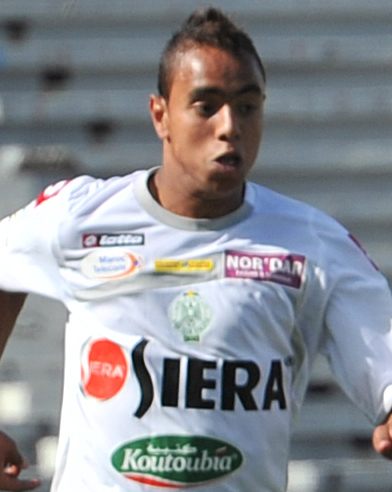
Pyramids' Mohamed Chibi finished as the top playmaker with 9 assists.

Rank	Player	Club	Assists
1	(Morocco) Mohamed Chibi	Pyramids	9
2	(Nigeria) Sodiq Awujoola	Ceramica Cleopatra	7
2	(Egypt) Omar Kamal (Note: Omar Kamal made 1 assist while playing for Modern Future, before joining Al Ahly in the January 2024 transfer window.)	Modern Future/Al Ahly	7
2	(Morocco) Walid El Karti	Pyramids	7
5	(Egypt) Omar Gaber	Zamalek	6
5	(Egypt) Mohamed Hamdy	Pyramids	6
5	(Egypt) Mohamed Ibrahim	Ceramica Cleopatra	6
5	(Cameroon) Jonathan Ngwem	Modern Future	6
5	(Egypt) Hussein El Shahat	Al Ahly	6
10	(Togo) Yaw Annor (Note: Yaw Annor made 2 assists while playing for Ismaily, before joining National Bank of Egypt in the January 2024 transfer window.)	Ismaily/National Bank of Egypt	5
10	(Egypt) Emam Ashour	Al Ahly	5
10	(Egypt) Karim El Deeb	Al Ittihad	5
10	(Egypt) Ali Fawzi	ENPPI	5
10	(Algeria) Ahmed Kendouci	Ceramica Cleopatra	5
10	(Egypt) Mohamed Magdy	Al Ahly	5
10	(Democratic Republic of the Congo) Fiston Mayele	Pyramids	5
10	(Egypt) Ahmed Meteb	Tala'ea El Gaish	5
10	(Egypt) Ayman Moka	El Gouna	5
10	(Egypt) Taher Mohamed	Al Ahly	5
10	(Morocco) Abdelkabir El Ouadi	Modern Future	5
10	(Burkina Faso) Blati Touré	Pyramids	5
10	(Ghana) Issahaku Yakubu	National Bank of Egypt	5

=== Clean sheets ===
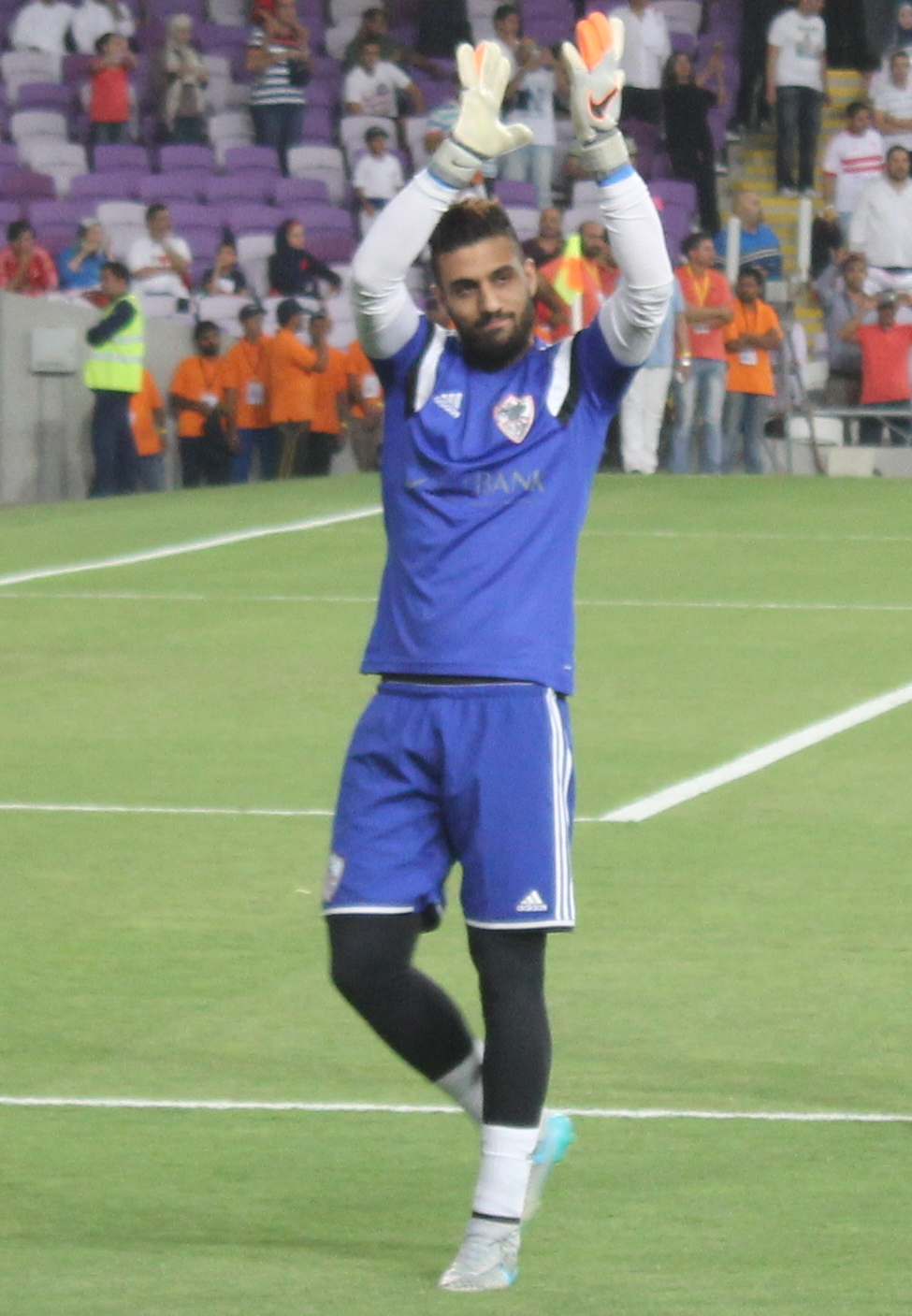
Ahmed El Shenawy kept 14 clean sheets for Pyramids, more than any other goalkeeper.

Rank	Player	Club	Clean sheets
1	(Egypt) Ahmed El Shenawy	Pyramids	14
2	(Egypt) El Hany Soliman	Smouha	12
3	(Egypt) Mohamed Shaaban	Tala'ea El Gaish	10
3	(Egypt) El Mahdy Soliman	Al Ittihad	10
5	(Egypt) Mahmoud Gad	Al Masry	9
5	(Egypt) Abdel Rahman Samir	ENPPI	9
7	(Egypt) Mohamed Bassam	Ceramica Cleopatra	8
7	(Egypt) Mohamed El Shenawy	Al Ahly	8
9	(Egypt) Mahmoud Hamdy	Modern Future	7
9	(Egypt) Ali Lotfi	ZED	7

=== Team of the season ===
Pos.	Player	Team
GK	(Egypt) Mostafa Shobeir	Al Ahly
DF	(Morocco) Mohamed Chibi	Pyramids
DF	(Tunisia) Hamza Mathlouthi	Zamalek
DF	(Egypt) Mohamed Abdelmonem	Al Ahly
DF	(Tunisia) Ali Maâloul	Al Ahly
MF	(Egypt) Mohanad Lasheen	Pyramids
MF	(Egypt) Marwan Attia	Al Ahly
MF	(Egypt) Emam Ashour	Al Ahly
FW	(Egypt) Zizo	Zamalek
FW	(Palestine) Wessam Abou Ali	Al Ahly
FW	(Egypt) Hussein El Shahat	Al Ahly

== Number of teams by governorate ==
Number of teams	Governorate	Team(s)
7	Cairo	Al Ahly, El Dakhleya, ENPPI, Modern Future, Al Mokawloon Al Arab, Pyramids and Tala'ea El Gaish
4	Giza	Ceramica Cleopatra, National Bank of Egypt, Zamalek and ZED
3	Alexandria	Al Ittihad, Pharco and Smouha
1	Gharbia	Baladiyat El Mahalla
1	Ismailia	Ismaily
1	Port Said	Al Masry
1	Red Sea	El Gouna
