= 2022–23 Egyptian Premier League =

Egyptian Premier League
- Season: 2022–23
- Dates: 18 October 2022 – 26 July 2023
- Champions: Al Ahly (43rd title)
- Relegated: Aswan; Ghazl El Mahalla; Haras El Hodoud
- Champions League: Al Ahly; Pyramids
- Confederation Cup: Zamalek; Future
- Matches: 306
- Goals: 657 (2.15 per match)
- Top goalscorer: Mabululu (16 goals)
- Best goalkeeper: Mohamed El Shenawy
- Biggest home win: Zamalek 4–0 Haras El Hodoud (20 December 2022); Pyramids 4–0 Ghazl El Mahalla (7 January 2023)
- Biggest away win: Tala'ea El Gaish 0–4 Zamalek (7 December 2022)
- Highest scoring: Tala'ea El Gaish 3–4 Al Ittihad (27 February 2023); Smouha 4–3 El Dakhleya (9 April 2023); Pyramids 5–2 Smouha (28 June 2023)
- Longest winning run: 6 matches Al Ahly
- Longest unbeaten run: 32 matches Al Ahly
- Longest winless run: 15 matches Tala'ea El Gaish
- Longest losing run: 6 matches Haras El Hodoud

The 2022–23 Egyptian Premier League was the 64th season of the Egyptian Premier League, the top professional league for association football clubs in the Egyptian football league system, since its establishment in 1948. Fixtures for the 2022–23 season were announced on 9 October 2022. Zamalek were the defending champions.

The season started on 18 October 2022, and concluded on 26 July 2023.

Al Ahly secured the title on 10 July 2023, winning their 43rd league title.

== Decisions ==
Due to some clubs' participation in continental competitions, the league's start date was delayed by 48 hours. A total of 6,000 spectators will be permitted, up from 2,000 at the start of the previous season. Matches were played during the World Cup. The league was suspended from 3 November through 18 November owing to the country hosting the 2022 United Nations Climate Change Conference.

== Teams ==
Aswan was the first team to be promoted on 10 May 2022 after a one-year absence. On the same day, El Dakhleya returned to the top flight after a three-year absence. The final team, Haras El Hodoud, won promotion on 13 May, after a two-year absence. They replaced Eastern Company, El Gouna, and Misr Lel Makkasa.

=== Stadiums and locations ===
Location of teams in 2022–23 Premier League

| Team | Location | Stadium | Capacity |
|---|---|---|---|
| Al Ahly | Cairo | Al Ahly WE Al Salam Stadium; Cairo International Stadium | 30,000; 75,000 |
| Aswan | Aswan | Aswan Stadium | 11,000 |
| Ceramica Cleopatra | Cairo | Osman Ahmed Osman Stadium | 35,000 |
| El Dakhleya | Cairo | Police Academy Stadium | 12,000 |
| ENPPI | New Cairo | Petro Sport Stadium | 16,000 |
| Future | Cairo | Al Salam Stadium | 30,000 |
| Ghazl El Mahalla | El Mahalla El Kubra | Ghazl El Mahalla Stadium | 20,000 |
| Haras El Hodoud | Alexandria | Haras El Hodoud Stadium | 22,000 |
| Ismaily | Ismailia | Ismailia Stadium | 30,000 |
| Al Ittihad | Alexandria | Alexandria Stadium | 20,000 |
| Al Masry | Port Said | Al Masry Club Stadium; Borg El Arab Stadium | 18,000; 86,000 |
| Al Mokawloon Al Arab | Cairo | Osman Ahmed Osman Stadium | 35,000 |
| National Bank | Cairo | Cairo International Stadium | 75,000 |
| Pharco | Alexandria | Alexandria Stadium | 20,000 |
| Pyramids | Cairo | 30 June Stadium | 30,000 |
| Smouha | Alexandria | Alexandria Stadium | 20,000 |
| Tala'ea El Gaish | Cairo | Gehaz El Reyada Stadium | 20,000 |
| Zamalek | Cairo | Cairo International Stadium | 75,000 |

=== Managerial changes ===
| Team | Outgoing manager | Manner of departure | Date of vacancy | Position in table | Incoming manager | Date of appointment |
|---|---|---|---|---|---|---|
| Ismaily | (Egypt) Hamza El-Gamal | Mutual consent | 29 August 2022 | Pre-season | (Spain) Juan Carlos Garrido | 20 September 2022 |
| Al Masry | (Egypt) Hossam Hassan | End of contract | 31 August 2022 | Pre-season | (Egypt) Ehab Galal | 8 September 2022 |
| Al Ahly | (Portugal) Ricardo Soares | Sacked | 31 August 2022 | Pre-season | (Switzerland) Marcel Koller | 9 September 2022 |
| Al Ittihad | (Egypt) Mohamed Omar El-Zeer | End of interim spell | 4 September 2022 | Pre-season | (Serbia) Zoran Manojlović | 6 September 2022 |
| Ghazl El Mahalla | (Egypt) Mostafa Abdo | Resigned | 12 September 2022 | Pre-season | (Cyprus) Nikodimos Papavasiliou | 14 September 2022 |
| ENPPI | (Brazil) Jorvan Vieira | Mutual consent | 17 September 2022 | Pre-season | (Egypt) Ahmed Koshary | 17 September 2022 |
| Aswan | (Egypt) Rabie Yassin | Resigned | 29 October 2022 | 18th | (Egypt) Ayman El Ramady | 6 November 2022 |
| Tala'ea El Gaish | (Egypt) Alaa Abdel Aal | Sacked | 2 November 2022 | 8th | (Egypt) Mohamed Youssef | 3 November 2022 |
| National Bank | (Egypt) Khaled Galal | Sacked | 1 December 2022 | 8th | (Egypt) Helmy Toulan | 1 December 2022 |
| Al Masry | (Egypt) Ehab Galal | Sacked | 1 December 2022 | 9th | (Egypt) Hossam Hassan | 14 December 2022 |
| Ismaily | (Spain) Juan Carlos Garrido | Sacked | 9 December 2022 | 16th | (Egypt) Ayman El-Gamal (caretaker) | 9 December 2022 |
| Pharco | (Portugal) Nuno Almeida | Sacked | 17 December 2022 | 9th | (Egypt) Ehab Galal | 17 December 2022 |
| ENPPI | (Egypt) Ahmed Koshary | Sacked | 20 December 2022 | 15th | (Egypt) Talaat Youssef | 25 December 2022 |
| Ismaily | (Egypt) Ayman El-Gamal | End of caretaker spell | 27 December 2022 | 16th | (Egypt) Mido | 27 December 2022 |
| Pyramids | (Greece) Takis Gonias | Sacked | 4 January 2023 | 4th | (Portugal) Jaime Pacheco | 5 January 2023 |
| Ghazl El Mahalla | (Cyprus) Nikodimos Papavasiliou | Sacked | 8 January 2023 | 7th | (Egypt) Abdel Baqi Gamal | 8 January 2023 |
| National Bank | (Egypt) Helmy Toulan | Sacked | 11 January 2023 | 13th | (Egypt) Amir Abdel Aziz (caretaker) | 11 January 2023 |
| Zamalek | (Portugal) Jesualdo Ferreira | Sacked | 24 January 2023 | 5th | (Egypt) Osama Nabieh (caretaker) | 24 January 2023 |
| Pharco | (Egypt) Ehab Galal | Resigned | 24 January 2023 | 13th | (Egypt) Tarek El Ashry | 27 January 2023 |
| Ceramica Cleopatra | (Egypt) Ahmed Samy | Sacked | 25 January 2023 | 10th | (Tunisia) Moïne Chaâbani | 27 January 2023 |
| Smouha | (Egypt) Tarek El Ashry | Resigned | 25 January 2023 | 11th | (Egypt) Ahmed Samy | 26 January 2023 |
| National Bank | (Egypt) Amir Abdel Aziz | End of caretaker spell | 26 January 2023 | 16th | (Cyprus) Nikodimos Papavasiliou | 26 January 2023 |
| Zamalek | (Egypt) Osama Nabieh | Mutual consent | 1 February 2023 | 4th | (Portugal) Jesualdo Ferreira | 1 February 2023 |
| Tala'ea El Gaish | (Egypt) Mohamed Youssef | Resigned | 9 February 2023 | 13th | (Egypt) Imad Al-Nahhas | 9 February 2023 |
| Zamalek | (Portugal) Jesualdo Ferreira | Sacked | 22 March 2023 | 5th | (Egypt) Ahmed Abdulmaqsoud (caretaker) | 22 March 2023 |
| Zamalek | (Egypt) Ahmed Abdulmaqsoud | Sacked | 4 April 2023 | 5th | (Egypt) Medhat Abdel-Hady | 6 April 2023 |
| Zamalek | (Egypt) Medhat Abdel-Hady | End of interim spell | 13 April 2023 | 5th | (Colombia) Juan Carlos Osorio | 13 April 2023 |

== Standings ==
=== League table ===
| Pos | Team | Pld | W | D | L | GF | GA | GD | Pts | Qualification or relegation |
|---|---|---|---|---|---|---|---|---|---|---|
| 1 | Al Ahly (C) | 34 | 25 | 8 | 1 | 63 | 13 | +50 | 83 | Qualification for the Champions League second round |
| 2 | Pyramids | 34 | 22 | 7 | 5 | 58 | 24 | +34 | 73 | Qualification for the Champions League second round |
| 3 | Zamalek | 34 | 17 | 9 | 8 | 52 | 36 | +16 | 60 | Qualification for the Confederation Cup second round (Note: Since the 2022–23 Egypt Cup wouldn't finish by the CAF deadline for associations to submit teams participating in next season's African competitions, the spot awarded to the Egypt Cup winners (Confederation Cup first or second round) was passed to the fourth-placed team in the league.) |
| 4 | Future | 34 | 15 | 13 | 6 | 34 | 23 | +11 | 58 | Qualification for the Confederation Cup second round |
| 5 | Al Masry | 34 | 11 | 15 | 8 | 34 | 33 | +1 | 48 | |
| 6 | ENPPI | 34 | 13 | 6 | 15 | 34 | 40 | −6 | 45 | |
| 7 | Al Mokawloon Al Arab | 34 | 9 | 17 | 8 | 35 | 33 | +2 | 44 | |
| 8 | Al Ittihad | 34 | 12 | 7 | 15 | 36 | 43 | −7 | 43 | |
| 9 | Pharco | 34 | 9 | 15 | 10 | 31 | 34 | −3 | 42 (Note: Head-to-head points: Pharco 6, Smouha 0.) | |
| 10 | Smouha | 34 | 10 | 12 | 12 | 36 | 43 | −7 | 42 | |
| 11 | Ismaily | 34 | 9 | 13 | 12 | 35 | 38 | −3 | 40 | |
| 12 | National Bank of Egypt | 34 | 9 | 12 | 13 | 35 | 40 | −5 | 39 | |
| 13 | Ceramica Cleopatra | 34 | 7 | 16 | 11 | 31 | 32 | −1 | 37 | |
| 14 | Tala'ea El Gaish | 34 | 8 | 12 | 14 | 33 | 45 | −12 | 36 | |
| 15 | El Dakhleya | 34 | 7 | 14 | 13 | 32 | 43 | −11 | 35 | |
| 16 | Aswan (R) | 34 | 8 | 9 | 17 | 31 | 45 | −14 | 33 (Note: Tied on head-to-head points (3) and on head-to-head goal difference (0). Overall goal difference: Aswan −14, Ghazl El Mahalla −21.) | Relegation to Second Division A |
| 17 | Ghazl El Mahalla (R) | 34 | 8 | 9 | 17 | 26 | 47 | −21 | 33 | Relegation to Second Division A |
| 18 | Haras El Hodoud (R) | 34 | 5 | 10 | 19 | 21 | 45 | −24 | 25 | Relegation to Second Division A |

Source: Soccerway
Rules for classification: 1) Points; 2) Head-to-head points; 3) Head-to-head goal difference; 4) Goal difference; 5) Goals scored; 6) Play-off.
(C) Champions; (R) Relegated

== Results ==
=== Fixtures and results ===
| Home \ Away | AHL | ASW | CER | DAK | ENP | FUT | GHA | HAR | ISM | ITT | MAS | MOK | NAT | PHA | PYR | SMO | TAL | ZAM |
|---|---|---|---|---|---|---|---|---|---|---|---|---|---|---|---|---|---|---|
| Al Ahly | — | 1–0 | 1–0 | 1–1 | 2–0 | 1–1 | 3–0 | 1–1 | 1–0 | 3–0 | 0–0 | 2–1 | 1–0 | 3–0 | 3–0 | 0–0 | 2–0 | 4–1 |
| Aswan | 0–3 | — | 1–1 | 2–4 | 2–0 | 1–2 | 0–1 | 1–1 | 0–0 | 0–1 | 3–1 | 1–1 | 1–2 | 1–0 | 0–3 | 1–1 | 2–2 | 2–1 |
| Ceramica Cleopatra | 1–1 | 3–2 | — | 0–0 | 0–1 | 2–3 | 0–0 | 2–1 | 1–1 | 0–0 | 3–0 | 0–0 | 2–1 | 0–0 | 2–1 | 0–2 | 0–0 | 0–2 |
| El Dakhleya | 1–4 | 1–2 | 0–0 | — | 1–1 | 0–1 | 2–1 | 1–1 | 0–1 | 1–2 | 0–1 | 1–2 | 3–3 | 0–0 | 2–1 | 0–0 | 0–0 | 1–1 |
| ENPPI | 0–2 | 2–0 | 1–0 | 0–0 | — | 2–3 | 1–0 | 0–0 | 1–2 | 1–0 | 1–2 | 2–1 | 2–1 | 2–1 | 1–1 | 0–2 | 0–0 | 1–1 |
| Future | 0–0 | 2–1 | 1–0 | 0–1 | 1–0 | — | 1–0 | 1–0 | 0–0 | 1–0 | 1–1 | 0–0 | 3–0 | 0–0 | 1–1 | 1–1 | 0–0 | 2–3 |
| Ghazl El Mahalla | 0–2 | 1–2 | 0–3 | 2–1 | 1–0 | 0–1 | — | 1–2 | 2–1 | 2–0 | 1–1 | 0–3 | 0–0 | 0–0 | 0–2 | 0–2 | 3–2 | 2–1 |
| Haras El Hodoud | 0–3 | 1–0 | 0–0 | 0–1 | 0–1 | 0–2 | 2–1 | — | 2–0 | 2–2 | 0–0 | 0–2 | 2–1 | 0–0 | 0–1 | 0–0 | 2–3 | 0–3 |
| Ismaily | 0–1 | 1–1 | 1–1 | 3–1 | 3–1 | 0–0 | 1–1 | 1–0 | — | 4–1 | 0–1 | 1–3 | 0–0 | 0–0 | 1–2 | 0–1 | 0–1 | 2–1 |
| Al Ittihad | 0–2 | 2–0 | 1–0 | 2–0 | 1–2 | 0–1 | 0–2 | 1–0 | 1–1 | — | 1–2 | 0–0 | 0–0 | 1–0 | 1–2 | 3–1 | 3–1 | 0–0 |
| Al Masry | 0–0 | 1–2 | 0–3 | 1–1 | 2–0 | 2–0 | 1–1 | 1–0 | 1–2 | 2–1 | — | 2–2 | 0–0 | 1–2 | 0–0 | 0–1 | 1–0 | 3–2 |
| Al Mokawloon Al Arab | 1–4 | 1–0 | 2–1 | 0–1 | 3–2 | 0–0 | 1–1 | 3–2 | 2–2 | 0–0 | 0–0 | — | 1–1 | 0–0 | 0–0 | 0–1 | 0–0 | 0–0 |
| National Bank | 0–3 | 0–0 | 3–1 | 3–1 | 2–3 | 1–0 | 2–2 | 1–0 | 2–0 | 2–3 | 0–0 | 2–1 | — | 1–1 | 2–1 | 2–2 | 2–0 | 0–1 |
| Pharco | 1–2 | 0–0 | 1–1 | 1–1 | 0–1 | 2–3 | 3–1 | 1–0 | 1–1 | 3–2 | 0–3 | 2–1 | 1–0 | — | 1–2 | 1–0 | 1–1 | 3–0 |
| Pyramids | 3–0 | 2–1 | 2–2 | 2–0 | 2–1 | 1–0 | 4–0 | 1–0 | 3–1 | 3–0 | 0–0 | 2–0 | 2–0 | 3–0 | — | 5–2 | 4–2 | 0–0 |
| Smouha | 0–2 | 1–2 | 2–2 | 4–3 | 2–1 | 1–1 | 0–0 | 3–0 | 1–3 | 0–2 | 1–1 | 0–0 | 1–1 | 0–2 | 1–2 | — | 2–1 | 1–3 |
| Tala'ea El Gaish | 0–2 | 1–0 | 0–0 | 0–1 | 2–1 | 0–0 | 1–0 | 2–2 | 1–1 | 3–4 | 3–1 | 1–2 | 1–0 | 2–2 | 0–1 | 2–0 | — | 0–4 |
| Zamalek | 0–3 | 1–0 | 1–0 | 1–1 | 0–2 | 2–1 | 2–0 | 4–0 | 3–1 | 2–1 | 2–2 | 2–2 | 1–0 | 2–2 | 1–0 | 2–0 | 2–0 | — |

Source: worldfootball
Legend: Blue = home team win; Yellow = draw; Red = away team win.
For upcoming matches, an "a" indicates there is an article about the rivalry between the two participants.

== Season statistics ==
=== Top goalscorers ===
| Rank | Player | Club | Goals | Matches Played |
|---|---|---|---|---|
| 1 | (Angola) Christopher Mabululu | Al Ittihad Alexandria | 16 | 30 |
| 2 | (Egypt) Ahmed Sayed Zizo | Zamalek | 13 | 34 |
| 3 | (Egypt) Mohamed Hamdy Zaky | Aswan | 12 | 28 |
| 4 | (Egypt) Mohamed Sherif | Al Ahly | 11 | 28 |
| 5 | (Egypt) Ahmed El Sheikh | Ghazl El Mahalla | 10 | 32 |
| 5 | (Egypt) Ahmed Amin | ENPPI | 10 | 26 |
| 7 | (Egypt) Samir Fekri | El-Dakhelya | 9 | 32 |
| 7 | (Nigeria) John Okoli | Al-Mokawoloon Al-Arab | 9 | 33 |
| 7 | (Egypt) Mohamed Abdul-latif Grendo | Al Masry SC | 9 | 31 |
| 7 | (South Africa) Fagrie Lakay | Pyramids | 9 | 28 |
| 11 | (Algeria) Rezki Hamroune | Pharco | 8 | 31 |
| 11 | (Egypt) Ahmed Yasser Rayyan | Ceramica Cleopatra | 8 | 29 |
| 11 | (Egypt) Mostafa Fathi | Pyramids | 8 | 31 |
| 11 | (Tunisia) Ali Maâloul | Al Ahly | 8 | 24 |
| 11 | (Egypt) Karim Bambo | National Bank of Egypt SC | 8 | 27 |
| 11 | (Egypt) Mohamed El Shamy | Ismaily SC | 8 | 28 |
| 11 | (Tunisia) Rafik Kabou | ENPPI | 8 | 33 |

=== Top assists ===
As of 15 July 2023

| Rank | Player | Club | Assists |
|---|---|---|---|
| 1 | (Egypt) Ahmed Sayed Zizo | Zamalek | 13 |
| 2 | (Morocco) Walid El-Kharti | Pyramids | 9 |
| 3 | (Egypt) Ramadan Sobhi | Pyramids | 7 |
| 3 | (Tunisia) Ilies Jelassi | Al-Masry | 7 |
| 5 | (Morocco) Ahmed Belhadji | Aswan | 6 |
| 5 | (Tunisia) Ali Maâloul | Al-Ahly | 6 |
| 5 | (Egypt) Mohamed Shokry | Ceramica Cleopatra | 6 |
| 5 | (Cameroon) Jonathan Ngwem | Future | 6 |
| 5 | (Nigeria) Gabriel Orok | Ghazl El Mahalla | 6 |
| 10 | (Egypt) Hossam Hassan | Smouha | 5 |
| 10 | (Egypt) Hussein El Shahat | Al Ahly | 5 |
| 10 | (Egypt) Afsha | Al Ahly | 5 |
| 10 | (Tunisia) Rafik Kabou | ENPPI | 5 |
| 10 | (Egypt) Ahmed Khalef | Aswan | 5 |

== Awards ==
=== Player of the Season ===
| Player | Nationality | Club |
|---|---|---|
| Hussein El Shahat | Egypt | Al Ahly |

=== Striker of the Season ===
| Player | Nationality | Club |
|---|---|---|
| Mabululu | Angola | Al Ittihad Alexandria |

=== Midfielder of the Season ===
| Player | Nationality | Club |
|---|---|---|
| Marwan Attia | Egypt | Al Ahly |

=== Defender of the Season ===
| Player | Nationality | Club |
|---|---|---|
| Mohamed Abdelmonem | Egypt | Al Ahly |

=== Goalkeeper of the Season ===
| Player | Nationality | Club |
|---|---|---|
| Mohamed El Shenawy | Egypt | Al Ahly |

=== Manager of the Season ===
| Manager | Nationality | Club |
|---|---|---|
| Marcel Koller | Switzerland | Al Ahly |

=== Team of the Season ===

Egyptian League Team of the Season

| Position | Player | Club |
|---|---|---|
| Goalkeeper | (Egypt) Mohamed El Shenawy | Al Ahly |
| Defender | (Egypt) Mohamed Hany | Al Ahly |
| Defender | (Egypt) Yasser Ibrahim | Al Ahly |
| Defender | (Egypt) Mohamed Abdelmonem | Al Ahly |
| Defender | (Tunisia) Ali Maâloul | Al Ahly |
| Midfielder | (Egypt) Marwan Attia | Al Ahly |
| Midfielder | (Egypt) Hamdy Fathy | Al Ahly |
| Midfielder | (Egypt) Abdallah El Said | Pyramids |
| Forward | (Egypt) Hussein El Shahat | Al Ahly |
| Forward | (Egypt) Ahmed Zizo | Zamalek |
| Forward | (Angola) Christopher Mabululu | Al Ittihad Alexandria |
