= El Shenawy =

El Shenawy (in Arabic الشناوي) is an Arabic surname and may refer to:

- Ahmed El Shenawy (born 1991), Egyptian footballer
- Mohamed El Shenawy (born 1988), Egyptian footballer
