= Ofei =

Ofei is a surname. Notable people with the surname include:

- Bernice Ofei (fl. 1990s–2000s), Ghanaian gospel artist
- David Ofei (born 1989), Ghanaian footballer
- Mohamed Ofei Sylla (1974–2019), Guinean footballer

== See also ==
- Offei, another surname
