= Ahmed El Shenawy =

Egyptian footballer (born 1991)

Ahmed El Shenawy أحمد الشناوي
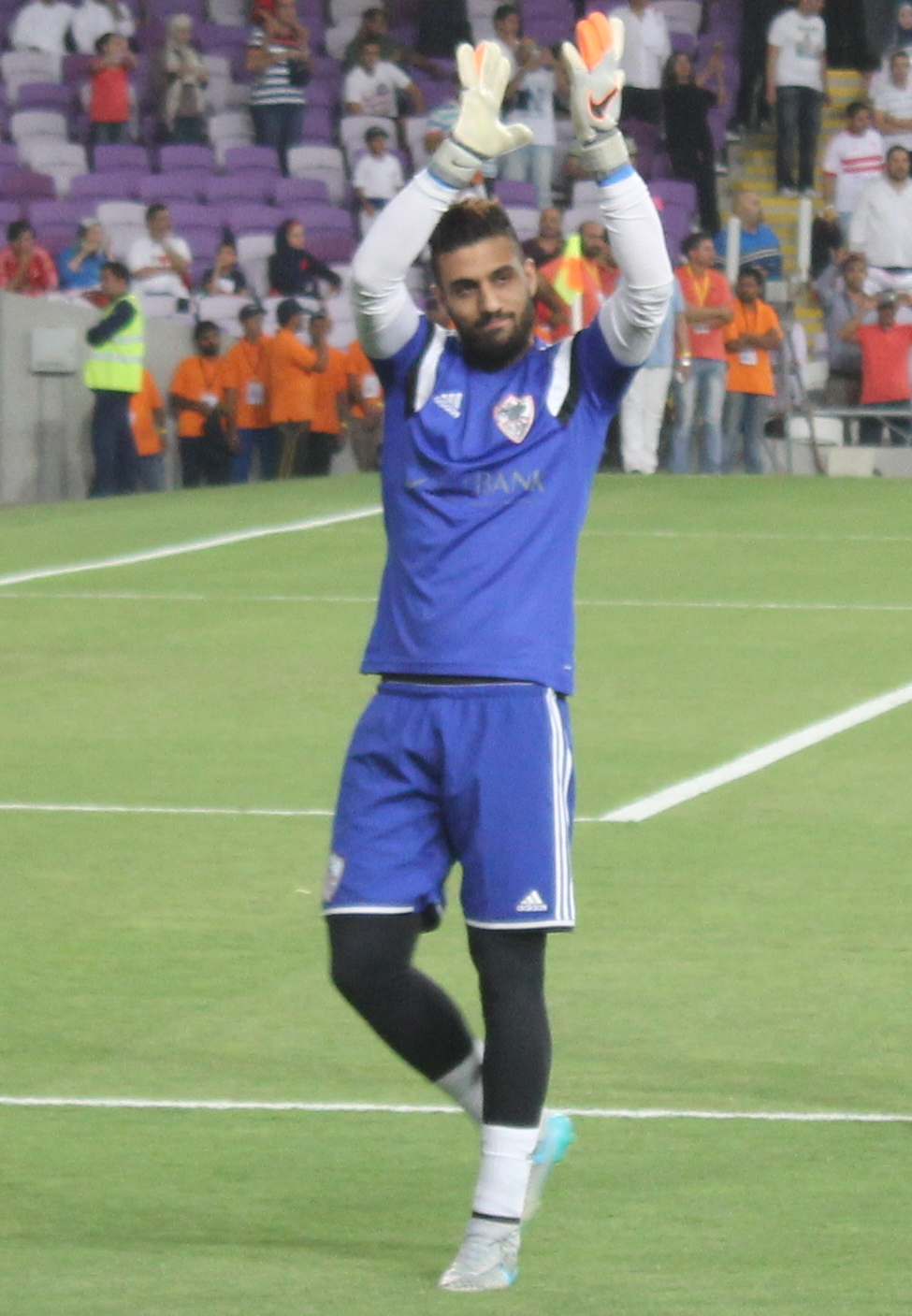
- El Shenawy with Zamalek in 2015

Personal information
- Full name: Ahmed Nasser Nasser Mahmoud Moawad El Shenawy
- Date of birth: 14 May 1991 (age 35)
- Place of birth: Port Said, Egypt
- Height: 1.95 m (6 ft 5 in)
- Position: Goalkeeper

Team information
- Current team: Pyramids
- Number: 1

Youth career
- –2009: Al Masry

Senior career*
Years	Team	Apps	(Gls)
2009–2014	Al Masry	58	(0)
2012–2013	→ Zamalek (loan)	1	(0)
2014–2018	Zamalek	102	(0)
2018–	Pyramids	140	(0)

International career^{‡}
2011	Egypt U20	12	(0)
2011–2012	Egypt U23	9	(0)
2011–	Egypt	29	(0)
- * Club domestic league appearances and goals as of 9 March 2026 ‡ National team caps and goals as of 23 March 2019

Ahmed Nasser Nasser Mahmoud Moawad El Shenawy (Arabic: أحمد ناصر ناصر محمود معوض الشناوي; born 14 May 1991), is an Egyptian professional footballer who plays as a goalkeeper for Egyptian Premier League side Pyramids and the Egyptian national team.

== Club career ==
=== Zamalek ===
After Al-Masry decided not to participate in the 2012–13 season, sympathizing with the relatives of the martyrs of the Port Said Stadium disaster, El Shenawy was loaned to Egyptian giant Zamalek SC for one season.

Shenawy signed a permanent deal for Zamalek in the summer of 2014 to replace goalkeeper Abdel-Wahed El-Sayed. He succeeded in having the longest clean sheet streak for Zamalek in the Egyptian Premier League history with seven consecutive matches without conceding any and overall got 19 clean sheets in the 2014–15 league which was won by Zamalek SC under the management of Jesualdo Ferreira.

== International career ==
He won the best goalkeeper award in the 2011 African Youth Championship along with the bronze medal and the fair play award. He was part of Egypt's 2012 Olympic squad.

On 4 January 2017, El Shenawy was called up to the Egypt squad for the 2017 Africa Cup of Nations.

On 11 June 2019, El Shenawy was called up to the Egypt squad for the 2019 Africa Cup of Nations.

On 30 December 2023, El Shenawy was called up to the Egypt squad for the 2023 Africa Cup of Nations.

On 2 December 2025, El Shenawy was called up to the Egypt squad for the 2025 Africa Cup of Nations.

== Career statistics ==
=== Club ===
As of match played 26 January 2025

Appearances and goals by club, season and competition
Club	Season	League			National cup (Note: Includes Egypt Cup)		Continental		Other		Total	
Club	Season	Division	Apps	Goals	Apps	Goals	Apps	Goals	Apps	Goals	Apps	Goals
Al Masry	2008–09	Egyptian Premier League	1	0	0	0	0	0	0	0	1	0
Al Masry	2009–10	Egyptian Premier League	15	0	2	0	0	0	0	0	17	0
Al Masry	2010–11	Egyptian Premier League	11	0	0	0	0	0	0	0	11	0
Al Masry	2011–12	Egyptian Premier League	13	0	0	0	0	0	0	0	13	0
Zamalek (loan)	2012–13	Egyptian Premier League	1	0	0	0	0	0	0	0	1	0
Al Masry	2013–14	Egyptian Premier League	18	0	1	0	0	0	0	0	19	0
Al Masry	Total		58	0	3	0	0	0	0	0	61	0
Zamalek	2014–15	Egyptian Premier League	26	0	1	0	0	0	1 (Note: Appearance in Egyptian Super Cup)	0	28	0
Zamalek	2015–16	Egyptian Premier League	24	0	4	0	11 (Note: Appearance(s) in the CAF Confederation Cup)	0	1	0	40	0
Zamalek	2016–17	Egyptian Premier League	23	0	2	0	7 (Note: Appearance(s) in the CAF Champions League)	0	0	0	32	0
Zamalek	2017–18	Egyptian Premier League	29	0	1	0	2	0	0	0	32	0
Zamalek	Total		102	0	8	0	20	0	2	0	130	0
Pyramids	2018–19	Egyptian Premier League	21	0	4	0	0	0	0	0	25	0
Pyramids	2019–20	Egyptian Premier League	10	0	2	0	7	0	0	0	19	0
Pyramids	2020–21	Egyptian Premier League	2	0	1	0	4	0	0	0	7	0
Pyramids	2021–22	Egyptian Premier League	11	0	4	0	0	0	0	0	15	0
Pyramids	2022–23	Egyptian Premier League	33	0	3	0	11	0	1	0	48	0
Pyramids	2023–24	Egyptian Premier League	29	0	4	0	7	0	0	0	40	-
Pyramids	2024–25	Egyptian Premier League	10	0	0	0	8	0	2 (Note: 1 Appearance in the Egyptian Super Cup & Egyptian League Cup)	0	20	0
Pyramids	2025–26	Egyptian Premier League	19	0	3	0	10	0	2 (Note: 11 Appearance in the Egyptian Super Cup & Egyptian League Cup)	0	43	0
Pyramids	Total		116	0	18	0	37	0	3	0	174	0
Career Total			277	0	29	0	57	0	5	0	366	0

== Honours ==
Zamalek

- Egyptian Premier League: 2014–15
- Egypt Cup: 2014–15, 2015–16, 2017–18
- Egyptian Super Cup: 2017

Pyramids

- Egypt Cup: 2023–24, 2025–26
- CAF Champions League: 2024–25
- CAF Super Cup: 2025
- FIFA African–Asian–Pacific Cup: 2025
