= Offei =

Offei is a surname. Notable people with the surname include:

- Michael Offei (born 1966), British actor
- Stephen Offei (born 1986), Ghanaian footballer

== See also ==
- Ofei, surname
