= Canal derby =

Rivalry between Egyptian association football clubs

Canal Derby
- Other names: Leadership of the Canal
- Location: Suez Canal Province, Egypt
- Teams: Al-Masry SC; Ismaily SC
- First meeting: Al-Masry 3–3 Ismaily; Egypt Cup (14 April 1930)
- Latest meeting: Al-Masry 1–0 Ismaily; Premier League (27 June 2024)
- Next meeting: TBD

Statistics
- Total meetings: 133
- Most wins: Ismaily (56)
- Top scorer: El-Sayed El-Dhizui (12)
- All-time series: Ismaily: 56; Drawn: 45; Al-Masry: 32
- Largest victory: Al-Masry 7–2 Ismaily; 1934 Sultan Hussien Cup Quarter Final (25 March 1934); Al-Masry 6–1 Ismaily; 1947 Egypt Cup Quarter Final (20 April 1947)

The Canal Derby (Arabic: ديربي القناة) is a football match between the Egyptian clubs Al-Masry SC and Ismaily SC. It is a match between arguably the two biggest and most popular clubs in the Suez Canal region in Egypt. Al-Masry SC is located in Port Said while Ismaily SC is based in Ismailia. Usually the Derby is played twice each season with 2 matches in the Egyptian Premier League, but it is not uncommon to find the teams meeting each other in the Egypt Cup.

== The rivalry ==
Ever since their creation, both clubs have been the top clubs in the Suez Canal region, they were competing in the Canal Zone League before the commence of the Egyptian Premier League.

The largest winning margin in this derby was 7–2 for Al-Masry in 1934 Sultan Hussien Cup Quarter Final and also 6–1 for Al-Masry in 1944 Egypt Cup Quarter Final, meanwhile the largest winning margin in the league matches was 5–0 for Ismaily in 1997–98 Egyptian Premier League.

Despite some sporadic clashes that may take place between fans during their matches, both sides have good relations in general due to the common history, strong social relations between the residents of their cities and the unity of the two clubs and their fans against the hegemony of the biggest two clubs in Egypt (Al Ahly SC and Zamalek SC).

== Statistics ==
As of 27 June 2024

| Competition | Total | Ismaily wins | Draws | Al-Masry wins |
|---|---|---|---|---|
| League | 122 | 53 | 43 | 26 |
| Cup | 7 | 3 | 2 | 2 |
| EFA League Cup | 1 | 0 | 0 | 1 |
| Sultan Hussein Cup | 3 | 0 | 0 | 3 |
| Canal Zone League | – | – | – | – |
| Total | 133 | 56 | 45 | 32 |

Top goalscorers

| Player | Team | Goals |
|---|---|---|
| (Egypt) El-Sayed El-Dhizui | Al-Masry | 12 |
| (Egypt) Emad Soliman | Ismaily | 10 |
| (Egypt) Shehta | Ismaily | 9 |
| (Egypt) Mosaad Nour | Al-Masry | 8 |
| (Egypt) Khaled El-Kammash | Ismaily | 7 |

== Honours ==
| Team | League | Cup | Sultan Hussien Cup | Canal Zone League | CAF Champions League | Total |
|---|---|---|---|---|---|---|
| Al-Masry | 0 | 1 | 3 | 17 | 0 | 21 |
| Ismaily | 3 | 2 | 0 | 1 | 1 | 7 |
| Combined | 3 | 3 | 3 | 18 | 1 | 28 |
