= Benjamin Acheampong =

Ghanaian footballer (born 1990)

Personal information
- Date of birth: 15 May 1990 (age 36)
- Place of birth: Kumasi, Ashanti, Ghana
- Height: 1.66 m (5 ft 5 1/2 in)
- Position: Striker

Team information
- Current team: Europa
- Number: 24

Youth career
- 2008–2009: Gamba All Blacks
- 2009–2010: Wa All Stars

Senior career*
Years	Team	Apps	(Gls)
2010–2011	Coruxo B	12	(0)
2011–2013	Asante Kotoko	4	(1)
2013–2014	Petro de Luanda		
2014–2016	Al-Aqaba		
2016–2017	El Dakhleya	31	(10)
2017–2018	Zamalek	5	(2)
2018	→ Petrojet (loan)	10	(0)
2018–2019	Al-Shamal		
2021	El Dakhleya		
2024–	Europa	1	(0)

International career^{‡}
2011–2012	Ghana U23		
- * Club domestic league appearances and goals as of 1 November 2024 ‡ National team caps and goals as of 1 June 2012 (UTC)

Benjamin Acheampong (/əˈtʃæmˈpɒŋ/ ə-CHAM-PONG-G) (born 15 May 1990) is a Ghanaian professional footballer who plays as a striker and he is also a member of the Ghana national team.

== Club career ==
=== Coruxo FC ===
Acheampong joined the first team of Spanish club Coruxo FC at the beginning of the 2010–11 season, and played for Coruxo FC until the end of the 2010–11 season.

=== Asante Kotoko ===
Acheampong signed for Ghanaian Ghana Premier League club Asante Kotoko from Coruxo FC at the beginning of the 2011–12 season. In his first season with Asante Kotoko he has won the 2011–12 Ghana Premier League season.

=== Zamalek ===
In February 2021, Acheampong revealed that he had been duped out of $1 million by the Egyptian club who used contract clauses to avoid paying the sum.

== International career ==
=== Ghana national team ===
On 16 May 2012, Acheampong was called up to the Ghana squad for two, 2014 FIFA World Cup qualification matches against Lesotho national football team and Zambia national football team.

== Honours ==
=== Club ===
Asante Kotoko

- Ghana Premier League (1): 2011–12
