= Canal Zone League =

Egyptian football tournament

Canal League
- Founded: 1927
- Folded: 1953
- Country: Egypt
- Level on pyramid: 1
- Domestic cup: Egypt Cup
- Last champions: Ismaily (1949–50)
- Most championships: Al-Masry (17 titles)

Canal Zone League or Canal League is an old Egyptian football tournament. Before the start of Egyptian league in its current form, the main competition was Egypt Cup which started 1922. Egyptian federation started its 1st league competition in the form of regional leagues (Cairo, Alexandria, Bahary & Canal). The Canal League included the teams of the three cities of the Suez Canal (Port Said, Ismailia, Suez), the most popular teams participated in it are Al-Masry and Ismaily beside other Egyptian and foreign teams situated in the region. The competition stopped after the commence of the Egyptian league. Al-Masry was the most successful team in this competition, as it won 17 titles while Ismaily captured one title.

== Performances ==
Team	Titles	Winning years
Al-Masry	17	1932, 1933, 1934, 1935, 1936, 1937, 1938, 1939, 1940, 1941, 1942, 1943, 1944, 1945, 1946, 1947, 1948
Ismaily	1	1949–50
