= Richard Boro =

Togolese professional footballer

Personal information
- Full name: Richard Essozolan Boro
- Date of birth: 20 November 1996 (age 29)
- Place of birth: Afagnan, Togo
- Height: 1.81 m (5 ft 11 in)
- Position: Midfielder

Team information
- Current team: San Pédro

Senior career*
Years	Team	Apps	(Gls)
2016-2018	Dynamic Togolais		
2018	Wadi Degla	9	(0)
2019	Tala'ea El Gaish	5	(0)
2019–	San Pédro		

International career
2017	Togo	1	(0)
- * Club domestic league appearances and goals

Richard Boro (born 20 November 1996) is a Togolese professional footballer who plays as a midfielder for Ivorian club FC San Pédro.

== Club career ==
In January 2018, Boro moved to Wadi Degla in Egypt from Dynamic Togolais, signing a two-and-a-half-year contract. The following January, he signed with Tala'ea El Gaish, also in Egypt.

== International career ==
He made his international debut for Togo in a friendly match against Egypt in March 2017.
