= Zoran Manojlović =

Serbian football manager (born 1962)

Personal information
- Date of birth: 21 July 1962 (age 64)

Managerial career
- Years: Team
- 2017–2019: Primeiro de Agosto
- 2019–2020: Wydad AC
- 2020–2021: Al-Hilal Club
- 2021: CR Belouizdad
- 2021: Al-Tai
- 2022: Simba
- 2022–2023: Al Ittihad

Zoran Manojlović (born 21 July 1962) is a Serbian football coach.

== Career ==
Manojlović began his coaching career in Portugal.

Manojlović coached three club sides in Angola, including Primeiro de Agosto (between December 2017 and July 2019) whom he guided to the African Champions League semi-final in 2018. He also served as an assistant coach at Kabuscorp in 2012.

Manojlović was appointed head coach of Moroccan club Wydad AC in July 2019. In November 2019 he said he was "thrilled" to be working at the club. He left the club in January 2020.

In October 2020, he became manager of Sudanese club Al-Hilal Club.

In April 2021, he became manager of Algerian club CR Belouizdad.

On 30 August 2021, Manojlović was appointed as the manager of Saudi Arabian club Al-Tai. On 4 November 2021, he was sacked with the club sitting at the bottom of the table.

In June 2022, he became manager of Tanzanian club Simba.

In September 2022, he became manager of Egyptian club Al Ittihad, until his resignation following the end of the 2022–23 season.

== Honours ==
CR Belouizdad

- Algerian Ligue Professionnelle 1 (1): 2020–21
