= Ahmed Abdel Moneim =

Egyptian football manager (born 1973)

Personal information
- Full name: Ahmed Abdel Moneim
- Date of birth: 8 January 1973 (age 53)
- Place of birth: Cairo, Egypt
- Height: 1.82 m (6 ft 0 in)
- Position: Forward

Youth career
- 1986-1993: Al Mokawloon Al Arab

Senior career*
Years	Team	Apps	(Gls)
1993–1995	Eastern Company		
1995–1999	Al Ahly	63	(12)
1999–2000	Neuchâtel Xamax	6	(0)
2000–2002	Al Masry	16	(12)
2002–2003	Goldi	3	(4)
2003–2004	Suez Cement		
2004–2005	El Gouna		

International career
1995–1996	Egypt	7	(1)

Managerial career
- 2008–2011: Djibouti
- 2011–2011: Ittihad Nabarouh
- 2016–2017: Al Nasr Lel Taa'den (assistant)
- 2017: Aswan (assistant)
- 2017: Al Nasr Lel Taa'den
- 2017: Baladeyet El Mahalla
- 2018–2019: Al Tarsana
- 2019–2019: Al Tarsana
- 2020–2020: Sohag
- 2020–2020: Aswan
- 2021: El Entag El Harby
- 2022: ENPPI
- * Club domestic league appearances and goals

Ahmed Abdel Moneim (Arabic: أَحْمَد عَبْد الْمُنْعِم; born 8 January 1973), commonly known as Ahmed Koshary, is an Egyptian football manager and a former player.

== International career ==
Abdel Moneim made some appearances for the Egypt national team, including 1996 African Cup of Nations in South Africa where he participated as a substitute against South Africa and Zambia. He scored his only goal for Egypt against South Korea in a 1–1 friendly draw.

== Honours ==
Al Ahly

- Egyptian League: 1994–95, 1995–96, 1996–97, 1997–98, 1998–99
- Egypt Cup: 1995–96

== Career statistics ==
=== Club ===
As of match played 10 April 2023

Appearances and goals by club, season and competition
Club	Season	League			National Cup		CAF Champions League		Arab Super Cup		Other		Total	
Club	Season	Division	Apps	Goals	Apps	Goals	Apps	Goals	Apps	Goals	Apps	Goals	Apps	Goals
Tersana	1993–94	Egyptian Second Division			—		—		—		—			
Tersana	1994–95	Egyptian Second Division		30	—		—		—		—			
Tersana	total				0	0	0	0	0	0	0	0		
Al Ahly	1995–96	Egyptian Premier League	26	7	4	1	0	0	—		4 (Note: Appearances in 1995 Arab Cup Winners' Cup)	3	34	11
Al Ahly	1996–97	Egyptian Premier League	17	2	6	5	0	0	2	1	4 (Note: Appearances in 1996 Arab Club Champions Cup)	7	27	14
Al Ahly	1997–98	Egyptian Premier League	12	2	4	6	2	1	3	0	2 (Note: Appearances in 1997 Arab Club Champions Cup)	2	20	11
Al Ahly	1998–99	Egyptian Premier League	8	1	0	0	0	0	—		1 (Note: Appearances in 1998 Arab Club Champions Cup)	0	9	1
Al Ahly	total		63	12	14	12	2	1	5	1	11	12	95	38

=== International ===
Scores and results list Egypt's goal tally first.

#	Date	Venue	Opponent	Score	Result	Competition
1	25 March 1996	Al Maktoum Stadium, Dubai, United Arab Emirates	South Korea	1–0	1–1	Friendly

=== Managerial ===
As of match played 21 October 2020

Managerial record by team and tenure
Team	From	To	Record					Ref.
Team	From	To	P	W	D	L	Win %	Ref.
Djibouti	12 September 2008	1 January 2011	11	0	1	10	0.0	
Ittihad Nabarouh	4 January 2011	13 March 2011	0	0	0	0	—	
Al Nasr Lel Taa'den	23 March 2017	12 July 2017	12	5	1	6	41.7	
Baladeyet El Mahalla	27 October 2017	30 December 2017	9	3	4	2	33.3	
Al Tarsana	1 July 2018	30 June 2019	30	16	9	5	53.3	
Al Tarsana	5 November 2019	29 November 2019	4	2	0	2	50.0	
Sohag	4 January 2020	20 June 2020	6	3	1	2	50.0	
Aswan	20 June 2020	21 October 2020	19	5	6	8	26.3	
Total			91	34	22	35	37.4	—
