= David Ofei =

Ghanaian footballer

Personal information
- Date of birth: June 7, 1989 (age 37)
- Place of birth: Ghana
- Height: 5 ft 9 in (1.75 m)
- Position: Midfielder

Team information
- Current team: Asante Kotoko

Youth career
- Young Sparrows

Senior career*
Years	Team	Apps	(Gls)
2004–2006	Great Olympics		
2007	→ Okwaho Mountains (loan)		
2007–2008	Great Olympics		
2009–2010	New Edubiase		
2010–2013	Asante Kotoko		
2013–	Amidaus Professionals		

International career
2005	Ghana U-17		
- * Club domestic league appearances and goals

David Ofei (born June 7, 1989) is a Ghanaian football player who plays in Ghana for Amidaus Professionals.

== Career ==
The attacking midfielder started his career with Tromeso (near Wenchi) based club Young Sparrows. In summer 2004 left Tromeso and joined to Great Olympics, which loaned him in the Spring 2007 to lower league side Okwaho Mountains. After one season returned to Great Olympics, which sold him now to New Edubiase FC. On 1 July 2011 left New Edubiase United and signed with Ghana Premier League champion Asante Kotoko SC. He played two years with Asante, before signed on 1. September 2013 for League rival Amidaus Professionals.

== International ==
Ofei was member of the Ghana U-17 at African U-17 Championship 2005 in Gambia.
