= Mohamed Youssef (footballer) =

Egyptian football manager (born 1970)

Personal information
- Date of birth: 9 October 1970 (age 56)
- Place of birth: Cairo, Egypt
- Height: 1.83 m (6 ft 0 in)
- Position: Defender

Senior career*
Years	Team	Apps	(Gls)
1989–1999	Al Ahly	210	(5)
1999–2001	Denizlispor	52	(9)
2001–2002	Diyarbakirspor	9	(0)
2002–2004	ENPPI	20	(0)

International career
1993–2001	Egypt	95	(1)

Managerial career
- 2009–2013: Al Ahly (assistant)
- 2013: Al Ahly (interim)
- 2013–2014: Al Ahly
- 2014–2015: Al-Shorta
- 2015: Smouha
- 2016–2017: Al-Shorta
- 2017: Petrojet
- 2018: Al Ahly (assistant)
- 2018: Al Ahly (interim)
- 2018–2019: Al Ahly (assistant)
- 2019: Al Ahly (interim)
- 2020–2021: Bank El Ahly
- 2021: Future (technical director)
- 2022–2023: Tala'ea El Gaish
- 2024: Egypt (interim)
- 2024: Al Ahly (assistant)
- * Club domestic league appearances and goals

Mohamed Youssef (Arabic: مُحَمَّد يُوسُف; born 9 October 1970) is an Egyptian former professional footballer who played as a defender for several clubs in Egypt and Turkey and the Egypt national team.

== Club career ==
Youssef began his professional career in the Egyptian Premier League with Al Ahly, winning six league titles over an eight-year period. In 1999, he moved to Turkey where he played in the Super Lig for Denizlispor and Diyarbakirspor. He returned to Egypt to play with Egyptian Premier League side ENPPI.

== International career ==
Youssef started his career with the U-17 national team and played with them at the 1987 U-17 world Cup in Canada and also played with the U-19 national team.

Youssef was the captain of the Egyptian team in the Barcelona 1992 Summer Olympics and scored a goal against Colombia. He made his debut with the first Egyptian national team in a 1994 African Nations Cup qualifier against Morocco on 11 July 1993. Youssef made 95 appearances for Egypt national football team, including three matches at the 1999 FIFA Confederations Cup, three qualifying matches for the 1998 FIFA World Cup and two qualifying matches for the 2002 FIFA World Cup. He won with Egypt the 1998 African Nations Cup, and also played in the 1994 African Nations Cup and 2000 African Nations Cup.

== Coaching career ==
Youssef began his coaching career as an assistant coach at Al–Ahly's first team in June 2009 until April 2013.

On 7 May 2013, Youssef was promoted as head coach. He led Al-Ahly to win the 2013 CAF Champions League, and reached the 2013 FIFA Club World Cup. in Morocco. On 1 May 2014, he resigned from Al-Ahly. On 23 July 2014, he was appointed as manager of Iraqi Premier League champions Al Shorta SC. Despite winning 11 and drawing 4 of the 15 league games he took charge of and was leading their group in the AFC Cup, he was sacked in May 2015. In July 2015, he became head coach of Smouha in the Egyptian premier league, playing also with the Alexandrian club in the CAF champions league. In July 2016, he returned to Iraqi Premier League Al Shorta SC as head coach.

In July 2017, he became head coach of Petrojet in the Egyptian premier league. In June 2018, Youssef returned to Al-Ahly as an assistant coach and sports director till the end of his contract on 31 August 2019. On 19 October 2020, he was appointed as the head coach of the newly promoted National Bank of Egypt. In November 2022, he was appointed as head coach of Tala'ea El Gaish, following a tenure as technical director at Future in 2021.

On 4 February 2024, he was named as caretaker coach of the Egyptian national team, following the dismissal of Rui Vitória. Two days later, Hossam Hassan became the head coach of Egypt, and Youssef refused to take an administrative manager role.

== Managerial statistics ==
As of match played 2 December 2022

Managerial record by team and tenure
Team	From	To	Record					Ref.
Team	From	To	P	W	D	L	Win %	Ref.
Al Ahly SC (Caretaker)	29 April 2013	7 May 2013	2	2	0	0	100.0	
Al Ahly SC	7 May 2013	2 May 2014	39	20	8	11	51.3	
Al-Shorta SC	21 July 2014	2 May 2015	20	12	7	1	60.0	
Smouha SC	14 July 2015	1 November 2015	11	2	4	5	18.2	
Al-Shorta SC	29 June 2016	29 March 2017	24	12	9	3	50.0	
Petrojet SC	30 April 2017	31 December 2017	27	6	8	13	22.2	
Al Ahly SC	23 November 2018	17 December 2018	6	5	0	1	83.3	
Al Ahly SC	18 August 2019	31 August 2019	1	1	0	0	100.0	
Bank El Ahly	19 October 2020	17 February 2021	14	1	7	6	7.1	
Tala'ea El Gaish	3 November 2022	9 February 2023	14	2	6	6	14.3	
Total			158	63	49	46	39.9	—

== Honours ==
=== Player ===
Al Ahly

- Egyptian Premier League: 1993–94, 1994–95, 1995–96, 1996–97, 1997–98, 1998–99
- Egypt Cup: 1990–91, 1991–92, 1992–93, 1995–96
- Egyptian Confederation Cup: 1989
- African Cup Winners' Cup: 1993
- Arab Champions Cup: 1996
- Arab Super Cup: 1997, 1998
- Arab Cup Winners' Cup: 1994

=== International ===
- African Cup of Nations: 1998

=== Manager ===
Al-Ahly

- CAF Champions League: 2013
- CAF Super Cup: 2014
