= Mohamed Ouda =

Egyptian football manager (born 1974)

Personal information
- Date of birth: 24 January 1974 (age 52)
- Position: Centre-back

Team information
- Current team: Al-Nasr Benghazi (manager)

Senior career*
Years	Team	Apps	(Gls)
1993–2009	Al Mokawloon		

International career
1996	Egypt	1	(0)

Managerial career
- 2011: Al Mokawloon (assistant)
- 2011–2012: Telephonat (assistant)
- 2013–2014: Bahtim
- 2014: Al Mokawloon
- 2014–2016: Al Mokawloon (assistant)
- 2016–2018: Al Mokawloon
- 2018–2019: Al-Ahly Benghazi
- 2019: Petrojet
- 2020–2021: Al-Nasr Benghazi
- 2021: Ghazl El Mahalla
- 2021–2022: Al Mokawloon
- 2022–2023: Al Hilal Omdurman
- 2024: Al Mokawloon
- 2025: Ghazl El Mahalla
- * Club domestic league appearances and goals

Mohamed Ouda (born 24 January 1974) is an Egyptian football manager.

As a player, he was a central defender who spent his entire career with Al Mokawloon, winning cup titles in 1995 and 2004. He was capped once for Egypt, in November 1996 against Mali.
