= Khaled Galal =

Egyptian footballer (born 1967)

Personal information
- Date of birth: 12 April 1967 (age 59)
- Place of birth: Egypt

Team information
- Current team: Ismaily (manager)

Managerial career
- Years: Team
- 2008–2010: Eastern Company SC
- 2011–2013: El Sharkia SC
- 2013–2014: Suez SC
- 2014–2015: Al Assiouty Sport
- 2015–2017: Suez SC
- 2017: Zamalek SC (Assistant manager)
- 2017–2018: FC Masr
- 2018: Zamalek SC (Caretaker)
- 2018–2019: Al-Shoulla FC
- 2019: Zamalek SC
- 2020: FC Masr
- 2026-: Ismaily

Khaled Galal (Arabic: خالد جلال; born 12 April 1967) is a former player in the Zamalek SC and a trainer for some Egyptian League clubs and the interim coach of Zamalek for several spells, in which he won the 2017–18 Egypt Cup.

== Coaching career ==
Khaled Galal took over the training of the FC Masr on 4 February 2020, to succeed Abdul Nasser Mohammed.

== Managerial statistics ==
As of match played 15 September 2020

Managerial record by team and tenure
Team	From	To	Record					Ref.
Team	From	To	P	W	D	L	Win %	Ref.
Eastern Company SC	1 July 2008	30 June 2010	4	2	1	1	50.0	
El Sharkia SC	1 August 2011	25 March 2013	19	10	4	5	52.6	
Suez SC	2 September 2013	20 December 2014	38	18	13	7	47.4	
Al Assiouty Sport	20 December 2014	15 April 2015	10	0	5	5	0.0	
Suez SC	30 August 2015	4 January 2017	33	19	9	5	57.6	
FC Masr	18 December 2017	13 April 2018	16	9	3	4	56.3	
Zamalek SC (Caretaker)	13 April 2018	30 June 2018	6	4	2	0	66.7	
Al-Shoulla FC	21 November 2018	27 February 2019	15	2	5	8	13.3	
Zamalek SC	31 May 2019	29 July 2019	4	1	2	1	25.0	
FC Masr	4 February 2020	15 September 2020	15	3	7	5	20.0	
Total			160	68	51	41	42.5	—

== Honours ==
=== As a manager ===
Zamalek SC:

- Egypt Cup: 2017–18
