= Mohamed Bassam =

Egyptian footballer (born 1990)

Mohamed Bassam محمد بسام
Personal information
- Full name: Mohamed Bassam Helmy Hassan
- Date of birth: 25 December 1990 (age 35)
- Place of birth: Cairo, Egypt
- Height: 1.91 m (6 ft 3 in)
- Position: Goalkeeper

Team information
- Current team: Ceramica Cleopatra
- Number: 18

Youth career
- Tala'ea El Gaish

Senior career*
| Years | Team | Apps | (Gls) |
| 2009–2022 | Tala'ea El Gaish | 228 | (0) |
| 2022– | Ceramica Cleopatra | 101 | (0) |

International career
| 2009–2011 | Egypt U20 | 1 | (0) |
| 2011–2012 | Egypt U23 | 2 | (0) |
- * Club domestic league appearances and goals

Mohamed Bassam Helmy Hassan (Arabic: محمد بسام حلمي حسن; born 25 December 1990) is an Egyptian professional footballer. He plays for Ceramica Cleopatra, and was briefly a member of the Egypt national team. He competed at the 2012 Summer Olympics.

== Club career ==
Bassam played most of his career for Tala'ea El Gaish SC, until he transferred to Ceramica Cleopatra in September 2022.

== International career ==
Bassam was part of the Egyptian youth national teams. He was selected for the Egypt U20 in the 2009 FIFA U-20 World Cup, then for the Egypt U23 in the 2011 African U-23 Championship and 2012 Summer Olympics.

== Honours ==
Club

Tala'ea El Gaish

- Egyptian Super Cup: 2020–21
- Egypt Cup runner-up: 2019–20

International

Egypt U23

- Africa U-23 Cup of Nations 3rd place: 2011
