= Tarek El Ashry =

Egyptian football manager (born 1964)

Personal information
- Date of birth: 24 November 1964 (age 61)
- Place of birth: Kafr El Dawwar, Beheira, Egypt
- Position: Defender

Team information
- Current team: Al-Nasr (manager)

Youth career
- 1978–1981: Kafr El Dawar
- 1981–1983: Al Ittihad

Senior career*
Years	Team	Apps	(Gls)
1983–1999	Al Ittihad		

International career
1985–1995	Egypt	10	(0)

Managerial career
- 2006–2012: Haras El Hodoud
- 2012–2013: ENPPI
- 2013–2014: Al-Ahly Benghazi
- 2014–2015: ENPPI
- 2015: Al-Shaab
- 2015–2016: Al Mokawloon Al Arab
- 2016: Al-Hilal
- 2016: Al Ahli Tripoli
- 2016–2017: ENPPI
- 2017–2018: Wadi Degla
- 2018–2020: Haras El Hodoud
- 2020: Al Masry
- 2020: Haras El Hodoud
- 2020–2021: Tala'ea El Gaish
- 2021–2022: Tala'ea El Gaish
- 2022–2023: Smouha
- 2023: Pharco
- 2023–: Al Ittihad
- * Club domestic league appearances and goals

Tarek El Ashry (Arabic: طارق العشري) is an Egyptian football manager and former player.

During his early managerial career, he came to prominence while leading Haras El Hodood, guiding the club to two Egypt Cup titles and one Egyptian Super Cup. He is also recognized for introducing a structured 4-4-2 tactical formation into Egyptian domestic football.

== Managerial career ==
El Ashry began his head coaching career with Egyptian Premier League team Haras El Hodood in 2006. Under his management, the team secured its first major trophy by winning the 2008–09 Egypt Cup, defeating ENNPI 4–1 on penalties following a 1-1 draw in the final.

In July 2009, Haras El Hodood defeated league champions, Al Ahly 2-0 to win the 2009 Egyptian Super Cup. El Ashry led the team to a second consecutive domestic cup victory in the 2009-10 Egypt Cup, again defeating Al Ahly 5-4 on penalties after a 1-1 draw in the final. Internationally, he managed Haras El Hodood across multiple appearances in the CAF Confederation Cup, achieving a group stage finish in 2008.

Following his tenure at Haras El Hodood, El Ashry managed several Egyptian and North African clubs, including ENPPI, Wadi Degla, Al Masry, Tala'ea El Gaish, Smouha, Al Ittihad Alexandria, and Pharco FC. He has also managed abroad in Libya (Al Ahli Ly, Al Ahli Tripoli, Al-Nasr Benghazi, and Al-Madinah), Sudan (Al-Hilal), and the United Arab Emirates (Al-Shaab).

== Honours ==
=== As a coach ===
Haras El Hodood

- Egypt Cup: 2008–09, 2009–10
- Egyptian Super Cup: 2009–10
