= Ehab Galal =

Egyptian football manager (1967–2024)

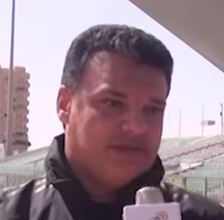
- Ehab Galal, 2019

Personal information
- Date of birth: 14 August 1967
- Place of birth: Dakahlia, United Arab Republic
- Date of death: 11 September 2024 (aged 57)
- Place of death: Heliopolis, Cairo, Egypt
- Position: Defender

Senior career*
Years	Team	Apps	(Gls)
1987–1990	El Shams		
1990–1999	Ismaily		
1999–2003	Al Masry		
2003–2004	El Qanah		

Managerial career
- 2004: Al Masry (Sporting Director)
- 2007–2008: Kahrabaa Ismailia
- 2008: Al Hammam
- 2008–2010: Ismaily (Sporting Director)
- 2010–2011: Al Hammam
- 2012–2014: Kafr El Sheikh
- 2014: Telephonat Beni Suef
- 2014–2017: El Makkasa
- 2017–2018: ENPPI
- 2018: Zamalek
- 2018: Al Ahli SC
- 2018–2020: Al Masry
- 2020: El Makkasa
- 2020–2021: El Makkasa
- 2021: Ismaily
- 2021–2022: Pyramids
- 2022: Egypt
- 2022–2023: Pharco FC
- 2023–2024: Ismaily
- * Club domestic league appearances and goals

Ehab Galal (Arabic: إِيهَاب جَلَال; 14 August 1967 – 11 September 2024) was an Egyptian football player and manager.

== Managerial career ==
Galal was the manager of El Makkasa for three seasons of 2014–2017, he also managed Enppi and Zamalek clubs during the 2017–18 Egyptian Premier League season. In 2018, he managed El Masry until 2020, then he had coached El Makkasa for six months in the same year.

On 12 April 2022, it was announced that Galal was going to be the Egyptian national team manager after Carlos Queiroz's departure. On 16 June 2022, he was sacked from his position after three games in charge.

On 17 December 2022, he became the head coach of Pharco FC. However, he resigned after only eight games on 24 January 2023. In August 2023, he became Ismaily's head coach for the second tenure after 2021.

== Death ==
Galal died from a stroke in Heliopolis, Cairo, on 11 September 2024, at the age of 57.

== Honours ==
=== Player ===
Ismaily

- Egypt Cup: 1996–97

=== Manager ===
El Makkasa

- Egyptian Premier League runner-up: 2016–17
