= Talaat Youssef =

Egyptian football manager (born 1955)

Personal information
- Date of birth: 21 January 1955 (age 71)
- Place of birth: Alexandria, Egypt
- Position: Midfielder

Senior career*
Years	Team	Apps	(Gls)
- Al Ittihad

Managerial career
- 1999–2000: Al Ittihad
- 2000–2001: El Koroum
- 2002: Al Ittihad
- 2003–2004: Baladiyat El Mahalla SC
- 2005–2006: Al Ittihad
- 2006–2008: Tala'ea El Gaish
- 2008–2011: Ittihad El Shorta
- 2011–2012: Al Masry
- 2012–2013: Telephonat Beni Suef SC
- 2013: Al Ittihad
- 2013–2014: Al Ahli Tripoli
- 2014: Al Ittihad
- 2014–2015: Tala'ea El Gaish SC
- 2015–2017: Petrojet
- 2017: Al Ahli Tripoli
- 2017–2018: Smouha
- 2018–2019: Makkasa
- 2019–2020: Al Ittihad
- 2021: Al Ahli Tripoli
- 2021: Ismaily SC
- 2022: El Gouna
- 2022–2023: ENPPI SC
- 2024: Modern Future FC
- * Club domestic league appearances and goals

Talaat Youssef (Egyptian Arabic: طَلْعَت يُوسُف; born 21 January 1955) is an Egyptian football manager and former player.

== Playing career ==
=== El Ittihad El Sakandary ===
Youssef is considered one of El Ittihad El Sakandary's (aka Alexandria Union) best and best-known players. He helped his team gain their latest trophy by scoring the winning goal against Al Ahly Cairo in 1976 Egyptian Football Cup. Youssef's loosely tied boot flew into the net as he shot the winning goal, which confused Al Ahly's goal keeper; Ekramy.

== Managerial career ==
Youssef not only led Al-Ittihad Al-Sakndary (aka Alexandria Union) to avoid relegation in 2004–05 Egyptian Premier League, but the team reached the 2004-05 Egyptian Football Cup Final game under his management. Although the team lost 0–1 to ENPPI after extra-time, it qualified for the 2006 CAF Confederation Cup because ENPPI qualified to the 2006 CAF Champions League. Al-Ittihad Al-Sakndary was eventually eliminated in the second round after losing to Tunisia's Espérance via Penalty shootout. Both teams had exchanged a 1–0 win on its home ground.

In June 2006, El Geish appointed Youssef as its new manager after his successful spell at Alexandria. He succeeded former coach Hassan Megahed, who died earlier that year. Youssef enjoyed a successful career with El Geish. He led the team to fourth position in 2007–08 Egyptian Premier League, and to semi-finals in 2007–08 Arab Champions League.

Youssed then moved to newly promoted Ittihad El-Shorta. He became the highest-paid local manager at the Egyptian Premier League with a monthly wage of EGP 70,000 according to some reports. He extended his contract for an extra season in May 2010.

He took over the training of the Al Ittihad on 22 May 2019, to succeed Helmy Toulan, started with a caretaker role, then signed a long contract. On 12 October 2020, he resigned from coaching El Ittihad. He later managed Al Ahli Tripoli for the third tenure and Ismaily SC in 2021, followed by El Gouna and ENPPI SC until February 2023. In May 2024, he became the head coach of Modern Future FC.

== Managerial statistics ==
As of match played 24 December 2020

Managerial record by team and tenure
Team	From	To	Record					Ref.
Team	From	To	P	W	D	L	Win %	Ref.
El Koroum	16 December 2000	30 June 2001	13	1	4	8	7.7	
Al Ittihad	1 July 2002	2 November 2002	6	0	2	4	0.0	
Baladeyet	15 October 2003	1 March 2004	10	2	2	6	20.0	
Al Ittihad	1 January 2005	30 June 2006	48	17	14	17	35.4	
Tala'ea El Gaish	1 July 2006	30 June 2008	77	33	25	19	42.9	
Ittihad El Shorta	1 July 2008	11 July 2011	98	38	35	25	38.8	
Al Masry	17 July 2011	15 January 2012	12	5	4	3	41.7	
Telephonat	13 May 2012	23 July 2013	15	5	6	4	33.3	
Al Ittihad	23 July 2013	16 December 2013	0	0	0	0	—	
Al Ahli (Tripoli)	17 December 2013	26 June 2014	14	11	1	2	78.6	
Al Ittihad	7 July 2014	27 October 2014	5	1	2	2	20.0	
Tala'ea El Gaish	5 November 2014	22 July 2015	30	11	6	13	36.7	
Petrojet	12 December 2015	8 January 2017	47	18	16	13	38.3	
Al Ahli (Tripoli)	9 January 2017	25 October 2017	19	9	6	4	47.4	
Smouha	9 December 2017	11 February 2018	11	5	1	5	45.5	
El Makkasa	17 February 2018	20 April 2019	47	20	12	15	42.6	
Al Ittihad	22 May 2019	12 October 2020	46	18	17	11	39.1	
Total			498	194	153	151	39.0	—

== Honours ==
=== Manager ===
Al Ahli Tripoli

- Libyan Premier League: 2013–14
