= 2018–19 El Entag El Harby SC season =

El Entag El Harby
2018–19 season
- President: Ashraf Amer
- Manager: Mokhtar Mokhtar
- Stadium: Al Salam Stadium
- Egyptian Premier League: 13th
- Egypt Cup: Round of 16
- Top goalscorer: League: Mohamed Ragab (6 goals); All: Mohamed Ragab (7 goals)
Home colours	Away colours

The 2018–19 El Entag El Harby season was the 14th season in the football club's history and 4th consecutive and 7th overall season in the top flight of Egyptian football, the Egyptian Premier League, having been promoted from the Egyptian Second Division in 2015. In addition to the domestic league, El Entag El Harby also competed in this season's editions of the domestic cup, the Egypt Cup. The season covered a period from 1 July 2018 to 30 June 2019.

== Kit information ==
Supplier: Uhlsport

Home	Away	Goalkeeper 1	Goalkeeper 2	Goalkeeper 3

== Players ==
=== Current squad ===
As of 1 February 2019

Note: Flags indicate national team as defined under FIFA eligibility rules; some limited exceptions apply. Players may hold more than one non-FIFA nationality.

No.	Pos.	Nation	Player
1	GK	EGY	Mohamed Moussa
2	DF	EGY	Mahmoud Adel
3	DF	EGY	Hesham Shehata
5	DF	EGY	Moaz El Henawy
6	MF	EGY	Ahmed Magdy
7	MF	EGY	Mahmoud Farag
8	DF	EGY	Abdel Rahman Farouk
9	FW	EGY	Mohamed Ragab
10	MF	EGY	Abdel Rahman Ramadan
11	FW	EGY	Karim Lala
12	DF	EGY	Ahmed Shedid (3rd captain)
13	DF	EGY	Mahmoud El Badry (Captain)
14	FW	EGY	Mohamed Mosaad (on loan from Misr Lel Makkasa)
15	FW	EGY	Hamada Nasser
16	GK	EGY	Amer Mohamed (Vice-captain)
17	FW	EGY	Ahmed Raouf
18	FW	NGR	James Owoboskini

No.	Pos.	Nation	Player
19	DF	EGY	Ahmed Dowidar
20	MF	EGY	Mahmoud Hamada (on loan from Misr Lel Makkasa)
21	MF	EGY	Mohamed Adel
22	DF	EGY	Sayed Shabrawy
23	FW	GUI	Moussa Diawara
24	GK	EGY	Ahmed Yehia
25	MF	EGY	Mahmoud Abdel Naby
29	FW	EGY	Alaa Salama
33	MF	EGY	Abdallah Rashed
34	DF	GHA	Abdulwahab Annan
66	MF	EGY	Ghanam Mohamed
72	DF	EGY	Mohamed Hussein (on loan from Al Ahly U-23)
77	FW	EGY	Mohamed Hamdy (on loan from Zamalek U-23)
88	MF	EGY	Mostafa El Gamal
98	FW	EGY	Abdel Aziz Abou El Wafa
-	FW	PLE	Hamed Hamdan (on loan from Pyramids)
-	DF	EGY	Ehab Samir (on loan from Al Mokawloon Al Arab)

=== Out on loan ===
Note: Flags indicate national team as defined under FIFA eligibility rules; some limited exceptions apply. Players may hold more than one non-FIFA nationality.

No. / Pos. / Nation / Player; — / FW / EGY / Mohamed El Fil (at Aswan until 30 June 2019)	No. / Pos. / Nation / Player; — / FW / EGY / Mohamed Maged (at Al Faisaly until 30 June 2019)

== Transfers ==
=== Transfers in ===
#	Position	Player	Transferred from	Fee	Date	Source
2	DF	(Egypt) Mahmoud Adel	(Egypt) Faiyum	Free transfer	16 April 2018	
13	DF	(Egypt) Mahmoud El Badry	(Egypt) Tala'ea El Gaish	Free transfer	28 April 2018	
9	FW	(Egypt) Mohamed Ragab	(Egypt) Petrojet	Undisclosed	9 May 2018	
11	FW	(Nigeria) Solomon Okuruket	(Egypt) Al Mokawloon Al Arab	Free transfer	12 May 2018	
33	MF	(Egypt) Abdallah Rashed	(Egypt) MS Atfih	E£40k	21 May 2018	
25	FW	(Egypt) Mohamed Maged	(Egypt) Al Masry	Free transfer	25 May 2018	
66	MF	(Egypt) Ghanam Mohamed	(Egypt) El Gouna	Undisclosed	27 May 2018	
24	GK	(Egypt) Ahmed Yehia	(Egypt) Smouha	Free transfer	29 May 2018	
7	MF	(Egypt) Mahmoud Farag	(Egypt) Al Ittihad	Undisclosed	30 May 2018	
3	DF	(Egypt) Hesham Shehata	(Egypt) Al Ittihad	E£250k	6 June 2018	
DF	19	(Egypt) Ahmed Dowidar	(Egypt) Ismaily	E£500k	18 June 2018	
	FW	(Egypt) Mostafa Afroto	(Oman) Saham	End of loan	30 June 2018	
	FW	(Egypt) Mohamed El Fil	(Egypt) Kafr El Sheikh	End of loan	30 June 2018	
34	DF	(Ghana) Abdul Wahab Annan	(Ghana) Berekum Chelsea	Undisclosed	27 July 2018	
29	FW	(Egypt) Alaa Salama	(Egypt) Al Merreikh	E£750k	15 December 2018	
17	FW	(Egypt) Ahmed Raouf	(Egypt) Petrojet	Undisclosed	31 December 2018	
11	FW	(Egypt) Hamada Nasser	(Egypt) Haras El Hodoud	Undisclosed	8 January 2019	
25	MF	(Egypt) Mahmoud Abdel Naby	(Egypt) MS Minyat Samanoud	Undisclosed	8 January 2019	
6	MF	(Egypt) Ahmed Magdy	(Egypt) Al Ittihad	Undisclosed	29 January 2019	

==== Loans in ====
#	Position	Player	Loaned from	Date	Loan expires	Source
14	FW	(Egypt) Mohamed Mosaad	(Egypt) Misr Lel Makkasa	3 June 2018	30 June 2019	
10	FW	(Egypt) Walid Hassan	(Egypt) Al Masry	26 July 2018	31 December 2018	
77	FW	(Egypt) Mohamed Hamdy	(Egypt) Zamalek U-23	30 July 2018	30 June 2019	
	FW	(Palestine) Hamed Hamdan	(Egypt) Pyramids	31 January 2019	30 June 2020	
	DF	(Egypt) Ehab Samir	(Egypt) Al Mokawloon Al Arab	31 January 2019	30 June 2019	

=== Transfers out ===
Position	Player	Transferred to	Fee	Date	Source
FW	(Egypt) Islam Roshdi	(Egypt) El Gouna	Free transfer	1 June 2018	
DF	(Egypt) Louay Wael	(Egypt) El Gouna	Free transfer	2 June 2018	
MF	(Egypt) Mohamed Mohsen Leila	(Egypt) El Gouna	Free transfer	4 June 2018	
DF	(Egypt) Ahmed El Aash	(Kuwait) Al Fahaheel	Free transfer	9 June 2018	
FW	(Egypt) Ahmed Sherweda	(Egypt) Nogoom	Free transfer	24 June 2018	
DF	(Egypt) Mahmoud Rizk	(Egypt) Al Ittihad	Free transfer	25 June 2018	
DF	(Egypt) Osama Mohamed	Retired		30 June 2018	
FW	(Zimbabwe) Abbas Amidu	Released		30 June 2018	
FW	(Egypt) Mostafa Afroto	Released		30 June 2018	
MF	(Egypt) Youssef Alaa	(Egypt) Al Ahly U-23	End of loan	30 June 2018	
MF	(Nigeria) Emeka Eze	(Egypt) Al Nasr Lel Taa'den	End of loan	30 June 2018	
FW	(Egypt) Khaled Kamar	(Egypt) Zamalek	End of loan	30 June 2018	
FW	(Egypt) Mohamed Khalifa	(Egypt) Al Merreikh	Free transfer	20 July 2018	
MF	(Egypt) Mohamed Essam	(Poland) Górnik Łęczna	Free transfer	26 July 2018	
FW	(Egypt) Ahmed El Saidy	(Egypt) FC Masr	Free transfer	27 July 2018	
FW	(Nigeria) Solomon Okuruket	(Iraq) Al Quwa Al Jawiya	Undisclosed	14 January 2019	
MF	(Egypt) Abdel Aziz Moussa	(Egypt) Al Mokawloon Al Arab	Undisclosed	30 January 2019	

==== Loans out ====
Position	Player	Loaned to	Date	Loan expires	Source
FW	(Egypt) Mohamed El Fil	(Egypt) Aswan	5 June 2018	30 June 2019	
FW	(Egypt) Mohamed Maged	(Jordan) Al Faisaly	31 January 2019	30 June 2019	

== Friendly matches ==
Win Draw Loss

28 August 2018	El Entag El Harby (Egypt)	1–1	(Iraq) Al Shorta	Cairo, Egypt
16:00 CAT (UTC+2)	?? (??)	Report	?? (??)	Stadium: War Factories Stadium

13 October 2018	El Entag El Harby (Egypt)	2–1	(Egypt) El Dakhleya	Cairo, Egypt
15:00 CAT (UTC+2)	Owoboskini (??); Okuruket (??)	Report	Salama (??)	Stadium: War Factories Stadium

28 October 2018	El Dakhleya (Egypt)	5–3	(Egypt) El Entag El Harby	Cairo, Egypt
15:00 CAT (UTC+2)	?? (??); ?? (??); ?? (??); ?? (??); ?? (??)	Report	?? (??); ?? (??); ?? (??)	Stadium: Police Academy Stadium

7 January 2019	El Entag El Harby (Egypt)	1–2	(Egypt) Ceramica Cleopatra	Cairo, Egypt
15:00 CAT (UTC+2)	?? (??)	Report	Hussein 12'; Yassin 67'	Stadium: War Factories Stadium

== Competitions ==
=== Overview ===
Competition	First match	Last match	Starting round	Final position	Record							
Competition	First match	Last match	Starting round	Final position	Pld	W	D	L	GF	GA	GD	Win %
Egyptian Premier League	1 August 2018	3 June 2019	Matchday 1	13th	34	8	14	12	36	44	−8	23.53
Egypt Cup	8 October 2018	23 October 2018	Round of 32	Round of 16	2	1	0	1	2	2	+0	50.00
Total					36	9	14	13	38	46	−8	25.00

Source: Competitions

=== Egyptian Premier League ===
==== League table ====
Pos	Team	Pld	W	D	L	GF	GA	GD	Pts
11	Al Ittihad	34	9	12	13	41	56	−15	39
12	Smouha	34	8	14	12	33	41	−8	38 (Note: Head-to-head points: Smouha 10, El Entag El Harby 8, El Gouna 7, Haras El Hodoud 5.)
13	El Entag El Harby	34	8	14	12	36	44	−8	38
14	El Gouna	34	8	14	12	38	52	−14	38
15	Haras El Hodoud	34	8	14	12	30	37	−7	38

Source: Soccerway
Rules for classification: 1) Points; 2) Head-to-Head points; 3) Head-to-Head goal difference; 4) Head-to-Head goals scored; 5) Head-to-Head away goals scored; 6) Goal difference; 7) Goals scored (Note: Head-to-head record is used only after all the matches between the teams in question have been played).

==== Results summary ====
Overall								Home						Away					
Pld	W	D	L	GF	GA	GD	Pts	W	D	L	GF	GA	GD	W	D	L	GF	GA	GD
34	8	14	12	36	44	−8	38	3	8	6	20	25	−5	5	6	6	16	19	−3

Source: Soccerway

==== Results by round ====
Round	1	2	3	4	5	6	7	8	9	10	11	12	13	14	15	16	17	18	19	20	21	22	23	24	25	26	27	28	29	30	31	32	33	34
Ground	H	A	A	H	A	H	A	A	A	H	A	H	A	H	A	H	A	A	H	H	A	H	A	H	H	H	A	H	A	H	A	H	A	H
Result	W	D	W	D	D	W	D	L	W	D	D	D	L	L	W	D	W	L	D	D	W	L	L	L	L	D	L	W	L	L	D	D	D	L
Position	2	5	4	4	5	5	3	5	2	2	1	2	4	5	4	4	4	5	5	5	5	6	7	7	7	8	9	8	8	8	11	11	11	13

Source: Soccerway
A = Away; H = Home; W = Win; D = Draw; L = Loss

==== Matches ====
1 August 2018 1	El Entag El Harby	2–1	Haras El Hodoud	Cairo
18:15 CAT (UTC+2)	Ragab 10'; Okuruket 89'	Report	Gamal 66' (pen.)	Stadium: Al Salam Stadium; Referee: Abdel Aziz El Sayed

8 August 2018 2	Pyramids	1–1	El Entag El Harby	Cairo
16:30 CAT (UTC+2)	Keno 75'	Report	Ragab 43'	Stadium: 30 June Stadium; Referee: Ahmed El Ghandour

14 August 2018 3	El Dakhleya	0–1	El Entag El Harby	Cairo
16:00 CAT (UTC+2)		Report	Annan 43'	Stadium: Police Academy Stadium; Referee: Said Hamza

26 August 2018 4	El Entag El Harby	0–0	El Gouna	Cairo
21:00 CAT (UTC+2)		Report		Stadium: Al Salam Stadium; Referee: Mahmoud Wafa

2 September 2018 5	Al Ahly	0–0	El Entag El Harby	Cairo
21:00 CAT (UTC+2)		Report		Stadium: Al Salam Stadium; Referee: Ibrahim Nour El Din

12 September 2018 6	El Entag El Harby	2–1	Petrojet	Cairo
15:30 CAT (UTC+2)	Kabonga 85'; Ragab 90+3'	Report	Vieira 59'	Stadium: Al Salam Stadium; Referee: Mahmoud Bassiouny

17 September 2018 7	Al Ittihad	1–1	El Entag El Harby	Alexandria
18:00 CAT (UTC+2)	Kamar 38'	Report	Ragab 80'	Stadium: Alexandria Stadium; Referee: Amin Omar

21 September 2018 8	Misr Lel Makkasa	2–1	El Entag El Harby	Cairo (Note: Misr Lel Makkasa v El Entag El Harby match was played at Osman Ahmed Osman Stadium in Cairo instead of Faiyum Stadium in Faiyum due to pitch status.)
18:00 CAT (UTC+2)	Voavy 55'; Antwi 64'	Report	Mo. Adel 62'	Stadium: Osman Ahmed Osman Stadium; Referee: Mohamed Adel

30 September 2018 9	Nogoom	0–1	El Entag El Harby	Cairo
18:00 CAT (UTC+2)		Report	Ragab 7'	Stadium: Petro Sport Stadium; Referee: Mohamed El Sabahy

5 October 2018 10	El Entag El Harby	2–2	ENPPI	Cairo
18:00 CAT (UTC+2)	Kabonga 23'; Diawara 34'	Report	El Halwani 4'; Kaoud 50'	Stadium: Al Salam Stadium; Referee: Mahmoud Bassiouny

18 October 2018 11	Tala'ea El Gaish	0–0	El Entag El Harby	Cairo
15:00 CAT (UTC+2)		Report		Stadium: Gehaz El Reyada Stadium; Referee: Mohamed Maarouf

2 November 2018 12	El Entag El Harby	2–2	Smouha	Cairo
17:30 CAT (UTC+2)	Shedid 64' (pen.); Owoboskini 76'	Report	Hassan 32'; Hamdy 35'	Stadium: Al Salam Stadium; Referee: Mahmoud El Banna

6 November 2018 13	Al Mokawloon Al Arab	2–0	El Entag El Harby	Cairo
20:00 CAT (UTC+2)	Talaat 39'; Hinestroza 66'	Report		Stadium: Osman Ahmed Osman Stadium; Referee: Gehad Grisha

10 November 2018 14	El Entag El Harby	1–2	Zamalek	Cairo
18:00 CAT (UTC+2)	Ragab 90+6' (pen.)	Report	Obama 16', 81'	Stadium: Al Salam Stadium; Referee: Mohamed Adel

21 November 2018 15	Ismaily	1–2	El Entag El Harby	Ismailia
20:00 CAT (UTC+2)	Taha 45+3' (pen.)	Report	Mosaad 36'; Diawara 40'	Stadium: Ismailia Stadium; Referee: Mohamed Maarouf

25 November 2018 16	El Entag El Harby	0–0	Al Masry	Cairo
20:00 CAT (UTC+2)		Report		Stadium: Al Salam Stadium; Referee: Said Hamza

11 December 2018 17	Wadi Degla	1–2	El Entag El Harby	Cairo
17:00 CAT (UTC+2)	Helal 75'	Report	Helal 7' (o.g.); Ghanam 86'	Stadium: Petro Sport Stadium; Referee: Nader Kamar El Dawla

23 December 2018 18	Haras El Hodoud	2–1	El Entag El Harby	Alexandria
17:00 CAT (UTC+2)	Moses 38'; El Sheikh 82'	Report	Hamada 87'	Stadium: Haras El Hodoud Stadium; Referee: Mohamed Abbas

15 January 2019 19	El Entag El Harby	1–1	Pyramids	Cairo
17:00 CAT (UTC+2)	Owoboskini 40'	Report	Magdy 19' (pen.)	Stadium: Al Salam Stadium; Referee: Mehrez Melki (Tunisia)

23 January 2019 20	El Entag El Harby	2–2	El Dakhleya	Cairo
20:00 CAT (UTC+2)	El Henawy 18' (pen.); Diawara 64'	Report	Gaber 45+1'; Salama 76'	Stadium: Al Salam Stadium; Referee: Mahmoud El Banna

7 February 2019 21	El Gouna	2–3	El Entag El Harby	El Gouna
16:00 CAT (UTC+2)	Rayyan 45+3'; Hamdy 47'	Report	Owoboskini 2'; Kabonga 19'; Farouk 38'	Stadium: El Gouna Stadium; Referee: Mohamed Salama

16 February 2019 22	El Entag El Harby	0–1	Al Ahly	Cairo
19:00 CAT (UTC+2)		Report	El Solia 49'	Stadium: Petro Sport Stadium (Note: El Entag El Harby v Al Ahly match was played at Petro Sport Stadium instead of Al Salam Stadium due to maintenance.); Referee: Mohamed El Hanafy

21 February 2019 23	Petrojet	1–0	El Entag El Harby	Suez
15:00 CAT (UTC+2)	Zola 46'	Report		Stadium: Egyptian Army Stadium; Referee: Mabrouk Nabil

3 March 2019 25	El Entag El Harby	1–3	Misr Lel Makkasa	Cairo
16:00 CAT (UTC+2)	El Badry 27'	Report	Ashour 13'; Gaber 32'; Antwi 59'	Stadium: Gehaz El Reyada Stadium (Note: El Entag El Harby v Misr Lel Makkasa match was played at Gehaz El Reyada Stadium instead of Al Salam Stadium due to maintenance.); Referee: Ahmed El Ghandour

7 March 2019 (Note: El Entag El Harby v Al Ittihad match, originally scheduled to be played on 26 February 2019, was postponed due to conflicting with Al Ittihad v Al Hilal match in the Arab Club Champions Cup, which was set to be played on 25 February 2019. The match was later rescheduled to be played on 6 March 2019.) 24	El Entag El Harby	2–4	Al Ittihad	Cairo
19:00 CAT (UTC+2)	El Badry 45+2', 76' (pen.)	Report	Kamar 53' (pen.), 90+4'; Hamdy 55'; Manga 88'	Stadium: Petro Sport Stadium (Note: El Entag El Harby v Al Ittihad match was played at Petro Sport Stadium instead of Al Salam Stadium due to maintenance.); Referee: Mohamed Adel

15 March 2019 26	El Entag El Harby	1–1	Nogoom	Cairo
18:00 CAT (UTC+2)	Mosaad 15'	Report	Omoyele 9'	Stadium: Petro Sport Stadium (Note: El Entag El Harby v Nogoom match was played at Petro Sport Stadium instead of Al Salam Stadium due to maintenance.); Referee: Mahmoud El Banna

2 April 2019 27	ENPPI	1–0	El Entag El Harby	Cairo
17:00 CAT (UTC+2)	Shoukry 9'	Report		Stadium: Petro Sport Stadium; Referee: Ahmed Hamdy

6 April 2019 28	El Entag El Harby	2–1	Tala'ea El Gaish	Cairo
15:00 CAT (UTC+2)	Shedid 53' (pen.); Lala 84'	Report	Samir 62'	Stadium: Police Academy Stadium (Note: El Entag El Harby v Tala'ea El Gaish match was played at Police Academy Stadium instead of Al Salam Stadium due to maintenance.); Referee: Mohamed El Sabahy

12 April 2019 29	Smouha	2–0	El Entag El Harby	Alexandria
17:30 CAT (UTC+2)	Reda 12' (pen.); Farid 19'	Report		Stadium: Haras El Hodoud Stadium (Note: Smouha v El Entag El Harby match was played at Haras El Hodoud Stadium instead of Borg El Arab Stadium due to pitch status.); Referee: Mohamed El Hanafy

19 April 2019 30	El Entag El Harby	1–2	Al Mokawloon Al Arab	Cairo
17:30 CAT (UTC+2)	Shedid 45+3' (pen.)	Report	Hinestroza 37'; Magli 45'	Stadium: Petro Sport Stadium (Note: El Entag El Harby v Al Mokawloon Al Arab match was played at Petro Sport Stadium instead of Al Salam Stadium due to maintenance.); Referee: Tarek Magdy

10 May 2019 32	El Entag El Harby	0–0	Ismaily	Cairo
22:00 CAT (UTC+2)		Report		Stadium: Police Academy Stadium (Note: El Entag El Harby v Ismaily match was played at Police Academy Stadium instead of Al Salam Stadium due to maintenance.); Referee: Gehad Grisha

21 May 2019 33	Al Masry	2–2	El Entag El Harby	Suez (Note: Al Masry v El Entag El Harby match was played at the Egyptian Army Stadium in Suez instead of Al Masry Club Stadium in Port Said due to security concerns.)
22:00 CAT (UTC+2)	Ragab 7'; Wadi 15'	Report	El Henawy 30' (pen.); Lala 35'	Stadium: Egyptian Army Stadium; Referee: Mohamed El Sabahy

30 May 2019 (Note: Zamalek v El Entag El Harby match, originally scheduled to be played on 1 May 2019, was postponed due to conflicting with Zamalek v Étoile du Sahel match in the CAF Confederation Cup, which was set to be played on 28 April 2019. The match was later rescheduled to be played on 15 May 2019. However the match was postponed again on 13 May 2019 following a request made by Zamalek. The match was later once again rescheduled to be played on 30 May 2019.) 31	Zamalek	1–1	El Entag El Harby	Cairo
22:00 CAT (UTC+2)	Boutaïb 46'	Report	El Henawy 54' (pen.)	Stadium: Petro Sport Stadium; Referee: Anastasios Sidiropoulos (Greece)

3 June 2019 34	El Entag El Harby	1–2	Wadi Degla	Cairo
22:00 CAT (UTC+2)	Magdy 87'	Report	Helal 27' (pen.); Ndiaye 63'	Stadium: Police Academy Stadium (Note: El Entag El Harby v Wadi Degla match was played at Police Academy Stadium instead of Al Salam Stadium due to maintenance.); Referee: Balázs Berke (Hungary)

=== Egypt Cup ===
8 October 2018 Round of 32	El Entag El Harby	2–0	Ittihad El Shorta	Cairo
15:00 CAT (UTC+2)	Ragab 29'; Hamdy 52'	Report		Stadium: Al Salam Stadium; Referee: Mohamed Saber

23 October 2018 Round of 16	Zamalek	2–0 (a.e.t.)	El Entag El Harby	Alexandria (Note: Starting from round of 16, all matches will be played on stadiums selected by the Egyptian Football Association.)
18:00 CAT (UTC+2)	Alaa 102' (pen.); Abdel Aziz 108'	Report		Stadium: Borg El Arab Stadium; Referee: Ahmed El Ghandour

== Statistics ==
=== Appearances and goals ===
No.	Pos	Player	Egyptian Premier League		Egypt Cup		Total	
No.	Pos	Player	Apps	Goals	Apps	Goals	Apps	Goals
1	GK	(Egypt) Mohamed Moussa	0	0	0	0	0	0
2	DF	(Egypt) Mahmoud Adel	2	0	1	0	3	0
3	DF	(Egypt) Hesham Shehata	0+4	0	1+1	0	6	0
5	DF	(Egypt) Moaz El Henawy	21+1	3	1	0	23	3
6	MF	(Egypt) Ahmed Magdy	10+1	1	0	0	11	1
7	MF	(Egypt) Mahmoud Farag	9+6	3	1	0	16	3
8	DF	(Egypt) Abdel Rahman Farouk	18+3	1	1	0	22	1
9	FW	(Egypt) Mohamed Ragab	11+5	6	2	1	18	7
10	MF	(Egypt) Abdel Rahman Ramadan	13+4	0	2	0	19	0
11	FW	(Egypt) Karim Lala	11+5	2	0	0	16	2
12	DF	(Egypt) Ahmed Shedid	34	3	1	0	35	3
13	DF	(Egypt) Mahmoud El Badry	16+2	3	1	0	19	3
14	FW	(Egypt) Mohamed Mosaad	18+5	2	1+1	0	25	2
15	FW	(Egypt) Hamada Nasser	5+2	0	0	0	7	0
16	GK	(Egypt) Amer Mohamed	26	0	2	0	28	0
17	FW	(Egypt) Ahmed Raouf	4+1	0	0	0	5	0
18	FW	(Nigeria) James Owoboskini	23+5	3	0	0	28	3
19	DF	(Egypt) Ahmed Dowidar	7+1	0	0	0	8	0
20	MF	(Egypt) Mahmoud Hamada	28	1	0+1	0	29	1
21	MF	(Egypt) Mohamed Adel	12+8	1	1	0	21	1
22	DF	(Egypt) Sayed Shabrawy	5+5	0	1	0	11	0
23	FW	(Guinea) Moussa Diawara	27+2	3	1	0	30	3
24	GK	(Egypt) Ahmed Yehia	8	0	0	0	8	0
24	MF	(Egypt) Mahmoud Abdel Naby	1+1	0	0	0	2	0
29	FW	(Egypt) Alaa Salama	0+6	0	0	0	6	0
33	MF	(Egypt) Abdallah Rashed	2	0	0+1	0	3	0
34	DF	(Ghana) Abdul Wahab Annan	29+1	1	1	0	31	1
66	MF	(Egypt) Ghanam Mohamed	17+6	1	1+1	0	25	1
72	DF	(Egypt) Mohamed Hussein	4+2	0	1	0	7	0
77	FW	(Egypt) Mohamed Hamdy	0+1	0	1	1	2	1
88	MF	(Egypt) Mostafa El Gamal	0+5	0	1	0	6	0
98	FW	(Egypt) Abdel Aziz Abou El Wafa	1+1	0	0	0	2	0
Players transferred out during the season
4	MF	(Egypt) Abdel Aziz Moussa	7	0	0	0	7	0
10	FW	(Egypt) Walid Hassan	0+3	0	0	0	3	0
11	FW	(Nigeria) Solomon Okuruket	5+6	1	0	0	11	1
25	FW	(Egypt) Mohamed Maged	0+5	0	0+1	0	6	0

=== Goalscorers ===
Rank	Position	Name	Egyptian Premier League	Egypt Cup	Total
1	FW	(Egypt) Mohamed Ragab	6	1	7
2	DF	(Egypt) Mahmoud El Badry	3	0	3
2	FW	(Guinea) Moussa Diawara	3	0	3
2	MF	(Egypt) Mahmoud Farag	3	0	3
2	DF	(Egypt) Moaz El Henawy	3	0	3
2	FW	(Nigeria) James Owoboskini	3	0	3
2	DF	(Egypt) Ahmed Shedid	3	0	3
8	FW	(Egypt) Karim Lala	2	0	2
8	FW	(Egypt) Mohamed Mosaad	2	0	2
10	DF	(Egypt) Mohamed Adel	1	0	1
10	DF	(Ghana) Abdul Wahab Annan	1	0	1
10	DF	(Egypt) Abdel Rahman Farouk	1	0	1
10	MF	(Egypt) Mahmoud Hamada	1	0	1
10	FW	(Egypt) Mohamed Hamdy	0	1	1
10	MF	(Egypt) Ahmed Magdy	1	0	1
10	MF	(Egypt) Ghanam Mohamed	1	0	1
10	FW	(Nigeria) Solomon Okuruket	1	0	1
Own goal			1	0	1
Total			36	2	38

=== Clean sheets ===
Rank	Name	Egyptian Premier League	Egypt Cup	Total
1	(Egypt) Amer Mohamed	6	1	7
2	(Egypt) Ahmed Yehia	1	0	1
Total		7	1	8
