= 2015–16 Al Ittihad Alexandria Club season =

2015–16 season
- Chairman: (Egypt) Mahmoud Mashaly
- Manager: (Bulgaria) Stoycho Mladenov
- 2015-16 Egyptian League: ongoing
- 2015 Egypt Cup: Round 16 (ongoing)
Home colours	Away colours

The 2015–16 season was the 102nd season since the founding of Al Ittihad Alexandria Club in 1914. The club plays in the Egyptian Premier League and the Egypt Cup. The club is one of the oldest Egyptian clubs, celebrating its centenary in 2014 in front of Sporting CP.

== Month by month review ==
=== July ===
Finish the Union Club defeats season and put him in 14th place but managed despite the departure of a large number of players the club that wins over the Wadi Degla SC Club Cup in Egypt and went up to meet the winner of the match Zamalek Club and Haras El-Hodood SC.

== Current squad ==
Note: Flags indicate national team as defined under FIFA eligibility rules; some limited exceptions apply. Players may hold more than one non-FIFA nationality.

No.	Pos.	Nation	Player
1	GK	EGY	El-Hany Soliman
3	DF	EGY	Hesham Shehata
4	MF	EGY	Abdel Rahman Farouk
5	DF	EGY	Ahmad El-Sayed
7	MF	EGY	Kabonga
8	DF	EGY	Mohamed Adel
9	FW	EGY	Tarek Salim
10	MF	EGY	Ramzi Khaled
12	MF	EGY	Mahmoud Bazid
13	MF	EGY	Ahmed Alalfy
14	MF	EGY	Karim Mansh
15	MF	EGY	Obama (on loan from Zamalek SC)
16	MF	EGY	Mostafa Gaber

No.	Pos.	Nation	Player
17	DF	EGY	Basem Eid
19	FW	EGY	Mohamed El-Shaarawy
20	DF	EGY	Hani Saied
21	DF	EGY	Ahmed Naser
22	MF	EGY	Ashour El-Adham
23	GK	EGY	Mahmoud Al Sayed
24	DF	EGY	Amr Nabil
28	DF	EGY	Bazoka (on loan from Zamalek SC)
30	DF	EGY	Sayed Elshabrawi
33	FW	EGY	Akram Abd Rabo
35	MF	EGY	Biso
38	FW	ZAM	Patrick Ngoma

=== Out on loan ===
Note: Flags indicate national team as defined under FIFA eligibility rules; some limited exceptions apply. Players may hold more than one non-FIFA nationality.

No.	Pos.	Nation	Player

=== Youth academy squad ===
Note: Flags indicate national team as defined under FIFA eligibility rules; some limited exceptions apply. Players may hold more than one non-FIFA nationality.

No.	Pos.	Nation	Player
39	GK	EGY	Amr Khalil
32	DF	EGY	Mahmoud Shabaan
35	MF	EGY	Kamis Hosni

No.	Pos.	Nation	Player
36	FW	EGY	Hassan Tarek
33	FW	EGY	Akram Abd Rabo

=== In ===
==== Summer ====
No.	Pos	Player	Transferred From	Fee	Date	Source
18	LB	(Egypt) Ahmed Mohsen	(Egypt) Ghazl Domyat	Free	1 July 2015	
—	MF	(Egypt) Shawki Fathi	(Egypt) Tanta	Free	1 July 2015	
—	MF	(Egypt) Ahmed Alalfy	(Egypt) Al Sharkeyah	Free	1 July 2015	
—	MF	(Egypt) Karim Mansh	(Egypt) Alassiouty Sport	Free	13 July 2015	
—	MF	(Egypt) Kabonga	(Egypt) El-Raja	Free	14 July 2015	
—	FW	(Egypt) Tarek Salim	(Egypt) El-Raja	Free	14 July 2015	
—	DF	(Egypt) Amr Nabil	(Egypt) El-Raja	Free	14 July 2015	
—	FW	(Benin) Jaques Bisan	(Tunisia) ES Zarzis	$100,000	16 July 2015	
—	MF	(Egypt) Ibrahim Hassan	(Egypt) Al-Sekka Al-Hadid	-	16 July 2015	
—	FW	(Zambia) Patrick Ngoma	(Zambia) Red Arrows		29 July 2015	
—	MF	(Egypt) Mohamed Khalaf	(Egypt) Mokawloon SC		29 July 2015	
—	DF	(Egypt) Mohamed Said	(Egypt) Petrojet		29 July 2015	
—	MF	(Egypt) Ahmed Abdel-Ghany	(Egypt) Petrojet		29 July 2015	

=== Out ===
==== Summer ====
No.	Pos	Player	Transferred To	Fee	Date	Source
4	DF	(Egypt) Mohamed Samir	(Egypt) El Mokawloon SC	Free	14 July 2015	
7	FW	(Egypt) Mohamed Hamdy Zaky	(Egypt) Al Ahly SC	Free	16 July 2015	
11	MF	(Egypt) Amr Warda	(Egypt) Al Ahly SC	Free	16 July 2015	
13	MF	(Egypt) Osama El-Azab	(Egypt) Al-Masry SC	Free	16 July 2015	
22	MF	(Egypt) Said Mohamed Otta	(Egypt) Al-Masry SC	Free	16 July 2015	
25	MF	(Egypt) Hossam Hassan	(Egypt) Al-Masry SC	Free	16 July 2015	
34	MF	(Egypt) Islam Saleh	(Egypt) Wadi Degla SC	Free	14 July 2015	
37	MF	(Egypt) Shika	(Egypt) Zamalek SC	Free	14 July 2015	
28	DF	(Egypt) Mohamed El Abdrazak	(Egypt) Zamalek SC	Free	14 July 2015	
1	GK	(Egypt) Ibrahim Farag	(Egypt) Al-Sayd Sporting Club	Free	14 July 2015	
16	GK	(Egypt) Ali Farag	(Egypt) Smouha SC	Free	14 July 2015	
12	DF	(Egypt) Fathi Mabrouk	(Egypt) El Mokawloon SC	Free	25 July 2015	
9	DF	(Egypt) Ramy Adel	(Egypt) El Mokawloon SC	Free	25 July 2015	
14	MF	(Egypt) Alaa Kamal	(Egypt) El-Entag El-Harby SC	Free	31 July 2015	

== Egypt Cup ==
15 January 2015 Round of 32	Al-Masry SC	0 – 0 (4–5 p)	El Ittihad Alexandria	Ismaïlia
12:30 UTC+2				Stadium: Ismailia Stadium
	Penalties
	Abdel Hakim (penalty scored); Raouf (penalty scored); El Shahat (penalty scored); Abdel Aal (penalty missed); Samir (penalty scored); Mousa (penalty missed)		(penalty missed) Samir; (penalty scored) R. Adel; (penalty scored) Mabrouk; (penalty scored) Farouk; (penalty scored) Eid; (penalty scored) Boughanmi

23 July Round of 16	Al Ittihad	1–0	Wadi Degla	Alexandria
17:30	Kamal 62'			Stadium: Alexandria Stadium

18 August 2015 Quarter final	El Ittihad	0 – 0 (2–4 p)	Zamalek	Alexandria
19:30 UTC+2				Stadium: Alexandria Stadium; Referee: Samir Othman
	Penalties
	Khaled (penalty missed); Farouk (penalty missed); Shehata (penalty scored); Adel (penalty scored)		(penalty scored) M. Ibrahim; (penalty scored) Kahraba; (penalty missed) Salah; (penalty scored) Hamed; (penalty scored) Mekky
