= 2022–23 Ghazl El Mahalla SC season =

Ghazl El Mahalla SC
2022–23 season
- Chairman: Osama Khalil
- Head coach: Nikodimos Papavasiliou (until 8 January); Abdel Baqi Gamal (from 8 January until 27 April); Reda Shehata (from 27 April)
- Stadium: Ghazl El Mahalla Stadium
- Egyptian Premier League: 17th (relegated)
- Egypt Cup: Round of 32
- EFA Cup: Round of 16
- Top goalscorer: League: Ahmed El Sheikh (9); All: Ahmed El Sheikh (9)

The 2022–23 Ghazl El Mahalla SC season was the club's 87th season in existence and the third consecutive season in the top flight of Egyptian football. In addition to the domestic league, Ghazl El Mahalla participated in this season's editions of the Egypt Cup and the EFA Cup.

== Players ==
=== First-team squad ===
Note: Flags indicate national team as defined under FIFA eligibility rules; some limited exceptions apply. Players may hold more than one non-FIFA nationality.

No.	Pos.	Nation	Player
1	GK	EGY	Mahmoud Reda
2	DF	EGY	Mohamed Camacho
3	DF	EGY	Mahmoud Alaa
5	DF	EGY	Ibrahim Salah
6	DF	EGY	Hany Adel
7	FW	EGY	Hesham Balaha
8	MF	EGY	Ashraf El Sayed (captain)
9	FW	MLI	Malick Touré
10	MF	EGY	Ahmed El Sheikh
11	FW	CIV	Ibrahim Koné
12	MF	EGY	Ahmad El-Sayed
13	GK	EGY	Amr Shaaban
14	MF	EGY	Khaled El Akhmimi
15	DF	EGY	Khaled Sami
16	GK	EGY	Mahmoud El Hadary
17	DF	EGY	Yehia Hamed

No.	Pos.	Nation	Player
18	DF	EGY	Sayed Shabrawy
19	FW	EGY	Ahmed Afifi
20	DF	EGY	Mohamed Bazoka
22	MF	EGY	Omar Maher
23	DF	EGY	Mostafa El Aash
24	DF	EGY	Ehab Samir
25	MF	TAN	Himid Mao
27	FW	EGY	Mohamed Ghalwesh
29	FW	EGY	Ahmed Ghoneim
30	DF	EGY	Moaz El Henawy
32	MF	EGY	Abdo Yehia
34	MF	EGY	Ahmed El Nadry
35	DF	EGY	Mohamed Abdelkader
36	MF	EGY	Amir Ismail
40	FW	EGY	Abdelrahman Atef
77	MF	EGY	Hossam Hassan

== Transfers ==
=== In ===
No.	Pos	Player	Transferred from	Fee	Date	Source
28	GK	(Egypt) Ahmed Maihoub	(Egypt) Wadi Degla	Undisclosed	1 September 2022	
19	MF	(Egypt) Karim Mostafa	(Egypt) Al Mokawloon Al Arab	Free	22 September 2022	
	MF	(Egypt) Salah Atef	(Egypt) ENPPI	Free	24 September 2022	
	MF	(Egypt) Youssef Alesh	(Egypt) Youth Center Kom Hamada	LE 250,000	29 September 2022	
44	MF	(Nigeria) Gabriel Orok	(Nigeria) Enyimba	Undisclosed	10 October 2022	
	MF	(Egypt) Ahmed El Geaidy	Free transfer		10 October 2022	
	FW	(Egypt) Hazem Morsi	(Egypt) Ismaily	Loan	22 January 2023	

=== Out ===
No.	Pos	Player	Transferred to	Fee	Date	Source
	DF	(Egypt) Yehia Hamed	(Egypt) Tala'ea El Gaish	LE 1,250,000	22 September 2022	
	MF	(Egypt) Hesham Balaha	(Egypt) Future	€428,000	27 September 2022	
21	FW	(Madagascar) Paulin Voavy	Contract termination		1 January 2023	

== Pre-season and friendlies ==
Win Draw Loss Fixtures

9 October 2022 Friendly	Ghazl El Mahalla (Egypt)	0–1	(Egypt) Haras El Hodoud
			Coco

8 November 2022 Friendly	Ghazl El Mahalla (Egypt)	2–0	(Egypt) El Mansoura	El Mahalla El Kubra
	Ahmed El Geaidy; El Sheikh			Stadium: Ghazl El Mahalla Stadium

13 January 2023 Friendly	Ghazl El Mahalla (Egypt)	3–1	(Egypt) Arab El Raml

== Competitions ==
=== Overview ===
Competition	First match	Last match	Starting round	Final position	Record							
Competition	First match	Last match	Starting round	Final position	Pld	W	D	L	GF	GA	GD	Win %
Egyptian Premier League	20 October 2022	14 July 2023	Matchday 1	17th	34	8	9	17	26	47	−21	23.53
Egypt Cup	28 May 2023		Round of 32	Round of 32	1	0	0	1	2	3	−1	0.00
EFA Cup	19 November 2022	20 March 2023	Preliminary round	Round of 16	2	0	2	0	1	1	+0	0.00
Total					37	8	11	18	29	51	−22	21.62

Source: Soccerway

=== Egyptian Premier League ===
==== League table ====
Pos	Team	Pld	W	D	L	GF	GA	GD	Pts	Qualification or relegation
14	Tala'ea El Gaish	34	8	12	14	33	45	−12	36	
15	El Dakhleya	34	7	14	13	32	43	−11	35	
16	Aswan (R)	34	8	9	17	31	45	−14	33 (Note: Tied on head-to-head points (3) and on head-to-head goal difference (0). Overall goal difference: Aswan −14, Ghazl El Mahalla −21.)	Relegation to Second Division A
17	Ghazl El Mahalla (R)	34	8	9	17	26	47	−21	33	Relegation to Second Division A
18	Haras El Hodoud (R)	34	5	10	19	21	45	−24	25	Relegation to Second Division A

Source: Soccerway
Rules for classification: 1) Points; 2) Head-to-head points; 3) Head-to-head goal difference; 4) Goal difference; 5) Goals scored; 6) Play-off.
(R) Relegated

==== Results summary ====
Overall								Home						Away					
Pld	W	D	L	GF	GA	GD	Pts	W	D	L	GF	GA	GD	W	D	L	GF	GA	GD
34	8	9	17	26	47	−21	33	6	3	8	15	23	−8	2	6	9	11	24	−13

Source: worldfootball

==== Results by round ====
Round	1	2	3	4	5	6	7	8	9	10	11	12	13	14	15	16	17	18	19	20	21	22	23	24	25	26	27	28	29	30	31	32	33	34
Ground	A	H	A	H	A	H	H	A	H	A	H	A	H	A	H	A	H	H	A	H	A	H	A	A	H	A	H	A	H	A	H	A	H	A
Result	D	W	W	W	W	L	W	L	D	D	L	L	W	D	W	D	L	L	D	L	L	W	L	L	L	L	L	D	L	L	D	L	D	L
Position	6	5	4	3	2	4	3	5	6	5	5	7	6	7	7	7	7	7	7	7	10	8	8	10	10	12	13	13	15	15	16	17	16	17

Source: worldfootball
A = Away; H = Home; W = Win; D = Draw; L = Loss

==== Matches ====
The league fixtures were announced on 9 October 2022.

20 October 2022 1	Al Mokawloon Al Arab	1–1	Ghazl El Mahalla	Cairo
15:00 EST (UTC+2)	Farid 51'	Report	Abou El Saoud 61' (o.g.)	Stadium: Osman Ahmed Osman Stadium; Referee: Mohamed Al Kalawy

24 October 2022 2	Ghazl El Mahalla	2–1	Ismaily	El Mahalla El Kubra
15:00 EST (UTC+2)	El Sheikh 12'; Orok 75'	Report	Morsi 87'	Stadium: Ghazl El Mahalla Stadium; Referee: Ahmed Hamdi

29 October 2022 3	Aswan	0–1	Ghazl El Mahalla	Aswan
15:00 EST (UTC+2)		Report	El Sheikh 90'	Stadium: Aswan Stadium; Referee: Ahmed Gamal

30 November 2022 5	Al Ittihad	0–2	Ghazl El Mahalla	Alexandria
19:00 EST (UTC+2)		Report	Voavy 31'; El Sheikh 40'	Stadium: Alexandria Stadium; Referee: Ahmed Ghandour

7 December 2022 6	Ghazl El Mahalla	0–2	Al Ahly	El Mahalla El Kubra
17:00 EST (UTC+2)		Report	Tau 17'; Bruno Sávio 30'	Stadium: Ghazl El Mahalla Stadium; Referee: Mohamed El Hanafi

11 December 2022 4	Ghazl El Mahalla	2–1	El Dakhleya	El Mahalla El Kubra
14:45 EST (UTC+2)	El Sheikh 23' (pen.); El Henawy 82' (pen.)	Report	Fekri 27'	Stadium: Ghazl El Mahalla Stadium; Referee: Mahmoud Wafa

14 December 2022 7	Ghazl El Mahalla	3–2	Tala'ea El Gaish	El Mahalla El Kubra
14:45 EST (UTC+2)	El Henawy 45+1'; El Sheikh 70', 74'	Report	Samir 11' (pen.); Mohareb 37'	Stadium: Ghazl El Mahalla Stadium; Referee: Mohamed Al Ghazi

19 December 2022 8	Future	1–0	Ghazl El Mahalla	Cairo
17:00 EST (UTC+2)	Ali 18'	Report	Mkami (yellow card) 66'; El Sheikh (yellow card) 82'	Stadium: Al Salam Stadium; Referee: Mahmoud El Banna

24 December 2022 9	Ghazl El Mahalla	0–0	Pharco	El Mahalla El Kubra
17:00 EST (UTC+2)	Mkami (yellow card) 60'	Report		Stadium: Ghazl El Mahalla Stadium; Referee: Sayed Munir

30 December 2022 10	Smouha	0–0	Ghazl El Mahalla	Alexandria
17:00 EST (UTC+2)	Boateng (yellow card) 34'	Report	Al Aash (yellow card) 46'; Samir (yellow card) 74'	Stadium: Alexandria Stadium; Referee: Mohammad Sabahi

3 January 2023 11	Ghazl El Mahalla	0–3	Ceramica Cleopatra	El Mahalla El Kubra
14:45 EST (UTC+2)	El Henawy (yellow card) 51'; Mkami (yellow card) 60'	Report	Ramadan (yellow card) 35'; Ibrahim 54' (pen.); Metwaly (yellow card) 80'; Rayan 90+2'; El Armouty 90+4'	Stadium: Ghazl El Mahalla Stadium; Referee: Abdelaziz El Sayed

7 January 2023 12	Pyramids	4–0	Ghazl El Mahalla	Cairo
14:45 EST (UTC+2)	Sobhi 41'; Touré 44'; Hamdy (yellow card) 65'; Lakay 67'; Adel 80'	Report	Samir (yellow card) 40'	Stadium: 30 June Stadium; Referee: Mohamed Salama

12 January 2023 13	Ghazl El Mahalla	1–0	ENPPI	El Mahalla El Kubra
17:00 EST (UTC+2)	Orok 39'	Report		Stadium: Ghazl El Mahalla Stadium; Referee: Nader Kamar

20 January 2023 14	Al Masry	1–1	Ghazl El Mahalla	Borg El Arab
17:00 EST (UTC+2)	El Sayed (yellow card) 38'; Grendo 49'; Deghmoum (yellow card) 67'; Moussa (yellow card) 77'	Report	Bazoka (yellow card) 41'; El Henawy (yellow card) 55'; El Sheikh 78' (pen.)	Stadium: Borg El Arab Stadium; Referee: Mohammad Sabahi

24 January 2023 15	Ghazl El Mahalla	2–1	Zamalek	El Mahalla El Kubra
17:00 EST (UTC+2)	Orok 4'; El Nadry 19'	Report	Zizo 62' (pen.)	Stadium: Ghazl El Mahalla Stadium; Referee: Abdelaziz El Sayed

30 January 2023 16	National Bank	2–2	Ghazl El Mahalla	Cairo
17:00 EST (UTC+2)	Kaoud 4'; Yasser 65'	Report	Orok 16'; Koné 90+7'	Stadium: Cairo International Stadium; Referee: Hesham El Kady

5 February 2023 17	Ghazl El Mahalla	1–2	Haras El Hodoud	El Mahalla El Kubra
14:45 EST (UTC+2)	El Sheikh 90+4'	Report	Felix 15'; Ziko 44'	Stadium: Ghazl El Mahalla Stadium; Referee: Sabri Ibrahim

10 February 2023 18	Ghazl El Mahalla	0–3	Al Mokawloon Al Arab	El Mahalla El Kubra
18:00 EST (UTC+2)		Report	Khaled 1'; Ochaya 63'; Saviola 90+5'	Stadium: Ghazl El Mahalla Stadium; Referee: Ahmed Gamal

21 February 2023 19	Ismaily	1–1	Ghazl El Mahalla	Ismailia
17:00 EST (UTC+2)	Hamdi 54'	Report	Atef 90+6'	Stadium: Ismailia Stadium; Referee: Nader Qamar El-Dawla

27 February 2023 20	Ghazl El Mahalla	1–2	Aswan	El Mahalla El Kubra
15:00 EST (UTC+2)	Ekpenyong 74'	Report	Zaky 25'; Arafat 69'	Stadium: Ghazl El Mahalla Stadium; Referee: Ali El Said

6 March 2023 21	El Dakhleya	2–1	Ghazl El Mahalla	Cairo
15:00 EST (UTC+2)	Fekri 19'; El Banouby 46'	Report	El Sheikh 87' (pen.)	Stadium: Petrosport Stadium; Referee: Mohamed Salama

31 March 2023 22	Ghazl El Mahalla	2–0	Al Ittihad	El Mahalla El Kubra
21:15 EST (UTC+2)	Ekpenyong 22'; Morsi 89'	Report		Stadium: Ghazl El Mahalla Stadium; Referee: Tarek Magdy

5 April 2023 23	Al Ahly	3–0	Ghazl El Mahalla	Cairo
21:15 EST (UTC+2)	Al Aash 42' (o.g.); Maâloul 58' (pen.); Sherif 90+1'	Report		Stadium: Cairo International Stadium; Referee: Mahmoud El Banna

12 April 2023 25	Ghazl El Mahalla	0–1	Future	El Mahalla El Kubra
21:15 EST (UTC+2)		Report	Mohamed 57'	Stadium: Ghazl El Mahalla Stadium; Referee: Ibrahim Adel

19 April 2023 26	Pharco	3–1	Ghazl El Mahalla	Borg El Arab
21:15 EST (UTC+2)	Fouad 42'; Hamada 66'; El Sageery 70'	Report	Atef 82'	Stadium: Borg El Arab Stadium; Referee: Mohamed El Atabani

26 April 2023 24	Tala'ea El Gaish	1–0	Ghazl El Mahalla	Cairo
17:00 EST (UTC+2)	Joules 6'	Report		Stadium: Gehaz El Reyada Stadium; Referee: Ahmed Ghandour

2 May 2023 27	Ghazl El Mahalla	0–2	Smouha	El Mahalla El Kubra
19:00 EST (UTC+3)		Report	Hassan 17'; Boateng 85'	Stadium: Ghazl El Mahalla Stadium; Referee: Mohamed El Hanafi
Note: The game, which was initially slated for 26 April 2023, was postponed.

14 May 2023 28	Ceramica Cleopatra	0–0	Ghazl El Mahalla	Cairo
20:00 EST (UTC+3)		Report		Stadium: Cairo International Stadium; Referee: Mahmoud Ashour

21 May 2023 29	Ghazl El Mahalla	0–2	Pyramids	El Mahalla El Kubra
21:30 EST (UTC+3)		Report	Issa 29'; El Karti 45+2'	Stadium: Ghazl El Mahalla Stadium; Referee: Hisham Al-Falal

=== Egypt Cup ===
28 May 2023 Quarter-finals	Haras El Hodoud	3–2	Ghazl El Mahalla	Alexandria
19:00 EST (UTC+3)	Ben Wali 7'; Abdel Hakim 18', 69'		Orok 13', 22'	Stadium: Haras El Hodoud Stadium

=== EFA Cup ===
19 November 2022 Preliminary round	Aswan	0–0 (a.e.t.) (1–3 p)	Ghazl El Mahalla	Aswan
15:00 EST (UTC+2)		Report		Stadium: Aswan Stadium; Referee: Hesham El Kady
	Penalties
	Zaki (penalty scored); Fathy (penalty missed); Anani (penalty missed); Dilson (penalty missed)		(penalty scored) El-Henawy; (penalty missed) Bazoka; (penalty missed) Mao; (penalty scored) El Shabrawi; (penalty scored) Gaber

20 March 2023 Round of 16	Ghazl El Mahalla	1–1 (6–7 p)	Ismaily	El Mahalla El Kubra
16:00 EST (UTC+2)	Mao 42'		Chaouat 2'	Stadium: Ghazl El Mahalla Stadium; Referee: Mohamed Al-Ghazi
	Penalties
	El Sheikh (penalty scored); Samy (penalty scored); Mao (penalty scored); Mostafa (penalty scored); Gaber (penalty scored); Reda (penalty scored); El Nadry (penalty missed)		(penalty scored) El Mohamady; (penalty scored) Chaouat; (penalty scored) El Wahsh; (penalty scored) Desouki; (penalty scored) Madbouli; (penalty scored) Hamdy; (penalty scored) Annor
