= 2022–23 Pharco FC season =

Pharco FC
2022–23 season
- Manager: Nuno Almeida (until 17 December); Ehab Galal (from 17 December until 24 January); Tarek El Ashry (from 26 January)
- Stadium: Alexandria Stadium
- Egyptian Premier League: 9th
- Egypt Cup: Round of 16
- EFA Cup: Quarter-finals
- Top goalscorer: League: Rezki Hamroune (8); All: Rezki Hamroune (8)
- Biggest win: Pharco 3–0 Zamalek
- Biggest defeat: Pyramids 3–0 Pharco

The 2022–23 Pharco FC season was the club's 13th season in existence and the second consecutive season in the top flight of Egyptian football. In addition to the domestic league, Pharco participated in this season's editions of the Egypt Cup and the EFA Cup.

== Players ==
=== First-team squad ===
Note: Flags indicate national team as defined under FIFA eligibility rules; some limited exceptions apply. Players may hold more than one non-FIFA nationality.

No.	Pos.	Nation	Player
2	DF	EGY	Ahmed Abdelaziz
3	DF	EGY	Abdallah Bakri
4	DF	EGY	Ahmed Awad
6	MF	EGY	Gaber Kamel
7	MF	EGY	Hesham Fathallah
8	DF	EGY	Ramy Sabry
9	FW	EGY	Amr Gamal
11	FW	EGY	Mohamed Shika
13	GK	EGY	Mahmoud Al Sayed
14	MF	EGY	Mahmoud Hamada
15	MF	ALG	Rezki Hamroune
17	MF	GBS	Jefferson Encada
19	MF	EGY	Mahmoud Emad

No.	Pos.	Nation	Player
21	DF	TUN	Azmi Ghouma
22	FW	EGY	Ali Baheeg
23	MF	EGY	Ahmed El-Saghiri
24	MF	EGY	Ahmed El Bahrawi
25	GK	EGY	Mohamed Shika
27	MF	EGY	Ahmed Fouad
28	MF	NGR	Kingsley Sokari
29	FW	SDN	Seif Teiri
30	MF	EGY	Hassan Tarek
31	FW	EGY	Ahmed Sherif
32	MF	EGY	Walid Farag
50	MF	EGY	Marwan Magdy
51	DF	EGY	Yassin Marei

== Transfers ==
=== In ===
No.	Pos	Player	Transferred from	Fee	Date	Source
	DF	(Egypt) Mohamed Said	(Egypt) Tersana	Loan return	30 June 2022	
	MF	(Egypt) Mohamed Shika	(Egypt) El Qanah	Loan return	30 June 2022	
	MF	(Nigeria) Anthony Lokosa	(Spain) Almería B	Loan return	30 June 2022	
27	MF	(Egypt) Ahmed Fouad	(Egypt) Al Masry Salloum	Loan return	30 June 2022	
51	DF	(Egypt) Yassin Marei	(Egypt) Zamalek U21	€156,000	1 September 2022	

=== Out ===
No.	Pos	Player	Transferred to	Fee	Date	Source
	MF	(Nigeria) Anthony Lokosa	(Spain) Almería B		1 July 2022	
	DF	(Egypt) Mohamed Said	(Egypt) Tersana		29 July 2022	
1	GK	(Egypt) Mohamed Sobhy	(Egypt) Zamalek	Loan return	10 September 2022	
	MF	(Egypt) Alaa Salama	(Egypt) Aswan	Loan	7 January 2023	

== Pre-season and friendlies ==
Win Draw Loss

== Competitions ==
=== Overview ===
Competition	First match	Last match	Starting round	Final position	Record							
Competition	First match	Last match	Starting round	Final position	Pld	W	D	L	GF	GA	GD	Win %
Egyptian Premier League	18 October 2022	16 July 2023	Matchday 1	9th	34	9	15	10	31	34	−3	26.47
Egypt Cup	10 May 2023	23 June 2023	Round of 32	Round of 16	2	1	0	1	2	3	−1	50.00
EFA Cup	20 March 2023		Round of 16	Round of 16	1	0	1	0	2	2	+0	0.00
Total					37	10	16	11	35	39	−4	27.03

Source: Soccerway

=== Egyptian Premier League ===
==== League table ====
Pos	Team	Pld	W	D	L	GF	GA	GD	Pts
7	Al Mokawloon Al Arab	34	9	17	8	35	33	+2	44
8	Al Ittihad	34	12	7	15	36	43	−7	43
9	Pharco	34	9	15	10	31	34	−3	42 (Note: Head-to-head points: Pharco 6, Smouha 0.)
10	Smouha	34	10	12	12	36	43	−7	42
11	Ismaily	34	9	13	12	35	38	−3	40

Source: Soccerway
Rules for classification: 1) Points; 2) Head-to-head points; 3) Head-to-head goal difference; 4) Goal difference; 5) Goals scored; 6) Play-off.

==== Results summary ====
Overall								Home						Away					
Pld	W	D	L	GF	GA	GD	Pts	W	D	L	GF	GA	GD	W	D	L	GF	GA	GD
34	9	15	10	31	34	−3	42	7	5	5	21	18	+3	2	10	5	10	16	−6

Source: worldfootball

==== Results by round ====
Round	1	2	3	4	5	6	7	8	9	10	11	12	13	14	15	16	17	18	19	20	21	22	23	24	25	26	27	28	29	30	31	32	33	34
Ground	A	H	A	H	A	H	A	H	A	H	H	A	H	A	H	A	H	H	A	H	A	H	A	H	A	H	A	A	H	A	H	A	H	A
Result	D	W	D	D	L	D	L	L	D	L	D	W	D	L	L	W	W	W	D	W	D	D	D	W	L	W	D	D	W	D	L	L	L	D
Position	6	6	6	7	9	7	9	11	12	14	15	12	11	13	13	12	11	8	8	8	8	9	9											

Source: worldfootball
A = Away; H = Home; W = Win; D = Draw; L = Loss

==== Matches ====
The league fixtures were announced on 9 October 2022.

18 October 2022 1	National Bank	1–1	Pharco	Cairo
17:00 EST (UTC+2)	Bambo 17'	Report	Abdulaziz 90+6' (pen.)	Stadium: Cairo International Stadium; Referee: Mahmoud Nagi

26 October 2022 2	Pharco	1–0	Haras El Hodoud	Alexandria
17:00 EST (UTC+2)	Sherif 90+2'	Report		Stadium: Alexandria Stadium; Referee: Mostafa Othman

31 October 2022 2	Al Mokawloon Al Arab	0–0	Pharco	Cairo
19:00 EST (UTC+2)		Report		Stadium: Osman Ahmed Osman Stadium; Referee: Wael Farhan

23 November 2022 4	Pharco	1–1	Ismaily	Alexandria
17:00 EST (UTC+2)	Hamroune 48'	Report	Morsy 79'	Stadium: Alexandria Stadium; Referee: Mohamed Al Kalawy

1 December 2022 5	Aswan	1–0	Pharco	Aswan
14:45 EST (UTC+2)	Belhadji 31'	Report		Stadium: Aswan Stadium; Referee: Ibrahim Nour El Din

7 December 2022 6	Pharco	1–1	El Dakhleya	Alexandria
14:45 EST (UTC+2)	Sabri 7'	Report	Fawzy 68'	Stadium: Alexandria Stadium; Referee: Mohamed Abass

15 December 2022 7	Al Ittihad	1–0	Pharco	Alexandria
17:00 EST (UTC+2)	Mabululu 47'	Report		Stadium: Alexandria Stadium; Referee: Mostafa El Shahdi

20 December 2022 8	Pharco	1–2	Al Ahly	Alexandria
17:00 EST (UTC+2)	Sherif 36'	Report	Abdel Kader 30'; Sherif 90+7'	Stadium: Borg El Arab Stadium; Referee: Tarek Magdi

24 December 2022 9	Ghazl El Mahalla	0–0	Pharco	El Mahalla El Kubra
17:00 EST (UTC+2)		Report		Stadium: Ghazl El Mahalla Stadium; Referee: Sayed Munir

28 December 2022 10	Pharco	2–3	Future	Alexandria
17:00 EST (UTC+2)	Kamel 45+1'; Hamroune 87' (pen.)	Report	Mohsen 2'; Kamal 50', 59'	Stadium: Alexandria Stadium; Referee: Ahmed El Ghandour

4 January 2023 11	Pharco	1–1	Tala'ea El Gaish	Alexandria
17:00 EST (UTC+2)	Hamroune 19' (pen.); Sokari (yellow card) 86'	Report	A. Samir 13'; M. Samir (yellow card) 17'	Stadium: Alexandria Stadium; Referee: Mostafa Othman

8 January 2023 12	Smouha	0–2	Pharco	Alexandria
19:00 EST (UTC+2)		Report	Hamroune 37'; Gamal 45'	Stadium: Alexandria Stadium; Referee: Ibrahim Nour El Din

13 January 2023 13	Pharco	1–1	Ceramica Cleopatra	Alexandria
17:00 EST (UTC+2)	Abdulaziz 29' (pen.)	Report	Rayan 54'	Stadium: Alexandria Stadium; Referee: Mohamed El Atabani

19 January 2023 14	Pyramids	3–0	Pharco	Cairo
19:00 EST (UTC+2)	Fathy (yellow card) 43'; Fathi 45'; Adel 45+4'; Lakay (yellow card) 72'; Issa 90+3'	Report	Hamada (yellow card) 62'; Saeed (red card) 88'	Stadium: 30 June Stadium; Referee: Amin Omar

23 January 2023 15	Pharco	0–1	ENPPI	Alexandria
14:45 EST (UTC+2)		Report	Fawzi 90+9' (pen.)	Stadium: Alexandria Stadium; Referee: Mohammed Yousef

28 January 2023 16	Al Masry	1–2	Pharco	Alexandria
17:00 EST (UTC+2)	Grendo (yellow card) 43'; Ateia 80'; Eze (red card) 90+2'	Report	Hamroune 1', 45+5'; Fouad (yellow card) 16'; Saeed (yellow card) 77'; El Sageery (yellow card) 79'	Stadium: Borg El Arab Stadium; Referee: Ahmed Hamdi

6 February 2023 17	Pharco	3–0	Zamalek	Alexandria
17:00 EST (UTC+2)	Nagib 6'; Gamal 29'; Thierry 90+4'	Report		Stadium: Borg El Arab Stadium; Referee: Mohamed Al Kalawy

11 February 2023 18	Pharco	1–0	National Bank	Alexandria
17:00 EST (UTC+2)	Hamada 4'	Report		Stadium: Borg El Arab Stadium; Referee: Atef Hussein

21 February 2023 19	Haras El Hodoud	0–0	Pharco	Alexandria
19:00 EST (UTC+2)		Report		Stadium: Haras El Hodoud Stadium; Referee: Hisham Al-Falal

1 March 2023 20	Pharco	2–1	Al Mokawloon Al Arab	Alexandria
18:00 EST (UTC+2)	Hamroune 41'; Sabri 90+5' (pen.)	Report	Khaled 31'	Stadium: Borg El Arab Stadium; Referee: Mahmoud El Banna

8 March 2023 21	Ismaily	0–0	Pharco	Ismailia
18:00 EST (UTC+2)		Report		Stadium: Ismailia Stadium; Referee: Mohamed Adel

31 March 2023 22	Pharco	0–0	Aswan	Alexandria
21:15 EST (UTC+2)		Report		Stadium: Borg El Arab Stadium; Referee: Ahmed Nasser

4 April 2023 23	El Dakhleya	0–0	Pharco	Cairo
21:15 EST (UTC+2)		Report		Stadium: Petrosport Stadium; Referee: Ibrahim Nour El Din

10 April 2023 24	Pharco	3–2	Al Ittihad	Alexandria
21:15 EST (UTC+2)	Hamroune 22'; Baheeg 65'; Nagib 81'	Report	Mabululu 90+2', 90+4'	Stadium: Borg El Arab Stadium; Referee: Mohamed Al Kalawy

14 April 2023 25	Al Ahly	3–0	Pharco	Cairo
21:15 EST (UTC+2)	Metwalli 19'; Sherif 45+3'; Maâloul 90+7' (pen.)	Report		Stadium: Cairo International Stadium; Referee: Nader Kamar

19 April 2023 26	Pharco	3–1	Ghazl El Mahalla	Alexandria
21:15 EST (UTC+2)	Fouad 42'; Hamada 66'; El Sageery 70'	Report	Atef 82'	Stadium: Borg El Arab Stadium; Referee: Mohamed El Atabani

4 May 2023 27	Future	0–0	Pharco	Cairo
21:30 EST (UTC+3)		Report		Stadium: Al Salam Stadium; Referee: Hisham Al-Falal
Note: The game, which was initially slated for 26 April 2023, was postponed.

16 May 2023 28	Tala'ea El Gaish	2–2	Pharco	Cairo
21:30 EST (UTC+3)	Joules 2'; Fathallah 67'	Report	Bakri 33'; Gamal 90+3'	Stadium: Gehaz El Reyada Stadium; Referee: Mahmoud Nagi

23 May 2023 29	Pharco	1–0	Smouha	Alexandria
21:30 EST (UTC+2)		Report		Stadium: Borg El Arab Stadium

2 June 2023 30	Ceramica Cleopatra	0–0	Pharco	Cairo
19:00 EST (UTC+3)		Report		Stadium: Osman Ahmed Osman Stadium; Referee: Mahmoud Nagi

6 June 2023 31	Pharco	0–1	Pyramids	Borg El Arab
19:00 EST (UTC+3)	Hamroune (penalty missed) 38'	Report	Fathi 61'	Stadium: Borg El Arab Stadium; Referee: Mohamed El Hanafi

30 June 2023 32	ENPPI	2–1	Pharco	Cairo
19:00 EST (UTC+3)		Report		Stadium: Petrosport Stadium; Referee: Mohamed Kabil

9 July 2023 33	Pharco	0–3	Al Masry	Alexandria
20:30 EST (UTC+2)		Report		Stadium: Borg El Arab Stadium; Referee: Mohamed Kabil

16 July 2023 34	Zamalek	2–2	Pharco	Cairo
21:30 EST (UTC+3)		Report		Stadium: Cairo International Stadium; Referee: Mostafa El Shahdi

=== Egypt Cup ===
10 May 2023 Round of 32	Pharco	1–0	El Masria Lell Etesalat	Alexandria
19:00 EST (UTC+2)				Stadium: Borg El Arab Stadium

=== EFA Cup ===
20 March 2023 Round of 16	Al Ittihad	2–2 (7–6 p)	Pharco	Alexandria
19:00 EST (UTC+2)	Elkalamawy 48'; Mahmoud 72'		Emad 43' (pen.); Sabri (penalty missed) 90+7'; Sokari 90+7'	Stadium: Alexandria Stadium
