= 2024–25 Tala'ea El Gaish SC season =

Tala'ea El Gaish
2024–25 season
- Manager: Abdel Hamid Bassiouny
- Stadium: Gehaz El Reyada Stadium
- Egyptian Premier League: 13th
- Egypt Cup: Round of 16
- Egyptian League Cup: Group stage
- Top goalscorer: League: Godwin Chika (3); All: Godwin Chika (3)
- Biggest defeat: Haras El Hodoud 3–0 Tala'ea El Gaish
- All statistics correct as of 17 January 2025.

The 2024–25 season is the 28th season in Tala'ea El Gaish SC's history and the 21st consecutive season in the Premier League. In addition to the domestic league, Tala'ea El Gaish is set to compete in the domestic cup, and the Egyptian League Cup.

== Transfers ==
=== In ===
Date	Pos.	Player	From	Fee	Ref.
30 June 2024	DF	(Egypt) Mohamed Fathallah	(Saudi Arabia) Al-Jandal	Loan return	
9 September 2024	DF	(Egypt) Moaz El Henawy	(Egypt) El Dakhleya	Free	
9 September 2024	FW	(Egypt) Basem Morsy	(Egypt) Ismaily	Free	
8 October 2024	MF	(Egypt) Hamed El Gabry	(Egypt) Al Ittihad	Free	

=== Out ===
Date	Pos.	Player	To	Fee	Ref.
20 August 2024	FW	(Egypt) Mohamed Hamdy Zaky	(Egypt) Aswan	Loan return	
21 August 2024	MF	(Egypt) Mohamed Shehata	(Egypt) Zamalek	€195,000	
14 September 2024	DF	(Egypt) Mohamed Samir	(Egypt) ENPPI	Free	
1 October 2024	FW	(Egypt) Karim Halawa	(Egypt) Wadi Degla	Loan	
25 October 2024	MF	(Egypt) Ali El Zahdi	(Egypt) El Gouna	Free	

== Friendlies ==
7 October 2024 Friendly	Tala'ea El Gaish (Egypt)	1–0	(Egypt) Ghazl El Mahalla	Ismailia
		Report

9 October 2024 Friendly	Ismaily (Egypt)	2–1	(Egypt) Tala'ea El Gaish	Ismailia
	Farag; El Malawany		El Sheikh	Stadium: Ismailia Stadium

14 November 2024 Friendly	Tala'ea El Gaish (Egypt)	1–0	(Libya) Al Ahli Tripoli	Cairo
15:00 UTC+2	El Gabry	Report		Stadium: Gehaz El Reyada Stadium

5 December 2024 Friendly	Tala'ea El Gaish (Egypt)	9–0	(Egypt) Qaha SC	Cairo
		Report		Stadium: Gehaz El Reyada Stadium

8 December 2024 Friendly	Tala'ea El Gaish (Egypt)	1–1	(Egypt) Sinai Star	Cairo
				Stadium: Gehaz El Reyada Stadium

== Competitions ==
=== Overall record ===
Competition	First match	Last match	Starting round	Final position	Record							
Competition	First match	Last match	Starting round	Final position	Pld	W	D	L	GF	GA	GD	Win %
Egyptian Premier League	30 October 2024	30 May 2025	Matchday 1		9	3	2	4	7	11	−4	33.33
Egypt Cup	3 January 2025	17 January 2025	Round of 32	Round of 16	2	0	1	1	2	4	−2	0.00
Egyptian League Cup	12 December 2024		Group stage		1	0	1	0	1	1	+0	0.00
Total					12	3	4	5	10	16	−6	25.00

Last updated: 21 January 2025
Source: Competitions

=== Egyptian Premier League ===
==== Regular season ====
Pos	Team	Pld	W	D	L	GF	GA	GD	Pts	Qualification or relegation
8	Petrojet	17	5	7	5	17	18	−1	22	Qualification for the championship play-offs
9	Haras El Hodoud	17	6	4	7	17	19	−2	22	Qualification for the championship play-offs
10	Tala'ea El Gaish	17	5	6	6	13	18	−5	21	Qualification for the relegation play-offs
11	ZED	17	4	9	4	15	13	+2	21	Qualification for the relegation play-offs
12	Smouha	17	6	2	9	13	22	−9	20	Qualification for the relegation play-offs

Source: Soccerway (regular season)
Rules for classification: 1) Points; 2) Goal difference; 3) Goals scored.

===== Results summary =====
Overall								Home						Away					
Pld	W	D	L	GF	GA	GD	Pts	W	D	L	GF	GA	GD	W	D	L	GF	GA	GD
9	3	2	4	7	11	−4	11	0	2	3	2	6	−4	3	0	1	5	5	0

Last updated: 21 January 2025.

===== Results by round =====
Round	1	2	3	4	5	6	7	8	9
Ground	H	A	H	A	H	H	A	H	A
Result	L	W	D	W	L	D	L	L	W
Position	17	7	10	8	9	9			

Updated to match(es) played on 21 January 2025. Source:
A = Away; H = Home; W = Win; D = Draw; L = Loss

===== Matches =====
The league schedule was released on 19 October 2024.

30 October 2024 1	Tala'ea El Gaish	0–2	Al Masry	Suez
20:00 UTC+3	Mohareb (red card) 21'		Mohsen 52'; Hamada 87'	Stadium: Suez Stadium; Referee: Tarek Magdy

7 November 2024 2	Ghazl El Mahalla	2–3	Tala'ea El Gaish	El Mahalla El Kubra
17:00 UTC+2	Ben Hammouda 79', 90+5'		Fathy 14'; Chika 70' (pen.); El Sheikh 88'	Stadium: Ghazl El Mahalla Stadium; Referee: Amin Omar

23 November 2024 3	Tala'ea El Gaish	0–0	Smouha	Cairo
17:00 UTC+2				Stadium: Gehaz El Reyada Stadium; Referee: Abdel Aziz El-Sayed

30 November 2024 4	Al Ittihad	0–1	Tala'ea El Gaish	Alexandria
20:00 UTC+2			Omran 90+4'	Stadium: Alexandria Stadium; Referee: Ahmed El Ghandour

19 December 2024 5	Tala'ea El Gaish	0–1	Petrojet	Cairo
17:00 UTC+2			Mousa 32'	Stadium: Gehaz El Reyada Stadium; Referee: Nader Qamar Al-Dawla

24 December 2024 6	Tala'ea El Gaish	2–2	Zamalek	Cairo
20:00 UTC+2	Chika 35', 55'		Shehata 43'; Ashraf 45+4'	Stadium: Cairo Military Academy Stadium; Referee: Tarek Magdy

29 December 2024 7	Haras El Hodoud	3–0	Tala'ea El Gaish	Alexandria
17:00 UTC+2	Mohamed 23'; Karidioula 57'; Gouda 82'		Mao (red card) 90+5'	Stadium: Haras El Hodoud Stadium; Referee: Walid Abdelrazak

10 January 2025 8	Tala'ea El Gaish	0–1	Ceramica Cleopatra	Cairo
19:00 UTC+2			Kendouci 66'	Stadium: Gehaz El Reyada Stadium; Referee: Mahmoud El Banna

21 January 2025 9	ENPPI	0–1	Tala'ea El Gaish	Cairo
19:00 UTC+2				Stadium: Petrosport Stadium; Referee: Ahmed Nasser Abbas

==== Relegation Round ====
Pos	Team	Pld	W	D	L	GF	GA	GD	Pts
1	ZED	2	1	0	1	4	2	+2	24
2	El Gouna	2	2	0	0	4	1	+3	23
3	Tala'ea El Gaish	1	0	0	1	0	1	−1	21
4	Ghazl El Mahalla	2	1	0	1	1	3	−2	20
5	Smouha	2	0	0	2	0	3	−3	20

Updated to match(es) played on 11 April 2025. Source: Soccerway (relegation round)
Rules for classification: 1) Points; 2) Goal difference; 3) Goals scored; 4) Play-off tie.
(Note: Clubs qualified for this phase with the full regular season points they got, but without goals for or against)

=== Egypt Cup ===
3 January 2025 Round of 32	Tala'ea El Gaish	2–2 (a.e.t.) (4–3 p)	Olympic	Cairo
17:30 UTC+2	Fathy 27'; Omran 87' (pen.)		El Malek 90+1'; Ishaq 90+8'	Stadium: Gehaz El Reyada Stadium; Referee: Sayed Shaaban

17 January 2025 Round of 16	Ceramica Cleopatra	2–0	Tala'ea El Gaish	Cairo
15:00 UTC+2	Zalaka 47'; Lakay 62'			Stadium: Osman Ahmed Osman Stadium; Referee: Wael Farhan

=== Egyptian League Cup ===
==== Group stage ====
Pos	Team	Pld	W	D	L	GF	GA	GD	Pts	Qualification
1	Tala'ea El Gaish	3	2	1	0	5	2	+3	7	Advance to knockout stage
2	ENPPI	3	2	0	1	2	1	+1	6	Advance to knockout stage
3	Pharco	3	1	1	1	3	3	0	4	
4	Al Ahly	3	0	0	3	2	6	−4	0	

Source: EPL
Rules for classification: Group stage tiebreakers

12 December 2024 1	Pharco	1–1	Tala'ea El Gaish	Alexandria
17:00 UTC+2	Sherif 71'		Mohareb 29'	Stadium: Haras El Hodoud Stadium; Referee: Mohamed Abbas Kabil

22 March 2025 2	Tala'ea El Gaish	3–1	Al Ahly	Cairo
	Okwara 4', pen.'; Mohareb 38'; Wahid 61'		El Mahdi 55'	Stadium: Cairo Military Academy Stadium

17 April 2025 3	Tala'ea El Gaish	1–0	ENPPI	Cairo
				Stadium: Gehaz El Reyada Stadium

==== Knockout stage ====
===== Quarterfinals =====
23 April 2025 First leg	Ismaily	0–0	Tala'ea El Gaish
17:00

20 May 2025 Second leg	Tala'ea El Gaish	v	Ismaily
17:00
