= Mohamed Khalifa =

Mohamed Khalifa may refer to:

- Mohamed Abdel Aziz Khalifa (born 1925), Egyptian swimmer
- Mohamed Asswai Khalifa (born 1944), Libyan hurdler
- Mohamed Khalifa (footballer) (born 1986), Egyptian footballer
- Mohamed Khalifa (shot putter) (born 1996), Egyptian shot putter
- Mohamed Ould Khalifa (born 1968), Mauritanian long-distance runner
- Mohammed Jamal Khalifa (1957–2007), Saudi businessman
- Mohammed Khalifa, Canadian ISIS member
