= 2006 Egyptian Super Cup =

2006–07 Egyptian Super Cup
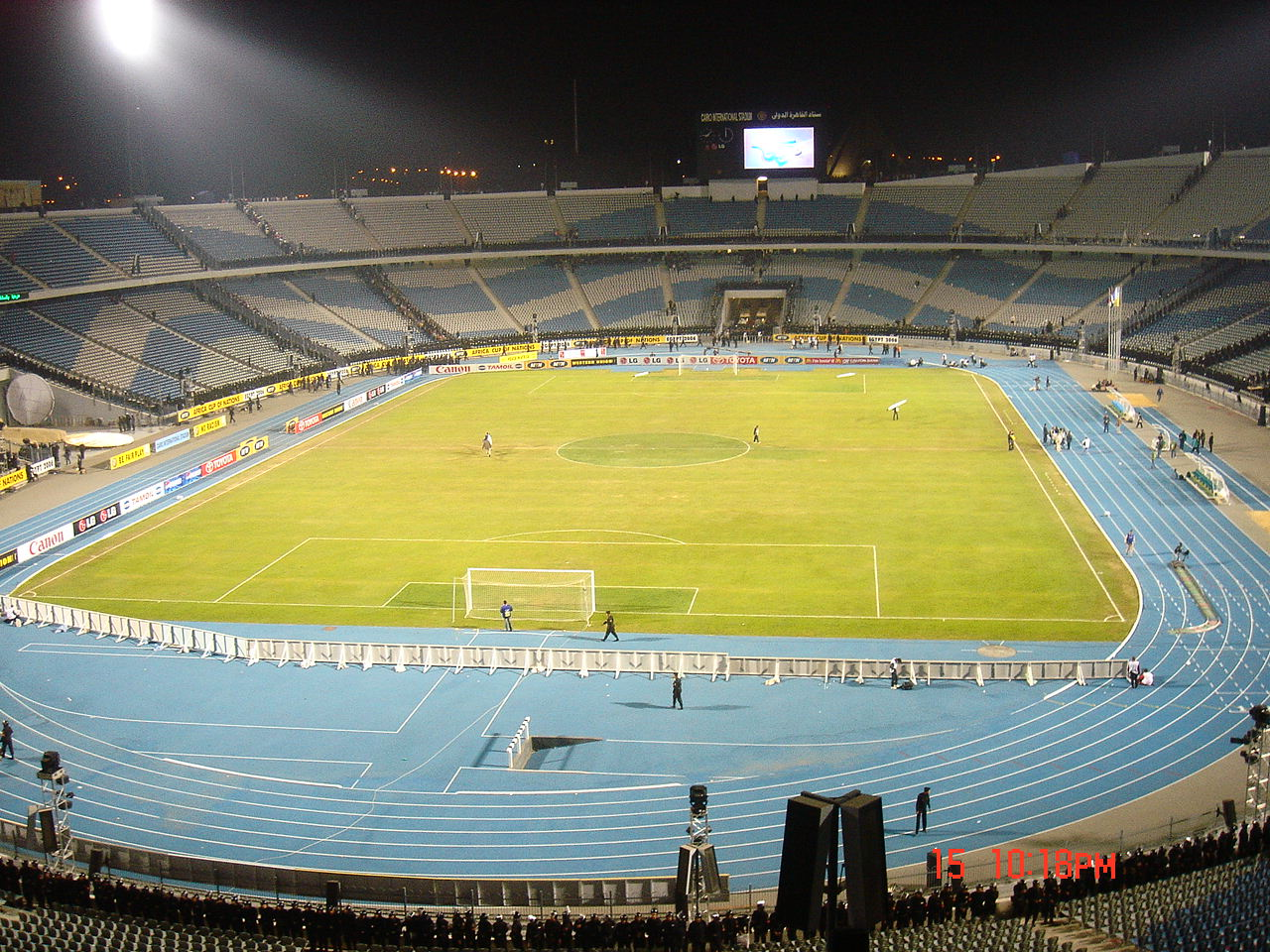
- Cairo Stadium hosted the match
Al Ahly	ENPPI
1	0
- Date: 23 July 2006
- Venue: Cairo International Stadium, Cairo
- Referee: Abdel Fatah (Egypt)

The 2006–07 Egyptian Super Cup was the sixth edition of the Egyptian Super Cup, an annual football match between the winners of the previous season's Egyptian Premier League and Egypt Cup. The match is usually contested by the winners of the Premier League and the Egypt Cup, but since Al Ahly won the double (2005–06 Egyptian Premier League and 2005–06 Egypt Cup), ENPPI qualified instead of Zamalek (second-placed in the league and cup), who was prevented from playing the match by decision of the football association. The match was played at the Cairo International Stadium. Al Ahly defended the trophy they won in the previous edition and defeated ENPPI 1–0.

== Details ==
23 July 2006

Al Ahly	1–0	ENPPI
Mohamed Aboutrika 90+1'

Cairo International Stadium, Cairo
Referee: Abdel Fatah (Egypt)

GK	1	(Egypt) Essam El Hadary
CB	26	(Egypt) Wael Gomaa
CB	7	(Egypt) Shady Mohamed
CB	5	(Egypt) Ahmad El-Sayed	(substituted off) 88'
LWB	11	(Egypt) Tarek El-Said	(substituted off) 46'
CM	25	(Egypt) Hossam Ashour	(substituted off) 50'
CM	20	(Egypt) Mohamed Shawky
RWB	2	(Egypt) Islam El-Shater
AM	22	(Egypt) Mohamed Aboutrika
FW	9	(Egypt) Emad Moteab
FW	18	(Egypt) Osama Hosny
Substitutes:
LB	29	(Egypt) Ahmed Shedid Qenawi	(substituted on) 46'
DM	14	(Egypt) Hassan Mostafa	(substituted on) 50'
CB	30	(Egypt) Mohamed Sedik	(substituted on) 88'
Manager:
(Portugal) Manuel José

GK	16	(Egypt) Mostafa Kamal
CB	13	(Mozambique) Mano	Yellow card
CB		(Egypt) Amr Fahim	Yellow card
CB		(Egypt) Reda Gomaa
RWB		(Egypt) Reda Shehata
CM		(Egypt) Ibrahim El-Shayeb
CM		(Egypt) Samir Sabry
CM		(Egypt) Mohamed Thabet
LWB		(Egypt) Abdallah Ragab		(substituted off) 60'
FW		(Egypt) Ahmed Abd El-Zaher		(substituted off) 55'
FW	17	(Egypt) Magdy Abd El Aatey
Substitutes:
FW		(Egypt) Reda Metwalli		(substituted on) 55'
LB		(Egypt) Fouad Salama		(substituted on) 60'
Manager:
(Germany) Rainer Zobel

Match rules

- 90 minutes.
- 30 minutes of extra time if necessary.
- Penalty shoot-out if scores still level.
- Seven named substitutes, of which up to three may be used.
