= Mohamed Adel =

Mohamed Adel (Arabic: محمد عادل) may refer to:

- Mohamed Adel (referee) (born 1978), Egyptian football referee
- Mohamed Emam (Mohamed Adel Mohamed Emam, born 1984), Egyptian actor
- Mohamed Adel (footballer, born 1992), Egyptian footballer
- Mohamed Adel (footballer, born 1996), Bahraini footballer
- Mohamed Adel Gomaa (born 1993), Egyptian footballer
- Mohammed Adel, Egyptian political activist
