= Rekabi =

Rekabi or Al-Rekabi (Persian: رکابی and الرکابی) is a Persian-language surname. Notable people with the surname include:

- Ali Al-Rekabi (1986), Canadian amateur wrestler
- Elnaz Rekabi (1989), Iranian sport climber
- Hadi Rekabi (1985), Iranian footballer
- Walid Hassan Abdallah Ibrahim Al Rekabi (1991), Sudanese footballer
