= Bisan (disambiguation) =

Bisan is a female nature spirit or deity widely venerated among the Malay and Jakun natives.

Bisan may also refer to:

- Bisan (name)
- Minami Bisan-Seto Bridge
- Bisan Center for Research and Development
- Honshi–Bisan Line
- Bisan Owda

== Places ==
- Beit She'an, the Israeli village mentioned in the prophecy regarding Al-Masih ad-Dajjal
- Bisan-dong, Anyang
- Bisan City tourist village
