= 2012–13 Egyptian Premier League =

Egyptian Premier League
- Season: 2012–13
- Matches: 136
- Goals: 293 (2.15 per match)
- Top goalscorer: William Jebor (Tala'ea El Gaish) (10 Goals)
- Biggest home win: Enppi 4–0 Haras El Hodood; Smouha 5–1 Ghazl El-Mahalla
- Biggest away win: Al Ittihad Al Sakandary 0–4 Petrojet; Tala'ea El Gaish 0–4 Ismaily; Enppi 1–5 Al Ahly
- Highest scoring: Al Mokawloon Al Arab 4–3 Tala'ea El Gaish
- Longest winning run: Zamalek, Al Ahly (10 matches)
- Longest unbeaten run: Zamalek, Al Ahly (10 matches)
- Longest winless run: Al Ittihad Al Sakandary (10 matches)

The 2012–13 Egyptian Premier League was the fifty-sixth season of the Egyptian Premier League since its establishment in 1948.

Following the 2013 Egyptian coup d'état on 3 July 2013, the season was suspended for security reasons, and a decision was reached to cancel the remainder of the season. Thus, the championship play-off and the relegation play-off were not played.

== Clubs ==
A total of 64 clubs have played in the Egyptian Premier League from its inception in 1948–49 up to and including the 2012–13 season. But only two clubs have been members of the Egyptian Premier League for every season since its inception. They are Al Ahly and Zamalek. Most of this season's matches and the 2011–12 season have been postponed, because of the Egyptian revolution.

The following 18 clubs are competing in the Egyptian Premier League during the 2012–13 season.

== League table ==
=== Group 1 ===
Pos	Team	Pld	W	D	L	GF	GA	GD	Pts	Qualification
1	Al Ahly (Q)	15	13	0	2	27	10	+17	39	Qualification for Championship Playoff
2	Enppi (Q)	15	8	5	2	24	15	+9	29	Qualification for Championship Playoff
3	Smouha	16	7	6	3	19	9	+10	27	
4	Telephonat Bani Sweif	15	5	6	4	10	10	0	21	
5	Haras El Hodood	15	4	5	6	14	16	−2	17	
6	El Gouna	15	3	5	7	12	19	−7	14	
7	Wadi Degla	15	4	2	9	12	20	−8	14	Relegation Playoff
8	Misr El Makasa	15	2	6	7	9	17	−8	12	Relegation Playoff
9	Ghazl El Mahalla	15	2	5	8	14	25	−11	11	Relegation Playoff

Source: RSSSF
Rules for classification: 1) points; 2) goal difference; 3) number of goals scored.
(Q) Qualified for the phase indicated

=== Group 2 ===
Pos	Team	Pld	W	D	L	GF	GA	GD	Pts	Qualification
1	Zamalek (Q)	15	13	0	2	26	11	+15	39	Qualification for Championship Playoff
2	Ismaily (Q)	16	9	3	4	20	11	+9	30	Qualification for Championship Playoff
3	Ittihad El Shorta	15	6	4	5	21	15	+6	22	
4	Tala'ea El Gaish	15	5	5	5	19	21	−2	20	
5	Al Mokawloon Al Arab	15	5	4	6	21	20	+1	19	
6	El Dakhleya	15	5	4	6	10	11	−1	19	
7	Petrojet	15	4	5	6	16	21	−5	17	Relegation Playoff
8	Al Ittihad Al Sakandary (Q)	15	3	5	7	10	19	−9	14	Relegation Playoff
9	El Entag El Harby (Q)	15	0	6	9	9	23	−14	6	Relegation Playoff

Source: RSSSF
Rules for classification: 1) points; 2) goal difference; 3) number of goals scored.
(Q) Qualified for the phase indicated
