= Abdel Aziz Moussa =

Abdel Aziz Moussa may refer to:

- Abdel Bouckar (Abdel Aziz Boukar Moussa, born 1980), Angolan basketball center
- Abdel Aziz Moussa (footballer) (born 1989), Egyptian footballer
