= Amr Nabil =

Egyptian footballer (born 1987)

Personal information
- Full name: Amr Nabil
- Date of birth: August 15, 1987 (age 39)
- Place of birth: Egypt
- Position: Center back

Team information
- Current team: Biyala SC

Senior career*
| Years | Team | Apps | (Gls) |
| 2003–2004 | Al Ittihad | | |
| 2004–2009 | Smouha | | |
| 2012–2013 | BWADC | | |
| 2013–2015 | El Raja | 48 | (0) |
| 2015–2017 | Al Ittihad | 40 | (0) |
| 2017–2018 | Tanta | 11 | (0) |
| 2018 | El Raja | 3 | (0) |
| 2018–2019 | Ghazl El Mahalla | | |
| 2019– | Biyala SC | | |
- * Club domestic league appearances and goals as of 19:40, 13 October 2019 (UTC)

Amr Nabil (born 15 August 1987) is an Egyptian footballer (soccer) defender who plays for Biyala SC.
