= Mohamed Khalifa (footballer) =

Egyptian footballer (born 1986)

Personal information
- Full name: Mohamed Ali Mohamed Khalifa
- Date of birth: 16 November 1986 (age 39)
- Height: 1.84 m (6 ft 0 in)
- Position: Centre forward

Team information
- Current team: El Qanah

Senior career*
Years	Team	Apps	(Gls)
–2015	Al-Masry		
2012–2013	El Dakhleya	8	(1)
2015–2016	Ghazl El Mahalla	18	(1)
2016–2017	Aswan	23	(1)
2017–2018	El-Entag El-Harby	12	(1)
2018–2019	El Mareekh		
2019	Tanta		
2019–2020	El Qanah		
- * Club domestic league appearances and goals as of 12 October 2017

Mohamed Khalifa (Arabic: محمد خليفة; born November 16, 1986) is an Egyptian professional footballer who plays as a centre forward for the Egyptian club El Qanah.

== Career ==
In 2016, Khalifa signed a 1-year contract for Aswan in a free agent transfer from Ghazl El Mahalla, he left by the end of his contract to El-Entag El-Harby and signed a 3-year contract for them.

On 30 January 2019 it was announced, that Khalifa had joined Tanta.
