= Ahmed Shedid Qenawi =

Egyptian footballer (born 1986)

Ahmad Shedid
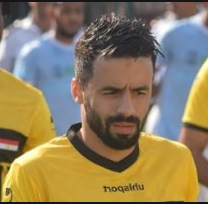
- Qinawy with El Entag El Harby in 2022

Personal information
- Full name: Ahmad Shedid Ahmed Mahmoud Ahmed Qinawi
- Date of birth: 1 January 1986 (age 40)
- Place of birth: Minya, Egypt
- Height: 1.66 m (5 ft 5 in)
- Position: Wingback

Team information
- Current team: Al Shams

Youth career
- –2001: El Minia
- 2001–2005: Al Ahly

Senior career*
| Years | Team | Apps | (Gls) |
| 2005–2008 | Al Ahly | 40 | (0) |
| 2008–2011 | Al Masry | 89 | (10) |
| 2011–2014 | Al Ahly | 32 | (2) |
| 2014–2016 | Tala'ea El Gaish | 58 | (4) |
| 2016–2017 | Aswan | 34 | (0) |
| 2017–2020 | El Entag El Harby | 98 | (3) |
| 2020–2022 | Al Masry | 39 | (1) |
| 2022–2024 | Haras El Hodoud | 30 | (0) |
| 2024–2025 | El Sekka El Hadid Modern | | |
| 2025 | La Viena | | |
| 2025– | Al Shams | | |

International career
| 2008–2013 | Egypt | 10 | (0) |
- * Club domestic league appearances and goals

Ahmad Shedid Ahmed Mahmoud Ahmed Qinawi (Arabic: أحمد شديد أحمد محمود أحمد قناوي) (born 1 January 1986) is an Egyptian footballer who plays in Al Shams. He is the son of the Egyptian player Shedid Qinawi, a former player for Al Masry.

== Career ==
He began playing for the first team on June 14, 2005. He achieved 7 National championships: the shield league and the Egyptian Super Cup once local and African Champions twice and the African Super once.

His debut in Al Ahly was in a preseason match against Portuguese club Belenenses with coach Manuel José. Ahmad scored a goal, helping Al Ahly achieve a 4–0 win.

Ahmad saw little first team action and he played with the under 20 team until he was fixed in the starting eleven in the 2006–2007 season after the injury of Gilberto and the death of Mohamed Abdelwahab.

On 19 June 2008, Al Masry signed with Al Ahly.

Qinawi returned to Al Ahly for an undisclosed fee in the 2011–2012 season. He made some first performances. This made him a regular starter under head coach Manuel José. He left the club on July 20, 2014.

Later on, he played for Tala'ea El Gaish, Aswan and El Entag El Harby. In October 2020, he rejoined Al Masry.

== Honours ==
Al Ahly

- Egyptian Premier League: 2005–06, 2006–07, 2008–09, 2013–14
- Egypt Cup: 2005–06, 2006–07
- Egyptian Super Cup: 2006–07
- CAF Champions League: 2006, 2012, 2013
- CAF Super Cup: 2007, 2013, 2014
