= Mahmoud El Badry =

Egyptian footballer (born 1991)

Mahmoud El-Badry
Personal information
- Full name: Mahmoud El-Badry Ali
- Date of birth: 1991 (age 34–35)
- Place of birth: Egypt
- Height: 1.80 m (5 ft 11 in)
- Position: Centre-back

Team information
- Current team: Smouha SC
- Number: 35

Youth career
- El Zamalek

Senior career*
Years	Team	Apps	(Gls)
2011–2013	El Zamalek	1	(0)
2012	→ Telephonat Bani Sweif (loan)		
2013–2015	El-Entag El-Harby	16	(2)
2015–2018	Tala'ea El-Gaish	14	(0)
2018–2020	El-Entag El-Harby		
2020-present	Smouha SC		
- * Club domestic league appearances and goals as of 16 October 2016

Mahmoud El Badry is a professional soccer player at Smouha Sporting Club in the Egyptian Premier League.

He has been playing as a professional player for more than 10 year now, He was the team Captain at El Entag El Harby SC also in the Egyptian Premier League.

Before he transferred to El Entag El Harby SC, he was player at Zamalek SC and Egyptian National Team U20.
