= Bisan (name) =

Bisan may be used as a surname or a given name.

== Given name ==
- Laureano Bisan-Etame Mayer (born 1977), Cameroonian footballer
- Bisan Owda, Palestinian filmmaker

== Surname ==
- George Bisan, Nigerian footballer
- Jaques Bisan (born 1993), Egyptian footballer
- Noor Bisan (born 1995), Israeli footballer
