= Osama Mohamed =

Egyptian footballer (born 1979)

Personal information
- Full name: Osama Mohamed Ahmed
- Date of birth: 1 October 1979 (age 47)
- Place of birth: Faiyum, Egypt
- Position: Left-back

Team information
- Current team: El Entag El Harby (assistant manager)

Youth career
- Petrojet

Senior career*
Years	Team	Apps	(Gls)
2006–2017	Petrojet	225	(8)
2017–2018	El Entag El Harby	3	(0)
Total		228	(8)

International career
2007–2009	Egypt	3	(0)

Managerial career
- 2018–: El Entag El Harby (assistant manager)
- * Club domestic league appearances and goals

Osama Mohamed (Arabic: أسامة محمد; born 1 October 1979), is a retired Egyptian footballer who played as a left-back. He is the assistant manager of Egyptian Premier League side El Entag El Harby.
