= Mohamed Ragab =

Egyptian footballer (born 1990)

Personal information
- Full name: Mohamed Ragab
- Date of birth: 19 June 1990 (age 36)
- Place of birth: Egypt
- Position: Forward

Team information
- Current team: El Entag El Harby
- Number: 9

Youth career
- Petrojet

Senior career*
Years	Team	Apps	(Gls)
2010–2018	Petrojet	111	(26)
2018–	El Entag El Harby	8	(5)
- * Club domestic league appearances and goals as of 17:57, 5 October 2018 (UTC)

Mohamed Ragab (Arabic: محمد رجب; born 19 June 1990), is an Egyptian footballer who plays for Egyptian Premier League side El Entag El Harby as a forward.
