= Amer Mohamed =

Egyptian footballer (born 1987)

Amer Mohamed Amer
Personal information
- Full name: Amer Mohamed Amer
- Date of birth: 14 February 1987 (age 39)
- Place of birth: elzaraby, Sohag, Egypt
- Height: 1.83 m (6 ft 0 in)
- Position: Goalkeeper

Team information
- Current team: Ghazl El Mahalla SC
- Number: 16

Youth career
- ENPPI

Senior career*
Years	Team	Apps	(Gls)
2007–2012	ENPPI	34	(0)
2012–2015	El Gouna	63	(0)
2015–2020	El Entag El Harby	116	(0)
2020–2023	Ceramica Cleopatra	66	(0)
2023-24	Al Mokawloon Al Arab SC	8	(0)
2024-	Ghazl El Mahalla SC	40	(0)

International career^{‡}
2018	Egypt	0	(0)
- * Club domestic league appearances and goals as of 17/3/26 @ 15:28(AEST) ‡ National team caps and goals as of 17:54, 16 November 2018 (UTC)

Amer Mohamed Amer (Arabic: عَامِر مُحَمَّد عَامِر; born 14 February 1987), is an Egyptian footballer who plays for Egyptian Premier League side Ghazl El Mahalla SC and the Egyptian national team as a goalkeeper.

== Career ==
In 2012, Amer moved to El Gouna from ENPPI and signed a 3-year contract. 3 seasons later, El Entag El Harby signed him from El Gouna for an undisclosed fee. In November 2020, he joined Ismaily.
