= Mohamed Moussa =

Egyptian footballer (born 1995)

Personal information
- Full name: Mohamed Moussa Soliman
- Date of birth: August 16, 1995 (age 31)
- Place of birth: North Sinai, Egypt
- Height: 1.85 m (6 ft 1 in)
- Position: Goalkeeper

Team information
- Current team: El-Entag El-Harby
- Number: 1

Youth career
- Wadi Degla: (( Al Ahly FC ))

Senior career*
Years	Team	Apps	(Gls)
–2016	(( Al Ahly FC ))		
2016–	Wadi Degla		
- El-Entag El-Harby

International career
- Egypt U23
- * Club domestic league appearances and goals as of 3 October 2017

Mohamed Moussa Soliman (Arabic: مُحَمَّد مُوسَى سُلَيْمَان; born August 16, 1995) is an Egyptian professional footballer who plays as a goalkeeper for El-Entag El-Harby. He was also a player for Egypt national under-23 team. In 2015, Moussa signed a 4-year contract for El-Entag, moving from Wadi Degla and Al Ahly Fc before it (2010–2011).
