= Abdel Aziz Moussa (footballer) =

Egyptian footballer (born 1989)

Personal information
- Full name: Abdel Aziz Moussa Ramadan Moussa
- Date of birth: 8 July 1989 (age 37)
- Position: Defensive midfielder

Team information
- Current team: Aswan SC
- Number: 8

Senior career*
Years	Team	Apps	(Gls)
–2011	Gasko		
2011–2014	El Dakhleya	34	(2)
2014–2015	ENPPI	6	(0)
2015	→Al-Masry (loan)	8	(0)
2015–2017	El Dakhleya	35	(2)
2017–2019	El-Entag El-Harby	31	(1)
2019–	Al Mokawloon	2	(0)
- * Club domestic league appearances and goals as of 20:46, 13 May 2019 (UTC)

Abdel Aziz Moussa Ramadan Moussa (Arabic: عَبْد الْعَزِيز مُوسَى رَمَضَان مُوسَى; born 8 July 1989) is an Egyptian professional footballer who plays as a defensive midfielder for Egyptian Premier League club Aswan SC. Mousa was loaned to Al-Masry from ENPPI for six months, he then moved to El Dakhleya in a free transfer with 2-year contract. In 2017, he signed a 2-year contract for El-Entag El-Harby.
