= Ahmed Yehia =

Egyptian footballer (born 1988)

Personal information
- Full name: Ahmed Yehia Abdelghani Mohamed
- Date of birth: August 15, 1988 (age 38)
- Place of birth: Egypt
- Position: Goalkeeper

Senior career*
Years	Team	Apps	(Gls)
–2018	Smouha SC		
2018–2021	El Entag El Harby SC	30	(0)
2021–2022	Al Ittihad Alexandria Club	9	(0)
2022	Modern Future FC	5	(0)
- * Club domestic league appearances and goals

Ahmed Yehia Abdelghani Mohamed (Arabic: احمد يحيى; born 15 August 1988) is an Egyptian footballer who played as a goalkeeper for Modern Future FC. He retired after an incident where fans of Modern Future FC booed him until he left the pitch.

== Career ==
Yehia played for Egyptian side Smouha SC. He was awarded Best Goalkeeper in the Abu Raida tournament while playing for the club. He played for them in the CAF Champions League. He also helped them achieve second place in the league and achieve second place in the 2014 Egypt Cup and 2018 Egypt Cup. In 2018, he signed for Egyptian side El Entag El Harby SC. On 2 April 2019, he debuted for the club during a 0–1 loss to ENPPI SC. He suffered relegation while playing for the club. In 2021, he signed for Egyptian side Al Ittihad Alexandria Club. On 14 February 2022, he debuted for the club during a 1–1 draw with El Sharkia SC. In 2022, he signed for Egyptian side Modern Future FC. On 6 June 2023, he debuted for the club during a 1–0 win over ENPPI SC.

== Personal life ==
Yehia had an older brother.
