= Karim Mansh =

Egyptian footballer (born 2004)

Karim MH
Personal information
- Full name: Karim Mohammed Hassan
- Date of birth: February 15, 2004 (age 22)
- Place of birth: Egypt
- Height: 1.81 m (5 ft 11 in)
- Position: Midfielder

Team information
- Current team: Ittihad
- Number: 69

Senior career*
Years	Team	Apps	(Gls)
2014–2015	Alassiouty	30	(4)
2015–	Ittihad	0	(0)
- * Club domestic league appearances and goals

Karim MH (Arabic: ;كريم المانش; born 15 February 2004) is an Egyptian football midfielder who plays for UAE Premier League side Ittihad Kalba.
