= Sayed El Shabrawi =

Egyptian footballer (born 1994)

Sayed Elshabrawi
Personal information
- Full name: Sayed Elshabrawi
- Date of birth: April 28, 1994 (age 32)
- Place of birth: Cairo, Egypt
- Height: 1.70 m (5 ft 7 in)
- Position: Right back

Team information
- Current team: Al Ittihad Alexandria

Youth career
- 2002–2014: Al-Ahly

Senior career*
Years	Team	Apps	(Gls)
2013–2014	Al-Ahly	3	(0)
2014–	Al Ittihad Alexandria	1	(0)
- * Club domestic league appearances and goals as of January 4, 2014

Sayed El Shabrawi (born April 28, 1994) is an Egyptian football (soccer) midfielder.

On 26 December 2013, Sayed made his debut with Al-Ahly in 2013–14 Egyptian Premier League match against El-Entag El-Harby. He came off the bench in the second half.
