= Anthony Lokosa =

Nigerian footballer (born 1997)

Personal information
- Full name: Anthony Abidemi Lokosa
- Date of birth: 5 May 1997 (age 29)
- Place of birth: Lagos, Nigeria
- Height: 1.85 m (6 ft 1 in)
- Position: Winger

Team information
- Current team: Tarxien Rainbows
- Number: 9

Youth career
- 2009–2013: Everlastingstars
- 2013–2015: Crown

Senior career*
Years	Team	Apps	(Gls)
2015–2017	36 Lion		
2016–2017	→ Beitar Tel Aviv Bat Yam (loan)	24	(5)
2017–2023	Pharco FC		
2019–2020	→ Haras El Hodoud (loan)	28	(4)
2021–2023	→ Almería B (loan)	50	(9)
2023–2025	Železničar Pančevo	15	(0)
2024	→ Smederevo (loan)	14	(2)
2025	→ Smederevo (loan)	16	(2)
2025	Smederevo	16	(3)
2026–	Tarxien Rainbows	16	(2)
- * Club domestic league appearances and goals as of 4 May 2026

Anthony Abidemi Lokosa (born 5 May 1997) is a Nigerian footballer who plays as a winger for Maltese Premier League club Tarxien Rainbows.

== Club career ==
Born in Lagos, Lokosa played for local sides Everlastingstars FC, Crown and 36 Lion FC before moving abroad in 2016, joining Israeli Premier League side Beitar Tel Aviv Bat Yam on a one-year loan deal. He made his professional debut on 19 August of that year, starting in a 1–1 away draw against Maccabi Sha'arayim.

Lokosa scored his first professional goal on 30 September 2016, netting the opener in a 2–1 home win over Maccabi Herzliya. After five goals in 24 appearances, he was bought by Pharco FC of the Egyptian Second Division in 2017.

In August 2019, Lokosa was loaned to Egyptian Premier League side Haras El Hodoud for the entire 2019–20 season. Upon returning to Pharco, he helped the side on their first-ever promotion to the top tier.

On 23 September 2021, Lokosa moved to Europe and joined UD Almería on loan, being assigned to the B-team in Tercera División RFEF.

== Personal life ==
Lokosa's older brother Junior is also a footballer. A forward, he represented Nigeria internationally once.
