= Mostafa El Gamal (footballer) =

Egyptian footballer (born 1997)

Personal information
- Date of birth: January 1, 1997 (age 29)
- Position: Central midfielder

Team information
- Current team: Petrojet SC
- Number: 14

Youth career
- –2017: Al-Ahly

Senior career*
Years	Team	Apps	(Gls)
2017–21	El-Entag El-Harby	52	(1)
2024–	Petrojet SC	74	(3)
- * Club domestic league appearances and goals as of 9 October 2017

Mostafa El Gamal (Arabic: مصطفى الجمل; born January 1, 1997) is an Egyptian professional footballer who plays as a central midfielder.

In 2017, El Gamal signed a 5-year contract for El-Entag in a free transfer from Al-Ahly.
