= Mostafa Kamal (footballer) =

Egyptian footballer (born 1973)

Personal information
- Full name: Mostafa Kamal El-Sayed
- Date of birth: October 23, 1973 (age 53)
- Place of birth: Egypt
- Height: 1.83 m (6 ft 0 in)
- Position: Goalkeeper

Senior career*
| Years | Team | Apps | (Gls) |
| 1993–2000 | Al Ahly | ?? | |
| 2000–2002 | El-Qanah | | |
| 2002–2003 | Goldi | | |
| 2003–2008 | ENPPI | | |
| 2008–2009 | Asyut Petroleum | | |
| 2009–2010 | El-Entag El-Harby | | |
| 2010–2015 | Misr Lel Makasa | | |
- * Club domestic league appearances and goals

Mostafa Kamal (born October 23, 1973) is a retired Egyptian football goalkeeper who has played for several teams in the Egyptian Premier League.

He was regularly called up for the national Egyptian football team in the past but never managed to get a senior cap.
