= Basem Eid =

Egyptian football defender (born 1990)

Personal information
- Full name: Basem Eid
- Date of birth: March 13, 1990 (age 36)
- Place of birth: Egypt
- Position: Defender

Team information
- Current team: Aswan

Senior career*
| Years | Team | Apps | (Gls) |
| 2013–2014 | El Sharkia | | |
| 2014–2016 | Ittihad Alexandria | 10 | (0) |
| 2016 | → Aswan (loan) | 15 | (0) |
| 2016– | Aswan | 4 | (1) |
- * Club domestic league appearances and goals as of 17 October 2016

Basem Eid (born March 13, 1990) is an Egyptian football (soccer) defender.
