= Abdel Rahman Farouk =

Egyptian professional footballer

Abdelrahman Farouk
Personal information
- Date of birth: June 9, 1984 (age 42)
- Position: Right back

Team information
- Current team: El-Entag El-Harby
- Number: 14

Senior career*
Years	Team	Apps	(Gls)
–2013	Haras El-Hodoud	66	(1)
2013–2014	Smouha	14	(0)
2014–2017	Al-Ittihad Alexandria	79	(1)
2017–	El-Entag El-Harby	4	(0)
- * Club domestic league appearances and goals as of 5 October 2017

Abdelrahman Farouk (Arabic: عبد الرحمن فاروق; born June 9, 1984) is an Egyptian professional footballer who plays as a right back for the Egyptian club El-Entag El-Harby. In July 2017, Farouk signed a 3-year contract for El-Entag, Al-Ittihad tried to sign the player again but El-Entag refused.
