= Ghanam Mohamed =

Egyptian footballer (born 1997)

Personal information
- Full name: Ghanam Mohamed Ghanam Abdalla
- Date of birth: 12 March 1997 (age 29)
- Place of birth: Egypt
- Height: 1.83 m (6 ft 0 in)
- Position: Defensive midfielder

Team information
- Current team: Modern Future
- Number: 27

Senior career*
Years	Team	Apps	(Gls)
2018–2021	El-Entag El-Harby	64	(4)
2021–	Modern Future	113	(3)
Total			(5)

International career
2019	Egypt U23	1	
2019	Confederation of African Football (Egypt)	1	
- * Club domestic league appearances and goals

Ghanam Mohamed Ghanam Abdalla (Arabic: غَنَّام مُحَمَّد; born 12 March 1997) is an Egyptian professional footballer who plays for Egyptian Premier League club Modern Future FC as a defensive midfielder.

== Biography ==
Ghanam Mohamed was born on March 12, 1997, in Egypt. He started his football career at Al Ahly. In 2017, he was transferred to El Gouna. In 2018, he was transferred to El Entag El- Harby and in 2021 he was transferred to Future FC. In general, he has over one hundred appearances across all competitions including his appearance at the 2019 Africa U-23 Cup of Nations.

== Trophies ==
He won the 2019 Africa U-23 Cup of Nations and the 2020/2021 EFA League Cup with the Future FC.
