= Ahmed El Sheikh (footballer, born 1990) =

Egyptian footballer

Personal information
- Date of birth: 12 June 1990 (age 36)
- Place of birth: Tanta, Egypt
- Position: Attacking midfielder

Team information
- Current team: Ghazl El Mahalla
- Number: 10

Youth career
- –2003: MS Shobr
- 2003–2005: Zamalek
- 2005–2007: Tanta

Senior career*
Years	Team	Apps	(Gls)
2007–2016	Tanta		
2016–2018	Al Ittihad	18	(3)
2017–2018	→ Tala'ea El Gaish (loan)	10	(0)
2018–2019	Haras El Hodoud	22	(2)
2019–2020	Masr	24	(3)
2020–	Ghazl El Mahalla	61	(13)
- * Club domestic league appearances and goals as of 14 December 2022

Ahmed El Sheikh (Arabic: أحمد الشيخ, born 12 June 1990) is an Egyptian footballer who plays for Ghazl El Mahalla SC as an attacking midfielder.
