= Sayed Shabrawy =

Egyptian footballer (born 1993)

Personal information
- Date of birth: April 1, 1993 (age 33)
- Place of birth: Cairo, Egypt
- Position: Right back

Team information
- Current team: El-Entag El-Harby

Youth career
- –2013: Al-Ahly U-19
- 2013–2014: Al-Ahly U-23

Senior career*
Years	Team	Apps	(Gls)
2013–2014	Al-Ahly	3	(0)
2014–2015	Al-Ittihad Alexandria	4	(0)
2015–2017	Aswan	43	(1)
2017–	El-Entag El-Harby	0	(0)

International career^{‡}
- Egypt national U-17
	Egypt national U-20	6	(0)
	Egypt national U-23	1	(0)
- * Club domestic league appearances and goals as of 6 October 2017 ‡ National team caps and goals as of 6 October 2017

Sayed Shabrawy (Arabic: السَّيِّد الشَّبْرَاوِيّ; born April 1, 1993) is an Egyptian professional footballer who currently plays as a right back for the Egyptian club El-Entag El-Harby. He also represented Egypt at national level, through U-17, U-20, and U-23 levels.

Shabrawy started his career in Al Ahly in 2000, and was promoted to play for the first team in 2014. He then moved to Al Ittihad Alexandria and played for one season, until he moved again in the 2015–16 season on a free transfer, signing a two-year contract with Aswan, where he has played most of his professional matches to date. In 2017, he signed a three-year contract with El-Entag El-Harby.
