= Mahmoud Farag =

Egyptian footballer (born 1986)

Mahmoud Farg
Personal information
- Full name: Mahmoud Farg
- Date of birth: May 5, 1986 (age 40)
- Place of birth: Egypt
- Positions: Midfielder; attacking midfielder

Team information
- Current team: Tanta SC

Senior career*
Years	Team	Apps	(Gls)
2013–2015	El Raja Marsa Matruh	30	(5)
2015–	El Ittihad Alexandria	42	(1)
	Tanta sc	42	(1)
- * Club domestic league appearances and goals as of July 23, 2015

Mahmoud Farg Kabonga (born 5 May 1986) is an Egyptian footballer (soccer) midfielder or central midfielder or attacking midfielder.

In July 2015, moved to Ittihad Alexandria.
