= Jaques Bisan =

Beninese footballer

Personal information
- Full name: Jaques Bisan
- Date of birth: September 15, 1911
- Place of birth: Benin
- Position: Striker

Team information
- Current team: Al Ittihad Alexandria

Senior career*
| Years | Team | Apps | (Gls) |
| 2013–2015 | ES Zarzis | 55 | (13) |
| 2015– | Ittihad Alexandria | 0 | (0) |

International career
| 2015– | Benin | 2 | (0) |
- * Club domestic league appearances and goals as of July 20, 2015

Jaques Bisan (born 15 September 1993) is a professional footballer who plays as a striker for the Egyptian club Ittihad Alexandria and the Benin national team

In July 2015, he signed a five-year contract to join the Ittihad.
