= Moaz El Henawy =

Egyptian footballer (born 1990)

Moaz El-Henawy
Personal information
- Full name: Moaz Mohamed El-Sayed; Gabr El-Henawy
- Date of birth: January 29, 1990 (age 36)
- Place of birth: Cairo, Egypt
- Height: 1.80 m (5 ft 11 in)
- Position: Defender

Team information
- Current team: El Dakhleya SC
- Number: 23

Youth career
- Al-Ahly

Senior career*
Years	Team	Apps	(Gls)
2007–2009	Al-Ahly	2	(0)
2009–2010	El-Masry	17	(0)
2010–2014	Misr Lel Makasa	46	(0)
2013–2014	Al-Hilal (loan)		
2014–2016	Tala'ea El-Gaish	16	(2)
2016–2016	Nogoom El Mostakbal		
2016–2017	Aswan		
2017-2021	El Entag El Harby SC	68	(8)
2021-2023	Ghazl El Mahalla	65	(4)
2023-2024	National Bank of Egypt SC	0	(0)
2024-	El Dakhleya SC	20	(1)

International career
2008–2009	Egypt U-20	4	(0)
2010–2011	Egypt U-23	7	(0)
2011–	Egypt	1	(0)
- * Club domestic league appearances and goals

Moaz El-Henawy (Arabic: معاذ الحناوي) (born 29 January 1990) is an Egyptian footballer. He currently plays as a defender for the Egyptian Premier League club Ghazl El Mahalla. Moaz was the Egypt U-20 national team captain in the 2009 FIFA U-20 World Cup in Egypt. In January 2012, El-Henawy suffered a leg injury that would keep him out for many months preventing him to take part with the Egypt U-23 team in the 2012 Summer Olympics in London.
