= Mahmoud Al Sayed =

Egyptian footballer (born 1985)

Mahmoud Al-Sayed
Personal information
- Full name: Mahmoud Al-Sayed
- Date of birth: May 10, 1985 (age 41)
- Place of birth: Alexandria, Egypt
- Position: Goalkeeper

Team information
- Current team: Al Ittihad Alexandria
- Number: 23

Senior career*
Years	Team	Apps	(Gls)
2013–	El Ittihad Alexandria	30	(0)
- * Club domestic league appearances and goals as of July 12, 2013

Mahmoud Al Sayed (born May 10, 1985, in Alexandria) is an Egyptian footballer (soccer) goalkeeper, who plays for Pharco FC.

In July 2015, Mahmoud made his debut with El Ittihad Alexandria in 2014–15 Egyptian Premier League match against Smouha SC.
