= Walid Hassan (footballer) =

Sudanese footballer (born 1991)

Personal information
- Full name: Walid Hassan Abdallah Ibrahim Al Rekabi
- Date of birth: 19 November 1991 (age 34)
- Place of birth: Tripoli, Libya
- Height: 1.75 m (5 ft 9 in)
- Position: Right-back

Team information
- Current team: Almahalla SC
- Number: 25

Senior career*
Years	Team	Apps	(Gls)
2008–2013	Almahalla SC		
2013–2017	Aschat SC		
2017–2018	Al Khums SC		
2018–2019	Ittihad Misurata		
2019–2021	Al-Merrikh SC		
2021–	Almahalla SC		

International career^{‡}
2020–	Sudan	7	(0)
- * Club domestic league appearances and goals as of 20:02, 5 September 2021 (UTC) ‡ National team caps and goals as of 20:02, 5 September 2021 (UTC)

Walid Hassan Abdallah Ibrahim Al Rekabi (Arabic: وليد حسن عبدالله الركابي, born 19 November 1991) is a professional footballer who plays as a right-back for Almahalla SC. Born in Libya, he plays for the Sudan national team.

== Career ==
Hassan is a youth product of the Libyan club Almahalla SC, and began his career with them. He followed them with stints at Aschat SC, Al Khums SC and Ittihad Misurata. In 2019, after the Libyan Premier League got stopped, he moved to the Sudanese club Al-Merrikh SC. He returned to this first club Almahalla on 24 May 2021.

== International career ==
Born in Libya, Hassan is of Sudanese descent. Hassan made his debut with the Sudan national team in a friendly 1–0 win over Eritrea on 25 January 2020.
