= Mohamed Adel (footballer, born 1992) =

Egyptian footballer

Personal information
- Full name: Mohamed Adel Abdel Fadil
- Date of birth: 11 September 1992 (age 34)
- Place of birth: Alexandria, Egypt
- Position: Defensive midfielder

Team information
- Current team: Al Ittihad
- Number: 8

Youth career
- Al Ittihad

Senior career*
Years	Team	Apps	(Gls)
2011–	Al Ittihad	115	(3)
- * Club domestic league appearances and goals as of 18:55, 8 November 2018 (UTC)

Mohamed Adel (Arabic: محمد عادل; born 11 September 1992), is an Egyptian footballer who plays for Egyptian Premier League club Al Ittihad as a defensive midfielder.
