= Himid Mao =

Tanzanian footballer (born 1992)

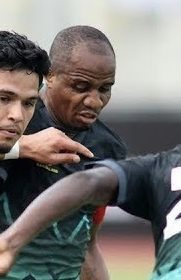
- Mao (center) in 2024

Personal information
- Full name: Himid Mao Mkami
- Date of birth: 5 November 1992 (age 34)
- Place of birth: Dar es Salaam, Tanzania
- Height: 1.77 m (5 ft 10 in)
- Position: Midfielder

Team information
- Current team: [Azam FC, Tanzania]
- Number: 23

Youth career
- 2005–2007: Elite Academy
- 2007–2009: Azam

Senior career*
Years	Team	Apps	(Gls)
2008–2018	Azam		
2018–2019	Petrojet	30	(1)
2019–2021	ENPPI	44	(1)
2021–22	Ghazl El Mahalla	61	(2)
2022-	Tala'ea El-Gaish SC	107	(0)

International career^{‡}
2009–2010	Tanzania U17		
2013–	Tanzania	81	(2)
- * Club domestic league appearances and goals as of 00:18, 30 April 2023 (UTC) ‡ National team caps and goals as of 9 September 2025 (UTC)

Himid Mao Mkami (born 5 November 1992) is a Tanzanian professional footballer who plays as a midfielder for Egyptian Premier League club Ghazl El Mahalla and the Tanzania national team.

== Early life ==
Mao was born in Dar es Salaam, Tanzania. His father, Mao Mkami, was also a footballer who represented Tanzania between 1991 and 1995 and was popularly known as "Ball Dancer". His primary education started at Kiwandani Primary School, Turiani, Morogoro, after which he moved to Dar es Salaam Karume and studied there until the sixth grade. He completed his primary education at Omar Ali Juma Primary School, Magomeni, Dar es Salaam and later joined Tabata Secondary School where he completed his Form 4 in 2011.

== Club career ==
Mao started with Elite Academy in 2005, and after getting a Tanzania under17 call up, he moved to Azam Academy in 2007, where he won the Uhai Cup twice in a row. In 2008, he played his first professional match against Kagera Sugar and was promoted to the senior side by 2009. During the 2013–14 season, he scored a decisive goal against Ruvu Shooting and helped Azam win the Tanzanian Premier League for the first time in their history.

After 11 years at Azam, he joined Egyptian Premier League side Petrojet in June 2018. In his first season with the club, he played in 30 out of 34 league matches. Following Petrojet's relegation, Mao signed a two-year contract with ENPPI on 1 August 2019.

== International career ==
Mao was called up to the Tanzanian under-17 squad for the 2010 Under-17 Copa Coca-Cola in South Africa. Tanzania scored 32 goals in the group stage, conceding only three, and qualified for the knockout round. They were eventually knocked out in the quarter-finals when they were defeated 1–0 by Botswana. Mao also played for Tanzania's under-20s and under-23s.

On 15 July 2017, he scored his first-ever international goal in a 1–1 draw against Rwanda in 2018 African Nations Championship qualification.

On 13 June 2019, Mao was named in Tanzania's 23-men squad for the 2019 Africa Cup of Nations in Egypt.

== Career statistics ==
=== Club ===
As of 29 April 2023

Club	Season	League			Cup		Continental		Other		Total	
Club	Season	Division	Apps	Goals	Apps	Goals	Apps	Goals	Apps	Goals	Apps	Goals
Petrojet	2018–19	Egyptian Premier League	30	1	0	0	0	0	0	0	30	1
ENPPI	2019–20	Egyptian Premier League	22	0	0	0	0	0	0	0	22	0
ENPPI	2020–21	Egyptian Premier League	22	1	0	0	0	0	0	0	22	1
ENPPI	Total		44	1	0	0	0	0	0	0	44	1
Ghazl El-Mahalla	2021–22	Egyptian Premier League	31	2	2	0	0	0	0	0	33	2
Ghazl El-Mahalla	2022–23	Egyptian Premier League	20	0	0	0	0	0	0	0	20	0
Ghazl El-Mahalla	Total		51	2	2	0	0	0	0	0	53	2
Career total			125	4	2	0	0	0	0	0	127	4

=== International ===
As of matches played 24 March 2023

National team	Year	Apps	Goals
Tanzania	2013	5	0
Tanzania	2014	5	0
Tanzania	2015	10	0
Tanzania	2016	5	0
Tanzania	2017	17	2
Tanzania	2018	6	0
Tanzania	2019	2	0
Tanzania	2020	1	0
Tanzania	2021	2	0
Tanzania	2022	4	0
Total		57	2

=== International goals ===
Scores and results list Tanzania's goal tally first.

No	Date	Venue	Opponent	Score	Result	Competition
1.	15 July 2017	CCM Kirumba Stadium, Mwanza, Tanzania	Rwanda	1–1	1–1	2018 CHAN qualification
2.	7 December 2017	Kenyatta Stadium, Machakos, Kenya	Zanzibar	1–0	1–2	2017 CECAFA Cup

== Honours ==
=== Club ===
Azam

- Tanzanian Premier League (1): 2013–14
