= Ahmed Fouad =

Ahmed Fouad may refer to:

- Ahmed Fouad Alkhatib (b. 1990), a Palestinian-American humanitarian activist and blogger/founder of Realign For Palestine
- Ahmed Fouad Aly (b. 1961), an Egyptian weightlifter
- Fuad II of Egypt (full name: Ahmed Fuad bin Farouk, b. 1952), King of Egypt and the Sudan from 1952 to 1953
- Ahmed Fouad Negm (1929 – 2013), an Egyptian vernacular poet
- Ahmed Fouad Nessim (1924 – 2013), an Egyptian water polo athlete
- Ahmed Fouad Shennib (1923 – 2007), a Libyan poet and politician
