= Mahmoud Hamada =

Egyptian footballer (born 1994)

Mahmoud Hamada محمود حمادة
Personal information
- Full name: Mahmoud Hamada Awad
- Date of birth: 1 June 1994 (age 32)
- Place of birth: Alexandria, Egypt
- Height: 1.77 m (5 ft 10 in)
- Position: Midfielder

Team information
- Current team: Al Masry
- Number: 14

Senior career*
Years	Team	Apps	(Gls)
2014–2016	Olympic Club		
2016–2019	Makkasa	9	(1)
2017–2019	→Entag El Harby (loan)	38	(1)
2019–2021	Pyramids	45	(1)
2021–2023	Pharco	64	(4)
2023–	Al Masry	47	(2)

International career
2022–	Egypt	10	(0)
- * Club domestic league appearances and goals

Mahmoud Hamada Awad (Arabic: محمود حمادة; born 1 June 1994), is an Egyptian professional footballer who plays as a midfielder for Al Masry and the Egypt national team.

== Career ==
Hamada began his senior career with Olympic Club in the Egyptian Second Division in 2014. On 19 May 2016, he moved to Makkasa where he played in the Egyptian Premier League for the first time. On 31 December 2017, he went to Entag El Harby on loan for 1.5 seasons. On 28 July 2019, he transferred to Pyramids where he stayed for 2 seasons. He then moved to Pharco on 8 September 2021 in their first ever season in the Egyptian Premier League. On 13 September 2023, he transferred to Al Masry on a 3-year contract.

== International ==
Hamada debuted for the Egypt national team in a friendly 3–0 win over Niger on 23 September 2022. He was called up to the national team for the 2023 Africa Cup of Nations.

== Personal life ==
Hamada was married on 4 July 2019, and his wedding was attended by his staff and colleagues from Entag El Harby.
