= Ghazl El Mahalla SC =

Association football club in El Mahalla El Kubra, Egypt

Ghazl El Mahalla
- Full name: Ghazl El Mahalla Sporting Club
- Nicknames: Za'eim El Delta (Boss of the Delta); Arjntin Misr (Egypt's Argentina)
- Short name: GMH
- Founded: 1 October 1936; 89 years ago
- Ground: Ghazl El Mahalla Stadium
- Capacity: 14,564
- Chairman: Walid Khalil
- Manager: Khaled Galal
- League: Egyptian Premier League

Ghazl El Mahalla Sporting Club (Arabic: نادي غزل المحلة الرياضي), commonly referred to as El Mahalla or simply Mahalla, is an Egyptian football club based in El Mahalla El Kubra. They compete in the Egyptian Premier League, the highest tier of the Egyptian football league system.

They are one of seven teams to have won the Egyptian Premier League, having won it once, in the 1972–73 season. The history of Ghazl El Mahalla has witnessed many achievements, most significantly during the era of the golden generation of the club which led the team to reach the finals of the African Cup of Champions Clubs (later known as CAF Champions League) in 1974, only beaten in the final by CARA Brazzaville from the Republic of the Congo. The team also reached the final of the Egypt Cup six times, but did not win any.

== History ==
Ghazl El Mahalla is one of the biggest clubs in the history of Egyptian football. It was founded in 1936 after the establishment of Misr Spinning and Weaving Company in El Mahalla El Kubra as an Egyptian national company under the leadership of the patriotic entrepreneur Talaat Harb. The English experts working at the company at that time used to play football with some of the Egyptian workers at the factory which led to the establishment of the club. In 1947, Ghazl El Mahalla Stadium was established and the company club began to participate in the Corporations League at that time. Later, Ghazl El Mahalla began to participate in the Egyptian Premier League in the 1956–57 season. Within years, the club rose through the ranks of Egyptian football and made a name for itself.

Due to its presence in a big city like El Mahalla El Kubra, the club began to have fans from the city and the towns surrounding it. So, even though the club was initially formed as a company club, it became one of the most supported clubs in Egypt and its fan base grew to become one of the biggest fan bases in Egyptian football. The team played in the Egyptian Premier League for 46 seasons and contributed a lot throughout its history to the Egypt national football team with talented players that came out of the club's youth system like Wael Gomaa, Mahmoud Fathalla, Ahmed Elmohamady, and Shawky Gharieb who is the current head coach of the Egypt national under-23 football team, as well as other talented players that rose to prominence during their time at the club like Mohamed Abdel Shafy who became one of the legends of fellow Egyptian club Zamalek SC, and Mohamed El-Atrawy who was in the 2001 squad of the Egypt national under-20 football team that achieved third place at the 2001 FIFA World Youth Championship.

The history of Ghazl El Mahalla testifies with a lot of achievements, the club won the Egyptian Premier League in the 1972–73 season under the command of the golden generation of the club, and among its legends are Mohammed Al-Siyagi, Abdul Rahim Khalil, Muhammad Amasha, Mahmoud Abdel Dayem, and Abdul Sattar Ali. And, the club reached the final of the African Cup of Champions Clubs (Later known as CAF Champions League) in 1974 but suffered a shocking defeat at the hands of the Congolese club CARA Brazzaville. The club participated in the African Cup of Champions Clubs (Later known as CAF Champions League) the following season in 1975 but was eliminated in the semi-finals, this marked the only two participations of Ghazl El Mahalla in the most prestigious club competition in the African continent, the CAF Champions League. The only other participation of the club in an African competition was in the African Cup Winners' Cup in 2002 where it got eliminated in the quarter-finals. The club was runner-up in the 1975–76 season of the Egyptian Premier League. And, managed to reach the final of the Egypt Cup six times but fortune did not favor it in any of them and the club was never able to win the Cup. The club was also runner-up at the inaugural Egyptian Super Cup in 2001 participating as Egypt Cup runner-up after Egypt Cup champions Ismaily SC withdrew from the competition. The club participated in the 1995 Arab Cup Winners' Cup, which was held in Tunisia, where it achieved third place. The club also participated in the 2004–05 Arab Champions League but got eliminated from the group stage after ending up in the fourth spot in Group B of the competition, this marked the only two participations of Ghazl El Mahalla in Arab competitions.

Throughout its history, Ghazl El Mahalla has been relegated to the Egyptian Second Division six times. The first time was in the 1960–61 season when Ghazl El Mahalla was relegated instead of Ittihad Suez due to lack of fair play from Ghazl El Mahalla's side in a match against Tersana SC, but the club managed to get promoted to the top tier again the following season. The fall of the club began in the 1994–95 season when the club placed twelfth in the Egyptian Premier League, the worst placing the club ended up with in 23 years. Although, it could be argued that the fall of the club began in the season prior to that when the club placed ninth, the worst placing the club ended up with in 15 years. Nonetheless, the following season, 1995–96, the club got relegated for the second time in its history, but yet again managed to get promoted to the top tier again the following season. Only to get relegated for the third time the following season, 1998–99, and to yet again manage to get promoted to the top tier again the following season. After that third promotion to the Egyptian Premier League, the performance of the club began to fluctuate over the course of the following nine seasons beginning in the 2000–01 season and placing anywhere between fourth and twelfth positions. This eventually resulted in the fourth relegation of the club to the Egyptian Second Division in the 2009–10 season, it took the club three seasons to get promoted back to the Egyptian Premier League in the 2012–13 season, only for it to get relegated for the fifth time and spend one more season in the Egyptian Second Division before getting promoted once again the following season. The club played its last season of 2015–16 in the Egyptian Premier League before being relegated to the Egyptian Second Division that season for the sixth time in its history, and to spend its longest consecutive seasons in the second level of Egyptian football having spent four seasons in the Egyptian Second Division before earning a promotion. On 13 October 2020, Ghazl El Mahalla, under the leadership of head coach Khaled Eid, earned a promotion to the Egyptian Premier League after defeating Olympic Club of Alexandria 2–1, the Alexandrian team scored first only for Mohamed Sami to score the equalizer within minutes and then Mahmoud Salah scored the winning goal for Ghazl El Mahalla, in an away match in the final matchday of the 2019–20 Egyptian Second Division to top their group (Group C) with 47 points, two points clear of the second-placed team, and officially announce their promotion to the Egyptian Premier League after four harsh years in the Egyptian Second Division. That night, thousands of Ghazl El Mahalla supporters filled the streets of El Mahalla El Kubra in celebration of the promotion of the club and gathered at the entrance to the city awaiting the arrival of the team from Alexandria, at the arrival of the team's bus the players stood above the bus and celebrated with the supporters as a huge parade took place which was decorated by the sounds of drums and the chants of the supporters that expressed their overwhelming happiness, "Oh Mahallawi (El Mahalla supporter)", "Play oh Mahalla", "Say it again, Say it again, Ghazl El Mahalla is back again", "Say oh world, Say oh people, Ghazl El Mahalla is back in the Premier". The supporters gathered at Ghazl El Mahalla Stadium as well and the celebrations continued all night and up till the next morning.

== Honours ==
=== Domestic ===
- Egyptian Premier League:
  - Winners (1): 1972–73
  - Runners-up (1): 1975–76
- Egypt Cup:
  - Runners-up (6): 1975, 1979, 1986, 1993, 1995, 2001
- Egyptian Super Cup:
  - Runners-up (1): 2001

=== Continent ===
- African Cup of Champions Clubs/CAF Champions League:
  - Runners-up (1): 1974

== Performance in CAF competitions ==
- FR = First round
- SR = Second round
- QF = Quarter-final
- SF = Semi-final

Season	Competition	Round	Country	Club	Home	Away	Aggregate
1974	African Cup of Champions Clubs	SR	Sudan	Al Hilal	4–1	1–4	5–5 (4–2 p)
1974	African Cup of Champions Clubs	QF	Kenya	Abaluhya	3–0	1–1	4–1
1974	African Cup of Champions Clubs	SF	Tanzania	Simba	1–0	0–1	1–1 (3–0 p)
1974	African Cup of Champions Clubs	Final	Congo	CARA Brazzaville	1–2	2–4	3–6
1975	African Cup of Champions Clubs	SR	Uganda	Express	1–0	1–1	2–1
1975	African Cup of Champions Clubs	QF	Sudan	Al Merrikh	2–1	0–0	2–1
1975	African Cup of Champions Clubs	SF	Nigeria	Enugu Rangers	3–1	0–3	3–4
2002	African Cup Winners' Cup	FR	Uganda	Express	2–1	1–2	3–3 (4–1 p)
2002	African Cup Winners' Cup	SR	Libya	Al Ahli Tripoli	2–0	1–2	3–2
2002	African Cup Winners' Cup	QF	Ghana	Asante Kotoko	4–2	0–3	4–5

== Performance in domestic competitions ==
Egyptian Clubs Competitions
Year	League	Position	Egypt Cup	Super Cup
2003–04	Egyptian Premier League	4	Round of 16	
2004–05	Egyptian Premier League	8	Quarter Final	
2005–06	Egyptian Premier League	11	Round of 32	
2006–07	Egyptian Premier League	6	Round of 32	
2007–08	Egyptian Premier League	8	Round of 32	
2008–09	Egyptian Premier League	12	Round of 16	
2009–10	Egyptian Premier League	14	Round of 32	
2010–11	Egyptian Second Division	1 (Group C)	Round 4	
2011–12	Egyptian Premier League	not finished	not held	
2012–13	Egyptian Premier League	not finished	Round of 16	
2013–14	Egyptian Premier League	10 (Group 1)	Round of 16	
2014–15	Egyptian Second Division	1 (Group C)	6 Preliminary Round	
2015–16	Egyptian Premier League	18	Round of 32	
2016–17	Egyptian Second Division	5 (group C)	Round of 16	
2017–18	Egyptian Second Division	7 (group C)	5 Preliminary Round	
2018–19	Egyptian Second Division	5 (group C)	Round of 32	
2019–20	Egyptian Second Division	1 (Group C)	1 Preliminary Round	
2020–21	Egyptian Premier League	14	Round of 32	

== Rivalries ==
=== El Mahalla Derby ===
The El Mahalla derby is a football match between Ghazl El Mahalla SC and Baladeyet El Mahalla SC, the two biggest clubs in El Mahalla El Kubra. The derby is always filled with a lot of excitement and thrill, often dubbed the "Fury Derby" due to the tense rivalry and animosity between the supporters of these two clubs. The two clubs have faced each other in both the Egyptian Premier League and the Egyptian Second Division, where Baladeyet El Mahalla currently plays, depending on which league the two clubs played in during that season, they have also met each other twice in the Egypt Cup. Even though, the performance of both clubs has deteriorated over the course of the past few decades, the derby still retains its value and prestige.

== Players ==
=== Current squad ===
Note: Flags indicate national team as defined under FIFA eligibility rules; some limited exceptions apply. Players may hold more than one non-FIFA nationality.

No.	Pos.	Nation	Player
1	GK	EGY	Ahmed El Nafarawy
2	DF	EGY	Bassam Walid
3	MF	EGY	Youssef Hassan
4	DF	EGY	Ahmed Castelo
5	DF	EGY	Amr El Gazar
6	DF	EGY	Ahmed Hakam
7	DF	EGY	Mohamed Gaber
8	MF	EGY	Mohamed Osama
9	FW	EGY	Abdo Yehia
10	MF	EGY	Ahmed Magdy (captain)
11	FW	EGY	Mohamed Hamdy
12	DF	EGY	Yehia Zakaria
13	FW	EGY	Ibrahim Hassan
14	MF	EGY	Khaled El Akhmimi
15	MF	EGY	Mohamed Ashraf
16	GK	EGY	Amer Mohamed

No.	Pos.	Nation	Player
17	FW	EGY	Hazem Abosena
18	GK	EGY	Ahmed El Arabi
19	MF	EGY	Mohamed Essam
20	FW	TUN	Mohamed Ali Ben Hammouda
21	DF	EGY	Abdelrahman Body
22	MF	EGY	Abdelnaser Mohamed
24	DF	EGY	Abdelrahim Amoory
25	MF	EGY	Mohamed Ashraf
26	DF	GHA	Hamidu Fatawu
28	FW	EGY	Hossam Greisha
30	DF	EGY	Osama El Nagar
32	FW	EGY	Mahmoud Sotohi
33	MF	CIV	Mory Touré
35	DF	EGY	Abdo Semida
38	DF	CIV	Abdoul Aziz Coulibaly
43	DF	EGY	Mohamed Nabih

=== Notable players ===
- (Egypt) Saber Eid (1977–1993)
- (Egypt) Shawky Gharieb (1978–1993)
- (Egypt) Ahmed Elmohamady (2004–2006)
- (Egypt) Yasser Radwan (2005–2006)
- (Egypt) Mohamed Abdel Shafy (2006–2009)
- (Egypt) Emam Ashour (2018–2019)

== Managers ==
- (Egypt) Sherif El-Khashab (March 21, 2009–Aug 26, 2009)
- (Egypt) Mohamed Radwan (Aug 27, 2009–???)
- (Egypt) Salah El-Nahy (Aug 19, 2011–Oct 20, 2011)
- (Egypt) Ibrahim Youssef (Oct 25, 2011–April 26, 2013)
- (Egypt) Abdel-Latif El-Doumany (April 26, 2012 – June 12, 2013)
- (Egypt) Farouk Gaafar (Sept 9, 2013–Jan 19, 2014)
- (Egypt) Ashraf Kasem (Jan 30, 2014–June 15, 2014)
- (Egypt) Mohamed Fayz (Jan 30, 2015–???)
- (Egypt) Khaled Eid (Dec 16, 2018–present)

Mohamed Ouda
