= El Entag El Harby SC =

Association football club in Cairo, Egypt

El-Entag El-Harby
- Full name: El-Entag El-Harby Sporting Club
- Nickname: Military Machines
- Founded: 2004; 22 years ago
- Ground: Al Salam Stadium
- Capacity: 30,000
- Owner: Ministry of Military Production
Home colours	Away colours	Third colours

El-Entag El-Harby Sporting Club (Arabic: نادي الإنتاج الحربي الرياضي), sometimes referred to as Military Production, is an Egyptian sports club based in Cairo, Egypt. The club is mainly known for its football team, which currently plays in the Egyptian Premier League, the top tier in the Egyptian football league system. The club is owned by the Egyptian Ministry of Military Production.

Founded in 2004, the club managed to reach the Egyptian Premier League for the first time in their history in 2009 after they were promoted from the 2008–09 Egyptian Second Division by finishing first in their group.

== History ==
After a long race with Al Nasr and El Dakhleya in 2008–09, El Entag El Harby secured its first appearance ever in the Egyptian Premier League. The team needed their last match that season (2–2 tie with GASCO) to win promotion. In preparation for its premier league campaign, El Entag El Harby appointed Tarek Yehia as the new manager. Yehia quickly looked for the option of signing experienced Egyptian players that could lead the team to prevent relegation. He signed players such as Mohamed Aboul Ela (Zamalek former captain), Mostafa Kamal (Veteran Goal Keeper), Hassan Mousa, and others.

Tarek Yehia enjoyed great success with his team. Surprisingly, El-Entag El-Harby finished 7th in its first season at the Premier League level (2009–10). However, Yehia's era at the club lasted for only that season. He preferred to move to newly promoted Misr Lel Makasa. Osama Orabi replaced him.

== Players ==
=== Current squad ===
As of 11 March 2021

Note: Flags indicate national team as defined under FIFA eligibility rules; some limited exceptions apply. Players may hold more than one non-FIFA nationality.

No.	Pos.	Nation	Player
1	GK	EGY	Ahmed Yehia (captain)
2	DF	EGY	Mohamed Shawky Gharib
3	DF	EGY	Taha
4	DF	EGY	Mohamed Bazoka
5	DF	EGY	Moaz El Henawy
6	MF	SCO	Christopher McKay
7	MF	EGY	Ahmed Afifi
8	DF	EGY	Sayed Shabrawy
11	DF	EGY	Ali Fathi
12	DF	EGY	Mohamed Tarek
13	MF	TAN	Himid Mao Mkami
14	MF	EGY	Mostafa El Gamal
15	DF	EGY	Ahmed Ali
17	MF	EGY	Alaa Salama
18	MF	EGY	Mohamed Ramadan

No.	Pos.	Nation	Player
19	MF	EGY	Mostafa El Badry
20	MF	MTN	Mamadou Niass
21	MF	EGY	Mohamed Sosta
22	MF	EGY	Ibrahim Abdel Khalek
24	DF	EGY	Mohamed El Shebini
25	MF	CIV	Mohamed Sanogo Vieira
26	DF	EGY	Islam Gaber
27	MF	EGY	Mahmoud Adel
28	GK	EGY	Mohamed El Ghandour
29	MF	EGY	Hassan Yassin
31	MF	EGY	Mahmoud Ragab
32	FW	EGY	Abdelrahman Osama
33	FW	EGY	Fadel Sherif
34	FW	EGY	Abdelrahman Rizk
70	MF	EGY	Khaled Ramadan

=== Out on loan ===
Note: Flags indicate national team as defined under FIFA eligibility rules; some limited exceptions apply. Players may hold more than one non-FIFA nationality.

No.	Pos.	Nation	Player

== Managers ==
- (Egypt) Tarek Yehia (May 5, 2009 – June 6, 2010)
- (Egypt) Osama Oraby (July 1, 2010 – July 13, 2011)
- (Egypt) Mohamed Helmy (Jan 8, 2011 – June 25, 2012)
- (Egypt) Osama Oraby (July 3, 2012 – April 24, 2013)
- (Egypt) Ismail Youssef (April 24, 2013 – 2014)
- (Egypt) Mo'men Soliman (March 3, 2015 – July 22, 2015)
- (Egypt) Shawky Gharieb (2015 – 20 March 2017)
- (Egypt) Mokhtar Mokhtar (2017 – 2021)
- (Egypt) Ahmed Abdel Moneim (2021–present)
