= 2019–20 Egyptian Premier League =

Egyptian Premier League
- Season: 2019–20
- Dates: 21 September 2019 – 31 October 2020
- Champions: Al Ahly; 42nd title
- Relegated: Haras El Hodoud; FC Masr; Tanta
- Champions League: Al Ahly; Zamalek
- Confederation Cup: Pyramids; Al Mokawloon Al Arab
- Matches: 306
- Goals: 692 (2.26 per match)
- Top goalscorer: Abdallah El Said (17 goals)
- Best goalkeeper: Mohamed El Shenawy (25 clean sheets)
- Biggest home win: Al Mokawloon Al Arab 6–0 FC Masr (29 September 2020)
- Biggest away win: Aswan 1–5 Al Ahly (5 October 2019); El Gouna 0–4 Al Ahly (25 November 2019)
- Highest scoring: Zamalek 4–3 El Gouna (27 September 2020)
- Longest winning run: 16 games Al Ahly
- Longest unbeaten run: 20 games Al Ahly
- Longest winless run: 19 games Tanta
- Longest losing run: 6 games FC Masr
- All statistics correct as of 31 October 2020.

The 2019–20 Egyptian Premier League, also known as The WE League for sponsorship purposes, is the 61st season of the Egyptian Premier League, the top Egyptian professional league for association football clubs, since its establishment in 1948. The season began on 21 September 2019 and will conclude on 31 October 2020. Fixtures for the 2019–20 season were announced on 12 September 2019.

Defending champions Al Ahly won their 5th consecutive and 42nd overall Egyptian Premier League title on 18 September 2020, following Zamalek's 1–0 defeat against Aswan.

On 14 March 2020, a decision was made by the Egyptian Football Association to postpone all football activities in Egypt due to the spread of the COVID-19 pandemic in the country. The initial suspension, until 29 March, was then extended multiple times until at least mid-July. On 2 July 2020, the EFA announced that the league would recommence on 6 August, and confirmed that all clubs' players and staff will be tested for COVID-19 before resuming training.

== Overview ==
=== VAR introduction ===
In August 2019, Egyptian Football Association acting-president Amr El Ganainy revealed the intentions to implement the video assistant referee (VAR) technology in the Egyptian Premier League starting from the second half of the 2019–20 season; stating that this would be a huge step forward for Egyptian football. Three months later, the EFA started a four-month training programme headed by EFA head of referees committee Gamal El Ghandour and Egyptian international referee Gehad Grisha for Egyptian referees to prepare them for the VAR introduction.

In late January 2020, the EFA received final IFAB approval for VAR usage in the domestic competitions after fulfilling all the necessary requirements to introduce VAR technology into Egyptian football. By the end of the training programmes held by the EFA, El Ghandour announced that 52 new Egyptian referee have received a VAR license; describing it as a "miracle" to have from 4 to 56 licensed referee in just four months.

The VAR technology was officially introduced in the Egyptian Premier League on 5 March 2020 in a match between Tala'ea El Gaish and ENPPI at Gehaz El Reyada Stadium.

=== Effects of the COVID-19 pandemic ===
After the first case of COVID-19 was identified in Egypt on 14 February 2020, the Egyptian Football Association revealed that there is no intentions to postpone football activities in Egypt and instead they announced a series of precautionary measures to be used by all clubs' players and staff. By the arrival of the first COVID-19 case in Egypt, the league was paused for the mid-season break.

On 10 March 2020, the EFA decided to continue the league behind closed doors until further notice to avoid the spreading of the disease. However, after the number of infected people in Egypt reached 110 cases just four days later of the initial announcement, the EFA decided to suspend all football activities in Egypt until at least 29 March 2020.

==== Resumption ====
On 1 July 2020, Zamalek refused to resume training or return to complete the season due to the COVID-19 pandemic in the country unless a "cure" for coronavirus is found, this came after the club's goalkeeper Mohammed Awad revealed he had tested positive for COVID-19 on 26 June. Football activities were due to return on 25 July after the government allowed teams to resume training in June

Nevertheless, the EFA announced on 3 July 2020 that the season would commence on 6 August 2020 after almost five months of being suspended due to the COVID-19 pandemic, the season would commence its schedule in two phases starting with the postponed games according to the head of Competitions Committee Hossam El Zanati.

The first phase will include the games scheduled to be played from 6 August until the end of the month, while the second phase of the games are scheduled to be played starting from 1 September until the end of the season. These will be revealed when the EFA reaches a final agreement concerning the Aswan Stadium as the venue for matches after clubs rejected Aswan Stadium located south of Cairo, as the proposed location for matches to be played citing the distance and long journey for the players and after CAF decides the final dates for the Champions League and CAF Confederation Cup semi-finals and finals.

The EFA in June had implemented safety guidelines and testing procedures for players mandating two tests with five days separating each test, since then 19 tests have returned positive with individuals in isolation.

== Teams ==
Locations of the 2019–20 Egyptian Premier League teams

Eighteen teams will compete in the league - the top fifteen teams from the previous season, and three teams promoted from the Egyptian Second Division.

Teams promoted to the Egyptian Premier League
The first team to be promoted was Aswan from Group A, as they secured the promotion to the Egyptian Premier League following their 2–1 away win against Al Nasr Lel Taa'den on 4 April 2019. The club returned to the Egyptian Premier League after staying two seasons in the Egyptian Second Division, and will play in the top flight for the tenth time in their history.

The second team to be promoted was Tanta from Group C, as they sealed the promotion to the Egyptian Premier League following their 2–0 away win against Sidi Salem on 11 April 2019. The club returned to the Egyptian Premier League after spending only one season in the Egyptian Second Division, as they were relegated from the Egyptian Premier League during the 2017–18 season. This season will mark the fifteenth appearance for Tanta in the Egyptian Premier League.

The third team to be promoted was FC Masr from Group B, as they earned the promotion to the Egyptian Premier League following their 0–0 away draw with Al Merreikh on 18 April 2019. The club earned the promotion after an intense contents with 4 other clubs for the only promotion spot from their group. FC Masr will play in the Egyptian Premier League for the first time in the club's history.

Teams relegated to the Egyptian Second Division
The first club to be relegated was Nogoom, who suffered an immediate return to the Egyptian Second Division following a 2–1 away defeat to Misr Lel Makkasa on 10 May 2019. Despite defeating Zamalek 1–0 earlier in the previous season and having a great start, the club started slowly to collapse which eventually made them finish in the last place.

The second club to be relegated was El Dakhleya, who were relegated from the Egyptian Premier League for the first time in their history following a 2–1 home defeat to Zamalek on 12 May 2019; ending their stay in the league that lasted for eight years. El Dakhleya were one of eight clubs that are not founding members of the Egyptian Premier League and have never been relegated since their debut in the top flight.

The third club to be relegated was Suez-based side Petrojet, who were also relegated from the Egyptian Premier League for the first time in their history following a 0–0 draw with Al Mokawloon Al Arab on 3 June 2019; ending their top flight spell of thirteen years. Similar to El Dakhleya, Petrojet were one of eight clubs that are not founding members of the Egyptian Premier League and have never been relegated since their debut in the top flight.

=== Venues ===
| Al Ahly | Aswan | ENPPI |
|---|---|---|
| Cairo International Stadium | Aswan Stadium | Petro Sport Stadium |
| Capacity: **75,000** | Capacity: **20,000** | Capacity: **16,000** |
| El Entag El Harby | FC Masr | El Gouna |
| Al Salam Stadium | Cairo Military Academy Stadium | Khaled Bichara Stadium (Note: The stadium's official name was changed from El Gouna Stadium to Khaled Bichara Stadium on 15 February 2020.) |
| Capacity: **30,000** | Capacity: **28,500** | Capacity: **12,000** |
| Haras El Hodoud | Ismaily | Al Ittihad |
| Haras El Hodoud Stadium | Ismailia Stadium | Alexandria Stadium |
| Capacity: **22,000** | Capacity: **18,525** | Capacity: **19,676** |
| Al Masry | Misr Lel Makkasa | Al Mokawloon Al Arab |
| Egyptian Army Stadium (Note: Al Masry play their home matches at the Egyptian Army Stadium in Suez instead of their regular stadium Al Masry Club Stadium in Port Said due to renovations.) | Al Salam Stadium (Note: Misr Lel Makkasa play their home matches at Al Salam Stadium in Cairo instead of their regular stadium Faiyum Stadium in Faiyum due to unavailability.) | Osman Ahmed Osman Stadium |
| Capacity: **45,000** | Capacity: **30,000** | Capacity: **35,000** |
| Pyramids | Smouha | Tala'ea El Gaish |
| 30 June Stadium | Alexandria Stadium | Gehaz El Reyada Stadium |
| Capacity: **30,000** | Capacity: **19,676** | Capacity: **20,000** |
| Tanta | Wadi Degla | Zamalek |
| Tanta Club Stadium | Petro Sport Stadium | Cairo International Stadium |
| Capacity: **8,000** | Capacity: **16,000** | Capacity: **75,000** |

=== Personnel and kits ===
| Team | Manager | Captain | Kit manufacturer | Shirt sponsor |
|---|---|---|---|---|
| Al Ahly | (South Africa) Pitso Mosimane | (Egypt) Mohamed El Shenawy | Umbro | WE, SAIB Bank, Royal Dutch Shell^{1}, Tiger Chips^{1}, GLC Paints^{2} |
| Aswan | (Egypt) Ahmed Abdel Moneim | (Egypt) Haitham El Fil | Uhlsport | **N/A** |
| ENPPI | (Egypt) Helmy Toulan | (Egypt) Ramy Sabry | Nike | **N/A** |
| El Entag El Harby | (Egypt) Mokhtar Mokhtar | (Egypt) Mahmoud El Badry | Uhlsport | **N/A** |
| FC Masr | (Egypt) Tarek Abdallah | (Egypt) Mostafa Sultan | Macron | **N/A** |
| El Gouna | (Egypt) Reda Shehata (caretaker) | (Egypt) Mohamed Nagy | Adidas | O West, Orascom Development^{2} |
| Haras El Hodoud | (Egypt) Mohamed Halim | (Egypt) Mostafa Gamal | Uhlsport | **N/A** |
| Ismaily | (Brazil) Heron Ferreira | (Egypt) Baher El Mohamady | Jako | **N/A** |
| Al Ittihad | (Egypt) Hossam Hassan | (Egypt) Nour El Sayed | Xtep | **N/A** |
| Al Masry | (Egypt) Ali Maher | (Egypt) Islam Salah | Kelme | **N/A** |
| Misr Lel Makkasa | (Egypt) Jamal Omar (caretaker) | (Egypt) Mido Gaber | Nike | **N/A** |
| Al Mokawloon Al Arab | (Egypt) Emad El Nahhas | (Egypt) Mahmoud Abou El Saoud | Kelme | **N/A** |
| Pyramids | (Croatia) Ante Čačić | (Egypt) Abdallah El Said | Adidas | Swyp^{2} |
| Smouha | (Egypt) Ahmed Samy | (Egypt) Ahmed Homos | Nike | **N/A** |
| Tala'ea El Gaish | (Egypt) Abdel Hamid Bassiouny | (Egypt) Mohamed Bassam | Macron | **N/A** |
| Tanta | (Egypt) Reda Abdel Aal | (Egypt) Soliman Abd Rabo | Uhlsport | **N/A** |
| Wadi Degla | (Cyprus) Nikodimos Papavasiliou | (Egypt) Hossam Arafat | Joma | FACE for Children in Need, Caltex^{2} |
| Zamalek | (Portugal) Jaime Pacheco | (Egypt) Mahmoud Shikabala | Puma | **N/A** |

1. On the back of shirt.
2. On the sleeves.

- WE, Oppo, El Kasrawy Group, SAIB Bank, EgyptAir and GLC Paints are the league's main sponsors, and their logos are printed on most teams' kits.
- Referee kits are made by Puma.

=== Managerial changes ===
| Team | Outgoing manager | Manner of departure | Date of vacancy | Position in table | Incoming manager | Date of appointment |
|---|---|---|---|---|---|---|
| El Gouna | (Egypt) Reda Shehata | End of caretaker spell | 29 July 2019 | Pre-season | (Serbia) Nebojša Milošević | 29 July 2019 |
| Zamalek | (Egypt) Khaled Galal | Sacked | 29 July 2019 | Pre-season | (Egypt) Tarek Yehia (caretaker) | 2 August 2019 |
| FC Masr | (Egypt) Mohamed Salah | Resigned | 5 August 2019 | Pre-season | (Egypt) Osama Nabieh | 6 August 2019 |
| Zamalek | (Egypt) Tarek Yehia | End of caretaker spell | 18 August 2019 | Pre-season | (Serbia) Milutin Sredojević | 18 August 2019 |
| Al Ahly | (Uruguay) Martín Lasarte | Sacked | 18 August 2019 | Pre-season | (Egypt) Mohamed Youssef (caretaker) | 18 August 2019 |
| Al Ahly | (Egypt) Mohamed Youssef | End of caretaker spell | 31 August 2019 | Pre-season | (Switzerland) René Weiler | 31 August 2019 |
| Ismaily | (Egypt) Mahmoud Gaber | Resigned | 31 August 2019 | Pre-season | (Serbia) Miodrag Ješić | 31 August 2019 |
| FC Masr | (Egypt) Osama Nabieh | Resigned | 6 September 2019 | Pre-season | (Egypt) Abdel Nasser Mohamed | 7 September 2019 |
| ENPPI | (Egypt) Ali Maher | Resigned | 17 October 2019 | 18th | (Egypt) Helmy Toulan | 18 October 2019 |
| Tala'ea El Gaish | (Brazil) Sérgio Farias | Mutual consent | 13 November 2019 | 17th | (Egypt) Tarek Yehia | 13 November 2019 |
| Ismaily | (Serbia) Miodrag Ješić | Sacked | 2 December 2019 | 12th | (Egypt) Adham El Selehdar (caretaker) | 2 December 2019 |
| Zamalek | (Serbia) Milutin Sredojević | Sacked | 2 December 2019 | 5th | (France) Patrice Carteron | 3 December 2019 |
| El Gouna | (Serbia) Nebojša Milošević | Sacked | 10 December 2019 | 17th | (Egypt) Reda Shehata (caretaker) | 10 December 2019 |
| Pyramids | (France) Sébastien Desabre | Sacked | 19 December 2019 | 7th | (Egypt) Abdel Aziz Abdel Shafy (caretaker) | 19 December 2019 |
| El Gouna | (Egypt) Reda Shehata | End of caretaker spell | 22 December 2019 | 11th | (Portugal) Pedro Barny | 22 December 2019 |
| Pyramids | (Egypt) Abdel Aziz Abdel Shafy | End of caretaker spell | 27 December 2019 | 5th | (Croatia) Ante Čačić | 27 December 2019 |
| Ismaily | (Egypt) Adham El Selehdar | End of caretaker spell | 7 January 2020 | 11th | (France) Didier Gomes | 7 January 2020 |
| Smouha | (Egypt) Hossam Hassan | Resigned | 12 January 2020 | 7th | (Egypt) Hamada Sedki | 12 January 2020 |
| Tala'ea El Gaish | (Egypt) Tarek Yehia | Resigned | 20 January 2020 | 16th | (Egypt) Abdel Hamid Bassiouny | 21 January 2020 |
| Misr Lel Makkasa | (Egypt) Mido | Sacked | 22 January 2020 | 15th | (Nigeria) Emmanuel Amunike | 1 February 2020 |
| FC Masr | (Egypt) Abdel Nasser Mohamed | Resigned | 5 February 2020 | 18th | (Egypt) Khaled Galal | 9 February 2020 |
| Wadi Degla | (Greece) Takis Gonias | Mutual consent | 11 February 2020 | 17th | (Algeria) Mustapha Kharoubi (caretaker) | 11 February 2020 |
| Haras El Hodoud | (Egypt) Tarek El Ashry | Signed by Al Masry | 20 February 2020 | 12th | (Egypt) Mohamed Halim | 22 February 2020 |
| Al Masry | (Egypt) Ehab Galal | Sacked | 20 February 2020 | 10th | (Egypt) Tarek El Ashry | 20 February 2020 |
| Wadi Degla | (Algeria) Mustapha Kharoubi | End of caretaker spell | 21 February 2020 | 17th | (Cyprus) Nikodimos Papavasiliou | 21 February 2020 |
| Misr Lel Makkasa | (Nigeria) Emmanuel Amunike | Mutual consent | 1 March 2020 | 16th | (Egypt) Ehab Galal | 2 March 2020 |
| Aswan | (Egypt) Magdy Abdel Aati | Resigned | 9 June 2020 | 13th | (Egypt) Ahmed Abdel Moneim | 20 June 2020 |
| Tanta | (Egypt) Ayman El Mizzayn | Sacked | 12 August 2020 | 17th | (Egypt) Mohamed Salah | 12 August 2020 |
| Ismaily | (France) Didier Gomes | Sacked | 25 August 2020 | 9th | (Egypt) Adham El Selehdar (caretaker) | 25 June 2020 |
| Al Masry | (Egypt) Tarek El Ashry | Sacked | 31 August 2020 | 15th | (Egypt) Ali Maher | 1 September 2020 |
| Tanta | (Egypt) Mohamed Salah | Resigned | 31 August 2020 | 18th | (Egypt) Ahmed Samy | 31 August 2020 |
| Ismaily | (Egypt) Adham El Selehdar | Resigned | 4 September 2020 | 10th | (Egypt) Mohamed Homos (caretaker) | 4 September 2020 |
| Tanta | (Egypt) Ahmed Samy | Resigned | 6 September 2020 | 18th | (Egypt) Ayman El Mizzayn | 6 September 2020 |
| Smouha | (Egypt) Hamada Sedki | Mutual consent | 6 September 2020 | 6th | (Egypt) Ahmed Samy | 7 September 2020 |
| Ismaily | (Egypt) Mohamed Homos | End of caretaker spell | 10 September 2020 | 10th | (Brazil) Heron Ferreira | 10 September 2020 |
| El Gouna | (Portugal) Pedro Barny | Sacked | 14 September 2020 | 15th | (Egypt) Reda Shehata (caretaker) | 14 September 2020 |
| Haras El Hodoud | (Egypt) Mohamed Halim | Mutual consent | 15 September 2020 | 16th | (Egypt) Tarek El Ashry | 15 September 2020 |
| FC Masr | (Egypt) Khaled Galal | Resigned | 16 September 2020 | 17th | (Egypt) Tarek Abdallah | 18 September 2020 |
| Tanta | (Egypt) Ayman El Mizzayn | Resigned | 16 September 2020 | 18th | (Egypt) Reda Abdel Aal | 6 September 2020 |
| Zamalek | (France) Patrice Carteron | Resigned | 16 September 2020 | 2nd | (Egypt) Tarek Yehia (caretaker) | 16 September 2020 |
| Misr Lel Makkasa | (Egypt) Ehab Galal | Resigned | 22 September 2020 | 8th | (Egypt) Ali Ashour | 22 September 2020 |
| Zamalek | (Egypt) Tarek Yehia (caretaker) | End of caretaker spell | 30 September 2020 | 2nd | (Portugal) Jaime Pacheco | 30 September 2020 |
| Al Ahly | (Switzerland) René Weiler | Resigned | 1 October 2020 | 1st | (South Africa) Pitso Mosimane | 1 October 2020 |
| Haras El Hodoud | (Egypt) Tarek El Ashry | Resigned | 9 October 2020 | 16th | (Egypt) Mohamed Halim | 9 October 2020 |
| Misr Lel Makkasa | (Egypt) Ali Ashour | Resigned | 12 October 2020 | 7th | (Egypt) Jamal Omar (caretaker) | 12 October 2020 |
| Al Ittihad | (Egypt) Talaat Youssef | Resigned | 12 October 2020 | 8th | (Egypt) Hossam Hassan | 13 October 2020 |

=== Foreign players ===
Clubs can have a maximum of four foreign players registered during the season. Clubs cannot sign foreign players unless these players have played in the first or second tier in their countries. Clubs also cannot sign any foreign goalkeepers. In addition, each club can register a player from Palestine, Syria, or the UNAF region; those players are not counted as foreign players. Also, any foreign player who holds Egyptian nationality is not considered a foreign player and will be registered as a local player. For example, Al Masry's player Mahmoud Wadi of Palestine holds both Palestinian and Egyptian nationalities, and as a result he is not registered as a foreign player.

- Players name followed with ^{†} indicates the player is playing out on loan.
- Players name followed with ^{§} indicates the player is playing for the club on loan.
- Players name in **bold** indicates the player is registered during the mid-season transfer window.
- Players name in ITALICS indicates the player has left the club during the mid-season transfer window.

| Club | Player 1 | Player 2 | Player 3 | Player 4 | Player 5 | Under contract | Former players |
|---|---|---|---|---|---|---|---|
| Al Ahly | (Angola) Geraldo | (Mali) Aliou Dieng | (Nigeria) Junior Ajayi | (Senegal) **Aliou Badji** | (Tunisia) Ali Maâloul | (Morocco) Walid Azaro^{†} | |
| Aswan | (Ethiopia) Oumed Oukri | (Ghana) **Solomon Mensah** | (Guinea) Badara Naby Sylla | (Rwanda) **Jean-Claude Iranzi**^{§} | | | (Burkina Faso) Moussa Dao (Greece) Giorgos Lyras (Kenya) Alex Orotomal (Nigeria) Newman Musa (Senegal) Cheikh Bamba |
| ENPPI | (Burundi) Fiston Abdul Razak | (Liberia) **Tonia Tisdell** | (Tanzania) Himid Mao | | | (Mali) Aboubacar Diarra^{†} | (Democratic Republic of the Congo) Chadrack Lukombe (Haiti) Jonel Désiré (Ivory Coast) Wilfried Yessoh (Tanzania) Shiza Kichuya |
| El Entag El Harby | (Guinea) Moussa Diawara | (Ivory Coast) Mohamed Vieira | (Mauritania) Mamadou Niass | (Tunisia) Aymen Trabelsi^{§} | | (Ghana) Abdulwahab Annan^{†} | (Nigeria) James Owoboskini (Palestine) Hamed Hamdan |
| FC Masr | (Brazil) Ygor | (France) Willis Furtado | (The Gambia) **Jibril Bojang** | (Kenya) Cliff Nyakeya | (Palestine) Michel Termanini | | |
| El Gouna | (Cameroon) Jonathan Ngwem | (Ivory Coast) Serge Aka | (Uganda) Allan Kyambadde | (Zambia) Walter Bwalya | | | (Ethiopia) Gatoch Panom (Nigeria) Chisom Chikatara (Senegal) Ousseynou Boye |
| Haras El Hodoud | (Ghana) Nana Antwi | (Ivory Coast) Ibrahim Koné | (Nigeria) Anthony Lokosa | (Tunisia) **Ayoub Ben Mcharek**^{§} | | | (Cameroon) Cyrille Ndaney (Ethiopia) Gatoch Panom (Liberia) Amadaiya Rennie (Nigeria) Edu Moses |
| Ismaily | (Guinea-Bissau) Piqueti | (Iraq) Humam Tariq | (Namibia) Benson Shilongo | (Uganda) **Patrick Kaddu** | (Tunisia) **Fakhreddine Ben Youssef** | | (Cameroon) Christopher Mendouga (Ghana) Richard Baffour (Nigeria) Taro Godswill (Nigeria) Odah Marshall (Tanzania) Yahya Zayd |
| Al Ittihad | (Ivory Coast) Razack Cissé^{§} | (Libya) **Anis Saltou** | (Togo) Wilson Akakpo | (Uganda) Emmanuel Okwi | (Syria) **Omar Midani** | | (Brazil) Wallace da Silva (Ghana) Emmanuel Banahene (Guinea-Bissau) Toni Silva (Ivory Coast) Didier Koré (Libya) Ahmed Shalaby (Nigeria) Derick Ogbu |
| Al Masry | (Burkina Faso) Saïdou Simporé | (Ivory Coast) Cheick Moukoro | (Nigeria) Austin Amutu | (Nigeria) Emeka Eze | (Libya) Muftah Taktak | (Palestine) Mohammed Saleh | (Ghana) Torric Jebrin (Nigeria) Ezekiel Bassey |
| Misr Lel Makkasa | (Ethiopia) Shimelis Bekele | (Madagascar) Paulin Voavy | (Nigeria) Edu Moses | (Uganda) Khalid Aucho | | (Rwanda) Kevin Muhire^{†} | (Ghana) John Antwi |
| Al Mokawloon Al Arab | (Burkina Faso) Farouck Kabore | (Burkina Faso) Maarouf Youssef^{§} | (Colombia) Luis Hinestroza | (Nigeria) **Jacob Njoku**^{§} | (Tunisia) Seifeddine Jaziri | | (Nigeria) Kufre Ebong |
| Pyramids | (Burkina Faso) Eric Traoré | (Ghana) John Antwi | (Ivory Coast) Wilfried Kanon | (Uganda) Lumala Abdu | (Tunisia) Amor Layouni | (Brazil) Keno^{†} (Brazil) Ribamar^{†} (Nigeria) Azubuike Okechukwu^{†} (Peru) Cristian Benavente^{†} | (Ecuador) Jhon Cifuente (Palestine) Hamed Hamdan (Syria) Omar Kharbin (Syria) Omar Midani |
| Smouha | (Burkina Faso) Mohamed Koffi | (Democratic Republic of the Congo) Eddy Ngoyi | (Guinea) Maguette Diop | (Uganda) **Derrick Nsibambi** | (Libya) Mohamed Al Tarhoni | | (Cameroon) Ronald Ngah (Ethiopia) Oumed Oukri (Senegal) Cheikh Bamba (Uganda) Derrick Nsibambi |
| Tala'ea El Gaish | (Gabon) Franck Engonga | (Rwanda) **Kevin Muhire**^{§} | (Senegal) Talla N'Diaye | | | | (Nigeria) Chisom Chikatara (Togo) Richard Boro |
| Tanta | (Gabon) Bernard Mandrault | (Senegal) Alassane Diouf | (Uganda) Taddeo Lwanga | | | (Kenya) John Avire | (Senegal) Ismaël Bamba |
| Wadi Degla | (Ghana) Issahaku Yakubu | (Greece) Vasilis Bouzas | (Morocco) Abdelkabir El Ouadi | (Netherlands) **Rodney Antwi**^{§} | (Tunisia) Rafik Kabou | | (Ivory Coast) Yaya Soumahoro (Senegal) Ibrahima Ndiaye |
| Zamalek | (Democratic Republic of the Congo) **Kabongo Kasongo** | (Morocco) Achraf Bencharki | (Morocco) Mohamed Ounajem | (Tunisia) Ferjani Sassi | | (Burkina Faso) Maarouf Youssef^{†} (Ivory Coast) Razack Cissé^{†} (Morocco) Hamid Ahaddad^{†} | (Morocco) Khalid Boutaïb (Tunisia) Hamdi Nagguez |

== Results ==
=== League table ===
| Pos | Team | Pld | W | D | L | GF | GA | GD | Pts | Qualification or relegation |
|---|---|---|---|---|---|---|---|---|---|---|
| 1 | Al Ahly (C) | 34 | 28 | 5 | 1 | 74 | 8 | +66 | 89 | Qualification for the Champions League |
| 2 | Zamalek | 34 | 21 | 8 | 5 | 50 | 27 | +23 | 68 (Note: As a result of Zamalek refusing to play their away fixture against Al Ahly on 24 February 2020, the club was subject to a 3-point deduction following the conclusion of the season.) | Qualification for the Champions League |
| 3 | Pyramids | 34 | 19 | 8 | 7 | 54 | 33 | +21 | 65 | Qualification for the Confederation Cup (Note: Since the 2019–20 Egypt Cup wouldn't finish by the CAF deadline, the spot awarded to the Egypt Cup winners (Confederation Cup preliminary or first round) was passed to the fourth-placed team, Al Mokawloon Al Arab.) |
| 4 | Al Mokawloon Al Arab | 34 | 15 | 9 | 10 | 45 | 34 | +11 | 54 | Qualification for the Confederation Cup |
| 5 | Smouha | 34 | 11 | 18 | 5 | 44 | 33 | +11 | 51 | |
| 6 | ENPPI | 34 | 12 | 12 | 10 | 34 | 33 | +1 | 48 (Note: Head-to-head points: ENPPI 4, Al Masry 1.) | |
| 7 | Al Masry | 34 | 13 | 9 | 12 | 36 | 35 | +1 | 48 | |
| 8 | El Entag El Harby | 34 | 11 | 11 | 12 | 35 | 38 | −3 | 44 | |
| 9 | Misr Lel Makkasa | 34 | 10 | 12 | 12 | 40 | 39 | +1 | 42 (Note: Tied on head-to-head points (3). Head-to-head goal difference: Misr Lel Makkasa +1, Al Ittihad –1.) | |
| 10 | Al Ittihad | 34 | 9 | 15 | 10 | 36 | 36 | 0 | 42 | |
| 11 | Ismaily | 34 | 11 | 8 | 15 | 38 | 48 | −10 | 41 (Note: Head-to-head points: Ismaily 6, Tala'ea El Gaish 0.) | |
| 12 | Tala'ea El Gaish | 34 | 9 | 14 | 11 | 32 | 37 | −5 | 41 | |
| 13 | El Gouna | 34 | 10 | 7 | 17 | 32 | 45 | −13 | 37 (Note: Head-to-head points: El Gouna 4, Aswan 1.) | |
| 14 | Aswan | 34 | 9 | 10 | 15 | 39 | 50 | −11 | 37 | |
| 15 | Wadi Degla | 34 | 8 | 11 | 15 | 32 | 43 | −11 | 35 | |
| 16 | Haras El Hodoud (R) | 34 | 7 | 12 | 15 | 31 | 41 | −10 | 33 | Relegation to the Second Division |
| 17 | Tanta (R) | 34 | 3 | 13 | 18 | 22 | 55 | −33 | 22 | Relegation to the Second Division |
| 18 | FC Masr (R) | 34 | 3 | 12 | 19 | 18 | 57 | −39 | 21 | Relegation to the Second Division |

Source: Soccerway
Rules for classification: 1) Points; 2) Head-to-Head points; 3) Head-to-Head goal difference; 4) Head-to-Head goals scored; 5) Head-to-Head away goals scored; 6) Goal difference; 7) Goals scored.
(Note: Head-to-head record is used only after all the matches between the teams in question have been played).
(C) Champions; (R) Relegated

=== Positions by round ===
The table lists the positions of teams after each week of matches. In order to preserve chronological evolvements, any postponed matches are not included in the round at which they were originally scheduled, but added to the full round they were played immediately afterwards. For example, if a match is scheduled for matchday 13, but then postponed and played between days 16 and 17, it will be added to the standings for day 16.

| Team \ Round | 1 | 2 | 3 | 4 | 5 | 6 | 7 | 8 | 9 | 10 | 11 | 12 | 13 | 14 | 15 | 16 | 17 | 18 | 19 | 20 | 21 | 22 | 23 | 24 | 25 | 26 | 27 | 28 | 29 | 30 | 31 | 32 | 33 | 34 |
|---|---|---|---|---|---|---|---|---|---|---|---|---|---|---|---|---|---|---|---|---|---|---|---|---|---|---|---|---|---|---|---|---|---|---|
| Al Ahly | 5 | 2 | 1 | 1 | 1 | 3 | 2 | 1 | 1 | 1 | 1 | 1 | 1 | 1 | 1 | 1 | 1 | 1 | 1 | 1 | 1 | 1 | 1 | 1 | 1 | 1 | 1 | 1 | 1 | 1 | 1 | 1 | 1 | 1 |
| Zamalek | 8 | 3 | 4 | 4 | 3 | 5 | 4 | 4 | 4 | 6 | 4 | 3 | 3 | 4 | 5 | 3 | 4 | 3 | 2 | 2 | 2 | 3 | 3 | 2 | 2 | 2 | 2 | 2 | 2 | 2 | 2 | 2 | 2 | 2 |
| Pyramids | 1 | 1 | 2 | 2 | 2 | 4 | 5 | 7 | 7 | 5 | 6 | 5 | 5 | 5 | 3 | 5 | 3 | 2 | 3 | 4 | 3 | 2 | 2 | 3 | 3 | 4 | 3 | 3 | 3 | 3 | 3 | 3 | 3 | 3 |
| Al Mokawloon Al Arab | 6 | 5 | 3 | 3 | 4 | 2 | 1 | 3 | 3 | 2 | 2 | 2 | 2 | 2 | 2 | 2 | 2 | 4 | 4 | 3 | 4 | 4 | 4 | 4 | 4 | 3 | 4 | 4 | 4 | 4 | 4 | 4 | 4 | 4 |
| Smouha | 13 | 12 | 8 | 10 | 11 | 6 | 6 | 5 | 5 | 4 | 5 | 7 | 7 | 8 | 8 | 8 | 6 | 6 | 6 | 6 | 7 | 7 | 6 | 6 | 6 | 7 | 6 | 5 | 6 | 6 | 6 | 5 | 5 | 5 |
| ENPPI | 18 | 17 | 18 | 18 | 18 | 16 | 12 | 10 | 8 | 8 | 8 | 9 | 9 | 7 | 9 | 6 | 7 | 7 | 7 | 7 | 6 | 6 | 7 | 7 | 7 | 6 | 8 | 7 | 5 | 5 | 5 | 6 | 6 | 6 |
| Al Masry | 10 | 4 | 7 | 11 | 5 | 8 | 11 | 12 | 13 | 10 | 9 | 10 | 11 | 11 | 11 | 12 | 10 | 10 | 11 | 12 | 15 | 15 | 16 | 16 | 16 | 16 | 13 | 13 | 14 | 13 | 15 | 9 | 7 | 7 |
| El Entag El Harby | 2 | 9 | 13 | 8 | 10 | 11 | 10 | 8 | 6 | 7 | 7 | 8 | 8 | 6 | 6 | 7 | 8 | 8 | 8 | 8 | 8 | 10 | 13 | 9 | 9 | 9 | 12 | 11 | 11 | 11 | 9 | 13 | 8 | 8 |
| Misr Lel Makkasa | 3 | 6 | 11 | 7 | 7 | 10 | 13 | 14 | 14 | 14 | 16 | 16 | 13 | 15 | 15 | 17 | 16 | 14 | 15 | 13 | 11 | 11 | 12 | 8 | 8 | 8 | 7 | 8 | 7 | 7 | 7 | 7 | 11 | 9 |
| Al Ittihad | 12 | 8 | 5 | 5 | 6 | 1 | 3 | 2 | 2 | 3 | 3 | 4 | 4 | 3 | 4 | 4 | 5 | 5 | 5 | 5 | 5 | 5 | 5 | 5 | 5 | 5 | 5 | 6 | 8 | 8 | 8 | 8 | 12 | 10 |
| Ismaily | 4 | 10 | 6 | 9 | 9 | 12 | 8 | 6 | 9 | 9 | 11 | 11 | 10 | 10 | 7 | 9 | 9 | 9 | 9 | 9 | 9 | 8 | 8 | 10 | 10 | 10 | 10 | 12 | 12 | 12 | 10 | 10 | 9 | 11 |
| Tala'ea El Gaish | 16 | 15 | 14 | 15 | 15 | 15 | 16 | 13 | 15 | 15 | 12 | 13 | 14 | 16 | 16 | 13 | 14 | 15 | 16 | 16 | 13 | 14 | 11 | 12 | 14 | 11 | 11 | 10 | 9 | 9 | 11 | 11 | 10 | 12 |
| El Gouna | 15 | 18 | 12 | 13 | 14 | 17 | 17 | 16 | 11 | 13 | 14 | 12 | 12 | 14 | 12 | 11 | 12 | 11 | 10 | 11 | 14 | 16 | 14 | 14 | 11 | 13 | 15 | 15 | 13 | 15 | 14 | 15 | 13 | 13 |
| Aswan | 11 | 14 | 17 | 17 | 13 | 14 | 15 | 18 | 18 | 17 | 17 | 18 | 18 | 18 | 17 | 14 | 13 | 13 | 13 | 15 | 12 | 13 | 15 | 15 | 15 | 12 | 9 | 9 | 10 | 10 | 12 | 12 | 14 | 14 |
| Wadi Degla | 14 | 13 | 16 | 16 | 16 | 18 | 18 | 17 | 17 | 18 | 18 | 17 | 16 | 12 | 13 | 15 | 17 | 17 | 14 | 14 | 16 | 12 | 9 | 13 | 12 | 14 | 16 | 16 | 16 | 14 | 13 | 14 | 15 | 15 |
| Haras El Hodoud | 9 | 11 | 10 | 6 | 8 | 7 | 7 | 9 | 10 | 11 | 10 | 6 | 6 | 9 | 10 | 10 | 11 | 12 | 12 | 10 | 10 | 9 | 10 | 11 | 13 | 15 | 14 | 14 | 15 | 16 | 16 | 16 | 16 | 16 |
| Tanta | 7 | 7 | 9 | 12 | 12 | 9 | 9 | 11 | 12 | 12 | 15 | 15 | 17 | 13 | 14 | 16 | 15 | 16 | 17 | 17 | 17 | 18 | 18 | 18 | 18 | 18 | 18 | 18 | 18 | 18 | 18 | 18 | 18 | 17 |
| FC Masr | 17 | 16 | 15 | 14 | 17 | 13 | 14 | 15 | 16 | 16 | 13 | 14 | 15 | 17 | 18 | 18 | 18 | 18 | 18 | 18 | 18 | 17 | 17 | 17 | 17 | 17 | 17 | 17 | 17 | 17 | 17 | 17 | 17 | 18 |

Source: Soccerway

| Leader |
| 2020–21 CAF Champions League |
| 2020–21 CAF Confederation Cup |
| Relegation to the 2020–21 Egyptian Second Division |

=== Results table ===
| Home \ Away | AHL | ASW | ENP | ENT | FCM | GOU | HRS | ISM | ITH | MAS | MMK | MOK | PYR | SMO | TGS | TNT | WDG | ZAM |
|---|---|---|---|---|---|---|---|---|---|---|---|---|---|---|---|---|---|---|
| Al Ahly | — | 3–0 | 2–0 | 4–0 | 3–1 | 1–0 | 1–0 | 3–0 | 4–0 | 3–0 | 0–0 | 1–0 | 0–0 | 1–1 | 3–0 | 5–0 | 2–0 | 2–0 (Note: Al Ahly were awarded a 2–0 win after Zamalek did not show up for the match.) |
| Aswan | 1–5 | — | 1–0 | 0–1 | 1–1 | 1–1 | 2–1 | 2–1 | 1–3 | 0–1 | 2–3 | 1–0 | 1–2 | 3–3 | 1–1 | 4–0 | 1–3 | 1–0 |
| ENPPI | 0–3 | 1–1 | — | 0–0 | 2–1 | 0–0 | 0–0 | 1–0 | 0–0 | 1–0 | 1–0 | 2–1 | 0–1 | 0–0 | 1–1 | 1–2 | 2–1 | 2–1 |
| El Entag El Harby | 1–1 | 0–2 | 0–2 | — | 3–0 | 2–1 | 1–0 | 0–1 | 0–0 | 1–1 | 0–0 | 0–1 | 2–3 | 1–1 | 0–1 | 3–0 | 1–4 | 0–0 |
| FC Masr | 0–3 | 0–0 | 1–1 | 0–3 | — | 0–0 | 1–1 | 0–1 | 2–2 | 0–0 | 2–2 | 1–3 | 1–2 | 0–1 | 0–1 | 2–1 | 1–0 | 0–0 |
| El Gouna | 0–4 | 1–0 | 1–4 | 0–0 | 0–1 | — | 1–2 | 0–1 | 1–1 | 0–2 | 1–0 | 2–0 | 2–1 | 1–2 | 2–0 | 2–0 | 1–0 | 0–2 |
| Haras El Hodoud | 0–2 | 1–2 | 3–2 | 1–3 | 0–0 | 2–2 | — | 2–2 | 0–1 | 1–2 | 1–1 | 0–1 | 1–0 | 0–0 | 0–0 | 1–1 | 2–2 | 1–2 |
| Ismaily | 0–1 | 4–2 | 1–1 | 3–2 | 4–0 | 1–1 | 0–1 | — | 1–3 | 1–3 | 2–0 | 1–1 | 1–3 | 1–1 | 2–1 | 0–0 | 1–1 | 1–2 |
| Al Ittihad | 0–0 | 0–1 | 0–2 | 1–2 | 2–1 | 1–0 | 1–1 | 3–0 | — | 1–2 | 1–3 | 0–1 | 1–1 | 1–1 | 2–2 | 0–0 | 1–1 | 1–1 |
| Al Masry | 0–2 | 2–2 | 1–1 | 2–2 | 2–0 | 1–2 | 1–1 | 2–0 | 0–1 | — | 0–2 | 0–1 | 1–1 | 2–1 | 0–0 | 2–2 | 2–1 | 0–1 |
| Misr Lel Makkasa | 0–2 | 2–1 | 1–1 | 1–1 | 3–0 | 1–0 | 1–2 | 4–1 | 2–3 | 1–0 | — | 1–0 | 2–3 | 0–0 | 1–1 | 1–1 | 1–3 | 0–1 |
| Al Mokawloon Al Arab | 0–2 | 2–1 | 0–2 | 2–1 | 6–0 | 2–0 | 3–2 | 2–0 | 1–1 | 2–0 | 1–1 | — | 0–2 | 2–2 | 1–1 | 2–0 | 0–1 | 2–1 |
| Pyramids | 1–2 | 2–2 | 4–0 | 3–0 | 1–0 | 2–3 | 1–0 | 1–0 | 1–0 | 0–1 | 3–1 | 2–2 | — | 0–0 | 2–2 | 3–0 | 1–0 | 0–2 |
| Smouha | 0–1 | 1–0 | 2–1 | 1–2 | 2–0 | 2–1 | 2–0 | 1–1 | 2–1 | 2–0 | 1–1 | 1–1 | 1–2 | — | 2–1 | 3–0 | 2–3 | 3–3 |
| Tala'ea El Gaish | 0–3 | 0–0 | 0–0 | 0–0 | 4–0 | 4–1 | 0–3 | 0–1 | 0–3 | 0–1 | 1–0 | 0–1 | 2–2 | 1–1 | — | 1–0 | 1–0 | 3–2 |
| Tanta | 0–1 | 2–2 | 0–0 | 0–1 | 0–0 | 1–0 | 0–1 | 1–3 | 1–1 | 1–2 | 0–2 | 2–2 | 1–2 | 2–2 | 0–0 | — | 0–0 | 2–3 |
| Wadi Degla | 0–3 | 1–0 | 2–3 | 1–1 | 2–1 | 0–2 | 1–0 | 0–1 | 0–0 | 0–3 | 2–2 | 1–1 | 0–2 | 0–0 | 1–3 | 0–1 | — | 1–1 |
| Zamalek | 3–1 | 2–0 | 1–0 | 1–0 | 1–1 | 4–3 | 2–0 | 3–1 | 1–0 | 1–0 | 1–0 | 2–1 | 2–0 | 0–0 | 1–0 | 3–1 | 0–0 | — |

Updated to match(es) played on 31 October 2020. Source: Soccerway
Legend: Blue = home team win; Yellow = draw; Red = away team win.
For upcoming matches, an "a" indicates there is an article about the rivalry between the two participants.

== Season statistics ==
As of 31 October 2020

=== Scoring ===
- First goal of the season:
  (Tunisia) Seifeddine Jaziri for Al Mokawloon Al Arab against Tala'ea El Gaish (21 September 2019)

==== Top scorers ====
| Rank | Player | Club | Goals |
|---|---|---|---|
| 1 | (Egypt) Abdallah El Said | Pyramids | 17 (Note: 17 goals according to the Egyptian Football Association, and 16 goals according to Soccerway.) |
| 2 | (Egypt) Mohamed Sherif | ENPPI | 14 |
| 3 | (Democratic Republic of the Congo) Walter Bwalya | El Gouna | 13 |
| 4 | (Tunisia) Seifeddine Jaziri | Al Mokawloon Al Arab | 11 |
| 4 | (Egypt) Mostafa Mohamed | Zamalek | 11 |
| 6 | (Egypt) Mahmoud Alaa | Zamalek | 10 |
| 6 | (Egypt) Hossam Hassan | Smouha | 10 |
| 8 | (Ghana) John Antwi | Pyramids | 9 |
| 8 | (Egypt) Walid Soliman | Al Ahly | 9 |
| 10 | (Egypt) Amr El Halwani | Haras El Hodoud | 8 |
| 10 | (Egypt) Abdel Rahman Magdy | Ismaily | 8 |
| 10 | (Egypt) Basem Morsy | El Entag El Harby | 8 |
| 10 | (Egypt) Fady Farid | Aswan | 8 |

==== Hat-tricks ====
| Player | For | Against | Result | Date | Ref |
|---|---|---|---|---|---|
| (Egypt) Walid Soliman | Al Ahly | El Gouna | 4–0 (A) | 25 November 2019 | |
| (Egypt) Mohamed Grendo | Haras El Hodoud | Tala'ea El Gaish | 3–0 (A) | 8 January 2020 | |
| (Egypt) Abdallah El Said | Pyramids | Tanta | 3–0 (H) | 10 August 2020 | |
| (Egypt) Mohamed Abdel Maguid | Aswan | Smouha | 3–3 (H) | 5 September 2020 | |
| (Tunisia) Rafik Kabou | Wadi Degla | El Entag El Harby | 4–1 (A) | 28 September 2020 | |

Note

(H) – Home; (A) – Away

==== Top assists ====
| Rank | Player | Club | Assists |
|---|---|---|---|
| 1 | (Egypt) Nasser Maher | Smouha | 10 |
| 2 | (Egypt) Mohamed Magdy | Al Ahly | 7 |
| 2 | (Egypt) Youssef Obama | Zamalek | 7 |
| 2 | (Egypt) Ahmed Shedid | El Entag El Harby | 7 |
| 2 | (Egypt) Karim Tarek | Tala'ea El Gaish | 7 |
| 6 | (Tunisia) Ali Maâloul | Al Ahly | 6 |
| 6 | (Cameroon) Jonathan Ngwem | El Gouna | 6 |
| 6 | (Egypt) Ahmed Refaat | Al Ittihad | 6 |
| 6 | (Egypt) Abdallah El Said | Pyramids | 6 |
| 6 | (Ghana) Issahaku Yakubu | Wadi Degla | 6 |

=== Clean sheets ===
| Rank | Player | Club | Clean sheets |
|---|---|---|---|
| 1 | (Egypt) Mohamed El Shenawy | Al Ahly | 25 |
| 2 | (Egypt) Amer Mohamed | El Entag El Harby | 12 |
| 3 | (Egypt) Mohamed Bassam | Tala'ea El Gaish | 11 |
| 3 | (Egypt) Mahmoud Gad | ENPPI | 11 |
| 5 | (Egypt) Mohamed Abou Gabal | Zamalek | 10 |
| 5 | (Egypt) El Mahdy Soliman | Pyramids | 10 |
| 5 | (Egypt) El Hany Soliman | Smouha | 10 |
| 8 | (Egypt) Mahmoud Abou El Saoud | Al Mokawloon Al Arab | 9 |
| 8 | (Egypt) Ahmed Masoud | Al Masry | 9 |

=== Discipline ===
==== Player ====
- Most yellow cards: 11
  - (Egypt) Amr El Sisi (Tala'ea El Gaish)
- Most red cards: 2
  - (Nigeria) Emeka Eze (Al Masry)
  - (Egypt) Tarek Hamed (Zamalek)
  - (Ghana) Solomon Mensah (Aswan)
  - (Egypt) Ahmed Said Ouka (FC Masr)
  - (Egypt) Ramy Rabia (Al Ahly)
  - (Egypt) Islam Saleh (FC Masr)
  - (Tunisia) Ferjani Sassi (Zamalek)
  - (Egypt) Mohamed Abdel Razek (Tala'ea El Gaish)

==== Club ====
- Most yellow cards: 75
  - Tala'ea El Gaish
- Most red cards: 8
  - Al Mokawloon Al Arab

== Number of teams by governorate ==
| Number of teams | Governorate | Team(s) |
|---|---|---|
| 9 | Cairo | Al Ahly, ENPPI, El Entag El Harby, FC Masr, Al Mokawloon Al Arab, Pyramids, Tala'ea El Gaish, Wadi Degla and Zamalek |
| 3 | Alexandria | Haras El Hodoud, Al Ittihad and Smouha |
| 1 | Aswan | Aswan |
| 1 | Faiyum | Misr Lel Makkasa |
| 1 | El Gharbia | Tanta |
| 1 | Ismailia | Ismaily |
| 1 | Port Said | Al Masry |
| 1 | Red Sea | El Gouna |
