= 2019–20 Egypt Cup =

Tournament details
- Country: Egypt
- Dates: 15 October – 23 November 2019 (qualifying competition); 2 December 2019 – 5 December 2020 (main competition)
- Teams: 262 (overall); 244 (qualifying competition); 32 (main competition)

Final positions
- Champions: Al Ahly (37th title)
- Runners-up: Tala'ea El Gaish
- Confederation Cup: Al Mokawloon Al Arab (Note: Since the competition wouldn't finish by the CAF deadline (1 November 2020) for associations to submit participating teams in African competitions for the 2020–21 season, the spot awarded to the Egypt Cup winners (Confederation Cup preliminary or first round) was passed to the fourth-placed team in the 2019–20 Egyptian Premier League, Al Mokawloon Al Arab.)

Tournament statistics
- Matches played: 31
- Goals scored: 74 (2.39 per match)
- Top goal scorer(s): Shoukry Naguib (3 goals)

The 2019–20 Egypt Cup was the 88th edition of the oldest recognised football tournament in Africa. It is sponsored by Tiger Chips, and known as the Tiger Egypt Cup for sponsorship purposes. It started with the First Preliminary Round on 15 October 2019, and concluded with the final on 5 December 2020.

Egyptian Premier League side Zamalek, who had won the last two titles, were eliminated by Tala'ea El Gaish in the semi-finals following a 3–1 defeat after extra time.

Al Ahly defeated Tala'ea El Gaish in the final won the match 3–2 on penalties, after the original and extra time ended 1–1, winning their 37th Egypt Cup title.

On 14 March 2020, a decision was made by the Egyptian Football Association to postpone all football activities in Egypt due to the spread of the COVID-19 pandemic in the country. The initial suspension, until 29 March, was then extended multiple times until at least mid-July. On 2 July 2020, the EFA announced that football competitions in Egypt would resume, with the Premier League recommencing on 6 August, Second Division on 21 September and Egypt Cup on 30 September. The EFA also confirmed that all clubs' players and staff would be tested for COVID-19 before resuming training.

== Teams ==
Round	Clubs remaining	Clubs involved	Winners from previous round	New entries this round	Leagues entering at this round
Qualifying phase (Note: Some teams received a bye in the first, second and fourth preliminary rounds in order to balance the draw, as many teams from the lower divisions did not enter the competition.)
First Preliminary Round	266	208	none	208	Egyptian Third Division; Egyptian Fourth Division
Second Preliminary Round	151	94	104	1	none
Third Preliminary Round	104	86	47	35	Egyptian Second Division
Fourth Preliminary Round	61	15	15	none	none
Fifth Preliminary Round	46	28	15	none	none
Main competition
Round of 32	32	32	14	18	Egyptian Premier League
Round of 16	16	16	16	none	none
Quarter-finals	8	8	8	none	none
Semi-finals	4	4	4	none	none
Final	2	2	2	none	none

== Round and draw dates ==
The schedule was as follows.

Phase	Round	Draw date	First match date
Qualifying phase	First Preliminary Round	10 October 2019	15 October 2019
Qualifying phase	Second Preliminary Round	10 October 2019	19 October 2019
Qualifying phase	Third Preliminary Round	22 October 2019	25 October 2019
Qualifying phase	Fourth Preliminary Round	22 October 2019	13 November 2019
Qualifying phase	Fifth Preliminary Round	17 November 2019	20 November 2019
Main competition	Round of 32	24 November 2019	2 December 2019
Main competition	Round of 16	24 November 2019	15 February 2020
Main competition	Quarter-finals	24 November 2019	14 October 2020
Main competition	Semi-finals	24 November 2019	1 December 2020
Main competition	Final	24 November 2019	5 December 2020

== Format ==
=== Participation ===
The Egypt Cup began with a round of 32 teams. The 18 teams of the Egyptian Premier League, along with the 14 winning teams qualified from the Fifth Preliminary Round of the 2019–20 Egypt Cup qualifying rounds.

=== Draw ===
The draw for the main competition was held at the Egyptian Football Association headquarters in Gezira, Cairo on 24 November 2019 and was broadcast live on ON Sport.

The 32 participating teams were separated into 3 pots. Pot 1 included the 15th placed team from the previous season of the Egyptian Premier League alongside the 3 promoted teams from the 2018–19 Egyptian Second Division, Pot 2 included the top 14 teams from the previous season of the Egyptian Premier League, and Pot 3 included all 14 teams who qualified to the competition through the qualifying rounds.

Teams from Pot 1 were drawn against each other, while teams from Pot 2 were drawn against teams from Pot 3.

Similar to previous season, the Egypt Cup defending champions, Zamalek, and the Egyptian Premier League champions, Al Ahly, were placed in different paths; meaning that both teams could face each other only in the final.

Pot	Pot 1	Pot 2	Pot 3
Teams	Aswan; FC Masr; El Gouna (Note: An additional draw was held between teams who finished from 12th to 15th in the 2018–19 Egyptian Premier League (Smouha, El Entag El Harby, El Gouna and Haras El Hodoud; all of those teams had 38 points) to decide which team will be allocated to Pot 1, despite Haras El Hodoud finished last on head-to-head record. The draw resulted in El Gouna being allocated to Pot 1, while the rest of the teams were allocated to Pot 2.); Tanta	Al Ahly; ENPPI; El Entag El Harby; Haras El Hodoud; Ismaily; Al Ittihad; Al Masry; Misr Lel Makkasa; Al Mokawloon Al Arab; Pyramids; Smouha; Tala'ea El Gaish; Wadi Degla; Zamalek	Abou Qir Fertilizers; Beni Suef; Biyala; Dikernis; Al Jazeera; Media; Al Nasr; Nogoom; Al Obour; Petrojet; Pharco; Qena; El Sharkia; Tersana

=== Match rules ===
Teams met in one game per round. Matches took place for 90 minutes, with two halves of 45 minutes each. If still tied after regulation, 30 minutes of extra time were played, consisting of two periods of 15 minutes each. If the score was still level after this, the match was decided by a penalty shoot-out. A coin toss decided who took the first penalty. A total of seven players were allowed to be listed on the substitute bench, with up to three substitutions being allowed during regulation.

All matches were played at venues selected by the Egyptian Football Association, except in the round of 32, where matches were hosted by the team drawn first.

=== Champion qualification ===
The winners of the Egypt Cup earned automatic qualification for the 2020–21 CAF Confederation Cup. If they had already qualified for the CAF Confederation Cup or CAF Champions League through their position in the Egyptian Premier League, then the spot went to the cup runners-up. If the cup runners-up also qualified for an African competition through their league position, then the spot was given to the fourth-placed team in the league.

== Qualifying rounds ==
All of the competing teams that were not members of the Egyptian Premier League had to compete in the qualifying rounds to secure one of 14 available places in the Round of 32. The qualifying phase began with the First Preliminary Round on 15 October 2019, and concluded with the Fifth Preliminary Round on 23 November 2019.

== Round of 32 ==
The matches were played from 2 to 8 December 2019. This round included four teams from the Egyptian Third Division, Al Jazeera, Al Obour, Qena and El Sharkia, the lowest ranking sides left in the competition.

All times are CAT (UTC+2).

2 December 2019	Wadi Degla (1)	4–0	Biyala (2)	New Cairo, Cairo
14:30	Reda 17'; Kabou 37'; El Ouadi 44' (pen.); Mohamed 90+3'	Report		Stadium: Petro Sport Stadium; Referee: Mostafa El Shohdy

2 December 2019	Misr Lel Makkasa (1)	2–0	Pharco (2)	Al Salam City, Cairo
19:30	Marey 33'; Mosaad 36'	Report		Stadium: Al Salam Stadium; Referee: Atef Hussein

3 December 2019	FC Masr (1)	0–0 (a.e.t.) (4–3 p)	El Gouna (1)	Heliopolis, Cairo
17:00		Report		Stadium: Cairo Military Academy Stadium; Referee: Galal Ahmed
	Penalties
	Ouka (penalty scored); Abdel Hamid (penalty scored); Sultan (penalty scored); Gamal (penalty missed); Shabana (penalty missed); Ashraf (penalty scored)		(penalty scored) Hamdy; (penalty scored) Amoury; (penalty scored) Tawfik; (penalty missed) Naguib; (penalty missed) Shabrawy; (penalty missed) Ali

3 December 2019	Al Ahly (1)	3–1	Beni Suef (2)	Nasr City, Cairo
19:30	Azaro 67', 90+2'; El Sheikh 69'	Report	Abdel Razek 88'	Stadium: Cairo International Stadium; Referee: Mohamed Abbas

4 December 2019	Al Mokawloon Al Arab (1)	2–0	Al Jazeera (3)	Nasr City, Cairo
14:30	Naguib 44' (pen.); Yaisien 87'	Report		Stadium: Osman Ahmed Osman Stadium; Referee: Amr El Shenawy

4 December 2019	Zamalek (1)	3–1	El Sharkia (3)	Nasr City, Cairo
19:30	Bencharki 24', 77'; Sassi 41'	Report	Abdel Wahed 90+1'	Stadium: Cairo International Stadium; Referee: Mahmoud Wafa

5 December 2019	El Entag El Harby (1)	1–1 (a.e.t.) (2–4 p)	Abou Qir Fertilizers (2)	Al Salam City, Cairo
14:30	Mo. El Badry 62'	Report	Badr 90'	Stadium: Al Salam Stadium; Referee: Ahmed Nagy
	Penalties
	Ma. El Badry (penalty missed); Bazoka (penalty missed); Trabelsi (penalty scored); Abdel Khalek (penalty scored)		(penalty scored) Ezzat; (penalty scored) El Kiki; (penalty scored) Ragab; (penalty scored) Yehia

5 December 2019	Al Masry (1)	4–0	Qena (3)	Attaka, Suez
17:00	Yasser 25'; Wadi 42'; Magdy 63'; El Eraky 83'	Report		Stadium: Egyptian Army Stadium; Referee: Khaled El Ghandour

5 December 2019	Pyramids (1)	6–1	Nogoom (2)	New Cairo, Cairo
19:30	El Gabbas 19', 56'; Hassan 44'; El Sayed 69' (o.g.); Bakry 75'; Antwi 84'	Report	El Tawila 14'	Stadium: 30 June Stadium; Referee: Amr Ayed

6 December 2019	Smouha (1)	1–0	Al Obour (3)	Shatby, Alexandria
15:00	Hassan 66'	Report		Stadium: Alexandria Stadium; Referee: Sayed Shaaban

6 December 2019	ENPPI (1)	0–0 (a.e.t.) (3–4 p)	Tersana (2)	New Cairo, Cairo
17:30		Report		Stadium: Petro Sport Stadium; Referee: Mahmoud Hussein
	Penalties
	Yehia (penalty scored); Fawzy (penalty missed); Galal (penalty scored); Mao (penalty missed); Roaa (penalty scored); Fouad (penalty missed)		(penalty scored) Ashraf; (penalty missed) Shaker; (penalty scored) Hazem; (penalty missed) Hamdy; (penalty scored) Gaafar; (penalty scored) M. Hussein

7 December 2019	Haras El Hodoud (1)	1–0	Petrojet (2)	El Max, Alexandria
14:30	Ali 70' (pen.)	Report		Stadium: Haras El Hodoud Stadium; Referee: Mahmoud Nasef

7 December 2019	Al Ittihad (1)	1–0	Al Nasr (2)	Shatby, Alexandria
14:30	Cissé 65'	Report		Stadium: Alexandria Stadium; Referee: Sabry Ibrahim

7 December 2019	Tala'ea El Gaish (1)	1–0	Dikernis (2)	Nasr City, Cairo
17:00	Salama 66'	Report		Stadium: Gehaz El Reyada Stadium; Referee: Ahmed Abdallah

7 December 2019	Ismaily (1)	2–0	Media (2)	Ismailia
17:00	Makhlouf 32'; Piqueti 43'	Report		Stadium: Ismailia Stadium; Referee: Amr Abdeen

8 December 2019	Aswan (1)	1–1 (a.e.t.) (5–4 p)	Tanta (1)	Aswan
13:45	Youssef 80'	Report	El Dah 74'	Stadium: Aswan Stadium; Referee: Sobhy El Amrawy
	Penalties
	Dao (penalty scored); El Kadi (penalty scored); Gaber (penalty scored); Oukri (penalty scored); Farid (penalty scored)		(penalty scored) Kabonga; (penalty missed) Onosh; (penalty scored) Salah; (penalty scored) Adel; (penalty scored) El Dah

== Round of 16 ==
The matches were played between 15 February and 5 October 2020. Matches involving Al Ahly and Zamalek were postponed to avoid scheduling conflicts with their postponed league games. This round included two teams from the Egyptian Second Division, Abou Qir Fertilizers and Tersana, the lowest ranking sides left in the competition.

All times are CAT (UTC+2).

15 February 2020	Abou Qir Fertilizers (2)	2–0	Haras El Hodoud (1)	Shatby, Alexandria
14:00	El Aash 9' (pen.); El Sayed 79'	Report		Stadium: Alexandria Stadium; Referee: Mohamed Hassan

15 February 2020	Al Ittihad (1)	2–1	Aswan (1)	Nasr City, Cairo
17:00	El Sanghawy 25' (o.g.); El Sabahy 55'	Report	Abdel Maguid 69' (pen.)	Stadium: Osman Ahmed Osman Stadium; Referee: Mahmoud El Banna

16 February 2020	Wadi Degla (1)	1–2	FC Masr (1)	Al Salam City, Cairo
14:00	Omran 72'	Report	Furtado 44', 85'	Stadium: Al Salam Stadium; Referee: Walid Abdel Razek

17 February 2020	Tala'ea El Gaish (1)	1–0	Misr Lel Makkasa (1)	New Cairo, Cairo
17:00	Muhire 19'	Report		Stadium: Petro Sport Stadium; Referee: Mohamed Salama

19 February 2020	Al Mokawloon Al Arab (1)	4–0	Al Masry (1)	Suez City, Suez
17:00	Naguib 22'; Essam 41', 68'; Youssef 90+3'	Report		Stadium: Suez Stadium; Referee: Tarek Magdy

21 February 2020	Ismaily (1)	0–1	Pyramids (1)	Shatby, Alexandria
17:00		Report	Antwi 6'	Stadium: Alexandria Stadium; Referee: Amin Omar

30 September 2020	Al Ahly (1)	2–1	Tersana (2)	Al Salam City, Cairo
20:00	Ajayi 7', 15'	Report	Mansour 42'	Stadium: Al Salam Stadium; Referee: Ahmed Gamal

5 October 2020	Zamalek (1)	2–1 (a.e.t.)	Smouha (1)	Ismailia
20:00	Ashour 81'; Sayed 114'	Report	Mohsen 55'	Stadium: Ismailia Stadium; Referee: Tarek Magdy

== Quarter-finals ==
The matches were played from 14 October to 21 November 2020. This round included one team from the Egyptian Second Division, Abou Qir Fertilizers, the lowest ranking side left in the competition.

All times are CAT (UTC+2).

14 October 2020	Tala'ea El Gaish (1)	0–0 (a.e.t.) (3–1 p)	Pyramids (1)	Nasr City, Cairo
20:30		Report		Stadium: Osman Ahmed Osman Stadium; Referee: Mahmoud Ashour
	Penalties
	Roaa (penalty scored); Kabouria (penalty scored); El Fil (penalty scored)		(penalty missed) Antwi; (penalty scored) El Gabbas; (penalty missed) Gabr; (penalty missed) Hamada

22 October 2020	Al Ittihad (1)	2–1	Al Mokawloon Al Arab (1)	Suez City, Suez
20:00	Kamar 49'; Salem 90+4'	Report	Naguib 47'	Stadium: Suez Stadium; Referee: Mohamed Adel

21 November 2020	Al Ahly (1)	2–1	Abou Qir Fertilizers (2)	Borg El Arab, Alexandria
17:00	Soliman 15', 26' (pen.)	Report	Kouyaté 38'	Stadium: Borg El Arab Stadium; Referee: Mohamed Salama

21 November 2020	Zamalek (1)	2–1 (a.e.t.)	FC Masr (1)	Suez City, Suez
20:00	Faisal 90+6'; Sayed 116' (pen.)	Report	Gondaya 85'	Stadium: Suez Stadium; Referee: Mahmoud Ashour

== Semi-finals ==
The matches were played on 1 December 2020.

All times are CAT (UTC+2).

1 December 2020	Zamalek (1)	1–3 (a.e.t.)	Tala'ea El Gaish (1)	Borg El Arab, Alexandria
17:00	Shikabala 45+2'	Report	Samir 36', 95' (pen.); Marey 113'	Stadium: Borg El Arab Stadium; Referee: Mahmoud El Banna

1 December 2020	Al Ahly (1)	2–1	Al Ittihad (1)	Suez City, Suez
20:00	Magdy 71'; H. Fathy 89'	Report	Cissé 35'	Stadium: Suez Stadium; Referee: Mohamed Maarouf

== Final ==
5 December 2020
20:00 CAT

Al Ahly	1–1 (a.e.t.)	Tala'ea El Gaish
Kahraba 65'	Report	Mansi 90+2'
Penalties
Maâloul (penalty scored); El Solia (penalty scored); Benoun (penalty scored); Ashraf (penalty missed); Afsha (penalty missed)	3–2	(penalty scored) Mohareb; (penalty missed) Mansi; (penalty missed) Sotohi; (penalty scored) M. Gamal; (penalty missed) El Sayed

Borg El Arab Stadium, Alexandria
Referee: Mohamed El Hanafy

== Bracket ==
The following is the bracket which the Egypt Cup resembles. Numbers in parentheses next to the match score represent the results of a penalty shoot-out.

Round of 32; 2–8 December 2019
Al Ahly	3
Beni Suef	1
ENPPI	0 (3)
Tersana (p)	0 (4)
El Entag El Harby	1 (2)
Abou Qir Fertilizers (p)	1 (4)
Haras El Hodoud	1
Petrojet	0
Al Ittihad	1
Al Nasr	0
Aswan (p)	1 (5)
Tanta	1 (4)
Al Mokawloon Al Arab	2
Al Jazeera	0
Al Masry	4
Qena	0
Zamalek	3
El Sharkia	1
Smouha	1
Al Obour	0
Wadi Degla	4
Biyala	0
FC Masr (p)	0 (4)
El Gouna	0 (3)
Tala'ea El Gaish	1
Dikernis	0
Misr Lel Makkasa	2
Pharco	0
Ismaily	2
Media	0
Pyramids	6
Nogoom	1

Round of 16; 15 February – 5 October 2020
Al Ahly	2
Tersana	1
Abou Qir Fertilizers	2
Haras El Hodoud	0
Al Ittihad	2
Aswan	1
Al Mokawloon Al Arab	4
Al Masry	0
Zamalek (a.e.t.)	2
Smouha	1
Wadi Degla	1
FC Masr	2
Tala'ea El Gaish	1
Misr Lel Makkasa	0
Ismaily	0
Pyramids	1

Quarter-finals; 14 October – 21 November 2020
Al Ahly	2
Abou Qir Fertilizers	1
Al Ittihad	2
Al Mokawloon Al Arab	1
Zamalek (a.e.t.)	2
FC Masr	1
Tala'ea El Gaish (p)	0 (3)
Pyramids	0 (1)

Semi-finals; 1 December 2020
Al Ahly	2
Al Ittihad	1
Zamalek	1
Tala'ea El Gaish (a.e.t.)	3

Final; 5 December 2020
Al Ahly (p)	1 (3)
Tala'ea El Gaish	1 (2)

== Top goalscorers ==
Rank	Player	Club	Goals
1	(Egypt) Shoukry Naguib	Al Mokawloon Al Arab	3
2	(Nigeria) Junior Ajayi	Al Ahly	2
2	(Ghana) John Antwi	Pyramids	2
2	(Morocco) Walid Azaro	Al Ahly	2
2	(Morocco) Achraf Bencharki	Zamalek	2
2	(Ivory Coast) Razack Cissé	Al Ittihad	2
2	(Egypt) Mohamed Essam	Al Mokawloon Al Arab	2
2	(Cape Verde) Willis Furtado	FC Masr	2
2	(Egypt) Mohamed El Gabbas	Pyramids	2
2	(Egypt) Amr Marey (Note: Amr Marey transferred from Misr Lel Makkasa to Tala'ea El Gaish during the summer transfer window.)	Misr Lel Makkasa/Tala'ea El Gaish	2
2	(Egypt) Ahmed Samir	Tala'ea El Gaish	2
2	(Egypt) Ahmed Sayed	Zamalek	2
2	(Egypt) Walid Soliman	Al Ahly	2
