= 2022–23 Tala'ea El Gaish SC season =

Tala'ea El Gaish SC
2022–23 season
- Manager: Alaa Abdel Aal (until 2 November); Mohamed Youssef (from 3 November until 9 February); Imad Al-Nahhas (from 9 February)
- Stadium: Gehaz El Reyada Stadium
- Egyptian Premier League: 14th
- Egypt Cup: Round of 16
- EFA Cup: Round of 16
- Arab Club Champions Cup: First qualifying round
- Biggest win: Tala'ea El Gaish 3–1 Al Masry
- Biggest defeat: Tala'ea El Gaish 0–4 Zamalek

The 2022–23 Tala'ea El Gaish SC season was the club's 26th season in existence and the 19th consecutive season in the top flight of Egyptian football. In addition to the domestic league, Tala'ea El Gaish participated in this season's editions of the Egypt Cup, the EFA Cup and the Arab Club Champions Cup.

== Players ==
=== First-team squad ===
As of 15 January 2023

Note: Flags indicate national team as defined under FIFA eligibility rules; some limited exceptions apply. Players may hold more than one non-FIFA nationality.

No.	Pos.	Nation	Player
4	DF	EGY	Mohamed Fathallah
19	MF	EGY	Ahmed Samir
11	FW	EGY	Karim Tarek
21	FW	EGY	Ahmed Meteb
8	MF	EGY	Ahmed Abdel Rahman Zola
12	MF	EGY	Islam Mohareb
23	MF	EGY	Abdel Rahman Osama
37	MF	EGY	Mohamed Shehata
3	DF	EGY	Ahmed Ayman Mansour
1	GK	EGY	Omar Radwan
17	MF	EGY	Ali El Zahdi
6	DF	EGY	Khaled Stouhi
9	FW	EGY	Khaled Kamar
25	DF	EGY	Mohamed Diab
22	MF	EGY	Mostafa Khawaga

No.	Pos.	Nation	Player
20	MF	EGY	Ali Hamdy
24	MF	EGY	Mohamed Sherif
31	DF	EGY	Mohamed Samir
10	MF	EGY	Ashraf Magdy
36	FW	EGY	Marwan Osman
—	GK	EGY	Emad El Sayed
15	MF	EGY	Hassan Magdy
5	MF	EGY	Farid Shawky (on loan from Al Masry)
29	FW	PLE	Mahmoud Wadi (on loan from Pyramids)
35	FW	EGY	Fares Hatem
14	DF	EGY	Mahmoud Waheed
18	GK	EGY	Ahmed Massoud
26	MF	EGY	Arabi Badr
28	MF	EGY	Karim Halawa
7	DF	EGY	Yehia Hamed

== Transfers ==
=== In ===
No.	Pos	Player	Transferred from	Fee	Date	Source
7	DF	(Egypt) Yehia Hamed	(Egypt) Ghazl El Mahalla	LE 1,250,000	22 September 2022	
18	GK	(Egypt) Ahmed Masoud	Free transfer		7 January 2023	
5	MF	(Egypt) Farid Shawky	(Egypt) Al Masry	Loan	10 January 2023	
29	FW	(Palestine) Mahmoud Wadi	(Egypt) Pyramids	Loan	15 January 2023	

=== Out ===
No.	Pos	Player	Transferred to	Fee	Date	Source
	MF	(Egypt) Mostafa El-Zenary	(Egypt) Zamalek	Undisclosed	21 September 2022	
	MF	(Egypt) Amr El Sisi	(Egypt) Zamalek	LE 20,000,000	10 October 2022	

== Pre-season and friendlies ==
Win Draw Loss

29 September 2022 Friendly	Al Ahly (Egypt)	0–0	(Egypt) Tala'ea El Gaish	Cairo
		Report		Stadium: Al Salam Stadium

5 October 2022 Friendly	Ismaily (Egypt)	2–0	(Egypt) Tala'ea El Gaish	Ismailia
	Morsi; Chaouat	Report		Stadium: Ismailia Stadium

11 October 2022 Friendly	Tala'ea El Gaish (Egypt)	1–2	(Egypt) Al Mokawloon Al Arab
	Goal		Kabore; Niass

18 November 2022 Friendly	Tala'ea El Gaish (Egypt)	2–0	(Egypt) Al Ittihad	Cairo
	Tarek; El Sharkawy

21 November 2022 Friendly	Tala'ea El Gaish (Egypt)	0–0	(Egypt) Ceramica Cleopatra	Cairo
		Report		Stadium: Gehaz El Reyada Stadium

== Competitions ==
=== Overview ===
Competition	First match	Last match	Starting round	Final position	Record							
Competition	First match	Last match	Starting round	Final position	Pld	W	D	L	GF	GA	GD	Win %
Egyptian Premier League	20 October 2022	14 July 2023	Matchday 1	14th	34	8	12	14	33	45	−12	23.53
Egypt Cup	11 May 2023	23 June 2023	Round of 32	Round of 16	2	1	1	0	4	1	+3	50.00
EFA Cup	25 March 2023		Round of 16	Round of 16	1	0	1	0	0	0	+0	0.00
Arab Club Champions Cup	4 April 2023	11 April 2023	First qualifying round	First qualifying round	2	0	1	1	2	3	−1	0.00
Total					39	9	15	15	39	49	−10	23.08

Source: Soccerway

=== Egyptian Premier League ===
==== League table ====
Pos	Team	Pld	W	D	L	GF	GA	GD	Pts	Qualification or relegation
12	National Bank of Egypt	34	9	12	13	35	40	−5	39	
13	Ceramica Cleopatra	34	7	16	11	31	32	−1	37	
14	Tala'ea El Gaish	34	8	12	14	33	45	−12	36	
15	El Dakhleya	34	7	14	13	32	43	−11	35	
16	Aswan (R)	34	8	9	17	31	45	−14	33 (Note: Tied on head-to-head points (3) and on head-to-head goal difference (0). Overall goal difference: Aswan −14, Ghazl El Mahalla −21.)	Relegation to Second Division A

Source: Soccerway
Rules for classification: 1) Points; 2) Head-to-head points; 3) Head-to-head goal difference; 4) Goal difference; 5) Goals scored; 6) Play-off.
(R) Relegated

==== Results summary ====
Overall								Home						Away					
Pld	W	D	L	GF	GA	GD	Pts	W	D	L	GF	GA	GD	W	D	L	GF	GA	GD
24	4	9	11	22	33	−11	21	4	3	5	14	17	−3	0	6	6	8	16	−8

Last updated: 26 April 2023.
Source: worldfootball

==== Results by round ====
Round	1	2	3	4	5	6	7	8	9	10	11	12	13	14	15	16	17	18	19	20	21	22	23	24	25	26	27
Ground	A	H	A	H	A	H	A	H	A	H	A	H	A	H	A	A	H	H	A	H	A	H	A	H	A	H	A
Result	D	W	L	W	L	L	L	W	D	D	D	L	L	D	D	D	L	L	D	L	L	P	P	W	L	D	P
Position	12	6	8	6	8	10	12	9	10	10	11	11	13	12	12	13	13	13	13	13	16						

Updated to match(es) played on 26 April 2023. Source: worldfootball
A = Away; H = Home; W = Win; D = Draw; L = Loss

==== Matches ====
The league fixtures were announced on 9 October 2022.

20 October 2022 1	El Dakhleya	0–0	Tala'ea El Gaish	Cairo
19:00 EST (UTC+2)		Report		Stadium: Police Academy Stadium; Referee: Mahmoud Bassiouni

25 October 2022 2	Tala'ea El Gaish	2–1	ENPPI	Cairo
19:00 EST (UTC+2)	Kamar 15', 67'	Report	Kabou 13'	Stadium: Gehaz El Reyada Stadium; Referee: Youssouf Mohammed

31 October 2022 3	Al Ittihad	3–1	Tala'ea El Gaish	Alexandria
17:00 EST (UTC+2)	Mabululu 68'; Sobhy 79'; Attia 90'	Report	Tarek 25'	Stadium: Alexandria Stadium; Referee: Nader Kamar

2 December 2022 5	Al Ahly	2–1	Tala'ea El Gaish	Cairo
19:00 EST (UTC+2)	Radwan 53'; El Solia 66' (pen.)	Report	Meteb 25'	Stadium: Al Ahly WE Al Salam Stadium; Referee: Mohamed Adel

7 December 2022 6	Tala'ea El Gaish	0–4	Zamalek	Cairo
19:00 EST (UTC+2)		Report	Zizo 44', (penalty missed) 77'; Ashour 57'; Abou El Fotouh 83'; Osama 90+5'	Stadium: Police Academy Stadium; Referee: Ahmed El Ghandour

11 December 2022 4	Tala'ea El Gaish	3–1	Al Masry	Suez
17:00 EST (UTC+2)	Kamar 43'; Tarek 45+1'; Shehata 82'	Report	Grendo 61'	Stadium: Suez Stadium; Referee: Mahmoud Nagi

14 December 2022 7	Ghazl El Mahalla	3–2	Tala'ea El Gaish	El Mahalla El Kubra
14:45 EST (UTC+2)	El Henawy 45+1'; El Sheikh 70', 74'	Report	Samir 11' (pen.); Mohareb 37'	Stadium: Ghazl El Mahalla Stadium; Referee: Mohamed Al Ghazi

20 December 2022 8	Tala'ea El Gaish	1–0	National Bank	Cairo
17:00 EST (UTC+2)	Samir 33'	Report		Stadium: Gehaz El Reyada Stadium; Referee: Ibrahim Nour El Din

24 December 2022 9	Future	0–0	Tala'ea El Gaish	Cairo
19:00 EST (UTC+2)		Report		Stadium: Al Salam Stadium; Referee: Nader Kamar

28 December 2022 10	Tala'ea El Gaish	2–2	Haras El Hodoud	Cairo
17:00 EST (UTC+2)	Mohareb 52', 64'	Report	Meteb 4' (o.g.); Sobhi 11'; Gamal (penalty missed) 69'	Stadium: Gehaz El Reyada Stadium; Referee: Walid Abdelrazek

4 January 2023 11	Pharco	1–1	Tala'ea El Gaish	Alexandria
17:00 EST (UTC+2)	Hamroune 19' (pen.); Sokari (yellow card) 86'	Report	A. Samir 13'; M. Samir (yellow card) 17'	Stadium: Alexandria Stadium; Referee: Mostafa Othman

8 January 2023 12	Tala'ea El Gaish	1–2	Al Mokawloon Al Arab	Cairo
19:00 EST (UTC+2)	Mohareb (yellow card) 28'; Tarek (yellow card) 38', (goal) 67'; Halawa (yellow card) 90'; Samir (yellow card) 90+2'	Report	Alaa Eldin 4' (pen.); Okoli 66'	Stadium: Gehaz El Reyada Stadium; Referee: Ahmed Nasser

11 January 2023 13	Smouha	2–1	Tala'ea El Gaish	Alexandria
14:45 EST (UTC+2)	Hassan 25', 79'; Soliman (yellow card) 86'; Abd Rabo (yellow card) 90+5'	Report	Mansour 49'; Fathallah (yellow card) 68'	Stadium: Alexandria Stadium; Referee: Mahmoud Nassif

18 January 2023 14	Tala'ea El Gaish	1–1	Ismaily	Cairo
17:00 EST (UTC+2)	Tarek 4'; A. Samir (penalty missed) 79'; Osama (yellow card) 81'	Report	Madbouly (yellow card) 22'; Chaouat 45'; El Mohamady (yellow card) 77'	Stadium: Gehaz El Reyada Stadium; Referee: Ibrahim Nour El Din

23 January 2023 15	Ceramica Cleopatra	0–0	Tala'ea El Gaish	Cairo
19:00 EST (UTC+2)		Report	Shawky (yellow card) 48'	Stadium: Cairo International Stadium; Referee: Osama Ismail

27 January 2023 16	Aswan	2–2	Tala'ea El Gaish	Aswan
14:45 EST (UTC+2)	Ayagwa (yellow card) 17'; Zaki 22'; Belhadji 59'; Kamone (yellow card) 79'; Salah (yellow card) 90+10'	Report	Wadi 45+4' (pen.); Gaber 46'; Diab (yellow card) 81'; Shaaban (yellow card) 90+3'; Ayman (yellow card) 90+10'	Stadium: Aswan Stadium; Referee: Mohamed Salama

7 February 2023 17	Tala'ea El Gaish	0–1	Pyramids	Cairo
17:00 EST (UTC+2)		Report	Ben Youssef 45+2'	Stadium: Gehaz El Reyada Stadium; Referee: Mohamed Adel

11 February 2023 18	Tala'ea El Gaish	0–1	El Dakhleya	Cairo
19:00 EST (UTC+2)		Report	El Zahdi 51'	Stadium: Gehaz El Reyada Stadium; Referee: Mostafa Osman

20 February 2023 19	ENPPI	0–0	Tala'ea El Gaish	Cairo
19:00 EST (UTC+2)		Report		Referee: Mahmoud Ashour

27 February 2023 20	Tala'ea El Gaish	3–4	Al Ittihad	Cairo
19:00 EST (UTC+2)	Tarek 27'; Wadi 64'; Mohareb 78'	Report	Mabululu 13', 35' (pen.), 45'; El Ghandour 74'	Stadium: Gehaz El Reyada Stadium; Referee: Amin Omar

6 March 2023 21	Al Masry	1–0	Tala'ea El Gaish	Borg El Arab
17:00 EST (UTC+2)	Yehia 64'	Report		Stadium: Borg El Arab Stadium; Referee: Abdel Kader Yehia

15 April 2023 25	National Bank	2–0	Tala'ea El Gaish	Cairo
21:15 EST (UTC+2)	Stouhi 25' (o.g.); Faisal 51'	Report		Stadium: Cairo International Stadium; Referee: Abdelaziz El Sayed

19 April 2023 26	Tala'ea El Gaish	0–0	Future	Cairo
21:15 EST (UTC+2)		Report		Stadium: Gehaz El Reyada Stadium; Referee: Mahmoud Nagi

26 April 2023 24	Tala'ea El Gaish	1–0	Ghazl El Mahalla	Cairo
17:00 EST (UTC+2)	Joules 6'	Report		Stadium: Gehaz El Reyada Stadium; Referee: Ahmed Ghandour

4 May 2023 27	Haras El Hodoud	2–3	Tala'ea El Gaish	Alexandria
19:00 EST (UTC+3)	David 6'; Ziko 15' (pen.)	Report	Tarek 48'; Wadi 78'; Abdel Rahman 90+5'	Stadium: Haras El Hodoud Stadium; Referee: Mahmoud Ashour
Note: The game, which was initially slated for 24 April 2023, was postponed.

16 May 2023 28	Tala'ea El Gaish	2–2	Pharco	Cairo
21:30 EST (UTC+3)	Joules 2'; Fathallah 67'	Report	Bakri 33'; Gamal 90+3'	Stadium: Gehaz El Reyada Stadium; Referee: Mahmoud Nagi

22 May 2023 29	Al Mokawloon Al Arab	0–0	Tala'ea El Gaish	Cairo
21:30 EST (UTC+3)		Report		Stadium: Osman Ahmed Osman Stadium; Referee: Mohamed Al Kalawy

26 May 2023 22	Tala'ea El Gaish	0–2	Al Ahly	Cairo
20:00 EST (UTC+2)		Report	Afsha 46'; El Soleya 90+1' (pen.)	Stadium: Cairo Military Academy Stadium; Referee: Mahmoud El Banna

30 May 2023 23	Zamalek	2–0	Tala'ea El Gaish	Cairo
20:00 EST (UTC+3)	Abdul-Majeed 88'; Ndiaye 90+2'	Report		Stadium: Cairo International Stadium; Referee: Mohamed El Hanafi
Note: The game, which was initially slated for 4 April 2023, was postponed due to Tala'ea El Gaish participation in the Arab Club Champions Cup.

3 June 2023 30	Tala'ea El Gaish	2–0	Smouha	Cairo
20:00 EST (UTC+2)	Stouhi 18'; Wadi 45'	Report	Ougola (penalty missed) 85'	Stadium: Gehaz El Reyada Stadium; Referee: Hisham Al-Falal

=== Egypt Cup ===
11 May 2023 Round of 32	Tala'ea El Gaish	3–0	El Sharkia	Cairo
19:00 EST (UTC+3)				Stadium: Gehaz El Reyada Stadium

23 June 2023 Round of 16	Tala'ea El Gaish	1–1 (a.e.t.) (7–8 p)	National Bank	Cairo
18:30 EST (UTC+3)	Tarek 10'		Yasser 89'	Stadium: Gehaz El Reyada Stadium; Referee: Sobhy El Amrawy
	Penalties
	Wadi (penalty scored); Sherif (penalty missed); Mohareb (penalty missed); Halawa (penalty scored); Meteb (penalty scored); Stouhi (penalty scored); Fathallah (penalty scored); Hamdy (penalty scored); Radwan (penalty scored); Wadi (penalty missed)		(penalty missed) Simporé; (penalty scored) Bambo; (penalty scored) Bassiouny; (penalty missed) El Sayed; (penalty scored) Helal; (penalty scored) El Gazzar; (penalty scored) Fathy; (penalty scored) Yakubu; (penalty scored) Abou Gabal; (penalty scored) Helal

=== EFA Cup ===
25 March 2023 Round of 16	Future	0–0 (3–1 p)	Tala'ea El Gaish	Cairo
21:15 EST (UTC+2)				Stadium: Petrosport Stadium

=== Arab Club Champions Cup ===
==== Qualifying rounds ====
4 April 2023 First leg	Tala'ea El Gaish (Egypt)	1–2	(Libya) Al Ahli Tripoli	Cairo
21:00 UTC+2	Tarek 21'	Report	El Monir 54'; Maatouk 89'	Stadium: Gehaz El Reyada Stadium; Referee: Adham Makhadmeh (Jordan)

11 April 2023 Second leg	Al Ahli Tripoli (Libya)	1–1 (3–2 agg.)	(Egypt) Tala'ea El Gaish	Benghazi, Libya
21:00 UTC+2	Salto 64'	Report	Julius 20'	Stadium: Martyrs of February Stadium; Referee: Mahmood Ali Ismail (Sudan)
