= 2020 Egypt Cup final =

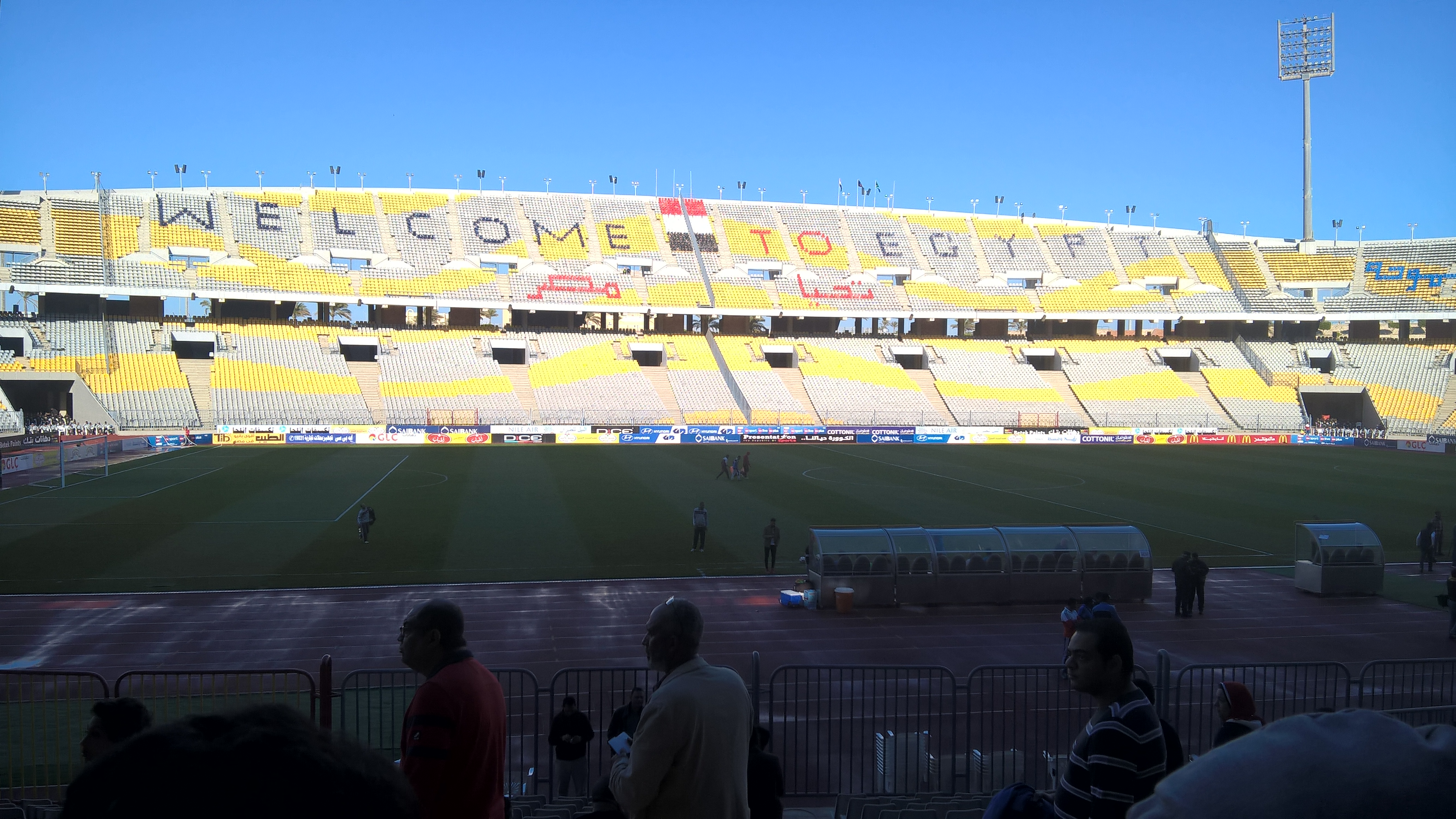
- Borg El Arab Stadium hosted the final
- Event: 2019–20 Egypt Cup
Al Ahly	Tala'ea El Gaish
1	1
- After extra time Al Ahly won 3–2 on penalties
- Date: 5 December 2020
- Venue: Borg El Arab Stadium, Alexandria
- Referee: Mohamed El Hanafy
- Weather: Fair; 15 °C (59 °F); 88% humidity

The 2020 Egypt Cup final was the 88th Egypt Cup Final, the final match of the 2019–20 Egypt Cup, Africa's oldest football cup competition. It was played at Borg El Arab Stadium in Alexandria, Egypt, on 5 December 2020 between Al Ahly and Tala'ea El Gaish.

Al Ahly won the match 3–2 on penalties, after the original and extra time ended 1–1, winning their 37th Egypt Cup title. Since Al Ahly also won the 2019–20 Egyptian Premier League, Tala'ea El Gaish earned the right to play in the 2020–21 Egyptian Super Cup as the Egypt Cup runners-up.

Since the competition wouldn't finish by the CAF deadline (1 November 2020) for associations to submit participating teams in African competitions for the 2020–21 season, the spot awarded to the Egypt Cup winners (Confederation Cup preliminary or first round) was passed to the fourth-placed team in the 2019–20 Egyptian Premier League, Al Mokawloon Al Arab.

== Route to the final ==
In all results below, the score of the finalist is given first. From the round of 16, all matches were played on neutral grounds.

=== Al Ahly ===
Round	Opposition	Score
R32	Beni Suef	3–1
R16	Tersana	2–1
QF	Abou Qir Fertilizers	2–1
SF	Al Ittihad	2–1

As an Egyptian Premier League club, Al Ahly started in the round of 32 where they were drawn with Egyptian Second Division team Beni Suef. Al Ahly won 3–1 with two goals from Walid Azaro and one from Ahmed El Sheikh. In the round of 16, they were drawn against Egyptian Second Division team Tersana and won 2–1 thanks to a brace from Junior Ajayi. In the quarter-finals, they were drawn against another Egyptian Second Division side, Abou Qir Fertilizers, and won 2–1 with both goals coming from Walid Soliman in the first half of the match. In the semi-finals, they were drawn with an Egyptian Premier League side for the first time this season, against Al Ittihad and progressed to the final after a controversial 2–1 win with Mohamed Magdy and Hamdy Fathy on the scoresheet. After the match, Al Ittihad filed a complaint against the match referee Mohamed Maarouf for his poor decisions made during the game, especially before Al Ahly's second goal, that "helped" them to win the game. Numerous former referees and analysts supported the move made by the club, including ON Time Sports' analyst Ahmed El Shenway, who said that errors made by Maarouf and the VAR referees prevented Al Ittihad from advancing to the final.

=== Tala'ea El Gaish ===
Round	Opposition	Score
R32	Dikernis	1–0
R16	Misr Lel Makkasa	1–0
QF	Pyramids	0–0 (a.e.t.) (3–1 pen.)
SF	Zamalek	3–1 (a.e.t.)

As an Egyptian Premier League club, Tala'ea El Gaish also started in the round of 32. They were drawn at home against Egyptian Second Division side Dikernis. Tale'ea El Gaish won 1–0 with a goal from Hossam Salama. In the round of 16, they drew fellow Egyptian Premier League team Misr Lel Makkasa and won 1–0 thanks to a goal from Misr Lel Makkasa's loanee Kevin Muhire. In the quarter finals, they played against fellow Egyptian Premier League side Pyramids and won 3–1 on penalties after the match ended goalless after extra time, with Mohamed Ashraf, Ahmed Kabouria and Ali El Fil scoring all three penalties. In the semi-finals, they were drawn against Egyptian Premier League side and Egypt Cup defending champions Zamalek and progressed to the final after a 3–1 extra time win with two goals from Ahmed Samir and one from new signing Amr Marey.

== Before the match ==
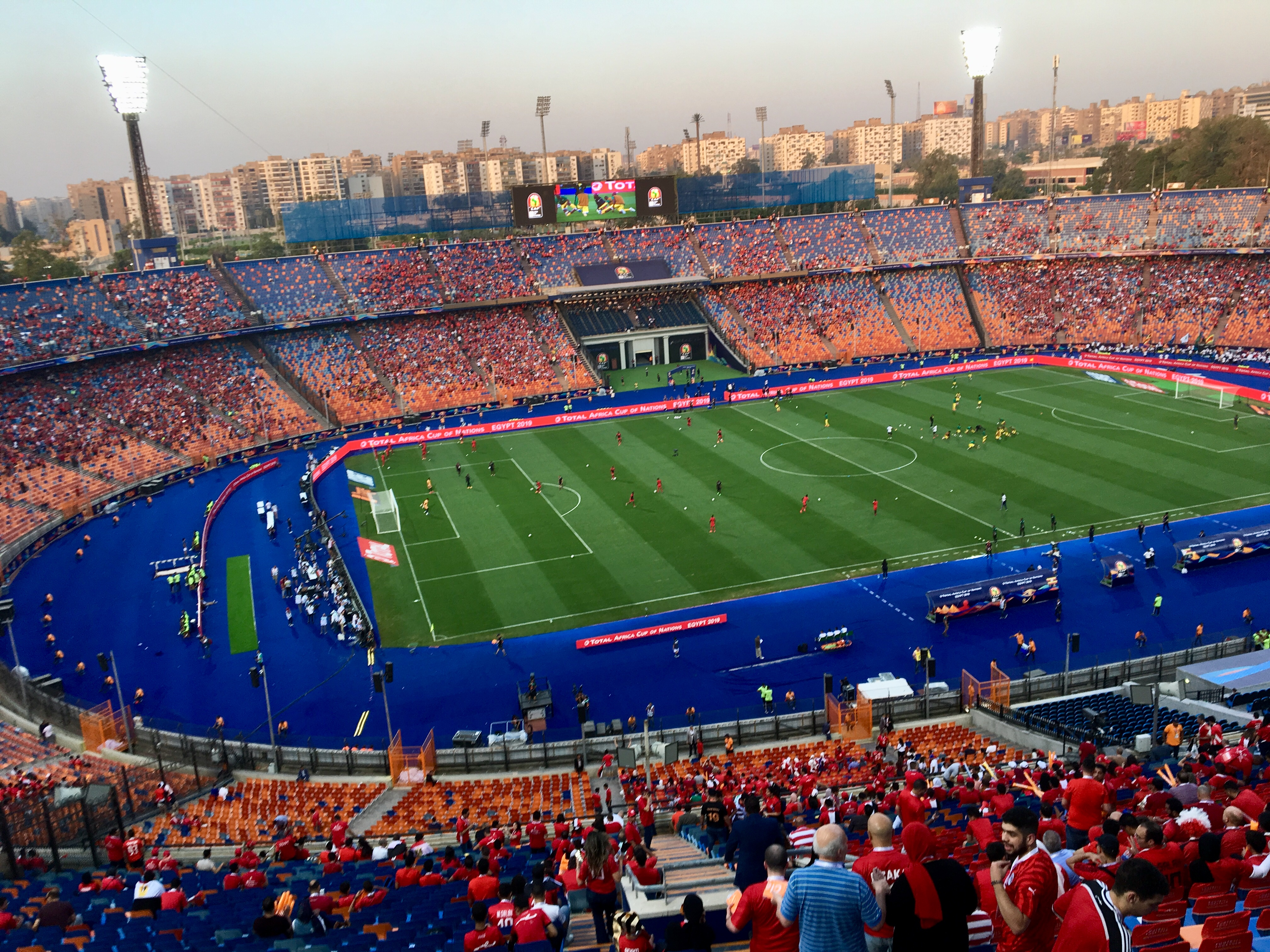
The Cairo International Stadium in Cairo was initially chosen to host the final.

Al Ahly reached the final for the first time since 2017 and for the 42nd time in their history, extending their record for finals appearances. Tala'ea El Gaish qualified to the Egypt Cup final this season for the first time in the club's history.

The match was originally scheduled to be played in the Cairo International Stadium in Cairo, but was later moved to Borg El Arab Stadium in Alexandria after the former was selected to host the CAF Super Cup.

The Egyptian Football Association confirmed that the match would be played behind closed doors due to the COVID-19 pandemic.

== Match ==
=== Officials ===
On 4 December 2020, EFA named Mohamed El Hanafy as the referee for the match. El Hanafy is considered as one of Egypt's finest referees and appeared in numerous matches in the Egyptian Premier League and the Egyptian Second Division during the recent seasons. Ahmed Hossam and Youssef El Bosaty were chosen as the assistant referees, while Mohamed El Sabahy was chosen as the fourth official. Tarek Magdy was named the video assistant referee and was assisted by Mahmoud Ashour.

=== Details ===
5 December 2020
20:00 CAT

Al Ahly	1–1 (a.e.t.)	Tala'ea El Gaish
Kahraba 65'	Report	Mansi 90+2'
Penalties
Maâloul (penalty scored); El Solia (penalty scored); Benoun (penalty scored); Ashraf (penalty missed); Afsha (penalty missed)	3–2	(penalty scored) Mohareb; (penalty missed) Mansi; (penalty missed) Sotohi; (penalty scored) M. Gamal; (penalty missed) El Sayed

Borg El Arab Stadium, Alexandria
Referee: Mohamed El Hanafy

Al Ahly	Tala'ea El Gaish

GK	16	(Egypt) Mohamed El Shenawy (c)
RB	30	(Egypt) Mohamed Hany
CB	3	(Morocco) Badr Benoun
CB	12	(Egypt) Ayman Ashraf	(yellow card) 50'
LB	21	(Tunisia) Ali Maâloul
CM	17	(Egypt) Amr El Solia
CM	8	(Egypt) Hamdy Fathy		(substituted off) 110'
RW	14	(Egypt) Hussein El Shahat		(substituted off) 83'
AM	19	(Egypt) Mohamed "Afsha" Magdy
LW	27	(Egypt) Taher Mohamed		(substituted off) 62'
CF	9	(Egypt) Marwan Mohsen		(substituted off) 110'
Substitutes:
GK	13	(Egypt) Ali Lotfi
DF	5	(Egypt) Ramy Rabia
DF	6	(Egypt) Yasser Ibrahim
DF	23	(Egypt) Mahmoud Wahid
MF	22	(Egypt) Nasser Maher		(substituted on) 110'
MF	25	(Egypt) Akram Tawfik		(substituted on) 83'
FW	7	(Egypt) Mahmoud Kahraba	(yellow card) 71'	(substituted on) 62'
FW	18	(Egypt) Salah Mohsen		(substituted on) 110'
FW	29	(Angola) Geraldo
Manager:
(South Africa) Pitso Mosimane

GK	18	(Egypt) Mohamed Bassam (c)
RB	6	(Egypt) Khaled Sotohi
CB	5	(Egypt) Ali El Fil
CB	27	(Egypt) Ahmed Alaa	(yellow card) 89' (yellow-red card) 90+6'
LB	21	(Egypt) Mohamed Nasef	(yellow card) 84'	(substituted off) 86'
RM	19	(Egypt) Ahmed Samir		(substituted off) 62'
CM	22	(Egypt) Mohanad Lasheen		(substituted off) 82'
CM	25	(Gabon) Franck Engonga		(substituted off) 82'
LM	24	(Egypt) Ahmed Abdel Rahman
CF	13	(Egypt) Amr Marey		(substituted off) 62'
CF	17	(Egypt) Amr Gamal		(substituted off) 91'
Substitutes:
GK	1	(Egypt) Mohamed Shaaban
DF	20	(Egypt) Hussein El Sayed		(substituted on) 86'
DF	26	(Egypt) Ahmed Hany
MF	7	(Egypt) Amr El Sisi		(substituted on) 82'
MF	14	(Egypt) Mostafa Gamal		(substituted on) 82'
MF	35	(Egypt) Mostafa El Zenary		(substituted on) 91'
FW	9	(Egypt) Nasser Mansi	(yellow card) 90+3'	(substituted on) 62'
FW	11	(Portugal) Toni Gomes
FW	12	(Egypt) Islam Mohareb		(substituted on) 62'
Manager:
(Egypt) Tarek El Ashry

Assistant referees:
Ahmed Hossam
Youssef El Bosaty
Fourth official:
Mohamed El Sabahy
Video assistant referee:
Tarek Magdy
Assistant video assistant referee:
Mahmoud Ashour

Match rules

- 90 minutes
- 30 minutes of extra time if necessary
- Penalty shoot-out if scores still level
- Nine named substitutes
- Maximum of five substitutions, with a sixth allowed in extra time (Note: Each team was only given three opportunities to make substitutions, with a fourth opportunity in extra time, excluding substitutions made at half-time, before the start of extra time and at half-time in extra time.)
