= 2023–24 Al Mokawloon Al Arab SC season =

Al Mokawloon Al Arab SC
2023–24 season
- Manager: Shawky Gharieb (until 9 December); Talaat Moharam (from 9 December to 16 January); Mohamed Ouda (from 16 January to 21 April); Motamed Gamal (from 22 April)
- Stadium: Osman Ahmed Osman Stadium
- Egyptian Premier League: 17th (relegated)
- Egypt Cup: Round of 32
- Egyptian League Cup: Group stage

The 2023–24 Al Mokawloon Al Arab SC season was the club's 51st season in existence and the 19th consecutive season in the top flight of Egyptian football. In addition to the domestic league, Al Mokawloon Al Arab participated in this season's editions of the Egypt Cup, and the League Cup.

On 13 August 2024, Al Mokawloon Al Arab were relegated after a 1–1 draw with Ismaily, ending their uninterrupted top-flight presence since the 2005–06 season.

== Players ==
=== First-team squad ===
As of 20 September 2023

Note: Flags indicate national team as defined under FIFA eligibility rules; some limited exceptions apply. Players may hold more than one non-FIFA nationality.

No.	Pos.	Nation	Player
1	GK	EGY	Mahmoud Abu El Saoud
16	GK	EGY	Amer Amer
2	DF	EGY	Amir Abed
3	DF	ALG	Imadeddine Boubekeur
5	DF	EGY	Louay Wael
13	DF	EGY	Mohamed Hany Hazien
20	DF	EGY	Ahmed Alaa Eldin
22	DF	EGY	Mohamed Shawky Gharib
23	DF	UGA	Joseph Ochaya
26	DF	EGY	Ahmed Eid
4	MF	EGY	Ahmed El Sheimy
6	MF	EGY	Arabi Badr
8	MF	EGY	Ahmed Fawzy
12	MF	EGY	Islam Abdulnaim

No.	Pos.	Nation	Player
14	MF	EGY	Abdulrahman Khaled
17	MF	EGY	El Habib Ahmed Bebo
19	MF	EGY	Mohamed Megali
27	MF	EGY	Ammar Hamdy
7	FW	MTN	Amadou Niass
9	FW	EGY	Mohamed Salem
11	FW	EGY	Emad Mayhob
15	FW	EGY	Amr Marey
25	FW	EGY	Ziad Farag
29	FW	PLE	Mahmoud Wadi

== Transfers ==
=== In ===
Pos.	Player	Transferred from	Fee	Date	Source
FW	(Egypt) Amr Marey	(Egypt) ENPPI	Free	15 August 2023	
FW	(Egypt) Zyad Farag	(Egypt) Al Masry	Loan	16 August 2023	
MF	(Egypt) Ahmed Fawzi	(Egypt) Pyramids	Loan	16 August 2023	
MF	(Egypt) Emad Mayhoub	(Egypt) Pyramids	Loan	16 August 2023	
FW	(Palestine) Mahmoud Wadi	(Egypt) Pyramids	Free	19 August 2023	
DF	(Algeria) Imadeddine Boubekeur	(Egypt) Al Masry	Free	28 August 2023	
MF	(Egypt) Ammar Hamdy	(Egypt) Al Ahly	€90,000	4 September 2023	

=== Out ===
Pos.	Player	Transferred to	Fee	Date	Source
GK	(Egypt) Hassan Shaheen	National Bank of Egypt	Free	5 August 2023	
MF	(Egypt) Youssef El Gohary	(Egypt) Al Masry		14 August 2023	

== Pre-season and friendlies ==
Win Draw Loss Fixtures

4 September 2023 Friendly	Al Mokawloon (Egypt)	0–0	(Egypt) Baladiyat El Mahalla	Ain Sokhna

6 September 2023 Friendly	Al Mokawloon (Egypt)	0–0	(Egypt) Wadi Degla	Ain Sokhna
		Report

10 September 2023 Friendly	Al Mokawloon (Egypt)	1–0	(Libya) Al-Ahly	Cairo
	Salem	Report		Stadium: Osman Ahmed Osman Stadium

== Competitions ==
=== Overall record ===
Competition	First match	Last match	Starting round	Final position	Record							
Competition	First match	Last match	Starting round	Final position	Pld	W	D	L	GF	GA	GD	Win %
Egyptian Premier League	20 September 2023	18 August 2024	Matchday 1	17th	34	5	11	18	32	57	−25	14.71
Egypt Cup	29 May 2024		Round of 32	Round of 32	1	0	0	1	0	1	−1	0.00
Egyptian League Cup	9 January 2024	26 January 2024	Group stage	Group stage	3	0	1	2	1	3	−2	0.00
Total					38	5	12	21	33	61	−28	13.16

Source: Competitions

=== Egyptian Premier League ===
==== League table ====
Pos	Team	Pld	W	D	L	GF	GA	GD	Pts	Qualification or relegation
14	Ismaily	34	7	12	15	33	43	−10	33 (Note: Tied on head-to-head points (3). Head-to-head goal difference: Ismaily +1, Pharco –1.)	
15	Pharco	34	6	15	13	32	43	−11	33	
16	Baladiyat El Mahalla (R)	34	7	7	20	31	65	−34	28	Relegation to Second Division A
17	Al Mokawloon Al Arab (R)	34	5	11	18	32	57	−25	26	Relegation to Second Division A
18	El Dakhleya (R)	34	3	11	20	17	43	−26	20	Relegation to Second Division A

Source: Soccerway
Rules for classification: 1) Points; 2) Head-to-head points; 3) Head-to-head goal difference; 4) Goal difference; 5) Goals scored; 6) Play-off tie.
(Note: Head-to-head records are used for final standings only)
(R) Relegated

==== Results summary ====
Overall								Home						Away					
Pld	W	D	L	GF	GA	GD	Pts	W	D	L	GF	GA	GD	W	D	L	GF	GA	GD
34	5	11	18	32	57	−25	26	2	5	10	14	25	−11	3	6	8	18	32	−14

Source: Worldfootball

==== Results by round ====
Round	1	2
Ground	H	
Result	L	
Position	15	

Source: Worldfootball
A = Away; H = Home; W = Win; D = Draw; L = Loss; P = Postponed

==== Matches ====
The league fixtures were unveiled on 11 September 2023.

20 September 2023 1	Al Mokawloon Al Arab	0–2	Baladiyat El Mahalla

25 September 2023 2	Zamalek	1–1	Al Mokawloon Al Arab

5 October 2023 3	Smouha	2–1	Al Mokawloon Al Arab

22 October 2023 4	Al Mokawloon Al Arab	3–3	ZED

28 October 2023 5	Al Ittihad	3–2	Al Mokawloon Al Arab

4 November 2023 6	Al Mokawloon Al Arab	1–2	Al Ahly

30 November 2023 7	Pharco	1–1	Al Mokawloon Al Arab

6 December 2023 8	Al Mokawloon Al Arab	0–0	El Dakhleya

15 December 2023 9	Tala'ea El Gaish	1–2	Al Mokawloon Al Arab

30 December 2023 11	National Bank	3–1	Al Mokawloon Al Arab

14 February 2024 12	Al Mokawloon Al Arab	0–1	ENPPI

19 February 2024 13	Modern Future	2–2	Al Mokawloon Al Arab

26 February 2024 14	Al Mokawloon Al Arab	0–1	Al Masry

1 March 2024 15	Ceramica Cleopatra	2–0	Al Mokawloon Al Arab

9 March 2024 16	Al Mokawloon Al Arab	1–1	Ismaily

3 April 2024 17	El Gouna	1–2	Al Mokawloon Al Arab

15 April 2024 10	Al Mokawloon Al Arab	0–2	Pyramids

19 April 2024 18	Baladiyat El Mahalla	2–0	Al Mokawloon Al Arab

28 April 2024 20	Al Mokawloon Al Arab	0–1	Smouha

3 May 2024 21	ZED	0–1	Al Mokawloon Al Arab

11 May 2024 22	Al Mokawloon Al Arab	0–1	Al Ittihad

20 May 2024 24	Al Mokawloon Al Arab	1–1	Pharco

25 May 2024 25	El Dakhleya	3–0	Al Mokawloon Al Arab

16 June 2024 26	Al Mokawloon Al Arab	3–1	Tala'ea El Gaish

23 June 2024 27	Pyramids	3–1	Al Mokawloon Al Arab

28 June 2024 28	Al Mokawloon Al Arab	1–4	National Bank

2 July 2024 29	ENPPI	2–2	Al Mokawloon Al Arab

11 July 2024 30	Al Mokawloon Al Arab	1–2	Modern Sport

21 July 2024 31	Al Masry	1–1	Al Mokawloon Al Arab

29 July 2024 19	Al Mokawloon Al Arab	2–1	Zamalek

1 August 2024 32	Al Mokawloon Al Arab	1–1	Ceramica Cleopatra

4 August 2024 23	Al Ahly	4–0	Al Mokawloon Al Arab

13 August 2024 33	Ismaily	1–1	Al Mokawloon Al Arab

18 August 2024 34	Al Mokawloon Al Arab	0–1	El Gouna

=== Egypt Cup ===
29 May 2024 Round of 32	Al Mokawloon Al Arab	0–1	Tersana	Cairo
17:00			Kesho 45'	Stadium: Osman Ahmed Osman Stadium; Referee: Ahmed Hamed

=== League Cup ===
9 January 2024	Al Masry	1–0	Al Mokawloon Al Arab	Alexandria
17:00	Moussa 14'	Report		Stadium: Borg El Arab Stadium; Referee: Mahmoud Nasef

15 January 2024	Al Mokawloon Al Arab	1–1	El Gouna	Cairo
15:00	Farag 62'	Report	Shousha 54' (pen.)	Stadium: Osman Ahmed Osman Stadium; Referee: Hamada El Qalawi

26 January 2024	Al Mokawloon Al Arab	0–1	National Bank of Egypt	Cairo
16:00		Report	Hassan 90+6'	Stadium: Osman Ahmed Osman Stadium; Referee: Tarek Magdy
