= Ali Ashour =

Ali Ashour may refer to:

- Ali Ashour (politician) (born 1960), Libyan politician
- Ali Ashour (football manager) (born 1971), Egyptian football manager
