= Shadi Ahdy =

Egyptian footballer (born 1993)

Personal information
- Full name: Shadi Ahdy Iskandar
- Date of birth: 27 July 1993 (age 33)
- Positions: Midfielder; forward

Senior career*
Years	Team	Apps	(Gls)
-2015	Wadi Degla SC	4	(0)
2012/2013	Lierse S.K.→(loan)	0	(0)
2014/2015	El Gouna FC→(loan)	0	(0)
2016/2017	Stuttgarter Kickers	0	(0)
2016/2017	FC Zimbru Chișinău	6	(0)
- * Club domestic league appearances and goals

Shadi Ahdy Iskandar (Arabic: شادي عهدي إسكندر; Russian: Шади Ахди; born 27 July 1993) is an Egyptian retired footballer.

== Career ==
Ahdy started his career with Wadi Degla SC, where his father was president, scoring 3 goals on his debut against Kahraba Talkha in the cup. He then helped Wadi Degla SC reach the 2012-13 Egypt Cup final before going on loan to Belgian second division side Lierse S.K., where he failed to make an appearance, before being sent on loan again, this time to El Gouna. After an unsuccessful trial with German Bundesliga side Hannover 96, Ahdy signed for Stuttgarter Kickers in the German lower leagues, where he again failed to make an appearance.

In 2016, he signed for Zimbru Chișinău, one of the most successful clubs in Moldova, becoming the first Egyptian to play in the country.

In 2013, he gained attention for joining the Egypt under-20 national team as a Christian.
