= Solomon Mensah =

Ghanaian association football player

Personal information
- Full name: Solomon Mensah
- Date of birth: 6 May 1997 (age 29)
- Place of birth: Accra, Ghana
- Height: 1.58 m (5 ft 2 in)
- Position: Midfielder

Youth career
- 2009–2010: Palmas FC
- 2010–2013: Prestige FC

Senior career*
Years	Team	Apps	(Gls)
2014–2015	Tema Youth	10	(2)
2015–2016	Bechem United	34	(5)
2016–2017	Fairpoint	8	(0)
2018–2020	Shabab Al Sahel	13	(0)
2020–2021	Aswan	14	(0)
2021–2022	Naft Maysan		
2022	Petrojet		
2022–2023	Al-Fahaheel		
- * Club domestic league appearances and goals as of 21:41, 30 June 2022 (UTC)

Solomon Mensah (born 6 May 1997) is a Ghanaian footballer who plays as a midfielder.

== Club career ==
Born in Accra, Mensah has played for Tema Youth, Bechem United, and Fairpoint. Solomon Mensah signed for Ghana Premier League club Bechem United at the beginning of the 2015 season.

Mensah joined Lebanese club Shabab Sahel in September 2018 on a one-year deal. At the end in January 2020, Mensah moved to Egyptian club Aswan SC in a deal until June 2022. He moved to Iraqi club Naft Maysan in 2021.

In January 2022, he moved to Petrojet. On 29 June 2022 he joined Kuwaiti club Al-Fahaheel.

== Honours ==
=== Club ===
Shabab Sahel

- Lebanese Elite Cup: 2019
