= 2017 Egypt Cup final =

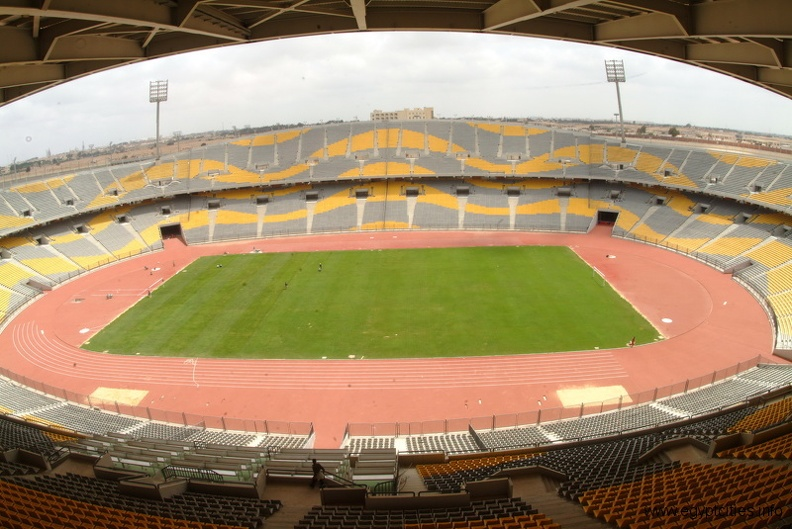
- Borg El Arab Stadium hosted the final
- Event: 2016–17 Egypt Cup
| Al Ahly | Al Masry |
| 2 | 1 |
- After extra time
- Date: 15 August 2017
- Venue: Borg El Arab Stadium, Alexandria
- Referee: Svein Oddvar Moen (Norway)
- Weather: Scattered clouds 27 °C (81 °F); 70% humidity

The 2017 Egypt Cup final was the 85th final of the Egypt Cup, Africa's oldest football cup competition. It was played on 15 August 2017 at Borg El Arab Stadium in Alexandria and was contested between Al Ahly and Al Masry. The winners would have entered the 2018 CAF Confederation Cup had they not already qualified. However, since Al Ahly already qualified for the 2018 CAF Champions League, the Confederation Cup entry went to Al Masry, as they reached the Cup final.

This was the 7th time the two teams meet each other in the final, having played before in 1927, 1945, 1947, 1983, 1984 and 1989.

The match was broadcast live in Egypt by dmc Sports, Nile Sport and ON Sport. All channels provided the free-to-air coverage.

== Details ==
15 August 2017
20:00 CAT

| Al Ahly | 2 x 1 (a.e.t.) | Al Masry |
|---|---|---|
| Amr Gamal 117'; Ahmed Fathy 120'+2' | Report | Bika 102' |

Borg El Arab Stadium, Alexandria
Referee: Svein Oddvar Moen (Norway)

| Al-Ahly | Al Masry |

| GK | 1 | (Egypt) Sherif Ekramy |
| CB | 3 | (Egypt) Ramy Rabia |
| CB | 23 | (Egypt) Mohamed Nagieb |
| RB | 24 | (Egypt) Ahmed Fathy |
| LB | 21 | (Tunisia) Ali Maâloul |
| CM | 25 | (Egypt) Hossam Ashour (c) | | (substituted off) 106' |
| CM | 17 | (Egypt) Amr El Solia |
| AM | 19 | (Egypt) Abdallah Said |
| RW | 11 | (Egypt) Walid Soliman | | (substituted off) 64' |
| LW | 8 | (Egypt) Moamen Zakaria | | (substituted off) 100' |
| CF | 28 | (Nigeria) Junior Ajayi | (yellow card) 68' |
Substitutes:
| GK | 13 | (Egypt) Ahmed Adel |
| DF | 30 | (Egypt) Mohamed Hany |
| MF | 14 | (Egypt) Hossam Ghaly |
| MF | 22 | (Egypt) Saleh Gomaa | | (substituted in) 68' |
| FW | 4 | (Egypt) Ahmed Hamoudi | | (substituted in) 100' |
| FW | 9 | (Egypt) Amr Gamal | | (substituted in) 106' |
| FW | 10 | (Egypt) Emad Moteab |
Manager:
(Egypt) Hossam El Badry

| GK | 26 | (Egypt) Ahmed Buska |
| CB | 3 | (Egypt) Islam Salah |
| CB | 13 | (Egypt) Ahmed Ayman (c) | | (substituted off) 52' |
| RB | 19 | (Egypt) Karim El Iraqy |
| LB | 45 | (Egypt) Mohamed Hamdy |
| CM | 8 | (Egypt) Amr Moussa |
| CM | 5 | (Egypt) Farid Shawky | (yellow card) 115' |
| AM | 18 | (Egypt) Mohamed El Shamy |
| RF | 10 | (Egypt) Ahmed Gomaa |
| CF | 29 | (Egypt) Hamada Nasser | | (substituted off) 90+1' |
| LF | 15 | (Egypt) Abdallah Gomaa |
Substitutes:
| GK | 1 | (Egypt) Ahmed Abdel Fattah |
| DF | 46 | (Egypt) Hossam Ashraf |
| DF | 24 | (Egypt) Islam Saleh |
| MF | 4 | (Egypt) Ahmed Kaboria | | (substituted in) 90+1' |
| MF | 14 | (Egypt) Abdallah Bika | (yellow card) 57' | (substituted in) 52' |
| FW | 20 | (Egypt) Ahmed Salem |
| FW | 37 | (Egypt) Hossam Attiya |
Manager:
(Egypt) Hossam Hassan

- Assistant referees:
- Magnus Lindberg (Norway)
- Kim Thomas (Norway)
- Fourth official:
- Badawy Hemida (Egypt)
