= Mohamed Halim =

Egyptian footballer

Personal information
- Date of birth: 2 January 1979 (age 47)
- Place of birth: Egypt
- Height: 1.75 m (5 ft 9 in)
- Position: Midfielder

Team information
- Current team: El Qanah (Manager)

Senior career*
Years	Team	Apps	(Gls)
2002–2015	Haras El Hodood	165	(17)

Managerial career
- 2015–2016: Haras El Hodoud (assistant)
- 2016–2017: El Sharkia (assistant)
- 2017–2020: Haras El Hodoud (assistant)
- 2020: Haras El Hodoud
- 2020–2021: Haras El Hodoud
- 2021–: El Qanah
- * Club domestic league appearances and goals

Mohamed Halim (Arabic: محمد حليم; born January 2, 1977) is an Egyptian retired football midfielder. He currently manages El Qanah in the Egyptian Second Division.

Halim has managed former club Haras El Hodoud SC on multiple occasions.

== Honours ==
- Egypt Cup: 2008–09, 2009–10
- Egyptian Super Cup: 2009

== Managerial statistics ==
As of 2 November 2022

Team	Nat	From	To	Record				
Team	Nat	From	To	G	W	D	L	Win %
Haras El Hodoud	(Egypt)	19 February 2020	15 September 2020	7	0	4	3	0.00
Haras El Hodoud	(Egypt)	9 October 2020	8 November 2021	3	1	0	2	33.33
El Qanah	(Egypt)	10 November 2021	Present	32	15	12	5	46.88
Total				42	16	16	10	38.10
