= Ali Ashour (politician) =

Libyan politician (born 1960)

Ali Ashour علي عاشور

Justice Minister
- Incumbent
- Assumed office 22 November 2011
- Prime Minister: Abdurrahim El-Keib

Personal details
- Born: 1960 (age 65–66) Khoms, Libya
- Party: Independent
- Education: University of Garyounis (B.A.); Azzaytuna University (M.A.)
- Profession: Chancellor; Politician

Ali Ihmayda Ashour Shaaban, M.A., (Arabic: علي حميدة عاشور; born 1960) is a judge and a Libyan politician. Born in the city of Khoms, he was named Justice Minister on 22 November 2011 by Abdurrahim El-Keib. Prior to the 2011 Libyan Civil War, Ali Ashour was a chancellor at Misrata Central Court.
