= Fairpoint F.C. =

- Full name: Fairpoint F.C.
- Ground: Ghana
- League: Division One League Zone 2B

Fairpoint F.C. is a Ghanaian professional football team that plays in the 2B Zone of the Ghana Division One League. Zone 2B has seven competing teams from the part of the Ashanti Region, Western Region and the Central Region of Ghana.
