= Reda Shehata =

Egyptian football manager (born 1981)

Personal information
- Full name: Reda Shehata El Sayed Abou El Naga
- Date of birth: 24 January 1981 (age 45)
- Place of birth: Egypt
- Height: 1.85 m (6 ft 1 in)
- Position: Midfielder

Senior career*
Years	Team	Apps	(Gls)
1999–2000	Mansoura	?	(?)
2000–2004	El Ahly	?	(?)
2004–2007	ENPPI		
2007–2008	→ Ittihad (loan)	5	(0)
2008–2011	El Gouna	36	(3)

International career
2002–2007	Egypt	3	(0)

Managerial career
- 2018–2019: El Gouna FC (General Manager)
- 2019–2019: El Gouna FC (Caretaker)
- 2019–2019: El Gouna FC (General Manager)
- 2019–2019: El Gouna FC (Caretaker)
- 2019–2020: El Gouna FC (General Manager)
- 2020–2022: El Gouna FC
- * Club domestic league appearances and goals as of February 1, 2011

Reda Shehata (born 24 January 1981 in Egypt) is an Egyptian football midfielder.

== Managerial statistics ==
As of match played 21 December 2020

Managerial record by team and tenure
Team	From	To	Record					Ref.
Team	From	To	P	W	D	L	Win %	Ref.
El Gouna FC	30 June 2019	9 July 2019	0	0	0	0	—	
El Gouna FC	10 December 2019	25 December 2019	3	2	0	1	66.7	
El Gouna	14 September 2020	""Present""	11	4	2	5	36.4	
Total			14	6	2	6	42.9	—
