= Karim Tarek =

Egyptian footballer (born 1992)

Personal information
- Full name: Karim Tarek Mohamed Safwat
- Date of birth: 23 January 1992 (age 34)
- Place of birth: Alexandria, Egypt
- Height: 1.73 m (5 ft 8 in)
- Positions: Winger; attacking midfielder

Team information
- Current team: Tala'ea El Gaish
- Number: 11

Youth career
- 2010–2013: ENPPI

Senior career*
Years	Team	Apps	(Gls)
2013–2014	ENPPI	0	(0)
2014–2015	El Gouna	30	(2)
2015–2019	Petrojet	73	(4)
2018–2019	→ Tala'ea El Gaish (loan)	29	(4)
2019–2020	Tala'ea El Gaish	27	(7)
2020–2021	ENPPI	25	(3)
2021–2022	El Gouna	33	(1)
2022–	Tala'ea El Gaish	79	(11)

International career
- Egypt U20
- Egypt U23
2019	Egypt	1	(0)
- * Club domestic league appearances and goals as of 11:02, 20 February 2026 (UTC)

Karim Tarek Mohamed Safwat (Arabic: كريم طارق محمد صفوت; born 23 January 1992), also known as Kareem Tarek, is an Egyptian professional footballer who plays for Egyptian Premier League club Tala'ea El Gaish. Operating mainly as a winger but also as an attacking midfielder, he is an ambipedal player.

== International career ==
Tarek made his debut for Egypt in a 1–0 friendly win over Liberia on 7 November 2019.
