= Mohamed Fathalla Difallah =

Egyptian long jumper

Mohamed Fathalla Difallah (born 26 August 1987 in Alexandria) is an Egyptian long jumper. He competed in the long jump event at the 2012 Summer Olympics.
