= Ali Ashour (football manager) =

Egyptian footballer, manager, and analyst

Personal information
- Full name: Ali Ashour
- Date of birth: 6 December 1971 (age 54)
- Place of birth: Egypt

Managerial career
- Years: Team
- 2013–2013: Al Ahli (Assist.)
- 2013–2013: Al Ahli
- 2013–2014: Al Ahli (Assist.)
- 2015–2017: Al Jazira U21
- 2020–2020: El Makkasa

Ali Ashour (Arabic: علي عاشور) is an Egyptian football manager.

== Career ==
Ashour managed Al Ahli in Libya. He was appointed as head coach of Misr Lel Makkasa SC from 22 September to 12 October 2020.

== Managerial statistics ==
As of match played 12 October 2020

Managerial record by team and tenure
Team	From	To	Record					Ref.
Team	From	To	P	W	D	L	Win %	Ref.
Al Ahli SC	30 October 2013	16 December 2013	3	1	2	0	33.3	
Al Jazira U21	1 August 2015	30 June 2017	52	24	11	17	46.2	
El Makkasa	22 September 2020	12 October 2020	4	1	0	3	25.0	
Total			59	26	13	20	44.1	—
