= Farid Shawky (footballer) =

Egyptian footballer (born 1989)

Personal information
- Full name: Farid Shawky
- Date of birth: 19 December 1989 (age 36)
- Place of birth: Egypt
- Position: Defensive midfielder

Team information
- Current team: Tala'ea El-Gaish SC
- Number: 5

Senior career*
| Years | Team | Apps | (Gls) |
| –2014 | Al Hammam | | |
| 2014–2016 | El Dakhleya | 66 | (1) |
| 2016–23 | Al Masry | 125 | (2) |
| 2023- | Tala'ea El-Gaish SC | 40 | (0) |
- * Club domestic league appearances and goals as of 16 August 2025 @ 15:19(AEST)

Farid Shawky (Egyptian Arabic: فريد شوقي; born 19 December 1989) is an Egyptian footballer who plays for Al Masry as a defensive midfielder.
