= Mahmoud Wadi =

Palestinian footballer

Personal information
- Date of birth: 19 December 1994 (age 31)
- Place of birth: Khan Yunis, Gaza, Palestine
- Height: 1.88 m (6 ft 2 in)
- Position: Striker

Senior career*
Years	Team	Apps	(Gls)
–2013	Shabab Maan		
2013–2015	Al-Ittihad Khan Yunis		
2015–2016	Ahli Al-Khaleel		
2016–2017	Al-Ittihad Khan Yunis		
2017–2018	Al-Ahli (Amman)	17	(10)
2018–2020	Al-Masry	53	(11)
2020–2024	Pyramids	28	(8)
2023	→ Tala'ea El Gaish (loan)	18	(4)
2023–2024	→ Al Mokawloon Al Arab SC (loan)	8	(0)
2024–2025	Asswehly	0	(0)
2025	Ghazl El Mahalla	2	(0)
2025–2026	Umm Salal	3	(0)

International career^{‡}
2017–	Palestine	21	(0)
- * Club domestic league appearances and goals as of 9 March 2026 ‡ National team caps and goals as of 14 June 2023

Mahmoud Wadi (Arabic: مَحْمُود وَادِي, born 19 December 1994) is a Palestinian footballer who plays as a striker for the Palestine national team. Wadi is nicknamed "the Tower" because of his tall stature and regular goals scored by his head.

== Club career ==
=== Al-Ahli ===
In August 2017, After impressing with Ahli Al-Khaleel in the 2016 AFC Cup Wadi moved to Amman via Egypt through the Rafah Border Crossing, to play football for Al-Ahli in the capital of Jordan. A year earlier Wadi was restricted from leaving Gaza to return to his club in the West Bank by Israeli authorities. During the 2017–18 Jordanian premier league season, Wadi scored 10 goals in 17 league games for the club.

=== Al-Masry ===
In June 2018, Wadi signed a two-year contract with 2017–18 Egyptian Premier League 3rd placed side Al-Masry, based in Port Said, after only one season in Jordan.

On 3 August 2018, Wadi made his debut for Al-Masry, coming off the bench to complete four minutes against El Gouna in a 1–0 victory.

=== Pyramids ===
On 11 November 2020, Pyramids announced the signing of Wadi on a four-year contract. Due to a lack of playing time, Wadi joined Tala'ea El Gaish on a loan agreement for the rest of the 2022–23 campaign. He made his first appearance in a 1–1 draw against Ismaily in the 65th minute as a substitute.

== International career ==
=== Palestine senior team ===
Wadi made his debut for the national team on 14 November 2017 against Maldives in the 2019 AFC Asian Cup qualification in Jenin, West Bank. Coming off the bench in the 50th minute, and winning the game 8–1.
