= Ahmed Masoud (footballer) =

Egyptian footballer (born 1991)

Personal information
- Full name: Ahmed Masoud Abdel Wahab Mohamed
- Date of birth: 15 December 1991 (age 34)
- Place of birth: Egypt
- Height: 1.89 m (6 ft 2 1/2 in)
- Position: Goalkeeper

Team information
- Current team: Al Masry
- Number: 1

Youth career
- Telephonat Beni Suef

Senior career*
Years	Team	Apps	(Gls)
2012–2014	Telephonat Beni Suef	21	(0)
2014–2015	Al Masry	16	(0)
2015–2018	Misr Lel Makkasa	44	(0)
2018–2022	Al Masry	105	(0)
2023	Tala'ea El Gaish	8	(0)
2023–	El Gouna	14	(0)
- * Club domestic league appearances and goals as of 18 August 2024

Ahmed Masoud (Arabic: أحمد مسعود; born 15 December 1991), is an Egyptian footballer who plays for Egyptian Premier League side El Gouna as a goalkeeper.
