= Mostafa Soltan =

Egyptian association football player (born 1992)

Personal information
- Full name: Mostafa Soltan
- Date of birth: 2 February 1992 (age 34)
- Place of birth: Mit Khaqan, El Monufia, Egypt
- Position: Winger

Team information
- Current team: Al Masry
- Number: 18

Youth career
- Al Ahly
- El Shams

Senior career*
Years	Team	Apps	(Gls)
2011–2015	El Shams		
2015–2020	FC Masr		
2020–	Al Masry	4	(0)
- * Club domestic league appearances and goals as of 7 January 2021

Mostafa Soltan (Arabic: مصطفى سلطان; born 2 February 1992), sometimes spelled Mostafa Sultan, is an Egyptian professional footballer who played as a winger for Egyptian Premier League club Al Masry. He currently has no club and is a free agent.
