= Amr Marey =

Egyptian footballer (born 1992)

Personal information
- Full name: Amr Marey Wahba Gad
- Date of birth: 1 January 1992 (age 34)
- Place of birth: El Mansoura, El Dakahlia, Egypt
- Height: 1.75 m (5 ft 9 in)
- Position: Forward

Team information
- Current team: Proxy

Youth career
- El Mansoura
- Wadi Degla

Senior career*
| Years | Team | Apps | (Gls) |
| 2012–2015 | Wadi Degla | 40 | (5) |
| 2015–2016 | El Dakhleya | 27 | (9) |
| 2016–2017 | ENPPI | 30 | (10) |
| 2017–2019 | Étoile Sportive du Sahel | 28 | (22) |
| 2019–2023 | Pyramids | 0 | (0) |
| 2019–2020 | → Misr Lel-Makkasa (loan) | 24 | (6) |
| 2020–2021 | → Tala'ea El Gaish (loan) | 23 | (2) |
| 2021–2023 | → Al Masry SC (loan) | 31 | (4) |
| 2023 | ENPPI SC | 3 | (0) |
| 2023–2024 | Al Mokawloon Al Arab SC | 15 | (0) |
| 2024–2025 | Al-Bateen | | |
| 2025 | Al-Jazeera | 10 | (1) |
| 2025– | Proxy | | |

International career^{‡}
| 2013– | Egypt | 2 | (0) |
- * Club domestic league appearances and goals as of 22:09, 18 October 2020 (UTC) ‡ National team caps and goals as of 17:24, 12 November 2017 (UTC)

Amr Marey (Arabic: عمرو مرعي; born 1 January 1992), also transliterated Mareï or Marie, is an Egyptian footballer who plays as a forward for Egyptian Second Division A club Proxy.

== Career ==
Marey started his career with El Mansoura, then he played for Wadi Degla, El Dakhleya and ENPPI, before joining Étoile du Sahel in Tunisia. In 2019, he returned to Egypt to join Pyramids, where he was loaned out to Misr Lel-Makkasa and Tala'ea El Gaish.

On 5 October 2024, Marey joined Saudi Third Division side Al-Bateen.
