= El Gouna FC =

Association football club in El Gouna, Egypt

El Gouna
- Full name: El Gouna Football Club
- Nickname: The Gounies
- Short name: GOU, GFC
- Founded: 2003; 23 years ago
- Ground: Khaled Bichara Stadium
- Capacity: 12,000
- Owner: Orascom Development Holding
- Chairman: Samih Sawiris
- Manager: Alaa Abdelaal
- League: Egyptian Premier League
- 2024–25: 11th

El Gouna Football Club (Arabic: نادي الجونة لكرة القدم) is an Egyptian football club based in the city of El Gouna, Egypt. The club currently plays in the Egyptian Premier League, the highest league in the Egyptian football league system.

== History ==
The club's first league season was in the Egyptian Fourth Division in 2003–04, where they achieved their first title and secured the promotion to the Egyptian Third Division. In the next season of the Third Division, 2004–05, El Gouna accomplished the same feat and promoted to the Egyptian Second Division. In the 2008–09 season of the Second Division the club managed to promote to the Egyptian Premier League for the first time in the club's history.

The team ended the 2017–18 campaign finishing top of the Egyptian Second Division (Group A) after their 1–0 away win against Al Salam on 11 April 2018. El Gouna will play in the Premier League for the fifth time in the club's history, having played four seasons in the top flight before with the 2014–15 season being the most recent.

In the 2022-23 season, El Gouna won promotion back to the Premier Division after one season.

== Records and statistics ==
Season	I	II	Pts.	Pl.	W	T	L	GS	GA	Diff.	Egypt Cup	Notes
2008–09		1 (Group A)	64 pts	30	18	10	2	54	17	+37	Round of 16	Promoted
2009–10	12		34 pts	30	8	10	12	26	32	−6	Round of 16	
2010–11	11		34 pts	30	8	10	12	26	33	−7	Quarter Final	
2011–12	not finished		22 pts	16	5	7	4	22	18	+4	not held	
2012–13	not finished		14 pts	15	3	5	7	12	19	-7	Runner-up	
2013–14	5 (Group 1)		26 pts	20	7	5	8	17	16	+1	Round of 32	
2014–15	16		46 pts	38	10	16	12	33	35	-2	Round of 16	Relegated
2015–16		4 (Group A)	33 pts	20	9	6	5	24	15	+9	5 Preliminary round	
2016–17		3 (Group A)	58 pts	32	16	10	6	48	31	+17	Round of 32	
2017–18		1 (Group A)	71 pts	30	21	8	1	63	22	+41	Round of 16	Promoted
2018–19	14		38 pts	34	8	14	12	38	52	-14	Round of 32	
2019–20	13		37 pts	34	10	7	17	32	45	-13	Round of 32	
2020–21	12		38 pts	34	8	14	12	36	41	-5	Round of 16	

== Players ==
=== Current squad ===
As of 10 February, 2025

Note: Flags indicate national team as defined under FIFA eligibility rules; some limited exceptions apply. Players may hold more than one non-FIFA nationality.

No.	Pos.	Nation	Player
1	GK	EGY	Ahmed Masoud
2	DF	EGY	Abdelgawad Taalab
3	DF	EGY	Khaled Ahmed (on loan from Enppi)
5	DF	EGY	Saber El Shimi
6	MF	GHA	Hafiz Ibrahim
7	FW	EGY	Ahmed Refaat (on loan from Wadi Degla)
8	MF	EGY	Reda Salah
9	FW	EGY	Marwan Mohsen
10	MF	EGY	Mohamed Mahmoud
11	FW	EGY	Ahmed Zaki (on loan from Enppi)
12	MF	EGY	Mahmoud Hassouna
13	MF	EGY	Omar El Gazar (on loan from Ceramica Cleopatra)
14	MF	EGY	Nour El Sayed (captain)
16	GK	EGY	Islam Reisha

No.	Pos.	Nation	Player
19	MF	EGY	Belal El Sayed
20	DF	EGY	Ahmed Belia
22	MF	EGY	Mohamed Reda
24	FW	EGY	Ali El Zahdi
25	DF	EGY	Abdallah El Said
26	GK	EGY	Ziad Askar
27	FW	EGY	Salah Zayed (on loan from Enppi)
29	FW	NGR	Samuel Ojo
30	MF	EGY	Mohamed Emad
33	MF	ZAM	David Simukonda (on loan from Ceramica Cleopatra)
34	DF	EGY	AMarwan Essam
36	MF	SLE	Alpha Turay
42	MF	CMR	Michael Egbemba
70	FW	EGY	Ahmed Gamal
90	MF	CMR	Wilfried Teukeu
99	GK	EGY	Badreldin Walid

=== Out on loan ===
Note: Flags indicate national team as defined under FIFA eligibility rules; some limited exceptions apply. Players may hold more than one non-FIFA nationality.

No. / Pos. / Nation / Player	No. / Pos. / Nation / Player

== Managers ==
- (Egypt) Ismail Youssef (1 November 2007 – 2 October 2010)
- (Egypt) Anwar Salama (10 October 2010 – 12 April 2013)
- (Germany) Rainer Zobel (12 April 2013 – 12 July 2015)
- (Germany) Stefan Florian Rieger (1 June 2016 – 31 December 2016)
- (Egypt) Hesham Zakareya (1 July 2017 – 27 November 2018)
- (Egypt) Hamada Sedki (28 November 2018 – 30 June 2019)
- (Egypt) Reda Shehata (30 June 2019 – 9 July 2019) (Caretaker)
- (Serbia) Nebojša Milošević (9 July 2019 – 10 December 2019)
- (Egypt) Reda Shehata (10 December 2019 – 25 December 2019) (Caretaker)
- (Portugal) Pedro Barny (27 December 2019 – 14 September 2020)
- (Egypt) Reda Shehata (14 September 2020 – Present)
