= 2022–23 Zamalek SC season =

Zamalek SC
2022–23 season
- Chairman: Mortada Mansour (until 25 February and from 30 March); Suleiman Wahdan (interim, from 25 February)
- Manager: Jesualdo Ferreira (until 24 January); Osama Nabieh (from 24 January until 1 February); Jesualdo Ferreira (from 1 February until 22 March); Ahmed Abdulmaqsoud (interim, from 22 March until 4 April); Medhat Abdel-Hady (interim, from 6 April); Juan Carlos Osorio (from 13 April)
- Stadium: Cairo International Stadium
- Egyptian Premier League: 3rd
- Egypt Cup: Runners-up
- EFA Cup: Round of 16
- CAF Champions League: Group stage
- Top goalscorer: League: Zizo (10); All: Zizo (16)
- Biggest win: Zamalek 5–1 Flambeau du Centre; Tala'ea El Gaish 0–4 Zamalek; Zamalek 4–0 Haras El Hodoud
- Biggest defeat: Zamalek 0–3 Al Ahly; Pharco 3–0 Zamalek; Zamalek 0–3 National Bank; Al Ahly 4–1 Zamalek
colours	Away colours	Third colours

The 2022–23 Zamalek SC season was the club's 112th season in existence and the 64th consecutive season in the top flight of Egyptian football. In addition to the domestic league, Zamalek participated in this season's editions of the Egypt Cup, the EFA Cup and the CAF Champions League.

== Overview ==
Zamalek had a strong start to the league, remaining undefeated until their tenth match. They opened with a 2-0 win against Smouha, then followed it up with another 2-0 victory over Ceramica Cleopatra. In the fifth round, they settled for a draw against ENPPI, and repeated this result in their game against Al-Masry. After that they achieved an impressive 4-0 clean sheet win over Vanguards of the Army and managed to clinch a 1-0 win in their postponed match versus Pyramids. The seventh round of the season saw Zamalek gain a significant victory against National Bank in the closing moments. To cap off the year, they remained undefeated in the league, coming away with a 3-1 win over Ismaily.

In the first game of the year, Zamalek was defeated surprisingly 2–1 by Aswan. This was only their second loss to the home team.

== Players ==
=== First-team squad ===
As of 13 January 2023

Note: Flags indicate national team as defined under FIFA eligibility rules; some limited exceptions apply. Players may hold more than one non-FIFA nationality.

No.	Pos.	Nation	Player
1	GK	EGY	Mohamed Awad
4	DF	EGY	Omar Gaber (3rd captain)
5	DF	EGY	Mohamed Abdel Ghani
6	DF	EGY	Mostafa El Zenary
7	FW	SEN	Ibrahima Ndiaye
8	MF	EGY	Emam Ashour
9	FW	BEN	Samson Akinyoola
10	FW	EGY	Shikabala (captain)
11	FW	EGY	Mostafa Shalaby
12	MF	EGY	Mohamed Ashraf
13	DF	EGY	Mohamed Abdel Shafy (vice-captain)
15	MF	EGY	Amr Alsisi
16	GK	EGY	Mohamed Sobhy
20	MF	EGY	Nabil Emad
22	DF	EGY	Abdallah Gomaa
24	DF	TUN	Hamza Al-Mathlouthi

No.	Pos.	Nation	Player
25	MF	EGY	Ahmed Mostafa
28	DF	EGY	Mahmoud Hamdy
29	DF	EGY	Ahmed Fatouh
30	FW	TUN	Seifeddine Al-Jaziri
31	MF	EGY	Mohamed Hossam Eldin
32	GK	EGY	El-Sayed Attia
33	FW	EGY	Hossam Ashraf
34	GK	EGY	Mohamed Nadim
35	FW	EGY	Youssef Hassan
36	DF	EGY	Hossam Abdul-Majeed
37	FW	EGY	Youssef Osama
38	DF	EGY	Muhammad Tarek
39	MF	EGY	Sayed Abduallah
40	MF	EGY	Seif Farouk
41	MF	EGY	Mohamed Khoudary

=== Out on loan ===
Note: Flags indicate national team as defined under FIFA eligibility rules; some limited exceptions apply. Players may hold more than one non-FIFA nationality.

No.	Pos.	Nation	Player
—	GK	EGY	Ahmed Nader (on loan to F.C. Vizela)
—	MF	EGY	Hamdy Alaa (on loan to National Bank of Egypt SC)
—	FW	EGY	Osama Faisal (on loan to National Bank of Egypt SC)
—	DF	EGY	Ahmed Ayman Mansour (on loan to Tala'ea El Gaish SC)
—	DF	EGY	Mahmoud Alaa (on loan to Al Ittihad Alexandria Club)
—	DF	EGY	Mahmoud Shabana (on loan to Smouha SC)

No.	Pos.	Nation	Player
—	DF	EGY	Ahmad Eid (on loan to ENPPI SC)
—	DF	EGY	Mohamed Hamdii (on loan to El Sekka El Hadid SC)
—	MF	EGY	Youssef Ayman (on loan to El Sekka El Hadid SC)
—	DF	EGY	Ahmad Zakii (on loan to ZED FC)
—	MF	EGY	Youssef Obama (on loan to Al-Hazem)

=== Players under contract ===
Note: Flags indicate national team as defined under FIFA eligibility rules; some limited exceptions apply. Players may hold more than one non-FIFA nationality.

No.	Pos.	Nation	Player
—	DF	EGY	Mohamed Abdel Salam

== Transfers ==
=== In ===
No.	Pos	Player	Transferred from	Fee	Date	Source
17	MF	(Morocco) Zakaria El Wardi	(Morocco) Raja CA	Free	23 August 2022	
7	FW	(Senegal) Ibrahima Ndiaye	(Switzerland) Luzern	Undisclosed	31 August 2022	
16	GK	(Egypt) Mohamed Sobhy	(Egypt) Pharco	Loan return	10 September 2022	
9	FW	(Benin) Samson Akinyoola	(Venezuela) Caracas	€1.20m	18 September 2022	
4	DF	(Egypt) Omar Gaber	(Egypt) Pyramids	Undisclosed	19 September 2022	
20	MF	(Egypt) Nabil Emad	(Egypt) Pyramids	Undisclosed	21 September 2022	
6	MF	(Egypt) Mostafa El-Zenary	(Egypt) Tala'ea El Gaish	Undisclosed	21 September 2022	
	DF	(Egypt) Mahmoud Shabana	(Egypt) Al Ittihad	Loan return	4 October 2022	
15	MF	(Egypt) Amr El Sisi	(Egypt) Tala'ea El Gaish	LE 20,000,000	10 October 2022	
11	MF	(Egypt) Mostafa Shalaby	(Egypt) ENPPI	LE 20,000,000	10 October 2022	
19	FW	(Egypt) Nasser Mansi	(Egypt) National Bank	Undisclosed	28 January 2023	
18	MF	(Morocco) Ahmed Belhadji	(Egypt) Aswan	Loan	31 January 2023	

=== Out ===
No.	Pos	Player	Transferred to	Fee	Date	Source
	FW	(Egypt) Mostafa Mohamed	(Turkey) Galatasaray	€3.85m	1 July 2022	
3	MF	(Egypt) Tarek Hamed	(Saudi Arabia) Al-Ittihad	Free	24 July 2022	
1	GK	(Egypt) Mohamed Abou Gabal	(Egypt) National Bank	Free	4 September 2022	
7	DF	(Egypt) Hazem Emam	N/A	Retired	5 September 2022	
19	FW	(Egypt) Omar El Said	(Egypt) Future FC	Free	5 September 2022	
	MF	(Egypt) Ayman Hefny	N/A	Retired	9 September 2022	
26	FW	(Ivory Coast) Razack Cissé	(Egypt) National Bank	Free	27 September 2022	
4	DF	(Egypt) Mahmoud Alaa	(Egypt) Al Ittihad	Loan	4 October 2022	
	DF	(Egypt) Mahmoud Shabana	(Egypt) Smouha	Loan	8 October 2022	
17	MF	(Morocco) Zakaria El Wardi	Contract termination		8 December 2022	
14	MF	(Egypt) Youssef Obama	(Saudi Arabia) Al-Hazem	Loan	13 January 2023	
8	MF	(Egypt) Emam Ashour	(Denmark) Midtjylland	€2.8m	31 January 2023	

== Pre-season and friendlies ==
Win Draw Loss

9 September 2022 Lusail Super Cup	Al Hilal (Saudi Arabia)	1–1 (4–1 p)	(Egypt) Zamalek	Lusail, Qatar
21:00 AST (UTC+3)	Ighalo 18'; Al-Faraj (yellow card) 76'; Jahfali (yellow card) 83'		Zizo 33'; Ndiaye (yellow card) 47'; El Wardi (yellow card) 90+2'	Stadium: Lusail Iconic Stadium; Attendance: 77,000; Referee: Abdulrahman Al-Jassim (Qatar)
	Penalties
	Ighalo (penalty scored); Al-Dawsari (penalty scored); Vietto (penalty scored); Carrillo (penalty scored)		(penalty missed) Zizo; (penalty scored) Ashraf; (penalty missed) Hamdy

2 June 2023 Friendly	Zamalek (Egypt)	1–1	Yemen	Cairo
	Shokry 62'	Report	Al-Sharafi 17'	Stadium: Abdel-Latif Abu-Rajelha Stadium

== Competitions ==
=== Overall record ===
Competition	First match	Last match	Starting round	Final position	Record							
Competition	First match	Last match	Starting round	Final position	Pld	W	D	L	GF	GA	GD	Win %
Egyptian Premier League	19 October 2022	16 July 2023	Matchday 1	3rd	34	17	9	8	52	36	+16	50.00
Egypt Cup	9 May 2023	4 July 2023	Round of 32	Quarter-finals	3	3	0	0	12	4	+8	100.00
EFA Cup	26 March 2023		Round of 16	Round of 16	1	0	0	1	0	3	−3	0.00
CAF Champions League	18 September 2022	31 March 2023	First round	Group stage	10	6	1	3	17	10	+7	60.00
Total					48	26	10	12	81	53	+28	54.17

Source: Soccerway

=== Egyptian Premier League ===
==== League table ====
Pos	Team	Pld	W	D	L	GF	GA	GD	Pts	Qualification or relegation
1	Al Ahly (C)	34	25	8	1	63	13	+50	83	Qualification for the Champions League second round
2	Pyramids	34	22	7	5	58	24	+34	73	Qualification for the Champions League second round
3	Zamalek	34	17	9	8	52	36	+16	60	Qualification for the Confederation Cup second round (Note: Since the 2022–23 Egypt Cup wouldn't finish by the CAF deadline for associations to submit teams participating in next season's African competitions, the spot awarded to the Egypt Cup winners (Confederation Cup first or second round) was passed to the fourth-placed team in the league.)
4	Future	34	15	13	6	34	23	+11	58	Qualification for the Confederation Cup second round
5	Al Masry	34	11	15	8	34	33	+1	48	

Source: Soccerway
Rules for classification: 1) Points; 2) Head-to-head points; 3) Head-to-head goal difference; 4) Goal difference; 5) Goals scored; 6) Play-off.
(C) Champions

==== Results summary ====
Overall								Home						Away					
Pld	W	D	L	GF	GA	GD	Pts	W	D	L	GF	GA	GD	W	D	L	GF	GA	GD
34	17	9	8	52	36	+16	60	11	4	2	28	15	+13	6	5	6	24	21	+3

Source: worldfootball

==== Results by round ====
Round	1	2	3	4	5	6	7	8	9	10	11	12	13	14	15	16	17	18	19	20	21	22	23	24	25	26	27	28	29	30	31	32	33	34
Ground	H	A	H	A	H	A	A	H	A	H	A	H	A	H	A	H	A	A	H	A	H	A	H	H	A	H	A	H	A	H	A	H	A	H
Result	W	W	W	D	D	W	W	W	D	W	L	D	D	L	L	W	L	W	W	D	L	L	W	W	W	D	L	W	D	W	L	W	W	D
Position	2	1	3	2	3	2	2	2	2	1	2	3	3	4	5	4	4	4	5	5	5	5	4	4	4	4	4	4	4	4	4	4	3	3

Source: worldfootball
A = Away; H = Home; W = Win; D = Draw; L = Loss

==== Matches ====
The league fixtures were announced on 9 October 2022.

19 October 2022 1	Zamalek	2–0	Smouha	Cairo
19:00 EST (UTC+2)	Reda 79' (o.g.); Akinyoola 90+4'	Report	Shousha (yellow card) 35'; Dodo (yellow card) 47'; Mostafa (yellow card) 62'; Abdelfattah (yellow card) 90+4'	Stadium: Osman Ahmed Osman Stadium; Referee: Nader Qamar El-Dawla

23 October 2022 2	Ceramica Cleopatra	0–2	Zamalek	Suez
17:00 EST (UTC+2)	Hany (yellow card) 36'	Report	Jaziri 10'; El Wardi (yellow card) 41'; Awad (yellow card) 81'; Fatouh 87'; Obama (yellow card) 88'; Zizo (yellow card) 90+4'	Stadium: Suez Stadium; Referee: Mohamed Maarouf

2 November 2022 4	ENPPI	1–1	Zamalek	Cairo
19:00 EST (UTC+2)	Youssef (yellow card) 26'; Hamed (yellow card) 44'; Abdel Aati (yellow card) 69'; Kalousha 84'; Shakshak (yellow card) 90+3'	Report	Zizo 45' (pen.); Ashraf (yellow card) 69'	Stadium: Osman Ahmed Osman Stadium; Referee: Mahmoud El Banna

1 December 2022 5	Zamalek	2–2	Al Masry	Alexandria
19:00 EST (UTC+2)	Ashour 20'; El Sisi 56'; Ashraf (yellow card) 71'; Mathlouthi (yellow card) 75'	Report	Deghmoum 36', (yellow card) 66'; Shawky (yellow card) 54'; El Sheikh 60'; Boubekeur (yellow card) 77'	Stadium: Borg El Arab Stadium; Referee: Amin Omar

7 December 2022 6	Tala'ea El Gaish	0–4	Zamalek	Cairo
19:00 EST (UTC+2)	Stouhi (yellow card) 29'; Samir (yellow card) 43'; Osama (yellow card) 70'	Report	Roqa (yellow card) 18'; Zizo 44', (penalty missed) 77'; Ashour 57'; Gomaa (yellow card) 64'; Fatouh 83'; Osama 90+5'	Stadium: Police Academy Stadium; Referee: Ahmed El Ghandour

11 December 2022 3	Zamalek	1–0	Pyramids	Cairo
19:00 EST (UTC+2)	Shalaby 4'; Mathlouthi (yellow card) 49'; Akinyoola (yellow card) 85'	Report	Chibi (yellow card) 27'	Stadium: Cairo International Stadium; Referee: Ibrahim Nour El Din

16 December 2022 7	National Bank	0–1	Zamalek	Cairo
17:00 EST (UTC+2)	Kaoud (yellow card) 83'; Abou Gabal (yellow card) 89'; Ibrahim (yellow card) 90+2'; Helal (yellow card) 90+4'	Report	El Sisi (yellow card) 51'; Osama 90+6', (yellow card) 90+7'; Awad (yellow card) 90+9'	Stadium: Cairo International Stadium; Referee: Nader Qamar El-Dawla

20 December 2022 8	Zamalek	4–0	Haras El Hodoud	Cairo
19:00 EST (UTC+2)	Osama 15'; Zizo 55', (penalty missed) 88', 88'; Shikabala 78'	Report		Stadium: Cairo International Stadium; Referee: Mahmoud Nagi

25 December 2022 9	Al Mokawloon Al Arab	0–0	Zamalek	Cairo
17:00 EST (UTC+2)	Kabore (yellow card) 89'; Niass (yellow card) 90+4'	Report		Stadium: Osman Ahmed Osman Stadium; Referee: Abdelaziz El Sayed

29 December 2022 10	Zamalek	3–1	Ismaily	Cairo
19:00 EST (UTC+2)	Osama 8'; Zizo 32' (pen.); El Sisi 45+2'	Report	Fatouh 3' (o.g.); Gomaa (yellow card) 11'; Nagguez (yellow card) 30'; Madbouly (yellow card) 49'	Stadium: Cairo International Stadium; Referee: Mahmoud El Banna

2 January 2023 11	Aswan	2–1	Zamalek	Aswan
14:45 EST (UTC+2)	Abdel Ghani 4' (o.g.); Ayagwa (yellow card) 21'; Kamone 45+2'; Salah (yellow card) 55'	Report	Emad (yellow card) 38'; Abdul-Majeed 56'; Zizo (yellow card) 89'	Stadium: Aswan Stadium; Referee: Amin Omar

5 January 2023 12	Zamalek	1–1	El Dakhleya	Cairo
19:00 EST (UTC+2)	Ashour (yellow card) 69'; Abdel Ghani 90+6'	Report	Fekri 25'; Abdel Naby (yellow card) 40'; Abdallah (yellow card) 44'; Ahmed (yellow card) 60'; Atef (yellow card) 65'; El Sayed (yellow card) 84'	Stadium: Cairo International Stadium; Referee: Mahmoud Nagi

11 January 2023 13	Al Ittihad	0–0	Zamalek	Alexandria
19:00 EST (UTC+2)	Abdel Aziz (yellow card) 19'; Salah (yellow card) 79'	Report		Stadium: Borg El Arab Stadium; Referee: Ibrahim Nour El Din

21 January 2023 14	Zamalek	0–3	Al Ahly	Cairo
20:30 EST (UTC+2)		Report	Kahraba 61', (yellow card) 62'; Sherif 75', 90'; Mohamed (yellow card) 82'	Stadium: Cairo International Stadium; Referee: Slavko Vinčić (Slovenia)
Note: The game's scheduled 19:00 start time was postponed for an unspecified cause.

24 January 2023 15	Ghazl El Mahalla	2–1	Zamalek	El Mahalla El Kubra
17:00 EST (UTC+2)	Orok 4'; El Nadry 19'	Report	Zizo 62' (pen.)	Stadium: Ghazl El Mahalla Stadium; Referee: Abdelaziz El Sayed

29 January 2023 16	Zamalek	2–1	Future	Cairo
19:00 EST (UTC+2)	Jaziri 14', 34'	Report	Ali (yellow card) 20'; Mohsen 24'; Lasheen (yellow card) 48'	Stadium: Cairo International Stadium; Referee: Mahmoud El Banna

6 February 2023 17	Pharco	3–0	Zamalek	Alexandria
17:00 EST (UTC+2)	Nagib 6'; Gamal 29'; Thierry 90+4'	Report		Stadium: Borg El Arab Stadium; Referee: Mohamed Al Kalawy

13 February 2023 18	Smouha	1–3	Zamalek	Alexandria
19:00 EST (UTC+2)	El Sabahi 90'	Report	Shikabala 35'; Zizo (penalty missed) 26', 39', 42'	Stadium: Borg El Arab Stadium; Referee: Ibrahim Nour El Din

3 March 2023 20	Pyramids	0–0	Zamalek	Cairo
19:00 EST (UTC+2)		Report		Stadium: 30 June Stadium; Referee: Mohamed Adel

12 March 2023 21	Zamalek	0–2	ENPPI	Cairo
19:00 EST (UTC+2)		Report	Kabou 20'; Fawzi 67'	Stadium: Cairo International Stadium; Referee: Abdelaziz El Sayed

4 April 2023 22	Al Masry	3–2	Zamalek	Alexandria
21:15 EST (UTC+2)	Grendo 25'; Abou Slemma 60'; Yehia 87'	Report	Boubekeur 1' (o.g.); Mansi 21'	Stadium: Borg El Arab Stadium; Referee: Mahmoud Nagi

9 April 2023 24	Zamalek	1–0	National Bank	Cairo
21:15 EST (UTC+2)	El-Wensh 30'	Report		Stadium: Cairo International Stadium; Referee: Wael Farhan

13 April 2023 25	Haras El Hodoud	0–3	Zamalek	Cairo
21:15 EST (UTC+2)		Report	Mansi 14'; Abdul-Majeed 45+2'; Belhadji 90+1'	Stadium: Cairo Military Academy Stadium; Referee: Ahmed El Ghandour

17 April 2023 26	Zamalek	2–2	Al Mokawloon Al Arab	Cairo
21:15 EST (UTC+2)	Zizo 34'; Shalaby 58' (pen.)	Report	Okoli 25'; Farid 90+2'	Stadium: Cairo International Stadium; Referee: Mahmoud Bassiouni

26 April 2023 19	Zamalek	1–0	Ceramica Cleopatra	Cairo
20:30 EST (UTC+2)	Jaziri 11'	Report		Stadium: Cairo International Stadium; Referee: Abdelaziz El Sayed
Note: The game, which was initially slated for 21 February 2023, was postponed due to Zamalek's involvement in the CAF Champions League.

13 May 2023 27	Ismaily	2–1	Zamalek	Ismailia
19:00 EST (UTC+3)	Annor 19'; Roqa 57' (o.g.)	Report	Ndiaye 38'	Stadium: Ismailia Stadium; Referee: Mohamed Adel
Note: The game, which was initially slated for 25 April 2023, was postponed.

18 May 2023 28	Zamalek	1–0	Aswan	Cairo
20:00 EST (UTC+3)	Ndiaye 45'	Report		Stadium: Cairo International Stadium; Referee: Mohammed Yousef

22 May 2023 29	El Dakhleya	1–1	Zamalek	Suez
21:30 EST (UTC+3)	Fekri 84' (pen.)	Report	Jaziri 21'; Zizo (penalty missed) 76'	Stadium: Suez Stadium; Referee: Mahmoud El Banna

30 May 2023 23	Zamalek	2–0	Tala'ea El Gaish	Cairo
20:00 EST (UTC+3)	Abdul-Majeed 88'; Ndiaye 90+2'	Report		Stadium: Cairo International Stadium; Referee: Mohamed El Hanafi
Note: The game, which was initially slated for 4 April 2023, was postponed due to Tala'ea El Gaish participation in the Arab Club Champions Cup.

5 June 2023 30	Zamalek	2–1	Al Ittihad	Cairo
20:00 EST (UTC+3)	Jaziri 23', 49'	Report	El Ghandour 65'	Stadium: Cairo International Stadium; Referee: Amin Omar

27 June 2023 32	Zamalek	2–0	Ghazl El Mahalla	Cairo
20:30 EST (UTC+3)	Zizo 15'; Bazoka 73' (o.g.)	Report		Stadium: Cairo International Stadium; Referee: Ahmed El Ghandour

8 July 2023 33	Future	2–3	Zamalek	Cairo
21:00 EST (UTC+3)	Maher 4'; Atef 25'	Report	Zizo 45+2', 54'; Mansy 46+6'	Stadium: Al Salam Stadium; Referee: Mohammad Sabahi

13 July 2023 31	Al Ahly	4–1	Zamalek	Cairo
20:30 EST (UTC+3)	El Shahat 2', 36'; Maâloul 45+1'; Sherif 90+4'	Report	Zizo 68' (pen.)	Stadium: Cairo International Stadium; Referee: Mahmoud El Banna

16 July 2023 34	Zamalek	2–2	Pharco	Cairo
21:30 EST (UTC+3)	Abdallah 26'; Ndiaye 31'	Report	Teiri 60', 72'	Stadium: Cairo International Stadium; Referee: Mostafa El Shahdi

=== Egypt Cup ===
9 May 2023 Round of 32	Zamalek	3–2 (a.e.t.)	Proxy	Cairo
18:00 EST (UTC+2)	Mohamed 42'; Mathlouthi 78'; Jaziri 99'	Report	Ahmed 7'; Gomaa 56' (pen.)	Stadium: Cairo International Stadium; Referee: Walid Abdelrazek

23 June 2023 Round of 16	Zamalek	3–1	Pharco	Cairo
21:30	Sayed 20' (pen.); Shalaby 45+6'; Abou El Fotouh 88'	Report	Gamal 47'	Stadium: Cairo International Stadium; Referee: Tarek Magdy

4 July 2023 Quarter-finals	Zamalek	6–1	Al Mokawloon Al Arab	Cairo
20:30	Sayed 17' (pen.), 40'; Jaziri 41', 51', 57'; Shikabala 54'		Farid 76'	Stadium: Cairo International Stadium; Referee: Mohamed Maarouf

=== EFA Cup ===
26 March 2023 Round of 16	Zamalek	0–3	National Bank	Cairo
21:15 EST (UTC+2)			Bambo 84'; Helal 87'; Gomaa 90+1' (o.g.)	Stadium: Osman Ahmed Osman Stadium; Referee: Mostafa Osman
Note: The match was played at Osman Ahmed Osman Stadium instead of Cairo International Stadium due to maintenance.

=== CAF Champions League ===
==== Qualifying rounds ====
The draw for the qualifying rounds was held on 9 August 2022.

==== First round ====
18 September 2022 First leg	Elect-Sport (Chad)	0–2	(Egypt) Zamalek	Yaoundé, Cameroon
16:00 (UTC+1)		Report	Shikabala 52'; Zizo 59'	Stadium: Ahmadou Ahidjo Stadium; Referee: Jean-Piere Nguiene (Congo)

25 September 2022 Second leg	Zamalek (Egypt)	2–0 (4–0 agg.)	(Chad) Elect-Sport	Cairo, Egypt
20:00 (UTC+2)	Zizo 71'; El-Wensh 79'	Report		Stadium: Cairo International Stadium; Referee: Abdulrazg Ahmed (Libya)

==== Second round ====
9 October 2022 First leg	Flambeau du Centre (Burundi)	0–1	(Egypt) Zamalek	Alexandria, Egypt
16:00 (UTC+2)		Report	Abdelmaguid 42'	Stadium: Borg El Arab Stadium; Referee: Hassan Hagi (Somalia)

14 October 2022 Second leg	Zamalek (Egypt)	5–1 (6–1 agg.)	(Burundi) Flambeau du Centre	Alexandria, Egypt
19:00 (UTC+2)	Zizo 2', 38', 88'; Ndiaye 32'; Osama 90+3'	Report	Gakwaya 24'	Stadium: Borg El Arab Stadium; Referee: Samir Guezzaz (Morocco)

==== Group stage ====
The draw for the group stage was held on 12 December 2022.

Pos	Team	Pld	W	D	L	GF	GA	GD	Pts	Qualification	EST	CRB	ZSC	MSC
1	(Tunisia) Espérance de Tunis	6	3	2	1	6	4	+2	11	Advance to knockout stage	—	0–0	2–0	1–0
2	(Algeria) CR Belouizdad	6	3	1	2	4	2	+2	10	Advance to knockout stage	0–1	—	2–0	1–0
3	(Egypt) Zamalek	6	2	1	3	7	9	−2	7		3–1	0–1	—	4–3
4	(Sudan) Al Merrikh	6	1	2	3	5	7	−2	5		1–1	1–0	0–0	—

Source: CAF
Rules for classification: Group stage tiebreakers

10 February 2023 1	Zamalek (Egypt)	0–1	(Algeria) CR Belouizdad	Cairo, Egypt
18:00 UTC+2		Report	Wamba 57' (pen.)	Stadium: Cairo International Stadium; Referee: Issa Sy (Senegal)

17 February 2023 2	Al Merrikh (Sudan)	0–0	(Egypt) Zamalek	Benghazi, Libya
15:00 UTC+2		Report		Stadium: Benina Martyrs Stadium; Referee: Daniel Nii Laryea (Ghana)

25 February 2023 3	Espérance de Tunis (Tunisia)	2–0	(Egypt) Zamalek	Tunis, Tunisia
17:00 UTC+1	Ben Hammouda 35'; Ben Romdhane 90+2'	Report		Stadium: Stade Hammadi Agrebi; Referee: Redouane Jiyed (Morocco)

7 March 2023 4	Zamalek (Egypt)	3–1	(Tunisia) Espérance de Tunis	Alexandria, Egypt
21:00 UTC+2	Gaafar 9'; Zizo 29'; Jaziri 90+1'	Report	Benayad 57'	Stadium: Borg El Arab Stadium; Referee: Blaise Yuven Ngwa (Cameroon)

17 March 2023 5	CR Belouizdad (Algeria)	2–0	(Egypt) Zamalek	Algiers, Algeria
20:00 UTC+1	Draoui 75'; Wamba 79'	Report		Stadium: Baraki Stadium; Referee: Ibrahim Mutaz (Libya)

31 March 2023 6	Zamalek (Egypt)	4–3	(Sudan) Al Merrikh	Cairo, Egypt
21:00 UTC+2	Shalaby 1'; Mansi 3', 64', 90+4'	Report	Agab 7'; Nouh 48'; Sérgio 56'	Stadium: Cairo International Stadium; Referee: Samuel Uwikunda (Rwanda)

== Statistics ==
=== Appearances and goals ===
No.	Pos	Nat	Player	Total		Premier League		Egypt Cup		EFA Cup		Champions League	
No.	Pos	Nat	Player	Apps	Goals	Apps	Goals	Apps	Goals	Apps	Goals	Apps	Goals
Goalkeepers
1	GK	(Egypt) EGY	Mohamed Awad	19	0	15	0	0	0	0	0	4	0
16	GK	(Egypt) EGY	Mohamed Sobhy	1	0	1	0	0	0	0	0	0	0
34	GK	(Egypt) EGY	Mohamed Nadim	0	0	0	0	0	0	0	0	0	0
Defenders
4	DF	(Egypt) EGY	Omar Gaber	12	0	10	0	0	0	0	0	2	0
5	DF	(Egypt) EGY	Mohamed Abdel Ghani	17	1	13	1	0	0	0	0	4	0
6	DF	(Egypt) EGY	Mostafa El Zenary	13	0	11	0	0	0	0	0	2	0
13	DF	(Egypt) EGY	Mohamed Abdel Shafy	7	0	5	0	0	0	0	0	2	0
22	DF	(Egypt) EGY	Abdallah Gomaa	6	0	4	0	0	0	0	0	2	0
24	DF	(Tunisia) TUN	Hamza Mathlouthi	15	0	12	0	0	0	0	0	3	0
28	DF	(Egypt) EGY	El-Wensh	3	1	1	0	0	0	0	0	2	1
29	DF	(Egypt) EGY	Ahmed Fatouh	12	2	9	2	0	0	0	0	3	0
36	DF	(Egypt) EGY	Hossam Abdul-Majeed	18	2	15	1	0	0	0	0	3	1
38	DF	(Egypt) EGY	Muhammad Tarek	1	0	0	0	0	0	0	0	1	0
Midfielders
7	MF	(Senegal) SEN	Ibrahima Ndiaye	3	1	1	0	0	0	0	0	2	1
10	FW	(Egypt) EGY	Shikabala	13	2	10	1	0	0	0	0	3	1
12	MF	(Egypt) EGY	Mohamed Ashraf Roqa	17	0	13	0	0	0	0	0	4	0
15	MF	(Egypt) EGY	Amr El Sisi	15	2	15	2	0	0	0	0	0	0
20	MF	(Egypt) EGY	Nabil Emad Dunga	11	0	11	0	0	0	0	0	0	0
25	MF	(Egypt) EGY	Zizo	20	11	16	6	0	0	0	0	4	5
31	MF	(Egypt) EGY	Mohamed Hossam Beso	1	0	0	0	0	0	0	0	1	0
33	FW	(Egypt) EGY	Hossam Ashraf	3	0	1	0	0	0	0	0	2	0
39	MF	(Egypt) EGY	Sayed Abdallah	17	0	13	0	0	0	0	0	4	0
40	MF	(Egypt) EGY	Sayf Farouk	4	0	3	0	0	0	0	0	1	0
41	MF	(Egypt) EGY	Mohamed Khoudary	0	0	0	0	0	0	0	0	0	0
18	MF	(Morocco) MAR	Ahmed Belhadji	0	0	0	0	0	0	0	0	0	0
Forwards
9	FW	(Benin) BEN	Samson Akinyoola	10	1	10	1	0	0	0	0	0	0
11	FW	(Egypt) EGY	Mostafa Shalaby	9	1	9	1	0	0	0	0	0	0
30	FW	(Tunisia) TUN	Seifeddine Jaziri	16	3	13	3	0	0	0	0	3	0
35	FW	(Egypt) EGY	Youssef Hassan	4	0	4	0	0	0	0	0	0	0
37	FW	(Egypt) EGY	Youssef Osama	17	5	13	4	0	0	0	0	4	1
19	FW	(Egypt) EGY	Nasser Mansi	0	0	0	0	0	0	0	0	0	0
Players transferred out during the season
8	MF	(Egypt) EGY	Emam Ashour	16	2	15	2	0	0	0	0	1	0
14	MF	(Egypt) EGY	Youssef Obama	7	0	5	0	0	0	0	0	2	0
17	MF	(Morocco) MAR	Zakaria El Wardi	2	0	0	0	0	0	0	0	2	0

Last updated: 29 January 2023
Source: Competitions

=== Goalscorers ===
Rank	Pos	No.	Nat	Name	Premier League	Egypt Cup	EFA Cup	Champions League	Total
1	MF	25	(Egypt)	Ahmed Sayed Zizo	9	0	0	6	15
2	FW	30	(Tunisia)	Seifeddine Jaziri	4	1	0	1	6
3	FW	19	(Egypt)	Nasser Mansi	2	0	0	3	5
3	MF	37	(Egypt)	Youssef Osama	4	0	0	1	5
5	DF	36	(Egypt)	Hossam Abdul-Majeed	2	0	0	1	3
5	MF	7	(Senegal)	Ibrahima Ndiaye	2	0	0	1	3
5	MF	11	(Egypt)	Mostafa Shalaby	2	0	0	1	3
7	DF	29	(Egypt)	Ahmed Fatouh	2	0	0	0	2
7	MF	8	(Egypt)	Emam Ashour	2	0	0	0	2
7	MF	15	(Egypt)	Amr El Sisi	2	0	0	0	2
7	MF	10	(Egypt)	Shikabala	1	0	0	1	2
7	DF	28	(Egypt)	El-Wensh	1	0	0	1	2
12	MF	40	(Egypt)	Seif Farouk Gaafar	0	0	0	1	1
12	DF	5	(Egypt)	Mohamed Abdel Ghani	1	0	0	0	1
12	FW	9	(Benin)	Samson Akinyoola	1	0	0	0	1
12	MF	18	(Morocco)	Ahmed Belhadji	1	0	0	0	1
12	DF	47	(Egypt)	Hatem Mohamed	0	1	0	0	1
12	DF	24	(Tunisia)	Hamza Mathlouthi	0	1	0	0	1
Own goals					2	0	0	0	2
Totals					37	3	0	17	58

Last updated: 18 May 2023
