= 2021–22 Zamalek SC season =

Zamalek SC
2021–22 season
- Chairman: Mortada Mansour
- Head coach: Patrice Carteron (until 28 February); Jesualdo Ferreira (from 5 March)
- Stadium: Cairo International Stadium
- Egyptian Premier League: 1st (champions)
- Egypt Cup: Semi-finals
- EFA Cup: Group stage
- Egyptian Super Cup: Runners-up
- CAF Champions League: Group stage
- Top goalscorer: League: Zizo (19); All: Zizo (20)

The 2021–22 Zamalek SC season was the club's 111th season in existence and the 63rd consecutive season in the top flight of Egyptian football. In addition to the domestic league, Zamalek participated in this season's editions of the Egypt Cup, the Egyptian Super Cup the EFA Cup and the CAF Champions League.

== Players ==
=== First-team squad ===
As of 31 January 2022

Note: Flags indicate national team as defined under FIFA eligibility rules; some limited exceptions apply. Players may hold more than one non-FIFA nationality.

No.	Pos.	Nation	Player
1	GK	EGY	Mohamed Abou Gabal
3	MF	EGY	Tarek Hamed
4	DF	EGY	Mahmoud Alaa
5	DF	EGY	Mohamed Abdel Ghani
7	DF	EGY	Hazem Emam (Vice-captain)
8	MF	EGY	Emam Ashour
10	MF	EGY	Shikabala (Captain)
11	FW	EGY	Islam Gaber
12	MF	EGY	Mohamed Ashraf
13	DF	EGY	Mohamed Abdel Shafy (3rd captain)
14	MF	EGY	Youssef Obama
15	FW	TUN	Seifeldine Al-Jaziri
16	GK	EGY	Mohamed Awad
18	MF	EGY	Ayman Hefny
19	FW	EGY	Omar El Said

No.	Pos.	Nation	Player
20	FW	MAR	Achraf Bencharki
22	DF	EGY	Abdallah Gomaa
24	DF	TUN	Hamza Al-Mathlouthi
25	MF	EGY	Ahmed Sayed
26	FW	CIV	Razack Cisse
27	FW	MAR	Mohamed Ounajem
28	DF	EGY	Mahmoud Hamdy
29	DF	EGY	Ahmed Fatouh
32	GK	EGY	El-Sayed Attia
33	FW	EGY	Hossam Ashraf
36	DF	EGY	Hossam Abdul-Majeed
39	MF	EGY	Sayed Abduallah
40	MF	EGY	Seif Farouk
42	DF	EGY	Muhammad Tarek
44	MF	EGY	Maged Hany

=== Out on loan ===
Note: Flags indicate national team as defined under FIFA eligibility rules; some limited exceptions apply. Players may hold more than one non-FIFA nationality.

No.	Pos.	Nation	Player
—	MF	EGY	Hamdy Alaa (on loan to Smouha)
—	DF	EGY	Mahmoud Shabana (on loan to Al Ittihad)
—	FW	EGY	Osama Faisal (on loan to National Bank of Egypt SC)
—	GK	EGY	Mahmoud Abdul-Rahim (on loan to Future)
—	GK	EGY	Muhammad Sobhy (on loan to Pharco)

No.	Pos.	Nation	Player
—	DF	EGY	Mohamed Abdel Salam (on loan to Al Ittihad)
—	GK	EGY	Ahmad Nader El-Sayed (on loan to F.C. Vizela )
—	DF	EGY	Yassin Marei (on loan to Pharco)
—	DF	EGY	Ahmed Mahmoud (on loan to Pharco)
—	FW	EGY	Marwan Hamdi (on loan to Smouha SC)

== Pre-season and friendlies ==
Win Draw Loss

30 September 2021 Friendly	Pyramids (Egypt)	0–0	(Egypt) Zamalek	Cairo, Egypt
		Report		Stadium: Air Defense Stadium sub-field

== Competitions ==
=== Overall record ===
Competition	First match	Last match	Starting round	Final position	Record							
Competition	First match	Last match	Starting round	Final position	Pld	W	D	L	GF	GA	GD	Win %
Egyptian Premier League	26 October 2021	30 August 2022	Matchday 1	Winners	34	24	5	5	62	29	+33	70.59
Egypt Cup	13 June 2022	16 January 2023	Round of 32	Semi-finals	4	3	1	0	5	2	+3	75.00
EFA Cup	14 January 2022	1 February 2022	Group stage	Group stage	5	1	1	3	3	7	−4	20.00
Egyptian Super Cup	28 October 2022		Final	Runners-up	1	0	0	1	0	2	−2	0.00
CAF Champions League	16 October 2021	1 April 2022	Second round	Group stage	8	2	4	2	8	6	+2	25.00
Total					52	30	11	11	78	46	+32	57.69

Source: Soccerway

=== Egyptian Premier League ===
==== League table ====
Pos	Team	Pld	W	D	L	GF	GA	GD	Pts	Qualification or relegation
1	Zamalek (Note: The 2021–22 Egyptian Premier League was not finished by the CAF deadline. As a result, the Egyptian Football Association announced that Zamalek and Al Ahly, who were at first and second place after 24 rounds respectively, represented Egypt in the 2022–23 CAF Champions League. Meanwhile, Future and Pyramids FC, who were at third and fourth place after 24 rounds respectively, represented Egypt in the 2022–23 CAF Confederation Cup.) (C)	34	24	5	5	62	29	+33	77	Qualification for the Champions League
2	Pyramids	34	22	5	7	56	25	+31	71	Qualification for the Confederation Cup
3	Al Ahly	34	20	10	4	62	21	+41	70	Qualification for the Champions League
4	Tala'ea El Gaish	34	14	14	6	27	24	+3	56 (Note: Head-to-Head points: Tala'ea El Gaish 6, Future 0.)	
5	Future	34	16	8	10	49	34	+15	56	Qualification for the Confederation Cup

Source: Soccerway
Rules for classification: 1) Points; 2) Head-to-Head points; 3) Head-to-Head goal difference; 4) Head-to-Head goals scored; 5) Head-to-Head away goals scored; 6) Goal difference; 7) Goals scored.
(Note: Head-to-head record is used only after all the matches between the teams in question have been played).
(C) Champions

==== Results summary ====
Overall								Home						Away					
Pld	W	D	L	GF	GA	GD	Pts	W	D	L	GF	GA	GD	W	D	L	GF	GA	GD
34	24	5	5	62	29	+33	77	10	3	4	33	19	+14	14	2	1	29	10	+19

Source: worldfootball

==== Results by round ====
Round	1	2	3	4	5	6	7	8	9	10	11	12	13	14	15	16	17	18	19	20	21	22	23	24	25	26	27	28	29	30	31	32	33	34
Ground	A	A	H	A	H	A	A	H	A	H	A	H	A	H	A	H	A	H	H	A	H	A	H	H	A	H	A	H	A	H	A	H	A	H
Result	W	W	L	W	D	W	W	W	L	W	W	W	W	D	W	W	W	L	L	D	W	W	W	W	W	W	W	W	W	W	W	D	D	L
Position	3	2	5	3	3	3	3	2	3	3	2	2	2	3	2	2	1	2	2	2	1	1	1	1	1	1	1	1	1	1	1	1	1	1

Source: worldfootball
A = Away; H = Home; W = Win; D = Draw; L = Loss

==== Matches ====
The league fixtures were announced on 12 October 2021.

26 October 2021 1	ENPPI	0–2	Zamalek	Cairo
20:00		Report	Zizo 45+7' (pen.); El Said 85'	Stadium: Petrosport Stadium; Referee: Mahmoud Nagi

31 October 2021 2	Tala'ea El Gaish	0–2	Zamalek	Borg El Arab
17:30		Report	Zizo 19' (pen.); El Said 63'	Stadium: Borg El Arab Stadium; Referee: Amin Omar

5 November 2021 3	Zamalek	3–5	Al Ahly	Cairo
20:00	Fathi 51'; Zizo 80' (pen.); Bencharki 90'	Report	Abou Gabal 16' (o.g.); Maâloul 20' (pen.), 65' (pen.); Sherif 25'; Dieng 53'	Stadium: Cairo International Stadium; Referee: Mohamed Adel

19 November 2021 4	Ismaily	0–2	Zamalek	Ismailia
17:30		Report	Zizo 84' (pen.); El Said 90+4'	Stadium: Ismailia Stadium; Referee: Mahmoud El Banna

22 November 2021 5	Zamalek	1–1	National Bank of Egypt	Cairo
20:00	Zizo 70' (pen.)	Report	Helal 16'	Stadium: Cairo International Stadium; Referee: Mahmoud Ashour

25 November 2021 6	Ceramica Cleopatra	0–1	Zamalek	Cairo
16:00		Report	Fathi 40'	Stadium: Osman Ahmed Osman Stadium; Referee: Mohamed Maarouf

21 December 2021 7	Al Mokawloon Al Arab	1–2	Zamalek	Cairo
20:00	Salem 90+1'	Report	Fathi 61'; Ounajem 76'	Stadium: Osman Ahmed Osman Stadium; Referee: Mahmoud Ashour

25 December 2021 8	Zamalek	4–0	Ghazl El Mahalla	Cairo
20:00	Fathi 35'; Bencharki 37', 74'; Ounajem 71'	Report		Stadium: Cairo International Stadium; Referee: Ibrahim Nour El Din

15 February 2022 9	Smouha	2–0	Zamalek	Borg El Arab
17:30	Ougola 64'; El Ouadi 78' (pen.)	Report		Stadium: Borg El Arab Stadium; Referee: Ahmed Ghandour

2 March 2022 10	Zamalek	3–2	Future	Cairo
20:00	Zizo 17' (pen.), 49' (pen.); Abdel Ghani 90+5'	Report	Atef 3'; Refaat 13'	Stadium: Cairo International Stadium; Referee: Mohamed El Hanafi

7 March 2022 12	Zamalek	2–1	El Gouna	Cairo
20:00	Ashour 17'; Zizo 18'	Report	El Saadawy 45+4' (pen.)	Stadium: Cairo International Stadium; Referee: Ibrahim Nour El Din

6 April 2022 11	Pyramids	2–3	Zamalek	Cairo
21:30				Stadium: 30 June Stadium

9 April 2022 13	Misr Lel Makkasa	0–1	Zamalek	Cairo
21:30				Stadium: Cairo Military Academy Stadium

12 April 2022 14	Zamalek	0–0	Pharco	Cairo
21:30				Stadium: Cairo International Stadium

19 April 2022 15	Al Ittihad	0–2	Zamalek	Borg El Arab
21:30				Stadium: Borg El Arab Stadium

28 April 2022 16	Zamalek	2–1	Al Masry	Borg El Arab
21:30	Zizo 61'; Jaziri 76'	Report	Hamed 33'	Stadium: Borg El Arab Stadium; Referee: Mohamed Maarouf Eid Mansour

1 May 2022 17	Eastern Company	1–2	Zamalek	Cairo
21:30				Stadium: Osman Ahmed Osman Stadium

10 May 2022 18	Zamalek	0–2	ENPPI	Cairo
21:00				Stadium: Cairo International Stadium

17 May 2022 19	Zamalek	0–1	Tala'ea El Gaish	Cairo
21:00				Stadium: Cairo International Stadium

28 May 2022 21	Zamalek	2–1	Ismaily	Cairo
18:30				Stadium: Cairo International Stadium

19 June 2022 20	Al Ahly	2–2	Zamalek	Cairo
20:00	Sherif 12'; Mohsen 80'	Report	Bencharki 68'; Shikabala 76'	Stadium: Al Ahly WE Al Salam Stadium; Referee: José Luis Munuera Montero (Spain)

22 June 2022 22	National Bank of Egypt	1–2	Zamalek	Cairo
19:00				Stadium: Police Academy Stadium

28 June 2022 23	Zamalek	3–2	Ceramica Cleopatra	Cairo
21:30				Stadium: Cairo International Stadium

12 July 2022 24	Zamalek	1–0	Al Mokawloon Al Arab	Cairo
18:30				Stadium: Cairo International Stadium

16 July 2022 25	Ghazl El Mahalla	0–2	Zamalek	El Mahalla El Kubra
18:30				Stadium: Ghazl El Mahalla Stadium

24 July 2022 26	Zamalek	2–0	Smouha	Cairo
21:00				Stadium: Cairo International Stadium

28 July 2022 27	Future	0–1	Zamalek	Cairo
21:00				Stadium: El Sekka El Hadid Stadium

1 August 2022 28	Zamalek	3–0	Pyramids	Cairo
21:00				Stadium: Cairo International Stadium

5 August 2022 29	El Gouna	1–4	Zamalek	El Gouna
21:00				Stadium: Khaled Bichara Stadium

9 August 2022 30	Zamalek	5–0	Misr Lel Makkasa	Cairo
21:00				Stadium: Cairo International Stadium

19 August 2022 31	Pharco	0–1	Zamalek	Alexandria
18:30				Stadium: Haras El Hodoud Stadium

23 August 2022 32	Zamalek	1–1	Al Ittihad	Cairo
20:00				Stadium: Cairo International Stadium

26 August 2022 33	Al Masry	0–0	Zamalek	Borg El Arab
21:00				Stadium: Borg El Arab Stadium

30 August 2022 34	Zamalek	1–2	Eastern Company	Cairo
21:30				Stadium: Cairo International Stadium

=== Egypt Cup ===
13 June 2022 Round of 32	Zamalek	2–1 (a.e.t.)	El Dakhleya	Cairo
20:00	Farouk 60'; Bencharki 105+1'	Report	Samir Fekry 4'	Stadium: Cairo Stadium; Referee: Mahmoud Bassiouny

15 August 2022 Round of 16	Zamalek	1–0	Ismaily	Cairo
20:00	Zizo 21' (pen.)	Report		Stadium: Cairo Stadium; Referee: Mohamed Adel

26 November 2022 Quarter-finals	Zamalek	1–0	Al Masry	Alexandria
17:00	Sika 59'	Report		Stadium: Borg El Arab Stadium; Referee: Abdelaziz El Sayed

16 January 2023 Semi-finals	Zamalek	1–1 (a.e.t.) (3–4 p)	Pyramids	Cairo
18:00	Abdelmaguid 6'; Ashour (yellow card) 21'	Report	Gabr (red card) 11'; Adel (yellow card) 43'; El Karti 55'; Fathy (yellow card) 98'	Stadium: Cairo International Stadium; Referee: Mahmoud El Banna
	Penalties
	Zizo (penalty missed); Roka (penalty scored); Shalaby (penalty scored); Ashour (penalty scored); Shikabala (penalty missed)		Sobhi (penalty scored); Ben Youssef (penalty scored); El Gabbas (penalty scored); Galal (penalty scored)

=== Egyptian Super Cup ===
28 October 2022 Final	Zamalek	0–2	Al Ahly	Al Ain
21:00		Report	Bruno Sávio 39'; Karim Fouad 90+1'	Stadium: Hazza bin Zayed Stadium; Attendance: 25,000; Referee: Fábio Veríssimo

=== EFA Cup ===
14 January 2022 1	Zamalek	0–0	ENPPI	Cairo
14:30				Stadium: Cairo International Stadium

18 January 2022 2	Pharco	2–0	Zamalek	Alexandria
14:30				Stadium: Alexandria Stadium

22 January 2022 3	Zamalek	0–3	Ghazl El Mahalla	Cairo
17:00				Stadium: Cairo International Stadium

28 January 2022 4	Ceramica Cleopatra	1–3	Zamalek	Cairo
17:00				Stadium: Osman Ahmed Osman Stadium

1 February 2022 5	Zamalek	0–1	Tala'ea El Gaish	Cairo
17:00				Stadium: Cairo International Stadium

=== CAF Champions League ===
==== Qualifying rounds ====
The draw for the qualifying rounds was held on 13 August 2021.

==== First round ====
16 October 2021 First leg	Tusker (Kenya)	0–1	(Egypt) Zamalek	Nyayo National Stadium, Nairobi
15:00 UTC+3		Report	Bencharki 47'	Referee: Bamlak Tessema Weyesa (Ethiopia)

22 October 2021 Second leg	Zamalek (Egypt)	4–0 (5–0 agg.)	(Kenya) Tusker	Borg El Arab Stadium, Alexandria
19:00 UTC+2	Obama 12', 74'; Jaziri 19'; Bencharki 72'	Report		Referee: Beida Dahane (Mauritania)

==== Group stage ====
Pos	Team	Pld	W	D	L	GF	GA	GD	Pts	Qualification	WAC	PET	ZAM	SAG
1	(Morocco) Wydad AC	6	5	0	1	15	5	+10	15	Advance to knockout stage	—	5–1	3–1	3–0
2	(Angola) Petro de Luanda	6	3	2	1	9	8	+1	11	Advance to knockout stage	2–1	—	0–0	3–0
3	(Egypt) Zamalek	6	0	4	2	3	6	−3	4		0–1	2–2	—	0–0
4	(Angola) Sagrada Esperança	6	0	2	4	1	9	−8	2		1–2	0–1	0–0	—

Source: CAF
Rules for classification: Group stage tiebreakers

12 February 2022 1	Zamalek (Egypt)	2–2	(Angola) Petro de Luanda	Cairo
18:00 UTC+2	Obama 57'; El-Wensh 90+5'	Report	Gleison 22'; Vidinho 36'	Stadium: Cairo International Stadium; Referee: Jean Jacques Ndala Ngambo (DR Congo)

19 February 2022 2	Sagrada Esperança (Angola)	0–0	(Egypt) Zamalek	Luanda, Angola
17:00 UTC+1		Report		Stadium: Estádio 11 de Novembro; Referee: Bernard Camille (Seychelles)
Note: Sagrada Esperança play their group stage home matches at Estádio 11 de Novembro, Luanda, instead of their regular home stadium Estádio Sagrada Esperança, Dundo, which did not meet CAF requirements.

26 February 2022 3	Wydad AC (Morocco)	3–1	(Egypt) Zamalek	Casablanca, Morocco
20:00 UTC+1	El Moutaraji 27'; Farhane 37'; Jabrane 88'	Report	Zizo 3'	Stadium: Stade Mohammed V Referee: Sadok Selmi (Tunisia)

11 March 2022 4	Zamalek (Egypt)	0–1	(Morocco) Wydad AC	Cairo
18:00 UTC+2		Report	Jabrane 48' (pen.)	Stadium: Cairo International Stadium; Referee: Pacifique Ndabihawenimana (Burundi)

19 March 2022 5	Petro de Luanda (Angola)	0–0	(Egypt) Zamalek	Luanda, Angola
14:00 UTC+1		Report		Stadium: Estádio 11 de Novembro; Referee: Blaise Yuven Ngwa (Cameroon)

1 April 2022 6	Zamalek (Egypt)	0–0	(Angola) Sagrada Esperança	Cairo
18:00 UTC+2		Report		Stadium: Cairo International Stadium; Referee: Celso Alvação (Mozambique)
