= 2022 Egyptian Super Cup =

Zamalek	Al Ahly
0	2
- Date: 28 October 2022
- Venue: Hazza Bin Zayed Stadium, Al Ain
- Man of the Match: Hamdy Fathy
- Referee: Fábio Veríssimo (Portugal)
- Attendance: 25,000

The 2022 Egyptian Super Cup was the 19th Egyptian Super Cup, an annual football match between the winners of the previous season's Egyptian Premier League and Egypt Cup. The match is usually contested by the winners of the Premier League and the Egypt Cup, but since Zamalek won the double (2020–21 Egyptian Premier League and 2020–21 Egypt Cup), Al Ahly qualified by default as the runners-up of the cup. The match was played on 28 October 2022 and for the fifth time in the United Arab Emirates at the Hazza Bin Zayed Stadium in Al Ain, Abu Dhabi. Al Ahly won the match 2–0.

== Details ==
28 October 2022
21:00 GST

Zamalek	0–2	Al Ahly
	Report	Bruno Sávio 39'; Karim Fouad 90+1'

Hazza Bin Zayed Stadium, Al Ain
Attendance: 25,000
Referee: Fábio Veríssimo (Portugal)

Zamalek	Al Ahly

GK	1	(Egypt) Mohamed Awad
CB	24	(Tunisia) Hamza Al-Mathlouthi		(substituted off) 73'
CB	5	(Egypt) Mohamed Abdel Ghani
CB	36	(Egypt) Hossam Abdul-Majeed
RM	4	(Egypt) Omar Gaber (c)
CM	12	(Egypt) Mohamed Ashraf		(substituted off) 64'
CM	17	(Morocco) Zakaria El Wardi	(yellow card) 12'	(substituted off) 46'
LM	29	(Egypt) Ahmed Fatouh		(substituted off) 30'
RW	21	(Egypt) Emam Ashour	(yellow card) 60'
CF	30	(Tunisia) Seifeldine Al-Jaziri		(substituted off) 64'
LW	25	(Egypt) Ahmed Sayed Zizo
Substitutes:
GK	16	(Egypt) Mohamed Sobhy
DF	6	(Egypt) Mostafa Alzenary
DF	22	(Egypt) Abdallah Gomaa
MF	10	(Egypt) Shikabala		(substituted in) 64'
MF	5	(Egypt) Mostafa Shalaby		(substituted in) 46'
MF	14	(Egypt) Youssef Obama
MF	15	(Egypt) Amr Alsisi		(substituted in) 64'
FW	37	(Egypt) Youssef Osama		(substituted in) 73'
FW	39	(Egypt) Sayed Abduallah		(substituted in) 30'
Manager:
(Portugal) Jesualdo Ferreira

GK	1	(Egypt) Mohamed El Shenawy (c)	(yellow card) 87'
RB	25	(Egypt) Akram Tawfik	(yellow card) 15'
CB	4	(Egypt) Mahmoud Metwalli
CB	24	(Egypt) Mohamed Abdelmonem
LB	8	(Tunisia) Ali Maâloul
CM	8	(Egypt) Hamdy Fathy	(yellow card) 14'
CM	17	(Egypt) Amr El Solia	(yellow card) 83'	(substituted off) 90+5'
RW	27	(Egypt) Taher Mohamed		(substituted off) 90+5'
AM	11	(Brazil) Bruno Sávio		(substituted off) 82'
LW	9	(Egypt) Ahmed Abdelkader	(yellow card) 29'	(substituted off) 67'
CF	20	(Egypt) Shady Hussein		(substituted off) 67'
Substitutes:
GK	16	(Egypt) Ali Lotfi
DF	6	(Egypt) Yasser Ibrahim
DF	28	(Egypt) Karim Fouad		(substituted in) 82'
DF	30	(Egypt) Mohamed Hany
MF	19	(Egypt) Afsha		(substituted in) 67'
MF	34	(Egypt) Mohamed Fakhri		(substituted in) 90+5'
FW	10	(Egypt) Mohamed Sherif		(substituted in) 67'
FW	18	(Egypt) Hossam Hassan	(yellow card) 39'
FW	23	(South Africa) Percy Tau		(substituted in) 90+5'
Manager:
(Switzerland) Marcel Koller

Match officials:

- Assistant referees:
  - Tiago Costa (Portugal)
  - Pedro Martinez (Portugal)
- Fourth official: Dragomir Dragunov (Bulgaria)
- Video assistant referee (VAR): Bruno Estevez (Portugal)

Match rules

- 90 minutes.
- 30 minutes of extra time if necessary.
- Penalty shoot-out if scores still level.
- Nine named substitutes, of which up to five may be used.
