= 2020–21 Zamalek SC season =

Zamalek SC
2020–21 season
- Chairman: Emad Abdel-Aziz (interim)
- Head coach: Jaime Pacheco
- Stadium: Cairo International Stadium
- Egyptian Premier League: Winners
- Egypt Cup: Winners
- CAF Champions League: Group stage

The 2020–21 Zamalek SC season was the club's 110th season in existence and the 62nd consecutive season in the top flight of Egyptian football. In addition to the domestic league, Zamalek participated in this season's editions of the Egypt Cup and the CAF Champions League.

== Players ==
Note: Flags indicate national team as defined under FIFA eligibility rules; some limited exceptions apply. Players may hold more than one non-FIFA nationality.

No.	Pos.	Nation	Player
1	GK	EGY	Mohamed Abou Gabal
3	MF	EGY	Tarek Hamed
4	DF	EGY	Mahmoud Alaa
5	DF	EGY	Mohamed Abdel Ghani
6	DF	EGY	Mohamed Abdel Salam
7	DF	EGY	Hazem Emam (Vice-captain)
8	MF	EGY	Emam Ashour
9	FW	EGY	Marwan Hamdi
10	MF	EGY	Mahmoud Abdul-Raziq (Captain)
11	MF	EGY	Ahmed Sayed
12	MF	EGY	Mohamed Ashraf
13	MF	TUN	Ferjani Sassi
14	MF	EGY	Youssef Ibrahim
15	FW	MAR	Hamid Ahadad
16	GK	EGY	Mahmoud Abdul-Rahim (4th captain)
17	MF	EGY	Mahmoud Abdel Aziz
19	DF	EGY	Mohamed Abdel Shafy (3rd captain)

No.	Pos.	Nation	Player
20	FW	MAR	Achraf Bencharki
21	GK	EGY	Mohamed Awad
22	DF	EGY	Abdallah Gomaa
23	FW	EGY	Islam Gaber
24	DF	TUN	Hamza Al-Mathlouthi
28	DF	EGY	Mahmoud Hamdy
29	DF	EGY	Ahmed Fatouh
30	FW	TUN	Seifeldine Al-Jaziri
32	MF	EGY	Hussein Faisal
33	FW	EGY	Hossam Ashraf
34	DF	EGY	Ahmed Eid
36	DF	EGY	Hossam Abdul-Majeed
37	FW	EGY	Osama Faisal
38	DF	EGY	Hatem Muhammad
50	MF	EGY	Mohamed Hossam Eldin
35	DF	EGY	Yassin Marei
—	MF	EGY	Ayman Hefny

=== Out on loan ===
Note: Flags indicate national team as defined under FIFA eligibility rules; some limited exceptions apply. Players may hold more than one non-FIFA nationality.

No.	Pos.	Nation	Player
—	FW	CIV	Razack Cisse (on loan to Al Ittihad)
—	GK	EGY	Muhammad Sobhy (on loan to Al Ittihad)
—	FW	EGY	Mostafa Fathi (on loan to Smouha)
—	FW	EGY	Karim Bambo (on loan to National Bank of Egypt)

No.	Pos.	Nation	Player
—	FW	EGY	Mostafa Mohamed (on loan to Galatasaray)
—	FW	MAR	Mohamed Ounajem (on loan to Wydad)
—	FW	EGY	Omar El Said (on loan to El Gouna)

== Competitions ==
=== Overall record ===
Competition	First match	Last match	Starting round	Final position	Record							
Competition	First match	Last match	Starting round	Final position	Pld	W	D	L	GF	GA	GD	Win %
Egyptian Premier League	12 December 2020	27 August 2021	Matchday 1	Winners	34	24	8	2	61	21	+40	70.59
Egypt Cup	14 April 2021	21 July 2022	Round of 32	Winners	5	5	0	0	10	3	+7	100.00
CAF Champions League	12 February 2021	10 April 2021	Group stage	Group stage	6	2	2	2	7	5	+2	33.33
Total					45	31	10	4	78	29	+49	68.89

Source: Soccerway

=== Egyptian Premier League ===
==== League table ====
Pos	Team	Pld	W	D	L	GF	GA	GD	Pts	Qualification or relegation
1	Zamalek (Note: The 2020–21 Egyptian Premier League was not finished by the CAF deadline. As a result, the Egyptian Football Association announced that Zamalek and Al Ahly, who were at first and second place after 29 rounds respectively, will represent Egypt in the 2021–22 CAF Champions League. Meanwhile, Al Masry and Pyramids FC, who were at third and fourth place after 29 rounds respectively, will represent Egypt in the 2021–22 CAF Confederation Cup.) (C)	34	24	8	2	61	21	+40	80	Qualification for the Champions League
2	Al Ahly	34	22	10	2	72	29	+43	76	Qualification for the Champions League
3	Pyramids	34	13	16	5	51	37	+14	55	Qualification for the Confederation Cup
4	Smouha	34	12	18	4	54	41	+13	54	
5	Al Masry	34	13	11	10	44	38	+6	50	Qualification for the Confederation Cup

Source: Soccerway
Rules for classification: 1) Points; 2) Head-to-Head points; 3) Head-to-Head goal difference; 4) Head-to-Head goals scored; 5) Head-to-Head away goals scored; 6) Goal difference; 7) Goals scored.
(Note: Head-to-head record is used only after all the matches between the teams in question have been played).
(C) Champions

==== Results summary ====
Overall								Home						Away					
Pld	W	D	L	GF	GA	GD	Pts	W	D	L	GF	GA	GD	W	D	L	GF	GA	GD
34	24	8	2	61	21	+40	80	24	8	2	61	21	+40	0	0	0	0	0	0

==== Results by round ====
Round	1	2	3	4	5	6	7	8	9	10	11	12	13	14	15	16	17	18	19	20	21	22	23	24	25	26	27	28	29	30	31	32	33	34
Ground	A	A	A	H	A	H	A	H	A	H	A	H	H	A	H	A	H	H	H	H	A	H	H	H	A	H	A	H	A	A	H	A	H	A
Result	W	D	W	L	W	W	W	W	D	W	L	W	W	D	W	W	W	D	D	W	D	W	W	W	D	W	W	W	W	W	W	W	W	D
Position																																		

A = Away; H = Home; W = Win; D = Draw; L = Loss

==== Matches ====
The league fixtures were announced on 23 November 2020.

12 December 2020 1	Al Mokawloon Al Arab	0–2	Zamalek

17 December 2020 2	Pyramids	1–1	Zamalek

28 December 2020 3	Smouha	0–2	Zamalek

2 January 2021 5	ENPPI	1–2	Zamalek

9 January 2021 6	Zamalek	3–0	Tala'ea El Gaish

12 January 2021 7	Al Masry	0–1	Zamalek

19 January 2021 8	Zamalek	1–0	El Gouna

23 January 2021 9	Aswan	0–0	Zamalek

28 January 2021 10	Zamalek	4–1	Misr Lel Makkasa

2 February 2021 11	Ghazl El Mahalla	2–1	Zamalek

7 February 2021 12	Zamalek	2–0	Al Ittihad

17 February 2021 13	Zamalek	2–1	Ismaily

1 March 2021 14	Wadi Degla	0–0	Zamalek

11 March 2021 15	Zamalek	2–0	Ceramica Cleopatra

18 April 2021 4	Zamalek	1–2	Al Ahly

22 April 2021 16	El Entag El Harby	0–2	Zamalek

26 April 2021 17	Zamalek	4–1	National Bank

29 April 2021 18	Zamalek	2–2	Al Mokawloon Al Arab

2 May 2021 19	Zamalek	1–1	Pyramids

6 May 2021 20	Zamalek	2–1	Smouha

10 May 2021 21	Al Ahly	1–1	Zamalek

14 May 2021 22	Zamalek	3–1	ENPPI

20 May 2021 23	Zamalek	2–1	Tala'ea El Gaish	Cairo
21:00				Stadium: Cairo International Stadium

24 May 2021 24	Zamalek	3–2	Al Masry	Alexandria
21:00				Stadium: Alexandria Stadium

30 May 2021 25	El Gouna	0–0	Zamalek	El Gouna
21:00				Stadium: Khaled Bichara Stadium

17 June 2021 26	Zamalek	3–0	Aswan	Cairo
19:00				Stadium: Cairo International Stadium; Referee: Mahmoud Bassiouni

28 June 2021 27	Misr Lel Makkasa	0-1	Zamalek

7 August 2021 28	Zamalek	3–0	Ghazl El Mahalla

10 August 2021 29	Al Ittihad	1-2	Zamalek

14 August 2021 30	Ismaily	0-2	Zamalek

16 August 2021 31	Zamalek	1-0	Wadi Degla

20 August 2021 32	Ceramica Cleopatra	1-2	Zamalek

24 August 2021 33	Zamalek	2-0	El Entag El Harby

27 August 2021 34	National Bank of Egypt	1-1	Zamalek

=== Egypt Cup ===
14 April 2021 32	Zamalek	3–1	Haras El Hodoud	Suez City, Suez
	Obama 19'; Alaa 51' (pen.), 68' (pen.)		Youssef 9'	Stadium: Suez Stadium; Referee: Amr Ramadan

27 May 2021 16	Zamalek	1-0	Ismaily	Suez City, Suez
	Bencharki 41'			Stadium: Suez Stadium; Referee: Amin Omar

22 June 2021 Quarter-finals	Zamalek	1-0	Misr Lel Makkasa	Suez City, Suez
	Obama 57'			Stadium: Suez Stadium; Referee: Ahmed El Ghandour

23 May 2022 Semi-finals	Zamalek	2-1	Aswan	Cairo
	Mahmoud Alaa 35'; Obama 36'		Mohamed Gedo 9'	Stadium: Arab Contractors Stadium

21 July 2022 Final	Zamalek	2-1	Al Ahly	Cairo
	Zizo 5'; Ashour 29'		Hassan 55'	Stadium: Cairo International Stadium; Attendance: 5,000; Referee: Szymon Marciniak (Poland)

=== CAF Champions League ===
==== Qualifying rounds ====
The draw for the qualifying rounds was held on 9 November 2020.

==== Group stage ====
The draw for the group stage was held on 8 January 2021.

Pos	Team	Pld	W	D	L	GF	GA	GD	Pts	Qualification	EST	MCA	ZAM	TEU
1	(Tunisia) Espérance de Tunis	6	3	2	1	9	6	+3	11	Advance to knockout stage	—	1–1	3–1	2–1
2	(Algeria) MC Alger	6	2	3	1	4	4	0	9	Advance to knockout stage	1–1	—	0–2	1–0
3	(Egypt) Zamalek	6	2	2	2	7	5	+2	8		0–1	0–0	—	4–1
4	(Senegal) Teungueth	6	1	1	4	4	9	−5	4		2–1	0–1	0–0	—

Source: Soccerway
Rules for classification: Group stage tiebreakers
