= 2024–25 National Bank of Egypt SC season =

National Bank of Egypt
2024–25 season
- Chairman: Ashraf Nassar
- Manager: Tarek Mostafa
- Stadium: Cairo International Stadium
- Egyptian Premier League: 6th
- Egypt Cup: Round of 16
- Egyptian League Cup: Group stage
- Top goalscorer: League: Yaw Annor; Osama Faisal (3each); All: Osama Faisal (6)
- Biggest win: Ceramica Cleopatra 0–5 National Bank
- Biggest defeat: Pyramids 3–1 National Bank
- All statistics correct as of 21 January 2025.

The 2024–25 season is the 74th season in National Bank of Egypt SC's history and the fifth consecutive season in the Premier League. In addition to the domestic league, National Bank of Egypt is set to compete in the domestic cup, and the Egyptian League Cup.

== Transfers ==
=== In ===
Date	Pos.	Player	From	Fee	Ref.
2 September 2024	GK	(Egypt) Abdelaziz El Balouti	(Egypt) ENPPI	€222,000	
3 October 2024	MF	(Egypt) Sayed Abdallah	(Egypt) Zamalek	Loan	

=== Out ===
Date	Pos.	Player	To	Fee	Ref.
21 August 2024	FW	(Egypt) Karim Bambo	(Egypt) Al Masry	Free	
18 September 2024	MF	(Egypt) Ibrahim Hassan	(Egypt) Ghazl El Mahalla	Free	
25 October 2024	GK	(Egypt) Hassan Mahmoud Shahin	(Egypt) El Gouna	Free	
20 January 2025	DF	(Palestine) Mousa Farawi	(Egypt) Ghazl El Mahalla	Undisclosed	

== Friendlies ==
10 October 2024 Friendly	Ghazl El Mahalla (Egypt)	1–1	(Egypt) National Bank	Cairo
	Castelo	Report	Annor

11 November 2024 Friendly	National Bank (Egypt)	3–1	(Egypt) El Sharkia Lel Dokhan
		Report

17 November 2024 Friendly	National Bank (Egypt)	5–0	(Egypt) Cascada
		Report

== Competitions ==
=== Overall record ===
Competition	First match	Last match	Starting round	Record							
Competition	First match	Last match	Starting round	Pld	W	D	L	GF	GA	GD	Win %
Egyptian Premier League	1 November 2024	30 May 2025	Matchday 1	9	4	2	3	9	9	+0	44.44
Egypt Cup	4 January 2025		Round of 32	1	1	0	0	1	0	+1	100.00
Egyptian League Cup	11 December 2024		Group stage	1	1	0	0	5	0	+5	100.00
Total				11	6	2	3	15	9	+6	54.55

Last updated: 21 January 2025
Source: Competitions

=== Egyptian Premier League ===
==== League table ====
Pos	Team	Pld	W	D	L	GF	GA	GD	Pts	Qualification
3	Zamalek	8	4	3	1	14	6	+8	47	Qualification for the Confederation Cup first or second round
4	Al Masry	8	3	3	2	10	9	+1	42	Qualification for the Confederation Cup first or second round
5	National Bank of Egypt SC	8	2	3	3	13	12	+1	38	
6	Ceramica Cleopatra	8	4	1	3	15	12	+3	37	
7	Pharco	8	2	3	3	8	16	−8	32	

Source: Soccerway (championship round)
Rules for classification: 1) Points; 2) Goal difference; 3) Goals scored; 4) Play-off tie.
(Note: Clubs qualified for this phase with the full regular season points they got, but without goals for or against)

==== Results summary ====
Overall								Home						Away					
Pld	W	D	L	GF	GA	GD	Pts	W	D	L	GF	GA	GD	W	D	L	GF	GA	GD
9	4	2	3	9	9	0	14	1	2	1	2	2	0	3	0	2	7	7	0

Last updated: 21 January 2025.

==== Results by round ====
Round	1	2	3	4	5	6	7	8	9
Ground	A	H	A	H	A	H	A	H	A
Result	L	D	L	D	W	L	W	W	W
Position	14	12	17	17	14				

Updated to match(es) played on 21 January 2025. Source:
A = Away; H = Home; W = Win; D = Draw; L = Loss

==== Matches ====
The league schedule was released on 19 October 2024.

1 November 2024 1	Zamalek	3–2	National Bank	Cairo
20:00 UTC+2	Maher 38'; Mansi 53'; El Said 90+8' (pen.)		Helal 50' (pen.), 76' (pen.)	Stadium: Al Salam Stadium; Referee: Mohamed Adel
Note: The match was held at Al Salam Stadium instead of Cairo International Stadium.

9 November 2024 2	National Bank	0–0	Pharco	Cairo
17:00 UTC+2				Stadium: Al Salam Stadium; Referee: Ahmed Al-Ghandour

22 November 2024 3	Pyramids	3–1	National Bank	Cairo
17:00 UTC+2	Fathi 50'; Awujoola 52', 74'		Abdel Ghani 45'	Stadium: 30 June Stadium; Referee: Mahmoud Bassiouni

1 December 2024 4	National Bank	0–0	Al Ahly	Cairo
17:00 UTC+2				Stadium: Al Salam Stadium; Referee: Mohamed El Hanafy

20 December 2024 5	Modern Sport	0–1	National Bank	Cairo
17:00 UTC+2			Faisal 44' (pen.)	Stadium: Cairo International Stadium; Referee: Mohamed Maarouf

26 December 2024 6	National Bank	1–2	Ceramica Cleopatra	Cairo
17:00 UTC+2	Faisal 42'		Nabil 76'; Osman 78'	Stadium: Cairo International Stadium; Referee: Mohamed El Ghazi

1 January 2025 7	Ghazl El Mahalla	0–1	National Bank	El Mahalla El Kubra
20:00 UTC+2			Annor 6'	Stadium: Ghazl El Mahalla Stadium; Referee: Mostafa Osman

11 January 2025 8	National Bank	1–0	Ismaily	Cairo
16:00 UTC+2	Annor 49'

21 January 2025 9	El Gouna	1–2	National Bank	El Gouna
16:00 UTC+2	Magdy 12' (pen.)		Serial (yellow card) 11' (yellow-red card) 72'; Faisal 35' (pen.); Annor 59', (red card) 69'	Stadium: Khaled Bichara Stadium; Referee: Nader Qamar El Dawla

=== Egypt Cup ===
4 January 2025 Round of 32	National Bank	1–0	Petrol Asyut	Cairo
14:30 UTC+2	Faisal 79' (pen.)			Stadium: Cairo International Stadium; Referee: Mohamed El Atbany

=== Egyptian League Cup ===
==== Group stage ====
Pos	Team	Pld	W	D	L	GF	GA	GD	Pts	Qualification
1	National Bank	4	2	2	0	9	3	+6	8	Advance to knockout stage
2	Ceramica Cleopatra	4	2	1	1	8	7	+1	7	Advance to knockout stage
3	Ghazl El Mahalla	4	1	2	1	4	5	−1	5	
4	Al Masry	4	0	4	0	3	3	0	4	
5	ZED	4	0	1	3	4	10	−6	1	

Source: EPL
Rules for classification: Group stage tiebreakers

11 December 2024 1	Ceramica Cleopatra	0–5	National Bank	Cairo
20:00 UTC+2	Issa (red card) 26'		Faisal 29', 76'; Annor 53', 78'; Helal 85'	Stadium: Osman Ahmed Osman Stadium; Referee: Wael Farhan

18 March 2025 2	National Bank	v	Ghazl El Mahalla	Cairo
21:00 UTC+2				Stadium: Cairo International Stadium

24 March 2025 3	National Bank	v	Al Masry	Suez
21:00 UTC+2				Stadium: Suez Stadium

1 April 2025 4	ZED	v	National Bank	Cairo
20:00 UTC+3				Stadium: Cairo International Stadium
