= List of Egyptian football transfers summer 2022 =

This is the list of Egyptian football transfers for the summer of 2022. The window closed on October 10, 2022 which witnessed the conclusion of the largest number of deals in the history of the top division.

== Al Ahly ==
In:

No.	Pos.	Nation	Player
—		BRA	Bruno Sávio (from Bolívar)
—		EGY	Shady Hussein (from Ceramica Cleopatra)
—		EGY	Mostafa Saad (from Ceramica Cleopatra)
—		EGY	Karim El Debes (from Wadi Degla)
—		EGY	Abdelrahman Rashdan (from Wadi Degla)

Out:

No.	Pos.	Nation	Player

== Future ==
In:

No.	Pos.	Nation	Player
—		EGY	Mohanad Lasheen (from Tala'ea El Gaish)
—		EGY	Ali El Fil (from Tala'ea El Gaish)
—		EGY	Hesham Hafez
—		EGY	Ali Zaazaa
—		EGY	Ahmed Yahya
—		FRA	Abdallah Yaisien
—		EGY	Omar El Said
—		EGY	Hesham Balaha
—		EGY	Mahmoud Hani
—		GUI	Hadji Barry

Out:

No.	Pos.	Nation	Player

== Ghazl El Mahalla ==
In:

No.	Pos.	Nation	Player
—	GK	EGY	Ahmed Maihoub (from Wadi Degla)
—	MF	EGY	Karim Mostafa (from Al Mokawloon Al Arab)
—	MF	EGY	Salah Atef (from ENPPI)
—	MF	EGY	Youssef Alesh (from Youth Center Kom Hamada)
—	MF	NGR	Gabriel Orok (from Enyimba)
—	MF	EGY	Ahmed El Geaidy (free agent)

Out:

No.	Pos.	Nation	Player

== Ismaily ==
In:

No.	Pos.	Nation	Player
—	MF	GHA	Yaw Annor (from Ashanti Gold)
—	DF	TUN	Nour Zamen Zammouri (from CS Sfaxien)
—	FW	TUN	Firas Chaouat (from CS Sfaxien)
—	FW	EGY	Basem Morsy (from Ceramica Cleopatra)
—	MF	EGY	Saleh Gomaa (from Ceramica Cleopatra)
—	DF	EGY	Ahmed Mohsen (from Ceramica Cleopatra)

Out:

No.	Pos.	Nation	Player

== Pyramids ==
In:

No.	Pos.	Nation	Player
—		EGY	Mostafa Fathi (from Al-Taawoun)
—		EGY	Mahmoud Abdel Aati (from Ismaily)
—		EGY	Karim Hafez (from Yeni Malatyaspor)
—		MAR	Mohamed Chibi (from AS FAR)
—		EGY	Abdel Rahman Gouda (from Al Nasr)

Out:

No.	Pos.	Nation	Player

== Smouha ==
In:

No.	Pos.	Nation	Player
—		NGR	Junior Ajayi (from Al-Nasr)
—		PLE	Mohammed Bassim (from Persib Bandung)
—		QAT	Ahmad Abdelhay (from Al Kharaitiyat)
—		EGY	Ahmed Al-Saadani (from National Bank)
—		EGY	Ahmed Hamed Shusha (from Al Masry)
—		EGY	Ahmed Abdel Aziz (from ENPPI)
—		EGY	Islam Kano (from Petrojet)
—		EGY	Mahmoud Al-Malik (from Abou Qir Fertilizers)
—		GHA	Benjamin Bernard Boateng (from Al Ittihad)

Out:

No.	Pos.	Nation	Player

== Zamalek ==
In:

No.	Pos.	Nation	Player
—		SEN	Ibrahima Ndiaye (from Luzern)
—		MAR	Zakaria El Wardi (from Raja CA)
—		EGY	Mohamed Sobhy (from Pharco)
—		EGY	Mostafa El Zenary (from Tala'ea El Gaish)
—		EGY	Nabil Emad (from Pyramids)
—		EGY	Omar Gaber (from Pyramids)
—		BEN	Samson Akinyoola (from Caracas)
—		EGY	Amr El Sisi (from Tala'ea El Gaish)
—		EGY	Youssef Hassan (from Wadi Degla)
—		EGY	Mostafa Shalaby (from ENPPI)

Out:

No.	Pos.	Nation	Player

== See also ==
- 2022–23 Egyptian Premier League
