= 2023–24 National Bank of Egypt SC season =

National Bank of Egypt SC
2023–24 season
- Chairman: Ashraf Nassar
- Manager: Nikodimos Papavasiliou (until 30 October); Tarek Mostafa (from 30 October)
- Stadium: Cairo International Stadium
- Egyptian Premier League: 13th
- Egypt Cup: Round of 16
- League Cup: Group stage
- Biggest win: National Bank 5–0 Baladiyat El Mahalla
- Biggest defeat: National Bank 1–5 ENPPI

The 2023–24 National Bank of Egypt SC season was the club's 73rd season in existence and the fourth consecutive season in the top flight of Egyptian football. In addition to the domestic league, National Bank of Egypt participated in this season's editions of the Egypt Cup, and the League Cup.

== Players ==
=== First-team squad ===
As of 18 September 2023

Note: Flags indicate national team as defined under FIFA eligibility rules; some limited exceptions apply. Players may hold more than one non-FIFA nationality.

No.	Pos.	Nation	Player
—	GK	EGY	Mohamed Abou Gabal
—	GK	EGY	Ahmed Sobhi
—	DF	EGY	Ayman Ashraf
—	DF	GHA	Issahaku Yakubu
—	DF	EGY	Amir Medhat
—	DF	EGY	Saeed Simbouri
—	DF	EGY	Moaz Al-Hanawi
—	DF	EGY	Mohamed Bassiouni
—	DF	EGY	Mahmoud El-Gazzar
—	MF	EGY	Mohamed Fathi

No.	Pos.	Nation	Player
—	MF	EGY	Ahmed Al-Nadry
—	MF	CIV	Serge Arnaud Aka
—	MF	EGY	Mahmoud Sayed
—	MF	EGY	Ahmed Madbouly
—	MF	EGY	Mohamed Grendo
—	MF	EGY	Ibrahim Hassan
—	MF	EGY	Ahmed Yasser
—	FW	EGY	Karim Bambo
—	FW	EGY	Mahmoud Kaoud
—	FW	EGY	Osama Faisal

== Transfers ==
=== In ===
Pos.	Player	Transferred from	Fee	Date	Source
DF	(Egypt) Ayman Ashraf	(Egypt) Al Ahly	Free	18 July 2023	
MF	(Egypt) Ahmed Madbouly	(Egypt) Ismaily	Free	22 July 2023	
MF	(Ivory Coast) Serge Arnaud Aka	(Egypt) Ismaily	Free	28 July 2023	
MF	(Egypt) Mohamed Grendo	(Egypt) Al Masry	Free	30 July 2023	
GK	(Egypt) Hassan Shaheen	(Egypt) Al Mokawloon Al Arab	Free	5 August 2023	
DF	(Egypt) Moaz El Henawy	(Egypt) Ghazl El Mahalla	Free	14 August 2023	
MF	(Egypt) Imad Fathi	(Egypt) Aswan		6 September 2023	
MF	(Egypt) Ibrahim Hassan	(Egypt) Al Ittihad		11 September 2023	
MF	(Egypt) Ahmed Al-Nadry	(Egypt) Ghazl El Mahalla		13 September 2023	
DF	(Egypt) Alaa Atta	(Egypt) Petrojet	Free	13 September 2023	
DF	(Palestine) Mousa Farawi	(Palestine) Hilal Al-Quds	Free	1 February 2024	

=== Out ===
Pos.	Player	Transferred to	Fee	Date	Source
FW	(Guinea) Moussa Diawara	(Egypt) Tala'ea El Gaish	Free	30 July 2023	
DF	(Egypt) Mido Mostafa	(Egypt) Smouha	€89,000	5 August 2023	
FW	(Egypt) Hossam Ashraf	(Egypt) Zamalek	Loan return	10 August 2023	
GK	(Egypt) Mahmoud El Zanfly	(Egypt) El Dakhleya	Free	12 August 2023	
FW	(Egypt) Fady Farid	(Egypt) Smouha	€118,000	15 August 2023	
MF	(Egypt) Islam Gaber	(Egypt) Smouha	Free	17 August 2023	
MF	(Tunisia) Firas Iffia	(Tunisia) CS Sfaxien	Free	30 August 2023	
DF	(Egypt) Ahmed El Aash	(Egypt) Baladiyat El Mahalla	Free	1 September 2023	
DF	(Egypt) Ahmed Yassin	(Egypt) Al Ittihad	Loan + €30,000	2 September 2023	
MF	(Egypt) Mohamed Laaba	(Egypt) Olympic Alexandria	Free	3 September 2023	
MF	(Egypt) Hossam El Sanea	(Egypt) Aswan	Free	9 September 2023	

== Pre-season and friendlies ==
Win Draw Loss

The team held a preparatory camp in Borg El Arab starting on 20 August, during which it played 3 friendly matches.

30 August 2023 Friendly	Pharco (Egypt)	1–1	(Egypt) National Bank	Alexandria
20:00 UTC+3		Report		Stadium: Al Max stadium

31 August 2023 Friendly	Al Ittihad (Egypt)	1–0	(Egypt) National Bank	Alexandria
	Boateng			Stadium: Alexandria Stadium

20 November 2023 Friendly	Pharco (Egypt)	1–1	(Egypt) National Bank	Alexandria
		Report		Stadium: Haras El Hodoud Stadium

== Competitions ==
=== Overall record ===
Competition	First match	Last match	Starting round	Final position	Record							
Competition	First match	Last match	Starting round	Final position	Pld	W	D	L	GF	GA	GD	Win %
Egyptian Premier League	18 September 2023	18 August 2024	Matchday 1	13th	34	9	9	16	46	45	+1	26.47
2023–24 Egypt Cup	31 May 2024	9 August 2024	Round of 32	Round of 16	2	1	0	1	5	4	+1	50.00
League Cup	10 January 2024	26 January 2024	Group stage	Group stage	3	1	1	1	4	5	−1	33.33
Total					39	11	10	18	55	54	+1	28.21

Source: Soccerway

=== Egyptian Premier League ===
==== League table ====
Pos	Team	Pld	W	D	L	GF	GA	GD	Pts
11	Al Ittihad	34	9	14	11	30	42	−12	41
12	El Gouna	34	9	12	13	32	44	−12	39
13	National Bank of Egypt	34	9	9	16	46	45	+1	36
14	Ismaily	34	7	12	15	33	43	−10	33 (Note: Tied on head-to-head points (3). Head-to-head goal difference: Ismaily +1, Pharco –1.)
15	Pharco	34	6	15	13	32	43	−11	33

Source: Soccerway
Rules for classification: 1) Points; 2) Head-to-head points; 3) Head-to-head goal difference; 4) Goal difference; 5) Goals scored; 6) Play-off tie.
(Note: Head-to-head records are used for final standings only)

==== Results summary ====
Overall								Home						Away					
Pld	W	D	L	GF	GA	GD	Pts	W	D	L	GF	GA	GD	W	D	L	GF	GA	GD
27	7	6	14	40	41	−1	27	5	2	7	26	24	+2	2	4	7	14	17	−3

Last updated: 24 June 2024.

==== Results by round ====
Round	1	2
Ground	A	
Result	L	
Position	15	

A = Away; H = Home; W = Win; D = Draw; L = Loss

==== Matches ====
The league fixtures were unveiled on 11 September 2023.

18 September 2023 1	Tala'ea El Gaish	2–0	National Bank	Cairo
19:00 UTC+3	Shehata (yellow card) 39'; Joules (yellow card) 41'; Waheed 63'; Radwan (yellow card) 67'; Osama 87'	Report	Fathi (yellow card) 45+1'; Aka (yellow card) 74'; Yakubu (yellow card) 90'	Stadium: Gehaz El Reyada Stadium; Referee: Mostafa Osman

25 September 2023 2	National Bank	0–1	Pyramids	Cairo
16:00 UTC+3		Report	Sobhi (yellow card) 18'; Ashraf 69' (o.g.); Hamdy (yellow card) 85'	Stadium: Al Salam Stadium; Referee: Ahmed Al Ghandour

7 October 2023 3	National Bank	1–2	Zamalek	Cairo
19:00 UTC+3	Bambo 45+9'		Awad (red card) 45+1'; Zizo 54'; Shikabala 90'	Stadium: Cairo International Stadium; Referee: Mohamed Maarouf

21 October 2023 4	ENPPI	3–1	National Bank	Cairo
19:00 UTC+3	Kalousha (penalty missed) 29', 29'; Kamal 79' (pen.); Naser 90+6'		Sabeha 48' (o.g.)	Stadium: Petrosport Stadium; Referee: Walid Abdelrazek

5 November 2023 6	Al Masry	0–4	National Bank	Alexandria
19:00 UTC+2			Faisal 1', 15', 62'; Bambo 54'	Stadium: Alexandria Stadium; Referee: Hisham Al-Qadi

5 December 2023 8	Ismaily	2–1	National Bank	Ismailia
19:00 UTC+2	El Saeey 16'; Hamdy 67'		Medhat 48'	Stadium: Ismailia Stadium; Referee: Ibrahim Mohamed

14 December 2023 9	National Bank	2–3	El Gouna	Cairo
16:00 UTC+2	Grendo 52'; Bambo 58', (penalty missed) 74'		Ghanem 46', 62', 63'	Stadium: Osman Ahmed Osman Stadium; Referee: Hussni Sultan

25 December 2023 10	Baladiyat El Mahalla	0–2	National Bank	El Mahalla El Kubra
19:00 UTC+2			Madbouly 68' (pen.); Simporé 84'	Stadium: El Mahalla Stadium; Referee: Mohamed El Atabani

30 December 2023 11	National Bank	3–1	Al Mokawloon Al Arab	Cairo
16:00 UTC+2	Madbouly (penalty missed) 58'; Kaoud 58', 62', 90+5'		Salem 14'	Stadium: Al Salam Stadium; Referee: Nader Qamar Al-Dawla

13 February 2024 12	Smouha	1–1	National Bank	Alexandria
19:00 UTC+2	Hassan 85'		Annor 35'	Stadium: Alexandria Stadium; Referee: Hamada Al-Qalawi

18 February 2024 13	National Bank	1–1	ZED	Cairo
16:00 UTC+2	Reda 90+1' (o.g.)		Atef Otta 43'	Stadium: Cairo International Stadium; Referee: Wael Farhan

25 February 2024 14	Al Ittihad	0–0	National Bank	Alexandria
19:00 UTC+2				Stadium: Alexandria Stadium; Referee: Mahmoud El Dessoky

1 March 2024 16	Pharco	2–1	National Bank	Alexandria
16:00 UTC+2				Stadium: Haras El Hodoud Stadium; Referee: Mahmoud Wafa

12 March 2024 15	National Bank	4–3	Al Ahly	Cairo
21:30 UTC+2	Bambo 7'; Helal 63'; Simporé 84'; Annor 90+4', (yellow card) 90+7'		Modeste 4'; Slim 28'; El Shahat 72'	Stadium: Cairo International Stadium; Referee: Mahmoud El Banna

4 April 2024 17	National Bank	1–0	El Dakhleya	Cairo
22:00 UTC+2				Stadium: Cairo International Stadium

17 April 2024 18	National Bank	0–1	Tala'ea El Gaish	Cairo
20:00 UTC+2				Stadium: Cairo International Stadium

24 April 2024 19	Pyramids	3–2	National Bank	Cairo
20:00 UTC+2

2 May 2024 20	Zamalek	1–0	National Bank	Cairo
19:00 UTC+2

5 May 2024 21	National Bank	1–5	ENPPI	Cairo
19:00 UTC+2				Stadium: Cairo International Stadium

10 May 2024 22	Modern Future	1–1	National Bank	Cairo
19:00 UTC+2

16 May 2024 23	National Bank	5–2	Al Masry	Cairo
19:00 UTC+2				Stadium: Cairo International Stadium

21 May 2024 24	Ceramica Cleopatra	1–0	National Bank	Cairo
19:00 UTC+2				Stadium: Osman Ahmed Osman Stadium; Referee: Mahmoud Nagy

26 May 2024 25	National Bank	2–2	Ismaily	Cairo
16:00 UTC+2				Stadium: Cairo International Stadium; Referee: Amin Omar

17 June 2024 26	El Gouna	1–1	National Bank	El Gouna
16:00 UTC+2				Stadium: Khaled Bichara Stadium; Referee: Mohamed Youssef

24 June 2024 27	National Bank	5–0	Baladiyat El Mahalla	Cairo
16:00 UTC+2				Stadium: Cairo International Stadium

28 June 2024 28	Al Mokawloon Al Arab	1–4	National Bank	Cairo
16:00				Stadium: Osman Ahmed Osman Stadium

6 July 2024 30	ZED	0–1	National Bank

13 July 2024 29	National Bank	1–2	Smouha

20 July 2024 31	National Bank	0–0	Al Ittihad

1 August 2024 32	Al Ahly	1–0	National Bank

13 August 2024 33	National Bank	0–0	Pharco

18 August 2024 34	El Dakhleya	0–0	National Bank

=== Egypt Cup ===
31 May 2024 Round of 32	National Bank	4–1	Petrojet SC	Cairo
17:00 UTC+3				Stadium: Cairo International Stadium

9 August 2024 Round of 16	National Bank	1–3	Al Masry	Alexandria
				Stadium: Borg El Arab International Stadium
