= 2021 Egypt Cup final =

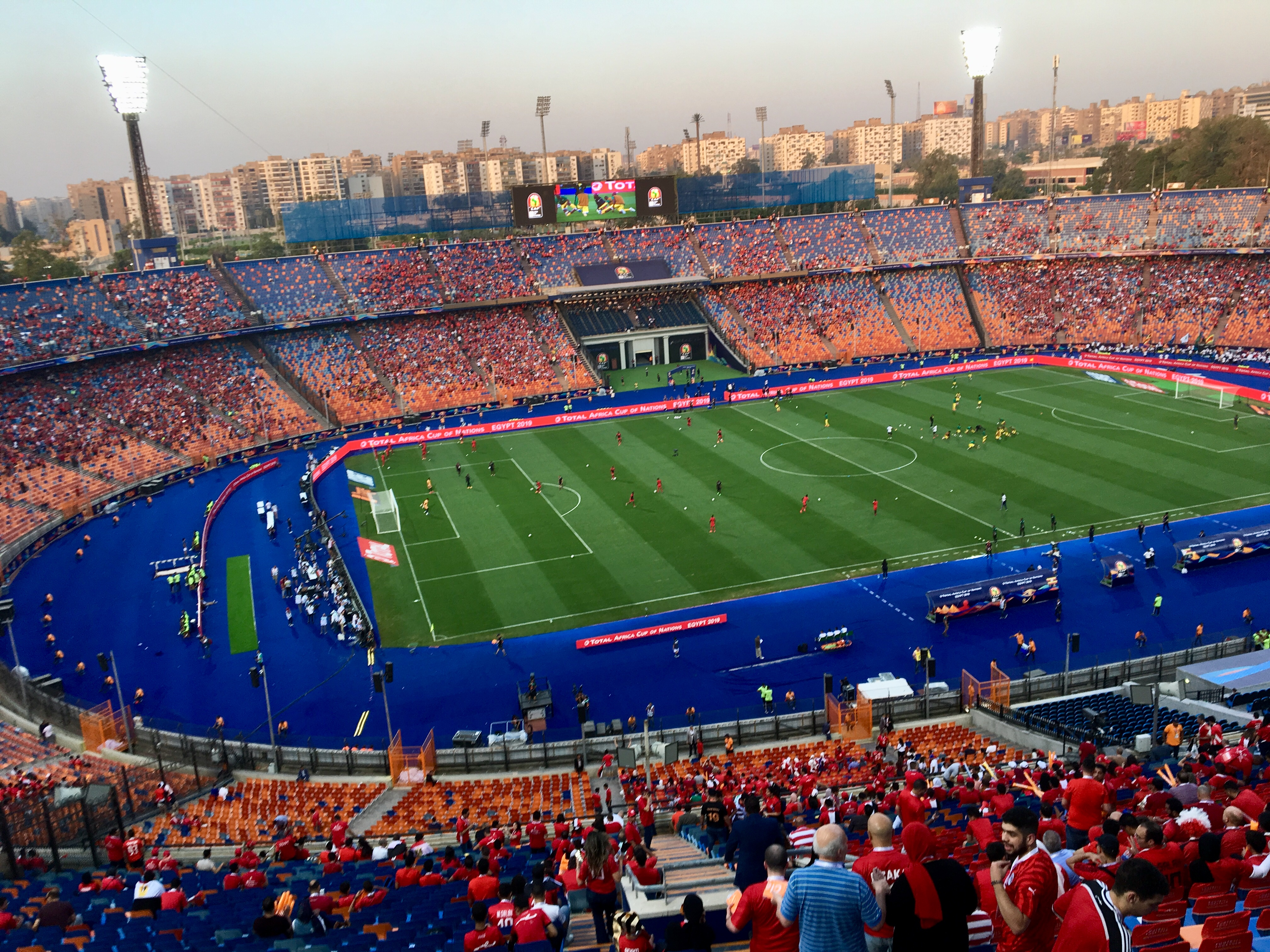
- Cairo Stadium will host the final
- Event: 2020–21 Egypt Cup
Al Ahly	Zamalek
1	2
- Date: 21 July 2022
- Venue: Cairo International Stadium, Cairo
- Referee: Szymon Marciniak (Poland)
- Attendance: 5,000
- Weather: Clear; 29 °C (84 °F)

The 2021 Egypt Cup final was the 89th Egypt Cup Final, the final match of the 2020–21 Egypt Cup, Africa's oldest football cup competition played at Cairo Stadium in Cairo, Egypt, on 21 July 2022 between Al Ahly and Zamalek.

Since the competition wouldn't finish by the CAF deadline for associations to submit participating teams in African competitions for the 2021–22 season, for the second Consecutive time the spot awarded to the Egypt Cup winners (Confederation Cup preliminary or first round) was passed to the fourth-placed team in the 2020–21 Egyptian Premier League, Pyramids.

== Route to the final ==
In all results below, the score of the finalist is given first. From the round of 16, all matches were played on neutral grounds.

=== Al Ahly ===
Round	Opposition	Score
R32	Al Nasr	2–1
R16	ENPPI	1–0
QF	Pyramids	2–1
SF	Petrojet	2–0

As an Egyptian Premier League club, Al Ahly started in the round of 32 where they were drawn with Egyptian Second Division team Al Nasr. Al Ahly won 2–1 with one goal from Walid Soliman and one from Walter Bwalya. In the round of 16, they drew fellow Egyptian Premier League team ENPPI and won 1–0 with Salah Mohsen scoring the only goal of the game. In the quarter-finals, they were drawn with Egyptian Premier League side Pyramids, the team that eliminated Al Ahly from the round of 16 of 2018–19 Egypt Cup, Al Ahly was able to avenge their last meeting loss and won 2–1 with one goal from Taher Mohamed and one from Hossam Hassan. In the semi-finals, they were drawn with Egyptian Premier League side Petrojet and progressed to the final after a 2–0 win with Afsha and Mohamed Abdelmonem on the scoresheet, this was the first match for Al Ahly new manager Ricardo Soares.

=== Zamalek ===
Round	Opposition	Score
R32	Haras El Hodoud	3–1
R16	Ismaily	1–0
QF	Misr Lel Makkasa	2–0
SF	Aswan	2–1

As an Egyptian Premier League club, Zamalek also started in the round of 32. They were drawn at home against Egyptian Second Division side Haras El Hodoud. Zamalek won 3–1 with a goal from Youssef Obama and two goals from Mahmoud Alaa. In the round of 16, they drew fellow Egyptian Premier League team Ismaily and won 1–0 thanks to a goal from Achraf Bencharki.In the quarter finals, they played against fellow Egyptian Premier League side Misr Lel Makkasa and won 2–0 with the two goals scored by Youssef Obama. In the semi-finals, they were drawn against Egyptian Premier League side Aswan and progressed to the final after a 2–1 win with one goal from a goal from Youssef Obama and a goal from Mahmoud Alaa.

== Match ==
=== Details ===
21 July 2022
21:00

Al Ahly	1–2	Zamalek
Hassan 55'	Report	Zizo 5'; Ashour 29'

Cairo International Stadium, Cairo
Attendance: 5,000
Referee: Szymon Marciniak (Poland)

Zamalek

GK	1	(Egypt) Mohamed El Shenawy (c)
RB	30	(Egypt) Mohamed Hany	(substituted off) 46'
CB	6	(Egypt) Yasser Ibrahim		(substituted off) 73'
CB	12	(Egypt) Ayman Ashraf	(yellow card) 20'	(substituted off) 46'
LB	21	(Tunisia) Ali Maâloul	(yellow card) 80'
CM	17	(Egypt) Amr El Solia		(substituted off) 46'
CM	8	(Egypt) Hamdy Fathy	(yellow card) 77'
CM	15	(Mali) Aliou Dieng
RW	19	(Egypt) Mohamed "Afsha" Magdy
LW	35	(Egypt) Ahmed Abdel Kader
CF	10	(Egypt) Mohamed Sherif		(substituted off) 25'
Substitutes:
GK	16	(Egypt) Ali Lotfi
DF	5	(Egypt) Ramy Rabia
DF	24	(Egypt) Mohamed Abdelmonem		(substituted on) 46'
DF	20	(Egypt) Mahmoud Wahid
MF	11	(Egypt) Walid Soliman	(yellow card) 47'	(substituted on) 46'
MF	22	(Egypt) Mohamed Mahmoud		(substituted on) 46'
DF	28	(Egypt) Karim Fouad
FW	18	(Egypt) Salah Mohsen		(substituted on) 73'
FW	9	(Egypt) Hossam Hassan		(substituted on) 25'
Manager:
(Portugal) Ricardo Soares

GK	21	(Egypt) Mohamed Awad (c)
RWB	24	(Tunisia) Hamza Mathlouthi
CB	28	(Egypt) Mahmoud Hamdy	(yellow card) 57'
CB	36	(Egypt) Hossam Abdul-Majeed
CB	5	(Egypt) Mohamed Abdel Ghani
LWB	29	(Egypt) Ahmed Fatouh	(yellow card) 8'	(substituted off) 73'
CM	8	(Egypt) Emam Ashour	(yellow card) 3'
CM	39	(Egypt) Sayed Abduallah		(substituted off) 67'
RW	25	(Egypt) Zizo	(yellow card) 87'
LW	20	(Morocco) Achraf Bencharki
CF	30	(Tunisia) Seifeddine Jaziri		(substituted off) 59'
Substitutes:
GK	34	(Egypt) Mohamed Nadim
DF	22	(Egypt) Abdallah Gomaa
DF	7	(Egypt) Hazem Emam		(substituted on) 73'
DF	4	(Egypt) Mahmoud Alaa
MF	10	(Egypt) Shikabala
MF	27	(Morocco) Mohamed Ounajem
MF	14	(Egypt) Youssef Obama	(yellow card) 84'	(substituted on) 59'
MF	12	(Egypt) Mohamed Ashraf		(substituted on) 67'
MF	18	(Egypt) Ayman Hefny
Manager:
(Portugal) Jesualdo Ferreira

=== Statistics ===
Overall
Statistic	Al Ahly	Zamalek
Goals scored	1	2
Total shots	10	14
Shots on target	2	5
Ball possession	71%	29%
Corner kicks	7	8
Yellow cards	4	4
Red cards	0	0
