= Khoudary =

Khoudary, Khodari (Arabic: الخضري) is an Arabic surname. Notable people with the surname include:

- Hind Khoudary (born 1995/1996), Palestinian journalist
- Mohamed Khoudary (born 2002), Egyptian footballer
- Omar Al-Khodari (born 1990), Saudi football player
- Riyad Hassan El-Khoudary (born 1943), Egyptian professor
