= Mohamed Hamdi (footballer, born 2000) =

Egyptian footballer

Mohamed Hamdii
Personal information
- Full name: Mohamed Hamdi
- Date of birth: 1 June 2000 (age 26)
- Position: Defender

Team information
- Current team: Zamalek
- Number: 2

Youth career
- –2022: Zamalek

Senior career*
Years	Team	Apps	(Gls)
2022–	Zamalek	1	(0)

International career
	Egypt U20	0	(0)
- * Club domestic league appearances and goals

Mohamed Hamdi (Arabic: مُحَمَّد حَمْدِيّ; born 1 June 2000) is an Egyptian professional footballer who plays as a defender for Egyptian Premier League club Zamalek.
