= Riyad Hassan El-Khoudary =

Palestinian professor (born 1943)

Riyad Hassan El Khoudary
- الأستاذ الدكتور رياض حسن الخضري
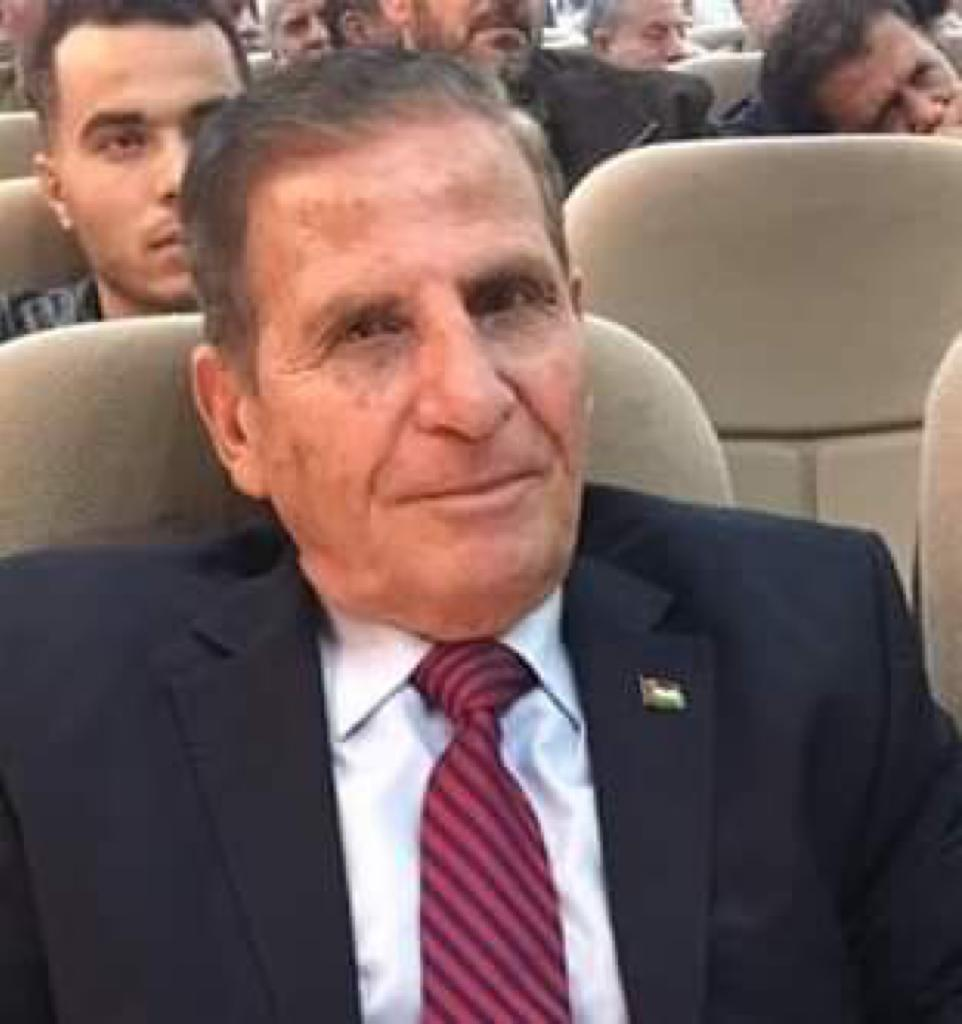
- El-Khoudary in 2005
- Born: July 27, 1943 (age 82); Gaza, Palestine

Riyad Hassan El Khoudary (Arabic: رياض حسن الخضري) (born July 27, 1943) is a Palestinian professor. He has been the president of Gaza University since August 1, 2020. He is the vice-chairman of the board of trustees of Al-Quds Open University in Palestine, and a member of the Palestinian Higher Council for Innovation and Excellence since March 2018.

- Member of the Palestinian National Council (PNC), 1996–present
- Member of the Palestinian Central Council (PCC) and member of the PLO-Executive committee, 1996–2018
- Head of the Education and Higher Education Department of PLO, 2005–2018
- Chairman of the board of trustees of Al-Azhar Institutions in Palestine, 2014–2016
- Founder and first President of Al-Azhar University in Gaza, 1991–2005
- Leader of the founding team of Gaza University; its president 2007–2010, 2013–2016, and August 2020–present
- Academic staff member at Tripoli University in Libya, 1972–1982
- Academic staff member at the Islamic University in Gaza, 1983–1991
- Being a geologist he shared strongly on the Middle East Multilateral peace talks and headed the Palestinian delegation in the working group on water resources, 1992–present
- PhD in geology from the University of Stuttgart – Germany in 1972; professor degree from the Islamic University in Gaza in 1985

== Childhood and education ==
El Khoudary was born in 1943 in Gaza City, then in the British mandate of Palestine, where he attended primary, preparatory, and secondary schools, and completed his secondary school education in June 1960. In September 1960, he moved to Egypt and studied geology at the Faculty of Science of the University of Cairo. He earned his B.Sc., special degree in geology in June 1964.

In 1965 he was awarded a scholarship from the German Academic Exchange Service (DAAD) for postgraduate studies in geology. Subsequently, he went to Germany in the summer of 1965, studied German language for six months and then started his postgraduate studies. In December 1968 he earned his M.Sc. in geology, and in August 1972 he earned his PhD in the same field from the University of Stuttgart. The title of his published doctoral dissertation was "Investigations in the Upper Jurassic of the Iberian Cordillera with special regard to the Micro fauna (Province of Teruel and Rincon de Ademuz)".

== Academic and professional career ==
=== Al Fateh University – Tripoli ===
After earning his PhD in geology from the University of Stuttgart in August 1972, El Khoudary moved subsequently to Libya to work as a lecturer at the Faculty of Petroleum & Mining Engg. of Al Fateh University in Tripoli and stayed at that university until the summer of 1983.

During this period he shared strongly on the establishment and development of the Geological & Geophysical Engg. Department, and was named as the head of the department, serving from 1979 to 1983. Beside his teaching activities he devoted some of his time to research and publish papers, and to write books in his field of specialization. He was promoted to assistant professor in April 1976, and to associate professor in August 1979.

=== Islamic University – Gaza ===
In 1983 El Khoudary returned to Gaza to work at the faculty of Science of the Islamic University of Gaza (IUG).

Beside his teaching activities he was charged with the following administrative positions:

- Vice president for administrative affairs, Jan. 1984 – Dec. 1985, Oct. 1987 – Oct. 1989
- Vice president of scientific research, Dec. 1989 – Nov. 1990
- Dean of the faculty of Science, Dec. 1985 – Oct. 1987

He also published some papers, and was promoted to full professor in 1986.

=== Al-Azhar University – Gaza ===
In 1991 the Palestine Liberation Organization (PLO) leadership in Tunisia decided to establish a national university in the Gaza Strip (Al-Azhar University - Gaza). El Khoudary headed the team of preparation and establishment of the new university in Gaza, and was its first president from 1991 to 2005. During this time, El Khoudary and his colleagues established a university with about 14,000 students studying in nine faculties in addition to other facilities and centers. In 1995 El Khoudary established and headed the Water Research Center at the university until 2005.

=== Al-Quds Open University ===
1992 saw the establishment of Al-Quds Open University in the West bank and Gaza. El Khoudary was charged with the establishment of the branch of Gaza and was named as its vice president for Gaza Strip affairs until December 1999. In March 2006 El Khoudary was assigned as the Vice Chairman of the board of trustees of Al-Quds Open University of Palestine.

=== Gaza University – Gaza ===
In 2006 a group of active Palestinians led by El Khoudary decided to establish a private University in Gaza under the name Gaza Women University. The university started its academic activities in September 2009, and its name was changed in 2010 to Gaza University to enable both genders to join it. El Khoudary was its president from 2007 to 2010, and again from 2013 to 2016.

=== Al Azhariya Institutes in Palestine ===
In 2014 El Khoudary was assigned as the chairman of the board of trustees of Al Azhariya Institutes in Palestine. He resigned from the position at the end of 2016.

=== The Palestinian Higher Council for Innovation and Excellence ===
At the beginning of March 2017 El Khoudary was assigned as a member of the Palestinian Higher Council for Innovation and Excellence.

== Involvement with PLO activities ==
El Khoudary was nominated by the PLO in 1992 as a member of the Palestinian team of the Middle East Peace talks. He headed the Palestinian delegation in the multilateral working group on water resources. Through this activity he was able to share the Palestinian delegation on studies on water. During the meeting of the PNC in Gaza in 1996, El Khoudary was elected as a member of the PLO executive committee headed by the president Yasser Arafat. In February 2005 El Khoudary was assigned by president Mahmood Abbas to be the head of the department of education and higher education of the PLO, taking the responsibility of the Palestinians in the diaspora.

== Achievements ==
- Founder of the Geological Engg. Dept. at Al Fateh University](Tripoli) – Libya (1979)
- Founder of Al-Azhar University - Gaza (1991)
- Founder of Al-Quds Open University Branch in Gaza (1992)
- Founder of the Water Research Center at Al-Azhar University - Gaza (1995)
- Head of the founding team of Gaza University (2006) (formerly known as Gaza Women University)

== Publications ==
- EL KHOUDARY, R.H.: Investigations in the Upper Jurassic of the Iberian Cordillera with special regards to the microfauna (Province Teruel and Rincon de Ademuz).N. Jb. Geol. Palaeontol. Abh, 144, no. 3, p. 296–341, Stuttgart – 1974.
- EL KHOUDARY, R.H.: Upper Eocene Planktonic Foraminifera from Wadi Bakur, S. E. Tukrah, NE-Libya. Lib. J. Sci. vol. 6B, P.55-78, 9 pls., Tripoli – 1976.
- EL KHOUDARY, R. H.: Truncorotaloides libyaensis, a new planktonic Foraminifer from Jabal Al Akhdar, NE-Libya. Rev. Esp. Micropal,. vol.9, no.3, p. 327–336, 2 plc., Madrid – 1977.
- EL KHOUDARY, R. H.: Studies on the genus Truncorotaloides (Foram.) from the North Eastern Libyan Jamahiriya. Lib. J. Sci., vol. 8A, P.55-67, 3 pls. Tripoli – 1978.
- EL KHOUDARY, R. H.: Agglutinated foraminifera from the Cenomanian Sidi as' Sid formation of NW-Libya. FPME Journal, vol. 1, p. 59–64, 2 pls., Tripoli – 1978.
- HELMDACH, F. F. & EL KHOUDARY, R. H.: Ostacoda and Planktonic Foraminifera from the Late Eocene of Al Jabal Al Akhdar, NE-Libya. In the Geology of Libya, vol. 1, p. 255–270, 2 pls. Academic Press, London – 1980.
- EL KHOUDARY, R.H.: Planktonic Foraminifera from the Middle Eocene of the northern escarpment of Al Jabal Al Akhdar, NE-Libya In the Geology of Libya, vol. 1, p. 193–204, 2 pls. Academic Press, London – 1980.
- EL KHOUDARY, R. H. & HELMDACH, F. F.: Biostratigraphic studies on the Middle Eocene of the northern escarpment of Al Jabal Al Akhdar, NE-Libya. FPME Journal, vol. 2, no. 1, p. 35–46, 3 pls., Tripoli – 1980.
- EL KHOUDARY, R. H. & HELMDACH, F. F.: Biostratigraphic studies on the Upper Eocene Apollonia Formation of N. W. Jabal Al Akhdar, NE-Libya Rev. Esp. Micropal., vol 13, no. 1, p. 5–23, 8 pls. Madrid – 1981.
- HELMDACH, F. F. & EL KHOUDARY, R. H.: Three new Ostracod species from the Middle Eocene of the northern escarpment of Al Jabal Al Akhdar, NE-Libya FPME Journal, vol. 3, p. 23–28, 1pl., Tripoli – 1982.
- EL KHOUDARY, R. H.: Micropaleontology of the Eocene Apollonia Formation of Al Jabal Al Akhdar, NE-Libya. In proceedings of the Second Jordanian Geological Conference, 22–24. April 1985, p. 290–305, Amman – 1985.
- EL KHOUDARY, R.H. & ANAN H. S.: Preliminary study on the Geology and Geomorphology of Wadi Ghazzah, Gaza Strip. Ibid, p. 531–539, Amman – 1985.
- EL KHOUDARY, R. H.: Rocks and Soil in Palestine (in Arabic), in Proceedings of the First Palestinian Ecology Conference, p. 29–34, Bethlehem – 1987.
- EL KHOUDARY, R.H. & ZAROUR, H.: Water in Palestine (in Arabic), In proceeding of the fifth meeting of the Arabic committee for The Hydrologic programme. 6 pages, Cairo – 1992.
- EL KHOUDARY, R. H.: Water Crisis in the Gaza Strip and proposed solutions, in Water as an Element of cooperation and Development in the Middle East, p. 363–370, Ankara – 1994.
- EL KHOUDARY, R. H. et al. "Water laws, Water Institutions, and Water Supply Economics, vol. 1, Palestinian part". Report edited by J.M. Trolldalen for the Center of Environmental Studies and Research Management, Oslo – 1997.
- Middle East Regional Study on Water Supply and Demand Development, a study prepared by the Multilateral working group on water resources, GTZ – Palestinian Team Germany 1996, 1997, 1998
