= Ahmed Nader =

Egyptian footballer (born 2003)

Personal information
- Full name: Ahmed Nader El Sayed
- Date of birth: 16 June 2003 (age 23)
- Place of birth: Cairo, Egypt
- Height: 1.92 m (6 ft 4 in)
- Position: Goalkeeper

Team information
- Current team: ZED FC
- Number: 33

Youth career
- 2018–2023: Zamalek
- 2021–2023: → Vizela (youth loan)

Senior career*
Years	Team	Apps	(Gls)
2024–25	PAOK B	1	(0)
2025-	ZED FC	0	(0)

International career^{‡}
2022–2023	Egypt U20	22	(0)
2020–	Egypt U23	2	(0)
- * Club domestic league appearances and goals as of 18 December 2025 ‡ National team caps and goals as of 2 May 2022

Ahmed Nader El Sayed (Arabic: أحمد نادر السيد; born 16 March 2003), is an Egyptian professional footballer who plays as a goalkeeper for ZED FC.

== Club career ==
Having risen through the youth ranks of Zamalek, Nader was invited to train with the first team in March 2021. After continuing to shine for the under-23 side, he was loaned to Portuguese Primeira Liga side Vizela in September of the same year. Initially assigned to the youth sides, Nader's good performances saw him promoted to the first team in January 2022, in preparation for the Taça de Portugal game against Moreirense. Although he did not feature, he was named on the bench.

At the conclusion of his loan deal with Vizela, Nader returned to Zamalek to learn that his contract with the White Castle had expired, and he was a free agent. On 18 January 2024, after half a year without a club, he signed for Greek side PAOK.

== International career ==
Nader has represented Egypt at under-20 level.

After Nader's perceived misjudgement of a cross at the 2021 Arab Cup U-20, leading to Saudi Arabia's eventual 3–2 win, Nader was criticised on social media by a number of fans. Former Egypt international goalkeeper Sherif Ekramy came to his defence, calling the criticism a "moral crime".

== Personal life ==
Ahmed is the son of former Egyptian international goalkeeper Nader El-Sayed.
