= Mohamed Hossam Beso =

Egyptian footballer (born 2001)

Beso
Personal information
- Full name: Mohamed Hossam Eldin Gaber
- Date of birth: 1 January 2001 (age 25)
- Position: Midfielder

Youth career
- –2020: Zamalek

Senior career*
Years	Team	Apps	(Gls)
2020–2024	Zamalek	7	(0)
2024	→ Sekka El Hadid (loan)		
2024–2025	Raya		

International career
2023	Egypt U23		
- * Club domestic league appearances and goals as of 23:14, 15 May 2025 (UTC)

Mohamed Hossam Eldin Gaber (Arabic: محمد حسام; born 1 January 2001), known as Beso (Arabic: بيسو), is an Egyptian professional footballer who plays as a midfielder.

== Club career ==
Beso began his career in the academy of Zamalek, and went on to make his debut in a friendly against Wadi Degla in 2020. He made his professional debut the same year, starting and playing the entire first half in a 0–0 draw against Masr, before being replaced by Zizo. Having featured once more in the Egyptian League Cup against Ghazl El Mahalla, he opted to stay with the club he supported, rather than leave on loan.

Injured for the beginning of the 2022–23 season, he was registered in the first team for their CAF Champions League squad list, alongside fellow youth player Hossam Ashraf. Still on the fringes of the main squad, he was promoted to first team training in October 2022 ahead of Zamalek's Egypt Cup quarter-final match against Al Masry. In May 2023, Beso was reportedly involved in a training ground altercation with teammate Nabil Emad, something Emad later denied.

In August 2023 it was reported that Zamalek manager Juan Carlos Osorio requested Beso leave the club on loan, in order to gain experience. By December of the same year, he had received offers from three unnamed clubs, with Al Ahly and Pharco being reported as potential suitors. According to reports, despite Beso being willing to move to a new club, Zamalek refused all offers.

Despite these reports, Beso would eventually join Egyptian Second Division A club Sekka El Hadid on a six-month loan deal on 31 January 2024. He later revealed that Zamalek had received offers from Egyptian Premier League sides Ismaily and El Dakhleya, but as they wanted him on loan for a year-and-a-half, Zamalek had rejected—and that his move to Sekka El Hadid had been against his will. Following the end of his loan spell, and subsequent release by Zamalek, he joined Raya.

== International career ==
Beso represented the Egypt Olympic team in 2023.

== Career statistics ==
=== Club ===
As of 15 May 2025.

Appearances and goals by club, season and competition
Club	Season	League			National Cup (Note: Includes Egypt Cup)		League Cup (Note: Includes Egyptian League Cup)		Continental		Other		Total	
Club	Season	Division	Apps	Goals	Apps	Goals	Apps	Goals	Apps	Goals	Apps	Goals	Apps	Goals
Zamalek	2019–20	Egyptian Premier League	1	0	0	0	0	0	0	0	0	0	1	0
Zamalek	2020–21	Egyptian Premier League	0	0	0	0	0	0	0	0	0	0	0	0
Zamalek	2021–22	Egyptian Premier League	2	0	1	0	0	0	0	0	0	0	3	0
Zamalek	2022–23	Egyptian Premier League	3	0	0	0	0	0	1 (Note: Appearances in the CAF Champions League)	0	0	0	4	0
Zamalek	2023–24	Egyptian Premier League	1	0	0	0	0	0	0	0	0	0	1	0
Career total			7	0	1	0	0	0	1	0	0	0	9	0
