= Mohamed Nadim =

Egyptian footballer (born 2001)

Personal information
- Full name: Mohamed Nadim
- Date of birth: 20 July 2001 (age 25)
- Position: Goalkeeper

Team information
- Current team: Zamalek
- Number: 34

Youth career
- –2022: Zamalek

Senior career*
Years	Team	Apps	(Gls)
2022–	Zamalek	1	(0)

International career
	Egypt U20	0	(0)
- * Club domestic league appearances and goals

Mohamed Nadim (Arabic: محمد نديم; born 20 July 2001) is an Egyptian professional footballer who plays as a goalkeeper for Egyptian Premier League club Zamalek.
