= Youssef Osama =

Egyptian footballer (born 2000)

Youssef Osama Nabih
Personal information
- Full name: Youssef Osama
- Date of birth: 7 September 2000 (age 26)
- Place of birth: Egypt
- Height: 1.85 m (6 ft 1 in)
- Position: Forward

Youth career
- –2022: Zamalek

Senior career*
Years	Team	Apps	(Gls)
2020–23	Zamalek	32	(4)
2022-25	Pyramids FC	9	(0)
2025-2026	ZED FC	8	(0)

International career
	Egypt U20	0	(0)
- * Club domestic league appearances and goals

Youssef Osama Nabih (Arabic: يوسف أسامة نبيه; born 7 September 2000) is an Egyptian professional footballer who plays as a forward.
