= Seif Gaafar =

Egyptian footballer (born 1999)

Personal information
- Full name: Seif Farouk Fouad Gaafar
- Date of birth: 5 December 1999 (age 26)
- Place of birth: Cairo, Egypt
- Height: 1.80 m (5 ft 11 in)
- Position: Midfielder

Team information
- Current team: Zamalek
- Number: 7

Youth career
- Zamalek

Senior career*
Years	Team	Apps	(Gls)
2019–2023	Zamalek		
2019–2020	→ Smouha (loan)		
2023–2024	Pyramids	1	(0)
2024–	Zamalek	45	(0)
- * Club domestic league appearances and goals

Seif Gaafar (Arabic: سيف جعفر; born 5 December 1999) is an Egyptian professional footballer who plays as a midfielder in Zamalek SC. He is the son of Egyptian football legend Farouk Gaafar.

== Honours ==
Zamalek

- Egyptian Premier League: 2021–22, 2025–26
- Egypt Cup: 2024–25
