= Hatem Mohamed =

Egyptian footballer (born 2001)

Personal information
- Date of birth: 26 October 2001 (age 25)
- Position: Defender

Team information
- Current team: Zamalek
- Number: 3

Youth career
- –2020: Zamalek

Senior career*
Years	Team	Apps	(Gls)
2020–	Zamalek	1	(0)
Medal record
Representing Egypt
U-23 Africa Cup of Nations
Runner-up	Morocco 2023	U-23 Team
- * Club domestic league appearances and goals as of 23:14, 22 August 2020 (UTC)

Hatem Mohamed (born 26 October 2001) is an Egyptian professional footballer who plays as a defender for Egyptian Premier League club Zamalek.

== Career statistics ==
=== Club ===
As of 22 August 2020.

Club	Season	League			Cup		Continental		Other		Total	
Club	Season	Division	Apps	Goals	Apps	Goals	Apps	Goals	Apps	Goals	Apps	Goals
Zamalek	2019–20	Egyptian Premier League	1	0	0	0	0	0	0	0	1	0
Career total			1	0	0	0	0	0	0	0	1	0
