= Ahmed Madbouly =

Egyptian footballer (born 1994)

Personal information
- Full name: Ahmed Ali AbdelRahman Madbouly
- Date of birth: 20 November 1994 (age 31)
- Place of birth: El Badari, Assyut, Egypt
- Position: Winger

Team information
- Current team: Ismaily
- Number: 21

Senior career*
Years	Team	Apps	(Gls)
2015 - 2016	Al Maragha		
2016–2017	Al Nasr Lel Taa'den	0	(1)
2017–2019	Zamalek	1	(5)
2019–23	Ismaily	103	(7)
2023-	National Bank of Egypt SC	55	(3)

International career^{‡}
2017	Egypt	1	(0)
- * Club domestic league appearances and goals as of 11/8/25 @ 16:00(AEST) ‡ National team caps and goals as of 11/8/25 @ 16:00(AEST)

Ahmed Madbouly is an Egyptian footballer who plays for Egyptian Premier League side Ismaily as a winger.

== Honours ==
Zamalek SC

- Egypt Cup: 2017–18
- Saudi-Egyptian Super Cup: 2018
- CAF Confederation Cup : 2018–19
