= Hossam Ashraf =

Egyptian footballer (born 2001)

Personal information
- Full name: Hossam Ashraf
- Date of birth: 20 June 2001 (age 25)
- Height: 1.80 m (5 ft 11 in)
- Position: Forward

Team information
- Current team: Smouha SC

Youth career
- –2020: Zamalek Baladiyat El Mahalla SC

Senior career*
Years	Team	Apps	(Gls)
2020–	Zamalek	11	(2)
2023–2023	→ National Bank of Egypt SC (loan)	0	(0)
2023–2024	→ Baladiyat El Mahalla SC (loan)	32	(14)
2025–	→ Smouha SC (loan)		
- * Club domestic league appearances and goals

Hossam Ashraf (Arabic: حسام اشرف; born 20 June 2001) is an Egyptian professional footballer who plays as a forward for Egyptian Premier League side Smouha on loan from Zamalek.

== Career statistics ==
As of match played 31 July 2024

Appearances and goals by club, season and competition
Club	Season	League			Egypt Cup		Continental		Other		Total		
Club	Season	Division	Apps	Goals	Apps	Goals	Apps	Goals	Apps	Goals	Apps	Goals	
Zamalek	2019–20	EPL	8	1	0	0	0	0	0	0	8	1	
Zamalek	2020–21	EPL	0	0	0	0	1 (Note: Appearances in CAF Champions League)	0	0	0	1	0	
Zamalek	2021–22	EPL	2	1	0	0	0	0	0	0	2	1	
Zamalek	2022–23	EPL	1	0	0	0	2	0	0	0	3	0	
Zamalek	Career total	EPL		11	2	0	0	3	0	0	0	14	2

== Honours ==
Zamalek

- Egypt Cup: 2024–25
- CAF Super Cup: 2024
