= Muhammad Tarek =

Egyptian footballer (born 20 April 2002)

Personal information
- Full name: Muhammad Tarek
- Date of birth: 20 April 2002 (age 24)
- Height: 1.80 m (5 ft 11 in)

Team information
- Current team: Zamalek
- Number: 27

Youth career
- –2021: Zamalek

Senior career*
Years	Team	Apps	(Gls)
2021–	Zamalek	2	(0)

International career
	Egypt U20	0	(0)
- * Club domestic league appearances and goals

Muhammad Tarek (Arabic: محمد طارق; born 20 April 2002) is an Egyptian professional footballer who plays as a defender for Egyptian Premier League club Zamalek.
