= Mohamed Khoudary =

Egyptian footballer (born 2002)

Personal information
- Full name: Mohamed Khoudary
- Date of birth: 4 April 2002 (age 24)
- Position: Midfielder

Team information
- Current team: Zamalek
- Number: 53

Youth career
- –2022: Zamalek

Senior career*
Years	Team	Apps	(Gls)
2022–	Zamalek	1	(0)

International career
	Egypt U20	0	(0)
- * Club domestic league appearances and goals

Mohamed Khoudary (Arabic: محمد خضري; born 4 April 2002) is an Egyptian professional footballer who plays as a midfielder for Egyptian Premier League club Zamalek.
