= Mostafa El Zenary =

Egyptian footballer (born 1999)

Mostafa Al Zenary
Personal information
- Date of birth: 9 April 1999 (age 27)
- Height: 1.80 m (5 ft 11 in)
- Position: Centre-back

Team information
- Current team: Zamalek
- Number: 20

Senior career*
Years	Team	Apps	(Gls)
2018–2022	Tala'ea El Gaish	39	(1)
2019–2020	→ Haras El Hodoud (loan)	16	(0)
2021–2021	→ Ismaily (loan)	6	(0)
2022–	Zamalek	62	(0)
2025–2026	→ National Bank of Egypt SC (loan)	18	(1)
- * Club domestic league appearances and goals

Mostafa Al Zenary (Arabic: مصطفى الزناري; born 9 April 1999) is an Egyptian professional footballer who plays as a centre-back for Egyptian Premier League club Zamalek.

== Honours ==
Zamalek

- Egypt Cup: 2025
- CAF Confederation Cup: 2023–24
- CAF Super Cup: 2024
