= Amr El Sisi =

Egyptian footballer (born 1994)

Personal information
- Full name: Amr Emad Naguib
- Date of birth: 18 May 1994 (age 32)
- Position: Midfielder

Team information
- Current team: Smouha
- Number: 7

Youth career
- Nogoom FC

Senior career*
Years	Team	Apps	(Gls)
2018-2019	Nogoom FC	30	(0)
2019–2022	Tala'ea El Gaish	90	(3)
2022–2024	Zamalek	25	(2)
2024–2025	Modern Sport FC	22	(0)
2024–	Smouha	22	(0)
- * Club domestic league appearances and goals

Amr Emad Naguib (Arabic: عمرو السيسي; born 18 May 1994), known as Amr El Sisi, is an Egyptian professional footballer who plays as a midfielder for Egyptian Premier League club Smouha.
