= Mahmoud Hamdy =

Egyptian footballer (born 1995)

Mahmoud Hamdy محمود حمدي
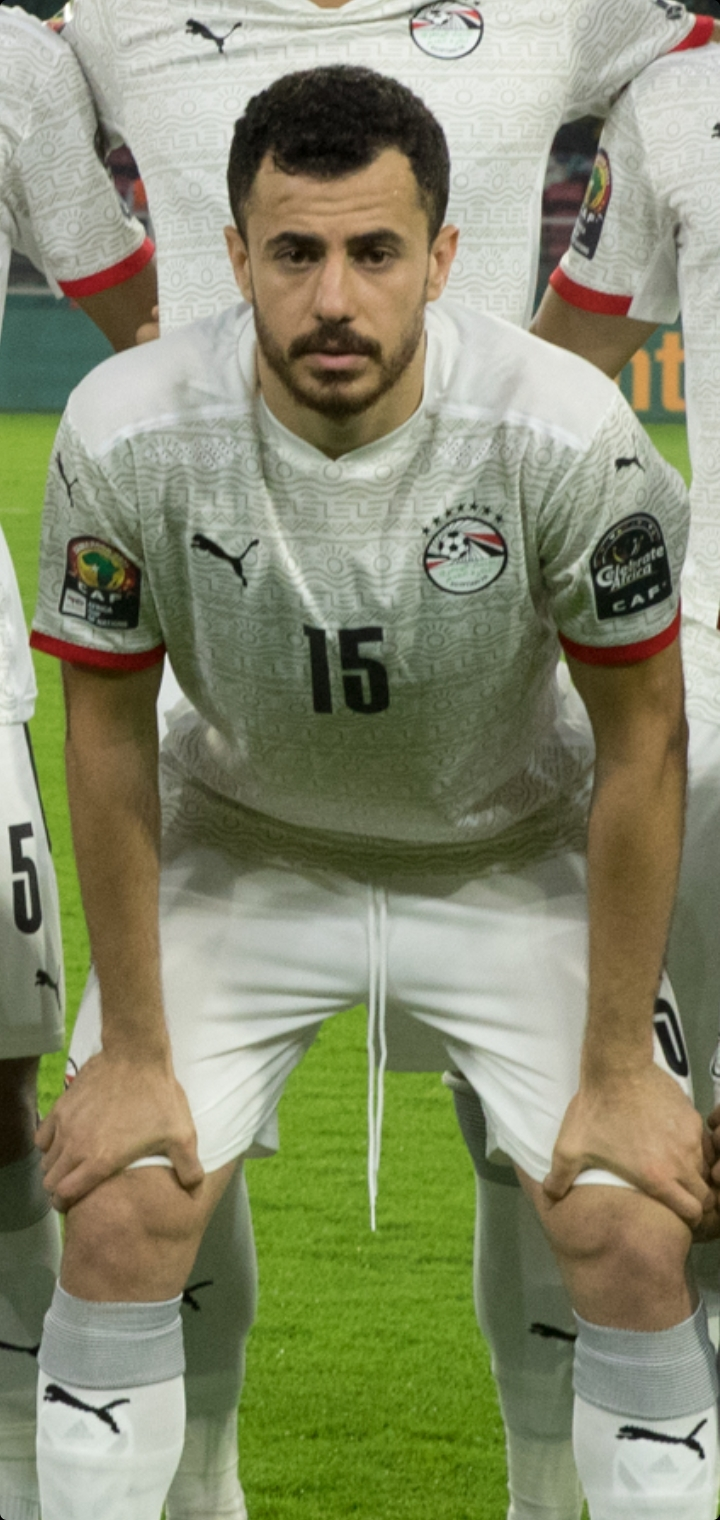
- El-Wensh with Egypt at the 2021 Africa Cup of Nations

Personal information
- Full name: Mahmoud Hamdy Mahmoud Hamouda Attia
- Date of birth: 1 June 1995 (age 31)
- Place of birth: Benha, Egypt
- Height: 1.80 m (5 ft 11 in)
- Position: Centre-back

Team information
- Current team: Zamalek
- Number: 28

Senior career*
Years	Team	Apps	(Gls)
2014–2016	Tala'ea El-Gaish	66	(1)
2016–	Zamalek	153	(7)

International career^{‡}
2021	Egypt Olympic (O.P.)	4	(0)
2018–2022	Egypt	27	(2)
Medal record
Representing Egypt
Men's football
Africa Cup of Nations
Runner-up	2021 Cameroon
- * Club domestic league appearances and goals as of 13 May 2023 ‡ National team caps and goals as of 23 September2025

Mahmoud Hamdy Mahmoud Hamouda Attia (Arabic: محمود حمدي محمود حمودة عطية; born 1 June 1995), also known as El-Wensh (Arabic: الونش), is an Egyptian professional footballer who plays as a centre-back for Egyptian Premier League club Zamalek.

In May 2018 he was named in Egypt's preliminary squad for the 2018 FIFA World Cup in Russia.

== Career statistics ==
Statistics accurate as of match played 23 September 2022.

Egypt
Year	Apps	Goals
2018	1	0
2019	1	0
2020	2	1
2021	14	1
2022	9	0
Total	27	2

Scores and results list Egypt's goal tally first. Score column indicates score after each Hamdy goal.

#	Date	Venue	Opponent	Score	Result	Competition
1.	14 November 2020	Cairo International Stadium, Cairo, Egypt	Togo	1–0	1–0	2021 Africa Cup of Nations qualification
2.	4 December 2021	Stadium 974, Doha, Qatar	Sudan	3–0	5–0	2021 FIFA Arab Cup

== Honours ==
Zamalek

- Egyptian Premier League: 2020–21, 2021–22, 2025–26
- Egypt Cup: 2017–18, 2018–19, 2020–21, 2024–25
- Egyptian Super Cup: 2016, 2020
- CAF Confederation Cup: 2018–19, 2023–24
- CAF Super Cup: 2020, 2024
- Saudi-Egyptian Super Cup: 2018
