= Mostafa Shalaby =

Egyptian footballer (born 1994)

Personal information
- Date of birth: 1 September 1994 (age 32)
- Height: 1.86 m (6 ft 1 in)
- Position: Forward

Team information
- Current team: National Bank FC
- Number: 11

Senior career*
Years	Team	Apps	(Gls)
2014–2020	Asyut Petroleum	98	(18)
2020–2022	ENPPI	58	(12)
2022–2025	Zamalek	65	(9)
2025-	National Bank	25	(2)

International career
2024	Egypt	1	(0)
- * Club domestic league appearances and goals

Mostafa Shalaby (Arabic: مصطفى شلبي; born 1 September 1994) is an Egyptian professional footballer who plays as a forward for Egyptian Premier League club National Bank and the Egypt national team. Shalaby signed for Zamalek coming from ENPPI SC in the summer transfers of 2022–23 season.

== Honours ==
Zamalek

- Egypt Cup: 2025
- CAF Confederation Cup: 2023–24
- CAF Super Cup: 2024

== International career ==
Shalaby made his debut for the senior Egypt national team on 26 March 2024 in a friendly against Croatia.
