= Yaw Annor =

Togolese footballer (born 1997)

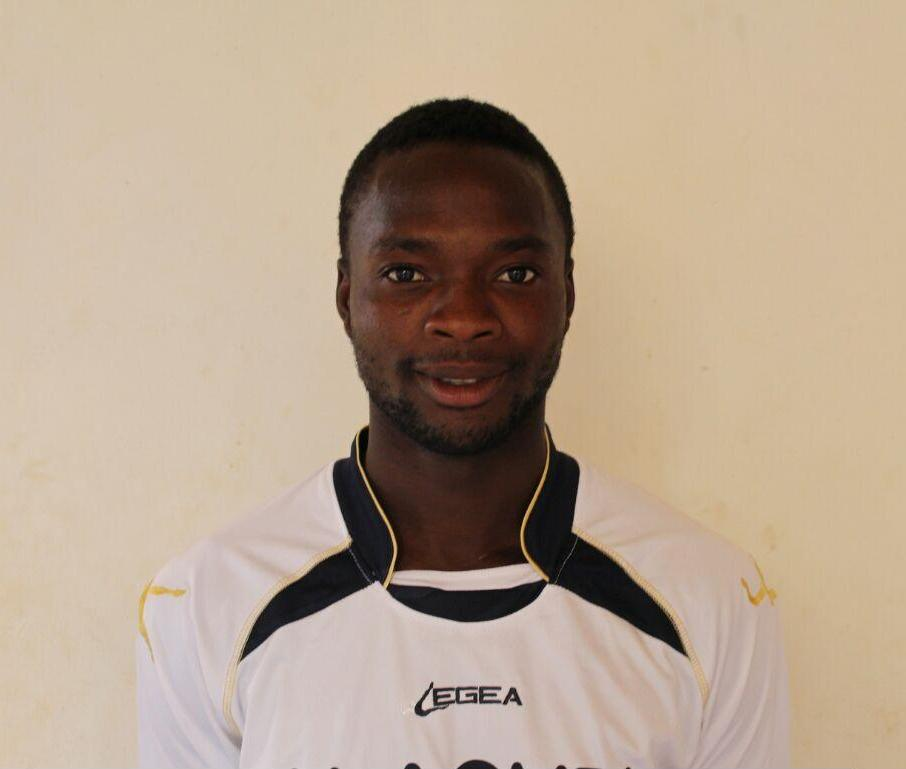

Personal information
- Full name: Yaw Annor
- Date of birth: 3 December 1997 (age 28)
- Place of birth: Ho, Ghana
- Height: 1.79 m (5 ft 10 in)
- Position: Winger

Team information
- Current team: National Bank of Egypt
- Number: 30

Youth career
- 2011–2014: Bechem United

Senior career*
Years	Team	Apps	(Gls)
2014–2017	Bechem United	40	(10)
2017–2020	CF Fuenlabrada	30	(3)
2018–2019	Burgos CF	20	(2)
2019–2020	Bechem United	13	(0)
2020–2022	Ashanti Gold	53	(30)
2022–2024	Ismaily	37	(10)
2024–	National Bank of Egypt	54	(18)

International career^{‡}
2013	Ghana U17	4	(1)
2023–	Togo	8	(2)
- * Club domestic league appearances and goals as of 21 December 2025 ‡ National team caps and goals as of 19:22, 17 November 2024 (UTC)

Yaw Annor (born 3 December 1997) is a Togolese professional footballer who plays as a winger for Egypt Premier League side National Bank of Egypt. Born in Ghana, he plays for the Togo national team.

== Club career ==
=== Early life and career ===
Annor was born on 3 December 1997 in Ho, the capital town of the Volta Region of Ghana. He began his career with junior side of Ghana Premier League side Bechem United until he was promoted to the senior side in 2015.

=== Bechem United ===
In 2014–2015, Annor was promoted to the senior side of Bechem United by head coach Tom Strand who was impressed after watching him train with the youth team. He became a key player for the club from 2015 to 2017. In the 2015 season, he scored 5 goals in the league. The most notable amongst those goals was on the final game of the season, when he scored the first goal in a match against BA United. His goal inspired Bechem to a 4–1 victory over the Sunyani-based side which pushed them from their initial relegation spot–14th position to the 10th position to avoid being relegated to the Division One League.

In 2016, he helped the club win the Ghanaian FA Cup. He scored a brace in the final match against Okwawu United on 4 September 2016 to secure 2–1 victory to clinch the trophy, for the first time in the club's history. In the 2016 Ghanaian Premier League, he made 27 league appearances and scored 4 goals to help the Bechem United place 6th at the end of the season. At the end of the season, he won the Ghana FA Cup top scorer award with 4 goals and was adjudged FA Cup player of the year after his impressive display in the tournament. He beat off Latif Blessing of Liberty Professionals, Akoto Danso of Okwahu United and West African Football Academy's midfielder Gideon Waja to win the award. He played the club's debut African continental championship match on 12 February 2017, helping the club secure their first ever victory in a continental match.

=== CF Fuenlabrada ===
At the end of the 2016 season, Annor moved to Spain and joined Segunda División B side CF Fuenlabrada in March 2017 on a three-year deal. in his first season, he featured in 9 league matches and scored 2 goals before the season came to an end. On 1 November 2017, he scored in the 24th minute to help salvage a win for Fuenlabrada in a match against CD Toledo, he played 70 minutes of the match as they won by 4–3. He featured in both legs of their 2017–18 Copa del Rey matches against Real Madrid. On 26 October 2017, he featured in the first leg coming on in the 53rd minute as a substitute for Juan Quero, whilst on 28 November 2017, he started the second leg match and played 78 minutes before being substituted for Juan Quero. Fuenlabrada held Real Madrid to a 2–2 draw but lost on 4–2 aggregate. At the end of his stay with the club he had made 31 league appearances and netted three goals.

=== Burgos (loan) ===
Annor was left out of the pre-season squad for CF Fuenlabrada and sent on a season long loan to Burgos CF ahaed of the 2018–19 Segunda División B season. He made 20 league appearances and scored 2 goals during his stay at the club.

=== Return to Bechem United ===
After his contract with Fuenlabrada, in 2019 he returned and signed a contract with his former club Bechem United after interests from Kumasi Asante Kotoko and Legon Cities. Before joining his old club he underwent trials at Asante Kotoko, however the then management of the club headed by club coach Kjetil Zachariassen refused to offer him a contract. That season, 2019–20 Ghana Premier League season, he featured in 13 league matches as the league was suspended and later cancelled due to the COVID-19 pandemic.

The club CEO of Bechem United, Nana Kwasi Darlington confirmed in March 2020 that five key players including Annor would be sold before the next season starts. Both Asante Kotoko and Legon Cities ignited their interests in signing the winger. Asante Kotoko under their new coach Maxwell Konadu, once again showed interest in signing him.

" I want to apologize sincerely to coach Maxwell Konadu for opting to sign for Ashantigold, it wasn’t my fault to do this. He needed me badly at Kotoko but I’m sorry for disappointing him...Though the deal couldn’t go through I’m confident of succeeding at Ashantigold and I’m hopeful I will return to Asante Kotoko.”

— Annor on snubbing Asante Kotoko.

=== Ashanti Gold ===
In July 2020, Annor signed for Obuasi-based club Ashanti Gold on a three-year as the club took steps to bolster their squad towards the CAF Confederations Cup campaign and the 2020–21 Ghana Premier League season. He snubbed Asante Kotoko and signed for the Miners causing a controversy within the media in Ghana. He later apologised to the then coach of Kotoko Maxwell Konadu for snubbing them and stated that he was confident of succeeding at Ashanti Gold.

== International career ==
Annor is a former youth international for Ghana. He featured for the Ghana national under-17 football team in 2013. Since he is of Togolese descent, he is also available to represent Togo. He accepted a call-up to Togo national team in November 2023, subsequently debuted for Togo in the 2026 FIFA World Cup qualification fixture against Senegal.

== Career statistics ==
=== International ===
As of match played 17 November 2024

Appearances and goals by national team and year
National team	Year	Apps	Goals
Togo	2022	1	0
Togo	2023	1	0
Togo	2024	6	2
Total		8	2

Scores and results list Togo's goal tally first, score column indicates score after each Annor goal.

List of international goals scored by Yaw Annor
No.	Date	Venue	Opponent	Score	Result	Competition
1	17 November 2024	Stade de Kégué, Lomé, Togo	Equatorial Guinea	1–0	3–0	2025 Africa Cup of Nations qualification
2	17 November 2024	Stade de Kégué, Lomé, Togo	Equatorial Guinea	3–0	3–0	2025 Africa Cup of Nations qualification

== Honours ==
Bechem United

- Ghanaian FA Cup: 2016

Individual

- Ghana Football Awards Home-based Player of Year: 2021–22
- Ghana Football Awards Ghana Premier League Goal King: 2021–22
- Ghana Premier League Top scorer: 2021–22
- Ghana Premier League Player of the month: April 2022
- Ghana FA Cup Player of the year: 2016
- Ghana FA Cup Top Goal Scorer: 2016
- Ghana FA Cup Goal of the season: 2016

== See also ==
- Bechem United F.C.
