= Sayed Abdallah =

Egyptian footballer (born 2000)

Personal information
- Full name: Sayed Mohamed Abdallah
- Date of birth: 12 January 2000 (age 26)
- Place of birth: Giza, Egypt
- Height: 1.80 m (5 ft 11 in)
- Position: Right winger

Team information
- Current team: National Bank
- Number: 10

Senior career*
Years	Team	Apps	(Gls)
2019–2021	Zamalek U21		
2019	→ Ubon United (loan)		
2021–2025	Zamalek	44	(1)
2024–2025	→ National Bank (loan)	10	(0)
2025–	National Bank	25	(1)
- * Club domestic league appearances and goals

Sayed Abdallah (Arabic: سَيِّد عَبْد الله; born 12 January 2000), also known as Sayed Neymar, is an Egyptian professional footballer who plays as a midfielder for Egyptian Premier League club National Bank of Egypt SC.

== Honours ==
=== Club ===
Zamalek SC

- Egyptian Premier League: 2021–22
- Egypt Cup: 2021
- CAF Confederation Cup: 2023–24
