= Osama Faisal =

Egyptian footballer (born 2001)

Osama Faisal أُسَامَة فَيْصَل
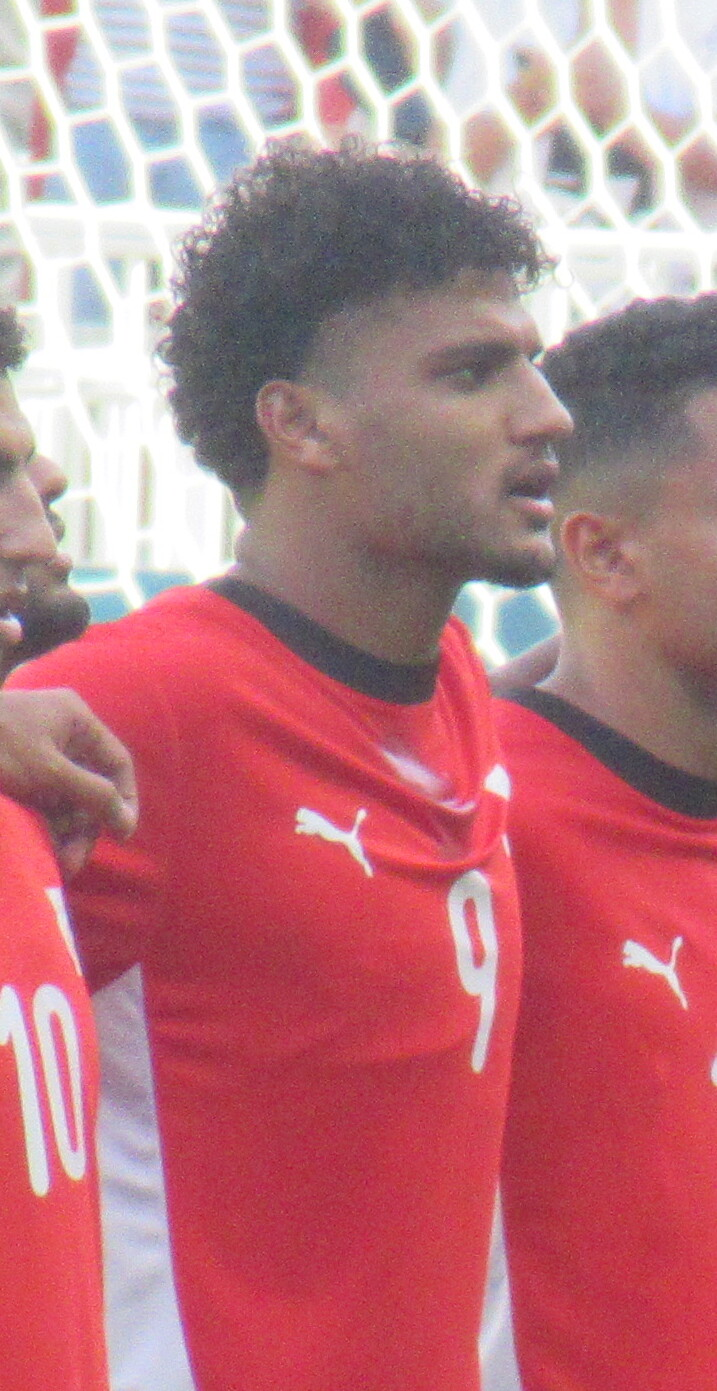
- Faisal lining up for Egypt Olympic at the 2024 Summer Olympics

Personal information
- Full name: Osama Faisal Ahmed Abdelhady Eltraawy
- Date of birth: 1 January 2001 (age 25)
- Place of birth: Egypt
- Height: 1.80 m (5 ft 11 in)
- Position: Forward

Team information
- Current team: National Bank of Egypt SC
- Number: 9

Youth career
- –2020: Zamalek

Senior career*
Years	Team	Apps	(Gls)
2019–2021	Zamalek	20	(2)
2021–	National Bank of Egypt SC	110	(26)

International career^{‡}
2022–2024	Egypt U23	20	(3)
2021–	Egypt	9	(0)
Medal record
Representing Egypt
U-23 Africa Cup of Nations
Runner-up	Morocco 2023	U-23 Team
- * Club domestic league appearances and goals ‡ National team caps and goals as of 21 March 2025

Osama Faisal Ahmed Abdelhady Eltraawy (Arabic: أُسَامَة فَيْصَل أَحْمَد عَبْد الْهَادِي الدَّرْعَاوِيّ; born 1 January 2001) is an Egyptian professional footballer who plays as a forward for Egyptian Premier League club National Bank of Egypt SC and the Egypt national team.

== International career ==
On 2 December 2025, Faisal was called up to the Egypt squad for the 2025 Africa Cup of Nations.

== Career statistics ==
=== Club ===
As of 21 May 2021.

Club	Season	League			Cup		Continental		Other		Total	
Club	Season	Division	Apps	Goals	Apps	Goals	Apps	Goals	Apps	Goals	Apps	Goals
Zamalek	2019–20	Egyptian Premier League	9	1	2	1	0	0	0	0	11	2
Zamalek	2020–21	Egyptian Premier League	9	1	0	0	3	0	0	0	12	1
Career total			18	2	2	1	3	0	0	0	23	3
