= Mohamed Abdel Ghani =

Egyptian footballer (born 1993)

Personal information
- Date of birth: 16 July 1993 (age 33)
- Height: 1.75 m (5 ft 9 in)
- Position: Centre-back

Team information
- Current team: National Bank
- Number: 2

Senior career*
Years	Team	Apps	(Gls)
2015–2017	Sohag		
2017–2018	FC Masr		
2018–2024	Zamalek	133	(3)
2024–	National Bank	0	(0)
- * Club domestic league appearances and goals

Mohamed Abdel Ghani (Arabic: محمد عبد الغني, born 16 July 1993) is an Egyptian professional footballer who plays as a centre-back for Egyptian Premier League club National Bank.

== Honours ==
Zamalek

- Egyptian Premier League 2020-21, 2021-22
- Egypt Cup: 2018, 2019, 2021
- Egyptian Super Cup: 2019–20
- Saudi-Egyptian Super Cup: 2018
- CAF Confederation Cup: 2018–19
- CAF Super Cup: 2020
