= 2024 CAF Confederation Cup final =

International football match in Africa

- Event: 2023–24 CAF Confederation Cup
RS Berkane	Zamalek
(Morocco)	(Egypt)
2	2
- 2–2 on aggregate. Zamalek won on away goals.

First leg
RS Berkane	Zamalek
2	1
- Date: 12 May 2024
- Venue: Stade Municipal de Berkane, Berkane
- Referee: Peter Waweru (Kenya)
- Attendance: 10,000
- Weather: Clear weather with a few clouds 20 °C (68 °F); 75% humidity

Second leg
Zamalek	RS Berkane
1	0
- Date: 19 May 2024
- Venue: Cairo International Stadium, Cairo
- Referee: Issa Sy (Senegal)
- Attendance: 52,000
- Weather: Clear weather with a few clouds 35 °C (95 °F); 24% humidity

The 2024 CAF Confederation Cup final were the final matches of the 2023–24 CAF Confederation Cup, the 21st season of the CAF Confederation Cup and the 49th season overall of Africa's secondary club football competition organized by the Confederation of African Football (CAF).

== Teams ==
Team	Zone	Previous finals appearances (bold indicates winners)
(Morocco) RS Berkane	UNAF (North Africa)	3 (2019, **2020**, **2022**)
(Egypt) Zamalek	UNAF (North Africa)	1 (**2019**)

== Venues ==
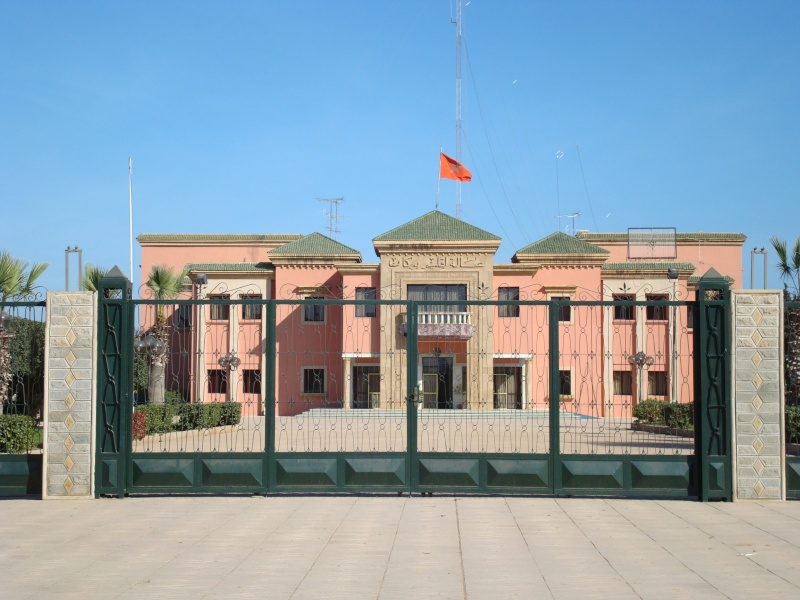
Berkane, Morocco, hosted the first leg.

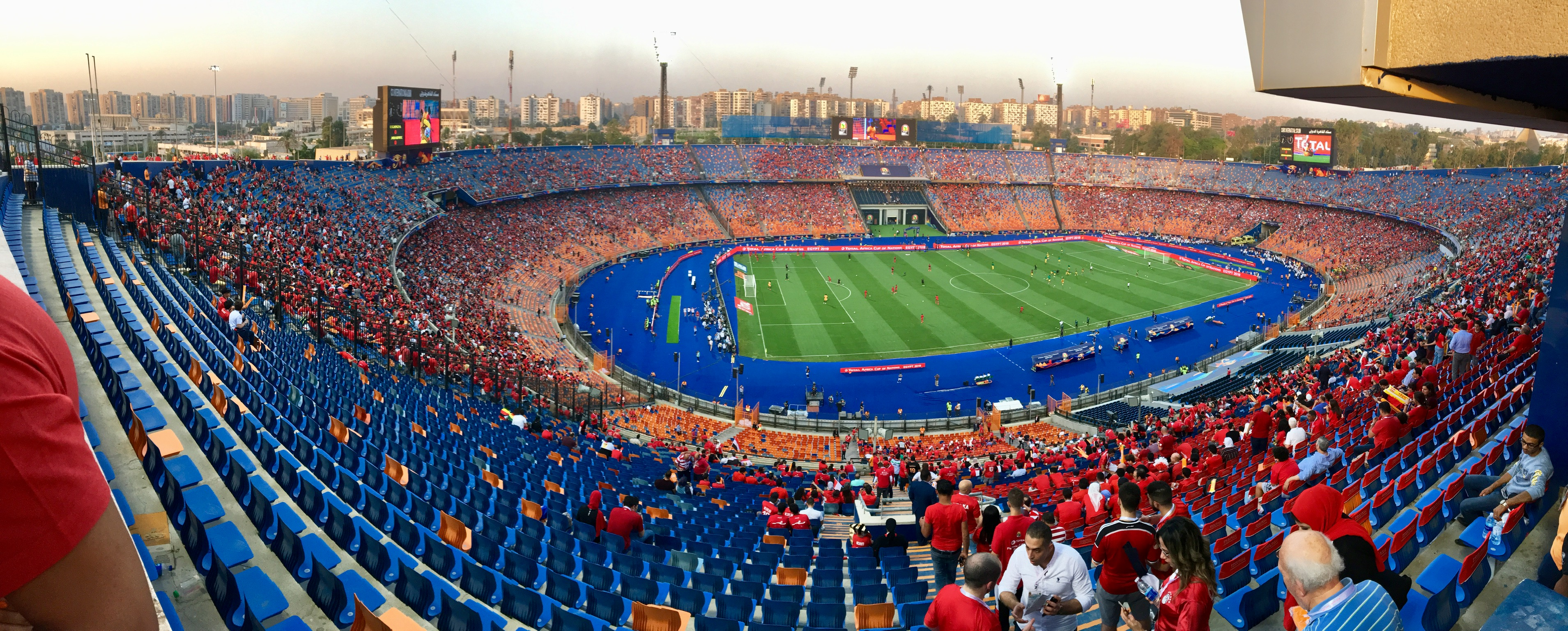
Cairo International Stadium in Cairo, Egypt, hosted the second leg.

== Road to the final ==
Note: In all results below, the score of the finalist is given first (H: home; A: away).

(Morocco) RS Berkane				Round	(Egypt) Zamalek			
Opponent	Agg	1st leg	2nd leg	Qualifying rounds	Opponent	Agg	1st leg	2nd leg
Bye				First round	Bye			
(Nigeria) Bendel Insurance	3–2	2–2 (A)	1–0 (H)	Second round	(Djibouti) Arta Solar	4–3	0–2 (A)	4–1 (H)
Opponent	Result			Group stage	Opponent	Result		
(South Africa) Sekhukhune United	2–0 (H)			Matchday 1	(Libya) Abu Salim	1–0 (H)		
(Mali) Stade Malien	2–1 (A)			Matchday 2	(Guinea) Académie SOAR	4–0 (A)		
(Republic of the Congo) Diables Noirs	2–0 (H)			Matchday 3	(Angola) Sagrada Esperança	1–0 (H)		
(Republic of the Congo) Diables Noirs	1–1 (A)			Matchday 4	(Angola) Sagrada Esperança	0–0 (A)		
(South Africa) Sekhukhune United	0–0 (A)			Matchday 5	(Libya) Abu Salim	2–1 (A)		
(Mali) Stade Malien	3–0 (H)			Matchday 6	(Guinea) Académie SOAR	3–0 (awd.) (H) (Note: CAF awarded Zamalek a 3–0 win after Académie SOAR failed to travel to Egypt.)		
**Group D winners**: Pos / Team / Pld / Pts; **1** / (Morocco) RS Berkane / **6** / **14**; 2 / (Mali) Stade Malien / 6 / **10**; 3 / (South Africa) Sekhukhune United / 6 / **6**; 4 / (Republic of the Congo) Diables Noirs / 6 / **2**; Source: CAF				Final standings	**Group B winners**: Pos / Team / Pld / Pts; **1** / (Egypt) Zamalek / **6** / **16**; 2 / (Libya) Abu Salim / 6 / **9**; 3 / (Angola) Sagrada Esperança / 6 / **8**; 4 / (Guinea) Académie SOAR / 6 / **1**; Source: CAF			
Opponent	Agg	1st leg	2nd leg	Knockout stage	Opponent	Agg	1st leg	2nd leg
(Libya) Abu Salim	3–2	0–0 (A)	3–2 (H)	Quarter-finals	(Egypt) Modern Future	3–2	2–1 (A)	1–1 (H)
(Algeria) USM Alger	6–0 (w/o)	3–0 (awd.) (A) (Note: Upon arriving to Algeria, RS Berkane official kits were seized by Algerian authorities, who refused to allow them to wear it in the match against USM Alger, due to the shirts featuring a map of Morocco that includes Western Sahara, which is a disputed territory that Morocco claims to be part of their land, while Algeria recognize it as part of the Sahrawi Arab Democratic Republic. The match was cancelled as a result. On 24 April, CAF awarded RS Berkane a 3–0 win.)	3–0 (awd.) (H) (Note: RS Berkane won on walkover after USM Alger withdrew from the match, despite arriving to the stadium. The match was cancelled as a result, and RS Berkane were awarded a 3–0 win on 1 May 2024.)	Semi-finals	(Ghana) Dreams F.C.	3–0	0–0 (H)	3–0 (A)

== Format ==
The final was played on a home-and-away two-legged basis.

If the aggregate score was tied after the second leg, the away goals rule was applied, and if still equal, extra time was played, and a penalty shoot-out was used to determine the winner.

== Matches ==
=== First leg ===
==== Details ====
12 May 2024
20:00 UTC+1

RS Berkane (Morocco)	2–1	(Egypt) Zamalek
Dayo 13' (pen.); Tahif 32'	Report	Jaziri 46'

Stade Municipal de Berkane, Berkane
Attendance: 10,000
Referee: Peter Waweru (Kenya)

**RS Berkane**	**Zamalek**

GK	12	(Morocco) Hamza Hamiani
DF	4	(Burkina Faso) Issoufou Dayo (c)
DF	13	(Morocco) Adil Tahif		(substituted off) 66'
DF	15	(Morocco) Abdelhak Assal
DF	19	(Morocco) Hamza El Moussaoui	(yellow card) 90+4'
MF	8	(Morocco) Ayoub Khairi
MF	17	(Morocco) Yassine Labhiri
FW	7	(Morocco) Youssef El Fahli		(substituted off) 77'
FW	10	(Morocco) Mohamed El Mourabit		(substituted off) 77'
FW	21	(Morocco) Youssef Mehri
FW	30	(Senegal) Paul Bassène		(substituted off) 77'
Substitutes:
GK	22	(Morocco) Amine El Ouaad
DF	2	(Morocco) Amine El Maswab
DF	29	(Morocco) Hamza Semmoumy		(substituted on) 66'
MF	5	(Morocco) Omar Arjoune
MF	6	(Senegal) Mamadou Lamine Camara		(substituted on) 77'
MF	23	(Ivory Coast) Claude Gnolou
MF	35	(Morocco) Reda Hajji
FW	18	(Democratic Republic of the Congo) Tuisila Kisinda		(substituted on) 77'
FW	39	(Burkina Faso) Djibril Ouattara		(substituted on) 77'
Manager:
(Tunisia) Mouin Chaâbani

GK	1	(Egypt) Mohamed Awad
DF	2	(Egypt) Hossam Abdel Maguid
DF	4	(Egypt) Omar Gaber (c)
DF	13	(Egypt) Ahmed Fatouh
DF	24	(Tunisia) Hamza Mathlouthi
MF	8	(Egypt) Nabil Emad Donga		(substituted off) 90+3'
MF	21	(Egypt) Ahmed Hamdi
MF	25	(Egypt) Ahmed Sayed Zizo
MF	39	(Egypt) Mohamed Shehata
FW	9	(Benin) Samson Akinyoola		(substituted off) 69'
FW	30	(Tunisia) Seifeddine Jaziri	(yellow card) 90+2'
Substitutes:
GK	16	(Egypt) Mohamed Sobhy
DF	31	(Palestine) Yaser Hamed
MF	14	(Egypt) Youssef Obama
MF	17	(Uganda) Travis Mutyaba
MF	18	(Egypt) Sayed Abdallah
MF	33	(Egypt) Ziad Kamal
MF	38	(Egypt) Mohab Yaser
FW	7	(Senegal) Ibrahima Ndiaye	(yellow card) 88'	(substituted on) 69'
FW	19	(Egypt) Nasser Mansi		(substituted on) 90+3'
Manager:
(Portugal) José Gomes

Assistant referees:
Gilbert Cheruiyot (Kenya)
Stephen Yiembe (Kenya)
Fourth official:
Pacifique Ndabihawenimana (Burundi)
Video assistant referee:
Haythem Guirat (Tunisia)
Assistant video assistant referees:
Abongile Tom (South Africa)
Diana Chikotesha (Zambia)

**Match rules**
- 90 minutes.
- Nine named substitutes, of which up to five may be used. (Note: Each team was only given three opportunities to make substitutions, excluding substitutions made at half-time.)

==== Statistics ====
First half
Statistic	RS Berkane	Zamalek
Goals scored	2	0
Total shots	5	1
Shots on target	2	1
Saves	1	0
Ball possession	30%	70%
Corner kicks	2	4
Offsides	0	0
Yellow cards	0	0
Red cards	0	0

Second half
Statistic	RS Berkane	Zamalek
Goals scored	0	1
Total shots	3	3
Shots on target	1	1
Saves	0	1
Ball possession	50%	50%
Corner kicks	1	0
Offsides	1	1
Yellow cards	1	2
Red cards	0	0

Overall
Statistic	RS Berkane	Zamalek
Goals scored	2	1
Total shots	8	4
Shots on target	3	2
Saves	1	1
Ball possession	40%	60%
Corner kicks	3	4
Offsides	1	1
Yellow cards	1	2
Red cards	0	0

=== Second leg ===
==== Details ====
19 May 2024
20:00 UTC+3

Zamalek (Egypt)	1–0	(Morocco) RS Berkane
Hamdi 23'	Report

Cairo International Stadium, Cairo
Attendance: 52,000
Referee: Issa Sy (Senegal)

**Zamalek**	**RS Berkane**

GK	1	(Egypt) Mohamed Awad	(yellow card) 83'
DF	2	(Egypt) Hossam Abdel Maguid
DF	4	(Egypt) Omar Gaber (c)
DF	13	(Egypt) Ahmed Fatouh	(yellow card) 79'
DF	24	(Tunisia) Hamza Mathlouthi	(yellow card) 74'
MF	8	(Egypt) Nabil Emad Donga
MF	21	(Egypt) Ahmed Hamdi		(substituted off) 41'
MF	25	(Egypt) Ahmed Sayed Zizo
MF	39	(Egypt) Mohamed Shehata	(yellow card) 56'	(substituted off) 60'
FW	7	(Senegal) Ibrahima Ndiaye		(substituted off) 69'
FW	30	(Tunisia) Seifeddine Jaziri
Substitutes:
GK	16	(Egypt) Mohamed Sobhy
DF	31	(Palestine) Yaser Hamed
MF	14	(Egypt) Youssef Obama		(substituted on) 41'
MF	18	(Egypt) Sayed Abdallah
MF	33	(Egypt) Ziad Kamal		(substituted on) 60'
MF	38	(Egypt) Mohab Yaser
FW	9	(Benin) Samson Akinyoola
FW	11	(Egypt) Mostafa Shalaby		(substituted on) 69'
FW	19	(Egypt) Nasser Mansi
Manager:
(Portugal) José Gomes

GK	12	(Morocco) Hamza Hamiani
DF	4	(Burkina Faso) Issoufou Dayo (c)	(yellow card) 86'
DF	13	(Morocco) Adil Tahif		(substituted off) 54'
DF	15	(Morocco) Abdelhak Assal
DF	19	(Morocco) Hamza El Moussaoui	(red card) 90+2'
MF	8	(Morocco) Ayoub Khairi
MF	17	(Morocco) Yassine Labhiri
FW	7	(Morocco) Youssef El Fahli	(yellow card) 45+6'	(substituted off) 78'
FW	10	(Morocco) Mohamed El Mourabit		(substituted off) 66'
FW	21	(Morocco) Youssef Mehri		(substituted off) 66'
FW	30	(Senegal) Paul Bassène		(substituted off) 77'
Substitutes:
GK	22	(Morocco) Amine El Ouaad
DF	2	(Morocco) Amine El Maswab
DF	29	(Morocco) Hamza Semmoumy	(yellow card) 55'	(substituted on) 54'
MF	6	(Senegal) Mamadou Lamine Camara
MF	23	(Ivory Coast) Claude Gnolou
MF	35	(Morocco) Reda Hajji		(substituted on) 66'
FW	11	(Morocco) Youssef Zghoudi		(substituted on) 77'
FW	18	(Democratic Republic of the Congo) Tuisila Kisinda		(substituted on) 78'
FW	39	(Burkina Faso) Djibril Ouattara		(substituted on) 66'
Manager:
(Tunisia) Mouin Chaâbani

Assistant referees:
Djibril Camara (Senegal)
Nouha Bangoura (Senegal)
Fourth official:
Omar Artan (Somalia)
Video assistant referee:
Pierre Atcho (Gabon)
Assistant video assistant referees:
Maria Rivet (Mauritius)
Khalil Hassani (Tunisia)

**Match rules**
- 90 minutes.
- Penalty shoot-out if tied on aggregate and away goals.
- Nine named substitutes, of which up to five may be used.

==== Statistics ====
First half
Statistic	Zamalek	RS Berkane
Goals scored	1	0
Total shots	10	5
Shots on target	3	0
Saves	0	2
Ball possession	59%	41%
Corner kicks	3	4
Offsides	2	1
Yellow cards	0	1
Red cards	0	0

Second half
Statistic	Zamalek	RS Berkane
Goals scored	0	0
Total shots	6	10
Shots on target	1	0
Saves	0	1
Ball possession	51%	49%
Corner kicks	0	0
Offsides	1	0
Yellow cards	4	2
Red cards	0	0

Overall
Statistic	Zamalek	RS Berkane
Goals scored	1	0
Total shots	16	15
Shots on target	4	0
Saves	0	3
Ball possession	55%	45%
Corner kicks	3	4
Offsides	3	1
Yellow cards	4	3
Red cards	0	0

== See also ==
- 2024 CAF Champions League final
- 2024 CAF Super Cup
