= 2023–24 Zamalek SC season =

Zamalek SC
2023–24 season
- President: Hussein Labib
- Head coach: Juan Carlos Osorio (until 5 November); Motamed Gamal (caretaker, from 5 November to 1 February); José Gomes (from 1 February)
- Stadium: Cairo International Stadium
- Egyptian Premier League: 3rd
- 2022–23 Egypt Cup: Runners-up
- 2023–24 Egypt Cup: Round of 16
- CAF Confederation Cup: Winners
- Arab Club Champions Cup: Group stage
- Top goalscorer: League: Zizo (9); All: Zizo (14)

The 2023–24 Zamalek SC season was the club's 113th season in existence and the 65th consecutive season in the top flight of Egyptian football. In addition to the domestic league, Zamalek participated in this season's editions of the Egypt Cup, the CAF Confederation Cup and the Arab Club Champions Cup. It began on 28 July 2023 with the Arab club competition.

== Players ==
=== First-team squad ===
As of 20 September 2023

Note: Flags indicate national team as defined under FIFA eligibility rules; some limited exceptions apply. Players may hold more than one non-FIFA nationality.

No.	Pos.	Nation	Player
—	GK	EGY	Mohamed Awad
—	GK	EGY	Mohamed Sobhy
—	GK	EGY	Abdelrahman Nafad
—	DF	TUN	Hamza Mathlouthi
—	DF	EGY	Ahmed Abou El Fotouh
—	DF	EGY	Omar Gaber
—	DF	EGY	Mahmoud Alaa
—	DF	EGY	Mohamed Abdel Ghani
—	DF	EGY	Hossam Abdul-Majeed
—	DF	EGY	Mostafa El Zenary
—	DF	EGY	Muhammad Tarek
—	DF	EGY	Mohamed Abdel Shafy
—	DF	EGY	Hatem Sukar
—	DF	EGY	El Wensh
—	MF	EGY	Nabil Emad Dunga

No.	Pos.	Nation	Player
—	MF	EGY	Amr El Sisi
—	MF	EGY	Mohamed Ashraf Roqa
—	MF	EGY	Mohamed Hossam Beso
—	MF	EGY	Youssef Obama
—	MF	EGY	Sayed Abdallah Neymar
—	MF	EGY	Ahmed Abdel Rahim Esho
—	MF	EGY	Shikabala (captain)
—	MF	SEN	Ibrahima Ndiaye
—	MF	EGY	Mostafa Shalaby
—	FW	TUN	Seifeddine Jaziri
—	FW	EGY	Ali Yasser
—	FW	EGY	Ahmed Sayed Zizo
—	FW	EGY	Nasser Mansi
—	FW	BEN	Samson Akinyoola

== Transfers ==
=== In ===
Pos.	Player	Transferred from	Fee	Date	Source
DF	(Egypt) Ahmad Zaki	(Egypt) ZED	Loan return	30 June 2023	
MF	(Egypt) Youssef Obama	(Saudi Arabia) Al-Hazem	Loan return	30 June 2023	
DF	(Egypt) Mahmoud Alaa	(Egypt) Al Ittihad	Loan return	20 July 2023	
DF	(Egypt) Ahmed Ayman Mansour	(Egypt) Tala'ea El Gaish	Loan return	20 July 2023	
DF	(Egypt) Ahmed Eid	(Egypt) ENPPI	Loan return	20 July 2023	
MF	(Egypt) Hamdy Alaa	National Bank of Egypt	Loan return	20 July 2023	
FW	(Egypt) Hossam Ashraf	National Bank of Egypt	Loan return	10 August 2023	
MF	(Egypt) Abdallah El Said	(Egypt) Pyramids	€448,000	31 January 2024	
DF	(Palestine) Yaser Hamed	(India) NorthEast United	Free	5 February 2024	

=== Out ===
Pos.	Player	Transferred to	Fee	Date	Source
MF	(Morocco) Ahmed Belhadji	(Egypt) Aswan	Loan return	20 July 2023	
MF	(Egypt) Youssef Osama	(Egypt) Pyramids	Free	4 August 2023	
MF	(Egypt) Seif Farouk Gaafar	(Egypt) Pyramids	Free	8 August 2023	
DF	(Egypt) Ahmed Eid	(Egypt) Al Masry	Free	15 August 2023	
DF	(Egypt) Ahmed Ayman Mansour	(Egypt) Al Masry	Free	16 August 2023	
FW	(Egypt) Hossam Ashraf	(Egypt) Baladiyat El Mahalla	Loan	30 August 2023	
MF	(Egypt) Maged Hany	(Egypt) Baladiyat El Mahalla	Loan	30 August 2023	
MF	(Egypt) Tarek Alaa	(Egypt) Baladiyat El Mahalla	Loan	3 September 2023	
DF	(Egypt) Mahmoud Shabana	(Egypt) Al Ittihad	€166,000	4 September 2023	
GK	(Egypt) El-Sayed Attia	(Egypt) Al Nasr Lel Taa'den	Free	11 September 2023	
MF	(Egypt) Hamdy Alaa	(Egypt) Smouha	Loan and €120,000	12 September 2023	
GK	(Egypt) Mohamed Nadim	(Egypt) Pharco	Free	14 September 2023	
MF	(Egypt) Mohamed Khodary	(Egypt) Petrojet	Free	16 September 2023	
DF	(Palestine) Yaser Hamed		Contract termination	1 July 2024	

== Pre-season and friendlies ==
Win Draw Loss

Zamalek formally announced that it would take part in a training camp in Heliopolis that started on 4 September 2023.

7 September 2023 Friendly	Zamalek (Egypt)	3–0	(Egypt) El Sekka El Hadid	Cairo
17:00 UTC+3	Mansi 28'; Akinyoola 40', 41'			Stadium: Military Academy Stadium

11 September 2023 Friendly	Zamalek (Egypt)	0–3	(Egypt) Ceramica Cleopatra	Cairo
17:00 UTC+3			Toni 5'; Ibrahim 45'; Ebuka 87'	Stadium: Sub-field of the Air Defense Stadium

26 January 2024 Friendly	Zamalek (Egypt)	2–2 (4–2 p)	(Morocco) Raja CA	Dubai, United Arab Emirates
18:00 UTC+4	El-Wensh 2'; Shikabala 6'		Yousri Bouzok 67' (pen.); Zerhouni 89' (pen.)	Stadium: Al-Maktoum Stadium

28 January 2024 Friendly	Zamalek (Egypt)	3–0	(Saudi Arabia) Al-Ahli	Dubai, United Arab Emirates
20:00 UTC+4				Stadium: Al-Maktoum Stadium

8 February 2024 Friendly	Zamalek (Egypt)	3–1	(Egypt) Zamalek Youth	Cairo
	Jaziri 10', 56'; Ndiaye 40'	Report	Abdoun 34'	Stadium: Zamalek Stadium
Note: Three periods of 30 minutes

23 March 2024 Friendly	Zamalek (Egypt)	2–2	(Egypt) ZED	Cairo
21:30 UTC+2		Report		Stadium: Petrosport Stadium

4 June 2024 Friendly	Zamalek (Egypt)	3–1	(Egypt) Al Nasr	Cairo
		Report		Stadium: Zamalek Stadium

7 June 2024 Friendly	Zamalek (Egypt)	3–3	(Egypt) National Bank	Cairo
				Stadium: Petrosport Stadium

== Competitions ==
=== Overall record ===
Competition	First match	Last match	Starting round	Final position	Record							
Competition	First match	Last match	Starting round	Final position	Pld	W	D	L	GF	GA	GD	Win %
Egyptian Premier League	21 September 2023	17 August 2024	Matchday 1	3rd	34	17	8	9	53	37	+16	50.00
2023–24 Egypt Cup	18 July 2024	21 August 2024	Round of 32	Round of 16	2	1	1	0	6	3	+3	50.00
2022–23 Egypt Cup	8 November 2023	8 March 2024	Semi-finals	Runners-up	2	0	1	1	3	5	−2	0.00
CAF Confederation Cup	16 September 2023	19 May 2024	Second round	Winners	13	8	3	2	20	8	+12	61.54
Arab Club Champions Cup	28 July 2023	3 August 2023	Group stage	Group stage	3	1	1	1	5	2	+3	33.33
Total					54	27	14	13	87	55	+32	50.00

Source: Soccerway

=== Egyptian Premier League ===
==== League table ====
Pos	Team	Pld	W	D	L	GF	GA	GD	Pts	Qualification or relegation
1	Al Ahly (C)	34	27	4	3	75	28	+47	85	Qualification for the Champions League second round (Note: Al Ahly qualified for the Champions League second round by winning the 2023–24 CAF Champions League.)
2	Pyramids	34	24	7	3	62	27	+35	79	Qualification for the Champions League first round
3	Zamalek	34	17	8	9	53	37	+16	56 (Note: Zamalek were deducted three points for refusing to play their away fixture against Al Ahly, scheduled to be played on 25 June 2024.)	Qualification for the Confederation Cup second round (Note: Zamalek qualified for the Confederation Cup second round by winning the 2023–24 CAF Confederation Cup.)
4	Al Masry	34	16	7	11	41	39	+2	55	Qualification for the Confederation Cup second round (Note: The league was not finished by the CAF deadline for associations to submit teams participating in next season's CAF competitions. As a result, Al Masry, who finished the first half of the season at third place (and were also at third place by the time of the draw) qualified for the CAF Confederation Cup.)
5	Modern Future	34	14	12	8	40	28	+12	54 (Note: Head-to-head points: Modern Future 4, Smouha 1.)	

Source: Soccerway
Rules for classification: 1) Points; 2) Head-to-head points; 3) Head-to-head goal difference; 4) Goal difference; 5) Goals scored; 6) Play-off tie.
(Note: Head-to-head records are used for final standings only)
(C) Champions

==== Results summary ====
Overall								Home						Away					
Pld	W	D	L	GF	GA	GD	Pts	W	D	L	GF	GA	GD	W	D	L	GF	GA	GD
34	17	8	9	53	37	+16	59	10	4	3	31	17	+14	7	4	6	22	20	+2

Source: Worldfootball

==== Results by round ====
Round	1
Ground	A
Result	D
Position	8

Source: Worldfootball
A = Away; H = Home; W = Win; D = Draw; L = Loss; P = Postponed

==== Matches ====
The league fixtures were unveiled on 11 September 2023.

21 September 2023 1	Pyramids	2–2	Zamalek	Cairo
19:00 UTC+3	El Said 24'; El Karti (yellow card) 33'; Gabr (yellow card) 65'; Sobhi 77'	Report	Roqa (yellow card) 21'; Mathlouthi (yellow card) 53'; Dunga 56'; Ndiaye 62'; Alaa (yellow card) 76'; Sobhy (yellow card) 87'	Stadium: 30 June Stadium; Referee: Mahmoud Bassiouny

25 September 2023 2	Zamalek	1–1	Al Mokawloon	Cairo
19:00 UTC+3	Esho (yellow card) 26'; Beso (yellow card) 31'; Sukar (yellow card) 45+4'; El Sisi (yellow card) 47'; Zizo (yellow card) 53'; Obama 83'	Report	Fawzy (yellow card) 45+2'; El Sheimy (yellow card) 53'; Eid (yellow card) 76'; Alaa Eldin 90+9'	Stadium: Cairo International Stadium; Referee: Amin Omar

7 October 2023 3	National Bank	1–2	Zamalek	Cairo
19:00 UTC+3	Bambo 45+9'		Awad (red card) 45+1'; Zizo 54'; Shikabala 90'	Stadium: Cairo International Stadium; Referee: Mohamed Maarouf

21 October 2023 4	Zamalek	5–1	Smouha	Cairo
19:00 UTC+3	Shalaby 3'; Zizo 13', (penalty missed) 45+1'; Obama 45+5'; Jaziri 81'; Shikabala 88'		Farid 67'	Stadium: Cairo International Stadium; Referee: Mohammed Yousef

27 October 2023 5	ENPPI	2–1	Zamalek	Cairo
20:00 UTC+2	Kamal 22'; Aoufa 68'		Zizo 30' (pen.)	Stadium: Osman Ahmed Osman Stadium; Referee: Mohamed Adel

3 November 2023 6	Zamalek	1–2	ZED	Cairo
19:00 UTC+2	Jaziri 3'		Ziko 32'; Dilson 81'	Stadium: Cairo International Stadium; Referee: Mahmoud Nagy

29 November 2023 7	Modern Future	0–2	Zamalek	Cairo
19:00 UTC+2	Rabia (yellow card) 42'		Zizo 39' (pen.); Ndiaye 45+3'	Stadium: Al Salam Stadium; Referee: Tarek Magdy

14 December 2023 9	Al Masry	1–0	Zamalek	Alexandria
19:00 UTC+2	Jelassi (penalty missed) 31'; Guenaoui 45+6'			Stadium: Borg El Arab Stadium; Referee: Mahmoud El Banna

19 February 2024 13	Ismaily	0–0	Zamalek	Ismailia
19:00 UTC+2	Ammar (yellow card) 46'; Sukar (yellow card) 63'; Adel (yellow card) 90+4'		Shehata (yellow card) 27'; Emad (yellow card) 63'	Stadium: Ismailia Stadium; Referee: Mohamed Adel

29 February 2024 14	Zamalek	1–0	El Dakhleya	Cairo
19:00 UTC+2	Gaber 83'			Stadium: Cairo International Stadium; Referee: Mahmoud Nagi

12 March 2024 15	El Gouna	3–2	Zamalek	El Gouna
21:30 UTC+2	Abou Elfetouh (yellow card) 23'; Salah 30'; El Sayed (yellow card) 39'; Mahmoud (yellow card) 44'; Emmanuel 74'; Randrianantenaina (yellow card) 77'; El Deghemy (yellow card) 79'; Etouga 81', (yellow card) 81'		Abou El Fotouh 51'; Akinyoola 56'; Maher (yellow card) 64'	Stadium: Khaled Bichara Stadium; Referee: Mohamed Salama

11 April 2024 8	Zamalek	3–0	Al Ittihad	Cairo
19:00 UTC+2	Zizo 14', 89'; Maher 34'	Report		Stadium: Cairo International Stadium; Referee: Ahmed El Ghandour

15 April 2024 10	Zamalek	2–1	Al Ahly	Cairo
19:00 UTC+2	Jaziri 44', 86'	Report	Nedved (yellow card) 21'; Abdelmonem (yellow card) 41'; Abdelkader 73'	Stadium: Cairo International Stadium; Referee: Ibrahim Nour El Din
Note: Postponed from 15 February.

2 May 2024 20	Zamalek	1–0	National Bank	Cairo
19:00	Zizo 45+6'	Report	Faisal (yellow card) 44' (yellow-red card) 55'	Stadium: Cairo International Stadium; Referee: Mohamed Adel

5 May 2024 21	Smouha	1–0	Zamalek	Alexandria
19:00	Liadi 53'; Hassan (yellow card) 54' (yellow-red card) 82'	Report		Stadium: Borg El Arab Stadium; Referee: Mahmoud El Banna

23 May 2024 24	Zamalek	1–1	Modern Future	Cairo
19:00	Jaziri 34'		Sadek 40'	Stadium: Osman Ahmed Osman Stadium; Referee: Amin Omar

27 May 2024 25	Al Ittihad	0–2	Zamalek	Alexandria
19:00			Maher 28'; Jaziri 57'	Stadium: Borg El Arab Stadium; Referee: Mohamed Maarouf

14 June 2024 11	Ceramica Cleopatra	1–2	Zamalek	Cairo
19:00	Ramadan 26'		Said 80'; Ndiaye 89'	Stadium: Osman Ahmed Osman Stadium; Referee: Abdelaziz El Sayed
Note: Postponed from 2 January.

17 June 2024 26	Zamalek	1–2	Al Masry	Alexandria
19:00	Obama 90+6'		Ben Youssef 20'; El Shamy 86'	Stadium: Borg El Arab Stadium; Referee: Ahmed Ghandour

21 June 2024 12	Zamalek	2–0	Pharco	Cairo
20:00	Shalaby 15'; El Said 51' (pen.)			Stadium: Cairo International Stadium; Referee: Mohamed El Ghazi
Note: The match was postponed for unclear reasons.

25 June 2024 27	Al Ahly	2–0; Awarded	Zamalek	Alexandria
19:00

29 June 2024 28	Zamalek	4–2	Ceramica Cleopatra	Cairo
19:00	Shalaby 4'; Emad 41'; Ndiaye 89'; Zizo 90+1'		Ebuka 21'; Ougola 72'	Stadium: Cairo International Stadium; Referee: Tarek Magdy

3 July 2024 29	Pharco	1–1	Zamalek	Alexandria
19:00 UTC+3	El Said 39' (pen.)		Zizo 28' (pen.)	Stadium: Borg El Arab Stadium; Referee: Mostafa El Shahdi

7 July 2024 30	Zamalek	2–1	Ismaily	Cairo
19:00 UTC+3	El Said 77' (pen.), 82' (pen.)		Magdy 69'	Stadium: Cairo International Stadium; Referee: Amin Omar

11 July 2024 16	Tala'ea El Gaish	1–2	Zamalek	Cairo
21:00 UTC+3	El Sheikh 69'		Obama 43'; El Said 54' (pen.)	Stadium: Gehaz El Reyada Stadium; Referee: Mohamed Maarouf
Note: Originally scheduled for 17 March 2024

15 July 2024 17	Zamalek	0–0	Baladiyat El Mahalla	Cairo
21:00 UTC+3				Stadium: Cairo International Stadium; Referee: Mahmoud Wafa
Note: Postponed from 3 April.

21 July 2024 27	El Dakhleya	1–2	Zamalek	Cairo
21:00	Samir 65' (pen.)		Obama 19', 55'	Stadium: Al Salam Stadium; Referee: Mohamed El Atabani

26 July 2024 28	Zamalek	1–1	Pyramids	Cairo
21:00	Shalaby 36'		Lakay 74' (pen.)	Stadium: Cairo International Stadium; Referee: Mohamed Adel

29 July 2024 19	Al Mokawloon Al Arab	2–1	Zamalek	Cairo
21:00	Salim 30'; Antar 53'		Jaziri 61'	Stadium: Osman Ahmed Osman Stadium; Referee: Mahmoud El Banna
Note: Postponed from 24 April.

2 August 2024 30	Zamalek	1–0	El Gouna	Cairo
21:00	Mathlouthi 15' (pen.)			Stadium: Cairo International Stadium; Referee: Hesham El Kady

5 August 2024 31	Zamalek	4–2	ENPPI	Cairo
21:00	Mansi 7', 14'; Obama 60', 63'		Amin 66'; El Nahass 90+2'	Stadium: Cairo International Stadium; Referee: Mahmoud Nassif

8 August 2024 32	ZED	0–1	Zamalek	Cairo
21:00			Atef 90'	Stadium: Cairo International Stadium; Referee: Ahmed Gamal

14 August 2024 33	Zamalek	1–3	Tala'ea El Gaish	Cairo
17:30	Akinyoola 35'		El Said 25'; Tarek 40'; Hamdy 74' (pen.)	Stadium: Cairo International Stadium; Referee: Walid Abdelrazek

17 August 2024 34	Baladiyat El Mahalla	2–2	Zamalek	Cairo
21:00	Mohsen 59'; Magdi 90'		Shikabala 70'; Mansi 75'	Stadium: Al Salam Stadium; Referee: Mohamed Abassa

=== 2022–23 Egypt Cup ===
8 November 2023 Semi-finals	Zamalek	3–3 (a.e.t.) (4–3 p)	Pyramids	Cairo
19:00 UTC+3	Emad 90+2'; Akinyoola 101'; Mansi 112'	Report	Mayele 5'; Fathi 92'; Hamdy 108'	Stadium: Cairo International Stadium; Referee: Ahmad Al-Ghandour
	Penalties
	Mathlouthi (penalty scored); Ashraf (penalty missed); Gomaa (penalty scored); Mansi (penalty scored); Zizo (penalty scored)		(penalty scored) El Said; (penalty scored) Sobhi; (penalty scored) Hafez; (penalty missed) Samy; (penalty missed) Fathi

8 March 2024 Final	Zamalek	0–2	Al Ahly	Riyadh, Saudi Arabia
20:30 UTC+3		Report	Ashour 84'; Afsha 90+4'	Stadium: Al-Awwal Park; Referee: Anderson Daronco (Brazil)

=== 2023–24 Egypt Cup ===
18 July 2024 Round of 32	Zamalek	5–2	Proxy	Cairo
20:00 UTC+3				Stadium: Osman Ahmed Osman Stadium

21 August 2024 Round of 16	Zamalek	1–1 (3–5 p)	Tala'ea El Gaish	Cairo
21:00 UTC+3				Stadium: Cairo International Stadium

=== CAF Confederation Cup ===
==== Second round ====
The draw for the qualifying rounds was held on 25 July 2023.

16 September 2023 First leg	Arta Solar 7 (Djibouti)	2–0	(Egypt) Zamalek	Dar es Salaam, Tanzania
16:00 UTC+3	Dadzie 46'; Elabeh 90+1'	Report		Stadium: Chamazi Stadium; Referee: Mohamed Athoumani (Comoros)

29 September 2023 Second leg	Zamalek (Egypt)	4–1 (4–3 agg.)	(Djibouti) Arta Solar 7	Cairo
19:00 UTC+3	Obama 16'; Shikabala 16'; Zizo 16'; Mathlouthi 16'	Report	Hassan 16'	Stadium: Cairo International Stadium; Referee: Daniel Nii Laryea (Ghana)

==== Group stage ====
The draw for the group stage was held on 6 October 2023.

Pos	Team	Pld	W	D	L	GF	GA	GD	Pts	Qualification	ZAM	SAL	SGA	SOAR
1	(Egypt) Zamalek	6	5	1	0	11	1	+10	16	Advance to knockout stage	—	1–0	1–0	3–0 (Note: CAF awarded Zamalek a 3–0 win after Académie SOAR failed to travel to Egypt.)
2	(Libya) Abu Salim	6	3	0	3	5	6	−1	9	Advance to knockout stage	1–2	—	1–0	1–0
3	(Angola) Sagrada Esperança	6	2	2	2	5	2	+3	8		0–0	3–0	—	2–0
4	(Guinea) Académie SOAR	6	0	1	5	0	12	−12	1		0–4	0–2	0–0	—

Source: CAF
Rules for classification: Group stage tiebreakers
Notes:

26 November 2023 1	Zamalek (Egypt)	1–0	(Libya) Abu Salim	Alexandria
18:00 UTC+2	Obama 73'	Report		Stadium: Borg El Arab Stadium; Referee: Mehrez Melki (Tunisia)

3 December 2023 2	Académie SOAR (Guinea)	0–4	(Egypt) Zamalek	Cairo (Egypt)
21:00 UTC+2		Report	Zizo 8'; Shikabala 30'; Jaziri 51'; Ndiaye 75'	Stadium: Al Salam Stadium; Referee: Abongile Tom (South Africa)

9 December 2023 3	Zamalek (Egypt)	1–0	(Angola) Sagrada Esperança	Alexandria
18:00 UTC+2	Zizo 42'	Report		Stadium: Borg El Arab Stadium; Referee: Abdulkadir Artan (Somalia)

20 December 2023 4	Sagrada Esperança (Angola)	0–0	(Egypt) Zamalek	Luanda, Angola
17:00 UTC+1		Report		Stadium: Estádio 11 de Novembro; Referee: Issa Sy (Senegal)

25 February 2024 5	Abu Salim (Libya)	1–2	(Egypt) Zamalek	Annaba, Algeria
17:00 UTC+1	Almiqlash 75'	Report	Mansi 7', 48'	Stadium: 19 May 1956 Stadium; Referee: Lamin Jammeh (Gambia)

3 March 2024 6	Zamalek (Egypt)	3–0; Awarded	(Guinea) Académie SOAR	Alexandria
		Report		Stadium: Borg El Arab Stadium

==== Knockout stage ====
===== Quarter-finals =====
The draw for the quarter-finals was held on 12 March 2024.

31 March 2024 First leg	Modern Future (Egypt)	1–2	(Egypt) Zamalek	Cairo
21:00 UTC+2	Yasser 35'	Report	Mathlouthi 45+4'; Zizo 88' (pen.)	Stadium: Al Salam Stadium; Referee: Jalal Jayed (Morocco)

7 April 2024 Second leg	Zamalek (Egypt)	1–1	(Egypt) Modern Future	Cairo
21:00 UTC+2	Hamdi 66'	Report	Ngwem 18'	Stadium: Cairo International Stadium; Referee: Mustapha Ghorbal (Algeria)

===== Semi-finals =====
The draw for the semi-finals was held on 12 March 2024 after the quarter-finals draw.

21 April 2024 First leg	Zamalek (Egypt)	0–0	(Ghana) Dreams FC	Cairo
19:00 UTC+3		Report		Stadium: Cairo International Stadium; Referee: Samuel Uwikunda (Rwanda)

28 April 2024 Second leg	Dreams FC (Ghana)	0–3 (0–3 agg.)	(Egypt) Zamalek	Kumasi, Ghana
16:00 UTC+0		Report	Mathlouthi 12'; Akinyoola 27'; Shalaby 59'	Stadium: Baba Yara Stadium; Referee: Alhadi Allaou Mahamat (Chad)

===== Finals =====
12 May 2024 First leg	RS Berkane (Morocco)	2–1	(Egypt) Zamalek	Berkane, Morocco
20:00 UTC+1	Dayo 13' (pen.); Tahif 32'	Report	Jaziri 46'	Stadium: Stade Municipal de Berkane; Attendance: 10,000; Referee: Peter Waweru (Kenya)

19 May 2024 Second leg	Zamalek (Egypt)	1–0 (2–2 (a) agg.)	(Morocco) RS Berkane	Cairo
20:00 UTC+3	Hamdi 23'	Report		Stadium: Cairo International Stadium; Attendance: 52,000; Referee: Issa Sy (Senegal)

=== Arab Club Champions Cup ===
==== Group stage ====
Pos	Team	Pld	W	D	L	GF	GA	GD	Pts	Qualification
1	(Saudi Arabia) Al-Shabab	3	2	1	0	2	0	+2	7	Advance to knockout stage
2	(Saudi Arabia) Al-Nassr	3	1	2	0	5	2	+3	5	Advance to knockout stage
3	(Egypt) Zamalek	3	1	1	1	5	2	+3	4	
4	(Tunisia) US Monastir	3	0	0	3	1	9	−8	0	

Source: UAFA
Rules for classification: Group stage tiebreakers

28 July 2023 1	Zamalek (Egypt)	4–0	(Tunisia) Union Monastirienne	Taif, Saudi Arabia
18:00 UTC+3	Ben Said 26' (o.g.); Zizo 43'; Abdallah 56', 64'	Report		Stadium: King Fahd Sports City; Referee: Samir Guezzaz (Morocco)

31 July 2023 3	Al-Shabab (Saudi Arabia)	1–0	(Egypt) Zamalek	Taif, Saudi Arabia
18:00 UTC+3	Banega 44' (pen.)	Report		Stadium: King Fahd Sports City; Referee: Abdulwahid Huraywidah (Libya)

3 August 2023 3	Zamalek (Egypt)	1–1	(Saudi Arabia) Al-Nassr	Taif, Saudi Arabia
18:00 UTC+3	Zizo 54' (pen.)	Report	Ronaldo 87'	Stadium: King Fahd Sports City; Referee: Redouane Jiyed (Morocco)
