= 2023–24 CAF Confederation Cup knockout stage =

International football competition in Africa

- Dates: 31 March – 19 May 2024

Tournament statistics
- Matches played: 14
- Goals scored: 31 (2.21 per match)

The 2023–24 CAF Confederation Cup knockout stage started on 31 March with the quarter-finals and ended on 19 May 2024 with the second leg of the final to decide the champions of the 2023–24 CAF Confederation Cup. A total of eight teams competed in the knockout stage.

Times are local.

== Round and draw dates ==
The schedule was as follows.

Round	Draw date	First leg	Second leg
Quarter-finals	12 March 2024	31 March 2024	7 April 2024
Semi-finals	12 March 2024	21 April 2024	28 April 2024
Final	12 March 2024	12 May 2024	19 May 2024

== Format ==
Each tie in the knockout phase was played over two legs, with each team playing one leg at home. The team that scored more goals on aggregate over the two legs advanced to the next round. If the aggregate score was level, the away goals rule was applied, i.e. the team that scored more goals away from home over the two legs advanced. If away goals were also equal, then extra time was not played and the winners were decided by a penalty shoot-out (Regulations III. 26 & 27). The mechanism of the draws for each round was as follows:

- In the draw for the quarter-finals, the four group winners were seeded, and the four group runners-up were unseeded. The seeded teams were drawn against the unseeded teams, with the seeded teams hosting the second leg. Teams from the same group could not be drawn against each other, while teams from the same association could be drawn against each other.
- In the draws for semi-finals, there were no seedings, and teams from the same group or the same association could be drawn against each other. As the draws for the quarter-finals and semi-finals were held together before the quarter-finals were played, the identity of the quarter-final winners was not known at the time of the semi-final draw.

== Qualified teams ==
The knockout stage involved the 8 teams which qualified as winners and runners-up of each of the eight groups in the group stage.

Group	Winners	Runners-up
A	(Algeria) USM Alger	(Egypt) Modern Future
B	(Egypt) Zamalek	(Libya) Abu Salim
C	(Ghana) Dreams F.C.	(Nigeria) Rivers United
D	(Morocco) RS Berkane	(Mali) Stade Malien

== Bracket ==
The bracket of the knockout stage was determined as follows:

Round	Matchups
Quarter-finals	(Group winners hosted second leg, matchups decided by draw, teams from same group cannot play each other): QF1; QF2; QF3; QF4
Semi-finals	(Matchups and order of legs decided by draw, between winners QF1, QF2, QF3, QF4): SF1; SF2
Final	Winners SF1 and SF2 faced each other in two legs to decide the champions

The bracket was decided after the draw for the knockout stage, which was held on 12 March 2024, 14:00 CAT (UTC+2) at the CAF headquarters in Cairo, Egypt.

Quarter-finals
(Nigeria) Rivers United	1	0	1
(Algeria) USM Alger	0	2	2
(Libya) Abu Salim	0	2	2
(Morocco) RS Berkane	0	3	3
(Egypt) Modern Future	1	1	2
(Egypt) Zamalek	2	1	3
(Mali) Stade Malien	1	1	2
(Ghana) Dreams F.C.	2	1	3

Semi-finals
(Algeria) USM Alger	0	0	0
(Morocco) RS Berkane (w/o)	3	3	6
(Egypt) Zamalek	0	3	3
(Ghana) Dreams F.C.	0	0	0

Final
(Morocco) RS Berkane	2	0	2
(Egypt) Zamalek (a)	1	1	2

== Quarter-finals ==
The draw for the quarter-finals was held on 12 March 2024.

=== Summary ===
The first legs were played on 31 March, and the second legs were played on 7 April 2024.

Team 1	Agg.	Team 2	1st leg	2nd leg
Modern Future (Egypt)	2–3	(Egypt) Zamalek	1–2	1–1
Abu Salim (Libya)	2–3	(Morocco) RS Berkane	0–0	2–3
Rivers United (Nigeria)	1–2	(Algeria) USM Alger	1–0	0–2
Stade Malien (Mali)	2–3	(Ghana) Dreams	1–2	1–1

=== Matches ===
31 March 2024
21:00 UTC+2

Modern Future (Egypt)	1–2	(Egypt) Zamalek
Yasser 35'	Report	Mathlouthi 45+4'; Zizo 88' (pen.)

Al Salam Stadium, Cairo
Referee: Jalal Jayed (Morocco)
7 April 2024
21:00 UTC+2

Zamalek (Egypt)	1–1	(Egypt) Modern Future
Hamdi 66'	Report	Ngwem 18'

Cairo International Stadium, Cairo
Referee: Mustapha Ghorbal (Algeria)

Zamalek won 3–2 on aggregate.

31 March 2024
21:00 UTC+2

Abu Salim (Libya)	0–0	(Morocco) RS Berkane
	Report

Benina Martyrs Stadium, Benghazi
Referee: Omar Artan (Somalia)
7 April 2024
22:00 UTC+0

RS Berkane (Morocco)	3–2	(Libya) Abu Salim
Bassène 68'; Tahif 72'; Dayo 90+15'	Report	Al Abani 47'; Aleiyan 83'

Stade Municipal de Berkane, Berkane
Referee: Mohamed Maarouf (Egypt)

RS Berkane won 3–2 on aggregate.

31 March 2024
14:00 UTC+1

Rivers United (Nigeria)	1–0	(Algeria) USM Alger
Okejepha 10'	Report

Godswill Akpabio International Stadium, Uyo
Referee: Samuel Uwikunda (Rwanda)
7 April 2024
22:00 UTC+1

USM Alger (Algeria)	2–0	(Nigeria) Rivers United
Kanou 37', 74'	Report

Stade du 5 Juillet, Algiers
Referee: Pacifique Ndabihawenimana (Burundi)

USM Alger won 2–1 on aggregate.

31 March 2024
17:00 UTC+0

Stade Malien (Mali)	1–2	(Ghana) Dreams FC
Diaby 53'	Report	Antwi 66', 73' (pen.)

Stade du 26 Mars, Bamako
Referee: Patrice Tanguy Mebiame (Gabon)
7 April 2024
16:00 UTC+0

Dreams FC (Ghana)	1–1	(Mali) Stade Malien
Simba 70'	Report	Diaby 59'

Baba Yara Stadium, Kumasi
Referee: Bamlak Tessema Weyesa (Ethiopia)

Dreams FC won 3–2 on aggregate.

== Semi-finals ==
The draw for the semi-finals was held on 12 March 2024 (after the quarter-finals draw).

=== Summary ===
The first legs were played on 21 April, and the second legs were played on 28 April 2024.

Team 1	Agg.	Team 2	1st leg	2nd leg
USM Alger (Algeria)	0–6 (w/o)	(Morocco) RS Berkane	0–3 (awd.)	0–3 (awd.)
Zamalek (Egypt)	3–0	(Ghana) Dreams FC	0–0	3–0

=== Matches ===
21 April 2024
20:00 UTC+1

USM Alger (Algeria)	0–3 Awarded (Note: Upon arriving to Algeria, RS Berkane official kits were seized by Algerian authorities, who refused to allow them to wear it in the match against USM Alger, due to the shirts featuring a map of Morocco that includes Western Sahara, which is a disputed territory that Morocco claims to be part of their land, while Algeria recognize it as part of the Sahrawi Arab Democratic Republic. The match was cancelled as a result, and RS Berkane were awarded a 3–0 walkover win on 24 April 2024.)	(Morocco) RS Berkane
	Report

Stade du 5 Juillet, Algiers
Referee: Abdel Aziz Mohamed Bouh (Mauritania)
28 April 2024
20:00 UTC+1

RS Berkane (Morocco)	3–0 Awarded (Note: RS Berkane won on walkover after USM Alger withdrew from the match, despite arriving to the stadium. The match was cancelled as a result, and RS Berkane were awarded a 3–0 win on 1 May 2024.)	(Algeria) USM Alger
	Report

Stade Municipal de Berkane, Berkane
Referee: Jean-Jacques Ndala Ngambo (DR Congo)

RS Berkane won on walkover after USM Alger withdrew.

21 April 2024
18:00 UTC+2

Zamalek (Egypt)	0–0	(Ghana) Dreams FC
	Report

Cairo International Stadium, Cairo
Referee: Samuel Uwikunda (Rwanda)
28 April 2024
16:00 UTC+0

Dreams FC (Ghana)	0–3	(Egypt) Zamalek
	Report	Mathlouthi 12'; Akinyoola 27'; Shalaby 59'

Baba Yara Stadium, Kumasi
Referee: Alhadi Allaou Mahamat (Chad)

Zamalek won 3–0 on aggregate.

== Final ==
The first leg was played on 12 May, and the second leg was played on 19 May 2024.

Team 1	Agg.	Team 2	1st leg	2nd leg
RS Berkane (Morocco)	2–2 (a)	(Egypt) Zamalek	2–1	0–1

12 May 2024
20:00 UTC+1

RS Berkane (Morocco)	2–1	(Egypt) Zamalek
Dayo 13' (pen.); Tahif 32'	Report	Jaziri 46'

Stade Municipal de Berkane, Berkane
Attendance: 10,000
Referee: Peter Waweru (Kenya)
19 May 2024
20:00 UTC+3

Zamalek (Egypt)	1–0	(Morocco) RS Berkane
Hamdi 23'	Report

Cairo International Stadium, Cairo
Attendance: 52,000
Referee: Issa Sy (Senegal)

2–2 on aggregate. Zamalek won on away goals.

== See also ==
- 2023–24 CAF Champions League knockout stage
