= 2023–24 CAF Confederation Cup group stage =

International football competition in Africa

- Dates: 26 November 2023 – 3 March 2024

Tournament statistics
- Matches played: 48
- Goals scored: 106 (2.21 per match)

The 2023–24 CAF Confederation Cup group stage began on 26 November 2023 and ended on 3 March 2024. A total of 16 teams competed in the group stage to decide the eight places in the knockout stage of the 2023–24 CAF Confederation Cup.

== Draw ==
The draw for the group stage was held on 6 October 2023, 12:00 GMT (14:00 local time, UTC+2), in Johannesburg, South Africa. The 16 winners of the second round of qualifying rounds were drawn into four groups of four.

The teams were seeded by their performances in the CAF competitions for the previous five seasons (CAF 5-year ranking points shown next to every team). Each group contains one team from each of Pot 1 and Pot 2, and two teams from Pot 3, and each team was allocated to the positions in their group according to their pot.

| Pot | Pot 1 | Pot 2 | Pot 3 |
|---|---|---|---|
| Teams | (Egypt) Zamalek (39 pts); (Morocco) RS Berkane (37 pts); (Algeria) USM Alger (27 pts); (Nigeria) Rivers United (10 pts) | (Republic of the Congo) Diables Noirs (5 pts); (Angola) Sagrada Esperança (4 pts); (Egypt) Modern Future (2.5 pts); (Tunisia) Club Africain (2 pts) | (Angola) Académica do Lobito; (Ghana) Dreams FC; (Guinea) Académie SOAR; (Libya) Abu Salim; (Libya) Al Hilal Benghazi; (Mali) Stade Malien; (South Africa) Sekhukhune United; (South Africa) SuperSport United |

== Format ==
In the group stage, each group was played on a home-and-away round-robin basis. The winners and runners-up of each group advanced to the quarter-finals of the knockout stage.

=== Tiebreakers ===
The teams were ranked according to points (3 points for a win, 1 point for a draw, 0 points for a loss). If tied on points, tiebreakers were applied in the following order (Regulations III. 20 & 21):

1. Points in head-to-head matches among tied teams;
2. Goal difference in head-to-head matches among tied teams;
3. Goals scored in head-to-head matches among tied teams;
4. Away goals scored in head-to-head matches among tied teams;
5. If more than two teams were tied, and after applying all head-to-head criteria above, a subset of teams were still tied, all head-to-head criteria above were reapplied exclusively to this subset of teams;
6. Goal difference in all group matches;
7. Goals scored in all group matches;
8. Away goals scored in all group matches;
9. Drawing of lots.

== Schedule ==
The schedule of each matchday was as follows.

| Matchday | Dates | Matches |
|---|---|---|
| Matchday 1 | 26 November 2023 | Team 1 vs. Team 4, Team 2 vs. Team 3 |
| Matchday 2 | 3 December 2023 | Team 3 vs. Team 1, Team 4 vs. Team 2 |
| Matchday 3 | 10 December 2023 | Team 4 vs. Team 3, Team 1 vs. Team 2 |
| Matchday 4 | 20 December 2023 | Team 3 vs. Team 4, Team 2 vs. Team 1 |
| Matchday 5 | 25 February 2024 | Team 4 vs. Team 1, Team 3 vs. Team 2 |
| Matchday 6 | 3 March 2024 | Team 1 vs. Team 3, Team 2 vs. Team 4 |

== Groups ==
All times are local.

=== Group A ===
| Pos | Team | Pld | W | D | L | GF | GA | GD | Pts | Qualification | USMA | MOF | HIL | SSU |
|---|---|---|---|---|---|---|---|---|---|---|---|---|---|---|
| 1 | (Algeria) USM Alger | 6 | 4 | 1 | 1 | 8 | 3 | +5 | 13 | Advance to knockout stage | — | 1–0 | 2–0 | 2–1 |
| 2 | (Egypt) Modern Future | 6 | 3 | 2 | 1 | 9 | 3 | +6 | 11 | Advance to knockout stage | 0–0 | — | 5–0 | 1–0 |
| 3 | (Libya) Al Hilal Benghazi | 6 | 2 | 0 | 4 | 6 | 13 | −7 | 6 | | 2–1 | 1–2 | — | 2–1 |
| 4 | (South Africa) SuperSport United | 6 | 1 | 1 | 4 | 5 | 9 | −4 | 4 | | 0–2 | 1–1 | 2–1 | — |

Source: CAF
Rules for classification: Group stage tiebreakers
26 November 2023
15:00 UTC+2

| Modern Future (Egypt) | 1–0 | (South Africa) SuperSport United |
|---|---|---|
| Mohamed 76' | Report |

Al Salam Stadium, Cairo
Referee: Jean Ouattara (Burkina Faso)
26 November 2023
20:00 UTC+1

| USM Alger (Algeria) | 2–0 | (Libya) Al Hilal Benghazi |
|---|---|---|
| Merili 54'; Orebonye 90+4' | Report |

Stade du 5 Juillet, Algiers
Referee: Ibrahim Kalilou Traoré (Ivory Coast)

3 December 2023
15:00 UTC+2

| SuperSport United (South Africa) | 0–2 | (Algeria) USM Alger |
|---|---|---|
| | Report | Radouani 5'; Benzaza 56' |

Peter Mokaba Stadium, Polokwane
Referee: Georges Gatogato (Burundi)
3 December 2023
18:00 UTC+2

| Al Hilal Benghazi (Libya) | 1–2 | (Egypt) Modern Future |
|---|---|---|
| Adrees 3' | Report | Mohsen 65'; Drammeh 90+2' |

Benina Martyrs Stadium, Benghazi
Referee: Jalal Jayed (Morocco)

10 December 2023
18:00 UTC+2

| Al Hilal Benghazi (Libya) | 2–1 | (South Africa) SuperSport United |
|---|---|---|
| Al Taeb 13', 61' | Report | Lungu 58' |

Benina Martyrs Stadium, Benghazi
Referee: Boubou Traoré (Mali)
10 December 2023
20:00 UTC+1

| USM Alger (Algeria) | 1–0 | (Egypt) Modern Future |
|---|---|---|
| Kanou 65' | Report |

Stade du 5 Juillet, Algiers
Referee: Ahmad Imtehaz Heeralall (Mauritius)

20 December 2023
18:00 UTC+2

| Modern Future (Egypt) | 0–0 | (Algeria) USM Alger |
|---|---|---|
| | Report |

Al Salam Stadium, Cairo
Referee: Abdel Aziz Mohamed Bouh (Mauritania)
20 December 2023
21:00 UTC+2

| SuperSport United (South Africa) | 2–1 | (Libya) Al Hilal Benghazi |
|---|---|---|
| Rasebotja 11'; Ighodaro 88' | Report | Salim 23' |

Peter Mokaba Stadium, Polokwane
Referee: Patrice Tanguy Mebiame (Gabon)

25 February 2024
15:00 UTC+2

| SuperSport United (South Africa) | 1–1 | (Egypt) Modern Future |
|---|---|---|
| Matodzi 69' | Report | Zaazaa 31' |

Peter Mokaba Stadium, Polokwane
Referee: Messie Nkounkou (Congo)
25 February 2024
18:00 UTC+2

| Al Hilal Benghazi (Libya) | 2–1 | (Algeria) USM Alger |
|---|---|---|
| Al Tawergi 14'; Al Taeb 50' | Report | Chita 63' |

Benina Martyrs Stadium, Benghazi
Referee: Haythem Guirat (Tunisia)

3 March 2024
17:00 UTC+1

| USM Alger (Algeria) | 2–1 | (South Africa) SuperSport United |
|---|---|---|
| Bacha 26'; Kanou 76' | Report | Matodzi 51' |

Stade du 5 Juillet, Algiers
Referee: Adissa Abdul Raphiou Ligali (Benin)
3 March 2024
18:00 UTC+2

| Modern Future (Egypt) | 5–0 | (Libya) Al Hilal Benghazi |
|---|---|---|
| Zaazaa 22'; Sadek 45'; Atef 55', 88'; Al Msmari 69' (o.g.) | Report |

Al Salam Stadium, Cairo
Referee: Pacifique Ndabihawenimana (Burundi)

=== Group B ===
| Pos | Team | Pld | W | D | L | GF | GA | GD | Pts | Qualification | ZAM | SAL | SGA | SOAR |
|---|---|---|---|---|---|---|---|---|---|---|---|---|---|---|
| 1 | (Egypt) Zamalek | 6 | 5 | 1 | 0 | 11 | 1 | +10 | 16 | Advance to knockout stage | — | 1–0 | 1–0 | 3–0 (Note: CAF awarded Zamalek a 3–0 win after Académie SOAR failed to travel to Egypt.) |
| 2 | (Libya) Abu Salim | 6 | 3 | 0 | 3 | 5 | 6 | −1 | 9 | Advance to knockout stage | 1–2 | — | 1–0 | 1–0 |
| 3 | (Angola) Sagrada Esperança | 6 | 2 | 2 | 2 | 5 | 2 | +3 | 8 | | 0–0 | 3–0 | — | 2–0 |
| 4 | (Guinea) Académie SOAR | 6 | 0 | 1 | 5 | 0 | 12 | −12 | 1 | | 0–4 | 0–2 | 0–0 | — |

Source: CAF
Rules for classification: Group stage tiebreakers
Notes:
26 November 2023
18:00 UTC+2

| Zamalek (Egypt) | 1–0 | (Libya) Abu Salim |
|---|---|---|
| Obama 73' | Report |

Borg El Arab Stadium, Alexandria
Referee: Mehrez Melki (Tunisia)
26 November 2023
17:00 UTC+1

| Sagrada Esperança (Angola) | 2–0 | (Guinea) Académie SOAR |
|---|---|---|
| Lépua 35'; Tati 75' | Report |

Estádio 11 de Novembro, Luanda
Referee: Mahmood Ismail (Sudan)

3 December 2023
14:00 UTC+1

| Abu Salim (Libya) | 1–0 | (Angola) Sagrada Esperança |
|---|---|---|
| Aleiyan 88' | Report |

19 May 1956 Stadium, Annaba (Algeria)
Referee: Clement Franklin Kpan (Ivory Coast)
3 December 2023
21:00 UTC+2

| Académie SOAR (Guinea) | 0–4 | (Egypt) Zamalek |
|---|---|---|
| | Report | Zizo 8'; Shikabala 30'; Jaziri 51'; Ndiaye 75' |

Al Salam Stadium, Cairo (Egypt)
Referee: Abongile Tom (South Africa)

9 December 2023
18:00 UTC+2

| Zamalek (Egypt) | 1–0 | (Angola) Sagrada Esperança |
|---|---|---|
| Zizo 42' | Report |

Borg El Arab Stadium, Alexandria
Referee: Abdulkadir Artan (Somalia)
10 December 2023
14:00 UTC+1

| Abu Salim (Libya) | 1–0 | (Guinea) Académie SOAR |
|---|---|---|
| Elghadi 61' | Report |

19 May 1956 Stadium, Annaba (Algeria)
Referee: Patrice Milazare (Mauritius)

20 December 2023
17:00 UTC+1

| Sagrada Esperança (Angola) | 0–0 | (Egypt) Zamalek |
|---|---|---|
| | Report |

Estádio 11 de Novembro, Luanda
Referee: Issa Sy (Senegal)
20 December 2023
20:00 UTC+1

| Académie SOAR (Guinea) | 0–2 | (Libya) Abu Salim |
|---|---|---|
| | Report | El Bouashi 19'; Alabani 65' |

Chahid Hamlaoui Stadium, Constantine (Algeria)
Referee: Daniel Nii Laryea (Ghana)

25 February 2024
17:00 UTC+1

| Abu Salim (Libya) | 1–2 | (Egypt) Zamalek |
|---|---|---|
| Almiqlash 75' | Report | Mansi 7', 48' |

19 May 1956 Stadium, Annaba (Algeria)
Referee: Lamin Jammeh (Gambia)
25 February 2024
19:00 UTC+0

| Académie SOAR (Guinea) | 0–0 | (Angola) Sagrada Esperança |
|---|---|---|
| | Report |

Stade de la Paix, Bouaké (Ivory Coast)
Referee: Jean Ouattara (Burkina Faso)

3 March 2024
19:00 UTC+2

| Zamalek (Egypt) | 3–0 Awarded (Note: On 1 March 2024, Académie SOAR announced that, due to failing to obtain an access permit to Egypt from the Guinean authorities, they won't be able to attend the match against Zamalek. Two days later, the match was officially cancelled by CAF. Later, on 11 March, CAF awarded Zamalek a 3–0 walkover win.) | (Guinea) Académie SOAR |
|---|---|---|
| | Report |

Cairo International Stadium, Cairo
Referee: Mitiku Tewodros (Ethiopia)
3 March 2024
20:00 UTC+1

| Sagrada Esperança (Angola) | 3–0 | (Libya) Abu Salim |
|---|---|---|
| Judour 4' (o.g.); Tati 55'; Walter 66' | Report |

Estádio 11 de Novembro, Luanda
Referee: Boubou Traoré (Mali)

=== Group C ===
| Pos | Team | Pld | W | D | L | GF | GA | GD | Pts | Qualification | DFC | RIV | CA | ADL |
|---|---|---|---|---|---|---|---|---|---|---|---|---|---|---|
| 1 | (Ghana) Dreams FC | 6 | 4 | 0 | 2 | 11 | 7 | +4 | 12 (Note: Ranked on goal difference: Dreams FC +4, Rivers United +2.) | Advance to knockout stage | — | 2–1 | 1–0 | 4–0 |
| 2 | (Nigeria) Rivers United | 6 | 4 | 0 | 2 | 10 | 8 | +2 | 12 | Advance to knockout stage | 2–1 | — | 1–0 | 3–0 |
| 3 | (Tunisia) Club Africain | 6 | 3 | 1 | 2 | 9 | 4 | +5 | 10 | | 2–0 | 3–0 | — | 1–1 |
| 4 | (Angola) Académica do Lobito | 6 | 0 | 1 | 5 | 6 | 17 | −11 | 1 | | 2–3 | 2–3 | 1–3 | — |

Source: Flashscore
Rules for classification: Group stage tiebreakers
Notes:
26 November 2023
14:00 UTC+1

| Club Africain (Tunisia) | 2–0 | (Ghana) Dreams FC |
|---|---|---|
| Meziani 5'; Srarfi 19' | Report |

Stade Hammadi Agrebi, Tunis
Referee: Andofetra Rakotojaona (Madagascar)
26 November 2023
17:00 UTC+1

| Rivers United (Nigeria) | 3–0 | (Angola) Académica do Lobito |
|---|---|---|
| Antwi 3'; Odeh 46'; Asiegbu 61' | Report |

Godswill Akpabio International Stadium, Uyo
Referee: Adalbert Diouf (Senegal)

3 December 2023
16:00 UTC+0

| Dreams FC (Ghana) | 2–1 | (Nigeria) Rivers United |
|---|---|---|
| Antwi 35'; Issah 74' | Report | Oyowah 90+3' |

Baba Yara Stadium, Kumasi
Referee: Messie Nkounkou (Congo)
3 December 2023
17:00 UTC+1

| Académica do Lobito (Angola) | 1–3 | (Tunisia) Club Africain |
|---|---|---|
| Samuel 60' | Report | Srarfi 46', 75'; H. Labidi 53' |

Estádio 11 de Novembro, Luanda
Referee: Adissa Abdul Raphiou Ligali (Benin)

10 December 2023
16:00 UTC+1

| Rivers United (Nigeria) | 1–0 | (Tunisia) Club Africain |
|---|---|---|
| Nwagua 43' | Report |

Godswill Akpabio International Stadium, Uyo
Referee: Dahane Beida (Mauritania)
10 December 2023
17:00 UTC+1

| Académica do Lobito (Angola) | 2–3 | (Ghana) Dreams FC |
|---|---|---|
| Nelo 14'; Samuel 90' | Report | Issah 10'; Antwi 58'; Avocevou 88' |

Estádio 11 de Novembro, Luanda
Referee: Mahmoud El Banna (Egypt)

20 December 2023
16:00 UTC+0

| Dreams FC (Ghana) | 4–0 | (Angola) Académica do Lobito |
|---|---|---|
| A. Boateng 35'; Adi Boyó 49' (o.g.); Issah 74'; Nuhu 90+2' | Report |

Baba Yara Stadium, Kumasi
Referee: Samir Guezzaz (Morocco)
20 December 2023
20:00 UTC+1

| Club Africain (Tunisia) | 3–0 | (Nigeria) Rivers United |
|---|---|---|
| Eduwo 6', 45'; Bedoui 62' | Report |

Stade Hammadi Agrebi, Tunis
Referee: Mahmood Ismail (Sudan)

25 February 2024
17:00 UTC+1

| Académica do Lobito (Angola) | 2–3 | (Nigeria) Rivers United |
|---|---|---|
| Cabibi 37' (pen.); Camuege 67' | Report | Udom 40'; Oyowah 44' (pen.); Mohammed 48' |

Estádio 11 de Novembro, Luanda
Referee: Abdulrazg Ahmed (Libya)
25 February 2024
16:00 UTC+0

| Dreams FC (Ghana) | 1–0 | (Tunisia) Club Africain |
|---|---|---|
| Atuahene 49' | Report |

Baba Yara Stadium, Kumasi
Referee: Ahmad Imtehaz Heeralall (Mauritius)

3 March 2024
17:00 UTC+1

| Rivers United (Nigeria) | 2–1 | (Ghana) Dreams FC |
|---|---|---|
| Deputy 61'; Godswill 90+10' | Report | Issah 40' |

Godswill Akpabio International Stadium, Uyo
Referee: Youcef Gamouh (Algeria)
3 March 2024
17:00 UTC+1

| Club Africain (Tunisia) | 1–1 | (Angola) Académica do Lobito |
|---|---|---|
| Eduwo 58' | Report | Samuel 78' |

Stade Hammadi Agrebi, Tunis
Referee: Clement Franklin Kpan (Ivory Coast)

=== Group D ===
| Pos | Team | Pld | W | D | L | GF | GA | GD | Pts | Qualification | RSB | MLI | SKU | DNS |
|---|---|---|---|---|---|---|---|---|---|---|---|---|---|---|
| 1 | (Morocco) RS Berkane | 6 | 4 | 2 | 0 | 10 | 2 | +8 | 14 | Advance to knockout stage | — | 3–0 | 2–0 | 2–0 |
| 2 | (Mali) Stade Malien | 6 | 3 | 1 | 2 | 6 | 6 | 0 | 10 | Advance to knockout stage | 1–2 | — | 1–0 | 1–0 |
| 3 | (South Africa) Sekhukhune United | 6 | 1 | 3 | 2 | 2 | 4 | −2 | 6 | | 0–0 | 0–0 | — | 2–1 |
| 4 | (Republic of the Congo) Diables Noirs | 6 | 0 | 2 | 4 | 3 | 9 | −6 | 2 | | 1–1 | 1–3 | 0–0 | — |

Source: CAF
Rules for classification: Group stage tiebreakers
26 November 2023
17:00 UTC+1

| Diables Noirs (Republic of the Congo) | 1–3 | (Mali) Stade Malien |
|---|---|---|
| Nkolo 69' (pen.) | Report | A. Traoré 4'; Diaby 10'; Yakubu 41' |

Stade Alphonse Massemba-Débat, Brazzaville
Referee: Elmabrouk Muhammad (Libya)
26 November 2023
20:00 UTC+1

| RS Berkane (Morocco) | 2–0 | (South Africa) Sekhukhune United |
|---|---|---|
| Tahif 14'; El Fahli 86' | Report |

Stade Municipal de Berkane, Berkane
Referee: Djindo Louis Houngnandande (Benin)

3 December 2023
16:00 UTC+0

| Stade Malien (Mali) | 1–2 | (Morocco) RS Berkane |
|---|---|---|
| M. Traoré 71' | Report | Bassène 30', 37' |

Stade du 26 Mars, Bamako
Referee: Celso Armindo Alvação (Mozambique)
3 December 2023
21:00 UTC+2

| Sekhukhune United (South Africa) | 2–1 | (Republic of the Congo) Diables Noirs |
|---|---|---|
| Sithole 30'; Cardoso 44' | Report | Ngakosso-Oko 27' |

Peter Mokaba Stadium, Polokwane
Referee: Amin Omar (Egypt)

10 December 2023
21:00 UTC+2

| Sekhukhune United (South Africa) | 0–0 | (Mali) Stade Malien |
|---|---|---|
| | Report |

Peter Mokaba Stadium, Polokwane
Referee: Lotfi Bekouassa (Algeria)
10 December 2023
20:00 UTC+1

| RS Berkane (Morocco) | 2–0 | (Republic of the Congo) Diables Noirs |
|---|---|---|
| Zghoudi 28'; El Mourabit 54' | Report |

Stade Municipal de Berkane, Berkane
Referee: Jean Ouattara (Burkina Faso)

20 December 2023
14:00 UTC+1

| Diables Noirs (Republic of the Congo) | 1–1 | (Morocco) RS Berkane |
|---|---|---|
| Ngakosso-Oko 41' | Report | Zghoudi 53' |

Stade Alphonse Massemba-Débat, Brazzaville
Referee: Ibrahim Kalilou Traoré (Ivory Coast)
20 December 2023
16:00 UTC+0

| Stade Malien (Mali) | 1–0 | (South Africa) Sekhukhune United |
|---|---|---|
| Tiesse 63' | Report |

Stade du 26 Mars, Bamako
Referee: Mustapha Ghorbal (Algeria)

25 February 2024
16:00 UTC+0

| Stade Malien (Mali) | 1–0 | (Republic of the Congo) Diables Noirs |
|---|---|---|
| Kouma 90' | Report |

Stade du 26 Mars, Bamako
Referee: Sadok Selmi (Tunisia)
25 February 2024
21:00 UTC+2

| Sekhukhune United (South Africa) | 0–0 | (Morocco) RS Berkane |
|---|---|---|
| | Report |

Peter Mokaba Stadium, Polokwane
Referee: Adalbert Diouf (Senegal)

3 March 2024
14:00 UTC+1

| Diables Noirs (Republic of the Congo) | 0–0 | (South Africa) Sekhukhune United |
|---|---|---|
| | Report |

Stade Alphonse Massemba-Débat, Brazzaville
Referee: Tsegay Mogos Teklu (Eritrea)
3 March 2024
20:00 UTC+1

| RS Berkane (Morocco) | 3–0 | (Mali) Stade Malien |
|---|---|---|
| Bassène 37'; Zghoudi 86'; El Mourabit 89' | Report |

Stade Municipal de Berkane, Berkane
Referee: Andofetra Rakotojaona (Madagascar)

== See also ==
- 2023–24 CAF Champions League group stage
