= 2023–24 in Algerian football =

Football in Algeria
- Season: 2023–24

Men's football
- Ligue Pro. 1: MC Alger
- Ligue 2: Centre East Olympique Akbou; Centre West ES Mostaganem
- Inter-Régions: West MC Saïda; Centre West JS El Biar; Centre East JS Djijel; East US Chaouia; South West US Béchar Djedid; South East MB Rouissat
- Algerian Cup: CR Belouizdad

Women's football
- Championship Elite: CF Akbou
- Championship D1: Groupe 1 AS Oran Centre; Groupe 2 CE Atlétic Sétif
- Championship D2: Centre JS Kabylie; West RS Tissemsilt; East CSASFW Oum El Bouaghi; South JS Saoura
- Women's Cup: CF Akbou
- Women's League Cup: CF Akbou

The 2023–24 season will be the 61st season of competitive association football in Algeria.

== National teams ==
=== Algeria men's national football team ===
==== Results and fixtures ====
===== Friendlies =====
12 September 2023 Friendly	Senegal	0–1	Algeria	Dakar, Senegal
19:00 UTC+0		Report	Chaïbi 64'	Stadium: Diamniadio Olympic Stadium; Referee: Dahane Beida (Mauritania)

12 October 2023 Friendly	Algeria	5–1	Cape Verde	Constantine, Algeria
20:00 UTC+1	Amoura 12'; Aouar 39', 41'; Zerrouki 61'; Slimani 89' (pen.)	Report	Bebé 55'	Stadium: Mohamed Hamlaoui Stadium; Referee: Mehrez Melki (Tunisia)

16 October 2023 Friendly	Egypt	1–1	Algeria	Al Ain, United Arab Emirates
	H. Fathi 62'	Report	Slimani 90+3'	Stadium: Hazza bin Zayed Stadium; Referee: Yahya Ali Al Mulla (United Arab Emirates)

5 January 2024 Friendly	Togo	0–3	Algeria	Lomé, Togo
21:00 UTC+0		Report (FAF)	Bensebaini 22', 70'; Slimani 55'	Stadium: Stade de Kégué; Attendance: 5,000; Referee: Raphiou Ligali (Benin)

9 January 2024 Friendly	Burundi	0–4	Algeria	Lomé, Togo
15:00 UTC+0			Bounedjah 1'; Mahrez 39'; Slimani 87'; Amoura 90+3'	Stadium: Stade de Kégué; Attendance: 0 Referee: Aklesso Gnama (Togo)

22 March 2024 2024 FIFA World Series	Algeria	3–2	Bolivia	Algiers, Algeria
22:00 UTC+1	A. Gouiri 43'; Y. Benzia 79'; A. Mandi 90+3'	Report	Algarañaz 47'; Sagredo 70'	Stadium: Nelson Mandela Stadium; Referee: Dahane Beida (Mauritania)

26 March 2024 2024 FIFA World Series	Algeria	3–3	South Africa	Algiers, Algeria
22:00 UTC+1	Benzia 22', 70'; Brahimi 53'	Report	Zwane 34', 45+5'; Rayners 66'	Stadium: Nelson Mandela Stadium; Referee: Amir Loussaif (Tunisia)

===== 2023 Africa Cup of Nations =====
====== Group D ======
Pos	Team	Pld	W	D	L	GF	GA	GD	Pts	Qualification
1	Angola	3	2	1	0	6	3	+3	7	Advance to knockout stage
2	Burkina Faso	3	1	1	1	3	4	−1	4	Advance to knockout stage
3	Mauritania	3	1	0	2	3	4	−1	3	Advance to knockout stage
4	Algeria	3	0	2	1	3	4	−1	2	

Source: CAF
Rules for classification: Group stage tiebreakers

15 January	Algeria	1–1	Angola	Bouaké, Ivory Coast
20:00 UTC+0	Bounedjah 18'	Report	Mabululu 68' (pen.)	Stadium: Stade de la Paix; Attendance: 19,740; Referee: Issa Sy (Senegal)

20 January 2024	Algeria	2–2	Burkina Faso	Bouaké, Ivory Coast
14:00 UTC+0	Bounedjah 51', 90+5'	Report	Konaté 45+3'; Traoré 71' (pen.)	Stadium: Stade de la Paix; Attendance: 33,501; Referee: Abongile Tom (South Africa)

23 January 2024	Mauritania	1–0	Algeria	Bouaké, Ivory Coast
20:00 UTC+0	Yali 37'	Report		Stadium: Stade de la Paix; Attendance: 28,010; Referee: Omar Artan (Somalia)

==== 2026 FIFA World Cup qualification ====
Pos	Team	Pld	W	D	L	GF	GA	GD	Pts	Qualification
1	Algeria	10	8	1	1	24	8	+16	25	2026 FIFA World Cup
2	Uganda	10	6	0	4	14	9	+5	18	
3	Mozambique	10	6	0	4	14	17	−3	18	
4	Guinea	10	4	3	3	11	8	+3	15	
5	Botswana	10	3	1	6	12	16	−4	10	
6	Somalia	10	0	1	9	3	20	−17	1	

Source: FIFA
Rules for classification: Tiebreakers

16 November 2023 1	Algeria	3–1	Somalia	Algiers
17:00 UTC+1	Abdi 2' (o.g.); Bounedjah 31'; Slimani 80'	Report	Ahmed 65'	Stadium: Nelson Mandela Stadium; Attendance: 40,784; Referee: Boubou Traore (Mali)

19 November 2023 2	Mozambique	0–2	Algeria	Maputo
15:00 UTC+2		Report	Chaïbi 69'; Zerrouki 80'	Stadium: Estádio do Zimpeto; Referee: Samuel Uwikunda (Rwanda)

6 June 2024 3	Algeria	1–2	Guinea	Algiers
20:00 UTC+1	Baldé 52' (o.g.)	Report	M. Sylla 50'; A. Camara 63'	Stadium: Nelson Mandela Stadium; Attendance: 32,000; Referee: Bamlak Tessema Weyesa (Ethiopia)

10 June 2024 4	Uganda	1–2	Algeria	Kampala
19:00 UTC+3	Mutyaba 10'	Report	Aouar 46'; Benrahma 58'	Stadium: Mandela National Stadium; Attendance: 45,000; Referee: Adissa Abdul Raphiou Ligali (Benin)

=== Algeria women's national football team ===
==== Results and fixtures ====
===== Friendlies =====
24 February 2024 Friendly	Algeria	2–0	Burkina Faso	Algiers, Algeria
16:00 UTC+1	Battouri 32'; Bouhenni 62'	Report (FAF)		Stadium: Centre technique national de Sidi Moussa

27 February 2024 Friendly	Algeria	3–0	Burkina Faso	Algiers, Algeria
16:00 UTC+1	Boussaha 12'; Dafeur 58'; Guellati 64' (pen.)	Report (FAF)		Stadium: Nelson Mandela Stadium

4 April 2024 Friendly	Tunisia	2–1	Algeria	Tunis, Tunisia
15:00 UTC+1	Ayadi 60'; Hamdi 90+2'	Report (FAF)	Bouhenni 48'	Stadium: Chedly Zouiten Stadium

7 April 2024 Friendly	Tunisia	2–2	Algeria	Tunis, Tunisia
15:00 UTC+1	Ben Hadj Mahmoud 29'; Hamdi 69'	Report (FAF)	Bouhenni 20' (pen.), 44'	Stadium: Chedly Zouiten Stadium

31 May 2024 Friendly	Algeria	8–0	(Algeria) CS Constantine	Blida, Algeria
11:00 UTC+1	Bouhenni 7', 19', 39'; D'Oria 21'; Bethi 24'; Belkacemi 59'; Ayadi 88'; Zemma 90+1'	Report (FAF)		Stadium: Mustapha Tchaker Stadium

3 June 2024 Friendly	Algeria	6–0	(Algeria) CF Akbou	Blida, Algeria
11:00 UTC+1	Dafeur 35'; Bouhani 53', 65'; Boussaha 59'; Bethi 87'; Naili 90'	Report (FAF)		Stadium: Mustapha Tchaker Stadium

==== 2024 Women's Africa Cup of Nations qualification ====
===== First round =====
20 September 2023	Uganda	1–2	Algeria	Njeru
16:00 UTC+3	Najjemba 87' (pen.)	Report (FAF); Report (FUFA)	Chebel 47'; Karchouni 51'	Stadium: FUFA Technical Centre; Referee: Tatu Nuru Malogo (Tanzania)

26 September 2023	Algeria	1–1	Uganda	Oran
19:00 UTC+1	Bouhenni 5'		Najjemba 67' (pen.)	Stadium: Miloud Hadefi Stadium; Referee: Chahenda El Maghribi (Egypt)

===== Second round =====
30 November 2023	Algeria	5–1	Burundi	Algiers
17:00 UTC+1	Boutaleb 32', 43', 67'; Boussaha 65'; Chebel 80'	Report (FAF)	Niyomwungere 29'	Stadium: Stade du 5 Juillet; Referee: Aline Guimbang A Etong (Cameroon)

4 December 2023	Burundi	0–1	Algeria	Algiers (Algeria)
17:00 UTC+3		Report (FAF)	Boutaleb 17'	Stadium: Stade du 5 Juillet; Referee: Dominique Hanjavola (Madagascar)

=== U–20 ===
==== African U-20 Women's World Cup qualification ====
===== Second round =====
8 October 2023	Mali	1–0	Algeria	Sétif (Algeria)
18:00 UTC+1	D. Traoré 67'	Report (FAF)		Stadium: 8 May 1945 Stadium; Referee: Fatoumata Sall Touré (Senegal)

13 October 2023	Algeria	2–1	Mali	Sétif
18:00 UTC+1	Cissé 51' (o.g.); El Hadj 86'	Report (FAF)	Berkous 58' (o.g.)	Stadium: 8 May 1945 Stadium; Referee: Shahenda Elmaghrabi (Egypt)

=== U–17 ===
==== African U-17 Women's World Cup qualification ====
===== Second round =====
4 February 2024	Benin	2–0	Algeria	Cotonou
14:00 UTC+1	Honfo 48'; Toudonou 83' (pen.)	Report; Report (FAF)		Stadium: Stade de l'Amitié

9 February 2024	Algeria	2–0 (8–7 p)	Benin	Algiers
17:00 UTC+1	Aït El Kadi 64'; Rebbahi 74'	Report; Report (FAF)		Stadium: Stade du 5 Juillet

===== Third round =====
10 May 2024	Morocco	4–0	Algeria	Berkane
20:00 UTC+1	Aboucharif 32'; Ihssan 41'; Bentahri 50'; Sehoul 58' (o.g.)	Report; Report (FRMF)		Stadium: Berkane Municipal Stadium; Referee: Patience Ndidi Madu (Nigeria)

17 May 2024	Algeria	0–4	Morocco	Algiers
17:30 UTC+1		Report	Boughazi 6'; Mokhtar Jamaï 62', 79'; Haizoun 76'	Stadium: Salem Mabrouki Stadium

== CAF competitions ==
=== CAF Super Cup ===
15 September 2023
21:00 UTC+3

Al Ahly (Egypt)	0–1	(Algeria) USM Alger
	Report	Belaïd 43' (pen.)

King Fahd Stadium, Taif (Saudi Arabia)
Attendance: 10,000
Referee: Pierre Atcho (Gabon)

=== CAF Champions League ===
==== Qualifying rounds ====
===== First round =====
Team 1	Agg.	Team 2	1st leg	2nd leg
CS Constantine (Algeria)	0–3	(Tunisia) Étoile du Sahel	0–2	0–1

===== Second round =====
Team 1	Agg.	Team 2	1st leg	2nd leg
Bo Rangers (Sierra Leone)	2–6	(Algeria) CR Belouizdad	1–3	1–3

==== Group stage ====
===== Group D =====
Pos	Team	Pld	W	D	L	GF	GA	GD	Pts	Qualification	AHL	YNG	CRB	MED
1	(Egypt) Al Ahly	6	3	3	0	6	1	+5	12	Advance to knockout stage	—	1–0	0–0	3–0
2	(Tanzania) Young Africans	6	2	2	2	9	6	+3	8 (Note: Ranked on head-to-head goal difference: Young Africans +1, CR Belouizdad –1.)	Advance to knockout stage	1–1	—	4–0	3–0
3	(Algeria) CR Belouizdad	6	2	2	2	7	6	+1	8		0–0	3–0	—	3–0
4	(Ghana) Medeama	6	1	1	4	3	12	−9	4		0–1	1–1	2–1	—

Source: CAF

=== CAF Confederation Cup ===
==== Qualifying rounds ====
===== First round =====
Team 1	Agg.	Team 2	1st leg	2nd leg
Bendel Insurance (Nigeria)	1–1 (4–3 p)	(Algeria) ASO Chlef	1–0	0–1

===== Second round =====
Team 1	Agg.	Team 2	1st leg	2nd leg
FUS Rabat (Morocco)	1–1 (a)	(Algeria) USM Alger	1–1	0–0

==== Group stage ====
===== Group A =====
Pos	Team	Pld	W	D	L	GF	GA	GD	Pts	Qualification	USMA	MOF	HIL	SSU
1	(Algeria) USM Alger	6	4	1	1	8	3	+5	13	Advance to knockout stage	—	1–0	2–0	2–1
2	(Egypt) Modern Future	6	3	2	1	9	3	+6	11	Advance to knockout stage	0–0	—	5–0	1–0
3	(Libya) Al Hilal Benghazi	6	2	0	4	6	13	−7	6		2–1	1–2	—	2–1
4	(South Africa) SuperSport United	6	1	1	4	5	9	−4	4		0–2	1–1	2–1	—

Source: CAF

==== Knockout phase ====
===== Quarter-finals =====
Team 1	Agg.	Team 2	1st leg	2nd leg
Rivers United (Nigeria)	1–2	(Algeria) USM Alger	1–0	0–2

===== Semi-finals =====
Team 1	Agg.	Team 2	1st leg	2nd leg
USM Alger (Algeria)	0–6 (w/o)	(Morocco) RS Berkane	0–3 (awd.)	0–3 (awd.)

=== CAF Women's Champions League ===
==== UNAF Qualifiers ====
Pos	Team	Pld	W	D	L	GF	GA	GD	Pts	Qualification
1	(Morocco) SC Casablanca	3	3	0	0	13	5	+8	9	Main tournament
2	(Algeria) Afak Relizane	3	2	0	1	12	5	+7	6	
3	(Egypt) Wadi Degla (H)	3	1	0	2	7	13	−6	3	
4	(Tunisia) ASF Sousse	3	0	0	3	4	13	−9	0	

Source: unafonline.org
(H) Hosts

== Promotion and relegation ==
=== Pre-season ===
League	Promoted to league	Relegated from league
Ligue 1	US Souf; ES Ben Aknoun	RC Arbaâ; HB Chelghoum Laïd
Ligue 2	JS Guir Abadla; WA Mostaganem; ESM Koléa; Olympique Akbou; MSP Batna; O Magrane	US Chaouia; HAMRA Annaba; JSM Skikda; MC Saïda; WA Tlemcen; RC Relizane
Inter Régions	CRB Ben Badis; IRB Sougueur; HRB Fouka; AS Bordj Ghedir; JS Azazga; RC Bougaa; US Boukhadra; US Béchar Djedid; Olympique El Oued; IRB Kheneg	IR El Biodh; FCB Frenda; IRB Maghnia; SC Aïn Defla; JS Tixeraine; CA Bordj Bou Arreridj; WR M'Sila; ESF Bir El Ater; CRB Kais; ES Ouargla; NARB Reghaia

== League season ==
=== Ligue Professionnelle 1 ===
Pos	Team	Pld	W	D	L	GF	GA	GD	Pts	Qualification or relegation
1	MC Alger (C)	30	19	8	3	55	20	+35	65	Qualification for CAF Champions League
2	CR Belouizdad	30	15	8	7	37	20	+17	53	Qualification for CAF Champions League
3	CS Constantine	30	15	8	7	46	30	+16	53	Qualification for CAF Confederation Cup
4	USM Alger	30	15	4	11	40	32	+8	49	Qualification for CAF Confederation Cup
5	ES Sétif	30	14	6	10	37	37	0	48	
6	Paradou AC	30	11	9	10	36	22	+14	42	
7	JS Kabylie	30	10	12	8	33	27	+6	42	
8	ASO Chlef	30	11	8	11	41	40	+1	41	
9	JS Saoura	30	11	7	12	34	37	−3	40	
10	USM Khenchela	30	11	6	13	33	39	−6	39	
11	MC El Bayadh	30	10	8	12	29	30	−1	38	
12	NC Magra	30	9	11	10	30	32	−2	38	
13	MC Oran	30	9	9	12	26	33	−7	36	
14	US Biskra	30	9	9	12	25	34	−9	36	
15	ES Ben Aknoun (R)	30	8	8	14	32	37	−5	32 (Note: ES Ben Aknoun awarded 3–0 win against US Souf.)	Relegation to Algerian Ligue 2
16	US Souf (R)	30	2	1	27	22	86	−64	7 (Note: US Souf lost 3–0 win against ES Ben Aknoun by penalty.)	Relegation to Algerian Ligue 2

Source: the-sports.org
Rules for classification: 1) points; 2) head-to-head points; 3) head-to-head goal difference; 4) goal difference; 5) total goals; 6) fairplay ranking; 7) playoff.
(C) Champions; (R) Relegated

=== Ligue 2 ===
Group Centre East
Pos	Team	Pld	W	D	L	GF	GA	GD	Pts	Promotion or relegation
1	Olympique Akbou (C, P)	30	22	4	4	59	19	+40	70	Ligue 1
2	MSP Batna	30	18	7	5	46	22	+24	61	
3	JS Bordj Ménaïel	30	12	9	9	33	27	+6	45	
4	CA Batna	30	10	13	7	26	22	+4	43	
5	MO Constantine	30	11	9	10	32	36	−4	42	
6	IB Khémis El Khechna	30	11	8	11	28	26	+2	41	
7	USM El Harrach	30	12	5	13	35	34	+1	41	
8	IRB Ouargla	30	11	8	11	23	32	−9	41	
9	HB Chelghoum Laïd	30	11	6	13	33	32	+1	39	
10	Olympique Magrane	30	11	6	13	28	37	−9	39	
11	AS Khroub	30	9	11	10	35	27	+8	38	
12	USM Annaba	30	8	14	8	33	28	+5	38	
13	NRB Teleghma	30	12	2	16	41	41	0	38	
14	AS Aïn M'lila (R)	30	10	7	13	28	34	−6	37	Relegation to Inter-Régions
15	E Sour El Ghozlane (R)	30	7	8	15	27	49	−22	29	Relegation to Inter-Régions
16	MC El Eulma (R)	30	3	7	20	16	57	−41	16	Relegation to Inter-Régions

Updated to match(es) played on 1 June 2024. Source: lnf-amateur.dz
Rules for classification: 1) points; 2) head-to-head points; 3) head-to-head goal difference; 4) goal difference; 5) total goals; 6) fairplay ranking; 7) playoff.
(C) Champions; (P) Promoted; (R) Relegated

Group Centre West
Pos	Team	Pld	W	D	L	GF	GA	GD	Pts	Promotion or relegation
1	ES Mostaganem (C, P)	30	23	6	1	60	11	+49	75	Ligue 1
2	RC Kouba	30	19	7	4	39	17	+22	64	
3	WA Mostaganem	30	16	8	6	59	28	+31	56	
4	CR Témouchent	30	14	7	9	35	27	+8	49	
5	GC Mascara	30	13	5	12	32	33	−1	43 (Note: GC Mascara were deducted 1 point as punishment for not playing their U-15 games.)	
6	ESM Koléa	30	12	5	13	38	35	+3	41	
7	JSM Tiaret	30	10	10	10	30	33	−3	40	
8	SC Mécheria	30	10	8	12	40	39	+1	38	
9	NA Hussein Dey	30	11	6	13	24	30	−6	38 (Note: NA Hussein Dey were deducted 1 point as punishment for not playing their U-19 games.)	
10	MCB Oued Sly	30	11	5	14	27	35	−8	38	
11	RC Arbaâ	30	11	5	14	37	47	−10	38	
12	SKAF Khemis Miliana	30	11	4	15	42	42	0	37	
13	ASM Oran	30	10	9	11	38	41	−3	37 (Note: ASM Oran were deducted 2 points as punishment for not playing their U-17 and U-19 games.)	
14	WA Boufarik (R)	30	9	9	12	33	36	−3	36	Relegation to Inter-Régions
15	Olympique de Médéa (R)	30	3	8	19	25	57	−32	16 (Note: Olympique de Médéa were deducted 1 point as punishment for not playing their U-19 games.)	Relegation to Inter-Régions
16	JS Guir (R)	30	4	4	22	30	78	−48	15 (Note: JS Guir were deducted 1 point as punishment for not playing their Reserve games.)	Relegation to Inter-Régions

Updated to match(es) played on 1 June 2024. Source: lnf-amateur.dz
Rules for classification: 1) points; 2) head-to-head points; 3) head-to-head goal difference; 4) goal difference; 5) total goals; 6) fairplay ranking; 7) playoff.
(C) Champions; (P) Promoted; (R) Relegated

=== Inter-Régions Division ===
==== West ====
Pos	Team	Pld	W	D	L	GF	GA	GD	Pts	Promotion or relegation
1	MC Saïda (C, P)	30	26	2	2	71	8	+63	80	Ligue 2
2	IRB El Kerma	30	22	6	2	56	23	+33	72	
3	WA Tlemcen	30	18	2	10	54	32	+22	56	
4	USM Bel Abbès	30	13	9	8	42	32	+10	48	
5	JS Bendaoud	30	12	5	13	42	35	+7	41	
6	IS Tighennif	30	11	7	12	33	32	+1	40	
7	US Remchi	30	10	9	11	35	38	−3	39	
8	JS Emir Abdelkader	30	10	7	13	37	43	−6	37	
9	Nasr Es Senia	30	11	4	15	45	62	−17	36 (Note: Nasr Es Senia were deducted 1 point.)	
10	FCB Telagh	30	10	6	14	33	38	−5	36	
11	SCM Oran	30	10	6	14	34	38	−4	36	
12	ES Tighennif	30	9	8	13	32	45	−13	35	
13	ICS Tlemcen	30	9	7	14	36	44	−8	34	
14	RC Relizane	30	9	7	14	32	41	−9	34	Qualification for the Relegation play-off
15	CRB Ben Badis (R)	30	7	10	13	35	42	−7	17 (Note: CRB Ben Badis were deducted 14 points.)	Relegation to Ligue Régional I
16	CRB Hennaya (R)	30	4	3	23	31	95	−64	15	Relegation to Ligue Régional I

Updated to match(es) played on 1 June 2024. Source: lnf-amateur.dz
Rules for classification: 1) points; 2) head-to-head points; 3) head-to-head goal difference; 4) goal difference; 5) total goals; 6) fairplay ranking; 7) playoff.
(C) Champions; (P) Promoted; (R) Relegated

==== Centre West ====
Pos	Team	Pld	W	D	L	GF	GA	GD	Pts	Promotion or relegation
1	JS El Biar (C, P)	30	24	5	1	68	11	+57	77	Ligue 2
2	CR Zaouia	30	15	8	7	42	27	+15	53	
3	CRB Beni Tamou	30	15	7	8	48	42	+6	52	
4	WAB Tissemsilt	30	12	9	9	42	40	+2	45	
5	WB Meftah	30	11	9	10	36	31	+5	42	
6	ORB Oued Fodda	30	12	6	12	39	48	−9	42	
7	RA Ain Defla	30	11	6	13	42	46	−4	39	
8	IR Bouhenni Tiaret	30	11	6	13	51	47	+4	39	
9	IRB Sougueur	30	9	11	10	32	40	−8	38	
10	CRB Aïn Oussera	30	10	8	12	37	38	−1	38	
11	HRB Fouka	30	11	5	14	37	38	−1	38	
12	JS Haï Djabel	30	10	7	13	46	43	+3	37	
13	USM Blida	30	8	10	12	24	30	−6	34	
14	CB Beni Slimane	30	8	8	14	34	47	−13	32	Qualification for the Relegation play-off
15	RCB Oued Rhiou (R)	30	7	8	15	37	57	−20	28 (Note: RCB Oued Rhiou were deducted 1 point.)	Relegation to Ligue Régional I
16	USMM Hadjout (R)	30	7	5	18	33	63	−30	26	Relegation to Ligue Régional I

Updated to match(es) played on 1 June 2024. Source: lnf-amateur.dz
Rules for classification: 1) points; 2) head-to-head points; 3) head-to-head goal difference; 4) goal difference; 5) total goals; 6) fairplay ranking; 7) playoff.
(C) Champions; (P) Promoted; (R) Relegated

==== Centre East ====
Pos	Team	Pld	W	D	L	GF	GA	GD	Pts	Promotion or relegation
1	JS Djijel (C, P)	30	25	5	0	58	14	+44	80	Ligue 2
2	MO Béjaïa	30	20	7	3	59	25	+34	67	
3	JS Boumerdes	30	15	9	6	37	22	+15	54	
4	USM Sétif	30	13	6	11	34	23	+11	45	
5	A Bou Saada	30	11	8	11	30	35	−5	41	
6	AS Bordj Ghedir	30	9	12	9	29	29	0	39	
7	JS Azazga	30	11	5	14	38	36	+2	38	
8	JSM Béjaïa	30	10	8	12	34	38	−4	38	
9	MB Barika	30	9	9	12	35	37	−2	36	
10	USB Berhoum	30	9	8	13	26	36	−10	35	
11	RC Bougaa	30	9	8	13	42	44	−2	35	
12	AB Barika	30	8	11	11	29	35	−6	35	
13	ES Bouakeul	30	9	7	14	42	43	−1	34	
14	IB Lakhdaria	30	7	11	12	33	43	−10	32	Qualification for the Relegation play-off
15	MB Bouira (R)	30	7	6	17	24	57	−33	27	Relegation to Ligue Régional I
16	CRB Ouled Djellal (R)	30	5	6	19	26	59	−33	17 (Note: CRB Ouled Djellal were deducted 4 points.)	Relegation to Ligue Régional I

Updated to match(es) played on 1 June 2024. Source: lnf-amateur.dz
Rules for classification: 1) points; 2) head-to-head points; 3) head-to-head goal difference; 4) goal difference; 5) total goals; 6) fairplay ranking; 7) playoff.
(C) Champions; (P) Promoted; (R) Relegated

==== East ====
Pos	Team	Pld	W	D	L	GF	GA	GD	Pts	Promotion or relegation
1	US Chaouia (C, P)	29	21	2	6	62	29	+33	65	Ligue 2
2	NRBT	29	16	4	9	43	31	+12	52	
3	CB Mila	29	15	5	9	45	30	+15	50	
4	JB Aïn Kercha	29	14	3	12	43	28	+15	45	
5	ES Guelma	29	11	11	7	40	26	+14	44	
6	US Faubourg Constantine	29	12	4	13	55	36	+19	40	
7	CRB Aïn Fakroun	29	11	7	11	41	43	−2	40	
8	WA Zighoud Youcef	29	11	6	12	37	36	+1	39	
9	CRB Aïn Yagout	29	10	9	10	40	37	+3	39	
10	Nasr El Fedjoudj	29	11	6	12	35	37	−2	39	
11	US Boukhadra	29	10	7	12	35	44	−9	37	
12	US Tébessa	29	9	10	10	33	42	−9	37	
13	NRB Beni Oulbane	29	10	5	14	31	56	−25	35	
14	JSM Skikda	29	8	10	11	30	34	−4	34	Qualification for the Relegation play-off
15	HAMRA Annaba (R)	29	8	7	14	32	48	−16	31	Relegation to Ligue Régional I
16	ESB Besbes (R)	15	0	0	15	6	51	−45	−11 (Note: ESB Besbes were declared a general forfeit at the start of the 2023–24 for financial reasons.)	Relegation to Ligue Régional I

Updated to match(es) played on 1 June 2024. Source: lnf-amateur.dz
Rules for classification: 1) points; 2) head-to-head points; 3) head-to-head goal difference; 4) goal difference; 5) total goals; 6) fairplay ranking; 7) playoff.
(C) Champions; (P) Promoted; (R) Relegated

==== South West ====
Pos	Team	Pld	W	D	L	GF	GA	GD	Pts	Promotion or relegation
1	US Béchar Djedid (C, P)	30	23	6	1	78	26	+52	75	Ligue 2
2	CRB Adrar	30	23	4	3	83	27	+56	73	
3	NRB Sbaa	30	12	9	9	42	39	+3	45	
4	IR Mecheria	30	12	7	11	44	36	+8	43	
5	CRB Bougtob	30	13	6	11	39	41	−2	39 (Note: CRB Bougtob were deducted 6 points.)	
6	US Naâma	30	11	6	13	43	60	−17	39	
7	MC Ghassoul	30	10	8	12	47	40	+7	38	
8	IR Makmen Ben Amar	30	11	5	14	33	55	−22	38	
9	A Aïn Sefra	22	10	0	12	45	54	−9	30	
10	NRC Hattaba Adrar	30	10	7	13	40	46	−6	37	
11	NRB Fenoughil	30	11	4	15	43	56	−13	37	
12	CRB Tindouf	30	10	5	15	42	47	−5	35	
13	JRB Taghit	30	9	8	13	37	37	0	35	
14	MC Zaouia Hinoun Aoulef	30	9	7	14	39	48	−9	34	Qualification for the Relegation play-off
15	AR Tabelbala (R)	30	7	8	15	41	54	−13	29	Relegation to Ligue Régional I
16	GC Aïn Sefra (R)	30	7	6	17	35	65	−30	21 (Note: GC Aïn Sefra were deducted 6 points.)	Relegation to Ligue Régional I

Updated to match(es) played on 1 June 2024. Source: lnf-amateur.dz
Rules for classification: 1) points; 2) head-to-head points; 3) head-to-head goal difference; 4) goal difference; 5) total goals; 6) fairplay ranking; 7) playoff.
(C) Champions; (P) Promoted; (R) Relegated

==== South East ====
Pos	Team	Pld	W	D	L	GF	GA	GD	Pts	Promotion or relegation
1	MB Rouissat (C, P)	30	24	3	3	69	16	+53	74 (Note: MB Rouissat were deducted 1 point.)	Ligue 2
2	CR Béni Thour	30	21	6	3	53	19	+34	69	
3	ASB Metlili Châamba	30	17	5	8	52	29	+23	56	
4	IRB Robbah	30	14	6	10	36	31	+5	48	
5	MB Hassi Messaoud	30	13	8	9	34	26	+8	47	
6	USB Hassi R'mel	30	13	7	10	47	32	+15	46	
7	Olympique El Oued	30	9	12	9	35	34	+1	39	
8	CSSW Illizi	30	11	5	14	32	33	−1	38	
9	IRB Zaouia El Abidia	30	7	14	9	37	40	−3	35	
10	IRB Kheneg	30	8	11	11	34	44	−10	34 (Note: IRB Kheneg were deducted 1 point.)	
11	TR Tigdidine	30	9	7	14	33	43	−10	34	
12	IRB Nezla	30	9	6	15	35	40	−5	33	
13	NT Souf	30	10	3	17	22	37	−15	33	
14	NRB Touggourt	30	7	8	15	32	50	−18	29	Qualification for the Relegation play-off
15	UR Hamadine	30	9	2	19	33	67	−34	23 (Note: UR Hamadine were deducted 6 points.)	Qualification for the Relegation play-off
16	MR Hamadine (R)	30	4	7	19	25	68	−43	11 (Note: MR Hamadine were deducted 8 points.)	Relegation to Ligue Régional I

Updated to match(es) played on 1 June 2024. Source: lnf-amateur.dz
Rules for classification: 1) points; 2) head-to-head points; 3) head-to-head goal difference; 4) goal difference; 5) total goals; 6) fairplay ranking; 7) playoff.
(C) Champions; (P) Promoted; (R) Relegated

===== Relegation play-off =====
Pos	Team	Pld	W	D	L	GF	GA	GD	Pts	Promotion or relegation
1	JSM Skikda	29	8	10	11	30	34	−4	34	
2	RC Relizane	30	9	7	14	32	41	−9	34	
3	MC Zaouia Hinoun Aoulef	30	9	7	14	39	48	−9	34	
4	IB Lakhdaria	30	7	11	12	33	43	−10	32	
5	CB Beni Slimane	30	8	8	14	34	47	−13	32	
6	NRB Touggourt	30	7	8	15	32	50	−18	29	Relegation to Ligue Régional I
7	UR Hamadine	30	9	2	19	33	67	−34	23 (Note: UR Hamadine were deducted 6 points.)	Relegation to Ligue Régional I

Updated to match(es) played on 26 June 2021. Source: lnf-amateur.dz
Rules for classification: 1) points; 2) goal difference; 3) number of goals scored.

== National Cups ==
=== Algerian Cup ===
==== Final ====
July 5, 2024
17:00

MC Alger	0–1	CR Belouizdad
	Report	Keddad 42'

Stade du 5 Juillet, Algiers
Referee: Mustapha Ghorbal

== Women's football ==
=== Algerian Women's Championship Elite ===
Pos	Team	Pld	W	D	L	GF	GA	GD	Pts	Qualification or relegation	CFA	JFK	CSC	ASAC	CRB	AR	ASEB	USFB	MZB	ARG
1	CF Akbou (C)	18	15	2	1	79	5	+74	47	Qualification for 2024 CAF W-CL	—	0–1	3–0	5–0	2–0	1–1	7–0	6–0	6–0	12–0
2	JF Khroub	18	13	1	4	70	13	+57	40		1–2	—	2–2	4–0	3–1	1–0	7–1	11–1	5–0	13–0
3	CS Constantine	18	12	1	5	38	17	+21	37		0–3	1–0	—	0–2	1–2	2–0	3–1	7–0	5–0	5–0
4	ASE Alger Centre	18	12	1	5	36	16	+20	37		0–1	1–0	0–2	—	1–1	1–0	5–0	5–0	2–0	2–0
5	CR Belouizdad	18	11	3	4	45	17	+28	36		1–2	1–2	2–0	2–0	—	2–2	7–2	3–0	2–1	7–0
6	Afak Relizane	18	9	3	6	29	15	+14	30		1–1	2–1	0–1	1–2	1–3	—	3–0	3–0	1–0	3–0
7	AS Evasion Béjaïa	18	3	2	13	13	54	−41	11		0–7	0–4	0–1	0–2	0–1	0–2	—	1–1	2–0	2–1
8	USF Béjaïa	18	2	3	13	9	64	−55	9		0–7	0–2	0–3	0–2	0–6	0–1	2–1	—	1–4	2–0
9	MZ Biskra	18	1	4	13	9	47	−38	7		0–4	1–5	2–3	0–6	0–0	0–3	1–1	0–0	—	0–1
10	AR Guelmalol	18	1	2	15	4	84	−80	5		0–10	0–8	0–2	0–5	0–4	0–5	0–2	2–2	0–0	—

Updated to match(es) played on 17 February 2024. Source: lnff.dz
Legend: Blue = home team win; Yellow = draw; Red = away team win.
Rules for classification: 1) Points; 2) Results between teams 3) Goal difference; 4) Number of goals scored
(C) Champions

=== Algerian Women's Championship D1 ===
==== Groupe 1 ====
Pos	Team	Pld	W	D	L	GF	GA	GD	Pts	Qualification or relegation
1	AS Oran Centre	10	7	3	0	29	8	+21	24	Promotion to Championship Elite
2	ASO Chlef	10	7	1	2	16	5	+11	22	
3	Jouharette Canastel	10	4	1	5	16	16	0	13	
4	CVR Blida	10	4	1	5	16	18	−2	13	
5	AS Intissar Oran	10	1	2	7	11	23	−12	5	Relegation to 2024–25 D2 National Champ.
6	SA Bab Ezzouar	0	0	0	0	0	0	0	0	Withdrew (Note: SA Bab Ezzouar that withdrew from all tournaments of the 2023–24 season.)

Updated to match(es) played on 17 June 2024. Source: lnff.dz
Rules for classification: 1) Points; 2) Results between teams 3) Goal difference; 4) Number of goals scored

==== Groupe 2 ====
Pos	Team	Pld	W	D	L	GF	GA	GD	Pts	Qualification or relegation
1	CE Atlétic Sétif	10	6	2	2	11	6	+5	20	Promotion to Championship Elite
2	CNF Boumerdès	10	6	1	3	20	10	+10	19	
3	ALS Batna	10	5	1	4	12	8	+4	16	
4	CM Batna	10	4	2	4	18	15	+3	14	
5	Wafa HMD	10	2	3	5	7	14	−7	9	
6	AC Biskra	10	0	3	7	4	19	−15	3	Relegation to 2024–25 D2 National Champ.

Updated to match(es) played on 17 June 2024. Source: lnff.dz
Rules for classification: 1) Points; 2) Results between teams 3) Goal difference; 4) Number of goals scored

=== Algerian Women's Cup ===
==== Final ====
May 3, 2024
:

CF Akbou	0–0	CS Constantine
	Report
Penalties
	5 - 4

Salem Mabrouki Stadium, Rouïba

=== Algerian Women's League Cup ===
==== Final ====
July 7, 2024
:

CF Akbou	4–2	CR Belouizdad
Alouache 30', 45+3'; Iaouanouguen 40'; Benaïssa 45' (pen.)	Report	Houhèche 5', 66' (pen.)

Salem Mabrouki Stadium, Rouïba

== Managerial changes ==
This is a list of changes of managers within Algerian Ligue Professionnelle 1:

Team	Outgoing manager	Manner of departure	Date of vacancy	Position in table	Incoming manager	Date of appointment
CR Belouizdad	(Tunisia) Nabil Kouki	End of contract	16 July 2023	Pre-season	(Belgium) Sven Vandenbroeck	19 July 2023
JS Saoura	(Algeria) Mounir Zeghdoud	End of contract	16 July 2023	Pre-season	(Algeria) Cherif Hadjar	25 July 2023
US Souf	(Algeria) Réda Bendriss	End of contract	16 July 2023	Pre-season	(Algeria) Omar Belatoui	31 July 2023
ES Sétif	(Algeria) Billel Dziri	End of contract	16 July 2023	Pre-season	(Algeria) Abdelkader Amrani	6 August 2023
ASO Chlef	(Algeria) Abdelkader Amrani	End of contract	16 July 2023	Pre-season	(Algeria) Abdelkader Yaiche	12 August 2023
US Biskra	(Algeria) Mohamed Boutadjine	End of contract	16 July 2023	Pre-season	(Algeria) Mounir Zeghdoud	13 August 2023
MC El Bayadh	(Algeria) Cherif Hadjar	End of contract	16 July 2023	Pre-season	(Algeria) Abdennour Hamici	13 August 2023
NC Magra	(Algeria) Azzedine Aït Djoudi	Sacked	16 July 2023	Pre-season	(Algeria) Aziz Abbès	13 August 2023
USM Khenchela	(Algeria) Nabil Neghiz	End of contract	16 July 2023	Pre-season	(Tunisia) Mourad Okbi	19 August 2023
MC Oran	(Algeria) Omar Belatoui	End of contract	16 July 2023	Pre-season	(Algeria) Kheïreddine Madoui	26 August 2023
ES Sétif	(Algeria) Abdelkader Amrani	Mutual consent	12 September 2023	Pre-season	(France) Franck Dumas	13 September 2023
Paradou AC	(Algeria) Nadhir Leknaoui	Resigned	13 September 2023	Pre-season	(France) Corentin Martins	15 September 2023
NC Magra	(Algeria) Aziz Abbès	Resigned	25 September 2023	16th	(Tunisia) Farouk Janhaoui	30 September 2023
JS Kabylie	(Algeria) Youcef Bouzidi	Mutual consent	1 October 2023	6th	(Portugal) Rui Almeida	14 October 2023
MC El Bayadh	(Algeria) Abdennour Hamici	Mutual consent	2 October 2023	12th	(Algeria) Abdelhaq Belaid	2 October 2023
CS Constantine	(Algeria) Lyamine Bougherara	Mutual consent	3 October 2023	10th	(Algeria) Abdelkader Amrani	21 October 2023
CR Belouizdad	(Belgium) Sven Vandenbroeck	Mutual consent	8 October 2023	11th	(Brazil) Marcos Paquetá	15 October 2023
ASO Chlef	(Algeria) Abdelkader Yaiche	Resigned	9 October 2023	4th	(Tunisia) Kais Yaâkoubi	25 October 2023
USM Alger	(Algeria) Abdelhak Benchikha	Resigned	9 October 2023	16th	(Spain) Juan Carlos Garrido	17 October 2023
ES Ben Aknoun	(Algeria) Abdennour Bousbia	Resigned	11 October 2023	15th	(Algeria) Billel Dziri	11 October 2023
USM Khenchela	(Tunisia) Mourad Okbi	Mutual consent	13 November 2023	4th	(Algeria) Nadhir Leknaoui	15 November 2023
JS Saoura	(Algeria) Cherif Hadjar	Resigned	20 November 2023	11th	(Tunisia) Nacif Beyaoui	22 November 2023
US Souf	(Algeria) Omar Belatoui	Resigned	26 November 2023	15th	(Algeria) Samir Chibane	4 January 2024
USM Khenchela	(Algeria) Nadhir Leknaoui	Mutual consent	18 December 2023	11th	(Tunisia) Yamen Zelfani	14 February 2024
NC Magra	(Tunisia) Farouk Janhaoui	Sacked	20 December 2023	12th	(Algeria) Atef Bettira	20 December 2023
ASO Chlef	(Tunisia) Kais Yaâkoubi	Resigned	10 January 2024	10th	(Algeria) Chérif Hadjar	15 January 2024
MC Oran	(Algeria) Kheïreddine Madoui	Resigned	11 January 2024	15th	(Algeria) Youcef Bouzidi	16 January 2024
JS Kabylie	(Portugal) Rui Almeida	Sacked	25 January 2024	9th	(Algeria) Azzedine Aït Djoudi	25 January 2024
MC El Bayadh	(Algeria) Abdelhaq Belaid	Mutual consent	6 February 2024	10th	(Algeria) El Hadi Khezzar	10 February 2024
ES Sétif	(France) Franck Dumas	Resigned	9 February 2024	4th	(Tunisia) Ammar Souayah	10 February 2024
NC Magra	(Algeria) Atef Bettira	Resigned	14 February 2024	13th	(Algeria) Lyamine Bougherara	10 February 2024
JS Saoura	(Tunisia) Nacif Beyaoui	Resigned	17 February 2024	11th	(Algeria) Fouad Bouali	3 March 2024
MC El Bayadh	(Algeria) El Hadi Khezzar	Resigned	19 March 2024	11th	(Algeria) Larbi Morsli	1 April 2024
Paradou AC	(France) Corentin Martins	Mutual consent	31 March 2024	6th	(Algeria) Abdelkarim Saber Cherif	31 March 2024
USM Khenchela	(Tunisia) Yamen Zelfani	Resigned	4 April 2024	9th	(Algeria) Moufdi Cherdoud	2 May 2024
JS Kabylie	(Algeria) Azzedine Aït Djoudi	Mutual consent	8 April 2024	9th	(Algeria) Abdelkader Bahloul	8 April 2024
MC El Bayadh	(Algeria) Larbi Morsli	Resigned	23 May 2024	11th	(Algeria) Abdelhaq Belaid	23 May 2024

== Deaths ==
- 9 November 2023: Mohamed Laib, 83, former President of USM El Harrach and the Algerian Football Federation.
- 20 December 2023: Zakaria Bouziani, 27, NC Magra, JS Saoura and MC El Bayadh goalkeeper.
- 26 February 2024: Salah Larbès, 71, JS Kabylie defender.
- 15 January 2024: Abderrahmane Zitouni, 54, MC Alger defender.
- 29 March 2024: Habib Benmimoun, 66, MC Oran and USM Bel Abbès defender.
- 5 April 2024: Anouar Oumeriche, Widad Mitidja Boufarik, dies of heart attack.

== Retirements ==
- 13 September 2023: Azzedine Doukha, 37, ASO Chlef, JSM Tiaret, MC Alger, USM El Harrach, JS Kabylie, NA Hussein Dey and CR Belouizdad goalkeeper.
