= Jamal Hamed =

Palestinian footballer (born 2002)

Personal information
- Full name: Jamal Mohammed Abdulrahman Hamed Mayor
- Date of birth: 10 March 2002 (age 24)
- Place of birth: Azpeitia, Spain
- Height: 1.81 m (5 ft 11 in)
- Positions: Left back; winger

Team information
- Current team: Al-Gharafa
- Number: 99

Youth career
- –2021: Leioa

Senior career*
Years	Team	Apps	(Gls)
2021–2022	Leioa	24	(3)
2022–2024	Muaither	25	(4)
2024–	Al-Gharafa	30	(4)

International career^{‡}
2021–2022	Palestine U23	3	(0)
- * Club domestic league appearances and goals as of 17 January 2026 ‡ National team caps and goals as of 25 May 2022

Jamal Mohammed Abdulrahman Hamed Mayor (Arabic: جمال حامد; born 10 March 2002) is a professional footballer who plays as a defender or winger for Al-Gharafa. Born in Spain, he is a Palestine youth international.

== Early life ==
Hamed was born on 10 March 2002 in Azpeitia, Spain and moved with his family to Biscay, Spain at a young age. The son of a Palestinian father and a Spanish mother, he has four brothers, including Palestine international Yaser Hamed.

== Club career ==
As a youth player, Hamed joined the youth academy of Spanish side Leioa and was promoted to the club's senior team in 2021, where he made twenty-three league appearances and scored three goals. One year later, he signed for Qatari side Muaither, helping the club achieve promotion from the second tier to the top flight. In 2024, he signed for Qatari side Al-Gharafa.

== International career ==
Hamed is a Palestine youth international. During October 2021, he played for the Palestine national under-23 football team for 2022 AFC U-23 Asian Cup qualification.
