= Yaser Hamed =

Palestinian footballer (born 1997)

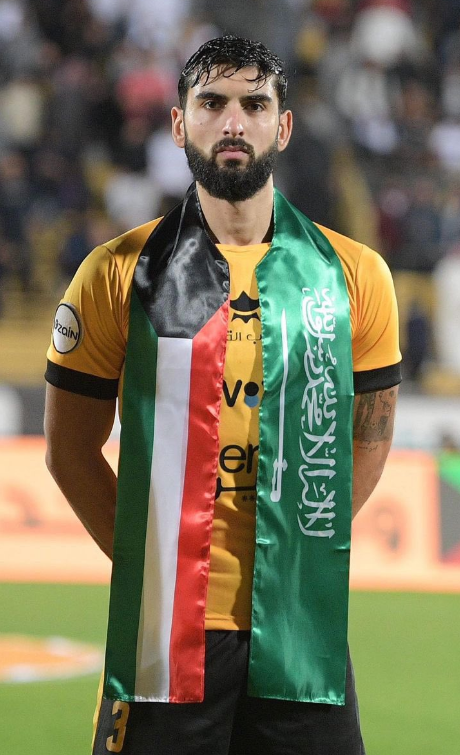
- Hamed with Al-Qadsia in 2023

Personal information
- Full name: Yaser Mohammed Abdulrahman Hamed
- Birth name: Yaser Hamed Mayor
- Date of birth: 9 December 1997 (age 28)
- Place of birth: Leioa, Spain
- Height: 1.88 m (6 ft 2 in)
- Position: Centre-back

Team information
- Current team: Al-Khor
- Number: 97

Youth career
- 2007–2012: Athletic Bilbao
- 2012–2013: Romo
- 2013–2014: Itzubaltzeta
- 2014–2015: Romo
- 2015–2016: Arenas

Senior career*
Years	Team	Apps	(Gls)
2016–2017	Gallarta		
2017–2018	Santurtzi	2	(0)
2018–2019	Leioa	1	(0)
2018–2020	Portugalete	50	(2)
2020–2021	Busaiteen		
2022	Al-Masry	8	(2)
2022–2023	Al-Rayyan	6	(0)
2023	Al-Qadsia		
2023	NorthEast United	8	(0)
2024	Zamalek	2	(0)
2025	Al-Gharafa	0	(0)
2026–	Al-Khor	4	(0)

International career^{‡}
2019–	Palestine	35	(5)
- * Club domestic league appearances and goals as of 30 April 2026 ‡ National team caps and goals as of 14 November 2026

Yaser Mohammed Abdulrahman Hamed (Arabic: يَاسِر مُحَمَّد عَْبد الرَّحْمٰن حَامِد; born 9 December 1997) is a professional footballer who plays as a centre-back for Qatari club Al-Khor. Born in Spain, he plays for the Palestine national team.

== Club career ==
The second of five sons born to a Palestinian father and a Basque mother and a product of the esteemed Athletic Bilbao academy which he joined at 10 years of age and departed at 15, Hamed has gone on to play for various Basque sides in the third and fourth tier of Spanish football including CD Santurtzi, SD Leioa, and Club Portugalete. He was in the Portugalete team which won their league group in 2018–19 but failed to achieve promotion in the play-offs, and was still with them the following season when they managed to follow up a second successive title with promotion; however Hamed left the club at the end of that season.

In January 2022, he transferred to Egyptian Premier League side, Al Masry on a two-and-a-half-year contract. He scored his first goal on 20 February, in a 2–0 win against TP Mazembe.

He transferred to Qatari club Al-Rayyan in August 2022, where he joined players like James Rodríguez. Hamed, however, left the club at the beginning of the year. In 2023, he played for Al Qadsia in Kuwait and NorthEast United in India.

In February 2024, Hamed joined Egyptian club Zamalek. He made his debut in a 2–1 CAF Confederation Cup win over Abu Salim.

== International career ==
Hamed was first contacted by the Palestine national team in July 2019 and made his debut in a 1–0 win over Yemen in the 2019 WAFF Championship. Hamed scored the lone goal in that game. He went on to play every single minute of the tournament, helping Palestine record their best ever showing at a WAFF Championship finishing behind Iraq with a record of two wins, one draw, and one loss. Hamed scored his second national team goal two months later in a 2022 FIFA World Cup qualification match against Singapore.

On 1 January 2024, he was named in the Palestinian squad for the 2023 AFC Asian Cup in Qatar.

== Personal life ==
His little brother Jamal is also a professional footballer.

== Career statistics ==
=== International ===
As of match played 5 September 2021
Scores and results list Palestine's goal tally first, score column indicates score after each Hamed goal.

List of international goals scored by Yaser Hamed
No.	Date	Venue	Opponent	Score	Result	Competition	Ref.
1	30 July 2019	Karbala International Stadium, Karbala, Iraq	Yemen	1–0	1–0	2019 WAFF Championship	
2	10 September 2019	Jalan Besar Stadium, Kallang, Singapore	Singapore	1–1	1–2	2022 FIFA World Cup qualification	
3	3 June 2021	King Fahd International Stadium, Riyadh, Saudi Arabia	Singapore	4–0	4–0	2022 FIFA World Cup qualification	
4	15 June 2021	King Fahd International Stadium, Riyadh, Saudi Arabia	Yemen	2–0	3–0	2022 FIFA World Cup qualification	
5	5 September 2021	Dolen Omurzakov Stadium, Bishkek, Kyrgyzstan	Bangladesh	2–0	2–0	Friendly	

== Honours ==
Zamalek

- CAF Confederation Cup: 2023–24
