= Abdelhak Assal =

Moroccan footballer (born 1998)

Personal information
- Date of birth: 8 June 1998 (age 28)
- Place of birth: Casablanca, Morocco
- Height: 1.90 m (6 ft 3 in)
- Position: Centre-back

Team information
- Current team: RS Berkane
- Number: 15

Youth career
- TAS de Casablanca

Senior career*
Years	Team	Apps	(Gls)
2019–2020	TAS de Casablanca	10	(0)
2020–2023	SCC Mohammédia	61	(1)
2023–	RS Berkane	59	(0)

International career^{‡}
2022	Morocco A'	1	(0)
- * Club domestic league appearances and goals as of 27 May 2025 ‡ National team caps and goals as of 27 May 2025

Abdelhak Assal (Arabic: Arabic: عبد الحق عسل; born 8 June 1998) is a Moroccan professional footballer who plays as a central defender for RS Berkane.

== Club career ==
Born in Casablanca, Assal began his professional career in the Botola 2 with his boyhood club TAS de Casablanca.

On 1 November 2020, he signed a three-year deal with SCC Mohammédia. He made his top-flight debut on 4 December 2020 against MA Tétouan (2–0 win). On 26 February 2021, he scored an own goal against FAR Rabat (1–1 draw). His first professional goal came on 30 May 2021 against MC Oujda in a 3–2 defeat.

On 4 August 2023, Assal joined RS Berkane. During the 2024–25 Botola season, he won the Botola Pro title and the CAF Confederation Cup.

== International career ==
In August 2022, Assal was called up to the Morocco A' team by coach Houcine Ammouta for a friendly match against Jamaica in Austria (3–0 win).

On 27 May 2025, he received his first call-up to the senior Morocco squad by Walid Regragui for June friendlies against Tunisia and Benin.

== Honours ==
=== Morocco ===
- African Nations Championship: 2024

=== RS Berkane ===
- Botola Pro:
  - Champion: 2024–25
- CAF Confederation Cup:
  - Winner: 2025
  - Runner-up: 2024
