= Hamdy Alaa =

Egyptian footballer (born 2000)

Personal information
- Full name: Hamdy Alaa
- Date of birth: 1 October 2000 (age 26)
- Position: Midfielder

Team information
- Current team: Zamalek

Youth career
- –2022: Zamalek

Senior career*
Years	Team	Apps	(Gls)
2022–	Zamalek	1	(0)

International career
	Egypt U20	0	(0)
- * Club domestic league appearances and goals

Hamdy Alaa (Arabic: حَمْدِيّ عَلَاء; born 1 October 2000) is an Egyptian professional footballer who plays as a midfielder for Egyptian Premier League club Zamalek.
