= Mohab Yaser =

Egyptian footballer (born 1994)

Personal information
- Full name: Mohab Yaser
- Date of birth: 18 March 1997 (age 29)
- Position: Midfielder

Team information
- Current team: Zamalek
- Number: 26

Senior career*
Years	Team	Apps	(Gls)
2014–2024	El Dakhleya SC		
2024–	Zamalek		
- * Club domestic league appearances and goals

Mohab Yaser (Arabic: مهاب ياسر; born 18 March 1997) is an Egyptian professional footballer who plays as a midfielder for Egyptian Premier League club Zamalek.

== Honours ==
Zamalek

- Egypt Cup: 2024–25
- CAF Super Cup: 2024
