= Mohamed El Mourabit =

French professional footballer

Personal information
- Date of birth: 11 September 1998 (age 28)
- Place of birth: Morocco
- Height: 1.79 m (5 ft 10 in)
- Position: Forward

Senior career*
Years	Team	Apps	(Gls)
2015–2020	Olympic Safi	102	(3)
2020–2022	Chabab Mohamedia	28	(0)
2022	Raja Casablanca	4	(0)

International career
2017–2018	Morocco U20	5	(1)
2018–	Morocco U23	2	(0)
- * Club domestic league appearances and goals as of 11 November 2022

Mohamed El Mourabit (Arabic: محمد المرابط; born 11 September 1998) is a Moroccan professional footballer who plays as a forward.
