= Ali Yasser =

Egyptian footballer (born 2003)

Ali Yasser (Arabic: على ياسر; born 25 May 2003) is an Egyptian professional footballer who plays as a forward.
