= Ahmed Hamdi (footballer) =

Egyptian footballer (born 1998)

Personal information
- Full name: Ahmed Hamdi Hussein Hafez
- Date of birth: 10 February 1998 (age 28)
- Place of birth: Cairo, Egypt
- Height: 1.78 m (5 ft 10 in)
- Position: Attacking midfielder

Youth career
- 2005–2015: Al Ahly

Senior career*
Years	Team	Apps	(Gls)
2015–2019	Al Ahly	14	(1)
2019	→ El Gouna (loan)	14	(1)
2019–2021	El Gouna	26	(6)
2021	→ CF Montréal (loan)	19	(2)
2021–2023	CF Montréal	13	(0)
2024–2026	Zamalek	13	(1)

International career
2017	Egypt U20	3	(0)
2019	Egypt U23	1	(0)
- * Club domestic league appearances and goals as of 30 June 2026

Ahmed Hamdi Hussein Hafez (Arabic: أحمد حمدي حسين حافظ; born 10 February 1998) is an Egyptian professional footballer who plays as an attacking midfielder.

== Career ==
Hamdy is a product of the Al Ahly youth system. On 18 December 2015, he made his debut with Al-Ahly in a 2015–16 Egyptian Premier League match against Smouha SC under José Peseiro. He started the match before being substituted in the second half.

On 4 February 2021, Hamdy joined Canadian Major League Soccer club CF Montréal on loan for the 2021 season. On 19 October 2021, Montréal announced they had exercised their purchase option on Hamdy.

Upon completion of the 2023 Season, CF Montréal would announce that they would not pick up Hamdi's contract for 2024, ending his time with the club.

In January 2024, Hamdy joined Zamalek. Later that year, on 19 May, he scored the only goal in a 1–0 victory over RS Berkane in the CAF Confederation Cup final second leg, which granted his club their second title in the competition by winning on away goals rule following a 2–2 draw on aggregate.

== Honours ==
Montreal Impact

- Canadian Championship: 2021

Zamalek

- Egyptian Premier League: 2025–26
- CAF Confederation Cup: 2023–24
