= Samson Akinyoola =

Beninese footballer (born 2000)

Personal information
- Full name: Samson Olanrewaju Akinyoola
- Date of birth: 3 March 2000 (age 26)
- Place of birth: Porto-Novo, Benin
- Height: 1.70 m (5 ft 7 in)
- Position: Forward

Youth career
- 36 Lion FC
- 2019: → Dunajská Streda (loan)

Senior career*
Years	Team	Apps	(Gls)
2019–2020	Senica	21	(5)
2021–2022	Caracas	67	(28)
2022–2024	Zamalek	37	(5)

International career^{‡}
2018	Benin U20	1+	(2)
2022–	Benin	2	(0)
- * Club domestic league appearances and goals as of 7 November 2024 ‡ National team caps and goals as of 13 October 2025

Samson Olanrewaju Akinyoola (born 3 March 2000) is a Beninese footballer who plays as a forward.

== Club career ==
Akinyoola made his Fortuna Liga debut for Senica against DAC Dunajská Streda on 14 September 2019.

In 2021 he moved to Caracas.

On summer 2024, he terminated his contract with Zamalek.

== International career ==
Akinyoola represented Benin at the 2019 Africa U-20 Cup of Nations qualification.

== Personal life ==
Akinyoola also holds Nigerian citizenship.

== Honours ==
Zamalek

- CAF Confederation Cup: 2023–24
- CAF Super Cup: 2024
