= Hamza Mathlouthi =

Tunisian footballer (born 1992)

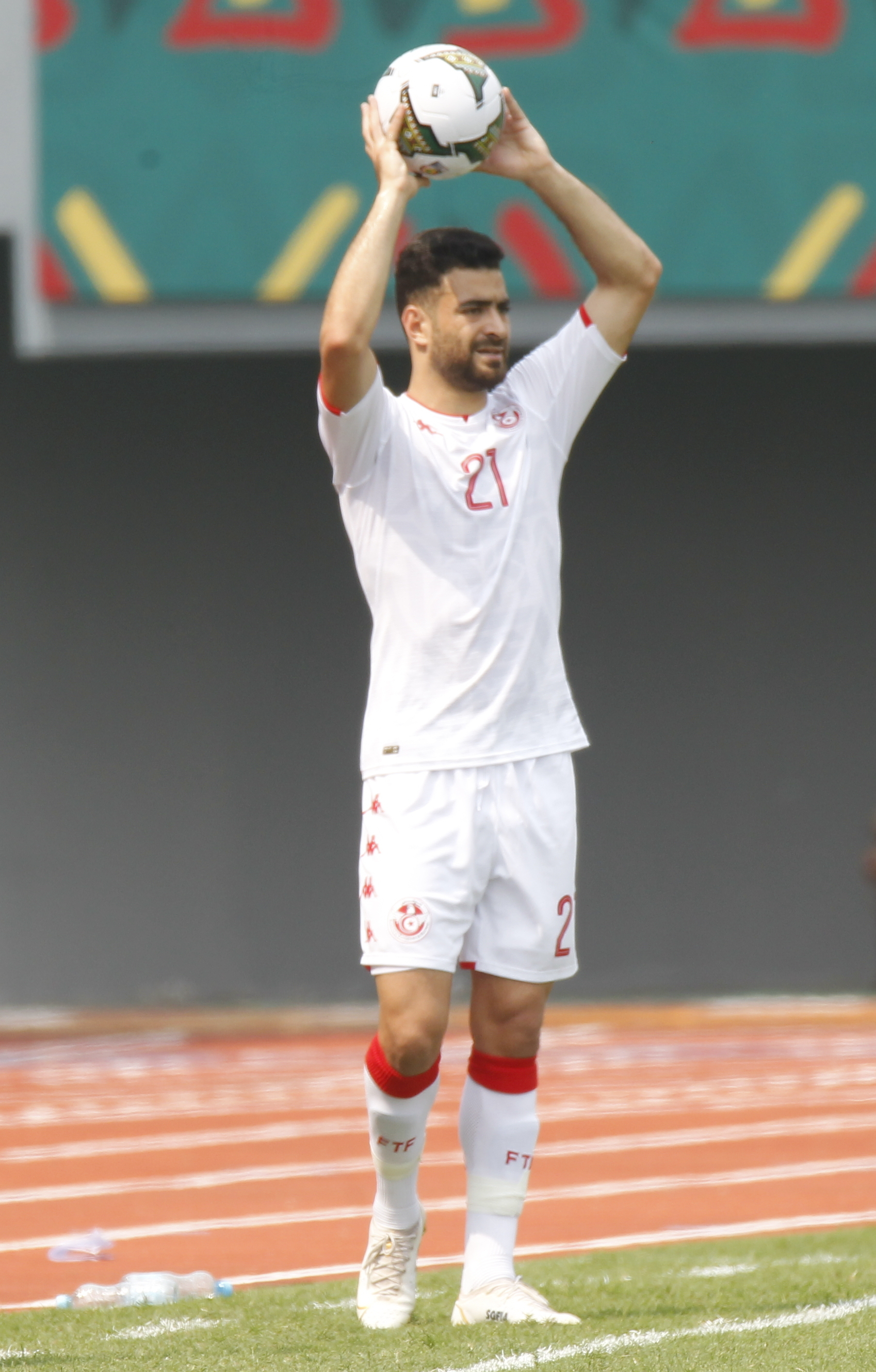
- Mathlouthi with Tunisia in 2022

Personal information
- Full name: Hamza Mathlouthi
- Date of birth: 25 July 1992 (age 34)
- Place of birth: Bizerte, Tunisia
- Height: 1.84 m (6 ft 0 in)
- Positions: Right-back; center-back

Team information
- Current team: CS Sfaxien
- Number: 24

Senior career*
Years	Team	Apps	(Gls)
2010–2016	CA Bizertin	110	(2)
2016–2020	CS Sfaxien	79	(6)
2020–2025	Zamalek	67	(0)
2025–	CS Sfaxien	21	(4)

International career^{‡}
2014–	Tunisia	38	(1)
Medal record
Representing Tunisia
Men's football
FIFA Arab Cup
Runner-up	2021 Qatar
- * Club domestic league appearances and goals as of 20 May 2026 ‡ National team caps and goals as of 30 May 2024

Hamza Mathlouthi (Arabic: حَمْزَة الْمَثْلُوثِيّ; born 25 July 1992) is a Tunisian professional footballer who plays as a right-back for CS Sfaxien.

== Club career ==
Mathlouthi started his career playing for CA Bizertin, he later played for CS Sfaxien, before joining Egyptian club Zamalek SC in 2020. It wasn't that long until Jesualdo Ferreira rediscovered him as a centre-back, since then, He's been leading Zamalek's defence.

== International career ==
Mathlouthi was part of the Tunisian squad in the 2015, 2017 and 2021 Africa Cup of Nations tournaments. He scored his first goal for his country in the 2021 tournament (played in January 2022) against Mauritania in Limbe.

== Honours ==
CA Bizertin

- Tunisian Ligue Professionnelle 1: runner-up 2011–12

Zamalek

- Egyptian Premier League 2020–21, 2021-22
- Egypt Cup: 2021, 2025
- CAF Confederation Cup: 2023–24
- CAF Super Cup: 2024

== Career statistics ==
=== International ===
List of international goals scored by Hamza Mathlouthi
No.	Date	Venue	Opponent	Score	Result	Competition
1	16 January 2022	Limbe Stadium, Limbe, Cameroon	Mauritania	1–0	4–0	2021 Africa Cup of Nations
