= Ibrahima Ndiaye (footballer) =

Senegalese footballer (born 1998)

Personal information
- Date of birth: 6 July 1998 (age 28)
- Place of birth: Saint-Louis, Senegal
- Height: 1.76 m (5 ft 9 in)
- Position: Forward

Senior career*
Years	Team	Apps	(Gls)
2015−2016	ASC Diaraf	0	(0)
2016−2019	Wadi Degla	72	(20)
2017−2018	→ Ergotelis (loan)	10	(1)
2019−2022	Luzern	93	(18)
2022–2024	Al Zamalek	34	(8)
2024–2025	Al-Hazem	29	(8)
2025–2026	Al-Faisaly	7	(2)

International career
2016−2017	Senegal U-20	8	(1)
2019	Senegal U-23	2	(1)
- * Club domestic league appearances and goals as of 27 August 2022

Ibrahima Ndiaye (born 6 July 1998) is a Senegalese professional footballer who last plays as a forward.

== Career ==
=== Club ===
Ndiaye began playing football in his home country Senegal, playing for Linguère during the 2014−15 season. Already being considered a strong prospect for the Senegalese national team, he was acquired by Senegalese Premier League powerhouse Jaraaf for the 2015−16 season. He then left Senegal to join Egyptian club Wadi Degla in August 2016, despite reported interest from European clubs. He scored his first goal in the Egyptian Premier League against El Sharkia on 30 October 2016. He went on to feature in a total of 28 matches, scoring 4 goals for his club.

In August 2017 Ndiaye was loaned out to Greek Football League club Ergotelis, also owned by Wadi Degla's president Maged Samy. He arrived in Heraklion almost 2,5 months later due to bureaucratic reasons concerning the issuing of his visa for Greece. On 4 December 2017 he scored his first goal for the club in a 2 − 4 Cretan derby home loss against OFI.

In January 2018, Ndiaye reached an agreement with the club's management and board of directors to return to Wadi Degla, citing personal reasons as the reason for his departure. In total, he played 11 games with Ergotelis and scored one goal. In his return to Wadi Degla, Ndiaye scored 5 goals and had 1 assist in 13 games, making a significant contribution to his club's eventual relegation avoidance.

On 31 August 2025, Ndiaye joined Saudi First Division side Al-Faisaly.

=== International ===
Ndiaye has represented Senegal with the U-20 outfit in both the 2017 Africa U-20 Cup of Nations and the 2017 FIFA U-20 World Cup. He came under scrutiny at the 2017 Africa U-20 Cup of Nations held in Zambia after allegedly tossing an object he had in his socks into the Zambian goal during the competition final. Many suspected that he was using Juju or some charms, an allegation that was then brushed aside by Senegal coach Joseph Koto. The Zambian side was vigilant enough to throw out the object which was suspected to be a witchcraft related charm. Senegal went on to lose the game 0–2 to the hosts.
