= Seifeddine Jaziri =

Tunisian footballer (born 1993)

Personal information
- Full name: Seifeddine Jaziri
- Date of birth: 12 February 1993 (age 33)
- Place of birth: Tunis, Tunisia
- Height: 1.80 m (5 ft 11 in)
- Position: Forward

Team information
- Current team: Hatta Club
- Number: 30

Youth career
- –2011: Club Africain

Senior career*
Years	Team	Apps	(Gls)
2011–2017	Club Africain	52	(6)
2013–2014	→ CS Hammam-Lif (loan)	20	(1)
2017	→ US Ben Guerdane (loan)	2	(0)
2017–2018	Tanta	28	(7)
2018–2019	Stade Gabèsien	9	(2)
2019–2021	Al Mokawloon Al Arab	52	(17)
2021	→ Zamalek (loan)	19	(4)
2021–2026	Zamalek	89	(27)
2026-	Hatta Club	2	(0)

International career^{‡}
2016–	Tunisia	39	(11)
Medal record
Representing Tunisia
Men's football
FIFA Arab Cup
Runner-up	2021 Qatar
- * Club domestic league appearances and goals as of 23 August 2026 ‡ National team caps and goals as of 24 March 2025

Seifeddine Jaziri (Arabic: سيف الدين الجزيري; born 12 February 1993) is a Tunisian professional footballer who plays as a forward for Hatta Club and the Tunisia national team.

== Career statistics ==
=== Club ===
As of match played 28 January 2025

Appearances and goals by club, season and competition
Club	Season	League			Egypt Cup		Continental		Other		Total	
Club	Season	Division	Apps	Goals	Apps	Goals	Apps	Goals	Apps	Goals	Apps	Goals
Tanta	2017–18	Egyptian Premier League	28	7	1	0	—		—		29	7
Al Mokawloon Al Arab	2018–19	Egyptian Premier League	14	3	0	0	—		—		14	3
Al Mokawloon Al Arab	2019–20	Egyptian Premier League	30	11	2	0	—		—		32	11
Al Mokawloon Al Arab	2020–21	Egyptian Premier League	8	3	0	0	3 (Note: Appearances in CAF Confederation Cup)	3	—		11	6
Al Mokawloon Al Arab	Total		52	17	2	0	3	3	—		57	20
Zamalek	2020–21	Egyptian Premier League	19	4	4	0	—		—		23	4
Zamalek	2021–22	Egyptian Premier League	26	9	2	0	8 (Note: Appearances in CAF Champions League)	1	1 (Note: Appearance in Egypt Super Cup)	0	37	10
Zamalek	2022–23	Egyptian Premier League	27	7	4	4	8	1	—		39	12
Zamalek	2023–24	Egyptian Premier League	17	7	0	0	12	2	3 (Note: Appearances in Arab Club Champions Cup)	0	32	9
Zamalek	2024–25	Egyptian Premier League	7	2	0	0	6	3	3 (Note: Two appearances and one goal in Egypt Super Cup, one appearance in CAF Super Cup)	1	16	6
Zamalek	Total		96	29	10	4	34	7	7	1	147	41
Career total			171	52	13	4	37	10	7	1	228	67

=== International ===
Scores and results list Tunisia's goal tally first, score column indicates score after each Jaziri goal.

List of international goals scored by Seifeddine Jaziri
No.	Date	Venue	Opponent	Score	Result	Competition
1	25 March 2021	Martyrs of February Stadium, Benghazi, Libya	Libya	2–1	5–2	2021 Africa Cup of Nations qualification
2	25 March 2021	Martyrs of February Stadium, Benghazi, Libya	Libya	5–2	5–2	2021 Africa Cup of Nations qualification
3	28 March 2021	Hammadi Agrebi Stadium, Tunis, Tunisia	Equatorial Guinea	1–0	2–1	2021 Africa Cup of Nations qualification
4	7 October 2021	Hammadi Agrebi Stadium, Tunis, Tunisia	Mauritania	3–0	3–0	2022 FIFA World Cup qualification
5	30 November 2021	Ahmed bin Ali Stadium, Al Rayyan, Qatar	Mauritania	1–0	5–1	2021 FIFA Arab Cup
6	30 November 2021	Ahmed bin Ali Stadium, Al Rayyan, Qatar	Mauritania	3–0	5–1	2021 FIFA Arab Cup
7	6 December 2021	Al Thumama Stadium, Al Thumama, Qatar	United Arab Emirates	1–0	1–0	2021 FIFA Arab Cup
8	10 December 2021	Education City Stadium, Al Rayyan, Qatar	Oman	1–0	2–1	2021 FIFA Arab Cup
9	16 January 2022	Limbe Stadium, Limbe, Cameroon	Mauritania	4–0	4–0	2021 Africa Cup of Nations
10	2 June 2022	Hammadi Agrebi Stadium, Tunis, Tunisia	Equatorial Guinea	2–0	4–0	2023 Africa Cup of Nations qualification
11	24 March 2025	Hammadi Agrebi Stadium, Tunis, Tunisia	Malawi	1–0	2–0	2026 FIFA World Cup qualification

== Honours ==
Club Africain

- Tunisian Ligue Professionnelle 1: 2014–15
- Tunisian Cup: 2016–17

Zamalek

- Egyptian Premier League 2020–21, 2021–22, 2025–26
- Egypt Cup: 2020–21, 2024–25
- CAF Confederation Cup: 2023–24
- CAF Super Cup: 2024

Tunisia

- Kirin Cup Soccer: 2022
- FIFA Arab Cup runner-up: 2021

Individual

- FIFA Arab Cup Golden Boot: 2021
- FIFA Arab Cup Team of the Tournament: 2021
