= Adil Tahif =

Moroccan footballer (born 2001)

Personal information
- Full name: Adil Tahif
- Date of birth: 24 February 2001 (age 25)
- Place of birth: Casablanca, Morocco
- Height: 1.81 m (5 ft 11 in)
- Position: Centre-back

Team information
- Current team: Umm Salal
- Number: 15

Youth career
- 2010–2019: AM Academy
- 2019–2020: Leganés U19

Senior career*
Years	Team	Apps	(Gls)
2020–2021	Leganés B	15	(2)
2021–2022	Chabab Mohammédia	23	(1)
2022–2025	RS Berkane	106	(6)
2025–2026	Umm Salal	8	(0)
2026–	RS Berkane	0	(0)

International career^{‡}
2017	Morocco U17	4	(0)
2021–2022	Morocco U20	7	(0)
2022–2024	Morocco U23	8	(0)
2022	Morocco	1	(0)
- * Club domestic league appearances and goals as of 17 January 2026 ‡ National team caps and goals as of 03:15, 20 July 2025 (UTC)

Adil Tahif (Arabic: عادل تاحيف; born 24 February 2001) is a Moroccan professional footballer who plays for Umm Salal. He was selected for the Moroccan national team at the 2024 Summer Olympics.
