= Abu Salim SC =

Association football club in Libya

Abu Salim
- Full name: Abu Salim Sports Club
- Founded: 1976; 49 years ago (as Abu Salem Sports Club)
- Ground: Abu Salim Stadium
- Capacity: 5,000
- Head coach: Sérgio Traguil
- League: Libyan Premier League

Abu Salem SC (also known as Abu Salim) is a professional football club based in Abu Salim, Tripoli, Libya.

From its founding in 1976, the club has traditionally worn a yellow home kit.

The 2018–19 Abu Salem SC season was the first edition of the club in the Premier League, the top tier in the Libyan football system founded in 1963.
