= Berkane Municipal Stadium =

Stadium in Berkane, Morocco

- Interactive map of Berkane Municipal Stadium
- Location: Berkane, Morocco
- Coordinates: 34°55′N 2°19′W
- Capacity: 15,000
- Surface: Artificial turf

Construction
- Opened: 2014
- Renovated: 2017

Tenant
- RS Berkane (2014–present)

Berkane Municipal Stadium (Arabic: الملعب البلدي ببركان, French: Stade municipal de Berkane) is a football-specific stadium in Berkane, Morocco.

It is the home stadium of Botola Pro side RS Berkane, and was one of the venues used when Morocco hosted the 2024 Women's Africa Cup of Nations. It has also hosted several qualifying matches for the 2026 World Cup and 2025 Africa Cup of Nations. The stadium has a capacity of 15,000 after being renovated in 2017.

Since January 2025, the National Company for the Construction and Management of Sports Equipment (SONARGES) is in charge of managing the facilities. And from June 2025, the football club acquired ownership of the stadium.
