= Issa Sy =

Senegalese association football referee

- Full name: Issa Sy
- Born: July 22, 1984 (age 42); Senegal

Domestic
Years	League	Role
201x–present	Senegal Premier League	Referee

International
Years	League	Role
2015–present	FIFA Listed	Referee

Issa Sy (born 22 July 1984) is a Senegalese football referee. He has been a FIFA-listed referee since 2015 and regularly officiates matches in international competitions organized by both FIFA and the CAF.

== Refereeing career ==
Sy was added to the FIFA international referees list in 2015, making him eligible to officiate matches in international competitions and World Cup qualifiers.

Sy has officiated at multiple editions of the Africa Cup of Nations. He refereed one group stage match at the 2019 Africa Cup of Nations in Egypt and one match at the 2021 Africa Cup of Nations in Cameroon. At the 2025 Africa Cup of Nations in Morocco, Sy was appointed to several key roles. He officiated the group matches Egypt vs Zimbabwe and Morocco vs Zambia, worked as a Video Assistant Referee (VAR) in Morocco vs Tanzania, and was selected to referee the quarter-final between Algeria and Nigeria.

In 2025, Sy was selected by FIFA as one of the African referees to officiate at the FIFA Club World Cup 2025 in the United States, highlighting his standing within the global refereeing community.

Sy has officiated matches in CAF qualifying competitions for the 2022 FIFA World Cup and 2026 FIFA World Cup. For example, he was appointed to oversee the 2026 World Cup qualifying fixture between Madagascar and Ghana.

Aside from national team tournaments, Sy has been appointed to referee high-profile fixtures in CAF club competitions such as the CAF Champions League, including matches involving top teams like Espérance Sportive de Tunis and Mamelodi Sundowns.

== Other officiating roles ==
In addition to his on-field responsibilities, Sy has also served in VAR roles during major competitions.
