= 2023–24 Pyramids FC season =

Pyramids FC
2023–24 season
- Head coach: Jaime Pacheco (until 5 February); Krunoslav Jurčić (from 7 February)
- Stadium: 30 June Stadium
- Egyptian Premier League: 2nd
- 2023–24 Egypt Cup: Winners
- Egyptian League Cup: Quarter-finals
- Egyptian Super Cup: Third-place
- CAF Champions League: Group stage
- Top goalscorer: League: Fiston Mayele (17); All: Fiston Mayele (19)
- Biggest win: Pyramids 6–1 APR
- Biggest defeat: TP Mazembe 3–0 Pyramids
Home colours	Away colours	Third colours

The 2023–24 Pyramids FC season was the club's sixth season in existence and the sixth consecutive season in the top flight of Egyptian football. In addition to the domestic league, Pyramids participated in this season's editions of the Egypt Cup, the League Cup, the Egyptian Super Cup, and the CAF Champions League.

== Kits ==
Supplier: Puma / Main sponsor: MyWhoosh

Home	Home alternate	Away	Third

Goalkeeper	Goalkeeper alternate

== Players ==
=== First-team squad ===
As of 20 September 2023

Note: Flags indicate national team as defined under FIFA eligibility rules; some limited exceptions apply. Players may hold more than one non-FIFA nationality.

No.	Pos.	Nation	Player
—	GK	EGY	Sherif Ekramy
—	GK	EGY	Ahmed El Shenawy
—	GK	EGY	Ahmed Mayhoub
—	DF	MAR	Mohamed Chibi
—	DF	EGY	Ali Gabr
—	DF	EGY	Ahmed Samy
—	DF	EGY	Mahmoud Marei
—	DF	EGY	Mohamed Hamdy
—	DF	EGY	Ahmed Fathy
—	DF	EGY	Karim Hafez
—	MF	BFA	Blati Touré
—	MF	EGY	Ramadan Sobhi
—	MF	EGY	Mostafa Fathi

No.	Pos.	Nation	Player
—	MF	EGY	Mohanad Lasheen
—	MF	MAR	Walid El Karti
—	MF	EGY	Abdallah El Said (captain)
—	MF	EGY	Seif Farouk Gaafar
—	MF	EGY	Youssef Osama
—	MF	EGY	Ibrahim Adel
—	MF	EGY	Mohamed Reda
—	MF	EGY	Ahmed Tawfik
—	MF	EGY	Islam Issa
—	FW	COD	Fiston Mayele
—	FW	RSA	Fagrie Lakay
—	FW	EGY	Mohamed El Gabbas
—	MF	EGY	Mohamed Adel Amo

== Transfers ==
=== In ===
Pos.	Player	Transferred from	Fee	Date	Source
MF	(Egypt) Mostafa Fathi	(Saudi Arabia) Al-Taawoun	€903,000	24 July 2023	
FW	(Democratic Republic of the Congo) Fiston Mayele	(Tanzania) Young Africans	Undisclosed	30 July 2023	
MF	(Egypt) Youssef Osama	(Egypt) Zamalek	Free	4 August 2023	
MF	(Egypt) Seif Farouk Gaafar	(Egypt) Zamalek	Free	8 August 2023	
MF	(Egypt) Mohanad Lasheen	(Egypt) Future	€1,003,000	10 August 2023	
MF	(Egypt) Mohamed Reda	(Egypt) Future	€1,000,000	14 August 2023	
MF	(Egypt) Mohamed Adel Amo	(Egypt) Misr Lel Makkasa	€118,000	15 August 2023	
GK	(Egypt) Ahmed Mayhoub	(Egypt) Ghazl El Mahalla	€118,000	30 August 2023	

=== Out ===
Pos.	Player	Transferred to	Fee	Date	Source
MF	(Egypt) Ahmed Fawzi	(Egypt) Al Mokawloon Al Arab	Loan	16 August 2023	
MF	(Egypt) Emad Mayhoub	(Egypt) Al Mokawloon Al Arab	Loan	16 August 2023	
GK	(Egypt) Ahmed Daador	(Egypt) Ceramica Cleopatra	Loan	18 August 2023	
FW	(Palestine) Mahmoud Wadi	(Egypt) Al Mokawloon Al Arab	Free	19 August 2023	
FW	(Tunisia) Fakhreddine Ben Youssef	(Egypt) Al Masry	Free	26 August 2023	
MF	(Egypt) Mohamed Adel Amo	(Egypt) Misr Lel Makkasa	Loan	1 September 2023	
MF	(Egypt) Abdallah El Said	(Egypt) Zamalek	€448,000	31 January 2024	

== Pre-season and friendlies ==
Win Draw Loss Fixtures

In preparation for the new season, Pyramids held a training camp in Adana, Turkey, which started on 25 August. International players were allowed to leave to join their national teams.

29 August 2023 Friendly	Limassol TG (Cyprus)	0–8	(Egypt) Pyramids	Burdur, Turkey
		Report	Osama; Lakay; El Said; Adel; El Gabbas; Saber	Stadium: Makü stadyumu

31 August 2023 Friendly	Varsak Antalya (Turkey)	0–7	(Egypt) Pyramids	Burdur, Turkey
				Stadium: Makü stadyumu

2 September 2023 Friendly	Altınordu (Turkey)	0–1	(Egypt) Pyramids	Burdur, Turkey
			Mayele

6 September 2023 Friendly	Ispartaspor (Turkey)	0–3	(Egypt) Pyramids	Burdur, Turkey
			El Karti; Lakay; El Said

18 March 2024 Friendly	Pyramids (Egypt)	9–1	(Egypt) Othmanthon	Cairo
22:00 UTC+3		Report		Stadium: 30 June Stadium

== Competitions ==
=== Overall record ===
Competition	First match	Last match	Starting round	Final position	Record							
Competition	First match	Last match	Starting round	Final position	Pld	W	D	L	GF	GA	GD	Win %
Egyptian Premier League	21 September 2023	14 August 2024	Matchday 1	2nd	34	24	7	3	62	27	+35	70.59
Egypt Cup	15 July 2024	30 August 2024	Round of 32	Winners	5	4	1	0	11	1	+10	80.00
Egyptian League Cup	10 January 2024	1 February 2024	Group stage	Quarter-finals	4	1	2	1	8	8	+0	25.00
Egyptian Super Cup	25 December 2023	28 December 2023	Semi-finals	Third-place	2	0	2	0	1	1	+0	0.00
CAF Champions League	17 September 2023	2 March 2024	Second round	Group stage	8	2	3	3	9	9	+0	25.00
Total					53	31	15	7	91	46	+45	58.49

Source: Soccerway

=== Egyptian Premier League ===
==== League table ====
Pos	Team	Pld	W	D	L	GF	GA	GD	Pts	Qualification or relegation
1	Al Ahly (C)	34	27	4	3	75	28	+47	85	Qualification for the Champions League second round (Note: Al Ahly qualified for the Champions League second round by winning the 2023–24 CAF Champions League.)
2	Pyramids	34	24	7	3	62	27	+35	79	Qualification for the Champions League first round
3	Zamalek	34	17	8	9	53	37	+16	56 (Note: Zamalek were deducted three points for refusing to play their away fixture against Al Ahly, scheduled to be played on 25 June 2024.)	Qualification for the Confederation Cup second round (Note: Zamalek qualified for the Confederation Cup second round by winning the 2023–24 CAF Confederation Cup.)
4	Al Masry	34	16	7	11	41	39	+2	55	Qualification for the Confederation Cup second round (Note: The league was not finished by the CAF deadline for associations to submit teams participating in next season's CAF competitions. As a result, Al Masry, who finished the first half of the season at third place (and were also at third place by the time of the draw) qualified for the CAF Confederation Cup.)
5	Modern Future	34	14	12	8	40	28	+12	54 (Note: Head-to-head points: Modern Future 4, Smouha 1.)	

Source: Soccerway
Rules for classification: 1) Points; 2) Head-to-head points; 3) Head-to-head goal difference; 4) Goal difference; 5) Goals scored; 6) Play-off tie.
(Note: Head-to-head records are used for final standings only)
(C) Champions

==== Results summary ====
Overall								Home						Away					
Pld	W	D	L	GF	GA	GD	Pts	W	D	L	GF	GA	GD	W	D	L	GF	GA	GD
34	24	7	3	62	27	+35	79	12	4	1	29	15	+14	12	3	2	33	12	+21

Source: Worldfootball

==== Results by round ====
Round	1
Ground	H
Result	D
Position	8

Source: Worldfootball
A = Away; H = Home; W = Win; D = Draw; L = Loss

==== Matches ====
The league fixtures were unveiled on 11 September 2023.

21 September 2023 1	Pyramids	2–2	Zamalek	Cairo
19:00 UTC+3	El Said 24'; El Karti (yellow card) 33'; Gabr (yellow card) 65'; Sobhi 77'	Report	Roqa (yellow card) 21'; Mathlouthi (yellow card) 53'; Dunga 56'; Ndiaye 62'; Alaa (yellow card) 76'; Sobhy (yellow card) 87'	Stadium: 30 June Stadium; Referee: Mahmoud Bassiouny

25 September 2023 2	National Bank	0–1	Pyramids	Cairo
16:00 UTC+3		Report	Sobhi (yellow card) 18'; Ashraf 69' (o.g.); Hamdy (yellow card) 85'	Stadium: Al Salam Stadium; Referee: Ahmed Al Ghandour

8 October 2023 3	Pyramids	1–0	ENPPI	Cairo
19:00	Mayele 13'			Stadium: 30 June Stadium; Referee: Mahmoud Nagi

22 October 2023 4	Modern Future	0–1	Pyramids	Cairo
19:00			Abdel Salam 57' (o.g.)	Stadium: Cairo International Stadium; Referee: Abdelaziz El Sayed

27 October 2023 5	Pyramids	3–2	Al Masry	Alexandria
17:00	Mayele 45+2', 85'; Fathi 48'		El Shamy 82'; Guenaoui 88'	Stadium: Borg El Arab Stadium; Referee: Mahmoud Bassiouni

3 November 2023 6	Ceramica Cleopatra	2–0	Pyramids	Cairo
		Report		Stadium: Osman Ahmed Osman Stadium

28 November 2023 7	Pyramids	2–1	Ismaily	Cairo
16:00 UTC+2	Chibi (yellow card) 14'; El Said 66' (pen.); Sobhi (yellow card) 67'; Lakay 86'; El Gabbas (yellow card) 87'; Touré (red card) 90'		Annor 12'; Hashem (yellow card) 34' (yellow-red card) 41'; Bayoumi (yellow card) 45'; Abdelsamia (yellow card) 64'; El Saeey (yellow card) 87'	Stadium: 30 June Stadium; Referee: Mohammed Yousef

14 December 2023 9	Pyramids	2–2	Baladiyat El Mahalla	Cairo
19:00 UTC+2	Mayele 22'; El Said (penalty missed) 43'; Lakay 46'		Ashraf 32'; Reda 75'	Stadium: 30 June Stadium; Referee: Sobhy El Amrawi

14 February 2024 12	ZED	0–0	Pyramids	Cairo
19:00 UTC+2				Stadium: Cairo International Stadium; Referee: Tarek Magdy

18 February 2024 13	Pyramids	1–0	Al Ittihad	Cairo
19:00 UTC+2	Samy 76'			Stadium: 30 June Stadium; Referee: Mahmoud El Banna

6 March 2024 15	Pyramids	1–1	Pharco	Cairo
19:00 UTC+2	Adel 53'		Gamal 30' (pen.)	Stadium: 30 June Stadium; Referee: Mohamed Maarouf

10 March 2024 16	El Dakhleya	0–2	Pyramids	Cairo
16:00 UTC+2		Report	Adel 45'; Chibi 84'	Stadium: Al Salam Stadium; Referee: Hesham El Kady

5 April 2024 17	Pyramids	0–0	Tala'ea El Gaish	Cairo
22:00 UTC+2		Report		Stadium: 30 June Stadium; Referee: Ibrahim Nour El Din

9 April 2024 8	El Gouna	0–4	Pyramids	El Gouna
22:00 UTC+2		Report		Stadium: Khaled Bichara Stadium; Referee: Walid Abdelrazek
Note: Postponed from 6 December.

15 April 2024 10	Al Mokawloon Al Arab	0–2	Pyramids	Cairo
16:00 UTC+2		Report	El Karti 8'; Mayele 73'	Stadium: Osman Ahmed Osman Stadium; Referee: Mohamed Al Ghazi
Note: Postponed due to Pyramids' participation in the Egyptian Super Cup.

24 April 2024 19	Pyramids	3–2	National Bank	Cairo
19:00 UTC+2		Report		Stadium: 30 June Stadium

1 May 2024 20	ENPPI	0–1	Pyramids	Cairo
				Stadium: Petrosport Stadium

6 May 2024 21	Pyramids	2–1	Modern Future	Cairo
19:00	Mayele 76'; Hafez 90+2' (pen.)	Report	Farouk 20'	Stadium: 30 June Stadium; Referee: Nader Qamar Al-Dawla

11 May 2024 22	Al Masry	0–1	Pyramids	Alexandria
19:00		Report	Sobhi 87'	Stadium: Borg El Arab Stadium; Referee: Amin Omar

15 May 2024 23	Pyramids	2–1	Ceramica Cleopatra	Cairo
19:00	Mayele 31', 45+4'	Report	Adel 45+6'	Stadium: 30 June Stadium; Referee: Mahmoud Wafa

19 May 2024 24	Ismaily	0–2	Pyramids	Ismailia
18:00		Report	Fathi 51'; Sobhi 74' (pen.)	Stadium: Ismailia Stadium; Referee: Tarek Magdy

27 May 2024 25	Pyramids	1–0	El Gouna	Cairo
16:00	Adel 27'	Report		Stadium: 30 June Stadium; Referee: Mohamed Salama

13 June 2024 11	Pyramids	3–0	Smouha	Cairo
19:00 UTC+3	Lakay 18'; Fathi 24'; Mayele 68'		Greisha (penalty missed) 45+7'	Stadium: 30 June Stadium; Referee: Mohamed El Atabani
Note: Postponed from 2 January.

23 June 2024 27	Pyramids	3–1	Al Mokawloon Al Arab	Cairo
19:00 UTC+3	Mayele 59', 68'; Adel 63'		Ochaya 19'	Stadium: 30 June Stadium; Referee: Mohamed El Hanafi

28 June 2024 28	Smouha	2–3	Pyramids	Alexandria
20:00 UTC+3	Soliman (red card) 45+8'; Hassan 15' (pen.); Farid 90+1'		Mayele 45+2'; Marei 72'; Lakay 79'	Stadium: Borg El Arab Stadium; Referee: Mohammed Salamah
Note: The match was suspended on June 28 due to a fire in one of the lighting poles and stands at Smouha's home, Alexandria Stadium, in the 49th minute, with the score at 1–1. The match was resumed at Borg El Arab Stadium, Alexandria.

8 July 2024 30	Al Ittihad	0–4	Pyramids	Alexandria
17:30 UTC+3			Lakay 28'; Hamdy 48'; Mayele 58'; Zalaka 69'	Stadium: Alexandria Stadium; Referee: Mahmoud El Banna

12 July 2024 14	Al Ahly	3–2	Pyramids	Cairo
21:00 UTC+3	Abou Ali 17', 63' (pen.); El Shahat (yellow card) 34'; Afsha 86'	Report	Mayele 25'; Samy 51'; Tawfik (yellow card) 78'; Bobo (yellow card) 90'	Stadium: Cairo International Stadium; Attendance: 30,000; Referee: Javier Alberola Rojas (Spain)
Note: Postponed from 27 February.

22 July 2024 31	Pyramids	0–1	Al Ahly	Cairo
21:00 UTC+3	Marei (yellow card) 32'; Tawfik (yellow card) 42'; Mayele (yellow card) 45+1'; El Karti (yellow card) 66'; Chibi (red card) 80'	Report	Abou Ali 28'; Abdelmonem (yellow card) 15'; Emam (yellow card) 45+4'; Abdelfattah (yellow card) 50' (yellow-red card) 89'; Attia (yellow card) 90+3'	Stadium: 30 June Stadium; Attendance: 30,000; Referee: Felix Zwayer (Germany)

26 July 2024 18	Zamalek	1–1	Pyramids	Cairo
21:00 UTC+3				Stadium: Cairo International Stadium
Note: Postponed from 19 April.

30 July 2024 32	Pharco	2–2	Pyramids	Alexandria
21:00				Stadium: Alexandria Stadium

4 August 2024 29	Pyramids	2–1	ZED	Cairo
				Stadium: 30 June Stadium

11 August 2024 34	Tala'ea El Gaish	2–5	Pyramids	Cairo
21:00				Stadium: Gehaz El Reyada Stadium; Referee: Mohamed El Ghazi

14 August 2024 33	Pyramids	1–0	El Dakhleya	Cairo
21:00				Stadium: 30 June Stadium

=== 2022–23 Egypt Cup ===
8 November 2023 Semi-finals	Zamalek	3–3 (a.e.t.) (4–3 p)	Pyramids	Cairo
19:00	Emad 90+2'; Akinyoola 101'; Mansi 112'	Report	Mayele 5'; Fathi 92'; Hamdy 108'	Stadium: Cairo International Stadium; Referee: Ahmad Al-Ghandour
	Penalties
	Mathlouthi (penalty scored); Ashraf (penalty missed); Gomaa (penalty scored); Mansi (penalty scored); Zizo (penalty scored)		(penalty scored) El Said; (penalty scored) Sobhi; (penalty scored) Hafez; (penalty missed) Samy; (penalty missed) Fathi

=== 2023–24 Egypt Cup ===
15 July 2024 Round of 32	Pyramids	4–0	Al Nasr	Cairo
20:00 UTC+3	Osama 10'; Hamdy 22', 37', 51'			Stadium: 30 June Stadium

8 August 2024 Round of 16	Pyramids	1–0	Abou Qir Fertilizers	Cairo
21:00 UTC+3	Hamdy 28'		Ibrahim (red card) 80'	Stadium: 30 June Stadium

21 August 2024 Quarter-finals	Pyramids	4–0	El Gouna	Cairo
21:00 UTC+3				Stadium: 30 June Stadium

27 August 2024 Semi-finals	Al Masry	1–1 (a.e.t.) (3–4 p)	Pyramids	Alexandria
21:00 UTC+3	Mohsen 83'; Ben Youssef (red card) 120+2'		Lakay 10'; Marei (red card) 58'	Stadium: Borg El Arab Stadium

30 August 2024 Final	Pyramids	1–0	ZED	Alexandria
21:00 UTC+3	Mayele 87'			Stadium: Borg El Arab Stadium

=== League Cup ===
==== Group stage ====
10 January 2024 1	Pyramids	2–2	Pharco	Cairo
17:00	Tawfik 64'; Lakay 86'	Report	Gamal 33' (pen.); Teiri 52'	Stadium: 30 June Stadium; Referee: Walid Abdel Razek

16 January 2024 2	Tala'ea El Gaish	2–2	Pyramids	Cairo
17:00	Joules 34'; Wahid 85'	Report	Tolulope 45+3'; A. Tarek 68' (o.g.)	Stadium: Gehaz El Reyada Stadium; Referee: Mahmoud Nagy

26 January 2024 3	Pyramids	3–1	ZED	Cairo
19:00	Lakay 34' (pen.); Reda 37'; Ma. Hamdy 63'	Report	Hussein 69'	Stadium: 30 June Stadium; Referee: Abdel Aziz El Sayed

==== Knockout stage ====
1 February 2024 Quarter-finals	Al Masry	3–1	Pyramids	Alexandria
19:30	Gaber 27'; Mohsen 75'; El Eraki 85'	Report	Gad 90+2' (o.g.)	Stadium: Borg El Arab Stadium; Referee: Nader Kamar El Dawla

=== Egyptian Super Cup ===
25 December 2023 Semi-finals	Pyramids	0–0 (13–14 p)	Modern Future	Abu Dhabi, United Arab Emirates
17:00		Report		Stadium: Mohammed bin Zayed Stadium; Referee: Amin Omar
	Penalties
	El Said (penalty scored); Sobhi (penalty scored); Hafez (penalty scored); Lakay (penalty missed); El Gabbas (penalty scored); Galal (penalty missed); M. Reda (penalty scored); Chibi (penalty scored); Samy (penalty scored); Lasheen (penalty missed); Mayhoub (penalty scored); El Said (penalty scored); Sobhi (penalty scored); Hafez (penalty scored); M. Reda (penalty scored); El Gabbas (penalty scored); Galal (penalty missed)		(penalty scored) B. Ali; (penalty scored) El Ouadi; (penalty missed) H. Adel; (penalty scored) Atef; (penalty scored) M. Mahmoud; (penalty missed) G. Mohamed; (penalty scored) M. Rabia; (penalty scored) Ngwem; (penalty scored) El Fil; (penalty missed) Bello; (penalty scored) Genish; (penalty scored) B. Ali; (penalty scored) El Ouadi; (penalty scored) Atef; (penalty scored) M. Mahmoud; (penalty scored) Ngwem; (penalty scored) M. Rabia

28 December 2023 Third	Ceramica Cleopatra	1–1 (4–5 p)	Pyramids	Abu Dhabi, United Arab Emirates
17:00	Kendouci 70'	Report	M. Fathi 78'	Stadium: Mohammed bin Zayed Stadium; Referee: Mahmoud El Banna
	Penalties
	Rayyan (penalty scored); Ramadan (penalty scored); Shokry (penalty scored); Bolbol (penalty scored); Tony (penalty missed)		El Said (penalty scored); Sobhi (penalty scored); Hafez (penalty scored); El Karti (penalty scored); Lakay (penalty scored)

=== CAF Champions League ===
==== Second round ====
The draw for the qualifying rounds was held on 25 July 2023.

17 September 2022 First leg	APR (Rwanda)	0–0	(Egypt) Pyramids	Kigali, Rwanda
15:00 UTC+2				Stadium: Kigali Pelé Stadium; Referee: Jean Ouattara (Burkina Faso)

29 September 2023 Second leg	Pyramids (Egypt)	6–1 (6–1 agg.)	(Rwanda) APR	Cairo
18:00 UTC+3	Fathi 18', 56', 61', 82'; El Karti 21'; Chibi 69'	Report	Mbaoma 86' (pen.)	Stadium: 30 June Stadium; Referee: Abdel Aziz Mohamed Bouh (Mauritania)

==== Group stage ====
The draw for the group stage was held on 6 October 2023.

Pos	Team	Pld	W	D	L	GF	GA	GD	Pts	Qualification	SUN	TPM	NDB	PYR
1	(South Africa) Mamelodi Sundowns	6	4	1	1	7	1	+6	13	Advance to knockout stage	—	1–0	3–0	0–0
2	(Democratic Republic of the Congo) TP Mazembe	6	3	1	2	6	2	+4	10	Advance to knockout stage	1–0	—	2–0	3–0
3	(Mauritania) FC Nouadhibou	6	1	2	3	4	9	−5	5 (Note: Ranked on head-to-head points: FC Nouadhibou 4, Pyramids 1.)		0–2	0–0	—	2–0
4	(Egypt) Pyramids	6	1	2	3	3	8	−5	5		0–1	1–0	2–2	—

Source: CAF
Rules for classification: Group stage tiebreakers
Notes:

24 November 2023 1	Pyramids (Egypt)	1–0	(Democratic Republic of the Congo) TP Mazembe	Cairo
18:00 UTC+2	Lakay 54'	Report		Stadium: 30 June Stadium; Referee: Peter Waweru (Kenya)

2 December 2023 2	FC Nouadhibou (Mauritania)	2–0	(Egypt) Pyramids	Nouakchott, Mauritania
16:00 UTC+0	Amar 4'; Oubeid 90+4'	Report		Stadium: Stade Cheikha Ould Boïdiya; Referee: Bamlak Tessema Weyesa (Ethiopia)

10 December 2023 3	Mamelodi Sundowns (South Africa)	0–0	(Egypt) Pyramids	Pretoria, South Africa
15:00 UTC+2		Report		Stadium: Loftus Versfeld Stadium; Referee: Pierre Atcho (Gabon)

19 December 2023 4	Pyramids (Egypt)	0–1	(South Africa) Mamelodi Sundowns	Cairo
18:00 UTC+2		Report	Mokoena 17'	Stadium: 30 June Stadium; Referee: Alhadi Allaou Mahamat (Chad)

24 February 2024 5	TP Mazembe (Democratic Republic of the Congo)	3–0	(Egypt) Pyramids	Lubumbashi, DR Congo
15:00 UTC+2	Beya 32'; Likonza 45+1'; Mwamba 90+2'	Report		Stadium: Stade TP Mazembe; Referee: Daniel Nii Laryea (Ghana)

2 March 2024 6	Pyramids (Egypt)	2–2	(Mauritania) FC Nouadhibou	Cairo
15:00 UTC+2	Mayele 73', 90+1'	Report	Bessam 64'; M'bareck 82'	Stadium: 30 June Stadium; Referee: Jelly Alfred Chavani (South Africa)

== Statistics ==
=== Appearances and goals ===
No.	Pos	Nat	Player	Total		Premier League		Cup		League Cup		Champions League	
No.	Pos	Nat	Player	Apps	Goals	Apps	Goals	Apps	Goals	Apps	Goals	Apps	Goals
Goalkeepers
1	GK	(Egypt) EGY	Ahmed El Shenawy	3	0	2	0	0	0	0	0	1	0
22	GK	(Egypt) EGY	Sherif Ekramy	0	0	0	0	0	0	0	0	0	0
	GK	(Egypt) EGY	Ahmed Mayhoub	0	0	0	0	0	0	0	0	0	0
Defenders
3	DF	(Egypt) EGY	Mahmoud Marei	1	0	1	0	0	0	0	0	0	0
4	DF	(Egypt) EGY	Ahmed Samy	3	0	2	0	0	0	0	0	1	0
5	DF	(Egypt) EGY	Ali Gabr	3	0	2	0	0	0	0	0	1	0
15	DF	(Morocco) MAR	Mohamed Chibi	2	0	1	0	0	0	0	0	1	0
21	DF	(Egypt) EGY	Mohamed Hamdy	2	0	1+1	0	0	0	0	0	0	0
24	DF	(Egypt) EGY	Ahmed Fathy	1	0	1	0	0	0	0	0	0	0
29	DF	(Egypt) EGY	Karim Hafez	3	0	1+1	0	0	0	0	0	1	0
Midfielders
7	MF	(Burkina Faso) BFA	Blati Touré	3	0	1+1	0	0	0	0	0	0+1	0
10	MF	(Egypt) EGY	Ramadan Sobhi	2	1	1+1	1	0	0	0	0	0	0
11	MF	(Egypt) EGY	Mostafa Fathi	3	0	1+1	0	0	0	0	0	1	0
14	MF	(Egypt) EGY	Mohanad Lasheen	3	0	2	0	0	0	0	0	1	0
18	MF	(Morocco) MAR	Walid El Karti	3	0	2	0	0	0	0	0	1	0
19	MF	(Egypt) EGY	Abdallah El Said	2	1	1+1	1	0	0	0	0	0	0
20	MF	(Egypt) EGY	Seif Farouk Gaafar	1	0	0	0	0	0	0	0	0+1	0
25	MF	(Egypt) EGY	Youssef Osama	0	0	0	0	0	0	0	0	0	0
30	MF	(Egypt) EGY	Ibrahim Adel	3	0	2	0	0	0	0	0	1	0
	MF	(Egypt) EGY	Ahmed Tawfik	1	0	0	0	0	0	0	0	1	0
Forwards
9	FW	(Democratic Republic of the Congo) COD	Fiston Mayele	3	0	1+1	0	0	0	0	0	1	0
23	FW	(South Africa) RSA	Fagrie Lakay	3	0	1+1	0	0	0	0	0	0+1	0
26	FW	(Egypt) EGY	Mohamed El Gabbas	1	0	0	0	0	0	0	0	0+1	0

Last updated: 25 September 2023
Source: Competitions
