= 2023–24 Al Ahly SC season =

Al Ahly SC
2023–24 season
- President: Mahmoud El Khatib
- Head coach: Marcel Koller
- Stadium: Cairo International Stadium
- Egyptian Premier League: Champions
- 2022–23 Egypt Cup: Winners
- 2023–24 Egypt Cup: Withdrew
- Egyptian Super Cup: Winners
- CAF Champions League: Winners
- Africa Football League: Semi-finals
- CAF Super Cup: Runners-up
- FIFA Club World Cup: Third place
- Top goalscorer: League: Wessam Abou Ali (18); All: Wessam Abou Ali (19)
- Biggest win: Al Ahly 5–1 Baladiyat El Mahalla
- Biggest defeat: Fluminense 2–0 Al Ahly
Home colours	Away colours	Third colours
- All statistics correct as of 20 August 2024.

The 2023–24 Al Ahly SC season was the 117th edition and the 65th consecutive season in the topflight of Egyptian football. In addition to the domestic league, Al Ahly participated in this season's editions of the Egypt Cup, the League Cup, the CAF Champions League, the Africa Football League, the CAF Super Cup and the FIFA Club World Cup. Al Ahly decided to withdraw from the league cup due to fixture congestion.

== Kit information ==
Supplier: Adidas
Sponsors: Etisalat by e&, FABMISR Bank, GLC Paints, Al Marasem Development, Shell Helix, Lipton Tea, Prometeon, Coca-Cola

Home	Home alt	Away	Away alt.	Third	Third alt.

== Players ==
=== First-team squad ===
Note: Flags indicate national team as defined under FIFA eligibility rules; some limited exceptions apply. Players may hold more than one non-FIFA nationality.

No.	Pos.	Nation	Player
1	GK	EGY	Mohamed El Shenawy (captain)
2	DF	EGY	Khaled Abdel Fattah
3	DF	EGY	Omar Kamal
4	DF	EGY	Mahmoud Metwalli
5	DF	EGY	Ramy Rabia (2nd captain)
6	DF	EGY	Yasser Ibrahim
7	MF	EGY	Kahraba
8	MF	EGY	Akram Tawfik
9	MF	PLE	Wessam Abou Ali
10	FW	RSA	Percy Tau
11	MF	EGY	Ahmed Abdel Kader
12	FW	MAR	Reda Slim
13	MF	EGY	Marwan Attia
14	MF	EGY	Hussein El Shahat
15	MF	MLI	Aliou Dieng
16	GK	EGY	Hamza Alaa
17	MF	EGY	Amr El Solia (4th captain)

No.	Pos.	Nation	Player
18	FW	TUN	Mohamed Dhaoui
19	MF	EGY	Afsha
20	MF	EGY	Karim Walid
21	DF	TUN	Ali Maâloul
22	MF	EGY	Emam Ashour
25	GK	EGY	Mahmoud El Zanfaly
26	MF	EGY	Mostafa Abou El Khier
27	FW	FRA	Anthony Modeste
28	DF	EGY	Karim Fouad
29	FW	EGY	Taher Mohamed
30	DF	EGY	Mohamed Hany (3rd captain)
31	GK	EGY	Mostafa Shobeir
33	DF	EGY	Karim El Debes
34	DF	EGY	Moataz Mohamed
36	MF	EGY	Ahmed Nabil Koka
37	GK	EGY	Mostafa Makhlouf
38	FW	EGY	Mohamed Abdallah
41	DF	EGY	Ahmed Abdin

=== Out on loan ===
Note: Flags indicate national team as defined under FIFA eligibility rules; some limited exceptions apply. Players may hold more than one non-FIFA nationality.

No.	Pos.	Nation	Player
—	DF	EGY	Mohamed El Maghrabi (at Smouha)
—	DF	EGY	Mohamed Ashraf (at ZED)
—	DF	EGY	Abdallah Bostangy (at Smouha)
—	DF	EGY	Abdelrahman Rashdan (at Modern Sport)
—	MF	ALG	Ahmed Kendouci (at Ceramica Cleopatra)
—	MF	EGY	Ammar Hamdy (at Al Mokawloon Al Arab)
—	MF	EGY	Raafat Khalil (at ZED)

No.	Pos.	Nation	Player
—	MF	EGY	Messi (at ElDakhleya)
—	MF	EGY	Kabaka (at Modern Sport)
—	FW	EGY	Mostafa El Badry (at Smouha)
—	FW	EGY	Mohamed Yasser (at Teplice)
—	FW	GHA	Samuel Oppong (at WE SC)
—	FW	EGY	Mohamed Zaalouk (at Modern Sport)
—	FW	GER	Amr Khaled (at Aarau)

== Transfers ==
=== In ===
Pos.	Player	Transferred from	Fee	Date	Source
MF	(Egypt) Emam Ashour	(Denmark) Midtjylland	€2,600,000	18 July 2023	
MF	(Egypt) Mostafa El Badry	(Egypt) Future	Loan return	20 July 2023	
MF	(Egypt) Karim Nedved	(Egypt) Future	Loan return	20 July 2023	
DF	(Egypt) Saad Samir	(Egypt) Future	Loan return	20 July 2023	
FW	(Morocco) Reda Slim	(Morocco) AS FAR	€2,000,000	30 July 2023	
FW	(France) Anthony Modeste	(Germany) Borussia Dortmund	Free	11 September 2023	
FW	(Palestine) Wessam Abou Ali	(Sweden) Sirius	€2,000,000	11 January 2024	
DF	(Egypt) Omar Kamal	(Egypt) Modern Future	Swap deal	12 January 2024	
DF	(Ghana) Reindorf Huncho	(Ghana) Cheetah	€100,000	3 February 2024	
FW	(Ghana) Samuel Oppong	(Ghana) MSK Zilina	€100,000	3 February 2024	

=== Out ===
Pos.	Player	Transferred to	Fee	Date	Source
MF	(Brazil) Bruno Sávio	(Bolivia) Club Bolívar	Undisclosed	5 July 2023	
DF	(Egypt) Ayman Ashraf	(Egypt) National Bank	Free	18 July 2023	
FW	(Egypt) Hossam Hassan	(Egypt) Smouha	€297,000	21 July 2023	
FW	(Egypt) Mostafa Fawzy	(Egypt) ZED	Undisclosed	27 July 2023	
MF	(Egypt) Mostafa Saad	(Egypt) ZED	Undisclosed	27 July 2023	
FW	(Egypt) Shady Hussein	(Egypt) ZED	€384,000	27 July 2023	
GK	(Egypt) Ali Lotfi	(Egypt) ZED	Undisclosed	28 July 2023	
DF	(Egypt) Mohamed Ashraf	(Egypt) ZED	Loan	28 July 2023	
FW	(Egypt) Mohamed Sherif	(Saudi Arabia) Al-Khaleej	Undisclosed	14 August 2023	
MF	(Egypt) Mohamed Mahmoud	(Egypt) Future	Undisclosed	18 August 2023	
MF	(Algeria) Ahmed Kendouci	(Egypt) Ceramica Cleopatra	Loan	27 August 2023	
FW	(Democratic Republic of the Congo) Walter Bwalya	(Morocco) Wydad AC	Free	29 August 2023	
MF	(Egypt) Ammar Hamdy	(Egypt) Al Mokawloon Al Arab	€90,000	4 September 2023	
FW	(Egypt) Fahd Gomaa	(Egypt) Petrol Asyout	Free	5 September 2023	
MF	(Egypt) Raafat Khalil	(Egypt) ZED FC	Loan	14 September 2023	
MF	(Egypt) Zeyad Tarek	(Egypt) ENPPI	Free	14 September 2023	
MF	(Egypt) Mohamed Fakhri	(Egypt) Pharco	€121,000	14 September 2023	
DF	(Egypt) Abdelrahman Rashdan	(Egypt) Modern Future	Loan	12 January 2024	
MF	(Egypt) Kabaka	(Egypt) Modern Future	Loan	12 January 2024	
FW	(Egypt) Mohamed Zaalouk	(Egypt) Modern Future	Loan	12 January 2024	
FW	(France) Anthony Modeste		End of contract	1 July 2024	

== Pre-season and friendlies ==
Win Draw Loss

The team had a training camp in Austria, which took place from 28 August to 6 September. During this period, they participated in one practice match.

30 August 2023 Friendly	Mauerwerk (Austria)	v	(Egypt) Al Ahly	Bad Erlach, Austria
18:00 UTC+2				Stadium: Sportanlage SV Bad Erlach
Note: The match was cancelled.

5 September 2023 Friendly	Aluminij (Slovenia)	1–3	(Egypt) Al Ahly	Austria
18:00 UTC+2	1'		Kahraba (penalty missed) 37' ' 41'; Zaalouk; Mohsen

11 September 2023 Friendly	Tala'ea El Gaish (Egypt)	0–1	(Egypt) Al Ahly	Cairo
	Penalty missed		Attia 4'; Slim (penalty missed)	Stadium: Gehaz El Reyada Stadium; Attendance: 0

23 January 2024 Friendly	Al-Okhdood (Saudi Arabia)	2–1	(Egypt) Al Ahly	United Arab Emirates
	22'; 51'		Cristo 64'; Rami Rabia (penalty missed)	Attendance: 0

26 January 2024 Friendly	Hatta (United Arab Emirates)	1–1	(Egypt) Al Ahly	United Arab Emirates
	Jamal Marouf 50'		Modeste 70', (penalty missed)	Attendance: 0

5 February 2024 Friendly	Al Ahly (Egypt)	2–1	(Egypt) Smouha	Cairo
15:00 UTC+2	Modeste 29'		Hassan 17'	Stadium: Al Salam Stadium

8 June 2024 Friendly	Al Ahly (Egypt)	1–0	(Egypt) Nogoom	Cairo
	Kahraba 14'			Stadium: Mokhtar El Tetsh Stadium

== Competitions ==
=== Overall record ===
Competition	First match	Last match	Starting round	Final position	Record							
Competition	First match	Last match	Starting round	Final position	Pld	W	D	L	GF	GA	GD	Win %
Egyptian Premier League	19 September 2023	17 August 2024	Matchday 1	Winners	34	27	4	3	75	28	+47	79.41
2022–23 Egypt Cup	4 October 2023	8 March 2024	Semi-finals	Winner	2	2	0	0	5	0	+5	100.00
2023–24 Egypt Cup	20 July 2024		Round of 32	Withdrew	1	1	0	0	1	0	+1	100.00
Egyptian Super Cup	25 December 2023	28 December 2023	Semi-finals	Winner	2	2	0	0	5	2	+3	100.00
CAF Champions League	24 September 2023	25 May 2024	Second round	Winners	14	9	5	0	20	1	+19	64.29
Africa Football League	20 October 2023	1 November 2023	Quarter-finals	Quarter-finals	4	0	3	1	3	4	−1	0.00
CAF Super Cup	15 September 2023		Match	Runner-up	1	0	0	1	0	1	−1	0.00
FIFA Club World Cup	15 December 2023	22 December 2023	Second round	Third Place	3	2	0	1	7	5	+2	66.67
Total					61	43	12	6	116	41	+75	70.49

Source: Soccerway

=== Egyptian Premier League ===
==== League table ====
Pos	Team	Pld	W	D	L	GF	GA	GD	Pts	Qualification or relegation
1	Al Ahly (C)	34	27	4	3	75	28	+47	85	Qualification for the Champions League second round (Note: Al Ahly qualified for the Champions League second round by winning the 2023–24 CAF Champions League.)
2	Pyramids	34	24	7	3	62	27	+35	79	Qualification for the Champions League first round
3	Zamalek	34	17	8	9	53	37	+16	56 (Note: Zamalek were deducted three points for refusing to play their away fixture against Al Ahly, scheduled to be played on 25 June 2024.)	Qualification for the Confederation Cup second round (Note: Zamalek qualified for the Confederation Cup second round by winning the 2023–24 CAF Confederation Cup.)
4	Al Masry	34	16	7	11	41	39	+2	55	Qualification for the Confederation Cup second round (Note: The league was not finished by the CAF deadline for associations to submit teams participating in next season's CAF competitions. As a result, Al Masry, who finished the first half of the season at third place (and were also at third place by the time of the draw) qualified for the CAF Confederation Cup.)
5	Modern Future	34	14	12	8	40	28	+12	54 (Note: Head-to-head points: Modern Future 4, Smouha 1.)	

Source: Soccerway
Rules for classification: 1) Points; 2) Head-to-head points; 3) Head-to-head goal difference; 4) Goal difference; 5) Goals scored; 6) Play-off tie.
(Note: Head-to-head records are used for final standings only)
(C) Champions

==== Results summary ====
Overall								Home						Away					
Pld	W	D	L	GF	GA	GD	Pts	W	D	L	GF	GA	GD	W	D	L	GF	GA	GD
34	27	4	3	75	28	+47	85	14	2	1	44	13	+31	13	2	2	31	15	+16

Source: Worldfootball

==== Results by round ====
Round	1
Ground	H
Result	W
Position	1

Source: Worldfootball
A = Away; H = Home; W = Win; D = Draw; L = Loss; P = Postponed

==== Matches ====
The league fixtures were unveiled on 11 September 2023.

19 September 2023 1	Al Ahly	4–0	Al Masry	Alexandria
19:00 UTC+3	Slim 44'; Dieng (yellow card) 65'; Tau 69', 74'; Fouad 88'	Report	Bah (yellow card) 11'; El Sayed (yellow card) 25'; El Mohamady (yellow card) 32' (yellow-red card) 52'	Stadium: Borg El Arab Stadium; Referee: Mohamed Adel

8 October 2023 3	Al Ahly	3–1	Ismaily	Alexandria
19:00 UTC+3	Tau 23', 65'; El Shahat 38'; Mohamed (yellow card) 45'	Report	Annor 90'; Magdy (yellow card) 90+1'	Stadium: Borg El Arab Stadium; Referee: Mahmoud El Banna

4 November 2023 6	Al Mokawloon Al Arab	1–2	Al Ahly	Cairo
19:00 UTC+2	Ochaya 89' (pen.)	Report	Mohamed 45+4'; Hany 84'	Stadium: Osman Ahmed Osman Stadium; Referee: Ibrahim Nour El Din

8 November 2023 2	Ceramica Cleopatra	1–2	Al Ahly	Cairo
16:00 UTC+2	Kendouci 58'	Report	Ibrahim 33'; Afsha 90+1'	Stadium: Osman Ahmed Osman Stadium; Referee: Abdelaziz El Sayed
Note: The match was originally scheduled for 27 September 2023, but was postponed due to 2023–24 CAF Champions League.

11 November 2023 4	El Gouna	1–1	Al Ahly	El Gouna
17:00 UTC+2	Belhadji 45+2' (pen.)	Report	Modeste 36'	Stadium: Khaled Bichara Stadium; Referee: Mohammed Yousef
Note: The match was originally scheduled for 23 October 2023, but was postponed.

28 November 2023 7	Al Ahly	0–0	Smouha	Cairo
19:00 UTC+2		Report		Stadium: Cairo International Stadium; Referee: Mohamed Adel

27 February 2024 5	Al Ahly	5–1	Baladiyat El Mahalla	Cairo
19:00 UTC+2	Abou Ali 5', 49' (pen.); Fouad 14'; Slim 41'; Modeste 73'		Ashraf 86' (pen.)	Stadium: Cairo International Stadium; Referee: Ahmed Ghandour
Note: The match was originally scheduled for 29 October 2023, but was postponed.

12 March 2024 15	National Bank	4–3	Al Ahly	Cairo
21:30 UTC+2	Bambo 7'; Helal 63'; Simporé 84'; Annor 90+4', (yellow card) 90+7'; El Nadry (yellow card) 90+8'		Modeste 4'; Slim 28'; El Shahat 72'	Stadium: Cairo International Stadium; Referee: Mahmoud El Banna

15 March 2024 16	Al Ahly	2–2	ENPPI	Cairo
19:00 UTC+3	Kahraba 44', 73'; Abdelmonem (yellow card) 55'; Rabia (yellow card) 90+5'		Labib 60', 90+3' (yellow card) 90+4'	Stadium: Cairo International Stadium; Referee: Tarek Magdy

11 April 2024 8	ZED	0–1	Al Ahly	Cairo
19:00 UTC+3		Report	Abou Ali 89'	Stadium: Al Salam Stadium; Referee: Amin Omar
Note: The match was originally scheduled for 6 December 2023, but was postponed.

15 April 2024 10	Zamalek	2–1	Al Ahly	Cairo
19:00 UTC+2	Jaziri 44', 86'	Report	Nedved (yellow card) 21'; Abdelmonem (yellow card) 41'; Abdelkader 73'	Stadium: Cairo International Stadium; Referee: Ibrahim Nour El Din
Note: Postponed from 15 February.

1 May 2024 20	Ismaily	1–2	Al Ahly	Alexandria
19:00 UTC+3	Magdy 90' (pen.)		Tau 33'; Emam 57'	Stadium: Borg El Arab Stadium; Referee: Ahmed El Ghandour

4 May 2024 21	Al Ahly	3–0	El Gouna	Cairo
19:00 UTC+3	Ashour 37'; Metwali 62'; Kahraba 80' (pen.)			Stadium: Cairo International Stadium; Referee: Mahmoud Bassiouni

7 May 2024 9	Al Ahly	4–1	Al Ittihad	Cairo
19:00 UTC+3	Ali 28' (pen.); Slim 32'; Omar 42'; Kahraba 65' (pen.); Slim (yellow card) 76'; Abdelmonem (yellow card) 84'		Boateng 58', (yellow card) 90+4'; Mabululu (red card) 88'	Stadium: Cairo International Stadium

11 May 2024 22	Baladiyat El Mahalla	1–2	Al Ahly	Cairo
19:00	Hany 57'		Kamal 79'; Modeste 90+8'	Stadium: El Mahalla Stadium; Referee: Mahmoud Nassif

14 June 2024 11	Pharco	1–2	Al Ahly	Alexandria
	Kamal 35' (o.g.)		Ashour 30' (pen.), 45+4'
Note: Postponed from 2 January.

18 June 2024 26	Al Ittihad	0–1	Al Ahly	Alexandria
19:00			Kahraba 58'

21 June 2024 12	El Dakhleya	1–2	Al Ahly	Cairo
--:-- UTC+3	Yehia 44' (pen.)		Magdy 19'; El Solia 84'	Stadium: Al Salam Stadium

25 June 2024 27	Al Ahly	2–0; Awarded	Zamalek	Cairo
19:00		Report
Note: Awarded as a forfeit after Zamalek refused to show up.

28 June 2024 28	Al Ahly	2–1	Pharco	Cairo
19:00	El Shahat 39', 57'; Tawfik (yellow card) 69'	Report	Encada 59'; Sabry (yellow card) 60'; Fakhri (yellow card) 60'	Stadium: Cairo International Stadium; Referee: Nader Qamar Al-Dawla

1 July 2024 13	Tala'ea El Gaish	0–4	Al Ahly	Cairo
19:00 UTC+3	Diawara (yellow card) 11'; Diab (yellow card) 85'; A.Tarek (yellow card) 88'; El Said (penalty missed) 90+1'	Report	Taher 12' (yellow card) 85' (penalty missed) 86'; El Solia 34'; Abdelmonem 38'; Tawfik (yellow card) 47'; Abou Ali 90+3'	Stadium: Gehaz El Reyada Stadium; Referee: Mahmoud Bassiouni
Note: Postponed from 19 February.

4 July 2024 29	Al Ahly	4–1	El Dakhleya	Cairo
19:00	Abou Ali 35', 41' (pen.); Ashour 60', 90+2'	Report	El Henawy (yellow card) 40'; Ouka 90'	Stadium: Cairo International Stadium; Referee: Mostafa Osman

8 July 2024 30	Al Ahly	2–0	Tala'ea El Gaish	Cairo
19:00	El Solia 50'; Abou Ali 54'	Report	Samir (yellow card) 82'	Referee: Hamdah El Kallawy

12 July 2024 14	Al Ahly	3–2	Pyramids	Cairo
21:00 UTC+3	Abou Ali 17', 63' (pen.); El Shahat (yellow card) 34'; Afsha 86'	Report	Mayele 25'; Samy 51'; Tawfik (yellow card) 78'; Bobo (yellow card) 90'	Stadium: Cairo International Stadium; Attendance: 30,000; Referee: Javier Alberola Rojas (Spain)
Note: Postponed from 27 February.

16 July 2024 17	Modern Sport	1–2	Al Ahly	Cairo
	Eba 26' (yellow card) 45+1' (yellow-red card) 83'; El Fil (yellow card) 56'; El Sisi (yellow card) 60'	Report	Abdelfattah (yellow card) 12'; Ashour 45'; Tau 62'	Stadium: Cairo International Stadium; Referee: Mohamed Adel
Note: Postponed from 3 April 2024.

22 July 2024 31	Pyramids	0–1	Al Ahly	Cairo
21:00 UTC+3	Marei (yellow card) 32'; Tawfik (yellow card) 42'; Mayele (yellow card) 45+1'; El Karti (yellow card) 66'; Chibi (red card) 80'	Report	Abdelmonem (yellow card) 15'; Abou Ali 28'; Emam (yellow card) 45+4'; Abdelfattah (yellow card) 50' (yellow-red card) 89'; Attia (yellow card) 90+3'	Stadium: 30 June Stadium; Attendance: 30,000; Referee: Felix Zwayer (Germany)

26 July 2024 18	Al Masry	0–1	Al Ahly	Alexandria
21:00 UTC+3			Abou Ali 62'	Stadium: Borg El Arab Stadium; Referee: Benoît Bastien (France)
Note: Postponed from 19 April.

29 July 2024 19	Al Ahly	4–1	Ceramica Cleopatra	Cairo
21:00 UTC+3	Abou Ali 37', 90+5'; Emam 64' (pen.); Kamal 90+7'		Kendouci 50'	Stadium: Cairo International Stadium; Referee: Mohamed Maarouf
Note: Postponed from 23 April.

1 August 2024 32	Al Ahly	1–0	National Bank	Cairo
21:00 UTC+3	Abou Ali 8'			Stadium: Cairo International Stadium; Referee: Amin Omar

4 August 2024 23	Al Ahly	4–0	Al Mokawloon Al Arab	Cairo
21:00 UTC+3	Abou Ali 14', 35', 65'; Tau 77'	Report		Stadium: Cairo International Stadium; Attendance: 15,000; Referee: Mahmoud Bassiouni
Note: Postponed from 15 May.

8 August 2024 24	Smouha	0-1	Al Ahly	Alexandria
21:00 UTC+3		Report	Afsha 90+5'	Stadium: Borg El Arab Stadium; Attendance: 15,000; Referee: Wael Farhan
Note: Postponed from 19 May.

11 August 2024 25	Al Ahly	2–1	ZED	Cairo
21:00 UTC+3	Kahraba 45+3'; Abdelkader 65'		Messi 87'	Stadium: Cairo International Stadium; Attendance: 15,000
Note: Postponed from 27 May.

14 August 2024 33	ENPPI	1–1	Al Ahly	Cairo
21:00 UTC+3	Hawash 21'		Kahraba 45+1'	Stadium: Osman Ahmed Osman Stadium; Referee: Ahmed Hamdi

17 August 2024 34	Al Ahly	1–2	Modern Sport	Cairo
21:00 UTC+3	Kamal 53'		El Ouadi 83'; Eba 89'	Stadium: Cairo International Stadium; Referee: Mahmoud Nagy

=== 2022–23 Egypt Cup ===
4 October 2023 Semi-finals	Al Ahly	3–0	ENPPI	Cairo
19:00 UTC+3	Maâloul 33' (pen.); Modeste 51'; Ashour 86'	Report		Stadium: Cairo International Stadium; Referee: Tarek Magdy

8 March 2024 Final	Zamalek	0–2	Al Ahly	Riyadh
20:30 UTC+3		Report	Ashour 84'; Afsha 90+4'	Stadium: Al-Awwal Park; Referee: Anderson Daronco (Brazil)

=== 2023–24 Egypt Cup ===
19 July 2024 Round of 32	Al Ahly	1–0	Al Aluminium	Cairo
20:00	Hany 90+3'	Report		Stadium: Cairo International Stadium; Referee: Abdelrahman Saleh

20 August 2024 Round of 16	Al Ahly	0–2; Awarded	Pharco	Nasr City, Cairo
21:00				Stadium: Cairo International Stadium
Note: Awarded as a forfeit after Al Ahly refused to show up.

=== Egyptian Super Cup ===
25 December 2023 Semi-final	Al Ahly	1–0	Ceramica Cleopatra	Abu Dhabi, United Arab Emirates
21:00	Arthur 90+4' (o.g.)	Report		Stadium: Mohammed bin Zayed Stadium; Referee: Mohamed Maarouf

28 December 2023 Final	Modern Future	2–4 (a.e.t.)	Al Ahly	Abu Dhabi, United Arab Emirates
21:00	O. El Said 76'; M. Mahmoud 81'	Report	Kahraba 13'; El Shahat 34'; Modeste 114'; Fouad 116'	Stadium: Mohammed bin Zayed Stadium; Referee: Mohamed Adel

=== CAF Champions League ===
==== Second round ====
The draw for the qualifying rounds was held on 25 July 2023.

24 September 2023 First leg	Saint George (Ethiopia)	0–3	(Egypt) Al Ahly	Cairo
20:00 UTC+3		Report	El Shahat 29', 58'; Abdelkader 90+3'	Stadium: Cairo International Stadium; Referee: Pousri Armi Alfred (Chad)
Note: The match was played outside Ethiopia because the stadiums do not meet the requirements of the CAF.

29 September 2023 Second leg	Al Ahly (Egypt)	4–0 (7–0 agg.)	(Ethiopia) Saint George	Cairo
19:00 UTC+3	Afsha 10', 39'; Kahraba 34' (pen.), 63'	Report		Stadium: Cairo International Stadium; Referee: Boubou Traoré (Mali)

==== Group stage ====
The draw for the group stage was held on 6 October 2023.

Pos	Team	Pld	W	D	L	GF	GA	GD	Pts	Qualification	AHL	YNG	CRB	MED
1	(Egypt) Al Ahly	6	3	3	0	6	1	+5	12	Advance to knockout stage	—	1–0	0–0	3–0
2	(Tanzania) Young Africans	6	2	2	2	9	6	+3	8 (Note: Ranked on head-to-head goal difference: Young Africans +1, CR Belouizdad –1.)	Advance to knockout stage	1–1	—	4–0	3–0
3	(Algeria) CR Belouizdad	6	2	2	2	7	6	+1	8		0–0	3–0	—	3–0
4	(Ghana) Medeama	6	1	1	4	3	12	−9	4		0–1	1–1	2–1	—

Source: CAF
Rules for classification: Group stage tiebreakers
Notes:

25 November 2023 1	Al Ahly (Egypt)	3–0	(Ghana) Medeama	Cairo
21:00 UTC+2	Kahraba 66'; El Shahat 75'; Mohsen 88'			Stadium: Al Salam Stadium; Referee: Boubou Traoré (Mali)

2 December 2023 2	Young Africans (Tanzania)	1–1	(Egypt) Al Ahly	Dar es Salaam, Tanzania
19:00 UTC+3	Zouzoua 90+1'		Tau 86'	Stadium: Benjamin Mkapa Stadium; Referee: Abdel Aziz Mohamed Bouh (Mauritania)

8 December 2023 3	Al Ahly (Egypt)	0–0	(Algeria) CR Belouizdad	Alexandria
21:00 UTC+2				Stadium: Borg El Arab Stadium; Referee: Peter Waweru (Kenya)

16 February 2024 (Note: Rescheduled due to Al Ahly's participation in the 2023 FIFA Club World Cup.) 4	CR Belouizdad (Algeria)	0–0	(Egypt) Al Ahly	Algiers, Algeria
20:00 UTC+1		Report		Stadium: Stade du 5 Juillet; Referee: Samuel Uwikunda (Rwanda)

23 February 2024 5	Medeama (Ghana)	0–1	(Egypt) Al Ahly	Kumasi, Ghana
16:00 UTC+0		Report	El Shahat 48'	Stadium: Baba Yara Stadium; Referee: Patrice Tanguy Mebiame (Gabon)

1 March 2024 6	Al Ahly (Egypt)	1–0	(Tanzania) Young Africans	Cairo
18:00 UTC+2	El Shahat 46'	Report		Stadium: Cairo International Stadium; Referee: Djindo Louis Houngnandande (Benin)

==== Knockout stage ====
===== Quarter-finals =====
The draw for the quarter-finals was held on 12 March 2024.

29 March 2024 First leg	Simba (Tanzania)	0–1	(Egypt) Al Ahly	Dar es Salaam, Tanzania
21:00 UTC+3		Report	Koka 4'	Stadium: Benjamin Mkapa Stadium; Referee: Abongile Tom (South Africa)

5 April 2024 Second leg	Al Ahly (Egypt)	2–0 (3–0 agg.)	(Tanzania) Simba	Cairo
22:00 UTC+2	El Solia 47'; Kahraba 90+9' (pen.)	Report		Stadium: Cairo International Stadium; Referee: Alhadi Allaou Mahamat (Chad)

==== Semi-finals ====
20 April 2024 First leg	TP Mazembe (Democratic Republic of the Congo)	0–0	(Egypt) Al Ahly	Lubumbashi, DR Congo
15:00 UTC+2		Report		Stadium: Stade TP Mazembe; Referee: Pacifique Ndabihawenimana (Burundi)

24 April 2024 Second leg	Al Ahly (Egypt)	3–0 (3–0 agg.)	(Democratic Republic of the Congo) TP Mazembe	Cairo
21:00 UTC+3	Abdelmonem 61'; Abou Ali 83'; Tawfik 90+12'	Report		Stadium: Cairo International Stadium; Attendance: 50,000; Referee: Peter Waweru (Kenya)

==== Final ====
18 May 2024 First leg	ES Tunis (Tunisia)	0–0	(Egypt) Al Ahly	Rades, Tunisia
22:00 UTC+3		Report		Stadium: Stade Olympique Hammadi Agrebi; Referee: Mustapha Ghorbal (Algeria)

25 May 2024 Second leg	Al Ahly (Egypt)	1–0 (1–0 agg.)	(Tunisia) ES Tunis	Cairo
20:00 UTC+3	Aholou 4' (o.g.)	Report		Stadium: Cairo International Stadium; Attendance: 50,000; Referee: Jean Ndala (DR Congo)

=== African Football League ===
The draw was held on 2 September 2023.

==== Quarter-finals ====
20 October 2023 First leg	Simba (Tanzania)	2–2	(Egypt) Al Ahly	Dar es Salaam, Tanzania
18:00 UTC+3	Denis 53'; Kanouté 59'	Report	Slim 45+1'; Kahraba 63'	Stadium: National Stadium; Attendance: 60,000; Referee: Dahane Beida (Mauritania)

24 October 2023 Second leg	Al Ahly (Egypt)	1–1 (3–3 agg.)	(Tanzania) Simba	Cairo
17:00 UTC+3	Kahraba 76'	Report	Kanouté 68'	Stadium: Cairo International Stadium; Attendance: 30,000; Referee: Jean-Jacques Ndala Ngambo (DR Congo)

==== Semi-finals ====
29 October 2023 First leg	Mamelodi Sundowns (South Africa)	1–0	(Egypt) Al Ahly	Pretoria, South Africa
15:00 UTC+2	Maseko 52'	Report		Stadium: Loftus Versfeld Stadium; Attendance: 30,000; Referee: Djindo Louis Houngnandande (Benin)

1 November 2023 Second leg	Al Ahly (Egypt)	0–0 (0–1 agg.)	(South Africa) Mamelodi Sundowns	Cairo
20:00 UTC+2		Report		Stadium: Cairo International Stadium; Attendance: 50,000; Referee: Issa Sy (Senegal)

=== CAF Super Cup ===
15 September 2023 Final	Al Ahly (Egypt)	0–1	(Algeria) USM Alger	Taif, Saudi Arabia
21:00 UTC+3			Belaïd 43' (pen.)	Stadium: King Fahd Sports City; Referee: Pierre Atcho (Gabon)

=== FIFA Club World Cup ===
The draw was held on 5 September 2023.

15 December 2023 Quarter-finals	Al Ahly (Egypt)	3–1	(Saudi Arabia) Al-Ittihad	Jeddah, Saudi Arabia
21:00 UTC+3	Maâloul 21' (pen.); El Shahat 59'; Ashour 62'	Report	Benzema 90+2'	Stadium: King Abdullah Sports City; Attendance: 56,111; Referee: Jesús Valenzuela (Venezuela)

18 December 2023 Semi-finals	Fluminense (Brazil)	2–0	(Egypt) Al Ahly	Jeddah, Saudi Arabia
21:00 UTC+3	Arias 71' (pen.); Kennedy 90'	Report		Stadium: King Abdullah Sports City; Attendance: 34,986; Referee: Szymon Marciniak (Poland)

22 December 2023 Match for third place	Urawa Red Diamonds (Japan)	2–4	(Egypt) Al Ahly	Jeddah, Saudi Arabia
17:30 UTC+3	Kanté 43'; Scholz 54' (pen.)	Report	Ibrahim 19'; Tau 25'; Koizumi 60' (o.g.); Maâloul 90+8'	Stadium: Prince Abdullah Al-Faisal Sports City; Attendance: 10,290; Referee: Tori Penso (United States)
