= 2023 Egyptian Super Cup final =

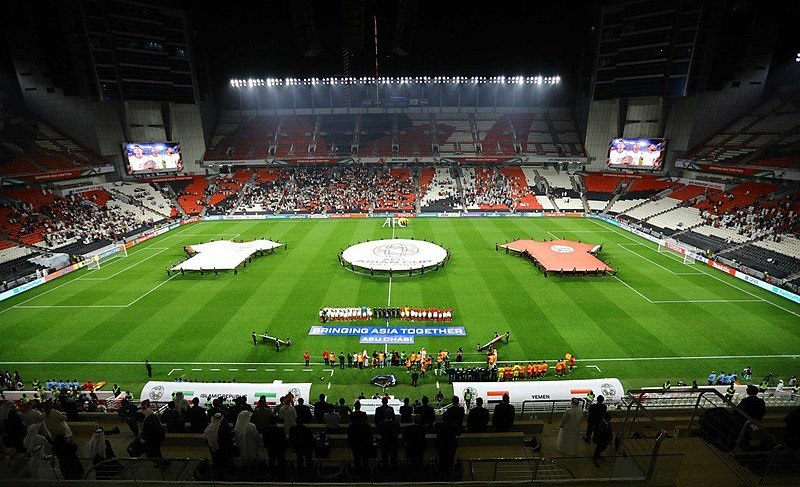
- Mohammed bin Zayed Stadium hosted the match
Al Ahly	Modern Future
4	2
- After extra time
- Date: 28 December 2023
- Venue: Mohammed bin Zayed Stadium, Abu Dhabi
- Man of the Match: Marwan Attia (Al Ahly)
- Referee: Mohamed Adel
- Attendance: 30,000
- Weather: Fair; 23 °C (73 °F); 73% humidity

The 2023 Egyptian Super Cup final was the final match of the 2023–24 Egyptian Super Cup, the 21st edition of the competition since its establishment in 2001, and the first under the new four-team format. It was contested by Al Ahly and Modern Future on 28 December 2023 at Mohammed bin Zayed Stadium in Abu Dhabi, United Arab Emirates.

Al Ahly won the match 4–2 at extra time after a 2–2 draw within 90 minutes, winning a record-extending 14th Egyptian Super Cup title.

== Route to the final ==
Al Ahly		Round	Modern Future	
Opponent	Result	2023–24 Egyptian Super Cup	Opponent	Result
Ceramica Cleopatra	1–0	Semi-finals	Pyramids	0–0 (14–13 p)

== Officials ==
The match officials were announced on 27 December 2023. Mohamed Adel was selected as the main referee, with Mahmoud Abou El Regal and Ahmed Hossam Taha chosen as the assistant referees, Mohamed Maarouf as the fourth official, and Ahmed Tawfik as the reserve assistant referee. Mahmoud Ashour and Youssef El Bosaty were selected as the video assistant referee and the assistant video assistant referee, respectively.

== Match ==
=== Details ===
28 December 2023
21:00 GST

Al Ahly	4–2 (a.e.t.)	Modern Future
Kahraba 13'; El Shahat 34'; Modeste 114'; Fouad 116'	Report	El Said 76'; Mahmoud 81'

Mohammed bin Zayed Stadium, Abu Dhabi
Attendance: 30,000
Referee: Mohamed Adel

Al Ahly	Modern Future

GK	31	(Egypt) Mostafa Shobeir	(yellow card) 120+3'
RB	30	(Egypt) Mohamed Hany		(substituted off) 106'
CB	5	(Egypt) Ramy Rabia (c)
CB	24	(Egypt) Mohamed Abdelmonem
LB	21	(Tunisia) Ali Maâloul
CM	36	(Egypt) Ahmed Nabil Koka		(substituted off) 88'
CM	13	(Egypt) Marwan Attia	(yellow card) 100'
AM	10	(South Africa) Percy Tau		(substituted off) 76'
RW	22	(Egypt) Emam Ashour		(substituted off) 76'
LW	14	(Egypt) Hussein El Shahat		(substituted off) 64'
CF	7	(Egypt) Mahmoud Kahraba		(substituted off) 76'
Substitutes:
GK	16	(Egypt) Hamza Alaa
DF	2	(Egypt) Khaled Abdelfattah
DF	8	(Egypt) Akram Tawfik		(substituted in) 106'
DF	28	(Egypt) Karim Fouad		(substituted in) 76'
MF	15	(Mali) Aliou Dieng
MF	17	(Egypt) Amr El Solia		(substituted in) 76'
MF	19	(Egypt) Mohamed Magdy		(substituted in) 88'
FW	27	(France) Anthony Modeste		(substituted in) 76'
FW	29	(Egypt) Taher Mohamed	(yellow card) 118'	(substituted in) 64'
Manager:
(Switzerland) Marcel Koller

GK	16	(Egypt) Mahmoud Genish (c)
RB	2	(Egypt) Basem Ali
CB	6	(Egypt) Ali El Fil		(substituted off) 46'
CB	26	(Egypt) Mohamed Rabia
LB	13	(Cameroon) Jonathan Ngwem
DM	31	(Nigeria) Babatunde Bello		(substituted off) 58'
CM	30	(Egypt) Ahmed Atef
CM	28	(Egypt) Mohamed Sadek	(yellow card) 40'	(substituted off) 70'
RW	27	(Egypt) Ghanam Mohamed
LW	22	(Morocco) Abdelkabir El Ouadi		(substituted off) 58'
CF	9	(Egypt) Marwan Mohsen		(substituted off) 72'
Substitutes:
GK	1	(Egypt) Mahmoud Hamdy
DF	4	(Egypt) Mahmoud Rizk
DF	5	(Egypt) Mohamed Abdel Salam
MF	14	(Egypt) Mohamed Mahmoud		(substituted in) 70'
MF	19	(Egypt) Ali Zaazaa	(yellow card) 48'	(substituted in) 46'
MF	29	(Egypt) Hesham Balaha		(substituted in) 58'
MF	35	(Benin) Hassane Imourane
FW	18	(Egypt) Omar El Said	(yellow card) 116'	(substituted in) 72'
FW	33	(The Gambia) Kajally Drammeh		(substituted in) 58'
Manager:
(Portugal) Ricardo Formosinho

Man of the Match:
Marwan Attia (Al Ahly)

Assistant referees:
Mahmoud Abou El Regal
Ahmed Hossam Taha
Fourth official:
Mohamed Maarouf
Reserve assistant referee:
Ahmed Tawfik
Video assistant referee:
Mahmoud Ashour
Assistant video assistant referee:
Youssef El Bosaty

Match rules

- 90 minutes
- 30 minutes of extra time if necessary
- Penalty shoot-out if scores still level
- Nine named substitutes
- Maximum of five substitutions, with a sixth allowed in extra time (Note: Each team was given only three opportunities to make substitutions, with a fourth opportunity in extra time, excluding substitutions made at half-time, before the start of extra time and at half-time in extra time.)
