= 2023–24 Modern Sport FC season =

Modern Sport FC
2023–24 season
- Manager: Ricardo Formosinho
- Stadium: Al Salam Stadium
- Egyptian Premier League: 5th
- Egypt Cup: Quarter-finals
- Egyptian League Cup: Group stage
- CAF Confederation Cup: Quarter-finals
- Top goalscorer: Arnold Eba (7)

The 2023–24 Modern Sport FC season was the club's 13th season in existence and the third consecutive season in the top flight of Egyptian football. In addition to the domestic league, Modern Sport participated in this season's editions of the Egypt Cup, the League Cup and the CAF Confederation Cup.

== Squad ==
As of 1 February 2024

Note: Flags indicate national team as defined under FIFA eligibility rules; some limited exceptions apply. Players may hold more than one non-FIFA nationality.

No.	Pos.	Nation	Player
1	GK	EGY	Mahmoud Hamdy
2	DF	EGY	Basem Ali
3	FW	GUI	Hadji Barry
4	DF	EGY	Mahmoud Rizk
6	DF	EGY	Ali El Fil
7	MF	EGY	Amr El Sisi
9	FW	EGY	Marwan Mohsen
10	MF	EGY	Ahmed Refaat
11	DF	EGY	Tarek Taha
12	MF	EGY	Mohamed Nosseir
13	DF	CMR	Jonathan Ngwem
14	MF	EGY	Mohamed Mahmoud
15	MF	EGY	Abdallah Mohamed
16	GK	EGY	Mahmoud Genish (captain)
17	FW	EGY	Mohamed Farouk
18	FW	EGY	Omar El Said
19	MF	EGY	Ali Zazaa

No.	Pos.	Nation	Player
21	DF	EGY	Mahmoud Shaaban
22	FW	MAR	Abdelkabir El Ouadi
23	GK	EGY	Ahmed Yehia
24	DF	EGY	Khaled Reda
25	GK	EGY	Mohamed Tarek
26	DF	EGY	Mohamed Rabia (footballer, born 1996)
27	MF	EGY	Ghanam Mohamed
28	MF	EGY	Mohamed Sadek
30	FW	EGY	Ahmed Atef
31	MF	NGA	Bello Martins
33	FW	GAM	Kajally Drammeh
34	MF	EGY	Kabaka
35	MF	BEN	Hassane Imourane
37	DF	EGY	Abdelrahman Rashdan
38	MF	CMR	Arnold Eba
39	FW	EGY	Mohamed Zaalouk

== Transfers ==
=== In ===
Pos.	Player	Transferred from	Fee	Date	Source
MF	(Egypt) Mohamed Mahmoud	(Egypt) Al Ahly	Free	8 August 2023	
FW	(Egypt) Walid Mostafa	(Egypt) Al Ahly	Free	10 August 2023	
MF	(Egypt) Mohamed Nosseir	(Egypt) Al Ahly	Free	10 August 2023	
MF	(Egypt) Abdel Rahman Ashraf Mano	(Egypt) Al Ahly	Free	16 August 2023	
MF	(Gabon) Christ Bekale	(Moldova) Sheriff Tiraspol	Free	17 August 2023	
DF	(Egypt) Khaled Reda	(Egypt) ENPPI		17 August 2023	
FW	(The Gambia) Kajally Drammeh	(South Africa) Cape Town City	Loan	14 September 2023	
MF	(Egypt) Mohamed Sadek	(Egypt) Pyramids	Loan	14 September 2023	
MF	(Benin) Hassane Imourane	(Benin) Loto FC	Loan	14 September 2023	

=== Out ===
Pos.	Player	Transferred to	Fee	Date	Source
MF	(Egypt) Mostafa El Badry	(Egypt) Al Ahly	Loan return	20 July 2023	
MF	(Egypt) Karim Nedved	(Egypt) Al Ahly	Loan return	20 July 2023	
DF	(Egypt) Saad Samir	(Egypt) Al Ahly	Loan return	20 July 2023	
MF	(France) Abdallah Yaisien	Released		21 July 2023	
MF	(Egypt) Mohanad Lasheen	(Egypt) Pyramids	€1,003,000	10 August 2023	
DF	(Egypt) Mahmoud Marei	(Egypt) Pyramids	€1,004,000	12 August 2023	
MF	(Egypt) Mohamed Reda	(Egypt) Pyramids	€1,004,000	14 August 2023	
DF	(Egypt) Hesham Hafez	(Egypt) Baladiyat El Mahalla	Loan	1 September 2023	
MF	(Egypt) Ashraf Magdy	(Egypt) El Gouna	Loan	2 September 2023	

== Pre-season and friendlies ==
Win Draw Loss

28 August 2023 Friendly	Smouha (Egypt)	1–3	(Egypt) Modern Future	Alexandria
	El Badry	Report	El Ouadi; Zaazaa; Ahmed Atef	Stadium: Borg El Arab Stadium

2 September 2023 Friendly	Modern Future (Egypt)	3–2	(Egypt) Baladiyat El Mahalla
	Mohsen; Atef		Samana

5 September 2023 Friendly	Modern Future (Egypt)	0–1	(Egypt) Ismaily	Cairo
			Magdy	Stadium: Al Salam Stadium

9 September 2023 Friendly	Modern Future (Egypt)	1–1	(Egypt) El Gouna	Cairo
				Stadium: Al Salam Stadium

== Competitions ==
=== Overall record ===
Competition	First match	Last match	Starting round	Final position	Record							
Competition	First match	Last match	Starting round	Final position	Pld	W	D	L	GF	GA	GD	Win %
Egyptian Premier League	21 September 2023	17 August 2024	Matchday 1	5th	34	14	12	8	40	28	+12	41.18
Egypt Cup	1 June 2024	24 August 2024	Round of 32	Quarter-finals	3	2	0	1	4	1	+3	66.67
Egyptian League Cup	8 January 2024	24 January 2024	Group stage	Group stage	3	1	1	1	1	1	+0	33.33
CAF Confederation Cup	17 September 2023	7 April 2024	Second round	Quarter-finals	10	4	3	3	15	8	+7	40.00
Total					50	21	16	13	60	38	+22	42.00

Source: Competitions

=== Egyptian Premier League ===
==== League table ====
Pos	Team	Pld	W	D	L	GF	GA	GD	Pts	Qualification or relegation
3	Zamalek	34	17	8	9	53	37	+16	56 (Note: Zamalek were deducted three points for refusing to play their away fixture against Al Ahly, scheduled to be played on 25 June 2024.)	Qualification for the Confederation Cup second round (Note: Zamalek qualified for the Confederation Cup second round by winning the 2023–24 CAF Confederation Cup.)
4	Al Masry	34	16	7	11	41	39	+2	55	Qualification for the Confederation Cup second round (Note: The league was not finished by the CAF deadline for associations to submit teams participating in next season's CAF competitions. As a result, Al Masry, who finished the first half of the season at third place (and were also at third place by the time of the draw) qualified for the CAF Confederation Cup.)
5	Modern Future	34	14	12	8	40	28	+12	54 (Note: Head-to-head points: Modern Future 4, Smouha 1.)	
6	Smouha	34	15	9	10	39	35	+4	54	
7	ZED	34	13	12	9	48	35	+13	51	

Source: Soccerway
Rules for classification: 1) Points; 2) Head-to-head points; 3) Head-to-head goal difference; 4) Goal difference; 5) Goals scored; 6) Play-off tie.
(Note: Head-to-head records are used for final standings only)

==== Results summary ====
Overall								Home						Away					
Pld	W	D	L	GF	GA	GD	Pts	W	D	L	GF	GA	GD	W	D	L	GF	GA	GD
25	9	11	5	26	19	+7	38	3	6	3	11	10	+1	6	5	2	15	9	+6

Last updated: 19 June 2024.

==== Results by round ====
Round	1
Ground	A
Result	W
Position	2

A = Away; H = Home; W = Win; D = Draw; L = Loss

==== Matches ====
The league fixtures were unveiled on 11 September 2023.

21 September 2023 1	Pharco	0–2	Modern Future	Alexandria
16:00 UTC+3	Gamal (yellow card) 28'; Gehad (yellow card) 38'; El Bahrawi (yellow card) 49'; Naguib (yellow card) 64'	Report	Atef 45+2'; Rezk (yellow card) 49', (goal) 69'; Reda (yellow card) 52'; Noussier (yellow card) 90+3'	Stadium: Borg El Arab Stadium; Referee: Mahmoud Nagy

26 September 2023 2	Modern Future	2–1	El Dakhleya	Cairo
19:00 UTC+3	Bello (yellow card) 26'; Farouk (yellow card) 61'; Kamal 66'; Refaat 73' (pen.); Rezk (yellow card) 90+3'	Report	Kyambadde 42'; Abdelaziz (yellow card) 63'; Atef (penalty missed) 90+11'	Stadium: Cairo International Stadium; Referee: Tarek Magdy

7 October 2023 3	Tala'ea El Gaish	0–2	Modern Future	Cairo
19:00 UTC+3	Tarek (penalty missed) 51'		Kamal 44'; Mohsen 86'	Stadium: Gehaz El Reyada Stadium; Referee: Ahmed El Ghandour

22 October 2023 4	Modern Future	0–1	Pyramids	Cairo
19:00			Abdel Salam 57' (o.g.)	Stadium: Cairo International Stadium; Referee: Abdelaziz El Sayed

29 November 2023 7	Modern Future	0–2	Zamalek	Cairo
19:00 UTC+2	Rabia (yellow card) 42'		Zizo 39' (pen.); Ndiaye 45+3'	Stadium: Al Salam Stadium; Referee: Tarek Magdy

14 December 2023 9	Modern Future	1–1	Ceramica Cleopatra	Cairo
16:00 UTC+2	Mohsen 17'		Shokry 90+4'	Stadium: Al Salam Stadium; Referee: Sayed Munir

15 February 2024 12	Baladiyat El Mahalla	1–0	Modern Future	El Mahalla El Kubra
16:00 UTC+2	Marzouk 38'	Report		Stadium: El Mahalla Stadium; Referee: Mahmoud Bassiouni

19 February 2024 13	Modern Future	2–2	Al Mokawloon	Cairo
16:00 UTC+2	Zaazaa 12'; Atef 36'	Report	Salem 33'; Ochaya 45' (pen.)	Stadium: Cairo International Stadium; Referee: Walid Abdelrazek

29 February 2024 14	Smouha	1–1	Modern Future	Alexandria
19:00 UTC+2	Hassan 28' (pen.); El Maghraby (yellow card) 31' (yellow-red card) 44'		Rezk (yellow card) 24' (red card) 27'; Ngwem 45+8'	Stadium: Alexandria Stadium; Referee: Mohamed El Ghazi

7 March 2024 15	Modern Sport	0–0	ZED

11 March 2024 16	Al Ittihad	0–0	Modern Sport

11 April 2024 8	Al Masry	1–2	Modern Sport

14 April 2024 10	Ismaily	1–1	Modern Future	Ismailia
				Stadium: Ismailia Stadium

18 April 2024 18	Modern Sport	2–0	Pharco

22 April 2024 19	El Dakhleya	1–1	Modern Sport

2 May 2024 20	Modern Sport	0–0	Tala'ea Al Gaish

6 May 2024 21	Pyramids	2–1	Modern Sport

10 May 2024 22	Modern Sport	1–1	National Bank

16 May 2024 23	ENPPI	0–1	Modern Sport

23 May 2024 24	Zamalek	1–1	Modern Sport

26 May 2024 25	Modern Sport	0–0	Al Masry

13 June 2024 11	Modern Future	3–1	El Gouna	Cairo
Note: Postponed from 2 January.

19 June 2024 26	Ceramica Cleopatra	0–1	Modern Sport

23 June 2024 27	Modern Sport	0–1	Ismaily

27 June 2024 28	El Gouna	0–2	Modern Sport

3 July 2024 29	Modern Sport	1–0	Baladiyat El Mahalla

11 July 2024 30	Al Mokawloon Al Arab	1–2	Modern Sport

16 July 2024 17	Modern Sport	1–2	Al Ahly

22 July 2024 31	Modern Sport	3–0	Smouha

31 July 2024 32	ZED	3–2	Modern Sport	Cairo
21:00				Stadium: Cairo International Stadium

12 August 2024 33	Modern Sport	1–1	Al Ittihad	Cairo
21:00				Stadium: Cairo International Stadium

17 August 2024 34	Al Ahly	1–2	Modern Sport	Cairo
21:00				Stadium: Cairo International Stadium

=== Egypt Cup ===
1 June 2024 Round of 32	Modern Future	3–0	Petrol Asyut

20 August 2024 Round of 16	Modern Sport	1–0	ENPPI

24 August 2024 Quarter-finals	Modern Sport	0–1	ZED

=== CAF Confederation Cup ===
==== Second round ====
The draw for the qualifying rounds was held on 25 July 2023.

17 September 2023 First leg	Singida Fountain Gate (Tanzania)	1–0	(Egypt) Modern Future	Dar es Salaam, Tanzania
16:00 UTC+3	Rupia 53'			Stadium: Chamazi Stadium; Referee: Jelly Chavani (South Africa)

1 October 2023 Second leg	Modern Future (Egypt)	4–1 (4–2 agg.)	(Tanzania) Singida Fountain Gate	Cairo
18:00 UTC+3	Atef 5'; Refaat 53' (pen.); Kamal 68'; Maher 90+7'		Tchakei 28'	Stadium: Al Salam Stadium; Referee: Dahane Beida (Mauritania)

==== Group stage ====
The draw for the group stage was held on 6 October 2023.

Pos	Team	Pld	W	D	L	GF	GA	GD	Pts	Qualification	USMA	MOF	HIL	SSU
1	(Algeria) USM Alger	6	4	1	1	8	3	+5	13	Advance to knockout stage	—	1–0	2–0	2–1
2	(Egypt) Modern Future	6	3	2	1	9	3	+6	11	Advance to knockout stage	0–0	—	5–0	1–0
3	(Libya) Al Hilal Benghazi	6	2	0	4	6	13	−7	6		2–1	1–2	—	2–1
4	(South Africa) SuperSport United	6	1	1	4	5	9	−4	4		0–2	1–1	2–1	—

Source: CAF
Rules for classification: Group stage tiebreakers

26 November 2023 1	Modern Future (Egypt)	1–0	(South Africa) SuperSport United	Cairo
15:00 UTC+2	Mohamed 76'	Report		Stadium: Al Salam Stadium; Referee: Jean Ouattara (Burkina Faso)

3 December 2023 2	Al Hilal Benghazi (Libya)	1–2	(Egypt) Modern Future	Benghazi, Libya
18:00 UTC+2	Adrees 3'	Report	Mohsen 65'; Drammeh 90+2'	Stadium: Benina Martyrs Stadium; Referee: Jalal Jayed (Morocco)

10 December 2023 3	USM Alger (Algeria)	1–0	(Egypt) Modern Future	Stade du 5 Juillet, Algiers
20:00 UTC+1	Kanu 65'	Report		Referee: Ahmad Imtehaz Heeralall (Mauritius)

20 December 2023 4	Modern Future (Egypt)	0–0	(Algeria) USM Alger	Cairo
18:00 UTC+2		Report		Stadium: Al Salam Stadium; Referee: Abdel Aziz Mohamed Bouh (Mauritania)

25 February 2024 5	SuperSport United (South Africa)	1–1	(Egypt) Modern Future	Polokwane, South Africa
15:00 UTC+2	Matodzi 69'	Report	Zaazaa 31'	Stadium: Peter Mokaba Stadium; Referee: Messie Nkounkou (Congo)

3 March 2024 6	Modern Future (Egypt)	5–0	(Libya) Al Hilal Benghazi	Cairo
--:-- UTC+2	Zaazaa 22'; Sadek 45'; Atef 55', 88'; Al Msmari 69' (o.g.)	Report		Stadium: Al Salam Stadium; Referee: Pacifique Ndabihawenimana (Burundi)
