= 2023–24 Egyptian Super Cup =

Egyptian football competition played in the United Arab Emirates

كأس السوبر المصري 2023/24

Tournament details
- Host country: UAE
- City: Abu Dhabi
- Dates: 25–28 December 2023
- Teams: 4

Final positions
- Champions: Al Ahly (14th title)
- Runners-up: Modern Future
- Third place: Pyramids
- Fourth place: Ceramica Cleopatra

Tournament statistics
- Matches played: 4
- Goals scored: 9 (2.25 per match)
- Top scorer(s): 8 players (1 goal each)

The 2023–24 Egyptian Super Cup, officially the NBE Egyptian Super Cup for sponsorship purposes, was the 21st edition of the Egyptian Super Cup, and the first edition under the new four-team format. It was contested by teams that were successful in the preceding season of Egyptian football.

Al Ahly were the defending champions, and successfully defended the title after beating Modern Future 4–2 at extra time in the final, winning a record-extending 14th Egyptian Super Cup title.

== Format ==
This season's tournament is characterized by a new format, where four teams will compete instead of the usual two teams.

The draw was held on 27 September 2023.

== Qualified teams ==
The following four teams qualified for the tournament.

Team	Method of qualification
Al Ahly	2022–23 Egyptian Premier League winners
Ceramica Cleopatra	2022–23 Egyptian League Cup winners
Pyramids	2022–23 Egyptian Premier League runners-up
Modern Future	2022–23 Egyptian Premier League fourth place (Note: Since the 2022–23 Egypt Cup wasn't finished by the time of the Egyptian Super Cup, the third placed-team in the Egyptian Premier League, Zamalek, was originally planned to enter the competition. However, the club was excluded due to their withdrawal from the previous edition. As a result, Modern Future, the highest-ranked team in the league not qualified to the Super Cup, was chosen to enter the competition.)

== Bracket ==
Semi-finals
25 December 2023
Al Ahly	1
Ceramica Cleopatra	0
25 December 2023
Modern Future (p)	0 (14)
Pyramids	0 (13)

Final
28 December 2023
Al Ahly (a.e.t.)	4
Modern Future	2
Third place match
28 December 2023
Ceramica Cleopatra	1 (4)
Pyramids (p)	1 (5)

== Matches ==
All times are GST (UTC+4).

=== Semi-finals ===
25 December 2023	Modern Future	0–0 (14–13 p)	Pyramids	Abu Dhabi
17:00		Report		Stadium: Mohammed bin Zayed Stadium; Referee: Amin Omar
	Penalties
	Ali (penalty scored); El Ouadi (penalty scored); Adel (penalty missed); Atef (penalty scored); Mahmoud (penalty scored); Ghanam (penalty missed); Rabia (penalty scored); Ngwem (penalty scored); El Fil (penalty scored); Bello (penalty missed); Genish (penalty scored); Ali (penalty scored); El Ouadi (penalty scored); Atef (penalty scored); Mahmoud (penalty scored); Ngwem (penalty scored); Rabia (penalty scored)		(penalty scored) El Said; (penalty scored) Sobhi; (penalty scored) Hafez; (penalty missed) Lakay; (penalty scored) El Gabbas; (penalty missed) Galal; (penalty scored) Reda; (penalty scored) Chibi; (penalty scored) Samy; (penalty missed) Lasheen; (penalty scored) Mayhoub; (penalty scored) El Said; (penalty scored) Sobhi; (penalty scored) Hafez; (penalty scored) Reda; (penalty scored) El Gabbas; (penalty missed) Galal

25 December 2023	Al Ahly	1–0	Ceramica Cleopatra	Abu Dhabi
21:00	Arthur 90+4' (o.g.)	Report		Stadium: Mohammed bin Zayed Stadium; Referee: Mohamed Maarouf

=== Third place match ===
28 December 2023	Ceramica Cleopatra	1–1 (4–5 p)	Pyramids	Abu Dhabi
17:00	Kendouci 70'	Report	M. Fathi 78'	Stadium: Mohammed bin Zayed Stadium; Referee: Mahmoud El Banna
	Penalties
	Rayyan (penalty scored); Ramadan (penalty scored); Shokry (penalty scored); Nabil (penalty scored); Tony (penalty missed)		(penalty scored) El Said; (penalty scored) Sobhi; (penalty scored) Hafez; (penalty scored) El Karti; (penalty scored) Lakay

=== Final ===
28 December 2023
21:00 GST

Al Ahly	4–2 (a.e.t.)	Modern Future
Kahraba 13'; El Shahat 34'; Modeste 114'; Fouad 116'	Report	El Said 76'; Mahmoud 81'

Mohammed bin Zayed Stadium, Abu Dhabi
Attendance: 30,000
Referee: Mohamed Adel

== Prize money ==
The prizes will be awarded by the Abu Dhabi Sports Council and are as follows:

- Winners: $250,000
- Runners-up: $125,000
- Third-place: $75,000
- Fourth-place: $50,000
