= Mohamed Abdel Salam =

Mohamed Abdel Salam may refer to:

- Mohamed Abd El-Salam (born 1982), Egyptian handball player
- Mohamed Abdelsalam (footballer, born 1987) (born 1987), Egyptian footballer
- Mohamed Abdel Salam (footballer, born 1997) (born 1997), Egyptian footballer
