= Seth Kwame Boateng =

Ghanaian journalist

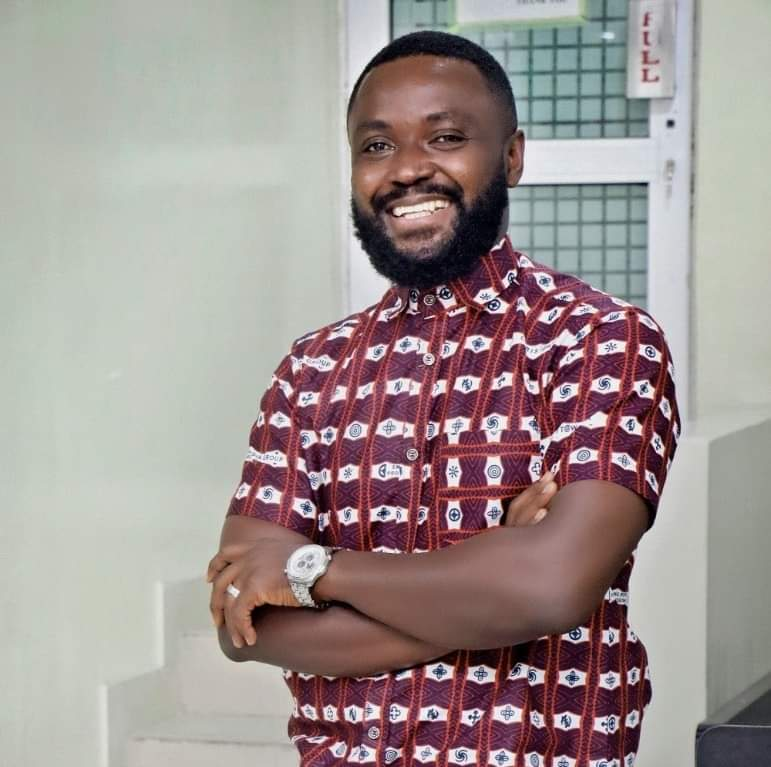
- Born: Seth Kwame Boateng; Asokwa, Kumasi Ghana
- Education: University of Leeds, University of Ghana Kofi Annan International Peacekeeping Training Centre University of Cape Coast and Anglican Senior High School, Kumasi
- Occupation: Investigative journalist
- Years active: 2003–present
- Known for: Documentaries and Multimedia Ghana Limited
- Notable work: Next to die, Left to rot

Seth Kwame Boateng is a Ghanaian journalist, notable for his impactful journalistic work, as recognized by the WHO, The US State Department, International Center for Journalist (ICFJ), and Media Foundation for West Africa. In 2015, he emerged as the GJA Journalist of the Year.

== Early life and education ==
Boateng was born at Asokwa in Kumasi into a challenging family, being the youngest of 17 children. He has earned three master's degrees. His most recent degree was obtained from the University of Leeds in 2019, where he studied public health, health management planning, and policy. Before that, he received a master's degree in communication studies from the University of Ghana in 2016 and another from the Kofi Annan International Peacekeeping Training Centre (KAIPTC) in conflict peace and security.

For his undergraduate education, Boateng studied economics and sociology at the University of Cape Coast, completing his bachelor's degree from 2003 to 2007. His high school education took place at Kumasi Anglican Senior High School.

== Career ==
Boateng started his career as a front desk executive at Luv FM, a subsidiary of Multimedia Ghana Limited, in 2003. He venture into journalism when he recounted from Cape Coast, on Luv Fm, via a telephone interview on live radio, the story of a young lady who was stabbed by her boyfriend at the Kwame Nkrumah Hall at the University of Cape Coast in 2003. This caught the admiration of the then news editor, the late Saeed Ali Yaqub who asked him to join the news team when he vacated an returned to Luv FM to continue his front desk duties.

While pursuing his undergraduate studies at the University of Cape Coast, Boateng volunteered at the campus-based radio station, Radio Valco. He rose through the ranks to become the head of news.

In 2007, Boateng was posted to Joy FM for his national service, and upon completion, he was retained as a permanent staff member. As of 2020, he holds the position of assistant editor and stands as one of the longest-serving members of the media house.

== Notable works ==
Boateng has produced a series of impactful features and documentaries that have gone viral, capturing the attention of chief justices, first ladies, vice presidents, the clergy, traditional rulers and academia. Some of them are;

=== Crushed ===
Produced by Boateng, the documentary shares heartbreaking stories of families coping with the loss of loved ones in road accidents. It explores the emotions and challenges these families endure, providing a closer look at the profound impact of road accidents on people's lives.

==== Crushed young ====
Crushed Young is a documentary that aims to help deal with the growing problem of road accidents in the country, especially how they affect young people. This is the second version of the original Crushed, focusing more on the specific issues faced by young individuals in road accidents.

=== Next to die ===
In his documentary, Boateng investigated the overcrowded and unsanitary conditions prevalent at the Komfo Anokye Teaching Hospital in the Ashanti region of Ghana. Alarming reports from medical professionals reveal a distressing statistic: one-fifth of newborns delivered at the hospital succumb to mortality, surpassing Ghana's already elevated newborn mortality rate of 32 out of 1,000 babies. Despite plans for a new hospital since 1974, political factors have continually impeded its progress. This documentary prompted immediate action as he collaborated with the country's first lady, Rebecca Akufo-Addo spearheading a campaign that successfully garnered $2 million for the construction of a new baby unit. There was anticipation that this newly constructed unit would reduce the number of deaths to approximately six newborn deaths per day.

=== Locked and Forgotten ===
This documentary, Locked and Forgotten is a documentary produced in 2015 that looked into the challenges faced by remand prisoners in Ghana. Subsequent to the release of this documentary, the Chief Justice of Ghana at the time, Justice Georgina Wood implemented measures resulting in the release of hundred pre-trial detainees who had previously languished in jail for extended periods. Additionally, the then President of Ghana, John Mahama made his inaugural visit to the prisons to gain firsthand insight into the prevailing conditions.

=== Left to rot ===
Seth Kwame Boateng made a documentary to show how tough it is in Ghana's prisons and wants people to support efforts to make things better. He talks about the difficult conditions prisoners face and hopes the documentary encourages everyone to work together for positive changes in the Ghanaian prison system.

== Awards and honours ==
Boateng has won several awards, both in Ghana and internationally. Some of them are:

Year	Award	Results
2023	George Ayittey Memorial (GAM) Award for Excellence in Media and Journalism.	Won
2019	GJA Best Human Rights Reporter GJA Best in Features on TV category	Won Won
2018	WAMECA Journalist of the year in West Africa WAMECA Best reporter for the Human Rights Reporting	Won Won
2017	WAMECA Journalist of the year in West Africa The Man of the Year in the Communication Category at the 2017 EMY Africa Awards ICFJ Global Health Reporting Award	Won Won
2015	GJA PAV Ansah Journalist of the Year Award GJA Best Features on TV category GJA Best Features on radio category	Won Won Won

- Humanitarian Awards Global awarded Boateng as a 2022 Honorary Humanitarian/Journalist in Ghana
- In 2022, he was honored with the Innovation and Initiative Award in Journalism of the Year by the Ghana Leadership Awards
- In 2019, Boateng was inducted into the Ghana leadership hall of fame after winning four categories of the Ghana Leadership Awards
- Boateng received Judicial Service Award for promoting the success of the Justice For All Programme (JFAP) in 2018
- Young Professional Role Model Awards for 2018
- In 2018, he won the MTN Heroes of Change
- CIMG President's Special Awards in 2017
- MFWA named Seth Kwame Boateng in June, 2017 as the first winner of its Journalist of the Month series

== Personal life ==
Boateng is married with three children.
