= Marwan Attia =

Egyptian footballer (born 1998)

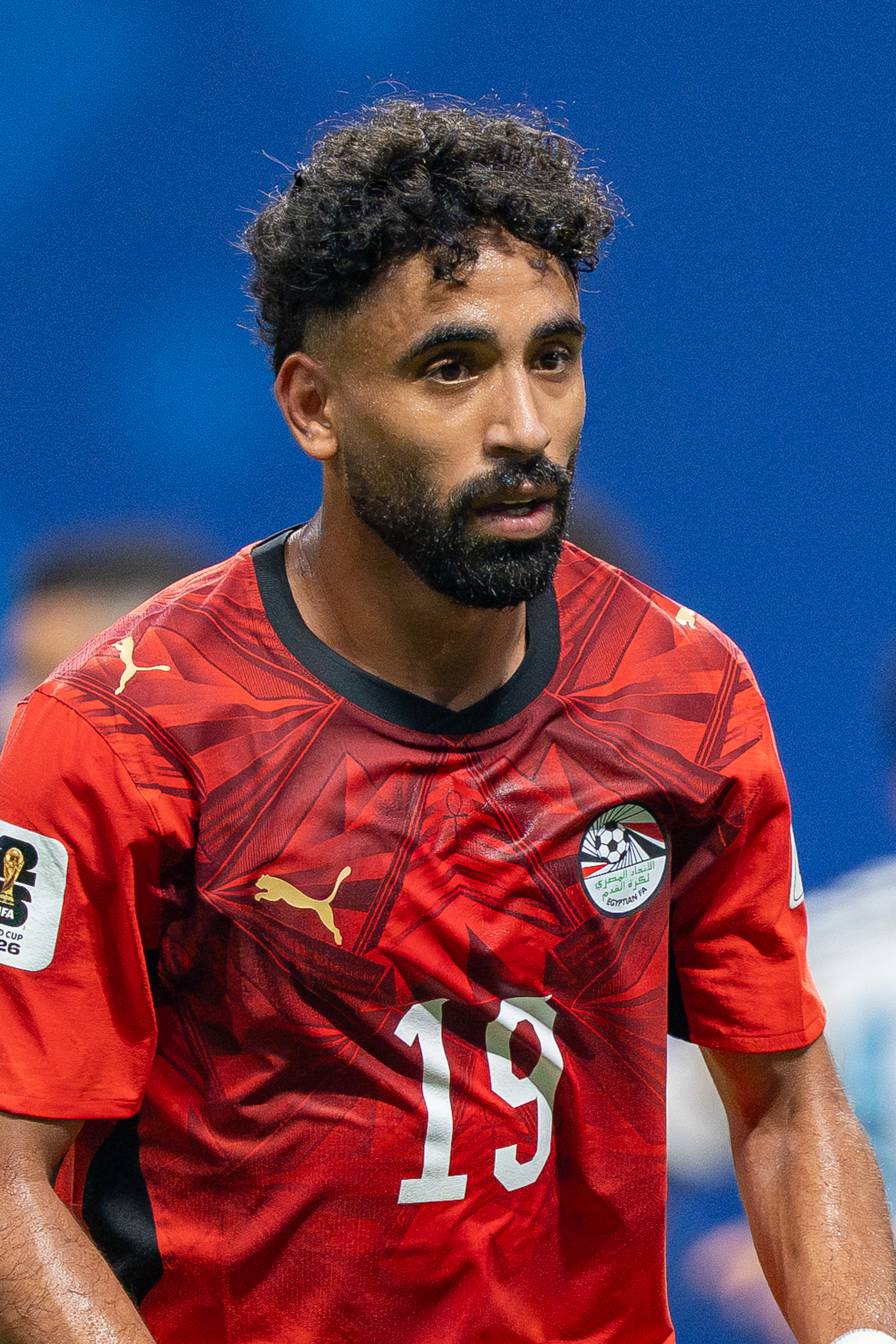
- Attia with Egypt in 2026

Personal information
- Full name: Marwan Attia Fahim Ghallab Rashwan
- Date of birth: 1 August 1998 (age 28)
- Place of birth: Kafr El Dawwar, Egypt
- Height: 1.76 m (5 ft 9 in)
- Position: Midfielder

Team information
- Current team: Al Ahly
- Number: 13

Senior career*
Years	Team	Apps	(Gls)
2019–2023	Al Ittihad	92	(1)
2023–	Al Ahly	61	(2)

International career^{‡}
2023–	Egypt	40	(1)
- * Club domestic league appearances and goals as of 19 July 2024 ‡ National team caps and goals as of 7 July 2026

Marwan Attia Fahim Ghallab (Note: Arabic: مروان عطية فاهم غلاب رشوان) (born 1 August 1998) is an Egyptian footballer who plays as a midfielder for Egyptian Premier League club Al Ahly and the Egypt national team.

== Club career ==
Attia began his career within the youth system of Al Ittihad Alexandria, eventually being promoted to the first team ahead of the 2019–2020 season under manager Talaat Youssef.

He signed with Al Ahly SC in the middle of the 2022–23 season amid interest from arch-rivals Zamalek SC on a four-and-a-half-year contract.

Attia established himself as a regular for club and country. He helped Al Ahly win three Egyptian Premier League titles and two CAF Champions League crowns. In 2023, Attia won man of the match in the 2023 Egyptian Super Cup final. In 2025, Marwan Attia won the Best Player award after stellar performances in the Egyptian Super Cup. Al Ahly extended his contract till 2030.

== International career ==
He was called up for the first time to the Egyptian national team in August 2022, before making his first appearance on 24 March 2023.

On 2 December 2025, Attia was called up to the Egypt squad for the 2025 Africa Cup of Nations.

He was named in the 26-man squad for the 2026 FIFA World Cup. On 7 July 2026, in the round of 16 of the 2026 FIFA World Cup in North America against Argentina, Mostafa Ziko had a goal controversially disallowed by referee François Letexier following a VAR review; the referee ruled that Marwan Attia had fouled Argentina's Lisandro Martínez in the buildup by stepping on his foot, disallowing the resulting goal. Critics noted the incident occurred several seconds before the goal and far from the scoring action, though the decision was technically grounded in the IFAB rules governing the VAR protocol. Argentina came from behind, after initially going down 2–0, to win the match 3–2 late on.

== Personal life ==
Attia's father died on 13 July 2023, while Attia was in a camp preparing for the Zamalek match. He married his fiancée, Salma Saqr, on 25 July 2024, after postponing it from last year due to the death of his father. In July 2025, his first daughter was born.

== Career statistics ==
=== Club ===
As of 15 December 2023

Appearances and goals by club, season and competition
Club	Season	League			National Cup		Continental		Other (Note: Includes Egyptian Super Cup, FIFA Club World Cup, African Football League and CAF Super Cup)		Total	
Club	Season	Division	Apps	Goals	Apps	Goals	Apps	Goals	Apps	Goals	Apps	Goals
Al Ittihad	2019–20	Egyptian Premier League	19	0	2	0	0	0	0	0	21	0
Al Ittihad	2020–21	Egyptian Premier League	29	0	0	0	0	0	0	0	29	0
Al Ittihad	2021–22	Egyptian Premier League	33	0	0	0	0	0	0	0	33	0
Al Ittihad	2022–23	Egyptian Premier League	11	1	0	0	0	0	0	0	11	1
Al Ittihad	Total		92	1	2	0	0	0	0	0	94	1
Al Ahly	2022–23	Egyptian Premier League	16	0	2	0	10	0	3	0	31	0
Al Ahly	2023–24	Egyptian Premier League	3	0	2	0	4	0	6	0	15	0
Al Ahly	Total		19	0	4	0	14	0	9	0	46	0
Career total			111	1	6	0	14	0	9	0	140	1

=== International ===
As of match played 7 July 2026

Appearances and goals by national team and year
National team	Year	Apps	Goals
Egypt	2023	6	0
Egypt	2024	13	0
Egypt	2025	9	0
Egypt	2026	12	1
Total		40	1

Scores and results list Egypt's goal tally first, score column indicates score after each Attia goal.

List of international goals scored by Marwan Attia
No.	Date	Venue	Opponent	Score	Result	Competition
1	5 January 2026	Adrar Stadium, Adrar, Morocco	Benin	1–0	3–1	2025 Africa Cup of Nations

== Honours ==
Al Ahly

- Egyptian Premier League: 2022–23, 2023–24 2024-25
- Egypt Cup: 2021–22, 2022–23
- Egyptian Super Cup: 2022–23, 2023–24, 2025
- CAF Champions League: 2022–23, 2023-24
- FIFA African–Asian–Pacific Cup: 2024
