= Elvis Sakyi =

Ghanaian footballer

Personal information
- Date of birth: 24 November 1996 (age 29)
- Place of birth: Accra, Ghana
- Height: 1.82 m (6 ft 0 in)
- Position: Defensive midfielder

Youth career
- Cheetah FC

Senior career*
Years	Team	Apps	(Gls)
2017	Cheetah FC	-	(-)
2017–2018	Istanbul Maltepespor	-	(-)
2018–2019	Larnaka GB	-	(-)
2019	Gżira United	0	(0)
2019–2020	Senglea Athletic	14	(0)
2020–2021	Maccabi Petah Tikva	17	(0)
2021–2022	Hapoel Afula	18	(0)
2022	Primorje	0	(0)
2022–2023	Samgurali	3	(0)
2023	Ferroviário Beira	14	(0)
2023–2024	Al Ittihad Misurata	18	(0)
2024–2025	Al-Anwar	15	(2)
2025–2026	Persijap Jepara	13	(0)
- * Club domestic league appearances and goals as of 3 January 2026

Elvis Sakyi (born 24 November 1996) is a Ghanaian professional footballer who plays as a defensive midfielder. Sakyi is a graduate of Kumasi Anglican High School where he played in the school team before joining Ghanaian lower-tier side Cheetah FC. He has had stints in Malta playing for Gżira United and Senglea Athletic. At the international level, he played for the Ghana national under-17 football team.

== Early life ==
Sakyi was born on 24 November 1996. He had his secondary school education at Kumasi Anglican High School where he played in the school's football team where he won several laurels including both the regional and national inter-schools championships.

== Club career ==
=== Early career ===
Sakyi began his career at Ghanaian side Cheetah FC before signing for Turkish team Istanbul Maltepespor in 2017 on a one-year deal. In 2016, the former Ghana U17 star underwent a trials at Turkish giants Galatasaray, Eskişehirspor and Yeni Malatyaspor before joining Maltepespor Kulubu. He failed to land a deal with Eskişehirspor due to an imposed transfer ban on the club. He went on and played in Northern Cyprus for Gençler Birliği S.K. based in Larnaca from 2018 to 2019.

=== Gżira United ===
On 25 July 2019, Sakyi secured a move to Maltese-based team Gżira United, where he featured for the club mainly during their 2019–20 UEFA Europa League campaign. He made his debut after coming on in the 62nd minute for Ridwaru Adeyemo in the 2–0 loss against Hajduk Split during first leg of the first qualifying round. During the second leg, he was named on the starting line up, played until the 57th minute as they won the match by 3–1 to qualify on away goals to the next round for the first time in the club's history. He featured final 10 minutes in the first leg of the second qualifying round against Latvian side Ventspils which ended in a 4–0 loss to Gżira United but was absent during the second leg which ended in a 2–2 loss and 6–2 loss on aggregate and ended their Europa League journey. He terminated his contract with the club after two months.

=== Senglea Athletic ===
After playing for Gżira United for just two months, Sakyi was signed by fellow Maltese club Senglea Athletic on a one-year deal in August 2019 and was handed the number 6 jersey ahead of the 2019–20 season. On 23 August 2019, he made his debut and played the full 90 minutes in a 1–1 draw against Sirens. He played 14 out of 20 league matches at the end of the season.

=== Maccabi Petah Tikva ===
Sakyi moved to Israeli Premier League side Maccabi Petah Tikva as a free-agent in August 2020 after his contract with Maltese Premier League team Senglea Athletic FC expired. He made his debut on 30 August 2020, in a 2–1 victory over Maccabi Tel Aviv. He ended his first season playing 19 matches in all competitions, starting 16 of those matches.

=== Hapoel Afula F.C. ===
Sakyi moved to Hapoel Afula F.C. for one season.

== International career ==
Sakyi played for the Ghana national under-17 football team at the youth level.
