= Reindorf Huncho =

Ghanaian footballer (born 2006)

Personal information
- Full name: Reindorf Adom Sarbah
- Date of birth: 1 January 2006 (age 20)
- Place of birth: Kasoa, Ghana
- Height: 1.90 m (6 ft 3 in)
- Positions: Centre back; defensive midfielder

Team information
- Current team: Al Ahly
- Number: 50

Youth career
- 2018–2024: Cheetah
- 2024–2025: Al Ahly

Senior career*
Years	Team	Apps	(Gls)
2023–2024	Cheetah	17	(0)
2024–2025	Al Ahly	0	(0)

International career
- Ghana U20
- * Club domestic league appearances and goals as of 28 August 2024

Reindorf Adom Sarbah (born 1 June 2006), commonly known as Reindorf Huncho, is a Ghanaian professional footballer who plays as a centre-back for Egyptian Premier League club Al Ahly.

== Career ==
Reindorf started his professional career in Cheetah.

He spent a trial period with Al Ahly in January 2024, then signed a four and half year contract alongside his citizenship Samuel Oppong on 3 February 2024.

== Style of play ==
Reindorf is a left-footed player. He is 190 cm. He is good at playing mainly as a centre-back, and sometimes as a defensive midfielder.

== Career statistics ==
=== Club ===
As of 16 September 2024

Appearances and goals by club, season and competition
Club	Season	League			Cup		Continental		Other		Total	
Club	Season	Division	Apps	Goals	Apps	Goals	Apps	Goals	Apps	Goals	Apps	Goals
Al Ahly	2023–24	EPL	0	0	0	0	0	0	0	0	0	0
Al Ahly	2024–25	EPL	0	0	0	0	0	0	0	0	0	0
Career total			0	0	0	0	0	0	0	0	0	0

== Honours ==
Al Ahly

- Egyptian Premier League: 2023–24
