= Samuel Oppong (Ghanaian footballer) =

Ghanaian footballer (born 2006)

Personal information
- Full name: Samuel Oppong
- Date of birth: 7 January 2006 (age 20)
- Place of birth: Kumasi, Ghana
- Height: 1.73 m (5 ft 8 in)
- Position: Striker

Team information
- Current team: Al Ahly Youth Team

Youth career
- Ebony FC
- Asokwa Deportivo SC
- EurAfrica FC
- 2022-2023: Empoli FC (loan)
- 2024-: Al Ahly

Senior career*
| Years | Team | Apps | (Gls) |
| 2022-2024 | EurAfrica FC | | |
| 2024- | Al Ahly | | |
| 2024 | → WE SC ( loan ) | 5 | (2) |
- * Club domestic league appearances and goals as of July 1, 2024

Samuel Oppong (born 7 January 2006) is a Ghanaian footballer who plays as a striker for Egyptian Premier League club Al Ahly.

He spent a trial period with Al Ahly in January 2024, then he signed a four and half year contract alongside his citizenship Reindorf Huncho on 3 February 2024.
