= Mohamed Hamdi Messi =

Egyptian footballer (born 2003)

Mohamed Hamdi
Personal information
- Full name: Mohamed Hamdi
- Date of birth: 4 April 2003 (age 23)
- Place of birth: Cairo, Egypt
- Position: Attacking midfielder

Team information
- Current team: Al Ahly

Youth career
- 2010–2016: Al Mokawloon Al Arab
- 2016–2021: Wadi Degla
- 2021–2024: Al Ahly

Senior career*
Years	Team	Apps	(Gls)
2020–2021	Wadi Degla	1	(0)
2022–	Al Ahly	1	(0)
2023	→ Aswan (loan)	0	(0)
2024	→ El Dakhleya (loan)	0	(0)

International career
2020-	Egypt U19	4	(1)
- * Club domestic league appearances and goals

Mohamed Hamdi (Arabic: محمد حمدي; born 4 April 2003), known by his nickname Messi (Arabic: ميسي), is an Egyptian professional footballer who plays as an attacking midfielder for Egyptian Premier League club Al Ahly.
