= Mohamed Abdelsalam =

Mohamed Abdelsalam may refer to:

- Mohamed Abdelsalam (footballer, born 1987), Egyptian footballer
- Mohamed Abdel Salam (footballer, born 1997), Egyptian footballer
