= Anglican Senior High School, Kumasi =

Coordinates: 6.6928°N 1.6085°W

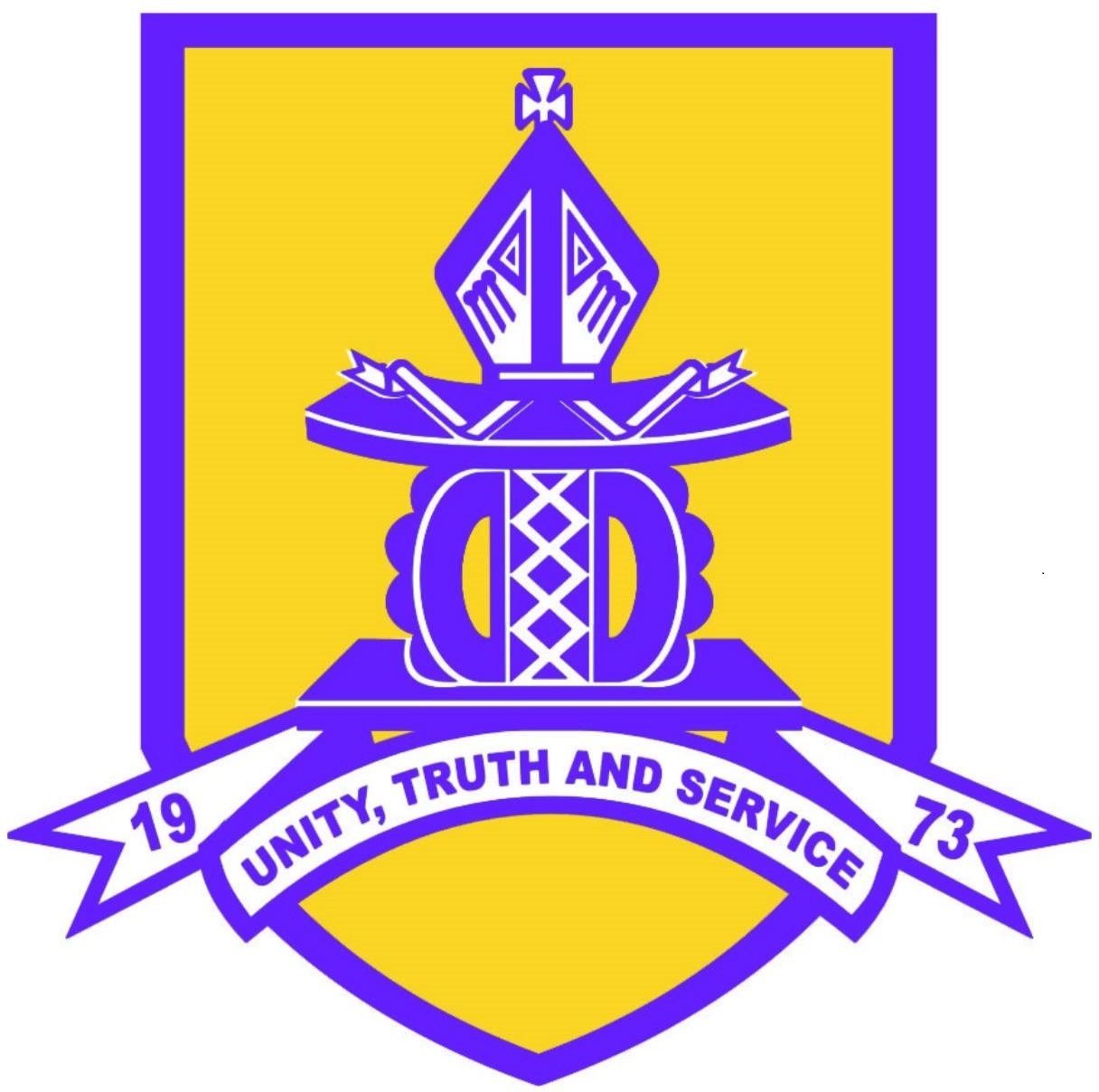
- Ashanti Region; Kumasi; Ghana

Information
- Other name: KASS
- Type: Public senior secondary
- Motto: Unity, Truth and Service
- Denomination: Anglican Church
- Established: 1973 (53 years ago)
- School district: Kumasi Metropolitan
- Chairman of Governors: Mr. D. M. Adusei
- Headmistress: Mrs. REBECCA TETTEH
- Staff: 120
- Colors: Gold, purple and white
- Song: We will unite and work
- Alumni: Disciples

The Anglican Senior High School, Kumasi, is a co-educational public high school situated in Asem, a suburb of Kumasi in the Ashanti Region of Ghana. Founded in 1965, the present headmistress is Ms. Rebecca Tetteh.

== Crest ==
The school's crest is composed of four elements: a golden shield with purple outline; a purple and white bishop's mitre; a purple Akan male stool; and a white scroll bearing the motto of the school, "Unity, truth and service". The shield refers to the "shield of faith" in Ephesians 6:16. The shield is also a symbol of defence and security. The indigenous Akan male stool in the centre of the insignia represents the contribution of traditional authorities towards the establishment and growth of the school. These contributions include the provision of land, guidance, and encouragement. The Anglican bishop's mitre symbolizes the school's religious affiliation with the Anglican Church. The mitre sitting on the stool also represents peace, harmony, and unity between the Church and the society through education. The white scroll located on the lower half of the crest bears the school's motto: "Unity, Truth and Service". Three colours are found in the school's crest: gold symbolizes honour and loyalty; purple symbolizes priesthood and kingship; white symbolizes purity and virtue.

== History ==
In the early 1920s, the KASS site was acquired from the Amakom chief by the English Church Mission (E.C.M.) with the intention of establishing an institution to train clergy, and facilitate the growth of the church in the Gold Coast.

Bishop M. S. O'Rocke (1913–23) secured the services of the monks of the Benedictine Order (O.S.B.) from Nashdom Abbey, England, to run the newly founded institution. In 1952, St. Augustine's Theological College was established.

In 1965, the Anglican Training College (Anglico), the fore-runner institution of KASS, was established at the same site KASS is currently located. However, in 1972 when the second Republic (under Prime Minister Dr. K. A. Busia) was overthrown by Colonel I. K. Acheampong, the new government decided that numerous training colleges would be converted into secondary schools or closed. Anglican Training College was listed as one of those to close. The staff, supported by their principal Rev. Fr Aggrey, signed a petition asking the government not to close the college, but to convert it into a secondary school to be called Anglican Secondary School, Kumasi. The petition which was sent via the bishop, Rt. Rev. J. B. Arthur, who in turn wrote a covering letter approving of the petition. Both letters were forwarded to the then secretary of Education, Colonel Nkegbe in Accra. The petition was granted and in September 1973 Anglican Training College became Anglican Secondary School. It was a co-educational school but in 1987 stopped accepting girls as boarders. Rev. Fr. P.D. Aggrey, Principal of the training college was retained as Headmaster of the secondary school. He administered the school from 1973 to 1981 when he retired and was succeeded by Mr. John Poku between 1981 and 1987. During the third term of the 1986/87 academic year, Mr. A. E. Kyere (a.k.a. Kontonkyi) assumed duty as the third Headmaster of the school. It was under him that the school improved academically. In 1999, the school was for the first time, invited to take part in the National Science and Maths Quiz Competitions. Rev'd Canon E.Y. Brobe-Mensah, assumed headship of the school in November 2003, remaining in post until 2010.

== Headmasters and Headmistress ==
Ordinal	Officeholder	Term start	Term end	Time in office	Notes
1	Rev'd Philip Dawson Aggrey	1965	1973	8 years	
2	John Poku	1973	1981	8 years	
3	Andrews Evans Kyere	1986	2003	22 years	
4	Rev'd Canon Emmanuel Yaw Brobe-Mensah	2003	2010	7 years	
5	Alex Conduah	2010	2017	7 years	
6	Rev. Canon Sencherey	2017	2024	7 years	
7	Mrs. Rebecca Tetteh	2025	Present	233 days (as of January 25, 2025)	

== Campus ==
There are seven houses on campus;

Aglionby	Quaque
A.E. Kyere, also known as Kontonkyi	Roseveare
Prempeh	Brobbe-Mensah	Conduah

The school also has an assembly hall, five classroom blocks, science laboratories, ICT laboratories, an art studio and a library. The campus includes a basketball court and a football field.

== Curriculum ==
The school provides a broad curriculum, including English, mathematics and sciences (either as integrated science or as separate disciplines of biology, chemistry and physics). In addition, the general arts curriculum offers courses in Christian religious studies, economics, English literature, geography, government, history and music. Language teaching includes French and Twi (Asante). Other curriculum areas include art, business, home economics and ICT.

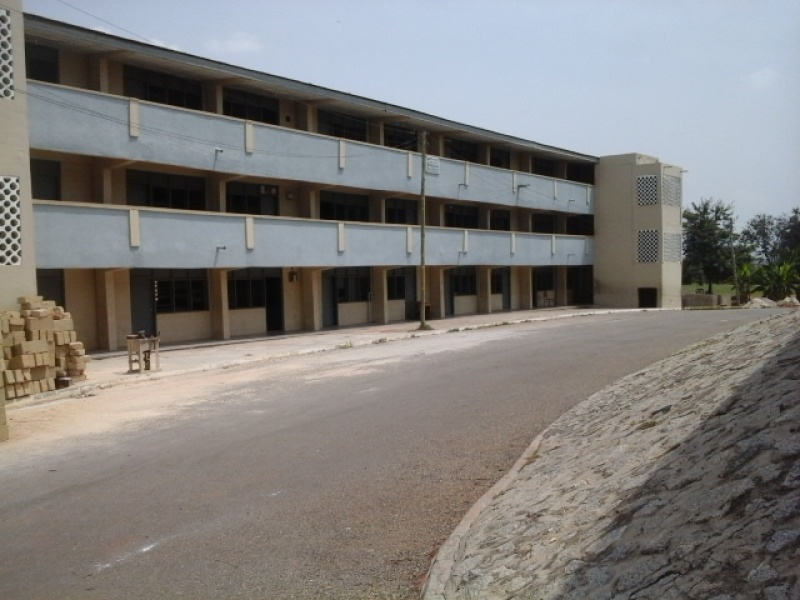
Science block

== Extracurricular activities ==
In 1999, the school began entering teams in the Ghana National Science and Maths Quiz, with varying degrees of success. In their first competition, the school was knocked out in the first round by eventual runners up Wesley Girls' High School, but in 2007 KASS reached the final.

== Notable alumni ==
- Lord Kenya – musician
- Dominic Adiyiah – footballer
- Amos Frimpong – Kotoko Captain
- Elvis Sakyi – Ghanaian footballer
- Kwabena Mintah Akandoh – Member of Parliament

== See also ==
- Education in Ghana
- List of senior high schools in Ashanti Region
