= Cheetah F.C. =

Football team in Ghana

- Full name: Cheetah Football Club
- Founded: 2009; 17 years ago
- Ground: Yartel Okoso park (Predators Den)
- Owner: Abdul-Hayye Yartey
- League: Division Two League, Ghana

Cheetah Football Club is a Ghanaian football club based in Kasoa in the Central Region of Ghana. The club currently competes in Central Region Zone of the Division Two League which is the third tier of the football league system in Ghana, and the MTN FA Cup.

== History ==
In 2009, Abdul-Hayye Yartey, a Ghanaian sports executive and entrepreneur founded the club in Kasoa as a juvenile club. The club started scouting young prospects across Ghana and recruiting them to form a football club.

In 2021, the club was named on the top 10 clubs in Africa with the most outgoing transfers of players in FIFA's 2020 Global Transfer Market Report.

As of 2021, the team plays in the Central Regional Football Association (CRFA) Division Two League.

Some of the club's most notable players are Christian Atsu, Emmanuel Toku and Alhassan Wakaso amongst others.

== Grounds ==
In August 2020, the club began the construction of an AstroTurf for the use of the club. In June 2021 the club inaugurated as AstroTurf pitch which is reportedly the biggest in Ghana, called the Yartel Okoso park (The Predators Den) in Senya Beraku. From the inception of the club in 2009 till 2020, the club used the Kasoa pitch as their home venue.

== Management ==
Position	Name
Chairman & President	Abdul-Hayye Yartey

== Notable players ==
Main: Category:Cheetah F.C. players

- Christian Atsu (1992–2023), Ghanaian footballer
- Elvis Sakyi (born 1996), Ghanaian footballer
- Kwasi Sibo (born 1998), Ghanaian footballer
- Emmanuel Toku (born 2000), Ghanaian footballer
- Reindorf Huncho (born 2006), Ghanaian footballer
