= Karim Fouad =

Egyptian footballer (born 1999)

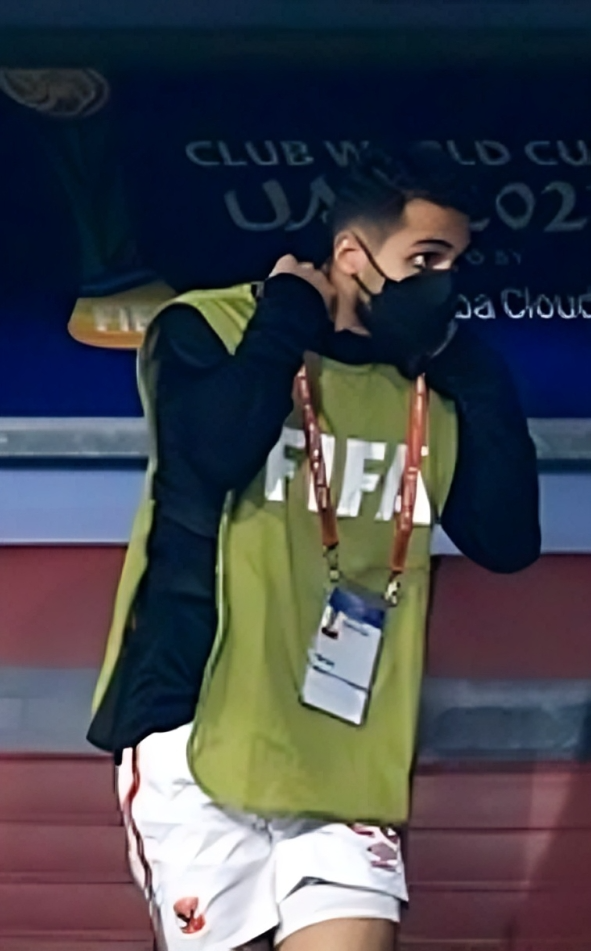
- Fouad With Al Ahly in 2021 FIFA Club World Cup

Personal information
- Full name: Karim Fouad Abdel Hamid Mahmoud
- Date of birth: 1 October 1999 (age 27)
- Height: 1.74 m (5 ft 9 in)
- Position: Right-back

Team information
- Current team: Al Ahly
- Number: 28

Youth career
- 2017–2018: Nogoom

Senior career*
Years	Team	Apps	(Gls)
2018–2021	Nogoom	12	(0)
2019–2021	→ ENPPI (loan)	53	(0)
2021–	Al Ahly	41	(4)

International career
2019-2021	Egypt U23		
2021–	Egypt	2	(0)
- * Club domestic league appearances and goals

Karim Fouad Abdel Hamid Mahmoud (born 1 October 1999) is an Egyptian football player who plays as a defender for Egyptian Premier League club Al Ahly and the Egypt national team.

== Career statistics ==
=== Club ===
As of match played 12 March 2024

Appearances and goals by club, season and competition
Club	Season	League			National cup (Note: Includes Egypt Cup, Egyptian League Cup)		Continental		Other		Total	
Club	Season	Division	Apps	Goals	Apps	Goals	Apps	Goals	Apps	Goals	Apps	Goals
Nogoom	2018-19	Egyptian Premier League	12	0	—		—		—		12	0
ENPPI (loan)	2019-20	Egyptian Premier League	26	0	1	0	—		—		27	0
ENPPI (loan)	2020-21	Egyptian Premier League	26	0	1	0	—		—		27	0
ENPPI (loan)	Total		52	0	2	0	0	0	0	0	54	0
Al Ahly	2020-21	Egyptian Premier League	0	0	1	0	—		—		1	0
Al Ahly	2021-22	Egyptian Premier League	22	0	5	1	3 (Note: Appearance(s) in CAF Champions League)	0	3 (Note: One appearance and one goal in Egyptian Super Cup & two appearances in FIFA Club World Cup)	1	33	2
Al Ahly	2022-23	Egyptian Premier League	12	2	—		—		—		12	2
Al Ahly	2023-24	Egyptian Premier League	7	2	—		6	0	5 (Note: Two appearances and one goal in Egyptian Super Cup & three appearances in FIFA Club World Cup)	1	18	3

=== International ===
As of match played 27 September 2022

National team	Year	Apps	Goals
Egypt U-23	2020	2	0
Egypt U-23	2021	3 (Note: Two appearances in the Olympic Games)	0
Egypt	2022	1	0
Total		6	0

== Honours and achievements ==
Al Ahly

- Egyptian Premier League: 2022–23
- CAF Super Cup: 2021 (December)
- FIFA Club World Cup: Third-Place 2021, 2023
- Egyptian Super Cup: 2021–22, 2023–24, 2024
- Egypt Cup: 2021–22, 2022–23
- CAF Champions League: 2022–23, 2023-24
- FIFA African–Asian–Pacific Cup: 2024
