= Mohamed Abdel Salam (footballer, born 1997) =

Egyptian footballer (born 1997)

Personal information
- Full name: Mohamed Abdel Salam Mohamed Abdel Hamid
- Date of birth: 1 October 1997 (age 29)
- Place of birth: Cairo, Egypt
- Height: 1.87 m (6 ft 2 in)
- Position: Centre-back

Youth career
- Wadi Degla

Senior career*
Years	Team	Apps	(Gls)
2016–2018	Petrojet	9	(2)
2018–2023	Zamalek	22	(0)

International career^{‡}
2017	Egypt U20	3	(0)
2019–2021	Egypt U23	5	(0)
- * Club domestic league appearances and goals as of 6 February 2023 ‡ National team caps and goals as of 6 February 2020

Mohamed Abdel Salam Mohamed Abdel Hamid (Arabic: مُحَمَّد عَبْد السَّلَام مُحَمَّد عَبْد الْحَمِيد; born 1 October 1997) is an Egyptian footballer who plays as a centre-back.

He competed at the 2020 Summer Olympics.

== Honours ==
Zamalek

- Egyptian Premier League 2020–21
- Saudi-Egyptian Super Cup: 2018
- CAF Confederation Cup: 2018–19
- Egypt Cup: 2018–19
- Egyptian Super Cup: 2019–20
- CAF Super Cup: 2020

Egypt U23

- Africa U-23 Cup of Nations: 2019
