= Mohamed Abdelsalam (footballer, born 1987) =

Egyptian footballer (born 1987)

Personal information
- Date of birth: 24 May 1987 (age 39)
- Position: Left midfielder

Team information
- Current team: Al Nasr

Youth career
- Al Ahly

Senior career*
Years	Team	Apps	(Gls)
2007–2010	Haras El Hodoud		
2010–2013	Al Nasr		
2013–2015	Petrojet		
2015–2016	Ittihad El Shorta		
2016–2017	Pharco		
2017–	Al Nasr		
- * Club domestic league appearances and goals as of 14 September 2017

Mohamed Abdelsalam (Arabic: محمد عبد السلام; born 24 May 1987) is an Egyptian professional footballer who plays as a left midfielder for the Egyptian club Al Nasr. He started his career in youth level in El Sharkia, and moved to Al Ahly in the same level when he was 10. He then moved to Haras El Hodoud where he won two Egypt Cups, one of which was against Al Ahly, and an Egyptian Super Cup against Al Ahly too.

Abdelsalam got injured and suffered from a dislocated ankle and a broken fibula during his match with Petrojet against Masry in 2014–15 Egyptian Premier League. Following this injury, Petrojet terminated the contract and refused to continue the healing of the player, Ettihad El Shorta though decided to sign the player for three years in addition to healing him by their side.
