= Ahmed Atef (footballer, born 1998) =

Egyptian footballer

Personal information
- Full name: Ahmed Atef Mouhran Mohamed
- Date of birth: 21 March 1998 (age 28)
- Place of birth: Sohag, Egypt
- Position: Forward

Team information
- Current team: Modern Sport
- Number: 30

Youth career
- Al-Saha
- Wadi Degla

Senior career*
Years	Team	Apps	(Gls)
2020–2022	Wadi Degla	18	(6)
2020	→ Ergotelis (loan)	5	(0)
2021–2022	→ Future (loan)	25	(9)
2022–24	Modern Sport	48	(10)
2023-	ZED FC	48	(9)

International career
2022–	Egypt	3	(0)
- * Club domestic league appearances and goals as of 23:14, 6 September 2024 (UTC)

Ahmed Atef Mouhran Mohamed (Arabic: أَحْمَد عَاطِف مِهْرَان مُحَمَّد; born 21 March 1998) is an Egyptian professional footballer who plays as a forward for Modern Sport.

== Club career ==
Born in the Sohag Governorate, Atef began his career with local fourth division club Al-Saha before joining the academy of professional side Wadi Degla. In 2020, having been linked with a move to Wadi Degla's sister club in Belgium, Lierse, he instead joined one of the club's other sister clubs, Greek side Ergotelis. However, after just five appearances for the club, he returned to Egypt due to the COVID-19 pandemic.

The following season he made his debut for Wadi Degla in the Egyptian Premier League, and his performances drew the attention of top Egyptian clubs Al Ahly and Zamalek, with both clubs reportedly making formal offers. Despite these links, Atef instead joined newly promoted side Future on a one-year loan deal in September 2021.

His career with Future got off to a good start, and he was commended in Egyptian media for a performance against Al Ahly, helping his team to a draw. Later in the season, it was revealed that Future had a clause in the loan deal to buy Atef, despite the interest of other clubs.

In March 2022, it was reported that Future had excised their purchase option for a reported fee between 12 and 18 million Egyptian pounds. However, in May of the same year, Atef requested permission to join Al Ahly in the summer transfer window. On 25 May 2022, Future confirmed that they had purchased Atef from Wadi Degla. In August 2022, he was again linked with a move away from the club, this time to Swiss side Basel.

With his contract set to expire in January 2025, Future - now known as Modern Sport - rejected three offers from foreign clubs to sign Atef in the Summer 2024 transfer window.

== International career ==
Atef reportedly caught the eye of then-national team manager Carlos Queiroz in March 2022 following his performances with Future. He earned his first call up in June of the same year, and made his debut in a 2–0 win against Ethiopia in 2023 Africa Cup of Nations qualification.

== Career statistics ==
=== Club ===
As of 6 September 2024.

Appearances and goals by club, season and competition
Club	Season	League			National Cup		League Cup		Continental		Other		Total	
Club	Season	Division	Apps	Goals	Apps	Goals	Apps	Goals	Apps	Goals	Apps	Goals	Apps	Goals
Wadi Degla	2019–20	Egyptian Premier League	0	0	0	0	0	0	0	0	0	0	0	0
Wadi Degla	2020–21	Egyptian Premier League	18	6	2 (Note: Appearances in the Egypt Cup)	0	0	0	0	0	0	0	20	6
Wadi Degla	2021–22	Egyptian Second Division	0	0	0	0	0	0	–		0	0	0	0
Wadi Degla	Total		18	6	2	0	0	0	0	0	0	0	20	6
Ergotelis (loan)	2019–20	Super League Greece 2	5	0	0	0	–		–		0	0	5	0
Future (loan)	2021–22	Egyptian Premier League	25	9	0	0	2 (Note: Appearances in the Egyptian League Cup)	1	0	0	0	0	27	10
Modern Sport	2022–23	Egyptian Premier League	19	4	1	0	0	0	8 (Note: Appearances in the CAF Confederation Cup)	2	0	0	28	6
Modern Sport	2023–24	Egyptian Premier League	29	6	1	0	2	0	9	3	2 (Note: Appearances in the Egyptian Super Cup)	0	43	9
Modern Sport	Total		73	19	2	0	4	1	17	5	2	0	98	25
Career total			5	0	0	0	0	0	0	0	0	0	5	0

=== International ===
As of 6 September 2024

National team	Year	Apps	Goals
Egypt	2022	2	0
Egypt	2024	1	0
Total		3	0
