= Babatunde Bello =

Nigerian footballer

Personal information
- Full name: Bello Babatunde Martins
- Date of birth: 11 May 2003 (age 23)
- Place of birth: Ido Ekiti, Nigeria
- Height: 1.70 m (5 ft 7 in)
- Position: Defensive midfielder

Team information
- Current team: Akwa United
- Number: 35

Youth career
- –2020: Akwa United

Senior career*
| Years | Team | Apps | (Gls) |
| 2020–2022 | Sunshine Stars | 26 | (3) |
| 2022 | Akwa United | 16 | (4) |
| 2022– | Future FC | 1 | (0) |

International career^{‡}
| 2022– | Nigeria | 0 | (0) |
- * Club domestic league appearances and goals as of 6 June 2022 ‡ National team caps and goals as of 6 June 2022

Bello Babatunde Martins (born 11 May 2003) is a Nigerian professional footballer who plays for Future FC in the Egyptian Premier League.

== Club career ==
Bello made his professional debut for Sunshine Stars on the 13 June 2021, starting the NPFL game against Enugu Rangers.

Midway through the following season, he switched to Akwa United, the Nigerian League reining champions, where he quickly became one of the most prominent players.

Attracting the attention of clubs between Sweden and Egypt with his NPFL form, he eventually signed for Egyptian Premier League side Future FC, in Octobre 2022.

== International career ==
Babatunde Bello was first called to the Nigeria national football team in May 2022 for the friendly matches against Mexico and Ecuador.
