= Jonathan Ngwem =

Cameroonian international footballer

Personal information
- Full name: Jonathan Joseph Ngwem
- Date of birth: 20 July 1991 (age 35)
- Place of birth: Douala, Cameroon
- Height: 1.78 m (5 ft 10 in)
- Position: Left-back

Senior career*
Years	Team	Apps	(Gls)
2011–2012	Pouma		
2013–2014	Jeunesse Bonamoussadi		
2015–2016	Unisport		
2016–2017	Progresso do Sambizanga	6	(1)
2018	Unisport		
2018–2021	El Gouna	82	(1)
2021–2025	Future FC	96	(10)

International career^{‡}
2015–2021	Cameroon	10	(0)
Medal record
Men's football
Representing Cameroon
Africa Cup of Nations
Winner	2017 Gabon
- * Club domestic league appearances and goals as of 09:18, 23 March 2026 (UTC) ‡ National team caps and goals as of 09:18, 23 March 2026 (UTC)

Jonathan Joseph Ngwem (born 20 July 1991) is a Cameroonian international footballer who plays as a left-back.

== Career ==
Born in Douala, Ngwem has played for Pouma, Jeunesse Bonamoussadi, Unisport, Progresso do Sambizanga, El Gouna and Future FC.

He made his international debut in 2015, and was named in the squad for the 2017 Africa Cup of Nations.

== Honours ==
Cameroon

- Africa Cup of Nations: 2017
