= Mohamed Mahmoud (footballer, born 1998) =

Egyptian footballer (born 1998)

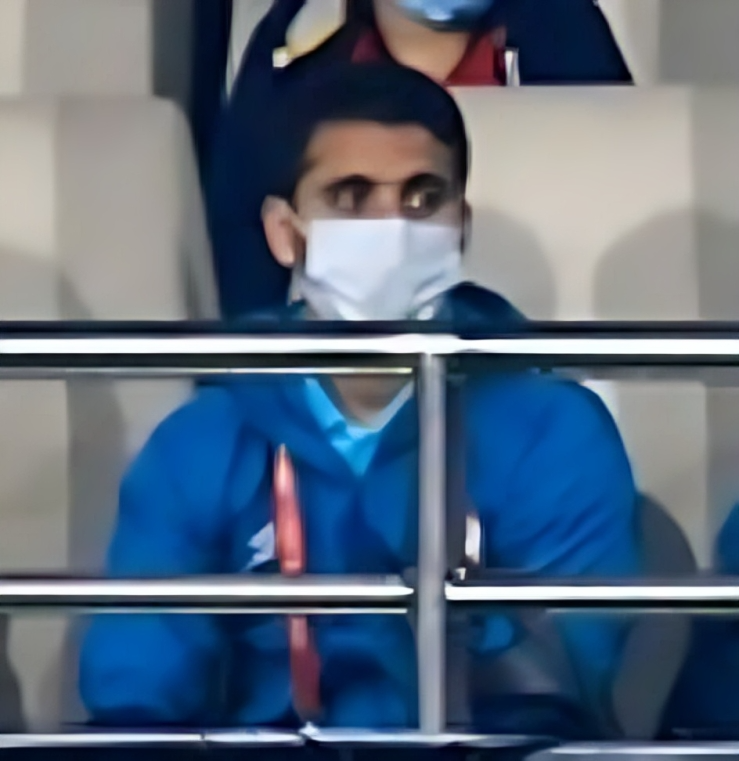
- Mahmoud With Al Ahly in 2021 FIFA Club World Cup

Personal information
- Full name: Mohamed Mahmoud Ali Ahmed
- Date of birth: 7 May 1998 (age 28)
- Place of birth: Egypt
- Height: 1.65 m (5 ft 5 in)
- Position: Midfielder

Team information
- Current team: El Gouna FC

Youth career
- Wadi Degla

Senior career*
Years	Team	Apps	(Gls)
2016–2019	Wadi Degla	26	(3)
2019–2023	Al Ahly	13	(1)
2023–2023	→ Al Ittihad Alexandria (loan)	20	(0)
2023–24	Future	12	(0)
2024-	El Gouna FC	12	(0)

International career
2018–	Egypt	2	(0)
- * Club domestic league appearances and goals

Mohamed Mahmoud Ali Ahmed (Arabic: محمد محمود علي أحمد; born 7 May 1998), is an Egyptian footballer who plays as a midfielder for the Egyptian Premier League side Future and the Egyptian national team.

== Honours ==
Al Ahly

- Egyptian Premier League: 2018–19، 2019–20
- Egypt Cup: 2018–19، 2021–22
- Egyptian Super Cup: 2018, 2019, 2022
- CAF Champions League: 2019–20, 2020–21
- CAF Super Cup: 2021 (May), 2021 (Dec)
