= Ali El Fil =

Egyptian footballer (born 1990)

Ali Elfil
Personal information
- Full name: Ali Ahmed Mohab Elfil
- Date of birth: November 11, 1990 (age 35)
- Place of birth: Egypt
- Position: Defender

Team information
- Current team: Canal SC

Senior career*
Years	Team	Apps	(Gls)
2013	Telephonat Beni Suef SC	14	
2015-2018	Haras El Hodoud SC	91	(2)
2019-23	Tala'ea El Gaish SC	68	(2)
2023-2026	Modern Sport FC	87	(3)
2026-	Canal SC	0	(0)
- * Club domestic league appearances and goals

Ali Ahmed Mohab Elfil (Arabic: عَلِيّ أَحْمَد مُهَاب الْفِيل; born 11 November 1990) is an Egyptian footballer who plays for the Egyptian Premier League side Canal SC as a defender.

== Biography ==
Ali Elfil was born on December 13, 1992, in Egypt. He started his football career at Telephonat Beni Suef SC. In 2015, he was transferred to Haras El Hodoud SC. In 2018, he was bought by Tala'ea El Gaish SC and in 2022 he was transferred to Future FC. In totality, he has over one hundred appearances and three goals.

== Trophies ==
- EFA League Cup: 2022 with (Future FC)
- Egyptian Super Cup: 2020-21 with (Talaea El Geish)
