= Emam Ashour =

Egyptian footballer (born 1998)

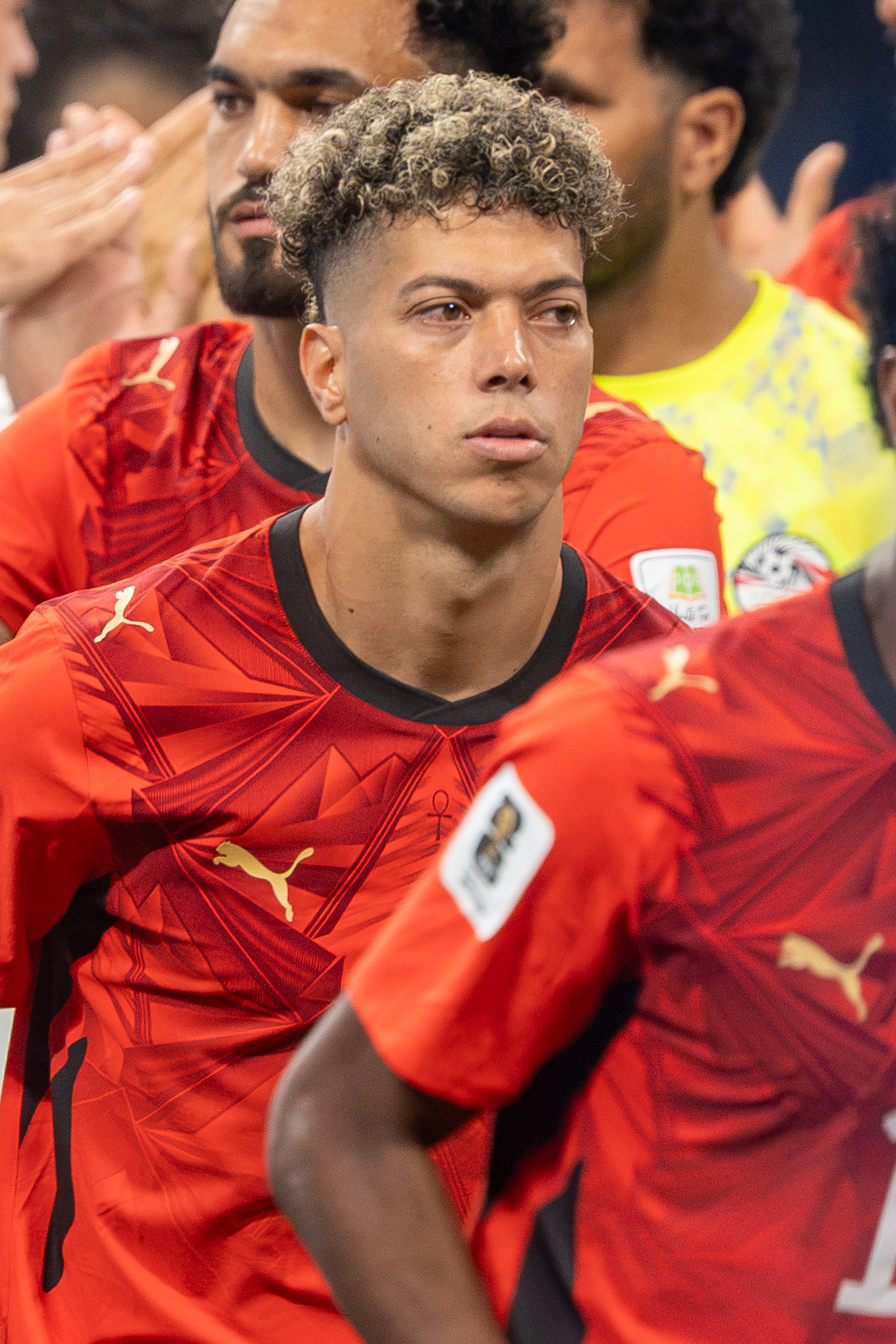
- Ashour with Egypt in 2026

Personal information
- Full name: Emam Ashour Metwally Abdel Ghany
- Date of birth: 20 February 1998 (age 28)
- Place of birth: El Senbellawein, Dakahlia, Egypt
- Height: 1.80 m (5 ft 11 in)
- Positions: Midfielder; winger; second striker

Team information
- Current team: Al Ahly
- Number: 22

Youth career
- 2009–2015: Ghazl El Mahalla

Senior career*
Years	Team	Apps	(Gls)
2015–2019	Ghazl El Mahalla	?	(?)
2018–2019	→ Haras El Hodoud (loan)	31	(4)
2019–2023	Zamalek	77	(13)
2023	Midtjylland	5	(1)
2023–	Al Ahly	66	(23)

International career^{‡}
2019–2021	Egypt U23	11	(0)
2021–	Egypt	34	(2)
Medal record
Men's football
Representing Egypt
Africa Cup of Nations
Runner-up	2021 Cameroon
Africa U-23 Cup of Nations
Winner	Egypt 2019	Egypt U23
- * Club domestic league appearances and goals as of 9 November 2026 ‡ National team caps and goals as of 7 July 2026

Emam Ashour Metwally Abdel Ghany (Note: Arabic: إمام عاشور متولي عبد الغني) (born 20 February 1998) is an Egyptian professional footballer who plays as a midfielder, winger or second striker for Egyptian Premier League club Al Ahly and the Egypt national team. He has also occasionally been deployed as a right-back. Capable of contributing on both halves of the field, Ashour has been described as a "Swiss Army Knife", and "the Egyptian Figo". Despite his talent, Ashour has been criticised for his disciplinary issues and has been labelled a "flawed genius".

Ashour came up through El Mahalla, where he played until 2018. After a season-long loan to Haras El Hodoud, he transferred to Zamalek, where he won the Egyptian Premier League in 2020–21 and 2021–22, the Egypt Cup in 2018–19 and 2020–21, and the Egyptian Super Cup in 2018–19. Ashour briefly transferred to Danish side Midtjylland in the 2022–23 season, before moving to Al Ahly, where he immediately won the Egypt Cup. In the 2023–24 season, he won the Premier League again, alongside the Egyptian Super Cup and the CAF Champions League. He was also named to the 2023–24 Egyptian Premier League Team of the Season. The following season, he also won the Premier League, emerging as the club's talisman. He finished as the league's top goalscorer and was named the league's best player. This was accompanied by another Egyptian Super Cup and the FIFA African–Asian–Pacific Cup. In his second season successively, he was part of the 2024–25 Egyptian Premier League Team of the Season.

As a youth international for Egypt, Ashour won the 2019 U-23 Africa Cup of Nations. He was called up to participate in the 2020 Olympics games. Since then, he has represented the senior Egypt side in the Africa Cup of Nations in 2021, 2023 and 2025. Ashour was a focal player in Egypt's 2026 World Cup campaign, in which they reached the round of 16 – the nation's best-ever World Cup finish.

== Early and personal life ==
In July 2026, live with Mona el-Shazly, Ashour recounted how his mother had to throw him off a bus to save his life after a fire broke out inside the vehicle.

Ashour is married to Yasmine Hafez. The couple have one daughter.

== Club career ==
=== Ghazl El Mahlla ===
Ashour began his career in the youth sector of Ghazl El Mahalla and progressed through all of the club's youth teams. He was promoted to the first team for El Mahalla and then moved to Haras El Hodoud on loan for a season. In the 2017–18 season – his last season for Ghazl El Mahalla – he made the most appearances for the first team.

==== 2018–19: Loan to Haras El Hodoud ====
On 22 July 2018, according to Youm7, Ashour signed for Haras El Hodoud on a three-year deal. However, FilGoal, and another report from Youm7, wrote that the transfer was intended to be a two-season loan. Ghazl El Mahalla disclosed that the deal involved a clause necessitating that Haras host the Ghazl El Mahalla team at a hotel in Alexandria during four of their Second Division league matches in the 2018–19 season. Ashour made his debut on 1 August in a 2–1 league defeat to El Entag El Harby in the league, playing for 62 minutes and receiving a yellow card in the 12th minute. On 14 October, Hisham Mohaisen of Al-Masry Al-Youm reported that Ashour was a target for Al Masry SC, acting upon the request of head coach Hossam Hassan. On 19 October, Ashour scored the equaliser for Haras in a 1–1 draw against Smouha. On 26 November, Ashour scored the third goal for Haras in the 88th minute of a 4–1 win over Wadi Degla, in the sixteenth round match of the league competition. On 12 August 2023, Mohamed Fadl, Al Ahly's former Director of Transfers, revealed that Ashour had almost signed with the club in 2018, saying: "The opportunity arose while he was on loan at Haras El Hodoud from Ghazl El Mahalla, but the deal did not go through because of those who succeeded us; ultimately, every coach has their own perspective on players."

On 14 January 2019, Ashour scored the deciding goal in the 94th minute of a 0–1 win against El Dakhleya. On 21 May, Ashour scored another goal against Wadi Degla – an equaliser in the 81st minute – helping Haras to a 1–1 draw. Amidst his 2018–19 campaign, Ashour scored four goals and made one assist in 32 games. On 2 August 2019, Haras' head coach Tarek El Ashry stated that Ashour had left the Haras training camp for Zamalek, and had signed a five-season contract with the Cairene team. He noted that Zamalek had offered Haras players to secure Ashour, and added: "Emam Ashour is a very talented player and a valuable addition to Zamalek, especially given his young age and promising future."

=== Zamalek ===
==== 2019–20: Egypt Cup and Egyptian Super Cup ====
On 4 August 2019, Zamalek announced the signing of Ashour on a 5-season contract for a reported EGP 11 million. Ashour himself was due to pay EGP 2 million to activate his release clause. However, Hossam Ezzo, Ghazl El Mahalla's chairman, later said that Ashour "only paid EGP 500,000 and there is EGP 1,500,000 left. When we asked him to pay us in three separate checks, he hasn’t done it and has been avoiding our calls." Ezzo added El Mahalla had received a verdict to imprison Ashour. On 28 August, Ashour made his debut for Zamalek, playing for 33 minutes in a 1–0 win against Misr Lel Makkasa in the quarter-finals of the Egypt Cup. On 8 September, Ashour won the 2019 Egypt Cup final 3–0 against Pyramids, coming off the bench in the 72nd minute. On 20 September, Ashour's Zamalek lost 3–2 to Al Ahly in the 2019 Egyptian Super Cup final. On 23 September, Ashour played his first league match for Zamalek, starting in a 1–0 win over Al Ittihad. He played his second league match on 3 October in a 0–1 win over Misr Lel Makkasa; Ashour appeared visibly angry as he was substituted off in the 37th minute. He reacted heatedly towards assistant coach Ayman Abdel-Aziz, who had urged him to leave the pitch quickly, and his teammates attempted to calm him down. On 3 January 2020, a club source reportedly claimed that Ashour had been excluded from the squad, since manager Patrice Carteron preferred Zizo and Mohamed Ounajem. On 20 February, Ashour won the 2020 Egyptian Super Cup final as an unused substitute. After the match, cameras recorded Ashour assaulting Walid Soliman, an Al Ahly player. Consequently, the Disciplinary and Ethics Committee of the Egyptian Football Association decided to suspend Ashour until the end of the season and fine each those involved 100,000 Egyptian pounds (approximately €5,000). Following appeals, the exclusion was ultimately reduced to a ten-match ban.

On 22 September 2020, Ashour scored the third goal for Zamalek against Tanta in the 96th minute of a league match; it ended with a score of 3–1 in favour of Zamalek. On 5 October 2020, Ashour scored the equaliser in the 81st minute of Zamalek's round of 16 match in the Egypt Cup against Smouha, helping his team to a 2–1 win. Ali Ismail of KingFut labelled him "the main protagonist in helping Zamalek reaching the quarter-finals of the Egypt Cup". On 1 October, Zamalek secured a 1–0 league victory against Al Masry and Ashour played a prominent role in a brawl between the players from both sides. On 6 October 2020, the Disciplinary and Ethics Committee of the Egyptian Football Association announced that Ashour was suspended for one match and fined 50,000 pounds.

==== 2020–21: First league title ====
On 9 January 2021, Ashour scored a brace in Zamalek's 3–0 league win over Talaea El Gaish. Ahmed El-Ramady of KingFut wrote that his first goal was "a rocket from long range", whilst his second came from "a sublime combination play with Ahmed Sayed Zizo". On 12 January, Ashour scored again, netting Zamalek's only goal in a 1–0 victory against Al Masry; with "an unstoppable shot from outside the penalty area that found the top right corner." The win moved Zamalek to the top of the league. Ashour recorded 3 assists in five games between 19 January and 7 February, making these contributions against El Gouna on 19 January, Ghazl El Mahalla on 2 February, and Al-Ittihad Alexandria on 7 February. Ashour scored in a 2–0 league win over Ceramica Cleopatra on 11 March.

On 3 April 2021, Ashour was an unused substitute as Zamalek won 2–0 against MC Alger. Ashour reportedly refused to warm up during the second half, and insulted head coach Patrice Carteron; he was then suspended and temporarily demoted to the U-23 side. On 12 April, after an Egyptian Premier League Youth game in which Zamalek lost away to Al Ahly 2–1, Ashour was filmed leading offensive chants against Al Ahly during the post-match celebrations alongside teammate Ahmed Eid, directed towards Al Ahly's board members, fans, and former president Hassan Hamdy. Al Ahly submitted an official complaint against him; in a statement, the club said: "the player, Ashour, got used to performing such intolerable actions as he previously assaulted Walid Soliman, Al Ahly’s player, during the 2020 Egyptian Super Cup final in the UAE while Soliman was down on the pitch. ... the player is known for his unacceptable behaviour, and the previous penalties didn’t stop him from performing such actions." Former Al Ahly centre-back Wael Gomaa labelled Ashour "still a nobody in the Egyptian footballing scene", and added: "Unfortunately, some people are defending this stupid behaviour from a player who didn’t accomplish anything in Egyptian football". Ashour was ultimately punished with a 12-game suspension, which Zamalek appealed. The Egyptian Football Association allowed him to play the title decider in the U-19 youth league between Zamalek and Al Ahly, scheduled for 26 May, but the match was later postponed. Ashour was included in Zamalek's travelling squad for their match against Al Masry on 24 May, which he was not eligible to play, for the purpose of joining the team at their closed training camp before his imminent return. He returned on 30 May in a goalless draw to El Gouna. On 14 August 2021, Ashour opened the scoring in a 2–0 win against Ismaily; his powerful shot deflected off Ismaily defender Marouane Sahraoui into the goal. On 24 August, Zamalek won the league title with a 2–0 win over Entag El Harby.

==== 2021–22: Domestic double ====
On 7 March 2022, Ashour scored and assisted in a 2–1 league win over Gouna; he scored from the edge of the box in the 16th minute, and assisted Zizo with a long ball two minutes later. He repeated the feat the next league match, scoring and assisting again in a 2–3 win against Pyramids on 6 April. He scored in a third successive league match, netting the sole goal against Makkasa with a long-range shot, on 9 April. On 10 May, Ashour missed a league fixture against ENPPI due to his accumulation of yellow cards.

On 28 June 2022, Ashour scored in a 3–2 win over Ceramica Cleopatra. On 21 July, Emam Ashour scored the winner against Al Ahly in the final of the 2021 Egypt Cup; he "exchanged passes with [Ahmed] El-Sayed on the edge of the area and then curled a low shot into the far corner". Ashour missed Zamalek's league match against Smouha on 24 July owing to suspension, having previously picked up three yellow cards in three successive games. On 5 August, Ashour scored in a 1–4 win over Gouna. He received two yellow cards in the same game and was sent off, prompting a one-match suspension. On 23 August, title rivals Pyramids lost 1–0 to Modern Future, handing Zamalek the league title.

==== 2022–23: 100th appearance and departure ====
On 1 December 2022, Ashour scored in a 2–2 league draw against Al Masry, opening the scoring in the 20th minute. Ashour scored again in his next match, a 0–4 rout of Tala'ea El Gaish, on 7 December. This streak meant that Ashour had scored in two consecutive league matches for the third season in a row since joining Zamalek. He also assisted in the match; Ahmed Fatouh scored Zamalek's third goal "following a brilliant combination play with Emam Ashour." Ashour made two more assists on 20 and 29 December, against former club Haras El Hodoud and Ismaily respectively.

On 5 January 2023, Ashour made his hundredth competitive appearance with Zamalek in a 1–1 league draw against El Dakhleya. On 30 January, former Egypt international and FC Midtjylland player Mohamed Zidan revealed that Danish side Midtjylland had submitted a $3 million bid for Ashour. Zidan said: "FC Midtjylland enquired about Emam Ashour two weeks ago and asked me about my personal opinion of the player ... I told them that Ashour is a crucial player in the Egyptian Premier League, and has capabilities that will make him develop even further if he joins a club in Europe." He added that he communicated with Ashour after holding talks with Midtjylland, and gave him advice.

=== Midtjylland ===
On 31 January 2023, hours before the transfer deadline, Danish side Midtjylland signed Ashour on a four-and-a-half-year deal. The deal was worth 3 million euros, simultaneously making Ashour Midtjylland's fifth most expensive signing and Zamalek's third-most expensive sale. Ashour was given the shirt number 10. Midtjylland's director of football, Svend Graversen, said: "Emam has the potential to become a huge signing at Midtjylland. The fans can look forward to experiencing a dynamic midfielder who will be an important part of our team with his energy." Mortada Mansour, the president of Zamalek, claimed: "We told him [Ashour] that we would pay him what he wanted, but he insisted on leaving."

On 16 February 2023, Ashour was brought on as a substitute in the second half of a Europa League game against Sporting CP to make his Midtjylland debut. Within ten minutes of his introduction, he scored from distance with a first-time effort after a poor clearance from Sporting's goalkeeper Antonio Adán. The match ended in a 1–1 draw. In his post-match interview, Ashour thanked his teammates for their support and "warm welcome". Speaking to Mehwar TV, Ashour said: "I was fortunate to score my first goal for Midtjylland on my debut. It was a blessing from God". When asked about whether he would like to play in the English Premier League in the future, Ashour replied: "I play in a big club at the moment, and that’s what I focus on. I hope the next step in my career will be better, and I wish it will be a successful one".

On 20 February 2023, on his 25th birthday, Ashour scored in the fifth minute of his Danish Superliga debut, opening the scoring from close range in a 0–4 win against Viborg. The goal made Ashour the third Egyptian to score in the Danish Superliga, after Mohamed Zidan and Alexander Jakobsen, and the first since May 2017. On 23 February, Midtjylland exited the Europa League after a 4–0 loss in the reverse fixture against Sporting; Ashour started the game on the bench and was introduced after the interval. Ashour played four more matches in all competitions with Midtjylland; after manager Albert Capellas was dismissed in March 2023, his replacement Thomas Thomasberg rarely played him. On 29 April, Ashour suffered a hamstring injury during a Future Cup match against Viborg, and was ruled out for the rest of the season. Graversen said: "It is unfortunate that Emam will not be able to play more matches this season. At the same time, he is upset, and he did not want to end the season this way". Subsequently, Midtjylland granted him permission to return to Egypt for his recovery. However, Ashour then refused to return to Denmark, forcing the side to sell him. In July 2023, Capellas noted Ashour's hunger for success, adding: "When I left, I was personally concerned for Emam because he needed help in Denmark, especially with the language. The player came from Egypt and moved to Northern Europe, which was challenging, and thus he needed special care. ... I cared about him more on a personal level than as a footballer, and when the coach changes, things change. Emam did not get the playtime he deserved after my departure". In January 2024, Ashour said: "I faced difficulties with Midtjylland in Denmark – perhaps I couldn't adapt to the club. This was largely due to my state of mind; I couldn't settle in at all and wasn't able to play my natural game, so I decided to terminate my contract."

=== Al Ahly ===
==== 2023–24: Continental treble ====
Ashour was strongly linked with Al Ahly, the recent CAF Champions League winners; on 10 July 2023, journalist Ahmed Shobier said: "Emam Ashour is 99.99% Ahlawy ... The announcement will be made within days or hours after Al Ahly reaches a full agreement with all parties." The same day, Midtjylland signed a new central midfielder who could replace Ashour in Iver Fossum, from fellow Danish side Aalborg. On 18 July, Ashour joined Al Ahly from Midtjylland for $3 million, signing a 5-year contract. Midtjylland's director of football, Svend Graversen, said: "It has been a special journey with Emam, who unfortunately suffered a serious injury after a promising start. ... Of course, it's regrettable that we won’t be able to see Emam fulfill his potential. ... He is a talented player with great potential, but it’s also an example of what can happen when working with people. We have found a good solution with Al Ahly". Given Ashour's previous confrontations with Al Ahly whilst at Zamalek, Iván Cordovilla of Diario AS wrote that "the move naturally came as a shock to Egyptian football" and Mohammed Fayad of Arab News described it as "one of the most controversial transfers in Egyptian football". Zamalek president Mortada Mansour claimed that his club had refused to allow the return of Ashour, adding: "We closed the chapter of Emam Ashour because he wants to receive an annual salary of $1 million and we will not buy a player for $5 million. ... Emam Ashour is my gift to Mahmoud El Khatib [President of Al Ahly] and Al Ahly, just as I did with Kahraba". Ashour took the number 22 shirt, once worn by former Egypt international player Mohamed Aboutrika, and said: "It is a great honor for me to wear the number 22, previously worn by Al Ahly legend Mohamed Aboutrika. At first, people told me the number would be too heavy for me to carry, but on the contrary, it gave me motivation; I told them I would restore the number to its former glory."

On 15 September 2023, Ashour made his debut with Al Ahly in a 0–1 loss to USM Alger in the 2023 CAF Super Cup. On 4 October, Ashour scored his first goal for Al Ahly in a 3–0 win against ENPPI in the semi-finals of the 2022–23 Egypt Cup, earning Al Ahly a spot in the final. After the match, head coach Marcel Koller praised him, saying: "Emam is a technically gifted player who is so quick and skilful. I tried to play him as a winger today to utilise his pace." On 10 November, Ashour suffered a bruise to the shin and ankle in the 30th minute of a 3–1 win over Ismaily. It was later revealed that he had also picked up a minor sprain of the outer ankle ligament. He returned after 13 days. Ashour received particular praise for his performance in 3–0 CAF Champions League win over Medeama on 25 November; he provided "a beautiful cross" for Kahraba to score and was named man of the match. On 15 December, Ashour scored his first goal in the FIFA Club World Cup in a 3–1 win over Al-Ittihad in the competition's second round, saying: "It feels surreal, playing in this competition has always been one of my dreams, I'm quite happy". Al Ahly lost 2–0 against Fluminense in the semi-finals on 18 December, but won the third-place playoff 2–4 against Urawa Red Diamonds on 22 December, in which Ashour was named man of the match. In his post-match interview, he said: "I thank God first and foremost, we did everything we could, all the players pushed and fought hard till the last minute, I also want to thank the fans, who gave me the biggest push to claim this win". On 25 December, Ashour's cross caused Justice Arthur of Ceramica Cleopatra to score an own goal in the 94th minute of the Egyptian Super Cup semi-final, meaning Al Ahly progressed to the final. Reflecting on the team's performance, Ashour said: "We were up to the responsibility, and each one of us gave everything he had, which translated into victory and qualification to the final match of the tournament". In the final on 28 December, Al Ahly won the match 4–2 against Modern Future after extra time.

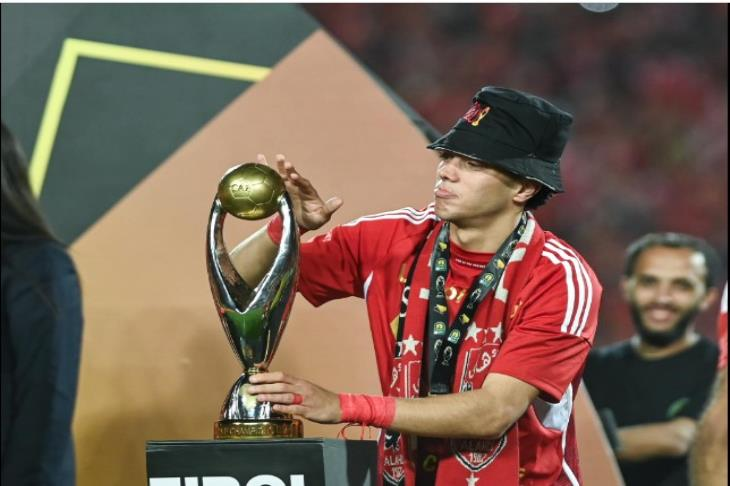
Ashour celebrates his first CAF Champions League title on 25 May 2024

On 8 March 2024, Ashour scored the opening goal of the 2023 Egypt Cup final (determining the 2022–23 Egypt Cup) against his former club Zamalek, and then assisted Mohamed Magdy, helping Al Ahly to an eventual 2–0 win. He was named man of the match, and was singled out for praise by José Mourinho. On 22 March 2024, Ashour dislocated his shoulder in a match with the national team; Al Ahly announced that he would undergo surgery the next day. He returned to training on 23 April. Ashour netted his first league goal for Al Ahly on 1 May, finishing "a skillful solo effort" in a 1–2 win over Ismaily. On 4 May, Ashour scored from long-range in a 3–0 victory against El Gouna. On 25 May, Ashour helped Al Ahly to a 1–0 win in the second leg of the 2024 CAF Champions League final against Espérance de Tunis. On 14 June, Ashour scored a brace in nine minutes to bring Al Ahly to a 2–1 win over Pharco FC, netting a penalty and then a "thunderbolt into the top of the net".

On 20 June, Ashour assaulted a security guard, Abdullah Mostafa, at a mall in Sheikh Zayed. Ashour and several others struck Mostafa repeatedly such that he lost consciousness; a medical examination at Sheikh Zayed Central Hospital confirmed that Mostafa sustained a bruise on his right leg. Ashour claimed that he had received a phone call from his wife, Yasmine Hafez, telling him that "a group of young men harassed her and that security did not intervene". He said that he was prevented from entering the mall, and that he snatched "The mobile phone that was in the possession of the victim security guard because he was filming him while he and others were there". Ashour scored another brace in a 4–1 win against El Dakhleya on 4 July. On 16 July, Ashour scored in a 1–2 win over Modern Future. He netted a penalty on 29 July in a 4–1 win against Ceramica Cleopatra. On 8 August, Ashour won his first league title with Al Ahly after a 0–1 win over Smouha. Ahmed Abdullah of Al-Masry Al-Youm wrote that Ashour had established himself as one of Al Ahly's standout players over the season, noting his 10 [9] goals and 9 assists in 40 matches. Fathy El-Shafei and Lobna Abdallah of Youm7 concurred, adding that the season was the best of his career in terms of goal contributions. During the summer transfer window, an Al Ahly source stated that Ashour would not be sold, and that he wanted to remain at the club. The source added that whilst Al Ahly had not received any offers for Ashour, it expected foreign interest.

==== 2024–25: Best Player in Egyptian Premier League ====
On 27 September 2024, Ashour played 66 minutes of the 2024 CAF Super Cup match against Zamalek; Zamalek ultimately won the match 4–3 on penalties. On 24 October, Ashour played 91 minutes of the 2024 Egyptian Super Cup final, also against Zamalek, to bring Al Ahly to another penalty shoot-out after a goalless draw. Al Ahly won 7–6 on penalties, earning Ashour his third Egyptian Super Cup title. On 29 October, as part of the 2024 FIFA Intercontinental Cup, Ashour scored a goal to help Al Ahly to a 3–0 win against Al Ain with a "a sublime volley shot inside the box", thereby winning the FIFA African–Asian–Pacific Cup. On 8 November 2024, Ashour was injured during a league match against ZED. Tests revealed he had suffered a minor hamstring strain. On 12 November 2024, Ashour was sentenced to prison for six months for his earlier assault of Abdullah Mostafa, after accepting the Public Prosecution's appeal against his acquittal. Ashour eventually avoided jail time by paying financial compensation to Mostafa, though Mostafa's lawyer, Ali Fayez, stated that the verdict against Ashour did not include bail, meaning that Ashour, if arrested again, would remain in custody until at least the date of the appeal hearing.

On 26 November 2024, Ashour did not start in a CAF Champions League match against Stade d'Abidjan. Prior to training, goalkeeper Mohamed El Shenawy approached Ashour, urging him to calm down, which led to a confrontation between the two players. Other teammates and sporting director Mohamed Ramadan were required to defuse the situation. As a result, training was delayed until 11am, and after a meeting between Ramadan and coach Marcel Koller, it was decided that Ashour would be suspended from training. In response, Ashour left the training ground, and skipped the photo shoot for the Intercontinental Cup. The club then suspended him, forcing him to train alone, and fined him 1 million Egyptian pounds (nearly €20,000). Ashour issued a statement on Instagram, saying: "I apologize for any mistakes or for causing any frustration, and I accept my punishment, as it’s only fair. ... Unfortunately, some believe that fabricating news on social media and spreading lies can affect my relationship with Al Ahly fans, but this will not happen."

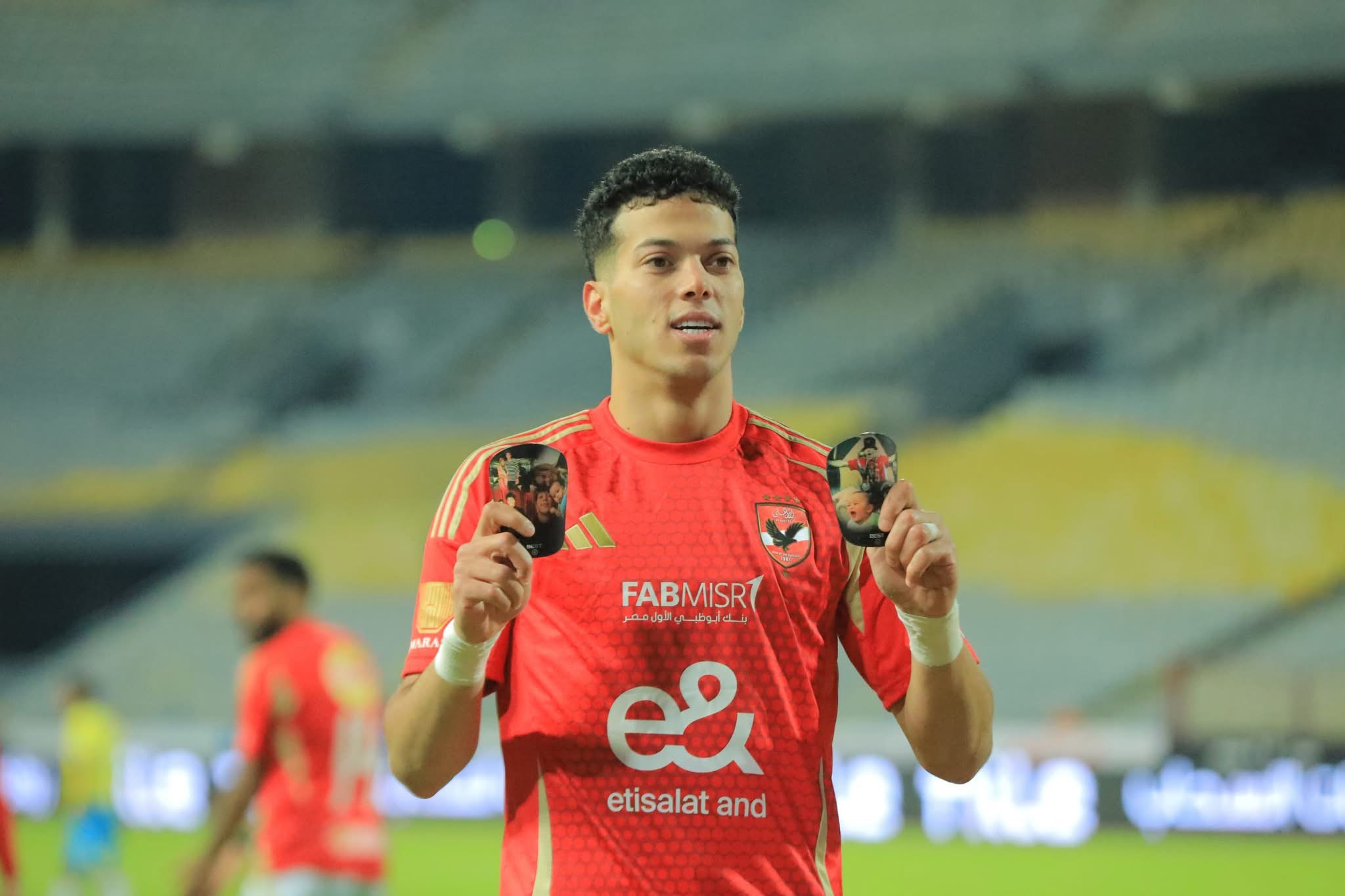
Emam Ashour celebrates a goal for Al Ahly in a 4–0 win against Ismaily in the Egyptian Premier League on 16 February 2025

On 22 December 2024, Ashour received particular praise for his performance in a 6–1 match against Belouizdad in the 2024–25 CAF Champions League group stage; Mahmoud Elassal of Ahram Online wrote that "the man orchestrated Ahly's second half display, [and] put the icing on the cake with a powerful strike from outside the box to wrap up a 6–1 scoreline." On 11 January 2025, Ashour scored his first ever hat-trick against Stade d'Abidjan in the group stage of the CAF Champions League. He said in his post-match interview: "It was a tough match with many absences due to injury, but the team's spirit and determination made the victory possible. ... Since joining Al Ahly, I've given my all to help the team win. We will keep fighting for victory in every match." On 7 January, Ashour scored in a 2–0 win over Smouha. On 15 January, Ashour scored a brace in a 2–0 victory over Gouna, giving him eight goal contributions in his last seven matches. On 22 January, Ashour extended his scoring streak to three games, as he netted a penalty in a 1–1 draw to Pharco FC. On 28 January, Ashour missed a panenka penalty at the end of regulation time, denying Al Ahly a potential winning goal in a 2–2 draw against Zamalek. Between 2 and 16 February, he scored 5 more league goals in four matches; a brace against Modern Sport, and one goal against Petrojet, Ghazl El Mahalla, and Ismaily. With this goal against Petrojet on 6 February, he moved ahead of Nasser Mansi of Zamalek in the race to become the league's top goalscorer, and consolidated his best-ever start to an Egyptian League season.

On 8 April 2025, Ashour scored the lone goal in a 1–0 quarter-final CAF Champions League win over Sudanese side Al Hilal, sending Al Ahly through to the semi-final. However, the club were eliminated in the semi-finals on 25 April as the Mamelodi Sundowns won on away goals. On 8 May, Ashour scored a brace, with the aid of one penalty, in a 4–2 victory over Al Masry, bringing Al Ahly to the top of the league. Ashour netted again in a 2–1 win over National Bank of Egypt on 17 May. On 28 May, Ashour scored the final goal in a 6–0 win against Pharco FC, helping Al Ahly to their 45th Egyptian league title. During the league season, Ashour was named man of the match on 7 occasions, the most of any player that season. On 15 June, Ashour was ruled out of Al Ahly's squad for the 2025 FIFA Club World Cup after suffering a broken collarbone during the opening goalless match against Inter Miami, and subsequently returned to Cairo. During July, Ashour received interest from Al-Okhdood of Saudi Arabia; on 13 July, Al Ahly revealed that they had sent a letter to Al-Okhdood requesting clarification on the financial terms of any proposed offers. On 3 August 2025, Ashour was named the league's top goalscorer and best player, with 13 goals in 23 appearances. In response, Ashour thanked Al Ahly's fans, and said via Instagram that he was "happy and proud of winning the Egyptian Premier League Best Player and Top Scorer trophies". He added: "Individual awards don't come without effort – they require hard work and support from many people". On 16 August 2025, Al Ahly stated that Ashour would return to training after his recovery on 18 August. On 16 September, Al Ahly stated that Ashour had been diagnosed with a viral infection, later revealed to be Hepatitis A, and had been hospitalised the day before as a precautionary measure. In mid-October, reports suggested that the New York Red Bulls in the United States had made an offer for Ashour, proposing a six-month loan agreement valued at $1.5 million, accompanied by a purchase option set at $5 million. However, on 20 October, Joe Pantorno of amNewYork said that the Red Bulls' interest in Ashour was "low".

==== 2025–26: Injuries and 100th appearance ====
Ashour missed the 2025 Egyptian Super Cup campaign and the final on 9 November 2025, which Al Ahly won against Zamalek 2–0. On 20 November 2025, Ashour returned to training after recovery from the virus, ending a 69-day period out. On 22 November, he featured as an 80th-minute substitute in a 4–1 win against JS Kabylie, the opening game of the 2025–26 CAF Champions League group stage. He marked his return with a 90+3rd-minute goal – "a stunning strike in injury time" – which was later retrospectively ruled an own goal, since the shot deflected off goalkeeper Mohamed Hadid's hand. In early January 2026, reports suggested that Al Ahly had received offers from clubs in foreign leagues – including the Turkish Süper Lig – worth over 300 million Egyptian pounds for Ashour. On 27 January, Ashour won a penalty, converted by Zizo, and later assisted Marwan Osman in a 3–1 win over Wadi Degla. On 29 January, Al Ahly imposed an EGP 1.5 million (nearly $32,000) fine upon Ashour and suspended him for two weeks, forcing him to train alone, after he failed to join the team on a flight to Tanzania in order to play against the Young Africans in the CAF Champions League. The financial penalty was the largest in the club's history. Head coach Jess Thorup said that "The player made a mistake. I said it from my very first day here: no one is above the team." Reports in Egyptian media said that Ashour's decision to miss the trip was a form of protest following a dispute with teammates over taking a penalty in a 3–1 league win over Wadi Degla on 27 January. However, on 30 January, Ashour claimed on Instagram: "The majority of the claims about what happened aren’t true, and I accept any decision by the club ... I am confident that Ahly officials will understand my situation. I am suffering from flu, a high fever, and stomach pains, and I am taking the necessary medication." Ashour added that several members of his family were experiencing the same symptoms, and said that he made "an unintentional mistake" in neglecting to inform the club. Hossam Ahmed of Pan Africa Football wrote that "Ashour now holds the record for the highest fine ever imposed by Al Ahly, despite the player’s status as one of the best players in the team, if not the best." On 11 February, Ibrahim Hassan, the director of the Egyptian national team, denied on television that the national team staff had intervened in the dispute. He added that Ashour could sometimes be affected by misinformation, which had the potential to disrupt his focus.

On 6 February 2026, reports suggested that Ashour had been allowed to leave Al Ahly if he wished, and that the club had set his price at $12 million for clubs interested in signing. On 13 February, Ashour returned to training as Al Ahly prepared for its upcoming CAF Champions League match against AS FAR. On 19 February, Ashour opened his goal account for the league season, scoring a header in a 1–0 win over El Gouna. Ashour scored against Al Mokawloon in a 1–3 win on 5 March. On 21 March, Ashour's Al Ahly exited the CAF Champions League thanks to a 4–2 aggregate loss to Espérance de Tunis. On 7 April, Ashour made his 100th competitive Al Ahly appearance in a 1–1 league draw against Cleopatra FC. On 5 May, Ashour sustained a knee bruise during a 3–0 league win against ENPPI. He was able to take part in training sessions again on 11 May, and the team's doctor Ahmed Gaballah confirmed his recovery the next day. Although Ashour's Al Ahly were in contention for the league title, Zamalek clinched the title on 20 May with a win against Cleopatra. During the 2025–26 league season, Ashour's expected assists figure was 0.38 per 90 minutes, which put him in the top 99% of the Egyptian top flight.

In July 2026, following Ashour's World Cup campaign, Celtic reportedly made initial enquiries concerning the acquisition of Ashour for £4 million. Brighton & Hove Albion, West Ham United, and Derby County in England – as well as Neom in Saudi Arabia – also expressed interest in signing him. Coventry City's manager, Frank Lampard, was reportedly personally interested in signing Ashour. On 20 July, a source close to Ashour reported that Al Ahly had rejected a $6 million bid for the player from Al-Ittihad (Jeddah). On 18 August, Al Ahly rejected Konyaspor's $4.5 million offer for Ashour, having previously rejected their $3 million bid. Al Ahly informed Konyaspor that Ashour would not be sold that season, though the club acknowledged the possibility of "future cooperation". On 26 August, Ashour extended his contract with Al Ahly until 2030. Ashour would reportedly receive an annual salary of 25 million EGP, alongside an immediate 5 million signing bonus and up to 10 million in performance-related bonuses each season. After completing the extension, Ashour said: "Al Ahly is life to me."

== International career ==
=== 2019–2025: Youth international and AFCON final ===
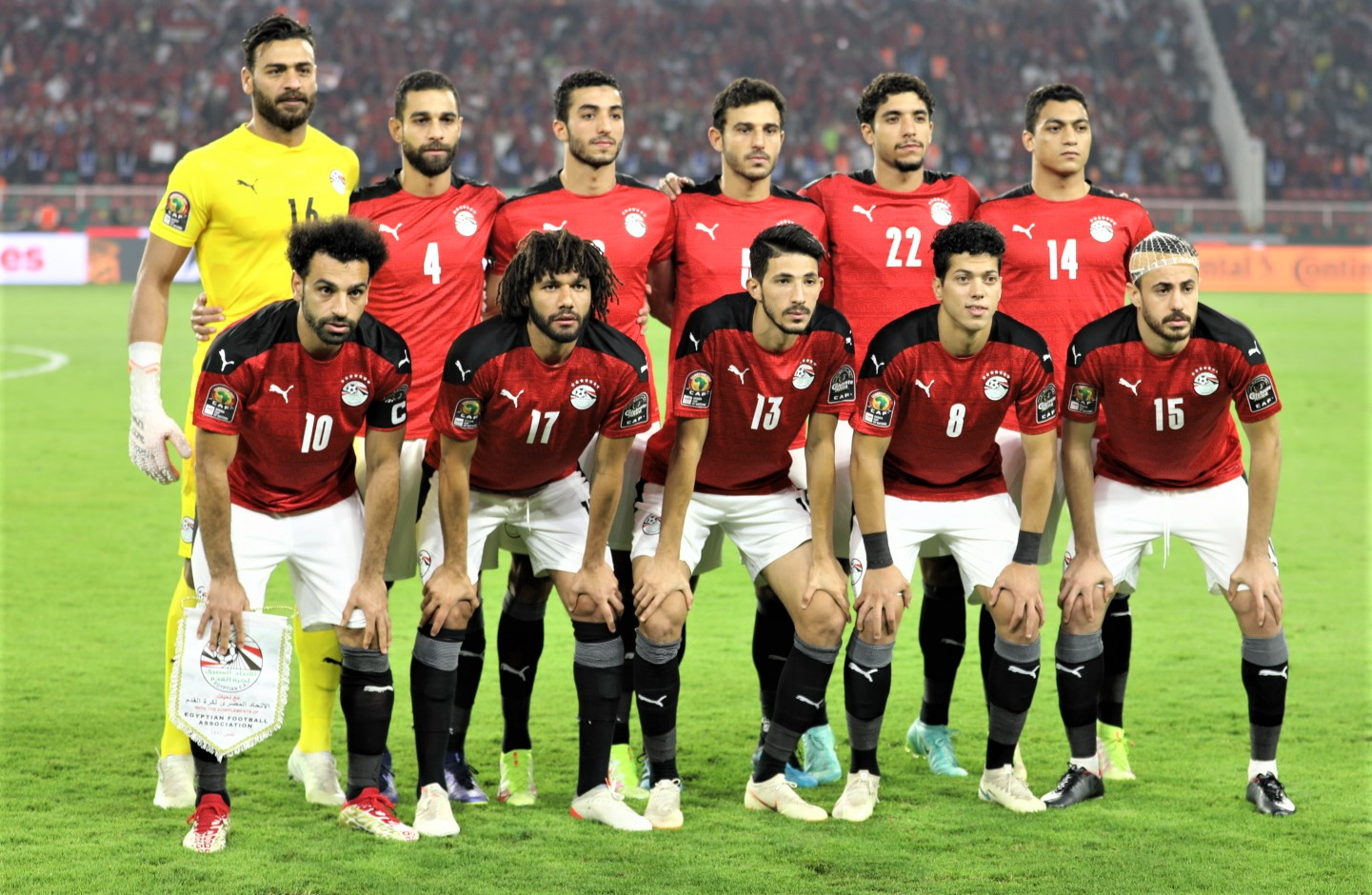
Ashour (bottom row, second-to-right) lining up as part of the Egyptian team for the 2021 Africa Cup of Nations final

Ashour played for the Egypt U23 team in the 2019 U-23 Africa Cup of Nations, and won the title. In 2021, he was called up by the Egyptian national Olympic team to participate in the Games of the 2020 Olympic Games in Tokyo. On 20 November 2021, Carlos Queiroz selected Ashour as part of Egypt's final squad for the 2021 FIFA Arab Cup. On 23 November, Ashour tested positive for COVID-19, and was replaced by Ahmed Hegazi on 27 November. Participating in the 2021 Africa Cup of Nations, Ashour started as a right-back in the final against Senegal in place of the suspended Omar Kamal. Mohamed Yossry of Reuters wrote that "Despite limited experience in the role, he largely kept the Senegal forward [i.e. Sadio Mané] quiet, though Egypt were ‌beaten on penalties after a goalless draw."

At the 2023 Africa Cup of Nations, Ashour played "a key role" as a playmaker. However, on 24 January 2024, Ashour suffered a severe concussion during a training session, forcing him to spend a day at a hospital as a precautionary measure. Some reports said that he collided with a teammate, whilst others claimed that he was injured whilst attempting a backflip. On 26 January, speaking of the injury, Ashour said on Instagram: "Praise be to God for everything. First of all, I was between life and death, and what I saw yesterday, I wouldn’t wish anyone to see. ... I thank everyone who supported me yesterday, the team doctors, players, and the administrative staff." Ashour missed the last-16 defeat by DR Congo on 28 January, and had six days of rest. On 22 March 2024, during a friendly match against New Zealand, which Egypt eventually won 1–0, Ashour was substituted off early with an injury, later revealed to be a dislocated shoulder. The next day, Al Ahly announced that Ashour was to undergo shoulder surgery. On 5 September 2024, Ashour withdrew from the Egypt squad for their first two matches of the qualification for the 2025 Africa Cup of Nations due to a minor knee injury.

=== 2025–2026: 2026 World Cup campaign ===
In March 2025, Ashour was left out of Egypt's latest World Cup qualifiers squad, missing two matches against Ethiopia and Sierra Leone. On 25 March, head coach Hossam Hassan said: "Ashour's omission is a disciplinary decision. He pretended to be injured with the national team before, and suddenly he played with Ahly. If he apologizes and admits his mistake, he will rejoin the team again". He added that Ashour had previously displayed unprofessionalism with the national team, but that there was a 90% chance he would return. Reports in the media later said that Ashour was willing to offer a formal apology via his social media accounts. On 2 December 2025, Ashour was called up to the Egypt squad for the 2025 Africa Cup of Nations. After having spent 554 days without playing for the national team, he returned on 16 December for a preceding 2–1 friendly win against Nigeria. During the tournament itself, Ashour contributed with two assists. Egypt eventually finished in fourth place.

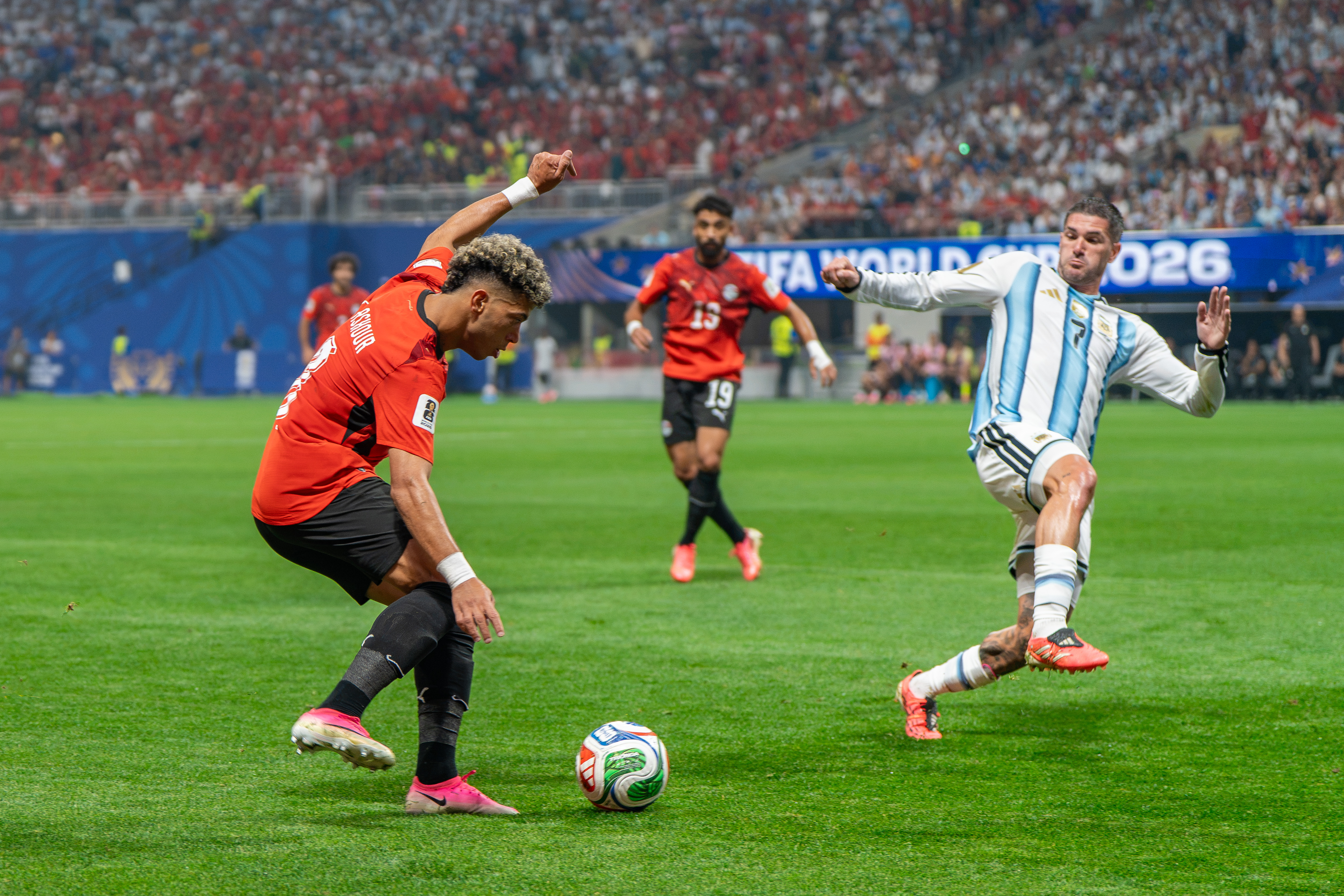
Ashour facing up against Argentina's Rodrigo de Paul on 7 July 2026

He was named in the 26-man squad for the 2026 FIFA World Cup. On 15 June 2026, Ashour scored his first international goal for Egypt in their 2026 FIFA World Cup opener against Belgium which ended 1–1; it was the most powerful goal in the first round of group-stage games at World Cup, at 123.4 kph. Joe Rindl of BBC Sport wrote that Ashour "thundered a 20-yard strike into the bottom corner past Thibaut Courtois." Ashour was also named man of the match; in his post-match interview, he said: "We were determined to secure the win by adding another goal ... we feel disappointed [with the draw] and we wanted to win". His teammate Omar Marmoush said: "It was amazing ... Congratulations for him, for the goal, for winning the man of the match. Emam is a big, big, quality player." Former Egypt international Mohamed Aboutrika praised his contribution, saying: "His first touch helped him make the decision ... Some goalkeepers expect the shot to go to the far corner but that first touch made it difficult for Courtois." Ashour then scored his second World Cup goal on 3 July 2026, opening the scoring in a 1–1 draw with Australia in the round of 32, which ended in a 4–2 penalty shootout victory. Hence, he became the first Egyptian to score in the World Cup knockout stages, and the third Egyptian player to score multiple goals in the tournament, after Abdelrahman Fawzy and Mohamed Salah. In the next game against Argentina on 7 July, Egypt controversially lost 3–2; amongst several incidents in the game was Nahuel Molina's unpunished slap of Ashour; Ashour appealed for a foul but did not go to ground. He was also substituted off immediately after halftime with an injury, having informed the coaching staff that he could not carry on at the end of the first half. In the aftermath of the match, Ashour said: "We had big dreams in this World Cup, but they were shattered after the defeat to Argentina ... It was a great achievement to compete with the world champions. We were leading 2–0, but in the end that's what happened". He added: "I apologise to all the Egyptian fans for the defeat. We promise to make you proud in the coming tournaments." In FIFA's list of the best Egyptian players at the tournament, Ashour finished first. He later spoke of how his relationship with coach Hassan had evolved from initial disagreement to clear mutual understanding and harmony.

== Player profile ==
Ashour is a versatile player, capable of operating as a striker, winger or central midfielder when needed although he is naturally an attacking midfielder. Ashour himself said in 2023: "I can play in any position on the pitch; I have no objections. I've played everywhere – the only position I haven't tried is goalkeeper – but I feel most comfortable in the 'number 8' role."

Iván Cordovilla of Diario AS said: "He is truly an exceptional player." As he progressed up the ranks at Zamalek, Karim Saeed and Maha Salah El-Din of Masrawy compared Ashour favourably to his fellow midfielder Ferjani Sassi, noting his greater goal tallies and ball recoveries. On 3 July 2026, after Ashour scored against Australia in the round of 32 of the 2026 World Cup, former England forward Wayne Rooney said: "It is wonderful to watch Emam Ashour perform at this level with Egypt at this stage of the tournament ... He is a player with great quality on the ball, and he makes many sacrifices for his national team." He added: "I do not understand why he does not play in Europe ... This type of player deserves greater appreciation and respect in line with his talent."

Ashour has been criticised for his disciplinary issues; Cordovilla (Diario AS) wrote that "He is an exciting player – the kind who captivates the viewer and makes one wonder why he isn't playing in a major European league, given that he clearly possesses the requisite talent. However, the situation becomes less puzzling when looking back at his history of disciplinary – and even criminal – issues." However, after the 2026 FIFA World Cup, some fans opined that Ashour had settled down.

== Career statistics ==
=== Club ===
As of matches played 20 May 2026

Appearances and goals by club, season and competition
Club	Season	League			National cup (Note: Includes Egypt Cup)		Continental		Other		Total	
Club	Season	Division	Apps	Goals	Apps	Goals	Apps	Goals	Apps	Goals	Apps	Goals
Haras El Hodoud	2018–19	Egyptian Premier League	31	4	1	0	—		—		32	4
Zamalek	2018–19	Egyptian Premier League	0	0	3	0	—		1 (Note: Appearance in Egyptian Super Cup)	0	4	0
Zamalek	2019–20	Egyptian Premier League	12	1	2	1	—		—		14	2
Zamalek	2020–21	Egyptian Premier League	21	5	3	1	4 (Note: Appearances in CAF Champions League)	0	—		28	6
Zamalek	2021–22	Egyptian Premier League	29	5	3	0	7	0	1	0	40	5
Zamalek	2022–23	Egyptian Premier League	15	2	—		1	0	—		16	2
Zamalek	Total		77	13	11	2	12	0	2	0	102	15
Midtjylland	2022–23	Danish Superliga	5	1	—		2 (Note: Appearances in UEFA Europa League)	1	—		7	2
Al Ahly	2022–23	Egyptian Premier League	0	0	2	2	—		—		2	2
Al Ahly	2023–24	Egyptian Premier League	26	8	—		11	0	7 (Note: One appearance in African Football League, two appearances in Egyptian Super Cup, three appearances and one goal in FIFA Club World Cup, one appearance in CAF Super Cup)	1	44	9
Al Ahly	2024–25	Egyptian Premier League	23	13	—		11	5	6 (Note: Two appearances in Egyptian Super Cup, two appearances and one goal in FIFA Club World Cup, one appearance in CAF Super Cup)	1	40	19
Al Ahly	2025–26	Egyptian Premier League	13	2	—		6	0	—		19	2
Al Ahly	2026–27	Egyptian Premier League	2	0	—		—		—		2	0
Al Ahly	Total		64	23	2	2	28	5	13	2	107	32
Career total			147	23	14	4	31	5	14	2	231	51

=== International ===
As of match played 7 July 2026

Appearances and goals by national team and year
National team	Year	Apps	Goals
Egypt	2021	1	0
Egypt	2022	8	0
Egypt	2023	2	0
Egypt	2024	7	0
Egypt	2025	3	0
Egypt	2026	12	2
Total		34	2

Scores and results list Egypt's goal tally first, score column indicates score after each Ashour goal.

List of international goals scored by Emam Ashour
No.	Date	Venue	Cap	Opponent	Score	Result	Competition
1	14 June 2026	Lumen Field, Seattle, United States	30	Belgium	1–0	1–1	2026 FIFA World Cup
2	3 July 2026	AT&T Stadium, Arlington, United States	33	Australia	1–0	1–1 (a.e.t.) (4–2 p)	2026 FIFA World Cup

== Honours ==
Zamalek

- Egyptian Premier League: 2020–21, 2021–22
- Egypt Cup: 2018–19, 2020–21
- Egyptian Super Cup: 2018–19; runner-up: 2017–18, 2021–22

Al Ahly

- Egyptian Premier League: 2023–24, 2024–25
- Egypt Cup: 2022–23
- Egyptian Super Cup: 2023–24, 2024–25
- CAF Champions League: 2023–24
- CAF Super Cup runner-up: 2024
- FIFA African–Asian–Pacific Cup: 2024
- FIFA Challenger Cup runner-up: 2024

Egypt U23

- Africa U-23 Cup of Nations: 2019

Individual

- Egyptian Premier League top goalscorer: 2024–25
- Egyptian Premier League best player: 2024–25
- Egyptian Premier League Team of the Season: 2023–24, 2024–25
