= 2025 Egyptian Super Cup final =

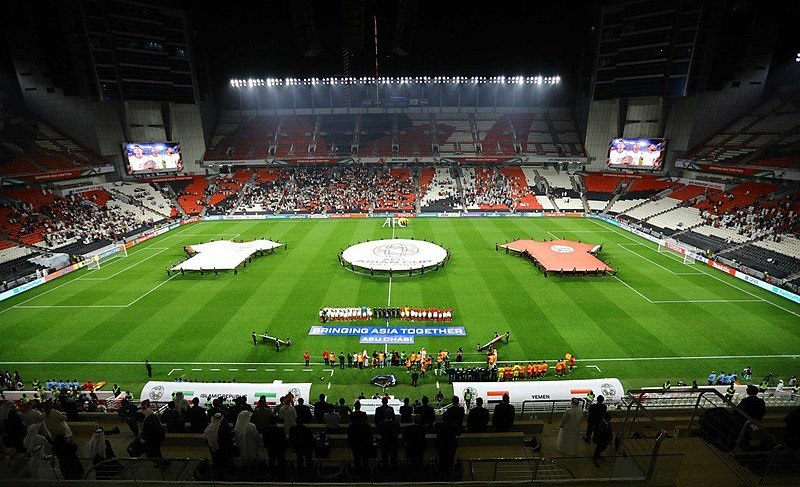
- Mohammed bin Zayed Stadium hosted the match
Al Ahly	Zamalek
2	0
- Date: 9 November 2025
- Venue: Mohammed bin Zayed Stadium, Abu Dhabi
- Man of the Match: Zizo (Al Ahly)
- Referee: Halil Umut Meler

The 2025 Egyptian Super Cup final was the final match of the 2025 Egyptian Super Cup, the 23nd edition of the competition since its establishment in 2001, and the third under the new four-team format. It was played between Al Ahly and Zamalek on 9 November 2025 at Mohammed bin Zayed Stadium in Abu Dhabi, United Arab Emirates.

Al Ahly won the match 2–0, winning a record-extending 16th Egyptian Super Cup title.

== Route to the final ==
Al Ahly		Round	Zamalek	
Opponent	Result	2025 Egyptian Super Cup	Opponent	Result
Ceramica Cleopatra	2–1	Semi-finals	Pyramids	0–0 (5–4 p)

== Officials ==
The match officials were announced by the Egyptian Football Association on 8 November 2025, one day before the final. Halil Umut Meler from Turkey was selected as the referee for the match, with Ceyhun Sesigüzel and Abdullah Bora Özkara as assistant referees, and the Emirati Suhail Al-Mulla as the fourth official. The VAR referee was the Hungarian István Vad, assisted by the Mexican Ángel Monroy Bello.

== Match ==
=== Details ===
9 November 2025
19:30 GST

Al Ahly	2–0	Zamalek
Bencharki 44'; Attia 72'	Report

Mohammed bin Zayed Stadium, Abu Dhabi
Referee: Halil Umut Meler (Turkey)

Al Ahly	Zamalek

GK	1	(Egypt) Mohamed El Shenawy (c)
RB	30	(Egypt) Mohamed Hany
CB	6	(Egypt) Yasser Ibrahim
CB	2	(Egypt) Yassin Marei	(yellow card) 60'
LB	36	(Egypt) Ahmed Nabil Koka
CM	23	(Mali) Aliou Dieng
CM	13	(Egypt) Marwan Attia	(yellow card) 49'
RW	25	(Egypt) Zizo
LW	17	(Morocco) Achraf Bencharki	(yellow card) 61'	(substituted off) 82'
CF	7	(Egypt) Trézéguet		(substituted off) 69'
ST	9	(Slovenia) Nejc Gradišar	(yellow card) 41'	(substituted off) 57'
Substitutes:
GK	31	(Egypt) Mostafa Shobeir
DF	3	(Egypt) Omar Kamal
DF	4	(Egypt) Ahmed Ramadan		(substituted on) 82'
DF	12	(Egypt) Mohamed Shokry
MF	5	(Tunisia) Mohamed Ben Romdhane		(substituted on) 69'
FW	10	(Egypt) Mohamed Sherif
FW	11	(Egypt) Ahmed Abdel Kader
FW	29	(Egypt) Taher Mohamed		(substituted on) 57'
FW	38	(Egypt) Mohamed Abdallah
Manager:
(Denmark) Jess Thorup

GK	1	(Egypt) Mohamed Awad
RB	4	(Egypt) Omar Gaber (c)
CB	28	(Egypt) Mahmoud Hamdy
CB	24	(Egypt) Mohamed Ismail		(substituted off) 46'
LB	13	(Egypt) Ahmed Fatouh
CM	17	(Egypt) Mohamed Shehata
CM	19	(Egypt) Abdallah El Said	(yellow card) 70'	(substituted off) 77'
RW	7	(Egypt) Seif Gaafar		(substituted off) 46'
AM	22	(Egypt) Nasser Maher
LW	81	(Angola) Chico Banza		(substituted off) 87'
CF	90	(Egypt) Amr Nasser		(substituted off) 46'
Substitutes:
GK	37	(Egypt) El Mahdy Soliman
DF	5	(Egypt) Hossam Abdelmaguid		(substituted on) 46'
DF	15	(Morocco) Sallah Moussaddaq
MF	12	(Egypt) Ahmed Rabie
FW	14	(Egypt) Ahmed Hamdi		(substituted on) 77'
FW	30	(Tunisia) Seifeddine Jaziri	(yellow card) 61'	(substituted on) 46'
FW	31	(Egypt) Ahmed Sherif		(substituted on) 87'
FW	33	(Brazil) Juan Alvina	(yellow card) 52'	(substituted on) 46'
FW	98	(Palestine) Oday Dabbagh
Manager:
(Egypt) Ahmed Abdel Raouf

Man of the Match:
Zizo (Al Ahly)

Assistant referees:
Ceyhun Sesigüzel (Turkey)
Abdullah Bora Özkara (Turkey)
Fourth official:
Suhail Al-Mulla (UAE)
Video assistant referee:
István Vad (Hungary)
Assistant video assistant referee:
Ángel Monroy Bello (Mexico)

Match rules

- 90 minutes
- 30 minutes of extra time if necessary
- Penalty shoot-out if scores still level
- Nine named substitutes
- Maximum of five substitutions, with a sixth allowed in extra time (Note: Each team was given only three opportunities to make substitutions, with a fourth opportunity in extra time, excluding substitutions made at half-time, before the start of extra time and at half-time in extra time.)
