= 2022–23 Egypt Cup =

كأس مصر

Tournament details
- Country: Egypt
- Dates: 26 October 2022 – 8 March 2024
- Teams: 110

Final positions
- Champions: Al Ahly (39th title)
- Runners-up: Zamalek

Tournament statistics
- Matches played: 28
- Goals scored: 89 (3.18 per match)
- Top goal scorer(s): Seifeddine Jaziri (4 goals)

The 2022–23 Egypt Cup was the 91st season of the premier knockout competition. The Egyptian Football Association oversees the Egypt Cup. It started with the First Preliminary Round on 26 October 2022, and concluded with the final on 8 March 2024.

== Format ==
In the first and second preliminary rounds, when the match ends in a tie in normal time, extra time is not played and the winner is decided through a penalty shoot-out.

== Schedule ==
The schedule for the tournament stages is as follows:

Round	Draw date	Matches
First preliminary round	16 October 2022	26 October 2022
Second preliminary round	30 October 2022	2 November 2022
Third preliminary round	2–3 January 2023	22–26 January 2023
Fourth preliminary round	25 January 2023	26–31 January 2023
Round of 32	1 May 2023	7 May – 25 June 2023
Round of 16	1 May 2023	28 May – 30 July 2023
Quarter-finals	1 May 2023	3 July – 3 August 2023
Semi-finals	1 May 2023	4 October – 8 November 2023
Final	1 May 2023	8 March 2024

== Competition ==
=== First preliminary round ===
The draw for the preliminary round took place on 16 October 2022. Fourth and third division clubs join in this round. 51 teams will compete, of which 25 will qualify for the next round.

26 October 2022	Mansheyet Naser	0–2	El Marg
--:-- EST (UTC+2)

	Helwan El-Aam	2–0 (awd.)	Al-Shams
--:-- EST (UTC+2)
Note: The match was awarded as a 2–0 win for Helwan El-Aam following Al-Shams' withdrawal.

26 October 2022	Misr Lel Taamin	0–0 (4–5 p)	Alo Egypt
--:-- EST (UTC+2)

26 October 2022	Maadi & Yacht	0–0 (2–4 p)	Heliopolis	Maadi
--:-- EST (UTC+2)		Report		Stadium: Maadi and El-Yacht Club

26 October 2022	Al Tayaran	2–0	HFC Club
--:-- EST (UTC+2)

26 October 2022	Orange	1–1 (6–5 p)	Sed Dokki
--:-- EST (UTC+2)

26 October 2022	Goldi	1–1 (2–4 p)	Nogoom
--:-- EST (UTC+2)

26 October 2022	Banha	2–1	Shubra El Kheima El Pelastic
--:-- EST (UTC+2)

26 October 2022	Mido	0–1	Fleet Club
--:-- EST (UTC+2)

26 October 2022	Samanoud	2–1	Seid El Mahalla
--:-- EST (UTC+2)

26 October 2022	Sporting Castle	5–0	Markaz Shabab Qasta
--:-- EST (UTC+2)

26 October 2022	Markaz Shabab Basyoun	0–0 (5–3 p)	Othmathon Tanta	Basyoun
--:-- EST (UTC+2)		Report

26 October 2022	Sherbin	1–1 (4–2 p)	Belqas
--:-- EST (UTC+2)	Gamal 33' (pen.)		Nasr 78' (pen.)

26 October 2022	Bani Obeid	1–1 (7–8 p)	MS Minyat Samanoud
--:-- EST (UTC+2)

26 October 2022	Desouk	0–0 (2–3 p)	Beila
--:-- EST (UTC+2)

26 October 2022	Minyat Al Nasr	2–2 (2–3 p)	Al-Zafaran
--:-- EST (UTC+2)

26 October 2022	Markaz Shabab Al-Qazzazin	3–1	Ghazl Damietta
--:-- EST (UTC+2)

26 October 2022	Markaz Shabab Abshish	0–3	Al-Sharqiya	Ashmoun
--:-- EST (UTC+2)			Shukoku 4'; Mustafa 28'; Samir 36'	Stadium: Ashmoun Youth Center stadium

26 October 2022	Raya Ghazl Kafr El Dawar	3–1	Ala'ab Damanhour
--:-- EST (UTC+2)

26 October 2022	Port Fouad	1–2	Al-Merikh
--:-- EST (UTC+2)

26 October 2022	Al-Nasr Faiyum	0–5	Tutankhamun
--:-- EST (UTC+2)

26 October 2022	Al Wasta	1–1 (1–4 p)	Beni Suef
--:-- EST (UTC+2)

26 October 2022	Markaz Shabab Maghagha	1–1 (4–3 p)	Maghagha
--:-- EST (UTC+2)

26 October 2022	Nogoom Masr	1–2	Beni Mazar
--:-- EST (UTC+2)

26 October 2022	Shabab Moslem Asyut	0–0 (3–4 p)	Al-Qusiya
--:-- EST (UTC+2)

Shabab Moslem Esna	bye

=== Second preliminary round ===
The draw took place on 30 October 2022.

2 November 2022	El Marg	2–1	Helwan El-Aam
14:00 EST (UTC+2)

2 November 2022	Alo Egypt	1–0	Heliopolis
14:00 EST (UTC+2)

2 November 2022	Al Tayaran	2–1	Orange
14:00 EST (UTC+2)

2 November 2022	Nogoom	2–1	Banha
14:00 EST (UTC+2)

2 November 2022	Fleet Club	3–0	Samanoud
14:00 EST (UTC+2)

2 November 2022	Sporting Castle	3–1	Markaz Shabab Basyoun
14:00 EST (UTC+2)

2 November 2022	Sherbin	0–3	MS Minyat Samanoud
14:00 EST (UTC+2)

2 November 2022	Beila	0–2	Minyat Al Nasr
14:00 EST (UTC+2)

2 November 2022	Markaz Shabab Al-Qazzazin	0–1	Al-Sharqiya
14:00 EST (UTC+2)

2 November 2022	Raya Ghazl Kafr El Dawar	1–1 (– p)	Al-Merikh
14:00 EST (UTC+2)

2 November 2022	Tutankhamun	1–1 (1–4 p)	Beni Suef
14:00 EST (UTC+2)

2 November 2022	Markaz Shabab Maghagha	0–1	Beni Mazar
14:00 EST (UTC+2)

2 November 2022	Al-Qusiya	0–0 (3–4 p)	Shabab Moslem Esna
14:00 EST (UTC+2)

Markaz Shabab Al-Sarw	bye

=== Third preliminary round ===
Second division clubs join in this round.

23 January 2023	Muslim Youths (Qena)	2–2	Young Muslims Esna
14:00

23 January 2023	Beni Suef	0–2	La Vienna
14:00

24 January 2023	KIMA Aswan	0–0 (5–4 p)	El Gouna
14:00

23 January 2023	Beni Mazar	0–1	Asyut Cement
14:00

23 January 2023	Asyut Petroleum	3–0	Tamiya
14:00

23 January 2023	Minya	1–3	Misr Lel Makkasa
14:00

23 January 2023	Telephonat Beni Suef	2–1	Dayrout
14:00

24 January 2023	Nogoom	1–0	Al Nasr	Salmaniya Club Stadium
14:00

26 January 2023	Telecom Egypt	3–1	Tersana SC	Cairo
14:00				Stadium: Al Salam Stadium

24 January 2023	Al Obour	2–0	Al Tayaran	Al Obour Club stadium
14:00

24 January 2023	Wadi Degla	1–1 (2–4 p)	El Sekka El Hadid	Cairo
14:00	Omar Adly		Mustafa Abdel Wahhab	Stadium: Osman Ahmed Osman Stadium

23 January 2023	El Entag El Harby	0–0 (4–5 p)	ZED	Cairo
14:00				Stadium: Al Salam Stadium

24 January 2023	Eastern Company	0–2	Alo Egypt	Giza
14:00				Stadium: Eastern Company Stadium

24 January 2023	El Marg	2–0	Gomhoriat Shebin
14:00

24 January 2023	Porto Suez	3–0	Markaz Shabab Al-Sarw	Cairo
14:00				Stadium: Police Academy Stadium

23 January 2023	Suez	2–2	Kahrabaa Ismailia
14:00

24 January 2023	El Qanah	0–1	Petrojet	Suez
14:00				Stadium: Suez Canal Stadium

El Sharkia	bye

22 January 2023	Pioneers	0–0 (2–4 p)	Dikernis
14:00

22 January 2023	MS Minyat Samanoud	1–1 (2–4 p)	Minyat Al Nasr
14:00

22 January 2023	El Mansoura	1–0	Ittihad Nabarouh	Mansoura
14:00	58' (o.g.)			Stadium: El Mansoura Stadium

22 January 2023	Baladeyet El Mahalla	2–3	Raya Ghazl Kafr El Dawar	El Mahalla El Kubra
14:00

22 January 2023	Sporting Castle	2–0	Tanta
14:00	Adel Abdel Maqsoud; Saad Saleh

22 January 2023	Kafr El Sheikh	0–1	Proxy
14:00			Hossam Greisha

22 January 2023	Sporting Alexandria	1–1 (4–2 p)	Al Magd
14:00

22 January 2023	Olympic Club	2–4	Al Hammam
14:00	Youssef Babio; Elio Padra		Amouri; Abdullah Sorour; Ahmed Makkawi

22 January 2023	Fleet Club	1–0	Al Hilal (El Dabaa)
14:00

22 January 2023	Salloum	1–1 (1–3 p)	Abou Qir Fertilizers
14:00

=== Fourth preliminary round ===
The draw took place on 25 January 2023.

26 January 2023	Dikernis	0–0 (5–4 p)	Minyat Al Nasr	Bani Ebeid
14:00				Stadium: Bani Ebeid Stadium; Referee: Uday Eid

26 January 2023	Sporting Castle	1–2	Proxy	Qutour Youth Center
14:00	Goal		Hossam Barakat 53'; Kamel Ahmed 90+6'

26 January 2023	El Mansoura	1–2	Raya Ghazl Kafr El Dawar	Mansoura
14:00	Ahmed Al-Awadi 45+3'		Mohamed Hassan; Karim Magdy (pen.)	Stadium: El Mansoura Stadium

26 January 2023	Fleet Club	1–1 (3–2 p)	Abou Qir Fertilizers	Naval Forces Stadium
14:00

28 January 2023	La Viena	4–0	Asyut Cement	Assiut
14:00	Mohamed Ramadan 9' (pen.); Abdel-Rahman Aboud 39', 59'; Qassem Rabie 90+'	Report		Stadium: Al Assiouty Sport Stadium; Referee: Mohamed Nasser Abbas

28 January 2023	Asyut Petroleum	2–0	Misr Lel Makkasa
14:00	Fawzi Al-Kashef 48'; Islam Salah			Referee: Haitham Othman

28 January 2023	Porto Suez	0–0 (4–5 p)	Suez
14:00				Referee: Yahya Nabo

28 January 2023	Petrojet	1–2	El Sharkia	Cairo
14:00	Goal		Ahmed Bali; Al-Sayed Mustafa	Stadium: Petrosport Stadium; Referee: Islam Al-Qamash

29 January 2023	Telephonat Beni Suef	2–2 (1–3 p)	Nogoom	Assiut
14:00				Stadium: Al Assiouty Sport Stadium

29 January 2023	El Sekka El Hadid	2–2 (7–6 p)	ZED	Cairo
14:00				Stadium: El Sekka El Hadid Stadium

30 January 2023	Al Obour	1–1 (4–5 p)	Telecom Egypt

31 January 2023	Muslim Youths (Qena)	1–1 (7–6 p)	KIMA Aswan	Qena
14:00	80'			Stadium: Muslim Youth Stadium

31 January 2023	Alo Egypt	3–0	El Marg
14:00

31 January 2023	Sporting Alexandria	0–0 (2–4 p)	Al Hammam	Sporting
14:00

=== Round of 32 ===
All Egyptian Premier League clubs enter the competition from this round. The matches were scheduled to take place between 16 and 20 March 2023, but were later postponed due to the desire to play the last season's final first. The draw was held on 1 May 2023, with matches scheduled to take place from 7 to 11 May 2023. Four matches were postponed from this round for different reasons.

Alo Egypt, Fleet Club, Nogoom, Raya Ghazl Kafr El Dawar and El Sharkia are the lowest ranked teams remaining in the competition; all participating in the 2022–23 Egyptian Third Division.

All times are CAST (UTC+3).

7 May 2023	Smouha (1)	2–1	Alo Egypt (3)	Alexandria
18:00	Faisal 51'; Mostafa 75'	Report	Soliman 16'	Stadium: Alexandria Stadium; Referee: Mohamed Abdel Aziz

7 May 2023	El Dakhleya (1)	2–2 (a.e.t.) (4–3 p)	Aswan (1)	Cairo
18:00	Kyambadde 21'; Talaat 68'	Report	Gamal 45+1'; Abdel Rasoul 90+4'	Stadium: Petrosport Stadium; Referee: Abdel Rahman Saleh
	Penalties
	Fekri (penalty missed); Mostafa (penalty scored); Nosseir (penalty scored); Talaat (penalty scored); Ramadan (penalty scored)		(penalty scored) Gamal; (penalty missed) Fahmy; (penalty scored) Morsy; (penalty scored) Saoudi; (penalty missed) Hamdi

7 May 2023	Ceramica Cleopatra (1)	5–0	Dikernis (2)	Cairo
21:00	Gaber 9'; Rayyan 45+3' (pen.); Ramadan 53'; Gamal 59' (o.g.); Wayou 90+3'	Report		Stadium: Cairo International Stadium; Referee: Mostafa Medhat

8 May 2023	National Bank of Egypt (1)	3–2	Muslim Youths (Qena) (2)	Cairo
18:00	Diawara 45+3'; Sadek 54' (o.g.); Kaoud 59'	Report	Ahmed 30'; Hashem 87' (pen.)	Stadium: Cairo International Stadium; Referee: Mahmoud Mansour

8 May 2023	ENPPI (1)	3–0	La Viena (2)	Cairo
18:00	Amin 45'; El Agouz 70' (pen.); Galal 90+2'	Report		Stadium: Petrosport Stadium; Referee: Islam El Kamash

8 May 2023	Al Masry (1)	3–1	Asyut Petroleum (2)	Alexandria
21:00	Attia 34'; Omran 38', 89'	Report	Sabry 4'	Stadium: Borg El Arab Stadium; Referee: Amr El Shenawy

8 May 2023	Al Mokawloon Al Arab (1)	4–0	Al Hammam (2)	Cairo
21:00	Okoli 20' (pen.); Fathy 40'; Hassan 88'; Salem 90+1'	Report		Stadium: Osman Ahmed Osman Stadium; Referee: Mahmoud Hussein

9 May 2023	Zamalek (1)	3–2 (a.e.t.)	Proxy (2)	Cairo
18:00	Mohamed 42'; Mathlouthi 78'; Jaziri 99'	Report	Ahmed 7'; Gomaa 56' (pen.)	Stadium: Cairo International Stadium; Referee: Walid Abdel Razek

9 May 2023	Al Ittihad (1)	2–0 (a.e.t.)	El Sekka El Hadid (2)	Alexandria
21:00	Adal 98' (o.g.); Hassan 118'	Report		Stadium: Alexandria Stadium; Referee: Amr El Attar

10 May 2023	Pharco (1)	1–0	Telecom Egypt (2)	Alexandria
18:00	Sherif 25'	Report		Stadium: Borg El Arab Stadium; Referee: Abou Bakr Abdel Hai

10 May 2023	Future (1)	4–1	Fleet Club (3)	Cairo
21:00	Mohsen 1', 5', 37' (pen.); Sfaxi 55'	Report	Atito 70'	Stadium: Al Salam Stadium; Referee: El Sayed Mounir

11 May 2023	Tala'ea El Gaish (1)	3–0	El Sharkia (3)	Cairo
19:00	Samir 60'; Mohareb 90+2'; Halawa 90+4'	Report		Stadium: Gehaz El Reyada Stadium; Referee: Haitham Osman

17 May 2023 (Note: The Pyramids v Raya Ghazl Kafr El Dawar match, originally scheduled to be played between 7 and 11 May 2023, was postponed to avoid scheduling conflicts with Raya Ghazl Kafr El Dawar's fixtures in the 2022–23 Egyptian Third Division promotion play-offs.)	Pyramids (1)	2–0	Raya Ghazl Kafr El Dawar (3)	Cairo
18:00	M. Fathi 15', 85'	Report		Stadium: 30 June Stadium; Referee: Hosny Sultan

24 May 2023 (Note: The Ismaily v Nogoom match, originally scheduled to be played between 7 and 11 May 2023, was postponed to avoid scheduling conflicts with Nogoom's fixtures in the 2022–23 Egyptian Third Division promotion play-offs.)	Ismaily (1)	0–2	Nogoom (3)	Ismailia
18:00		Report	Hammam 66'; Alaa El Din 82'	Stadium: Ismailia Stadium; Referee: Mohamed Taha

28 May 2023 (Note: The Haras El Hodoud v Ghazl El Mahalla match, originally scheduled to be played between 7 and 11 May 2023, was postponed to for an unannounced reason.)	Haras El Hodoud (1)	3–2	Ghazl El Mahalla (1)	Alexandria
19:00	Ben Wali 9'; Abdel Hakim 18', 69'	Report	Orok 15', 22'	Stadium: Haras El Hodoud Stadium; Referee: Mahmoud Nassef

25 June 2023 (Note: The Al Ahly v Suez match, originally scheduled to be played between 7 and 11 May 2023, was postponed to avoid scheduling conflicts with Al Ahly's fixtures in the 2022–23 CAF Champions League.)	Al Ahly (1)	1–0	Suez (2)	Cairo
20:30	El Shahat 87'	Report		Stadium: Cairo International Stadium; Referee: Hesham El Fallal

=== Round of 16 ===
The draw for this round was held on 1 May 2023, after the round of 32 draw, with matches originally scheduled to take place from 22 to 24 June 2023. Two matches were postponed from this round, and one was played ahead of the original schedule.

Nogoom are the lowest ranked team remaining in the competition; who are participating in the 2022–23 Egyptian Third Division.

All times are CAST (UTC+3).

28 May 2023 (Note: The ENPPI v Future match, originally scheduled to be played between 22 and 24 June 2023, was played ahead of the planned schedule as both teams were available to play as they did not have any matches scheduled in that period.)	ENPPI (1)	1–1 (a.e.t.) (6–5 p)	Future (1)	Cairo
21:30	Kalosha 90+21' (pen.)	Report	Reda 57'	Stadium: Petrosport Stadium; Referee: Nader Kamar El Dawla
	Penalties
	Hawash (penalty scored); Amin (penalty scored); Hamdy (penalty scored); El Agouz (penalty scored); Kalosha (penalty scored); Dawoud (penalty scored)		(penalty scored) Reda; (penalty scored) Kamal; (penalty scored) El Said; (penalty scored) Barry; (penalty scored) El Fil; (penalty missed) Atef

22 June 2023	Al Ittihad (1)	0–1	Pyramids (1)	Alexandria
18:30		Report	Ben Youssef 90+5'	Stadium: Alexandria Stadium; Referee: Mohamed Youssef

22 June 2023	Al Mokawloon Al Arab (1)	1–0	Ceramica Cleopatra (1)	Cairo
21:30	Hinestroza 74'	Report		Stadium: Osman Ahmed Osman Stadium; Referee: Ahmed Gamal

23 June 2023	Tala'ea El Gaish (1)	1–1 (a.e.t.) (7–8 p)	National Bank of Egypt (1)	Cairo
18:30	Tarek 10'	Report	Yasser 89'	Stadium: Gehaz El Reyada Stadium; Referee: Sobhy El Amrawy
	Penalties
	Wadi (penalty scored); Sherif (penalty missed); Mohareb (penalty missed); Halawa (penalty scored); Meteb (penalty scored); Stouhi (penalty scored); Fathallah (penalty scored); Hamdy (penalty scored); Radwan (penalty scored); Wadi (penalty missed)		(penalty missed) Simporé; (penalty scored) Bambo; (penalty scored) Bassiouny; (penalty missed) El Sayed; (penalty scored) Helal; (penalty scored) El Gazzar; (penalty scored) Fathy; (penalty scored) Yakubu; (penalty scored) Abou Gabal; (penalty scored) Helal

23 June 2023	Zamalek (1)	3–1	Pharco (1)	Cairo
21:30	Sayed 20' (pen.); Shalaby 45+6'; Abou El Fotouh 88'	Report	Gamal 47'	Stadium: Cairo International Stadium; Referee: Tarek Magdy

24 June 2023	Nogoom (3)	1–0	Smouha (1)	Alexandria (Note: The Nogoom v Smouha match, originally scheduled to be played at El Sekka El Hadid Stadium in Cairo, was moved to Alexandria Stadium in Alexandria, home of Smouha, due to VAR unavailability in the stadium.)
18:30	Alaa El Din 67'	Report		Stadium: Alexandria Stadium; Referee: Mahmoud Wafa

6 July 2023 (Note: The Al Masry v Haras El Hodoud match, originally scheduled to be played between 22 and 24 June 2023, was postponed to avoid scheduling conflict with a postponed fixture involving Haras El Hodoud in the 2022–23 Egyptian Premier League.)	Al Masry (1)	3–2 (a.e.t.)	Haras El Hodoud (1)	Alexandria
20:30	Yehia 46'; Jelassi 90' (pen.); Etouga 114'	Report	Valentine 36'; David 59'	Stadium: Borg El Arab Stadium; Referee: Ahmed Hamdy

30 July 2023 (Note: The Al Ahly v El Dakhleya match, originally scheduled to be played between 22 and 24 June 2023, was postponed as Al Ahly's participation in the match was not determined by the time of the fixture, due to the postponement of their match in the round of 32.)	Al Ahly (1)	2–0	El Dakhleya (1)	Cairo
19:00	Tau 38'; Magdy 90+2'	Report		Stadium: Cairo Military Academy Stadium; Referee: Mohamed Youssef

=== Quarter-finals ===
The draw for this round was held on 1 May 2023, after the previous rounds' draw, with matches originally scheduled to take place on 3 and 4 July 2023. One match was postponed from this round.

Nogoom are the lowest ranked team remaining in the competition; who are participating in the 2022–23 Egyptian Third Division.

All times are CAST (UTC+3).

3 July 2023	National Bank of Egypt (1)	0–3	Pyramids (1)	Cairo
20:30		Report	Issa 3', 60'; Lakay 45+7' (pen.)	Stadium: Cairo International Stadium; Referee: Mahmoud Bassiouny

4 July 2023	Nogoom (3)	1–3	ENPPI (1)	Cairo
18:00	Gamal 22'	Report	Emad 14'; El Khashab 52'; Kalosha 70'	Stadium: Petrosport Stadium; Referee: Walid Abdel Razek

4 July 2023	Zamalek (1)	6–1	Al Mokawloon Al Arab (1)	Cairo
20:30	Sayed 17' (pen.), 40'; Jaziri 41', 51', 57'; Shikabala 54'	Report	Farid 76'	Stadium: Cairo International Stadium; Referee: Mohamed Maarouf

3 August 2023 (Note: The Al Ahly v Al Masry match, originally scheduled to be played on 3 or 4 July 2023, was postponed as both participating teams in the match were not determined yet by the time of the fixture.)	Al Ahly (1)	2–1 (a.e.t.)	Al Masry (1)	Alexandria
18:00	Maâloul 90+10' (pen.); Kendouci 108'	Report	Hamdy 90+5'	Stadium: Borg El Arab Stadium; Referee: Abdel Aziz El Sayed

=== Semi-finals ===
The draw for this round was held on 1 May 2023, after the previous rounds' draw. No designated dates were announced for this round.

All remaining teams are members of the 2022–23 Egyptian Premier League.

All times are CAST (UTC+3).

4 October 2023	Al Ahly (1)	3–0	ENPPI (1)	Cairo
19:00	Maâloul 33' (pen.); Modeste 51'; Ashour 86'	Report		Stadium: Cairo International Stadium; Referee: Tarek Magdy

8 November 2023	Zamalek (1)	3–3 (a.e.t.) (4–3 p)	Pyramids (1)	Cairo
19:00	Emad 90+2'; Akinyoola 101'; Mansi 112'	Report	Mayele 5'; Fathi 92'; Hamdy 108'	Stadium: Cairo International Stadium; Referee: Ahmad Al-Ghandour
	Penalties
	Mathlouthi (penalty scored); Ashraf (penalty missed); Gomaa (penalty scored); Mansi (penalty scored); Zizo (penalty scored)		(penalty scored) El Said; (penalty scored) Sobhi; (penalty scored) Hafez; (penalty missed) Samy; (penalty missed) Fathi

=== Final ===
8 March 2024
20:30 AST

Zamalek	0–2	Al Ahly
	Report	Ashour 84'; Afsha 90+4'

Al-Awwal Park, Riyadh
Referee: Anderson Daronco (Brazil)

== Bracket ==
The following is the bracket which the Egypt Cup resembles. Numbers in parentheses next to the match score represent the results of a penalty shoot-out.

Round of 32; 7 May – 25 June 2023
Zamalek (a.e.t.)	3
Proxy	2
Pharco	1
Telecom Egypt	0
Al Mokawloon Al Arab	4
Al Hammam	0
Ceramica Cleopatra	5
Dikernis	0
Tala'ea El Gaish	3
El Sharkia	0
National Bank of Egypt	3
Muslim Youths (Qena)	2
Al Ittihad (a.e.t.)	2
El Sekka El Hadid	0
Pyramids	2
Raya Ghazl Kafr El Dawar	0
Al Ahly	1
Suez	0
El Dakhleya (p)	2 (5)
Aswan	2 (4)
Al Masry	3
Asyut Petroleum	1
Haras El Hodoud	3
Ghazl El Mahalla	2
Ismaily	0
Nogoom	2
Smouha	2
Alo Egypt	1
ENPPI	3
La Viena	0
Future	4
Fleet Club	1

Round of 16; 28 May – 30 July 2023
Zamalek	3
Pharco	1
Al Mokawloon Al Arab	1
Ceramica Cleopatra	0
Tala'ea El Gaish	1 (7)
National Bank of Egypt (p)	1 (8)
Al Ittihad	0
Pyramids	1
Al Ahly	2
El Dakhleya	0
Al Masry (a.e.t.)	3
Haras El Hodoud	2
Nogoom	1
Smouha	0
ENPPI (p)	1 (6)
Future	1 (5)

Quarter-finals; 3 July – 3 August 2023
Zamalek	6
Al Mokawloon Al Arab	1
National Bank of Egypt	0
Pyramids	3
Al Ahly (a.e.t.)	2
Al Masry	1
Nogoom	1
ENPPI	3

Semi-finals; 4 October - 8 November 2023
Zamalek	3 (4)
Pyramids	3 (3)
Al Ahly	3
ENPPI	0

Final; 8 March 2024
Zamalek	0
Al Ahly	2

== Top scorers ==
Rank	Player	Club	Goals
1	(Tunisia) Seifeddine Jaziri	Zamalek	4
2	(Egypt) Marwan Mohsen	Future	3
2	(Egypt) Ahmed Sayed	Zamalek	3
4	(Egypt) Wagih Abdel Hakim	Haras El Hodoud	2
4	(Egypt) Nour Alaa El Din	Nogoom	2
4	(Egypt) Mostafa Fathi	Pyramids	2
4	(Egypt) Islam Issa	Pyramids	2
4	(Egypt) Ahmed Kalosha	ENPPI	2
4	(Egypt) Ragab Omran	Al Masry	2
4	(Nigeria) Gabriel Orok	Ghazl El Mahalla	2
