= 2023 Egypt Cup final =

- Event: 2022–23 Egypt Cup
Zamalek	Al Ahly
0	2
- Date: 8 March 2024
- Venue: Al-Awwal Park, Riyadh, Saudi Arabia
- Man of the Match: Emam Ashour (Al Ahly)
- Referee: Anderson Daronco (Brazil)

The 2023 Egypt Cup final was a one-legged football tie that would determine the winner of the 2022–23 Egypt Cup competition. During which Al Ahly, the holder of the 2022 edition title, and Zamalek, competed. The match was held at Al-Awwal Park in Riyadh, Saudi Arabia.

On 12 February 2024, the Egyptian Football Association announced its approval of Saudi Arabia's request to host the cup final. Tickets went on sale on 26 February 2024.

Al Ahly beat Zamalek 2–0 to secure their 39th title in the history of the tournament.

== Route to the final ==
Note: In all results below, the score of the finalist is given first.

Zamalek		Round	Al Ahly	
Opponent	Result	2022–23 Egypt Cup	Opponent	Result
Proxy	3–2 (a.e.t.)	Round of 32	Suez	1–0
Pharco	3–1	Round of 16	El Dakhleya	2–0
Al Mokawloon Al Arab	6–1	Quarter-finals	Al Masry	2–1 (a.e.t.)
Pyramids	3–3 (a.e.t.) (4–3 p)	Semi-finals	ENPPI	3–0

== Match ==
=== Details ===
8 March 2024
20:30 AST

Zamalek	0–2	Al Ahly
	Report	Ashour 84'; Afsha 90+4'

Al-Awwal Park, Riyadh
Referee: Anderson Daronco (Brazil)

Zamalek	Al Ahly

GK	1	(Egypt) Mohamed Awad
RB	4	(Egypt) Omar Gaber (c)
CB	24	(Tunisia) Hamza Mathlouthi
CB	2	(Egypt) Hossam Abdul-Majeed
LB	13	(Egypt) Ahmed Fatouh
DM	8	(Egypt) Nabil Emad Dunga	(yellow card) 82'
CM	14	(Egypt) Youssef Obama		(substituted off) 59'
CM	19	(Egypt) Abdallah El Said		(substituted off) 90'
RW	25	(Egypt) Zizo		(substituted off) 46'
CF	9	(Egypt) Nasser Mansi		(substituted off) 59'
LW	11	(Egypt) Mostafa Shalaby	(yellow card) 37'
Substitutes:
GK	16	(Egypt) Mohamed Sobhy
DF	6	(Egypt) Mostafa El Zenary
DF	20	(Egypt) Mahmoud Alaa
MF	5	(Egypt) Ahmed Hamdi
MF	10	(Egypt) Shikabala		(substituted on) 46'
MF	12	(Egypt) Mohamed Ashraf
MF	22	(Egypt) Nasser Maher		(substituted on) 59'
FW	23	(Benin) Samson Akinyoola		(substituted on) 90'
FW	30	(Tunisia) Seifeddine Jaziri		(substituted on) 59'
Manager:
(Portugal) José Gomes

GK	31	(Egypt) Mostafa Shobeir
RB	30	(Egypt) Mohamed Hany
CB	5	(Egypt) Ramy Rabia (c)
CB	24	(Egypt) Mohamed Abdelmonem
LB	21	(Tunisia) Ali Maâloul
DM	17	(Egypt) Amr El Solia	(yellow card) 67'	(substituted off) 74'
CM	20	(Egypt) Karim Nedved		(substituted off) 73'
CM	22	(Egypt) Emam Ashour	(yellow card) 84'
RW	10	(South Africa) Percy Tau		(substituted off) 73'
CF	7	(Egypt) Kahraba		(substituted off) 90+3'
LW	14	(Egypt) Hussein El Shahat		(substituted off) 90+3'
Substitutes:
GK	25	(Egypt) Mahmoud El Zanfaly
DF	3	(Egypt) Omar Kamal		(substituted on) 73'
DF	28	(Egypt) Karim Fouad
MF	8	(Egypt) Akram Tawfik		(substituted on) 90+3'
MF	13	(Egypt) Marwan Attia		(substituted on) 73'
MF	19	(Egypt) Afsha		(substituted on) 74'	(yellow card) 90+5'
FW	12	(Morocco) Reda Slim
FW	27	(France) Anthony Modeste		(substituted on) 90+3'
FW	29	(Egypt) Taher Mohamed
Manager:
(Switzerland) Marcel Koller

Man of the Match:
Emam Ashour (Al Ahly)

Assistant referees:
Neuza Back (Brazil)
Fabrini Bevilaqua (Brazil)
Fourth official:
Rodrigo Pereira (Brazil)
Video assistant referee:
Charly Wendy (Brazil)
Assistant video assistant referee:
Thayslane Costa (Brazil)

Match rules

- 90 minutes.
- 30 minutes of extra time if necessary.
- Penalty shoot-out if scores still level.
