= Ahmed Koka =

Ahmed Koka may refer to:

- Ahmed Nabil Koka
- Ahmed Hassan Koka
