= Adel Gamal =

Emirati footballer

Adel Jamal
Personal information
- Full name: Adel Jamal Abdullah Saleh
- Date of birth: 1 January 1993 (age 33)
- Height: 1.73 m (5 ft 8 in)
- Position: Midfielder

Youth career
- 2015–2017: Al-Ain

Senior career*
Years	Team	Apps	(Gls)
2017–2018	Santa Clara	3	(0)
2018–2019	Sharjah	0	(0)
2019–2020	Khor Fakkan	2	(0)
- * Club domestic league appearances and goals as of 26 March 2017

Adel Jamal Abdullah Saleh (born 1 January 1993) Yemeni professional footballer who plays as a midfielder.

== Club career ==
He made his professional debut in the Segunda Liga for Santa Clara on 19 March 2017 in a game against Braga B.
