= KingFut =

English-language Egyptian sports website

- Screenshot Screenshot of KingFut home page, as it appeared on 16 August 2016.
- Website type: Sports journalism
- Available in: English
- Owners: Adam Moustafa (co-founder); Mohamed Seif (co-founder and chief commercial officer); Moustafa El-Chiati (co-founder)
- Website: www.kingfut.com
- Registration: None
- Launched: 13 July 2012; 14 years ago
- Current status: Online

KingFut is an English-language Egyptian website providing a variety of news and statistics for sports in Egypt, mostly focused on football in Egypt and news on Egyptian expatriate footballers.

== History ==
The website was launched on 13 July 2012 by three young Egyptian journalists, Adam Moustafa, Mohamed Seif, and Moustafa El-Chiati, as an English-language news source covering Egyptian football.

Since May 2015, KingFut includes handball and squash news.

On 26 May 2016, a partnership with Juventus was announced.

On 13 August 2016, KingFut was appointed by Premier League club Stoke City to manage its official Arabic social media accounts and digital media presence across different platforms, just two weeks after the English club announced the signing of Egypt's footballer Ramadan Sobhi. This move was part of the English club's strategy to expand its international reach and communicate with Arabic speaking fans in Western Asia, Northern Africa and the Arab diaspora.
