= 2025 Egyptian Super Cup =

Egyptian football competition

Egyptian Super Cup

Tournament details
- Host country: UAE
- Cities: Abu Dhabi, Al Ain
- Dates: 6–9 November 2025
- Teams: 4

Final positions
- Champions: Al Ahly (16th title)
- Runners-up: Zamalek
- Third place: Ceramica Cleopatra
- Fourth place: Pyramids

Tournament statistics
- Matches played: 4
- Goals scored: 8 (2 per match)
- Top scorer(s): Ahmed Belhadji (2 goals)

The 2025 Egyptian Super Cup, officially the National Bank Of Egypt Egyptian Super Cup for sponsorship purposes, was the 23rd edition of the Egyptian Super Cup, an annual football competition contested by teams that were successful in the preceding season of Egyptian football.

Al Ahly were the defending champions. They successfully defended their title after beating Zamalek 2–0, winning five tournaments in a row and a record-extending 16th Egyptian Super Cup title.

== Format ==
The tournament consists of four teams: the winners of all three major football competitions in Egypt from the preceding season (Egyptian Premier League, Egypt Cup and Egyptian League Cup), while the fourth team is invited by receiving a 'golden card' from the Egyptian Football Association.

Fixtures were announced in October 2025.

=== Qualified teams ===
The following four teams qualified for the tournament.

Team	Method of qualification
Al Ahly	2024–25 Egyptian Premier League winners
Zamalek	2024–25 Egypt Cup winners
Ceramica Cleopatra	2024–25 Egyptian League Cup winners
Pyramids	Golden card recipient

== Bracket ==
Semi-finals
6 November 2025
Al Ahly	2
Ceramica Cleopatra	1
6 November 2025
Pyramids	0 (4)
Zamalek	0 (5)

Final
9 November 2025
Al Ahly	2
Zamalek	0
Third place match
9 November 2025
Ceramica Cleopatra	2
Pyramids	1

== Matches ==
All times are GST (UTC+4).

=== Semi-finals ===
6 November 2025	Al Ahly	2–1	Ceramica Cleopatra	Al Ain
19:00	Trezeguet 19'; Gradišar 52'	Report	Otaka 41'	Stadium: Hazza bin Zayed Stadium; Referee: Mahmoud El Banna (Egypt)

6 November 2025	Zamalek	0–0 (5–4 p)	Pyramids	Abu Dhabi
21:30		Report		Stadium: Al Nahyan Stadium; Referee: Mohamed Maarouf (Egypt)
	Penalties
	El Said (penalty scored); El Wensh (penalty scored); Maher (penalty scored); Shehata (penalty scored); Jaziri (penalty scored)		(penalty scored) Hamdi; (penalty scored) Ewerton; (penalty scored) Magdy; (penalty scored) El Karti; (penalty missed) Ziko

=== Third place match ===
9 November 2025	Ceramica Cleopatra	2–1	Pyramids	Abu Dhabi
16:45	Belhadji 33' (pen.), 49' (pen.)	Report	Ziko 44'	Stadium: Al Nahyan Stadium; Referee: Omar al-Ali (UAE)

=== Final ===
9 November 2025	Al Ahly	2–0	Zamalek	Abu Dhabi
19:30	Bencharki 44'; Attia 72'	Report		Stadium: Mohammed bin Zayed Stadium; Referee: Halil Umut Meler (Turkey)

== Awards ==
Man of the Tournament	Marwan Attia	Al-Ahly FC
Best Goalkeeper	Mohamed El Shenawy	Al-Ahly FC
Top Goalscorer	Ahmed Belhadji (2 goals)	Ceramica Cleopatra FC
