= Omar Kamal =

Egyptian footballer (born 1993)

Omar Kamal عُمَر كَمَال
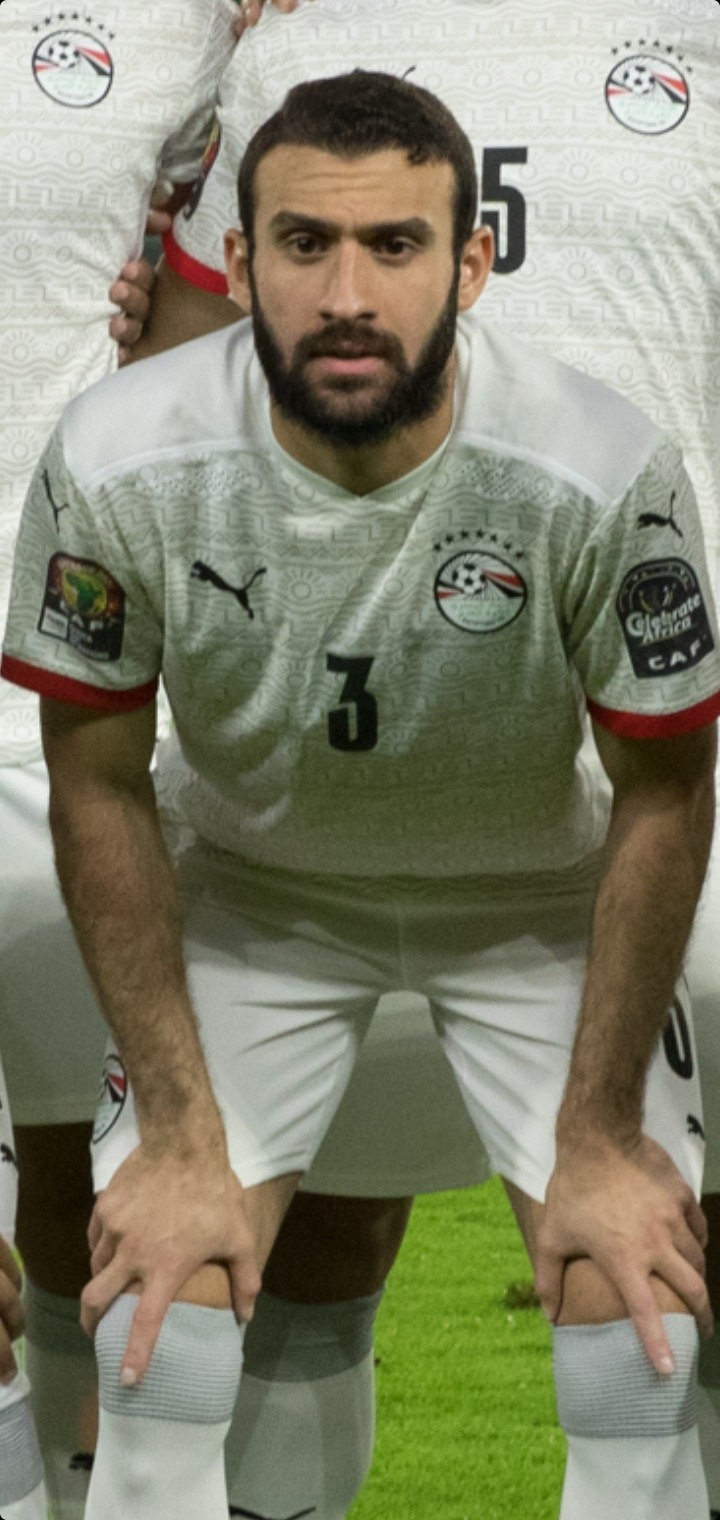
- Kamal with Egypt at the 2021 Africa Cup of Nations

Personal information
- Full name: Omar Kamal Sayed Abdelwahed
- Date of birth: 29 September 1993 (age 33)
- Place of birth: Egypt
- Height: 1.85 m (6 ft 1 in)
- Position: Right-back

Team information
- Current team: Ceramica Cleopatra FC
- Number: 3

Youth career
- Al Ahly
- Al Mokawloon Al Arab
- Nasr City Sporting Club (NCSC)
- Ittihad El Shorta

Senior career*
Years	Team	Apps	(Gls)
2012–2017	Ittihad El Shorta	43	(4)
2017–2021	Al Masry	73	(16)
2018	→ Al Assiouty Sport (loan)	13	(2)
2021	Zamalek	0	(0)
2021–2024	Future	55	(8)
2024–	Al Ahly	35	(4)
2026-	Ceramica Cleopatra FC	1	(0)

International career
2021–	Egypt	21	(1)
Medal record
Representing Egypt
Men's football
Africa Cup of Nations
Runner-up	2021 Cameroon
- * Club domestic league appearances and goals as of 11 May 2024 (UTC)

Omar Kamal Sayed Abdelwahed (Arabic: عُمَر كَمَال سَيِّد عَبْد الْوَاحِد; born 29 September 1993) is an Egyptian professional footballer who plays as a right-back for Egyptian Premier League club Ceramica Cleopatra FC on loan from Al Ahly.

== Club career ==
Kamal played for Ittihad El Shorta and had 43 appearances before moving to Al Masry and had over 70 appearances with the club.

Having played for Al Masry, Kamal joined Egyptian Premier League side Zamalek on a free transfer on 30 August 2021. However, his contract for Zamalek was immediately cancelled and he joined Future FC.

his impressive performances with Future FC earned him a call-up to the Egypt squad for the AFCON Tournament.

Kamal signed with Al Ahly and played over 30 games from 2024 to 2026 and won the African-Asian-Pacific Cup and the Egyptian Super Cup before being loaned to Ceramica Cleopatra FC.

== International career ==
He represented Egypt at the 2021 FIFA Arab Cup and the 2021 Africa Cup of Nations in which Kamal was part of the Egypt team that reached the finals of the 2021 Africa Cup of Nations but had to miss out on the final against Senegal due to suspension.

== Career statistics ==
=== Club ===
As of match played 15 March 2024

Appearances and goals by club, season and competition
Club	Season	League			National cup (Note: Includes Egypt Cup, Egyptian League Cup)		Continental		Other		Total	
Club	Season	Division	Apps	Goals	Apps	Goals	Apps	Goals	Apps	Goals	Apps	Goal
El Shorta	2012-13	Egyptian Premier League	1	0	—		—		—		1	0
El Shorta	2013-14	Egyptian Premier League	1	0	—		—		—		1	0
El Shorta	2014-15	Egyptian Premier League	15	2	2	0	—		—		17	2
El Shorta	2015-16	Egyptian Premier League	26	2	2	3	—		—		28	5
El Shorta	Total		43	4	4	3	0	0	0	0	47	7
El Masry	2017-18	Egyptian Premier League	4	0	—		—		—		4	0
Alassiouty SC (loan)	2017-18	Egyptian Premier League	13	2	2	1	—		—		15	1
El Masry	2018-19	Egyptian Premier League	10	0	—		—		—		10	0
El Masry	2019-20	Egyptian Premier League	27	3	2	0	10 (Note: Appearance(s) in CAF Confederation Cup)	0	—		39	3
El Masry	2020-21	Egyptian Premier League	32	13	3	1	—		—		35	14
El Masry	Total		73	17	7	2	10	0	0	0	103	18
Future FC	2021-22	Egyptian Premier League	29	3	2	0	—		—		31	3
Future FC	2022-23	Egyptian Premier League	19	3	1	0	7	1	—		27	4
Future FC	2023-24	Egyptian Premier League	7	2	—		5	1	—		12	3
Future FC	Total		55	8	3	0	12	2	0	0	70	10
Al Ahly	2023-24	Egyptian Premier League	10	0	—		—		—		10	0
Career Total			185	29	14	5	22	2	0	0	234	35

=== International ===
As of match played 26 March 2024

National team	Year	Apps	Goals
Egypt	2021	5	0
Egypt	2022	7 (Note: Five appearances in African Cup Of Nations)	0
Egypt	2023	5	1
Egypt	2024	4 (Note: Three appearances in the African Cup of Nations)	0
Total		21	1

List of international goals scored by Merih Demiral
No.	Date	Venue	Opponent	Score	Result	Competition
1	12 September 2023	30 June Stadium, Cairo, Egypt	Tunisia	1-3	1-3	Friendly

== Honours ==
Al Ahly

- Egypt Cup: 2022–23
- FIFA African–Asian–Pacific Cup: 2024
