= Zizo =

Egyptian footballer (born 1996)

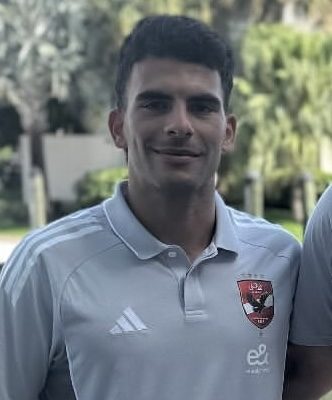
- Zizo with Al Ahly in 2025

Personal information
- Full name: Ahmed Mostafa Mohamed Sayed
- Date of birth: 10 January 1996 (age 30)
- Place of birth: Minya, Egypt
- Height: 1.75 m (5 ft 9 in)
- Position: Winger

Team information
- Current team: Al Ahly
- Number: 25

Youth career
- 2012–2013: Wadi Degla
- 2013: Lierse

Senior career*
Years	Team	Apps	(Gls)
2014–2017	Lierse	72	(4)
2017	→ Nacional (loan)	13	(2)
2017–2019	Moreirense	25	(1)
2019–2025	Zamalek	172	(61)
2025–	Al Ahly	17	(4)

International career^{‡}
2019–	Egypt	67	(5)
Medal record
Men's football
Representing Egypt
Africa Cup of Nations
Runner-up	2021 Cameroon
- * Club domestic league appearances and goals as of 27 April 2026 ‡ National team caps and goals as of 7 July 2026

Ahmed Mostafa Mohamed Sayed (Arabic: أحمد مصطفى محمد سيد; born 10 January 1996), commonly known as Ahmed Sayed Zizo (Arabic: أحمد سيد زيزو), or just Zizo (Arabic: زيزو), is an Egyptian professional footballer who plays as a winger for Egyptian Premier League club Al Ahly SC and the Egypt national team.

== Club career ==
=== Early life and career ===
Zizo made his Belgian Pro League debut at 29 March 2014 against Waasland-Beveren in a 0–2 away win in the 2013–14 season, he replaced Souleymane Diomandé after 50 minutes. He went onto make 72 appearances and score 49 goals in his first four seasons between 2014 and 2017 with Lierse. In January 2017, Sayed joined Primeira Liga side Nacional on loan, with an option to buy, for the rest of the 2016–17 season.

=== Zamalek ===
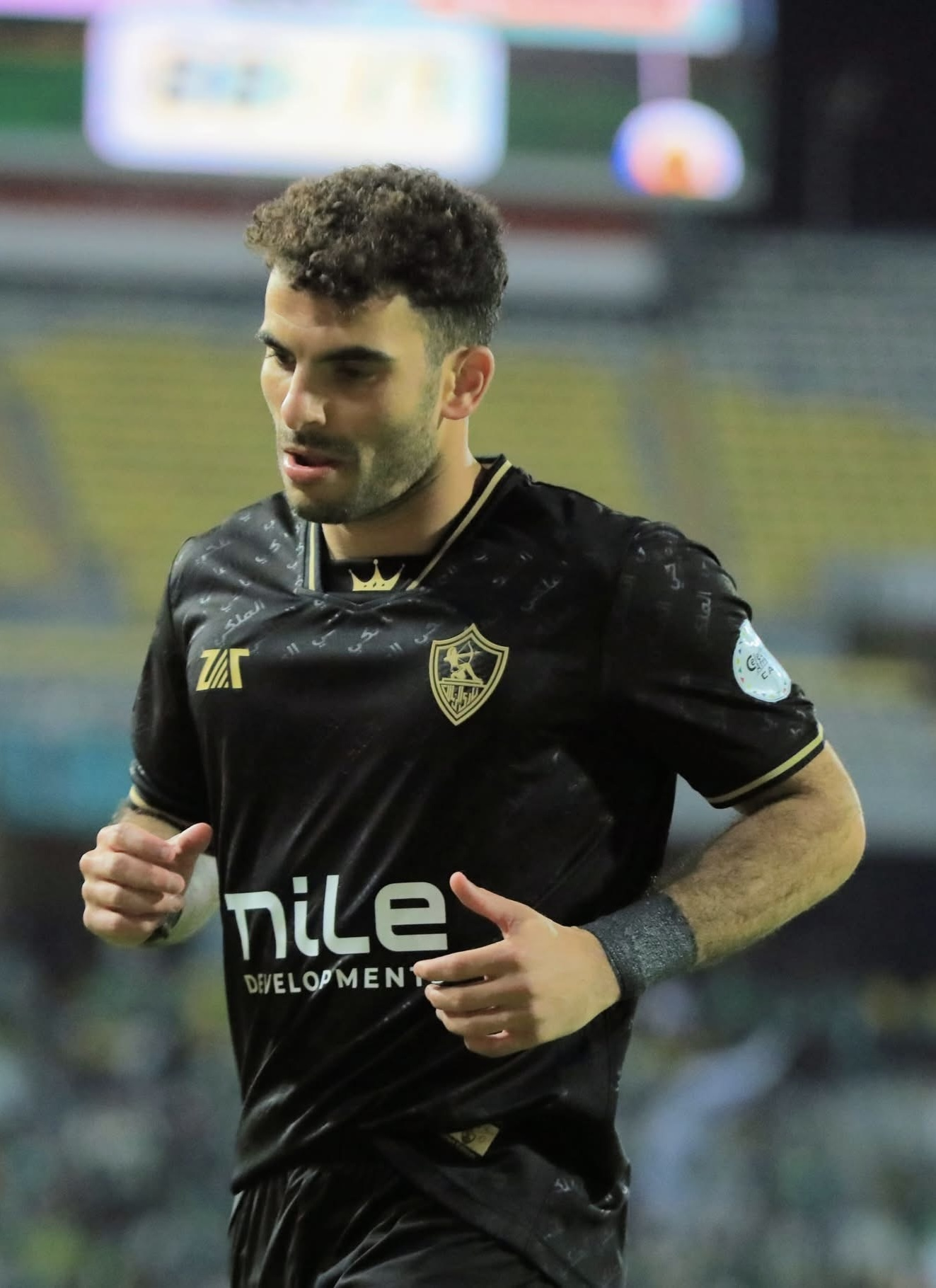
Zizo playing for Zamalek in 2025

In January 2019, Zizo returned to Egypt, signing for Zamalek, after one and a half seasons at Moreirense. Zizo played a key role in helping Zamalek secure their second consecutive Egyptian Premier League title, their first back-to-back league championships since 2004. The winger made a major contribution in both attack and defense, scoring goals, providing assists and using his versatility to influence games. Zizo finished the 2022 season as the league's top scorer and assist provider, recording 19 goals and 14 assists. His contributions accounted for more than half of Zamalek's 61 goals at that point. During the club's 13-game unbeaten run following the Cairo derby against Al Ahly, Zizo continued to produce decisive performances and helped Zamalek strengthen their position at the top of the league.

He achieved with the White Castle the Egyptian Premier League twice in (2020–21, 2021–22), the Egypt Cup in (2018–19, 2020–21, 2024–25), and the Egyptian Super Cup once in (2019–20). On the continental level, Zizo won with Zamalek the CAF Confederation Cup twice in (2018–19, 2023–24), and the CAF Super Cup twice in (2020, 2024).

=== Al Ahly ===
On 6 June 2025, it was officially announced that Zizo would join Al Ahly on a four-year deal, following the expiration of his contract with Zamalek. He became eligible to compete with Al Ahly in the 2025 FIFA Club World Cup.

Zizo won the Egyptian Super Cup: 2025 with Al Ahly against former team Zamalek delivering a strong performance throughout the 90 minutes.

== International career ==
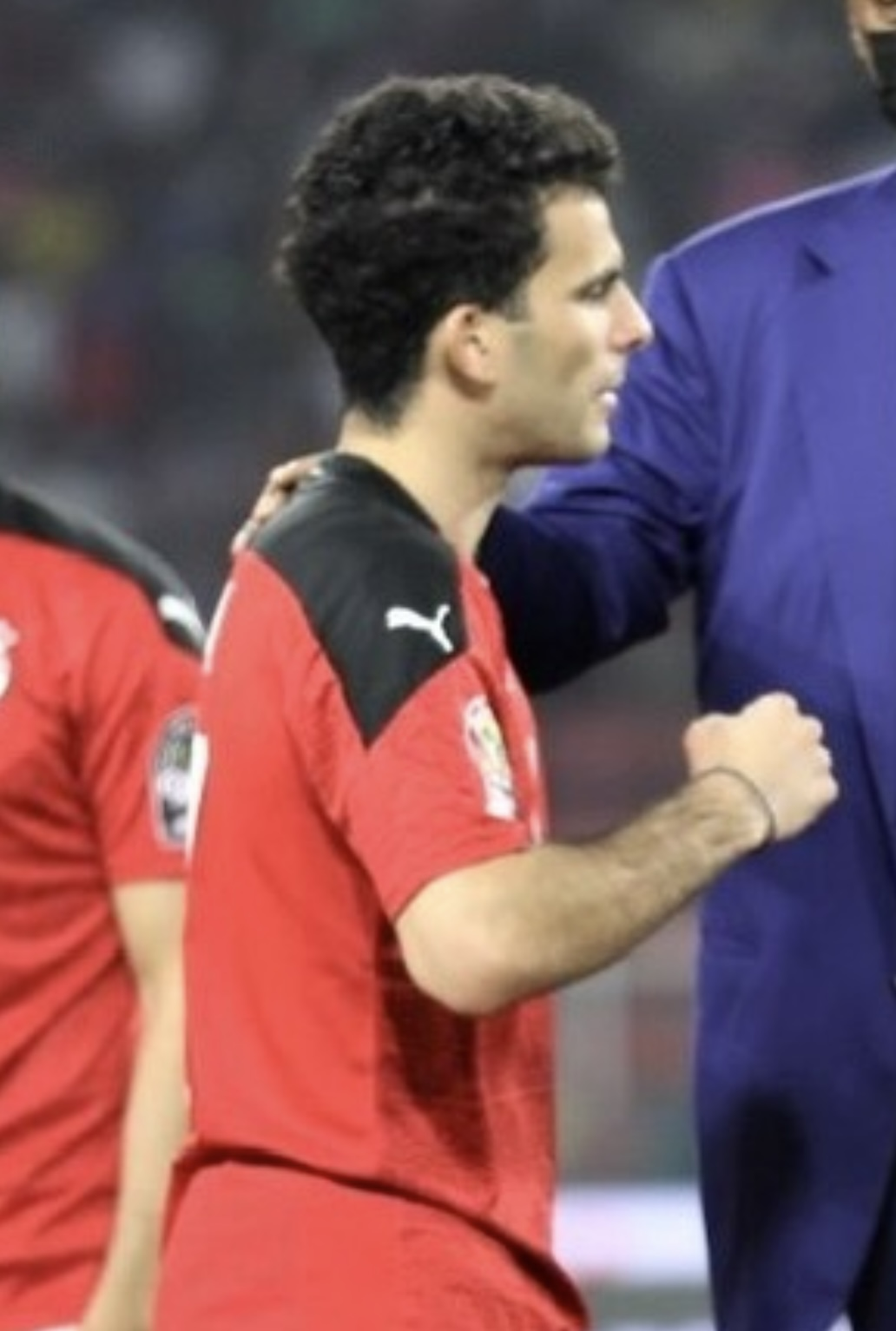
Zizo with Egypt at the 2021 Africa Cup of Nations final

On 4 December 2021, Zizo scored his first goal with the Egyptian national team during a group stage match against Sudan in the 2021 FIFA Arab Cup.

On 2 December 2025, Zizo was called up to the Egypt squad for the 2025 Africa Cup of Nations.

Zizo was included in the Egyption squad for the 2026 World Cup. Zizo played 4 games in the 2026 World Cup.

== Personal life ==
He was married on 4 August 2019, and has two daughters.

== Career statistics ==
=== Club ===
As of match played 27 February 2025

Appearances and goals by club, season and competition
Club	Season	League			National cup (Note: Includes Belgian Cup, Taça de Portugal, Egypt Cup)		Continental		Other		Total	
Club	Season	Division	Apps	Goals	Apps	Goals	Apps	Goals	Apps	Goals	Apps	Goals
Lierse	2013–14	Belgian Pro League	5	0	0	0	—		—		9	0
Lierse	2014–15	Belgian Pro League	30	2	1	0	—		—		31	2
Lierse	2015–16	Challenger Pro League	20	2	0	0	—		—		20	2
Lierse	2016–17	Challenger Pro League	17	0	1	0	—		—		18	0
Lierse	Total		72	4	2	0	0	0	0	0	74	4
Nacional (loan)	2016–17	Primeira Liga	13	2	0	0	—		—		13	2
Moreirense	2017–18	Primeira Liga	25	1	3	0	—		2 (Note: Appearances in Taça da Liga)	0	30	1
Zamalek	2018–19	Egyptian Premier League	15	1	0	0	9 (Note: Appearances in CAF Confederation Cup)	0	0	0	24	1
Zamalek	2019–20	Egyptian Premier League	26	7	4	2	13	0	2 (Note: One appearance in CAF Super Cup and one appearance in Egyptian Super Cup)	0	45	9
Zamalek	2020–21	Egyptian Premier League	33	9	4	1	5 (Note: Appearances in CAF Champions League)	0	0	0	42	10
Zamalek	2021–22	Egyptian Premier League	30	19	3	1	6	1	1 (Note: Appearance in Egyptian Super Cup)	1	40	22
Zamalek	2022–23	Egyptian Premier League	34	13	4	3	10	6	0	0	48	22
Zamalek	2023–24	Egyptian Premier League	19	9	0	0	11	4	0	0	30	13
Zamalek	2024–25	Egyptian Premier League	15	3	4	2	9	3	3 (Note: One appearance in CAF Super Cup and two appearances in Egyptian Super Cup)	0	31	8
Zamalek	Total		172	61	19	9	63	14	6	1	260	85
Career total			282	68	24	9	63	16	8	1	377	94

=== International ===
As of match played 7 July 2026

Appearances and goals by national team and year
National team	Year	Apps	Goals
Egypt	2019	3	0
Egypt	2020	2	0
Egypt	2021	8	1
Egypt	2022	13	0
Egypt	2023	10	1
Egypt	2024	10	0
Egypt	2025	11	2
Egypt	2026	10	1
Total		67	5

Scores and results list Egypt's goal tally first, score column indicates score after each Zizo goal.

List of international goals scored by Zizo
No.	Date	Venue	Opponent	Score	Result	Competition
1	4 December 2021	Stadium 974, Doha, Qatar	Sudan	2–0	5–0	2021 FIFA Arab Cup
2	28 March 2023	Bingu National Stadium, Lilongwe, Malawi	Malawi	4–0	4–0	2023 Africa Cup of Nations qualification
3	21 March 2025	Larbi Zaouli Stadium, Casablanca, Morocco	Ethiopia	2–0	2–0	2026 FIFA World Cup qualification
4	25 March 2025	Cairo International Stadium, Cairo, Egypt	Sierra Leone	1–0	1–0	2026 FIFA World Cup qualification
5	27 March 2026	King Abdullah Sports City, Jeddah, Saudi Arabia	Saudi Arabia	3–0	4–0	Friendly

== Honours ==
Zamalek

- Egyptian Premier League: 2020–21, 2021–22
- Egypt Cup: 2018–19, 2020–21, 2024–25
- Egyptian Super Cup: 2019–20
- CAF Confederation Cup: 2018–19, 2023–24
- CAF Super Cup: 2020, 2024

Al Ahly

- Egyptian Super Cup: 2025

Individual

- Egyptian Premier League top goalscorer: 2021–22
