= 2026–27 Al Ahly SC season =

Al Ahly
2026–27 season
- Chairman: Mahmoud El Khatib
- Manager: Hussein Ammouta
- Stadium: Cairo International Stadium
- Egyptian Premier League: 2nd
- Egypt Cup: Round of 16
- Egyptian League Cup: Group stage
- Egyptian Super Cup: Semi-finals
- CAF Confederation Cup: Group stage
- Top goalscorer: League: Zizo (3); All: Zizo (6)
- Biggest win: Home: Al Ahly 4–0 Kitara; Away: Petrol Asyut 0–5 Al Ahly
Home colours	Away colours	Third colours
- All statistics correct as of 29 October 2026.

The 2026–27 season is the 120th season in Al Ahly's history and the 68th consecutive season in the Premier League. In addition to the domestic league, Al Ahly competed in the Egyptian Cup, the Egyptian League Cup, the CAF Confederation Cup and the Egyptian Super Cup

== Season overview ==
=== June ===
Al Ahly entered the 2026–27 season after a disappointing 2025–26 campaign in which they finished third in the Egyptian Premier League, won only the Egyptian Super Cup, were eliminated from the Egypt Cup in the round of 32 and from the CAF Champions League at the quarter-final stage by Espérance de Tunis, and failed to progress from the group stage of the Egyptian League Cup. On 15 June 2026 the club appointed Moroccan manager Hussein Ammouta on a two-year contract, replacing Jess Thorup; he became the first non-Egyptian Arab manager in the club's history. On 30 June, Hamza Abdelkarim completed his move to Barcelona.

=== July ===
Trezeguet left the club on a free transfer to Al-Riyadh on 14 July. Ahly's pre-season preparations began with friendlies ahead of a training camp in Spain, including a 7–0 win over La Viena on 30 July.

=== August ===
Goalkeeper Mohamed Seha was loaned to Al Masry on 2 August. On 6 August, the CAF draw paired Ahly with the winner of the Muqdisho FC–Kitara tie in the second preliminary round of the CAF Confederation Cup, after a first-round bye. Ahly were due to face Barcelona in the Joan Gamper Trophy on 19 August. They began the league campaign on 23 August with a 3–2 home win over ENPPI, followed by a 2–0 away win over ZED FC on 28 August.

=== September ===
Ahly beat Smouha 1–0 on 3 September, drew 1–1 away to Al Mokawloon on 9 September, and beat Abu Qir Fertilizers 2–0 on 15 September.

=== October ===
The Egyptian League Cup began on 7 October, with Ahly, drawn in Group C, winning 5–0 away to Asyut Petroleum. On 11 October they won 2–0 away to rivals Zamalek in the league. In the Confederation Cup, Ahly came from behind to beat Uganda's Kitara 2–1 in Hoima on 17 October, then won the return leg 4–0 in Cairo on 25 October to progress 6–1 on aggregate, with Hussein El Shahat scoring twice. In the group stage draw on 28 October, Ahly were placed in Group A alongside Raja CA, ASKO Kara and Primeiro de Agosto.

=== November ===
After eight league matches, Ahly were unbeaten with six wins and two draws, having scored 15 goals and conceded 6. They sat second on 20 points, behind leaders Pyramids FC, whom they were due to host on 23 November. The Confederation Cup group stage was scheduled to open on 27–29 November with a home match against Primeiro de Agosto.

== Kit information ==
Supplier: Adidas
Main sponsor: Vodafone, Haier
Sleeve sponsor: Elano Water, GLC Paints
Back sponsor:Jetour, Shell Rimula

Home	Away	Third
Goalkeeper 1	Goalkeeper 2	Goalkeeper 3

== Management team ==
Position	Name
Head coach	(Morocco) Hussein Ammouta
Assistant coaches	(Egypt) Yasser Radwan (Morocco) Hichame Zahid
Conditioning Coach	(Morocco) Issam Armoum
Goalkeeping coach	(Netherlands) Joey Potveer
Head Analyst	(Morocco) Othmane Manekoudi
Video Analyst	(Morocco) Khalil Aghchmi
Fitness coaches	(Brazil) Renato Buscariolli

- Last updated: 7 July 2026
- Source: Al Ahly SC

== Players ==
=== First team ===
As of 22 August 2026

No.	Pos.	Nat.	Player	Date of birth (Age)	Signed in	Notes
Goalkeepers
1	GK	(Egypt)	Mohamed El Shenawy (C)	18 December 1988 (age 37)	2016	
31	GK	(Egypt)	Mostafa Shobeir	1 May 2001 (age 25)	2018	
33	GK	(Egypt)	Hamza Alaa	17 March 2000 (age 26)	2026	
Defenders
2	CB	(Egypt)	Yassin Marei	7 November 2001 (age 24)	2025	
3	CB	(Morocco)	Achraf Dari	6 May 1999 (age 27)	2024	
4	RB	(Egypt)	Ahmed Eid	1 January 2001 (age 25)	2026	
5	CB	(Egypt)	Hady Reyad	10 June 1998 (age 28)	2026	
6	CB	(Egypt)	Yasser Ibrahim	10 February 1993 (age 33)	2019	
11	LB	(Egypt)	Karim El Debes	3 June 2003 (age 23)	2022	
24	LB	(Egypt)	Tawfik Mohamed	1 January 2000 (age 26)	2026	
26	CB	(Egypt)	Amr El Gazar	22 September 1999 (age 27)	2026	
30	RB	(Egypt)	Mohamed Hany (VC)	25 January 1996 (age 30)	2014	
Midfielders
8	CM	(Egypt)	Ahmed Reda	19 December 2000 (age 25)	2025	
12	CM	(Egypt)	Akram Tawfik	8 November 1997 (age 29)	2026	
13	DM	(Egypt)	Marwan Attia	12 August 1998 (age 28)	2023	
15	CM	(Egypt)	Omar El Saaiy	1 January 2003 (age 23)	2024	
19	AM	(Egypt)	Afsha	6 March 1996 (age 30)	2019	
21	CM	(Egypt)	Ali Mahmoud	4 December 2002 (age 23)	2026	
22	CM	(Egypt)	Emam Ashour	20 February 1998 (age 28)	2023	
34	CM	(Egypt)	Kabaka	22 April 2005 (age 21)	2023	
36	DM	(Egypt)	Ahmed Koka	4 July 2001 (age 25)	2020	
Forwards
7	LW	(Egypt)	Taher Mohamed	7 March 1997 (age 29)	2020	
9	ST	(Morocco)	Soufiane Benjdida	5 September 2001 (age 25)	2026	
10	CF	(Algeria)	Monsef Bakrar	13 January 2001 (age 25)	2026	
14	LW	(Egypt)	Hussein El Shahat	21 June 1992 (age 34)	2019	
17	LW	(Morocco)	Achraf Bencharki	24 September 1994 (age 32)	2025	
18	RW	(Egypt)	Omar Moawad	14 October 2006 (age 20)	2024	
25	RW	(Egypt)	Zizo	10 January 1996 (age 30)	2025	
27	ST	(Egypt)	Aqtay Abdallah	1 June 2003 (age 23)	2026	
28	RW	(Egypt)	Karim Fouad	1 October 1999 (age 27)	2021	
29	RW	(Morocco)	Reda Slim	25 October 1999 (age 27)	2023	
32	ST	(Egypt)	Mohamed Raafat	4 July 2005 (age 21)	2024	
38	RW	(Egypt)	Mohamed Abdallah	18 October 2005 (age 21)	2023	
39	LW	(Egypt)	Mahmoud Salah	22 September 2007 (age 19)	2026	

=== Players under contract ===
No.	Pos.	Nat.	Player	Age	Signed in	Notes
20	LB	(Morocco)	Youssef Belammari	27	2026	
49	RB	(Egypt)	Ibrahim El Asyuti	21	2025	
23	RW	(Tunisia)	Mohamed Dhaoui	23	2023	

== Transfers ==
=== In ===
No.	Pos.	Player	From	Fee	Date	Source
Summer
27	FW	(Egypt) Aqtay Abdallah	(Egypt) Sharkia Enppi	€630k	7 July 2026	
21	MF	(Egypt) Ali Mahmoud	(Egypt) Sharkia Enppi	€538k	7 July 2026	
9	FW	(Morocco) Soufiane Benjdida	(Morocco) MAS Fès	€2.20m	19 July 2026	
10	FW	(Algeria) Monsef Bakrar	(Croatia) Dinamo Zagreb	€3.00m	28 July 2026	
12	MF	(Egypt) Akram Tawfik	(Qatar) Al-Shamal	Free transfer	12 August 2026	
39	FW	(Egypt) Mahmoud Salah	(Egypt) Ghazl El Mahalla	€600k	14 August 2026	
24	DF	(Egypt) Tawfik Mohamed	(Egypt) Suez Petrojet	€515k	15 August 2026	
Winter
74	MF	(Egypt) Mohamed Abdelnasser	(Egypt) Al Mokawloon Al Arab	€515k	1 January 2027	

==== Loan return ====
No.	Pos.	Player	From	Fee	Date	Source
Summer
39	FW	(Egypt) Hamza Abdelkarim	(Spain) Barçelona U19	Loan return	30 June 2026	
15	DF	(Morocco) Achraf Dari	(Sweden) Kalmar FF	Loan return	30 June 2026	
9	FW	(Slovenia) Nejc Gradisar	(Hungary) Újpest FC	Loan return	30 June 2026	
18	FW	(Tunisia) Cristo	(Tunisia) ES Sahel	Loan return	30 June 2026	
19	MF	(Egypt) Afsha	(Egypt) Ittihad Alex	Loan return	30 June 2026	
8	MF	(Egypt) Ahmed Reda	(Egypt) Bank El Ahly	Loan return	30 June 2026	
20	DF	(Egypt) Mostafa El Aash	(Egypt) Al Masry	Loan return	30 June 2026	
23	MF	(Egypt) Omar El Saaiy	(Egypt) Al Masry	Loan return	30 June 2026	
35	MF	(Egypt) Kabaka	(Egypt) ZED	Loan return	30 June 2026	
3	DF	(Egypt) Omar Kamal	(Egypt) Cleopatra	Loan return	30 June 2026	
11	DF	(Egypt) Karim El Debes	(Egypt) Cleopatra	Loan return	30 June 2026	
38	FW	(Egypt) Mohamed Abdallah	(Egypt) Cleopatra	Loan return	30 June 2026	
34	DF	(Egypt) Ahmed Abdin	(Egypt) Cleopatra	Loan return	30 June 2026	
37	GK	(Egypt) Mostafa Makhlouf	(Egypt) Modern Sport	Loan return	30 June 2026	
32	FW	(Egypt) Samir Mohamed	(Egypt) Suez Petrojet	Loan return	30 June 2026	

=== Out ===
Pos.	Player	To	Fee	Date	Source
Summer
FW	(Egypt) Hamza Abdelkarim	(Spain) Barcelona	€1.50m	30 June 2026	
MF	(Mali) Aliou Dieng	(Spain) Valencia	Free transfer	30 June 2026	
DF	(Egypt) Beckham	(Egypt) Cleopatra	End of loan	30 June 2026	
FW	(Cape Verde) Ieltsin Camões	(Norway) Tromsø	End of loan	30 June 2026	
FW	(Egypt) Marwan Otaka	(Egypt) Cleopatra	End of loan	30 June 2026	
GK	(Egypt) Mostafa Makhlouf	(Egypt) Modern Sport	Free transfer	30 June 2026	
FW	(Egypt) Trezeguet	(Saudi Arabia) Al-Riyadh	Free transfer	14 July 2026	
DF	(Egypt) Mostafa El Aash	(Egypt) Al Masry	€510k	30 July 2026	
DF	(Egypt) Mohamed Shokry	(Egypt) Al Masry	€510k	30 July 2026	
GK	(Egypt) Mohamed Seha	(Egypt) Al Masry	Loan fee: €100k	2 August 2026	
MF	(Tunisia) Mohamed Ben Romdhane	(Qatar) Al-Shamal	€695k	9 August 2026	
DF	(Egypt) Ahmed Abdin	(Egypt) Wadi Degla	Loan transfer	10 August 2026	
FW	(Slovenia) Nejc Gradisar	(Egypt) Cleopatra	Loan transfer	12 August 2026	
FW	(Egypt) Mohamed Sherif	(Iraq) Al-Zawraa	Loan transfer	14 August 2026	
DF	(Egypt) Omar Kamal	(Egypt) El Mokawloon	Free transfer	15 August 2026	
FW	(Egypt) Samir Mohamed	(Egypt) Suez Petrojet	Undisclosed	15 August 2026	
MF	(Egypt) Ibrahim Adel	(Egypt) El Mokawloon	Loan transfer	17 August 2026	
Winter

==== Out on loan ====
Pos.	Player	To	End date
FW	(Slovenia) Nejc Gradišar	(Egypt) Cleopatra	30 June 2027
FW	(Egypt) Mohamed Sherif	(Iraq) Al-Zawraa	30 June 2027
MF	(Egypt) Ibrahim Adel	(Egypt) Al Mokawloon	30 June 2027
DF	(Egypt) Ahmed Abdin	(Egypt) Wadi Degla	30 June 2027
GK	(Egypt) Mohamed Seha	(Egypt) Al Masry	30 June 2027

== Pre-season and friendlies ==
Win Draw Loss Fixtures

23 July 2026 Friendly	Al Ahly	5–1	Al Nasr	Cairo, Egypt
18:00 EET (UTC+2)	Gradišar; El Shahat; Ali Mahmoud; Aqtay			Stadium: Mokhtar El Tetsh Stadium
Note: This match was played behind closed doors.

30 July 2026 Friendly	Al Ahly	7–1	La Viena	Cairo, Egypt
18:00 EET (UTC+2)	Bencharki; K. Fouad; M. Abdallah; Gradišar; M. Sherif; Gradišar; M. Sherif			Stadium: Mokhtar El Tetsh Stadium
Note: This match was played behind closed doors.

5 August 2026 Friendly	Al Ahly	2–0	Petrol Asyut	Cairo, Egypt
18:00 EET (UTC+2)	M. Abdallah; Samir			Stadium: Mokhtar El Tetsh Stadium
Note: This match was played behind closed doors.

5 August 2026 Friendly	Al Ahly	6–2	Nogoom	Cairo, Egypt
20:00 EET (UTC+2)	M. Sherif; El Shahat; Zizo; Benjdida; K. Fouad; Kabaka			Stadium: Mokhtar El Tetsh Stadium
Note: This match was played behind closed doors.

12 August 2026 Friendly	Badalona (Spain)	0–3	(Egypt) Al Ahly	Badalona, Spain
20:00 CEST (UTC+2)			Mahmoud 60'; Aqtay 70'; Zizo 85'	Stadium: Estadi Municipal de Badalona
Note: This match was played behind closed doors.

14 August 2026 Friendly	Europa (Spain)	2–1	(Egypt) Al Ahly	Barcelona, Spain
20:00 CEST (UTC+2)			Bencharki 55'	Stadium: Nou Sardenya
Note: This match was played behind closed doors.

19 August 2026 Joan Gamper Trophy	Barcelona (Spain)	2–1	(Egypt) Al Ahly	Barcelona, Spain
20:00 CEST (UTC+2)	Abdelkarim 29'; Raphinha 45' (pen.); Gordon (penalty missed) 90+1'	Report	Zizo 51'; Eid (yellow card) 89'	Stadium: Camp Nou; Attendance: 54,224; Referee: Carlos Muñiz Ruiz (Spain)

== Competitions ==
=== Overview ===
Competition	First match	Last match	Starting round	Record							
Competition	First match	Last match	Starting round	Pld	W	D	L	GF	GA	GD	Win %
Egyptian Premier League	23 August 2026	TBD	Matchday 1	8	6	2	0	15	6	+9	75.00
Egypt Cup	7 November 2026	TBD	Round of 32	1	1	0	0	3	0	+3	100.00
Super Cup	TBD	TBD	Semi-finals	0	0	0	0	0	0	+0	—
League Cup	7 October 2026	TBD	League phase	2	2	0	0	6	0	+6	100.00
CAF Confederation Cup	17 October 2026	TBD	Round of 32	2	2	0	0	6	1	+5	100.00
Total				13	11	2	0	30	7	+23	84.62

Last updated: 7 November 2026
Source: Soccerway

=== Egyptian Premier League ===
==== Regular season ====
Pos	Team	Pld	W	D	L	GF	GA	GD	Pts	Qualification or relegation
1	Pyramids	8	8	0	0	19	4	+15	24	Qualification for the championship play-offs
2	Al Ahly	8	6	2	0	15	6	+9	20	Qualification for the championship play-offs
3	Zamalek	8	6	1	1	11	4	+7	19	Qualification for the championship play-offs
4	Ceramica Cleopatra	8	6	0	2	15	8	+7	18	Qualification for the championship play-offs
5	Al Ittihad	8	4	2	2	9	6	+3	14	Qualification for the championship play-offs

Updated to match(es) played on 16 November 2026. Source: Soccerway (regular season)
Rules for classification: 1) Points; 2) Goal difference; 3) Goals scored.

===== Results summary =====
Overall								Home						Away					
Pld	W	D	L	GF	GA	GD	Pts	W	D	L	GF	GA	GD	W	D	L	GF	GA	GD
8	6	2	0	15	6	+9	20	3	1	0	9	5	+4	3	1	0	6	1	+5

Last updated: 29 October 2026.
Source: Soccerway

===== Results by round =====
Round	1	2	3	4	5	6	7	8	9	10	11	12	13	14	15	16	17	18	19
Ground	H	A	H	A	H	A	H	A	H	A	H	A	H	A	H	A	H	H	A
Result	W	W	W	D	W	W	D	W											
Position	2	2	2	3	3	2	2	2											
Points	3	6	9	10	13	16	17	20											

Source: Soccerway
A = Away; H = Home; W = Win; D = Draw; L = Loss

===== Matches =====
23 August 2026 1	Al Ahly	3–2	Sharkia Enppi	Cairo
20:00 UTC+3	Attia 34' (yellow card) 90+6'; Zizo 69' (pen.); Afsha 90'	Report	A. Ehab 17'; M. Hamdy (penalty missed); M. Essam 24'; Temsah (yellow card) 77'	Stadium: Cairo International Stadium; Referee: Mahmoud Nagy (Egypt)

28 August 2026 2	ZED	0–2	Al Ahly	Cairo
20:00 UTC+3	A. Bakry (yellow card) 65'	Report	Bencharki 21'; Ali (yellow card) 24'; Taher 61'	Stadium: Cairo International Stadium; Referee: Mohamed Maarouf (Egypt)

3 September 2026 3	Al Ahly	1–0	Smouha	Cairo
20:00 UTC+3	Taher (yellow card) 55'; Hany (yellow card) 57'; Yasser 87'	Report	H. Hafez (yellow card) 45+3'; El Sisi (yellow card) 57'	Stadium: Cairo International Stadium; Referee: Amin Omar (Egypt)

9 September 2026 4	Al Mokawloon Al Arab	1–1	Al Ahly	Cairo
20:00 UTC+3	Dokou (yellow card) 3'; I. Gaber 38' (pen.)	Report	Zizo 58' (pen.) (yellow card) 69'	Stadium: Osman Ahmed Osman Stadium; Referee: Mahmoud Bassiouni (Egypt)

15 September 2026 5	Al Ahly	2–0	Abou Qir	Cairo
20:00 UTC+3	Zizo 18'; El Saaiy (yellow card) 42'; Attia (yellow card) 90+1'; El Shahat 90+3'	Report	Dabash (yellow card) 51'; Osha (yellow card) 77'; M. Alaa (yellow card) 81'	Stadium: Cairo International Stadium; Referee: Mohamed El Ghazi (Egypt)

11 October 2026 6	Zamalek	0–2	Al Ahly	Cairo
20:00 UTC+3	Gaber (yellow card) 70'	Report	Hany 39'; Bakrar 80'	Stadium: Cairo International Stadium; Attendance: 50,000; Referee: Rade Obrenović (Solvenia)

21 October 2026 7	Al Ahly	3–3	El Qanah	Cairo
20:00 UTC+3	El Saaiy 18'; Bencharki 43'; Dari 90+3'; El Shahat (yellow card) 90+6'	Report	Shalata 32'; Abosena 54'; Hersha (yellow card) 62'; Marei 80' (o.g.)	Stadium: Cairo International Stadium; Referee: Mahmoud Nagy (Egypt)

29 October 2026 8	Modern Sport	0–1	Al Ahly	Cairo
17:00 UTC+3	A. Youssef (yellow card) 78'; Fawzi (penalty missed)	Report	El Saaiy 17'; Eid (yellow card) 42'	Stadium: Cairo International Stadium; Referee: Amin Omar (Egypt)

23 November 2026 9	Al Ahly	v	Pyramids	Cairo
20:00 UTC+2		Report		Stadium: Cairo International Stadium; Referee: Iván Barton (El Salvador)

10 December 2026 10	Ghazl El Mahalla	v	Al Ahly	El Mahalla
20:00 UTC+2		Report		Stadium: Ghazl El Mahalla Stadium

15 December 2026 11	Al Ahly	v	Petrol Asyut	Cairo
17:00 UTC+2		Report		Stadium: Cairo International Stadium

24 December 2026 12	Ceramica Cleopatra	v	Al Ahly	Cairo
20:00 UTC+2		Report		Stadium: Osman Ahmed Osman Stadium

29 December 2026 13	Al Ahly	v	Al Ittihad	Cairo
20:00 UTC+2		Report		Stadium: Cairo International Stadium

5 January 2027 14	El Gouna	v	Al Ahly	El Gouna
17:00 UTC+2		Report		Stadium: Khaled Bichara Stadium

28 January 2027 15	Al Ahly	v	Petrojet-Suez	Cairo
20:00 UTC+2		Report		Stadium: Cairo International Stadium

1 February 2027 16	National Bank	v	Al Ahly	Cairo
20:00 UTC+2		Report		Stadium: Cairo International Stadium

6 February 2027 17	Al Ahly	v	Al Masry	Alexandria
20:00 UTC+2		Report		Stadium: Borg El Arab Stadium

12 February 2027 18	Al Ahly	v	Tala'ea El Gaish	Cairo
21:30 UTC+2		Report		Stadium: Cairo International Stadium

19 February 2027 19	Wadi Degla	v	Al Ahly	Cairo
21:30 UTC+2		Report		Stadium: Al Salam Stadium

=== Egypt Cup ===
7 November 2026 Round of 32	Al Ahly	3–0	El Sekka El Hadid	Cairo
20:00 UTC+2	Zizo 25', 36'; El Saaiy 78'	Report		Stadium: Cairo International Stadium; Referee: Walid Nagy (Egypt)

10 January 2027 Round of 16	Al Ahly	v	Suez Petrojet	Cairo
17:00 UTC+2

=== Egyptian League Cup ===
==== Group stage ====
Group C

Pos	Team	Pld	W	D	L	GF	GA	GD	Pts	Qualification
1	Al Ahly	2	2	0	0	6	0	+6	6	Advance to the quarter-finals
2	Al Mokawloon Al Arab	2	1	0	1	2	1	+1	3	Advance to the quarter-finals
3	Sharkia Enppi	1	0	1	0	0	0	0	1	
4	Asyut Petroleum	2	0	1	1	0	5	−5	1	
5	El Gouna	1	0	0	1	0	2	−2	0	

Updated to match(es) played on 15 November 2026. Source: EFL
Rules for classification: Group stage tiebreakers

7 October 2026 1	Asyut Petroleum	0–5	Al Ahly	Cairo
17:00 UTC+3	A. Medhat (yellow card) 49'; A. Younes (yellow card) 67'	Report	Afsha 2'; Ali (yellow card) 6'; Benjdida 33'; El Shahat 58', 60'; Moawad 79'	Stadium: Al Salam Stadium; Referee: Mohamed El Atabany (Egypt)

2 November 2026 2	Al Ahly	1–0	Al Mokawloon Al Arab	Cairo
20:00 UTC+2	Bencharki 90+3'; Y. Ibrahim (yellow card) 90+6'	Report	S. Hussein (yellow card) 90+6'	Stadium: Cairo International Stadium; Referee: Mohamed Maarouf (Egypt)

13 January 2027 3	Sharkia Enppi	v	Al Ahly
20:00 UTC+2

20 January 2027 4	Al Ahly	v	El Gouna
21:30 UTC+2

=== CAF Confederation Cup ===
==== Qualifying rounds ====
Al Ahly will receive a bye to the second round.

Second round

17 October 2026 First leg	Kitara (Uganda)	1–2	(Egypt) Al Ahly	Hoima, Uganda
16:00 UTC+3	Wahab 30'	Report	El Saaiy 67'; Zizo 82' (pen.)	Stadium: Hoima City Stadium; Referee: Eugene Mdluli (South Africa)

25 October 2026 Second leg	Al Ahly (Egypt)	4–0 (6–1 agg.)	(Uganda) Kitara	Cairo, Egypt
19:00 UTC+3	El Shahat 37', 51'; Afsha 44'; Taher 68'	Report		Stadium: Cairo International Stadium; Referee: Thabani Ruzario (Zimbabwe)

==== Group stage ====
Group A

The group stage draw was held on 28 October 2026.

Pos	Team	Pld	W	D	L	GF	GA	GD	Pts	Qualification	AHL	RCA	ASK	CPA
1	(Egypt) Al Ahly	0	0	0	0	0	0	0	0	Advance to knockout stage	—	20 Dec	24 Jan	29 Nov
2	(Morocco) Raja CA	0	0	0	0	0	0	0	0	Advance to knockout stage	10 Jan	—	29 Nov	24 Jan
3	(Togo) ASKO Kara	0	0	0	0	0	0	0	0		6 Dec	17 Jan	—	10 Jan
4	(Angola) Primeiro de Agosto	0	0	0	0	0	0	0	0		17 Jan	6 Dec	20 Dec	—

First match(es) will be played: 27 November 2026. Source: CAF
Rules for classification: Group stage tiebreakers

27–29 November 2026 1	Al Ahly (Egypt)	v	(Angola) 1º de Agosto	Cairo, Egypt
--:-- UTC+2				Stadium: Cairo International Stadium

4–6 December 2026 2	ASKO Kara (Togo)	v	(Egypt) Al Ahly	Lomé, Togo
--:-- UTC+0				Stadium: Kégué Stadium

18–20 December 2026 3	Al Ahly (Egypt)	v	(Morocco) Raja CA	Cairo, Egypt
--:-- UTC+2				Stadium: Cairo International Stadium

8–10 January 2027 4	Raja CA (Morocco)	v	(Egypt) Al Ahly	Casablanca, Morocco
--:-- UTC+1				Stadium: Stade Mohammed V

15–17 January 2027 5	1º de Agosto (Angola)	v	(Egypt) Al Ahly	Luanda, Angola
--:-- UTC+1				Stadium: França Ndalu Stadium

22–24 January 2027 6	Al Ahly (Egypt)	v	(Togo) ASKO Kara	Cairo, Egypt
--:--				Stadium: Cairo International Stadium

== Squad statistics ==
=== Overall ===
No.	Pos	Nat	Player	Total		EPL		CAF CC		Other^{1}	
No.	Pos	Nat	Player	Apps	Goals	Apps	Goals	Apps	Goals	Apps	Goals
1	GK	(Egypt)	Mohamed El Shenawy	3	0	1	0	2	0	0	0
2	DF	(Egypt)	Yassin Marei	5	0	3	0	1	0	1	0
3	DF	(Morocco)	Achraf Dari	5	1	2	1	2	0	1	0
4	DF	(Egypt)	Ahmed Eid	1	0	0	0	0	0	1	0
5	DF	(Egypt)	Hady Reyad	6	0	4	0	1	0	1	0
6	DF	(Egypt)	Yasser Ibrahim	2	1	2	1	0	0	0	0
7	FW	(Egypt)	Taher Mohamed	7	2	4	1	2	1	1	0
8	MF	(Egypt)	Ahmed Reda	6	0	5	0	0	0	1	0
9	FW	(Morocco)	Soufiane Benjdida	8	1	6	0	1	0	1	1
10	FW	(Algeria)	Monsef Bakrar	8	1	7	1	1	0	0	0
11	DF	(Egypt)	Karim El Debes	1	0	1	0	0	0	0	0
12	MF	(Egypt)	Akram Tawfik	3	0	1	0	1	0	1	0
13	MF	(Egypt)	Marwan Attia	8	1	7	1	1	0	0	0
14	FW	(Egypt)	Hussein El Shahat	8	5	5	1	2	2	1	2
15	MF	(Egypt)	Omar El Saaiy	6	2	4	1	1	1	1	0
17	FW	(Morocco)	Achraf Bencharki	8	2	7	2	1	0	0	0
18	FW	(Egypt)	Omar Moawad	1	1	0	0	0	0	1	1
19	MF	(Egypt)	Afsha	6	3	3	1	2	1	1	1
20	DF	(Morocco)	Youssef Belammari	0	0	0	0	0	0	0	0
21	MF	(Egypt)	Ali Mahmoud	6	0	5	0	0	0	1	0
22	MF	(Egypt)	Emam Ashour	5	0	5	0	0	0	0	0
24	DF	(Egypt)	Tawfik Mohamed	5	0	2	0	2	0	1	0
25	FW	(Egypt)	Zizo	8	4	7	3	1	1	0	0
26	DF	(Egypt)	Amr El Gazar	4	0	4	0	0	0	0	0
27	FW	(Egypt)	Aqtay Abdallah	3	0	3	0	0	0	0	0
28	FW	(Egypt)	Karim Fouad	3	0	1	0	2	0	0	0
29	FW	(Morocco)	Reda Slim	0	0	0	0	0	0	0	0
30	DF	(Egypt)	Mohamed Hany	7	1	7	1	0	0	0	0
31	GK	(Egypt)	Mostafa Shobeir	6	0	6	0	0	0	0	0
32	FW	(Egypt)	Mohamed Raafat	0	0	0	0	0	0	0	0
33	GK	(Egypt)	Hamza Alaa	1	0	0	0	0	0	1	0
35	MF	(Egypt)	Kabaka	0	0	0	0	0	0	0	0
36	MF	(Egypt)	Ahmed Koka	4	0	4	0	0	0	0	0
38	FW	(Egypt)	Mohamed Abdallah	1	0	0	0	0	0	1	0
39	FW	(Egypt)	Mahmoud Salah	0	0	0	0	0	0	0	0
49	DF	(Egypt)	Ibrahim El Asyuti	0	0	0	0	0	0	0	0

Last updated: 25 October 2026
Source: Soccerway

=== Goalscorers ===
Rank	No.	Pos.	Nat.	Photo	Player	League	Cup	League Cup	Confederation Cup	Total
1	25	FW	(Egypt)		Zizo	3	2	—	1	6
2	14	FW	(Egypt)		Hussein El Shahat	1	—	2	2	5
3	15	MF	(Egypt)		Omar El Saaiy	2	1	—	1	4
4	17	FW	(Morocco)		Achraf Bencharki	2	—	1	—	3
4	19	MF	(Egypt)		Afsha	1	—	1	1	3
5	7	FW	(Egypt)		Taher Mohamed	1	—	—	1	2
6	10	FW	(Algeria)		Monsef Bakrar	1	—	—	—	1
6	13	MF	(Egypt)		Marwan Attia	1	—	—	—	1
6	30	DF	(Egypt)		Mohamed Hany	1	—	—	—	1
6	3	DF	(Morocco)		Achraf Dari	1	—	—	—	1
6	6	DF	(Egypt)		Yasser Ibrahim	1	—	—	—	1
6	9	FW	(Morocco)		Soufiane Benjdida	—	—	1	—	1
6	18	FW	(Egypt)		Omar Moawad	—	—	1	—	1
Totals						15	3	6	6	30

Last updated: 7 November 2026
Source: Soccerway

=== Clean sheets ===
Rank	No.	Nat.	Photo	Player	League	Cup	League Cup	Confederation Cup	Total
1	31	(Egypt)		Mostafa Shobeir	4	—	—	—	4
2	1	(Egypt)		Mohamed El Shenawy	1	1	—	1	3
3	33	(Egypt)		Hamza Alaa	—	—	2	—	2
Totals					5	1	2	1	9

Last updated: 7 November 2026
Source: Soccerway

== Milestones ==
=== Debuts ===
The following players made their competitive debuts for the first team during the campaign.

Date	No.	Pos.	Nat.	Player	Age	Final score	Opponent	Competition	Source
23 August 2026	26	DF	(Egypt)	Amr El Gazar	27	3–2 (H)	Sharkia ENPPI	Egyptian League	
23 August 2026	10	FW	(Algeria)	Monsef Bakrar	25	3–2 (H)	Sharkia ENPPI	Egyptian League	
23 August 2026	9	FW	(Morocco)	Soufiane Benjdida	25	3–2 (H)	Sharkia ENPPI	Egyptian League	
23 August 2026	21	MF	(Egypt)	Ali Mahmoud	23	3–2 (H)	Sharkia ENPPI	Egyptian League	
28 August 2026	27	FW	(Egypt)	Aqtay Abdallah	23	0–2 (A)	ZED	Egyptian League	
7 October 2026	24	DF	(Egypt)	Tawfik Mohamed	26	0–5 (A)	Petrol Asyut	League Cup	
2 November 2026	39	FW	(Egypt)	Mahmoud Salah	19	1–0 (H)	Al Mokawloon Al Arab	League Cup	

(H) – Home; (A) – Away

=== First goals ===
The following players scored their first goals for Al Ahly's first team during the campaign.

Date	No.	Pos.	Nat.	Name	Age	Score	Final score	Opponent	Competition	Source
7 October 2026	9	FW	(Morocco)	Soufiane Benjdida	25	0–2 (A)	0–5 (A)	Petrol Asyut	League Cup	
11 October 2026	10	FW	(Algeria)	Monsef Bakrar	25	0–2 (A)	0–2 (A)	Zamalek	Egyptian League	
17 October 2026	15	MF	(Egypt)	Omar El Saaiy	23	1–1 (A)	1–2 (A)	Kitara	Confederation Cup	
21 October 2026	3	DF	(Morocco)	Achraf Dari	27	3–3 (H)	3–3 (H)	El Qanah	Egyptian League	

(H) – Home; (A) – Away

=== First starts as captain ===
The following players made their first starts as captain of Al Ahly's first team during the campaign.

Date	No.	Pos.	Nat.	Player	Age	Final score	Opponent	Competition	Source
29 October 2026	12	MF	(Egypt)	Akram Tawfik	28	0–1 (A)	Modern Sport	Egyptian League	

(H) – Home; (A) – Away
