= 2026–27 Zamalek SC season =

Zamalek
2026–27 season
- Chairman: Hussein Labib
- Manager: Motamed Gamal
- Stadium: Cairo International Stadium
- Egyptian Premier League: 1st
- Egypt Cup: TBD
- Egyptian League Cup: TBD
- Egyptian Super Cup: Semi-finals
- CAF Champions League: Ongoing
- Biggest win: Home: Zamalek 2–0 Abu Qir Fertilizers; Away: National Bank of Egypt 0–3 Zamalek
Home colours	Away colours
- All statistics correct as of 9 September 2026.

The 2026–27 season is Zamalek Sporting Club's 116th season in existence and their 67th consecutive season in the top-flight of Egyptian football, the Egyptian Premier League. In addition to the domestic league, Zamalek compete in the Egypt Cup, the Egyptian Super Cup, the Egyptian League Cup, and the CAF Champions League.

== Season summary ==
Zamalek began their domestic defense under head coach Motamed Gamal, who retained full authority over the technical staff following their successful title-winning campaign last season. In September 2026, the club unveiled its Nike away kit for the season under the promotional tagline "Back to Black", featuring a dark aesthetic with fluorescent volt accents, readied for their continental campaign opener.

== Players ==
As of 19 July 2026

Note: Flags indicate national team as defined under FIFA eligibility rules; some limited exceptions apply. Players may hold more than one non-FIFA nationality.

No.	Pos.	Nation	Player
1	GK	EGY	Mohamed Awad
2	DF	EGY	Ahmad Hossam
3	DF	MAR	Mahmoud Bentayg
4	DF	EGY	Omar Gaber (captain)
6	MF	EGY	Mahmoud Gehad
7	MF	EGY	Seif Gaafar
9	FW	EGY	Nasser Mansi
11	FW	EGY	Ahmed Abdel Rahim
12	MF	EGY	Ahmed Rabie
13	DF	EGY	Ahmed Abou El Fotouh
14	MF	EGY	Ahmed Hamdi
16	GK	EGY	Mohamed Sobhy
17	MF	EGY	Mohamed Shehata
18	MF	PLE	Adam Kaied

No.	Pos.	Nation	Player
19	MF	EGY	Abdallah El Said
24	DF	EGY	Mohamed Ismail
28	DF	EGY	Mahmoud Hamdy (vice-captain)
30	FW	TUN	Seifeddine Jaziri
31	FW	EGY	Ahmed Sherif
33	FW	BRA	Juan Alvina
37	GK	EGY	El Mahdy Soliman
38	DF	KEN	Baron Ochieng
39	MF	EGY	Mohamed El Sayed
46	GK	EGY	Mahmoud Ashraf
52	DF	EGY	Mohamed Ebrahim
81	FW	ANG	Chico Banza
90	FW	EGY	Amr Nasser
98	FW	PLE	Oday Dabbagh

== Transfers ==
=== In ===
Pos.	Player	Transferred from	Fee	Date	Source
CB	(Egypt) Mostafa El Zenary	(Egypt) Bank El Ahly	End of loan	30 June 2026	
FW	(Egypt) Hossam Ashraf	(Egypt) Smouha	End of loan	30 June 2026	
RB	(Egypt) Ahmed Mahmoud	(Egypt) Ittihad Alex	End of loan	30 June 2026	

=== Out ===
Pos.	Player	Transferred to	Fee	Date	Source
RW	(Brazil) Juan Bezerra	(United Arab Emirates) Shabab Al-Ahli	€4.35m		
CB	(Egypt) Hossam Abdelmaguid	(Bulgaria) Ludogorets	€1.50m		
CM	(Egypt) Ahmed Hamdi	(Egypt) Ittihad Alex	Free transfer		
RB	(Egypt) Ahmed Mahmoud	(Egypt) Sharkia Enppi	Free transfer		
CB	(Egypt) Ahmed Magdy	(Egypt) Petrol Asyut	Free transfer		
FW	(Tunisia) Seifeddine Jaziri	(United Arab Emirates) Hatta Club			
RB	(Kenya) Baron Ochieng	Without Club			
RW	(Egypt) Hazem Osama	Without Club			

== Competitions ==
=== Overview ===
Competition	Starting round	Current position/round	Final position	Record							
Competition	Starting round	Current position/round	Final position	G	W	D	L	GF	GA	GD	Win %
Egyptian Premier League	Matchday 1	1st		4	3	1	0	7	1	+6	75.00
Egypt Cup	TBD	TBD		0	0	0	0	0	0	0	—
Egyptian League Cup	TBD	TBD		0	0	0	0	0	0	0	—
Egyptian Super Cup	Semi-finals	Semi-finals		0	0	0	0	0	0	0	—
CAF Champions League	First qualifying round	Ongoing		1	1	0	0	2	1	+1	100.00
Total				5	4	1	0	9	2	+7	80.00

Last updated: 9 September 2026 Source: Competitions

=== Egyptian Premier League ===
==== Regular season ====
Pos	Team	Pld	W	D	L	GF	GA	GD	Pts	Qualification or relegation
1	Pyramids	8	8	0	0	19	4	+15	24	Qualification for the championship play-offs
2	Al Ahly	8	6	2	0	15	6	+9	20	Qualification for the championship play-offs
3	Zamalek	8	6	1	1	11	4	+7	19	Qualification for the championship play-offs
4	Ceramica Cleopatra	8	6	0	2	15	8	+7	18	Qualification for the championship play-offs
5	Al Ittihad	8	4	2	2	9	6	+3	14	Qualification for the championship play-offs

Updated to match(es) played on 16 November 2026. Source: Soccerway (regular season)
Rules for classification: 1) Points; 2) Goal difference; 3) Goals scored.

===== Matches =====
21 August 2026 1	Zamalek	0–0	Al Ittihad Alexandria

26 August 2026 2	National Bank of Egypt	0–3	Zamalek

31 August 2026 3	Zamalek	2–1	Petrojet-Suez

8 September 2026 4	Zamalek	2–0	Abo Qir Semad

16 September 2026 5	Ghazl Al Mahalla	0–1	Zamalek
20:00 UTC+3

11 October 2026 6	Zamalek	0–2	Al Ahly	Cairo
20:00 UTC+3	Gaber (yellow card) 70'	Report	Hany 39'; Bakrar 80'	Stadium: Cairo International Stadium; Attendance: 50,000; Referee: Rade Obrenović (Solvenia)

20 October 2026 7	Petrol Asyut	0–1	Zamalek
16:00

28 October 2026 8	Zamalek	2–1	El Mokawloon
18:00

23 November 2026 9	El Gouna	–	Zamalek
16:00

9 December 2026 10	Zamalek	–	El Masry
19:00

14 December 2026 11	Smouha	–	Zamalek
16:00

23 December 2026 12	Zamalek	–	Talaae El Gaish
19:00

28 December 2026 13	Pyramids	–	Zamalek
19:00

4 January 2027 14	Zamalek	–	Wadi Degla
19:00

27 January 2027 15	Zed FC	–	Zamalek
19:00

31 January 2027 16	Zamalek	–	Modern Sport
16:00

5 February 2027 17	Ceramica Cleopatra	–	Zamalek
19:00

11 February 2027 18	Zamalek	–	Sharkia Enppi
20:30

18 February 2027 19	El Qanah	–	Zamalek
20:30

=== CAF Champions League ===
==== Qualifying rounds ====
===== First qualifying round =====
4 September 2026 CAF Champions League	Ports (Djibouti)	1–2	Zamalek

12 September 2026 CAF Champions League	Zamalek	4–0	Ports (Djibouti)
20:00 UTC+3
