= 2026–27 Al Ittihad Alexandria Club season =

Al Ittihad Alexandria Club
2026–27 season
- Chairman: Mohamed Salama
- Manager: Hamza El Gamal
- Stadium: Alexandria Stadium
- Egyptian Premier League: Regular season: 5th
- Egypt Cup: Quarter-finals
- Egyptian League Cup: Group stage

The 2026–27 season is the 113th season in Al Ittihad Alexandria's existence. They are also competing in the Egypt Cup and the League Cup.

== Transfers ==
=== In ===
Pos.	Player	Transferred from	Fee	Date	Source
FW	(Egypt) Hossam Hassan	(Egypt) Modern Sport		8 July 2026	
MF	(Egypt) Mohamed Fakhry	(Egypt) Pharco		8 July 2026	
DF	(Egypt) Moamen Awad	(Egypt) Haras El Hodoud		8 July 2026	
DF	(Egypt) Khaled Massad	(Egypt) El Tersana		8 July 2026	
DF	(Egypt) Abdel Rahman Hesham	(Egypt) Maliyat Kafr El Zayat		8 July 2026	
DF	(Egypt) Ahmed El Shazly	(Egypt) Maliyat Kafr El Zayat		8 July 2026	
MF	(Egypt) Ahmed Hamdy	(Egypt) Zamalek	Free	12 July 2026	
DF	(Egypt) Mohamed Mostafa Medo	(Egypt) Smouha		12 July 2026	
GK	(Egypt) Ahmed El Araby	(Egypt) Ghazl El Mahalla		12 July 2026	
MF	(Egypt) Ahmed El Sayed	(Egypt) Tanta		12 July 2026	
GK	(Egypt) Ali El Gabry	(Egypt) Ceramica Cleopatra		29 July 2026	
MF	(Egypt) Nour Alaa	(Egypt) Ceramica Cleopatra	Loan	29 July 2026	
MF	(Egypt) Mohamed Tony	(Egypt) Ceramica Cleopatra		29 July 2026	
MF	(Egypt) El Habib Ahmed Hassan	(Egypt) Smouha		29 July 2026	
DF	(Egypt) Islam Abdel Lah	(Egypt) ZED	Loan	29 July 2026	
FW	(Egypt) Yousry Waheed	National Bank of Egypt	Loan	29 July 2026	
DF	(Egypt) Moatez Mohamed	(Egypt) Al Ahly	Free		
MF	Kenneth Semakula				
FW	(Nigeria) Joseph Armola				
	(Egypt) Anas Wael	(Egypt) Zamalek	Free	15 August 2026	
MF	(Egypt) Mahmoud Emad	National Bank of Egypt	Loan	15 August 2026	
DF	(Egypt) Mostafa Moawad	(Jordan) Al-Wehdat		15 August 2026	
DF	(Egypt) Mazen Osama	(Egypt) Dirout		15 August 2026	

== Competitions ==
=== Overall record ===
Competition	First match	Last match	Starting round	Record							
Competition	First match	Last match	Starting round	Pld	W	D	L	GF	GA	GD	Win %
Egyptian Premier League	21 August 2026		Matchday 1	8	4	2	2	9	6	+3	50.00
Egypt Cup	4 November 2026			2	2	0	0	3	1	+2	100.00
Egyptian League Cup	8 October 2026		Group stage	1	0	0	1	0	1	−1	0.00
Total				11	6	2	3	12	8	+4	54.55

Last updated: 22 November 2026
Source: Competitions

=== Egyptian Premier League ===
Regular season

Pos	Team	Pld	W	D	L	GF	GA	GD	Pts	Qualification or relegation
3	Zamalek	8	6	1	1	11	4	+7	19	Qualification for the championship play-offs
4	Ceramica Cleopatra	8	6	0	2	15	8	+7	18	Qualification for the championship play-offs
5	Al Ittihad	8	4	2	2	9	6	+3	14	Qualification for the championship play-offs
6	Modern Sport	8	4	1	3	12	10	+2	13	Qualification for the championship play-offs
7	Al Mokawloon Al Arab	8	3	2	3	11	8	+3	11	Qualification for the relegation play-offs

Updated to match(es) played on 16 November 2026. Source: Soccerway (regular season)
Rules for classification: 1) Points; 2) Goal difference; 3) Goals scored.

Results summary

Overall								Home						Away					
Pld	W	D	L	GF	GA	GD	Pts	W	D	L	GF	GA	GD	W	D	L	GF	GA	GD
8	4	2	2	9	6	+3	14	3	1	1	6	4	+2	1	1	1	3	2	+1

Results by round

Round	1	2	3	4	5	6	7	8
Ground	A	H	H	H	A	H	A	H
Result	D	L	W	W	W	W	L	D
Position								

Updated to match(es) played on 30 October 2026. Source:
A = Away; H = Home; W = Win; D = Draw; L = Loss

Matches

21 August 2026 1	Zamalek	0–0	Al Ittihad Alexandria	Cairo
20:00 UTC+3				Stadium: Cairo International Stadium; Referee: Amin Omar

28 August 2026 2	Al Ittihad Alexandria	1–3	Ceramica Cleopatra	Alexandria
				Stadium: Alexandria Stadium

2 September 2026 3	Al Ittihad Alexandria	2–0	Abou Qir	Alexandria
	Hossam Hassan 68'; Saviour 90+6'			Stadium: Alexandria Stadium

7 September 2026 4	Al Ittihad Alexandria	1–0	Petrol Asyut	Alexandria
17:00 UTC+3	Nour Alaa 74'			Stadium: Alexandria Stadium

15 September 2026 5	Al Masry	0–2	Al Ittihad Alexandria

13 October 2026 6	Al Ittihad Alexandria	2–1	El Gouna	Alexandria
19:00 UTC+3				Stadium: Alexandria Stadium; Referee: Tarek Magdy

21 October 2026 7	Ghazl El Mahalla	2–1	Al Ittihad Alexandria	El Mahalla El Kubra
16:00 UTC+3				Stadium: Ghazl El Mahalla Stadium

30 October 2026 8	Al Ittihad Alexandria	0–0	Tala'ea El Gaish	Alexandria
20:00 UTC+2				Stadium: Alexandria Stadium

24 November 2026 9	Wadi Degla	v	Al Ittihad Alexandria
20:00 UTC+2

=== Egypt Cup ===
4 November 2026 Round of 32	Ghazl El Mahalla	1–2	Al Ittihad Alexandria	El Mahalla El Kubra
17:00 UTC+2	El Arfaoui 85'		Ebuka 75' (pen.) 80'	Stadium: Ghazl El Mahalla Stadium; Referee: Tarek Magdy

18 November 2026 Round of 16	El Gouna	0–1 (a.e.t.)	Al Ittihad Alexandria	El Gouna
17:00 UTC+2			Awad 105+1'	Stadium: Khaled Bichara Stadium; Referee: Mohamed El Etbany

=== Egyptian League Cup ===
==== Group stage ====
Group A

Al Ittihad Alexandria had a bye in Matchday 2.

Pos	Team	Pld	W	D	L	GF	GA	GD	Pts	Qualification
1	Wadi Degla	2	2	0	0	2	0	+2	6	Advance to the quarter-finals
2	ZED	2	1	1	0	3	0	+3	4	Advance to the quarter-finals
3	Tala'ea El Gaish	1	0	1	0	0	0	0	1	
4	Al Ittihad	1	0	0	1	0	1	−1	0	
5	Zamalek	2	0	0	2	0	4	−4	0	

Updated to match(es) played on 15 November 2026. Source: EFL
Rules for classification: Group stage tiebreakers

8 October 2026 1	Al Ittihad Alexandria	0–1	Wadi Degla	Alexandria
16:00 UTC+3				Stadium: Alexandria Stadium; Referee: Abdel Aziz El Sayed
