= 2026–27 El Sharkia ENPPI SC season =

El Sharkia Enppi SC
2026–27 season
- Chairman: Ayman El-Sherei
- Manager: Mohamed Barakat
- Stadium: Petro Sport Stadium
- Egyptian Premier League: Regular season: 16th
- Egypt Cup: Round of 16
- Egyptian League Cup: Group stage

The 2026–27 season is the 42nd season in El Sharkia Enppi's existence and the club's 25th consecutive season in the Egyptian top flight. They are also competing in the Egypt Cup and the League Cup.

== Transfers ==
=== In ===
| Pos. | Player | Transferred from | Fee | Date | Source |
|---|---|---|---|---|---|
| | (Egypt) Mostafa Fawzy | Telecom Egypt | | | |
| | (Egypt) Ammar Hamdy | (Egypt) ZED | | | |
| | (Egypt) Ahmed Mahmoud | (Egypt) Zamalek | | | |
| MF | (Egypt) Mohamed Essam | (Egypt) Ceramica Cleopatra | Undisclosed | | |
| | (Egypt) Ahmed Shaddad | (Egypt) Al Masry | | | |
| | (Egypt) Youssef Sayed Abdel Hafiz | (Egypt) Al Ahly | | | |

=== Out ===
| Pos. | Player | Transferred to | Fee | Date | Source |
|---|---|---|---|---|---|
| MF | (Egypt) Ali Mahmoud | (Egypt) Al Ahly | Undisclosed | | |
| | (Egypt) Aqtay Abdullah | (Egypt) Al Ahly | | | |
| | (Egypt) Khaled Seddik | (Egypt) El Gouna | Loan | | |
| | (Egypt) Ahmed Zaki | (Egypt) El Gouna | Loan | | |
| | (Egypt) Salah Zayed | (Egypt) El Gouna | Loan | | |
| | (Egypt) Ahmed Sherif | (Egypt) El Gouna | Loan | | |
| | (Egypt) Seif Safaga | (Algeria) Temouchent | Loan | | |
| | (Egypt) Mohab Sami | (Egypt) Canal | Loan | | |

== Competitions ==
=== Overall record ===
| Competition | First match | Last match | Starting round | Record | | | | | | | |
| Competition | First match | Last match | Starting round | Pld | W | D | L | GF | GA | GD | Win % |
|---|---|---|---|---|---|---|---|---|---|---|---|
| Egyptian Premier League | 23 August 2026 | | Matchday 1 | 8 | 2 | 1 | 5 | 11 | 16 | −5 | 25.00 |
| Egypt Cup | 6 November 2026 | | | 1 | 1 | 0 | 0 | 3 | 2 | +1 | 100.00 |
| Egyptian League Cup | 3 November 2026 | | Group stage | 1 | 0 | 1 | 0 | 0 | 0 | +0 | 0.00 |
| Total | | | | 10 | 3 | 2 | 5 | 14 | 18 | −4 | 30.00 |

Last updated: 22 November 2026
Source: Competitions

=== Egyptian Premier League ===
Regular season

| Pos | Team | Pld | W | D | L | GF | GA | GD | Pts | Qualification or relegation |
|---|---|---|---|---|---|---|---|---|---|---|
| 14 | Tala'ea El Gaish | 8 | 2 | 2 | 4 | 6 | 12 | −6 | 8 | Qualification for the relegation play-offs |
| 15 | Wadi Degla | 8 | 1 | 4 | 3 | 8 | 10 | −2 | 7 | Qualification for the relegation play-offs |
| 16 | El Sharkia Enppi | 8 | 2 | 1 | 5 | 11 | 16 | −5 | 7 | Qualification for the relegation play-offs |
| 17 | Ghazl El Mahalla | 8 | 2 | 1 | 5 | 4 | 11 | −7 | 7 | Qualification for the relegation play-offs |
| 18 | Asyut Petroleum | 8 | 1 | 3 | 4 | 4 | 8 | −4 | 6 | Qualification for the relegation play-offs |

Updated to match(es) played on 16 November 2026. Source: Soccerway (regular season)
Rules for classification: 1) Points; 2) Goal difference; 3) Goals scored.

Results summary

| Overall | | | | | | | | Home | | | | | | Away | | | | | |
| Pld | W | D | L | GF | GA | GD | Pts | W | D | L | GF | GA | GD | W | D | L | GF | GA | GD |
|---|---|---|---|---|---|---|---|---|---|---|---|---|---|---|---|---|---|---|---|
| 8 | 2 | 1 | 5 | 11 | 16 | −5 | 7 | 1 | 0 | 3 | 4 | 9 | −5 | 1 | 1 | 2 | 7 | 7 | 0 |

Results by round

| Round | 1 | 2 | 3 | 4 | 5 | 6 | 7 | 8 |
|---|---|---|---|---|---|---|---|---|
| Ground | A | H | A | H | H | A | H | A |
| Result | L | L | D | W | L | L | L | W |
| Position | | | | | | | | |

Updated to match(es) played on 30 October 2026. Source:
A = Away; H = Home; W = Win; D = Draw; L = Loss

Matches

| 23 August 2026 1 | Al Ahly | 3–2 | El Sharkia Enppi | Cairo |
| 20:00 UTC+3 | | | | Stadium: Cairo International Stadium |

| 28 August 2026 2 | El Sharkia Enppi | 1–3 | Wadi Degla |

| 1 September 2026 3 | Ghazl El Mahalla | 0–0 | El Sharkia Enppi |

| 9 September 2026 4 | El Sharkia Enppi | 2–1 | ZED |

| 17 September 2026 5 | El Sharkia Enppi | 1–2 | Pyramids |

| 12 October 2026 6 | Modern Sport | 3–2 | El Sharkia Enppi |

| 19 October 2026 7 | El Sharkia Enppi | 0–3 | Al Mokawloon Al Arab |
| 20:00 UTC+3 |

| 30 October 2026 8 | Canal | 1–3 | El Sharkia Enppi |
| 20:00 UTC+2 |

| 25 November 2026 9 | El Sharkia Enppi | v | Ceramica Cleopatra |

=== Egypt Cup ===
| 6 November 2026 Round of 32 | El Sharkia Enppi | 3–2 | Proxy | Cairo |
| 17:00 UTC+2 | Hamdy 11' (pen.); Ghanem 38', 42' | | Felix 4' (pen.); Kamavinga 40' | Stadium: Petro Sport Stadium |

| Round of 16 | Zamalek | v | El Sharkia Enppi |

=== Egyptian League Cup ===
==== Group stage ====
Group C

El Sharkia Enppi had a bye in Matchday 1.

| Pos | Team | Pld | W | D | L | GF | GA | GD | Pts | Qualification |
|---|---|---|---|---|---|---|---|---|---|---|
| 1 | Al Ahly | 2 | 2 | 0 | 0 | 6 | 0 | +6 | 6 | Advance to the quarter-finals |
| 2 | Al Mokawloon Al Arab | 2 | 1 | 0 | 1 | 2 | 1 | +1 | 3 | Advance to the quarter-finals |
| 3 | Sharkia Enppi | 1 | 0 | 1 | 0 | 0 | 0 | 0 | 1 | |
| 4 | Petrol Asyut | 2 | 0 | 1 | 1 | 0 | 5 | −5 | 1 | |
| 5 | El Gouna | 1 | 0 | 0 | 1 | 0 | 2 | −2 | 0 | |

Updated to match(es) played on 15 November 2026. Source: EFL
Rules for classification: Group stage tiebreakers

| 3 November 2026 2 | El Sharkia Enppi | 0–0 | Petrol Asyut | Cairo |
| 20:00 UTC+2 | | | | Stadium: Petro Sport Stadium; Referee: Sayed Shaaban |

| 3 | El Gouna | v | El Sharkia Enppi |
