= 2026–27 Al Masry SC season =

Al Masry SC
2026–27 season
- Chairman: Kamel Abu Ali
- Manager: Nabil Kouki (from 31 October); Ahmed Samy (2 September – 31 October); Emad El Nahhas (until 2 September)
- Stadium: Suez Stadium
- Egyptian Premier League: Regular season: 12th
- Egypt Cup: Quarter-finals
- Egyptian League Cup: Group stage

The 2026–27 season is the 107th season in Al Masry's history and the 56th consecutive season in the Egyptian top flight. They are also competing in the Egypt Cup and, as defending champions, the League Cup.

== Transfers ==
=== In ===
Pos.	Player	Transferred from	Fee	Date	Source
FW	(Morocco) Abdullah El Zayani	(Morocco) Defence Hassani El Jadidi		27 July 2026	
DF	(Egypt) Mostafa El Aash	(Egypt) Al Ahly	Undisclosed		
MF	(Egypt) Yassin El Mallah	(Egypt) Pharco			
DF	(Egypt) Mohamed Shokry	(Egypt) Al Ahly	Undisclosed	30 July 2026	
GK	(Egypt) Mohamed Seha	(Egypt) Al Ahly		2 August 2026	
	(Algeria) Kheireddine Toual	(Algeria) ES Sétif			
FW	(Eritrea) Ali Suleiman	(Egypt) Kahrabaa Ismailia		15 August 2026	

== Competitions ==
=== Overall record ===
Competition	First match	Last match	Starting round	Record							
Competition	First match	Last match	Starting round	Pld	W	D	L	GF	GA	GD	Win %
Egyptian Premier League	22 August 2026		Matchday 1	8	2	3	3	8	10	−2	25.00
Egypt Cup	7 November 2026			2	2	0	0	5	1	+4	100.00
Egyptian League Cup	8 October 2026		Group stage	2	1	1	0	1	0	+1	50.00
Total				12	5	4	3	14	11	+3	41.67

Last updated: 22 November 2026
Source: Competitions

=== Egyptian Premier League ===
Regular season

Pos	Team	Pld	W	D	L	GF	GA	GD	Pts	Qualification or relegation
10	ZED	8	3	2	3	9	10	−1	11	Qualification for the relegation play-offs
11	Montakhab El Suez Petrojet	8	2	3	3	11	13	−2	9	Qualification for the relegation play-offs
12	Al Masry	8	2	3	3	8	10	−2	9	Qualification for the relegation play-offs
13	El Qanah	8	1	5	2	10	12	−2	8	Qualification for the relegation play-offs
14	Tala'ea El Gaish	8	2	2	4	6	12	−6	8	Qualification for the relegation play-offs

Updated to match(es) played on 16 November 2026. Source: Soccerway (regular season)
Rules for classification: 1) Points; 2) Goal difference; 3) Goals scored.

Results summary

Overall								Home						Away					
Pld	W	D	L	GF	GA	GD	Pts	W	D	L	GF	GA	GD	W	D	L	GF	GA	GD
8	2	3	3	8	10	−2	9	1	1	2	2	4	−2	1	2	1	6	6	0

Results by round

Round	1	2	3	4	5	6	7	8
Ground	H	A	H	A	H	A	H	A
Result	W	W	L	L	L	D	D	D
Position								

Updated to match(es) played on 28 October 2026. Source:
A = Away; H = Home; W = Win; D = Draw; L = Loss

Matches

22 August 2026 1	Al Masry	1–0	Smouha	Suez
20:00 UTC+3				Stadium: Suez Stadium

27 August 2026 2	Al Mokawloon Al Arab	2–3	Al Masry
20:00 UTC+3

31 August 2026 3	Al Masry	0–1	Pyramids

7 September 2026 4	Petrojet	2–1	Al Masry

15 September 2026 5	Al Masry	0–2	Al Ittihad

11 October 2026 6	Canal	1–1	Al Masry

19 October 2026 7	Al Masry	1–1	Abou Qir

28 October 2026 8	National Bank of Egypt	1–1	Al Masry
17:00 UTC+3

24 November 2026 9	Al Masry	v	Petrol Asyut

=== Egypt Cup ===
7 November 2026 Round of 32	Al Masry	2–1	Misr Lel Makkasa	Suez
	Sharaf 20'; El Zayani 75'		Mahdy 51'	Stadium: Suez Stadium

19 November 2026 Round of 16	Al Masry	3–0	Petrol Asyut	Suez
17:00 UTC+2	Tmine 21' (pen.); El Zayani 40'; Toual 90+5'			Stadium: Suez Stadium

=== Egyptian League Cup ===
==== Group stage ====
Group D

Pos	Team	Pld	W	D	L	GF	GA	GD	Pts	Qualification
1	Al Masry	2	1	1	0	1	0	+1	4	Advance to the quarter-finals
2	Ceramica Cleopatra	2	1	0	1	2	1	+1	3	Advance to the quarter-finals
3	Ghazl Al Mahalla	1	0	1	0	1	1	0	1	
4	Suez Petrojet	1	0	1	0	0	0	0	1	
5	Abou Qir	2	0	1	1	1	3	−2	1	

Updated to match(es) played on 15 November 2026. Source: EFL
Rules for classification: Group stage tiebreakers

8 October 2026 1	Al Masry	1–0	Ceramica Cleopatra

4 November 2026 2	Al Masry	0–0	Petrojet	Suez
				Stadium: Suez Stadium; Referee: Mostafa Othman
