= 2024–25 Ghazl El Mahalla SC season =

Ghazl El Mahalla
2024–25 season
- Manager: Ahmed Eid Abdel Malek (until 3 December); Shawky Gharieb (from 8 December)
- Stadium: Ghazl El Mahalla Stadium
- Egyptian Premier League: 15th
- Egypt Cup: Round of 16
- Egyptian League Cup: Group stage
- Top goalscorer: League: Mohamed Ali Ben Hammouda (4); All: Mohamed Ali Ben Hammouda (4)
- Biggest defeat: Pyramids 3–0 Ghazl El Mahalla
- All statistics correct as of 21 January 2025.

The 2024–25 season is the 89th season in Ghazl El Mahalla SC's history and the first season in the Premier League. In addition to the domestic league, Ghazl El Mahalla is set to compete in the domestic cup, and the Egyptian League Cup.

== Transfers ==
=== In ===
Date	Pos.	Player	From	Fee	Ref.
21 August 2024	MF	(Egypt) Hossam Greisha	(Egypt) Al Masry	€76,000	
29 August 2024	FW	(Egypt) Mohamed Hamdy Zaky	(Egypt) Aswan	€37,000	
13 September 2024	DF	(Egypt) Ahmed Hakam	(Egypt) Smouha	Loan	
17 September 2024	MF	(Egypt) Mohamed Ashraf Ben Sharqi	(Egypt) La Viena FC	Undisclosed	
18 September 2024	MF	(Egypt) Ibrahim Hassan	(Egypt) National Bank	Free	
21 September 2024	FW	(Tunisia) Mohamed Ali Ben Hammouda	(Tunisia) ES Tunis	€60,000	
17 October 2024	DF	(Ivory Coast) Abdoul Aziz Coulibaly	(Ghana) Right to Dream	Undisclosed	
20 October 2024	DF	(Egypt) Abdelrahman Semida	(Egypt) Pyramids	Free	
23 October 2024	FW	(Egypt) Mahmoud Setouhi	(Egypt) Al Ittihad	Free	
24 October 2024	MF	(Egypt) Youssef Hassan	(Egypt) Baladiyat El Mahalla	Undisclosed	
20 January 2025	DF	(Palestine) Mousa Farawi	(Egypt) National Bank	Undisclosed	

== Friendlies ==
30 September 2024 Friendly	Smouha (Egypt)	1–0	(Egypt) Ghazl El Mahalla

2 October 2024 Friendly	Al Ittihad (Egypt)	3–1	(Egypt) Ghazl El Mahalla	Alexandria
16:30 UTC+3	Farid 20'; Boateng 70'		Zaky 79'	Stadium: Alexandria Stadium

7 October 2024 Friendly	Tala'ea El Gaish (Egypt)	1–0	(Egypt) Ghazl El Mahalla	Ismailia
		Report

10 October 2024 Friendly	Ghazl El Mahalla (Egypt)	1–1	(Egypt) National Bank	Cairo
	Castelo	Report	Annor

23 October 2024 Friendly	Ghazl El Mahalla (Egypt)	3–2	(Egypt) Tanta	El Mahalla El Kubra
	Ashraf; Ben Hammouda; El Akhmimi	Report		Stadium: Ghazl El Mahalla Stadium

17 January 2025 Friendly	Ghazl El Mahalla (Egypt)	0–0	Egypt U20	El Mahalla El Kubra
		Report		Stadium: Ghazl El Mahalla Stadium

== Competitions ==
=== Overall record ===
Competition	First match	Last match	Starting round	Record							
Competition	First match	Last match	Starting round	Pld	W	D	L	GF	GA	GD	Win %
Egyptian Premier League	2 November 2024	30 May 2025	Matchday 1	9	2	2	5	7	14	−7	22.22
Egypt Cup	5 January 2025		Round of 32	1	1	0	0	1	0	+1	100.00
Egyptian League Cup	12 December 2024		Group stage	1	1	0	0	3	1	+2	100.00
Total				11	4	2	5	11	15	−4	36.36

Last updated: 21 January 2025
Source: Competitions

=== Egyptian Premier League ===
==== Regular season ====
Pos	Team	Pld	W	D	L	GF	GA	GD	Pts	Qualification or relegation
14	Al Ittihad	18	4	6	8	11	18	−7	18	
15	Ismaily	18	4	5	9	12	21	−9	17	
16	Ghazl El Mahalla	18	5	2	11	16	27	−11	17	
17	ENPPI	17	2	6	9	10	21	−11	12	Relegation to Second Division A
18	Modern Sport	18	2	6	10	11	24	−13	12	Relegation to Second Division A

Updated to match(es) played on 13 March 2025. Source: Soccerway (regular season), Soccerway (championship round), Soccerway (relegation round)
Rules for classification: 1) Points; 2) Head-to-head points; 3) Head-to-head goal difference; 4) Goal difference; 5) Goals scored; 6) Play-off tie.
(Note: Head-to-head records are used for final standings only)

==== Results summary ====
Overall								Home						Away					
Pld	W	D	L	GF	GA	GD	Pts	W	D	L	GF	GA	GD	W	D	L	GF	GA	GD
9	2	2	5	7	14	−7	8	0	1	4	2	9	−7	2	1	1	5	5	0

Last updated: 21 January 2025.

==== Results by round ====
Round	1	2	3	4	5	6	7	8	9
Ground	A	H	A	H	H	A	H	A	H
Result	D	L	W	L	D	W	L	L	L
Position	8	12	7	13	15				

Updated to match(es) played on 21 January 2025. Source:
A = Away; H = Home; W = Win; D = Draw; L = Loss

==== Matches ====
The league schedule was released on 19 October 2024.

2 November 2024 1	Ismaily	0–0	Ghazl El Mahalla	Ismailia
17:00 UTC+2				Stadium: Ismailia Stadium; Referee: Mohamed Marouf

7 November 2024 2	Ghazl El Mahalla	2–3	Tala'ea El Gaish	El Mahalla El Kubra
17:00 UTC+2	Ben Hammouda 79', 90+5'		Fathy 14'; Okwara 70' (pen.); El Sheikh 88'	Stadium: Ghazl El Mahalla Stadium; Referee: Amin Omar

23 November 2024 3	El Gouna	0–1	Ghazl El Mahalla	El Gouna
17:00 UTC+2			Yehia 25'	Stadium: Khaled Bichara Stadium; Referee: Mustafa Al-Shahdi

2 December 2024 4	Ghazl El Mahalla	0–4	Zamalek	El Mahalla El Kubra
20:00 UTC+2	Zakaria (red card) 3'		Mansi 18', 21'; Zizo 72' (pen.); Abdelmaguid 79'	Stadium: Ghazl El Mahalla Stadium; Referee: Mahmoud Bassiouni

21 December 2024 5	Ghazl El Mahalla	0–0	Al Ittihad	El Mahalla El Kubra
17:00 UTC+2				Stadium: Ghazl El Mahalla Stadium; Referee: Mostafa El Shahdi

26 December 2024 6	Smouha	2–4	Ghazl El Mahalla	Alexandria
17:00 UTC+2	Hassan 20' (pen.); Saber 75'		Amoory 32'; Ben Hammouda 53' (pen.), 88' (pen.); Zaky 56' (pen.); El Akhmimi (yellow card) 75' (yellow-red card) 90+4'	Stadium: Alexandria Stadium; Referee: Mohamed Maarouf

1 January 2025 7	Ghazl El Mahalla	0–1	National Bank	El Mahalla El Kubra
20:00 UTC+2			Annor 6'	Stadium: Ghazl El Mahalla Stadium; Referee: Mostafa Osman

15 January 2025 8	Pyramids	3–0	Ghazl El Mahalla	Cairo
16:00 UTC+2	Gabr 34'; Adel 51'; Mayele 84'			Stadium: 30 June Stadium; Referee: Tarek Magdy

21 January 2025 9	Ghazl El Mahalla	0–1	Haras El Hodoud	El Mahalla El Kubra
16:00 UTC+2			El Gazar 82' (o.g.)	Stadium: Ghazl El Mahalla Stadium; Referee: Atef Hussein

=== Egypt Cup ===
5 January 2025 Round of 32	Ghazl El Mahalla	1–0	Sporting Alexandria	El Mahalla El Kubra
14:30	Essam 45+3'			Stadium: Ghazl El Mahalla Stadium; Referee: Ahmed Hamdy

8 March 2025 Round of 16	Ghazl El Mahalla	v	Pharco	El Mahalla El Kubra
21:30 UTC+2				Stadium: Ghazl El Mahalla Stadium

=== Egyptian League Cup ===
==== Group stage ====
Pos	Team	Pld	W	D	L	GF	GA	GD	Pts	Qualification
1	National Bank	1	1	0	0	5	0	+5	3	Advance to knockout stage
2	Ghazl El Mahalla	1	1	0	0	3	1	+2	3	Advance to knockout stage
3	Al Masry	1	0	1	0	1	1	0	1	
4	ZED	2	0	1	1	2	4	−2	1	
5	Ceramica Cleopatra	1	0	0	1	0	5	−5	0	

Updated to match(es) played on 19 March 2025. Source: EPL
Rules for classification: Group stage tiebreakers

12 December 2024 1	Ghazl El Mahalla	3–1	ZED	El Mahalla El Kubra
20:00 UTC+2	Zaky 11'; Abdul Fatawu 25'; Yehia 38'		Hussein 71' (pen.)	Stadium: Ghazl El Mahalla Stadium; Referee: Sobhy El Amrawy

18 March 2025 2	National Bank	v	Ghazl El Mahalla

23 March 2025 3	Ceramica Cleopatra	v	Ghazl El Mahalla

23 April 2025 4	Ghazl El Mahalla	v	Al Masry	Suez
				Stadium: Suez Stadium
