= 2024–25 Petrojet SC season =

Petrojet
2024–25 season
- Manager: Sayed Eid
- Stadium: Cairo Military Academy Stadium
- Egyptian Premier League: 8th
- Egypt Cup: Round of 32
- Egyptian League Cup: Group stage
- Top goalscorer: League: Bader Mousa (2); All: Bader Mousa (2)
- All statistics correct as of 2 January 2025.

The 2024–25 season is the 25th season in Petrojet SC's history and the first season in the Premier League. In addition to the domestic league, Petrojet is set to compete in the domestic cup, and the Egyptian League Cup.

== Transfers ==
=== In ===
Date	Pos.	Player	From	Fee	Ref.
3 September 2024	MF	(Egypt) Zyad Farag	(Egypt) Al Masry	Loan	
25 September 2024	MF	(Palestine) Bader Mousa	(Egypt) El Entag El Harby	Free	
2 October 2024	GK	(Egypt) Mohamed Fawzy	(Egypt) Ismaily	Free	
19 October 2024	MF	(Nigeria) Adeoye Ifeoluwa	(Egypt) Ceramica Cleopatra	Free	
21 October 2024	DF	(Egypt) Islam Abdallah	(Egypt) Al Ahly U21	Free	

== Friendlies ==
10 October 2024 Friendly	Zamalek (Egypt)	1–2	(Egypt) Petrojet	Cairo
	Shalaby 57'	Report		Stadium: Petrosport Stadium

16 November 2024 Friendly	Petrojet (Egypt)	2–1	(Egypt) Haras El Hodoud
		Report

== Competitions ==
=== Overall record ===
Competition	First match	Last match	Starting round	Final position	Record							
Competition	First match	Last match	Starting round	Final position	Pld	W	D	L	GF	GA	GD	Win %
Egyptian Premier League	1 November 2024	30 May 2025	Matchday 1		8	2	4	2	6	6	+0	25.00
Egypt Cup	2 January 2025		Round of 32	Round of 32	1	0	1	0	0	0	+0	0.00
Egyptian League Cup	11 December 2024		Group stage		1	1	0	0	1	0	+1	100.00
Total					10	3	5	2	7	6	+1	30.00

Last updated: 10 January 2025
Source: Competitions

=== Egyptian Premier League ===
==== League table ====
Pos	Team	Pld	W	D	L	GF	GA	GD	Pts
5	National Bank of Egypt	18	8	5	5	1	2	−1	29
6	Pharco	18	7	5	6	2	1	+1	26
7	Petrojet	18	6	7	5	2	1	+1	25
8	Ceramica Cleopatra	17	6	6	5	0	0	0	24
9	Haras El Hodoud	18	6	4	8	1	2	−1	22

Updated to match(es) played on 13 March 2025. Source: Soccerway (championship round)
Rules for classification: 1) Points; 2) Goal difference; 3) Goals scored; 4) Play-off tie.
(Note: Clubs qualified for this phase with the full regular season points they got, but without goals for or against)

==== Results summary ====
Overall								Home						Away					
Pld	W	D	L	GF	GA	GD	Pts	W	D	L	GF	GA	GD	W	D	L	GF	GA	GD
8	2	4	2	6	6	0	10	1	2	1	3	3	0	1	2	1	3	3	0

Last updated: 10 January 2025.

==== Results by round ====
Round	1	2	3	4	5	6	7	8	9
Ground	A	H	A	H	A	H	A	H	H
Result	D	D	L	L	W	W	D	D	
Position	6	9	13	16	12	8			

Updated to match(es) played on 10 January 2025. Source:
A = Away; H = Home; W = Win; D = Draw; L = Loss

==== Matches ====
The league schedule was released on 19 October 2024.

1 November 2024 1	Pyramids	1–1	Petrojet	Cairo
17:00 UTC+2	Mayele 7'		Chukwudi 3'	Stadium: 30 June Stadium; Referee: Mahmoud Al-Banna

8 November 2024 2	Petrojet	1–1	Modern Sport	Cairo
17:00 UTC+2	Mousa 57'		Zaazaa 48'	Stadium: Cairo Military Academy Stadium; Referee: Mahmoud Wafa

24 November 2024 3	Ismaily	1–0	Petrojet	Ismailia
17:00 UTC+2	Omar 90'			Stadium: Ismailia Stadium; Referee: Amin Omar

2 December 2024 4	Petrojet	1–2	Pharco	Cairo
17:00 UTC+2	Metwally 73' (pen.); Abo Ziada (yellow card) 84' (yellow-red card) 90+5'		Gehad 23'; Farag 41'	Stadium: Petrosport Stadium; Referee: Walid Abdelrazek

19 December 2024 5	Tala'ea El Gaish	0–1	Petrojet	Cairo
17:00 UTC+2			Mousa 32'	Stadium: Gehaz El Reyada Stadium; Referee: Nader Qamar Al-Dawla

26 December 2024 6	Petrojet	1–0	El Gouna	Cairo
20:00 UTC+2	Reda 90+5'			Stadium: Petrosport Stadium; Referee: Amin Omar

30 December 2024 7	ZED	1–1	Petrojet	Cairo
20:00 UTC+2	Hussein 90+6'		Hesham 89'	Stadium: Cairo International Stadium; Referee: Mohamed Adel

10 January 2025 8	Petrojet	0–0	ENPPI	Cairo
16:00 UTC+2	El Metwaly (penalty missed) 19'			Stadium: Petrosport Stadium; Referee: Hesham El Kadi

23 January 2025 9	Petrojet	v	Al Masry
16:00 UTC+2

=== Egypt Cup ===
2 January 2025 Round of 32	Petrojet	0–0 (a.e.t.) (3–4 p)	Al Mokawloon Al Arab	Cairo
14:30 UTC+2				Stadium: Petrosport Stadium; Referee: Mostafa El Shahdi
	Penalties
	Bamba (penalty missed); Mohamed (penalty missed); Hamdan (penalty scored); Farag (penalty scored); Bahbah (penalty scored)		(penalty scored) Al Badry; (penalty missed) El Kadi; (penalty scored) Ochaya; (penalty scored) Manga; (penalty scored) Ojera

=== Egyptian League Cup ===
==== Group stage ====
Pos	Team	Pld	W	D	L	GF	GA	GD	Pts	Qualification
1	El Gouna	2	1	1	0	2	1	+1	4	Advance to knockout stage
2	Petrojet	1	1	0	0	1	0	+1	3	Advance to knockout stage
3	Zamalek	1	0	1	0	1	1	0	1	
4	Modern Sport	1	0	0	1	0	1	−1	0	
5	Smouha	1	0	0	1	0	1	−1	0	

Updated to match(es) played on 19 March 2025. Source: EPL
Rules for classification: Group stage tiebreakers

11 December 2024 1	Modern Sport	0–1	Petrojet	Cairo
20:00 UTC+2			Bamba 61'	Stadium: Petrosport Stadium; Referee: Ahmed Hamdy

18 March 2025 2	Smouha	v	Petrojet	Alexandria
				Stadium: Alexandria Stadium

24 March 2025 3	Petrojet	v	Zamalek	Cairo
				Stadium: Cairo Military Academy Stadium

1 April 2025 4	Petrojet	v	El Gouna	Cairo
				Stadium: Petrosport Stadium
