= 2024–25 El Gouna FC season =

El Gouna
2024–25 season
- Manager: Alaa Abdelaal
- Stadium: Khaled Bichara Stadium
- Egyptian Premier League: 17th
- Egypt Cup: Round of 16
- Egyptian League Cup: Group stage
- All statistics correct as of 15 January 2025.

The 2024–25 season is the 22nd season in the history of El Gouna FC and the second consecutive season in the Premier League. In addition to the domestic league, El Gouna is set to compete in the domestic cup, and the Egyptian League Cup.

== Transfers ==
=== In ===
Date	Pos.	Player	From	Fee	Ref.
22 September 2024	DF	(Egypt) Essam Sobhy	(Egypt) Ismaily	Free	
11 October 2024	FW	(Egypt) Seif Shika	(Egypt) ZED	Undisclosed	
12 October 2024	MF	(Nigeria) Favour Akem	(Egypt) Ceramica Cleopatra	Loan	
19 October 2024	DF	(Egypt) Ahmed Reda	(Egypt) Wadi Degla	Loan	
25 October 2024	GK	(Egypt) Hassan Mahmoud Shahin	(Egypt) National Bank	Free	
25 October 2024	FW	(Nigeria) Tolulope Ojo	(Egypt) Pyramids	Free	
25 October 2024	MF	(Egypt) Ali El Zahdi	(Egypt) Tala'ea El Gaish	Free	
2 January 2025	FW	(Egypt) Marwan Mohsen	Unattached	Free	

== Friendlies ==
15 November 2024 Friendly	Pyramids (Egypt)	2–1	(Egypt) El Gouna	Cairo
16:00 UTC+2	Obama; Hamdy	Report		Stadium: 30 June Stadium

== Competitions ==
=== Overall record ===
Competition	First match	Last match	Starting round	Record							
Competition	First match	Last match	Starting round	Pld	W	D	L	GF	GA	GD	Win %
Egyptian Premier League	31 October 2024	30 May 2025	Matchday 1	9	1	3	5	2	7	−5	11.11
Egypt Cup	3 January 2025		Round of 32	1	1	0	0	2	0	+2	100.00
Egyptian League Cup	11 December 2024		Group stage	1	1	0	0	1	0	+1	100.00
Total				11	3	3	5	5	7	−2	27.27

Last updated: 21 January 2025
Source: Competitions

=== Egyptian Premier League ===
==== League table ====
Pos	Team	Pld	W	D	L	GF	GA	GD	Pts
10	ZED	18	5	9	4	18	13	+5	24
11	Tala'ea El Gaish	18	5	6	7	13	19	−6	21
12	El Gouna	18	5	5	8	12	15	−3	20
13	Smouha	18	6	2	10	13	24	−11	20
14	Al Ittihad	18	4	6	8	11	18	−7	18

Updated to match(es) played on 13 March 2025. Source: Soccerway (regular season), Soccerway (championship round), Soccerway (relegation round)
Rules for classification: 1) Points; 2) Head-to-head points; 3) Head-to-head goal difference; 4) Goal difference; 5) Goals scored; 6) Play-off tie.
(Note: Head-to-head records are used for final standings only)

==== Results summary ====
Overall								Home						Away					
Pld	W	D	L	GF	GA	GD	Pts	W	D	L	GF	GA	GD	W	D	L	GF	GA	GD
9	1	3	5	2	7	−5	6	1	1	3	2	4	−2	0	2	2	0	3	−3

Last updated: 21 January 2025.

==== Results by round ====
Round	1	2	3	4	5	6	7	8	9
Ground	H	A	H	A	H	A	H	A	H
Result	D	D	L	D	W	L	L	L	L
Position	8	11	14	14	10				

Updated to match(es) played on 21 January 2025. Source:
A = Away; H = Home; W = Win; D = Draw; L = Loss

==== Matches ====
The league schedule was released on 19 October 2024.

31 October 2024 1	El Gouna	0–0	ZED	El Gouna
17:00 UTC+3	El Sayed (penalty missed) 13'			Stadium: Khaled Bichara Stadium; Referee: Ahmed Hamdi

9 November 2024 2	Al Masry	0–0	El Gouna	Suez
17:00 UTC+2				Stadium: Suez Stadium; Referee: Ibrahim Mohamed

23 November 2024 3	El Gouna	0–1	Ghazl El Mahalla	El Gouna
17:00 UTC+2			Yehia 25'	Stadium: Khaled Bichara Stadium; Referee: Mustafa Al-Shahdi

1 December 2024 4	Smouha	0–0	El Gouna	Alexandria
20:00 UTC+2				Stadium: Alexandria Stadium; Referee: Hisham Al-Qadi

20 December 2024 5	El Gouna	1–0	ENPPI	El Gouna
17:00 UTC+2	El Zahdi 85'			Stadium: Khaled Bichara Stadium; Referee: Ahmed Gamal

26 December 2024 6	Petrojet	1–0	El Gouna	Cairo
20:00 UTC+2	Reda 90+5'			Stadium: Petrosport Stadium; Referee: Amin Omar

30 December 2024 7	El Gouna	0–1	Pyramids	El Gouna
17:00 UTC+2			El Gabbas 90+4'	Stadium: Khaled Bichara Stadium; Referee: Mohamed El Sabahi

15 January 2025 8	Al Ahly	2–0	El Gouna	Cairo
19:00 UTC+2	Ashour 63', 90+1'			Stadium: Cairo International Stadium; Referee: Mohamed El Hanafi

21 January 2025 9	El Gouna	1–2	National Bank	El Gouna
16:00 UTC+2	Magdy 12' (pen.)		Serial (yellow card) 11' (yellow-red card) 72'; Faisal 35' (pen.); Annor 59', (red card) 69'	Stadium: Khaled Bichara Stadium; Referee: Nader Qamar El Dawla

=== Egypt Cup ===
3 January 2025 Round of 32	El Gouna	2–0	El Qanah	El Gouna
14:30 UTC+2	Ahmed Reda (red card) 34'; Akem 44'; Shika 61'		Hersha (red card) 67'	Stadium: Khaled Bichara Stadium; Referee: Atef Hussein

3 February 2025 Round of 16	El Gouna	v	Team FC	El Gouna
14:30 UTC+2				Stadium: Khaled Bichara Stadium

=== Egyptian League Cup ===
==== Group stage ====
Pos	Team	Pld	W	D	L	GF	GA	GD	Pts	Qualification
1	El Gouna	2	1	1	0	2	1	+1	4	Advance to knockout stage
2	Petrojet	1	1	0	0	1	0	+1	3	Advance to knockout stage
3	Zamalek	1	0	1	0	1	1	0	1	
4	Modern Sport	1	0	0	1	0	1	−1	0	
5	Smouha	1	0	0	1	0	1	−1	0	

Updated to match(es) played on 19 March 2025. Source: EPL
Rules for classification: Group stage tiebreakers

11 December 2024 1	El Gouna	1–0	Smouha	El Gouna
17:00 UTC+2	Shika 65'			Stadium: Khaled Bichara Stadium; Referee: Mohamed El Desouki

19 March 2025 2	Zamalek	v	El Gouna	Cairo
				Stadium: Cairo International Stadium

1 April 2025 3	Petrojet	v	El Gouna	Cairo

23 April 2025 4	El Gouna	v	Modern Sport	El Gouna
				Stadium: Khaled Bichara Stadium
