= 2024–25 ENPPI SC season =

ENPPI
2024–25 season
- Chairman: Ayman El-Sherei
- Manager: Sayed Yassin (until 2 December); Mohamed Ismail (from 2 December)
- Stadium: Petrosport Stadium
- Egyptian Premier League: 15th
- Egypt Cup: Quarter-finals
- Egyptian League Cup: Group stage
- Top goalscorer: League: Ali Fawzi (3); All: Ali Fawzi (3)
- All statistics correct as of 16 January 2025.

The 2024–25 season is the 39th season in ENPPI SC's history and the 23rd consecutive season in the Premier League. In addition to the domestic league, ENPPI is set to compete in the domestic cup, and the Egyptian League Cup.

== Transfers ==
=== In ===
Date	Pos.	Player	From	Fee	Ref.
14 September 2024	DF	(Egypt) Mohamed Samir	(Egypt) Tala'ea El Gaish	Free	
9 October 2024	FW	(Egypt) Youssef Hassan	(Egypt) Zamalek	Free	
25 October 2024	MF	(Madagascar) Tendry Mataniah	(Madagascar) Disciples FC	Undisclosed	

=== Out ===
Date	Pos.	Player	To	Fee	Ref.
20 August 2024	MF	(Egypt) Abdelrahman Emad	(Egypt) ZED	Free	
2 September 2024	GK	(Egypt) Abdelaziz El Balouti	National Bank of Egypt	222,000€	

== Friendlies ==
10 October 2024 Friendly	Al Ittihad (Egypt)	1–2	(Egypt) ENPPI	Alexandria
	Apeh 80'		Labib 30'; Kabou 31'	Stadium: Alexandria Stadium

== Competitions ==
=== Overall record ===
Competition	First match	Last match	Starting round	Record							
Competition	First match	Last match	Starting round	Pld	W	D	L	GF	GA	GD	Win %
Egyptian Premier League	31 October 2024	30 May 2025	Matchday 1	9	1	4	4	5	8	−3	11.11
Egypt Cup	3 January 2025		Round of 32	2	2	0	0	2	0	+2	100.00
Egyptian League Cup	18 March 2025		Group stage	0	0	0	0	0	0	+0	—
Total				11	3	4	4	7	8	−1	27.27

Last updated: 21 January 2025
Source: Competitions

=== Egyptian Premier League ===
==== Regular season ====
===== League table =====
Pos	Team	Pld	W	D	L	GF	GA	GD	Pts	Qualification or relegation
14	Ghazl El Mahalla	17	5	2	10	16	24	−8	17	Qualification for the relegation play-offs
15	El Gouna	17	4	5	8	10	15	−5	17	Qualification for the relegation play-offs
16	Ismaily	17	3	5	9	11	21	−10	14	Qualification for the relegation play-offs
17	ENPPI	17	2	6	9	10	21	−11	12	Qualification for the relegation play-offs
18	Modern Sport	17	1	6	10	9	24	−15	9	Qualification for the relegation play-offs

Source: Soccerway (regular season)
Rules for classification: 1) Points; 2) Goal difference; 3) Goals scored.

===== Results summary =====
Overall								Home						Away					
Pld	W	D	L	GF	GA	GD	Pts	W	D	L	GF	GA	GD	W	D	L	GF	GA	GD
9	1	4	4	5	8	−3	7	1	2	2	2	3	−1	0	2	2	3	5	−2

Last updated: 21 January 2025.

===== Results by round =====
Round	1	2	3	4	5	6	7	8	9
Ground	A	H	A	H	A	A	H	A	H
Result	D	L	L	W	L	D	D	D	L
Position	8	14	16	11	16				

Updated to match(es) played on 21 January 2025. Source:
A = Away; H = Home; W = Win; D = Draw; L = Loss

===== Matches =====
The league schedule was released on 19 October 2024.

31 October 2024 1	Modern Sport	0–0	ENPPI	Cairo
20:00 UTC+3	Ngwem (penalty missed) 90+8'			Stadium: Al Salam Stadium; Referee: Mustafa Al-Shahdi

8 November 2024 2	ENPPI	1–2	Pyramids	Cairo
20:00 UTC+2	Fawzi 45+2' (pen.)		Atef 3', 35'	Stadium: Petrosport Stadium; Referee: Abdel Aziz El-Sayed

22 November 2024 3	Pharco	4–3	ENPPI	Alexandria
17:00 UTC+2	Nasser 35' (pen.), 44'; Gehad 85'; Sherif 89'		Kalousha 15'; Fawzi 81' (pen.), 90+11' (pen.)	Stadium: Haras El Hodoud Stadium; Referee: Mohamed El Atabani

1 December 2024 4	ENPPI	1–0	Ismaily	Cairo
20:00 UTC+2	Shakshak 67'		Hamdi (penalty missed) 62'; Al-Nabris (penalty missed) 72'	Stadium: Petrosport Stadium; Referee: Ibrahim Mohamed

20 December 2024 5	El Gouna	1–0	ENPPI	El Gouna
17:00 UTC+2	El Zahdi 85'			Stadium: Khaled Bichara Stadium; Referee: Ahmed Gamal

24 December 2024 6	ZED	0–0	ENPPI	Cairo
17:00 UTC+2				Stadium: Cairo International Stadium; Referee: Mahmoud Nassef

30 December 2024 7	ENPPI	0–0	Al Ahly	Cairo
17:00 UTC+2	Kalousha (penalty missed) 89'			Stadium: Osman Ahmed Osman Stadium; Referee: Mahmoud Bassiouni

10 January 2025 8	Petrojet	0–0	ENPPI	Cairo
16:00 UTC+2	El Metwaly (penalty missed) 19'			Stadium: Petrosport Stadium; Referee: Hesham El Kadi

21 January 2025 9	ENPPI	0–1	Tala'ea El Gaish	Cairo
19:00 UTC+2				Stadium: Petrosport Stadium; Referee: Ahmed Nasser Abbas

==== Relegation round ====
===== League table =====
Pos	Team	Pld	W	D	L	GF	GA	GD	Pts	Relegation
5	Smouha	2	0	0	2	0	3	−3	20	
6	Al Ittihad	2	0	1	1	0	2	−2	19	
7	Ismaily	2	1	1	0	1	0	+1	18	
8	ENPPI	1	1	0	0	2	1	+1	15	Relegation to Second Division A
9	Modern Sport	2	1	0	1	3	2	+1	12	Relegation to Second Division A

Updated to match(es) played on 11 April 2025. Source: Soccerway (relegation round)
Rules for classification: 1) Points; 2) Goal difference; 3) Goals scored; 4) Play-off tie.
(Note: Clubs qualified for this phase with the full regular season points they got, but without goals for or against)

=== Egypt Cup ===
3 January 2025 Round of 32	ENPPI	1–0	Haras El Hodoud	Cairo
17:30 UTC+2	Hawash 48'			Stadium: Petrosport Stadium; Referee: Mohamed Abbas Qabil

16 January 2025 Round of 16	ENPPI	1–0	Ismaily	Cairo
14:30 UTC+2	Ammar 6' (o.g.)			Stadium: Petrosport Stadium

15 March 2025 Quarter-finals	Pyramids	2–1	ENPPI	Cairo
21:30 UTC+2	Fathi 15'; Obama 90+8'		El Agouz 53'	Stadium: 30 June Stadium

=== Egyptian League Cup ===
==== Group stage ====
Pos	Team	Pld	W	D	L	GF	GA	GD	Pts	Qualification
1	Tala'ea El Gaish	3	2	1	0	5	2	+3	7	Advance to knockout stage
2	ENPPI	3	2	0	1	2	1	+1	6	Advance to knockout stage
3	Pharco	3	1	1	1	3	3	0	4	
4	Al Ahly	3	0	0	3	2	6	−4	0	

Source: EPL
Rules for classification: Group stage tiebreakers

18 March 2025 1	Al Ahly	v	ENPPI	Cairo
				Stadium: Cairo International Stadium

22 March 2025 2	ENPPI	v	Pharco	Cairo
				Stadium: Petrosport Stadium

22 April 2025 3	Tala'ea El Gaish	v	ENPPI	Cairo
				Stadium: Gehaz El Reyada Stadium
