= 2026–27 Egyptian Premier League =

Egyptian Premier League
- Season: 2026–27
- Dates: 21 August 2026 –
- Matches: 50
- Goals: 103 (2.06 per match)
- Top goalscorer: 4 Players (3 goals)
- Biggest home win: Al Ahly 3–2 El Sharkia Enppi
- Biggest away win: Ghazl El Mahalla 0–3 Pyramids; Montakhab El Suez Petrojet 0–3 Zamalek
- Highest scoring: Al Ahly 3–2 El Sharkia Enppi
- All statistics correct as of 17 September 2026.

The 2026–27 Egyptian Premier League season is the 68th edition of the Egyptian Premier League, the top professional league for association football clubs in the Egyptian football league system, since its establishment in 1948.

== Format ==
The league consists of 20 teams in a single group and is played in two phases. In the first phase, teams face each other once in a single-leg tie, after which the league splits into two groups. Phase two features a championship group for the teams finishing first to sixth and a relegation group for teams placed seventh to twentieth. The first-place team in the championship group is crowned league champion and qualifies for the CAF Champions League alongside the runner-up, while the third-place team qualifies for the CAF Confederation Cup. Four of the teams in the relegation group get relegated to the Egyptian Second Division A at the end of the season.

== Teams ==
Locations of the 2026–27 Egyptian Premier League teams

A total of three teams were promoted to the league from the 2025–26 Egyptian Second Division A. The first team was champions El Qanah, who were back in the Egyptian Premier League for the first time since the 2014 Season. They were joined by Asyut Petroleum, who returned to the league after a seventeen-year absence by clinching the second promotion spot. Abou Qir were the last team to earn promotion, who got promoted to the league for the first time in their history, after coming third.

=== Stadiums and locations ===
Team	Location	Stadium (Note: Main stadiums for the 2024–25 season are listed only. Clubs are allowed to play selected matches at alternative venues; whether due to unavailability, security concerns, or other reasons. For example, Al Ittihad, a team from Alexandria, may play some home games at Borg El Arab Stadium, instead of their regular home stadium, Alexandria Stadium.)	Capacity
Abou Qir	Abu Qir	Alexandria Stadium	19,676
Al Ahly	Gezira	Cairo International Stadium	75,000
Al Mokawloon Al Arab	Abageyah	Osman Ahmed Osman Stadium	35,000
Asyut Petroleum	Asyut	Asiut University Stadium	16,000
Ceramica Cleopatra	6th of October	Osman Ahmed Osman Stadium	35,000
El Sharkia Enppi	Sharkia	Petrosport Stadium	16,000
El Qanah	Ismailia	Suez Canal Stadium	22,000
Ghazl El Mahalla	El Mahalla El Kubra	Ghazl El Mahalla Stadium	14,564
El Gouna	El Gouna	Khaled Bichara Stadium	12,000
Al Ittihad	Alexandria	Alexandria Stadium	19,676
Al Masry	Port Said (Al Dawahy)	Suez Stadium	27,000
Modern Sport	Mokattam	Cairo International Stadium	75,000
National Bank of Egypt	Agouza	Cairo International Stadium	75,000
Montakhab El Suez Petrojet	Suez (Faisal)	Cairo Military Academy Stadium	28,500
Pyramids	New Cairo	30 June Stadium	30,000
Smouha	Alexandria	Borg El Arab Stadium	86,000
Tala'ea El Gaish	Al Waili	Gehaz El Reyada Stadium	20,000
Wadi Degla SC	Zahraa El Maadi	Petrosport Stadium	16,000
Zamalek	Mit Okba	Cairo International Stadium	75,000
ZED	Sheikh Zayed City	Cairo International Stadium	75,000

=== Managerial changes ===
Team	Outgoing manager	Manner of departure	Date of vacancy	Position in table	Incoming manager	Date of appointment

== Regular season ==
Pos	Team	Pld	W	D	L	GF	GA	GD	Pts	Qualification or relegation
1	Pyramids	8	8	0	0	19	4	+15	24	Qualification for the championship play-offs
2	Al Ahly	8	6	2	0	15	6	+9	20	Qualification for the championship play-offs
3	Zamalek	8	6	1	1	11	4	+7	19	Qualification for the championship play-offs
4	Ceramica Cleopatra	8	6	0	2	15	8	+7	18	Qualification for the championship play-offs
5	Al Ittihad	8	4	2	2	9	6	+3	14	Qualification for the championship play-offs
6	Modern Sport	8	4	1	3	12	10	+2	13	Qualification for the championship play-offs
7	Al Mokawloon Al Arab	8	3	2	3	11	8	+3	11	Qualification for the relegation play-offs
8	National Bank of Egypt	8	3	2	3	9	9	0	11	Qualification for the relegation play-offs
9	Smouha	8	3	2	3	5	5	0	11	Qualification for the relegation play-offs
10	ZED	8	3	2	3	9	10	−1	11	Qualification for the relegation play-offs
11	Montakhab El Suez Petrojet	8	2	3	3	11	13	−2	9	Qualification for the relegation play-offs
12	Al Masry	8	2	3	3	8	10	−2	9	Qualification for the relegation play-offs
13	El Qanah	8	1	5	2	10	12	−2	8	Qualification for the relegation play-offs
14	Tala'ea El Gaish	8	2	2	4	6	12	−6	8	Qualification for the relegation play-offs
15	Wadi Degla	8	1	4	3	8	10	−2	7	Qualification for the relegation play-offs
16	El Sharkia Enppi	8	2	1	5	11	16	−5	7	Qualification for the relegation play-offs
17	Ghazl El Mahalla	8	2	1	5	4	11	−7	7	Qualification for the relegation play-offs
18	Asyut Petroleum	8	1	3	4	4	8	−4	6	Qualification for the relegation play-offs
19	Abou Qir	8	1	1	6	3	12	−9	4	Qualification for the relegation play-offs
20	El Gouna	8	0	3	5	5	11	−6	3	Qualification for the relegation play-offs

Updated to match(es) played on 16 November 2026. Source: Soccerway (regular season)
Rules for classification: 1) Points; 2) Goal difference; 3) Goals scored.

== Regular season results ==
Home \ Away	ABO	AHL	ASY	CER	SEI	GMH	GOU	ITH	MAS	MOD	MOK	NBE	MSP	PYR	QAN	SMO	TGS	WDG	ZAM	ZED
Abou Qir								0–2				1–0								
Al Ahly	2–0				3–2											1–0			a	
Asyut Petroleum										0–2		0–1	1–1							
Ceramica Cleopatra										2–0		2–0			1–2					
El Sharkia Enppi														1–2				1–3		2–1
Ghazl El Mahalla					0–0									0–3					0–1	
El Gouna										1–1	0–1		1–2							
Al Ittihad			1–0	1–3						0–2										
Al Masry								0–2						0–1		1–0				
Modern Sport						2–0												2–1		
Al Mokawloon Al Arab		1–1							2–3											
National Bank of Egypt						3–1													0–3	
Montakhab El Suez Petrojet									2–1								2–3			
Pyramids	2–0						1–0													
El Qanah							1–1										1–1			
Smouha			0–0	0–2																
Tala'ea El Gaish											1–0					0–1				0–1
Wadi Degla											0–2				0–0					0–0
Zamalek	2–0	a						0–0					2–1							
ZED		0–2													2–1					

Updated to match(es) played on 17 September 2026. Source: Soccerway
Legend: Blue = home team win; Yellow = draw; Red = away team win.
For upcoming matches, an "a" indicates there is an article about the rivalry between the two participants.

== Number of teams by governorate ==
Number of teams	Governorate	Team(s)
6	Cairo	Al Ahly, Al Mokawloon Al Arab, Modern Sport, Pyramids, Tala'ea El Gaish and Wadi Degla
4	Giza	Ceramica Cleopatra, National Bank of Egypt, Zamalek and ZED
3	Alexandria	Abou Qir, Al Ittihad, and Smouha
1	Ismailia	El Qanah
1	Gharbia	Ghazl El Mahalla
1	Port Said	Al Masry
1	Red Sea	El Gouna
1	Suez	Montakhab El Suez Petrojet
1	Asyut	Asyut Petroleum
1	Sharqia	El Sharkia Enppi

== Statistics ==
=== Top scorers ===
Rank	Player	Club	Goals
1	(Egypt) Various	Four Players	2

=== Discipline ===
==== Player ====
- Most yellow cards: 2
  - Various
- Most red cards: 1
  - Various

==== Club ====
- Most yellow cards: 10
  - Wadi Degla
- Fewest yellow cards: 3
  - Montakhab El Suez Petrojet and ZED
- Most red cards: 2
  - Tala'ea El Gaish
- Fewest red cards: 0
  - Various

== See also ==
- 2026–27 Egyptian Second Division A
- 2026–27 Egyptian Second Division B
- 2026–27 Egypt Cup
