= Abduallah Mohamed =

Egyptian footballer (born 2003)

Abduallah Mohamed (Arabic: عبد الله محمد; born 24 September 2003) is an Egyptian professional footballer who plays as a midfielder for Egyptian Premier League club Zamalek on loan to Modern Future FC.
