= Mahmoud Salah (footballer, born 2007) =

Egyptian footballer (born 2007)

Personal information
- Date of birth: 22 September 2007 (age 19)
- Place of birth: El Mahalla, Egypt
- Position: Left winger

Team information
- Current team: Al Ahly
- Number: 39

Youth career
- 2015–2025: Ghazl El Mahalla

Senior career*
Years	Team	Apps	(Gls)
2025–2026	Ghazl El Mahalla	23	(4)
2026–	Al Ahly	0	(0)

International career
2024–2025	Egypt U17	3	(0)
2026–	Egypt U20	4	(1)
- * Club domestic league appearances and goals as of 16:23, 24 August 2026 (UTC)

Mahmoud Salah (Arabic: محمود صلاح; born 22 September 2007) is an Egyptian professional footballer who plays as a winger for Egyptian Premier League club Al Ahly.

== International career ==
Salah represented Egypt at the 2026 UNAF U20 Tournament held in Egypt, scoring one goals in the tournament to help his nation win the title and getting the best player of the tournament.

== Career statistics ==
=== Club ===
As of 9 September 2026

Club	Season	League			Cup		Continental		Other		Total	
Club	Season	Division	Apps	Goals	Apps	Goals	Apps	Goals	Apps	Goals	Apps	Goals
Ghazl El Mahalla	2024–25	EPL	0	0	0	0	—		1	0	1	0
Ghazl El Mahalla	2025–26	EPL	23	4	1	0	—		4	0	28	4
Ghazl El Mahalla	Total		23	4	1	0	0	0	5	0	29	4
Al Ahly	2026–27	EPL	0	0	0	0	0 (Note: Appearances in CAF Confederation Cup)	0	0	0	0	0
Al Ahly	Total		0	0	0	0	0	0	0	0	0	0
Career Total			23	4	1	0	0	0	5	0	29	4
