= Ali Mahmoud (footballer) =

Egyptian footballer (born 2002)

Personal information
- Full name: Ali Mahmoud
- Date of birth: 4 December 2002 (age 23)
- Place of birth: Egypt
- Height: 1.78 m (5 ft 10 in)
- Position: Midfielder

Team information
- Current team: Al Ahly
- Number: 21

Youth career
- 2009–2015: Al Ahly
- 2015–2022: Enppi

Senior career*
Years	Team	Apps	(Gls)
2022–2023	→ El Masry Salloum (loan)	?	(?)
2023–2024	→ Pioneers (loan)	?	(?)
2024–2026	Enppi	34	(1)
2026–	Al Ahly	2	(0)

International career^{‡}
2026–	Egypt	1	(0)
- * Club domestic league appearances and goals as of 23:14, 29 August 2026 (UTC) ‡ National team caps and goals as of 22:20, 25 September 2026 (UTC)

Ali Mahmoud (Arabic: علي محمود; born 4 December 2002) is an Egyptian professional footballer who plays as a midfielder for the Egyptian Premier League club Al Ahly and the Egypt national team.

== Club Career ==
On 7 July 2026, Al Ahly announced they had signed Ali from Enppi on a five-year contract. He was given the number 21 shirt, previously worn by club legend Ali Maâloul.

== Career statistics ==
=== Club ===
As of 29 August 2026

Club	Season	League			Cup		Continental		Other		Total	
Club	Season	Division	Apps	Goals	Apps	Goals	Apps	Goals	Apps	Goals	Apps	Goals
Enppi	2024–25	EPL	15	0	1	0	—		1	0	17	0
Enppi	2025–26	EPL	19	1	4	0	—		10	3	33	4
Enppi	Total		34	1	5	0	0	0	11	3	50	4
Al Ahly	2026–27	EPL	2	0	0	0	0 (Note: Appearances in CAF Confederation Cup)	0	0	0	0	0
Al Ahly	Total		2	0	0	0	0	0	0	0	2	0
Career Total			36	1	5	0	0	0	11	3	52	4
