= 2026–27 Egypt Cup =

Tournament details
- Country: Egypt
- Dates: 24 August 2026 –
- Teams: 72

The 2026–27 Egypt Cup is the 95th edition of the premier knockout football competition in Egypt, organized by the Egyptian Football Association (EFA).

== Format ==
The competition began with a first preliminary round featuring 72 teams. The Egyptian Premier League clubs will enter the tournament at the Round of 32. Extra time will only be applied starting from the Round of 32, and VAR (Video Assistant Referee) technology is not utilized in single-elimination knockout rounds.

== Preliminary rounds ==
=== Fourth preliminary round ===
	Misr Lel Makkasa	2–0	Levels
14:30 UTC+2

	Misr Insurance	0–0 (4–2 p)	Pharco
14:30 UTC+2

	Proxy	0–0 (4–2 p)	Diamond
14:30 UTC+2

	Al Aluminium	1–1 (8–9 p)	Ittihad Al Shorta
14:30 UTC+2

	Al Nasr	0–1	El Sekka El Hadid
14:30 UTC+2

	Delphi	3–2	Mega Sport
14:30 UTC+2

	Nogoom	0–3	We
14:30 UTC+2

	El Dakhleya	1–0	Tersana
14:30 UTC+2

	El Rabat & El Anwar	1–1 (4–5 p)	Port Fouad
14:30 UTC+2

	Samannoud	1–1 (5–4 p)	Baladiyat El Mehalla
14:30 UTC+2

	El Minya	0–0 (4–3 p)	Tahta
14:30 UTC+2

	Tanta	1–1 (3–4 p)	Kahrabaa Ismailia
14:30 UTC+2

== Bracket ==
The following is the bracket which the Egypt Cup resembles. Numbers in parentheses next to the match score represent the results of a penalty shoot-out.

Round of 32
Pyramids	2
El Dakhleya	0
National Bank	4
Port Fouad	1
Al Masry	2
Misr Lel Makkasa	1
Tala'ea El Gaish	0
Asyut Petroleum	1
ZED	5
Samannoud	1
Smouha	2
El Minya	0
Wadi Degla	0(2)
Kahraba Ismailia	0(3)
Ceramica Cleopatra	3
Abou Qir	2
Zamalek	3
Misr Insurance	2
El Sharkia Enppi	3
Proxy	2
El Gouna	4
Ittihad Al Shorta	1
Ghazl El Mahalla	1
Al Ittihad	2
Al Ahly	3
El Sekka El Hadid	0
Suez Petrojet	2^{a.e.t.}
Delphi	0
Al Mokawloon	1
We	0
Modern Sport	0
El Qanah	1

Round of 16
Pyramids
National Bank
Al Masry
Asyut Petroleum
ZED
Smouha
Kahraba Ismailia
Ceramica Cleopatra
Zamalek
El Sharkia Enppi
El Gouna
Al Ittihad
Al Ahly
Suez Petrojet
Al Mokawloon
El Qanah

Quarter-finals

Semi-finals

Final

== Matches ==
=== Round of 32 ===
7 November 2026 1	Pyramids	2–0	El Dakhleya	Cairo
20:00 UTC+2	Y. Obama 8'; M. Fathy 75'	Report		Stadium: Petrosport Stadium; Referee: Ahmed El Ghandour (Egypt)

5 November 2026 2	National Bank	4–1	Port Fouad	Alexandria
17:00 UTC+2	Rayyan 6'; K. Hamed 26'; M. Shalaby 17'; Ćeara 60'; S. Neymar (yellow card) 64' (yellow-red card) 86'	Report	M. Meteb 62'	Stadium: Borg El Arab Stadium; Referee: Mohamed Nasser Abbas (Egypt)

7 November 2026 3	Al Masry	2–1	Misr Lel Makkasa	Ismailia
17:00 UTC+2	Sharaf 20'; Ziani 70'	Report	S. Mahdy 51'	Stadium: New Suez Stadium; Referee: Mohamed Ayman (Egypt)

8 November 2026 4	Tala'ea El Gaish	0–1	Asyut Petroleum	Cairo
20:00 UTC+2	K. Abou Zaied (red card) 45'; E. El Sayed (red card) 81'	Report	C. C. Bodne 60'	Stadium: Gehaz El Reyada Stadium; Referee: Abdelaziz Elsayed (Egypt)

9 November 2026 5	ZED	5–1	Samannoud	Cairo
17:00 UTC+2	W. Farag 10'; A. El-Banoby 18'; M. Ouka 23'; A. Gouda 30'; R. Ahmed 86'	Report	S. Ismail 66'	Stadium: Petrosport Stadium; Referee: Mohamed Khaled Abdelfattah (Egypt)

6 November 2026 6	Smouha	2–0	El Minya	Alexandria
14:30 UTC+2	Badji 28', 45+2'	Report		Stadium: Borg El Arab Stadium; Referee: Mohamed Mamdouh (Egypt)

9 November 2026 7	Wadi Degla	0–0 (2–3 p)	Kahrabaa Ismailia	Ismailia
14:30 UTC+2	H. Hassan (penalty scored); M. Abdelrahim (penalty missed); O. Osama (penalty missed); A. Abdin (penalty missed); A. Farouk (penalty scored)	Report	A. Hamada (penalty missed); El Fayoumi (penalty scored); I. Abdelnaim (penalty scored); A. Abd Rabo (penalty missed); M. El Sayed (penalty scored)	Stadium: New Suez Stadium; Referee: Rashad Nassef (Egypt)

7 November 2026 8	Ceramica Cleopatra	3–2	Abou Qir	Alexandria
17:00 UTC+2	Gwargis 32', 65'; Gradišar 90+4'	Report	A. Hussein 53'; Fayez 61'	Stadium: Borg El Arab Stadium; Referee: Mahmoud Eldsoky(Egypt)

6 November 2026 9	Zamalek	3–2	Misr Insurance	Cairo
20:00 UTC+2	Shehata 45+4'; Sherif 53' (pen.); Kaied 86'	Report	Camara 42'; Esha 84'	Stadium: Cairo International Stadium; Referee: Amr Abdin (Egypt)

6 November 2026 10	El Sharkia Enppi	3–2	Proxy	Cairo
17:00 UTC+2	M. Hamdy 17' (pen.); H. Ghanem 38', 42'	Report	M. Felix 4' (pen.); M. Camavinga 40'	Stadium: Petrosport Stadium; Referee: Ahmed Abdallah (Egypt)

5 November 2026 11	El Gouna	4–1	Ittihad Al Shorta	El Gouna
14:30 UTC+2	Reda 10'; M. Mohsen 48' (pen.); Ojo 72'; Egbemba 87'	Report	A. Kamel 42'	Stadium: Khaled Bichara Stadium; Referee: Ahmed Nasser (Egypt)

4 November 2026 12	Ghazl El Mahalla	1–2	Al Ittihad	El Mahalla El Kubra
17:00 UTC+2	Arfaoui 17'; Rashdan (red card) 90+1'	Report	Ebuka 75' (pen.), 80'	Stadium: Ghazl El Mahalla Stadium; Referee: Tarek Magdy (Egypt)

7 November 2026 13	Al Ahly	3–0	El Sekka El Hadid	Cairo
20:00 UTC+2	Zizo 25', 36'; El Saaiy 78'	Report		Stadium: Cairo International Stadium; Referee: Walid Nagy (Egypt)

8 November 2026 14	Suez Petrojet	2–0 (a.e.t.)	Delphi	Ismailia
14:30 UTC+2	B. Mousa 101'; K. El Deeb 112'	Report		Stadium: New Suez Stadium; Referee: El Sayed Antar (Egypt)

10 November 2026 15	Al Mokawloon Al Arab	1–0	We	Cairo
17:00 UTC+2	S. Hussein 83'	Report		Stadium: Petrosport Stadium; Referee: Mohamed Fathallah (Egypt)

8 November 2026 16	Modern Sport	0–1	El Qanah	Alexandria
17:00 UTC+2		Report	Shalata 70'	Stadium: Borg El Arab Stadium; Referee: Ibrahim Mohamed (Egypt)

=== Round of 16 ===
10 January 2027 1	Pyramids	v	National Bank
17:00 UTC+2

18 November 2026 2	Al Masry	v	Asyut Petroleum
17:00 UTC+2

18 November 2026 3	ZED	v	Smouha
20:00 UTC+2

19 November 2026 4	Kahraba Ismailia	v	Ceramica Cleopatra
17:00 UTC+2

10 January 2027 5	Zamalek	v	El Sharkia Enppi
17:00 UTC+2

17 November 2026 6	El Gouna	0–1	Al Ittihad
17:00 UTC+2

10 January 2027 7	Al Ahly	v	Suez Petrojet
17:00 UTC+2

18 November 2026 8	Al Mokawloon Al Arab	v	El Qanah
17:00 UTC+2

=== Quarter-finals ===
1	Winner R16 Match 1	v	Winner R16 Match 2
17:00 UTC+2

2	Winner R16 Match 3	v	Winner R16 Match 4
17:00 UTC+2

3	Winner R16 Match 5	v	Winner R16 Match 6
17:00 UTC+2

4	Winner R16 Match 7	v	Winner R16 Match 8
17:00 UTC+2

=== Semi-finals ===
1	Winner QF1	v	Winner QF2
17:00 UTC+2

2	Winner QF3	v	Winner QF4
17:00 UTC+2

=== Final ===
	Winner SF1	v	Winner SF2	Cairo
20:00 UTC+2				Stadium: Cairo International Stadium

== Top scorers ==
Rank	Player	Club	Goals
1	(Iraq) Peter Gwargis	Ceramica Cleopatra	2
1	(Nigeria) John Ebuka	Ittihad Alexandria	2
1	(Egypt) Zizo	Al Ahly	2
1	(Egypt) Hossam Ghanem	Enppi	2
1	(Senegal) Pape Badji	Smouha	2
6	(Egypt) Karim Hamed	National Bank of Egypt	1
6	(Nigeria) Michael Egbemba	El Gouna	1
6	(Slovenia) Nejc Gradišar	Ceramica Cleopatra	1
6	(Egypt) Mohamed Reda	El Gouna	1
6	(Egypt) Omar El Saaiy	Al Ahly	1
