= Ahmed Reda Hashem =

Egyptian footballer (born 2000)

Ahmed Reda
Personal information
- Full name: Ahmed Reda Hashem Ahmed
- Date of birth: 19 February 2000 (age 26)
- Place of birth: Bilbeis, Sharqia, Egypt
- Height: 1.80 m (5 ft 11 in)
- Position: Defensive midfielder

Team information
- Current team: Al Ahly
- Number: 8

Youth career
- 2017–2021: Zamalek SC

Senior career*
Years	Team	Apps	(Gls)
2021–2025	Petrojet	9	(1)
2025–	Al Ahly	7	(2)
- * Club domestic league appearances and goals as of 13 May 2025

Ahmed Reda Hashem Ahmed (Arabic: أحمد رضا هاشم أحمد; born on the 19th of February 2000) is an Egyptian professional footballer who plays as a defensive midfielder for Egyptian Premier League club Al Ahly FC.

== Club career ==
Reda began his youth career at Zamalek in 2017, where he developed until 2021. He then moved to Petrojet, making his professional debut. During his time there, he helped Petrojet secure promotion by winning the Egyptian Second Division A in the 2023–24 season.

In January 2025, Reda transferred to Egyptian giants Al Ahly, where he quickly established himself as a defensive midfielder.

== Honours ==
Petrojet

- Egyptian Second Division A: 2023–24

Al Ahly

- Egyptian Premier League: 2024–25
