= Mohamed Abdallah El Hadad =

Egyptian footballer (born 2005)

Mohamed Abdallah
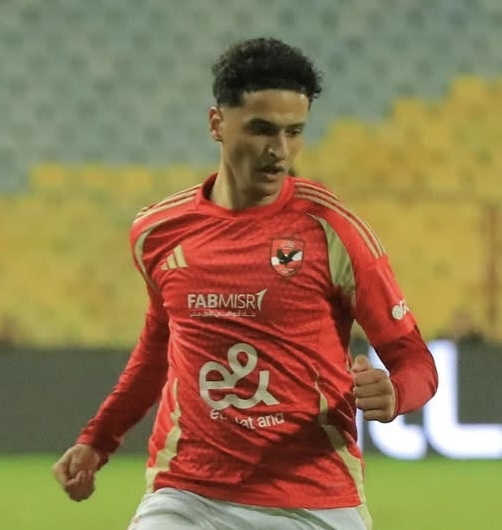
- Mohamed Abdallah in 2025

Personal information
- Full name: Mohamed Abdallah Ali Youssef El Hadad
- Date of birth: 18 October 2005 (age 21)
- Place of birth: Faqous, Sharqia, Egypt
- Height: 1.75 m (5 ft 9 in)
- Position: Winger

Team information
- Current team: Al Ahly
- Number: 38

Youth career
- –2024: Al Ahly

Senior career*
Years	Team	Apps	(Gls)
2023–	Al Ahly	3	(0)

International career
2023–	Egypt U20	3	(1)
- * Club domestic league appearances and goals as of 18 August 2024

Mohamed Abdallah Ali Youssef El Hadad (Arabic: محمد عبد الله; born 18 October 2005, in Faqous) is an Egyptian professional footballer who plays as a winger for Egyptian Premier League club Al Ahly and the Egypt U20.

== Honours ==
Al Ahly

- Egyptian Premier League: 2022–23, 2023–24
- CAF Champions League: 2023–24
- Egyptian Super Cup: 2024, 2025
- FIFA African–Asian–Pacific Cup: 2024
