= Hady Reyad =

Egyptian footballer (born 1998)

Personal information
- Date of birth: June 10, 1998 (age 28)
- Place of birth: Sherbin, Egypt
- Height: 1.87 m (6 ft 2 in)
- Position: Centre-back

Team information
- Current team: Al Ahly
- Number: 5

Youth career
- –2017: Sherbin
- 2017–2018: Wadi Degla

Senior career*
Years	Team	Apps	(Gls)
2017–2021	Wadi Degla	0	(0)
2019–2020	→ Haras El Hodoud (loan)	?	(?)
2020–2021	→ Kafr El Sheikh (loan)	?	(?)
2021–2026	Petrojet	37	(2)
2026–	Al Ahly	9	(1)
- * Club domestic league appearances and goals as of September 2026

Hady Reyad (born 10 June 1998) is an Egyptian professional footballer who plays as a centre-back for Egyptian Premier League club Al Ahly.

== Career ==
Reyad began his career playing in the lower tiers and youth ranks, including stints with Sherben before joining Wadi Degla's U21 side in January 2017. During his time with Wadi Degla, he was sent out on loan to Haras El Hodoud in 2019 and Kafr El Sheikh in 2020.

In September 2021, Reyad transferred permanently to Petrojet, where he established himself in defense and made regular appearances in the Egyptian Premier League.

On 27 January 2026, Reyad signed for Al Ahly on a contract running until June 2030, for a reported transfer fee of €480k.
