= Baron Ochieng =

Kenyan footballer

Personal information
- Full name: Baron Ochieng
- Date of birth: 29 December 2005 (age 20)
- Place of birth: Nairobi, Kenya
- Height: 1.72 m (5 ft 8 in)
- Positions: Right-back; defender

Youth career
- Kesa Soka Academy

Senior career*
Years	Team	Apps	(Gls)
2021–2023	Dimba Patriots FC		
2023–2025	Sofapaka FC		
2025–2026	Zamalek SC		

International career^{‡}
2024–2025	Kenya U20	2	(0)
- * Club domestic league appearances and goals as of (as of 2025) ‡ National team caps and goals as of (as of 2025)

Baron Ochieng is a Kenyan footballer, and the Kenya U20.

== Club career ==
He came up through youth / local football in Nairobi, including time at Kesa Soka Academy. He began his senior career with Dimba Patriots FC, a third tier Kenyan club in Nairobi. In 2023, he moved to Sofapaka FC in the Kenyan Premier League till mid 2025 before making a move to Zamalek SC on a four-year in September 2025.

== International career ==
At youth level, Baron represented Kenya at both the U18 and U20 teams. He served as assistant captain of the Kenya U20 team that featured in the 2025 U-20 Africa Cup of Nations in Cairo, Egypt, in May 2025.

Right after that tournament, Baron was called up to the senior Kenya team for the 2026 FIFA World Cup qualifiers against Côte d'Ivoire and Burundi.
