= Aqtay Abdallah =

Egyptian footballer (born 2003)

Personal information
- Full name: Aqtay Abdallah
- Date of birth: 1 June 2003 (age 23)
- Place of birth: Kafr El Sheikh, Egypt
- Height: 1.82 m (6 ft 0 in)
- Position: Striker

Team information
- Current team: Al Ahly

Youth career
- 2023–2025: Tanta

Senior career*
Years	Team	Apps	(Gls)
2025–2026	Enppi	12	(4)
2026–	Al Ahly	0	(0)
- * Club domestic league appearances and goals

Aqtay Abdallah (Arabic: اقطاي عبدالله; born 1 June 2003) is an Egyptian professional footballer who plays as a striker for Egyptian Premier League club Al Ahly.

== Career statistics ==
=== Club ===
As of 1 July 2026

Appearances and goals by club, season and competition
Club	Season	League			Cup		Continental		Other		Total	
Club	Season	Division	Apps	Goals	Apps	Goals	Apps	Goals	Apps	Goals	Apps	Goals
Enppi	2025–26	EPL	12	4	4	0	0	0	8	2	24	6
Career total			12	4	4	0	0	0	8	2	24	6
