= Amr El Gazar =

Egyptian footballer (born 2000)

Personal information
- Full name: Amr El Gazar
- Date of birth: 22 September 1999 (age 27)
- Place of birth: Faqous, Sharqia, Egypt
- Height: 1.81 m (5 ft 11 in)
- Position: Centre-back

Team information
- Current team: Al Ahly
- Number: 26

Senior career*
Years	Team	Apps	(Gls)
2023–2025	Ghazl El Mahalla	25	(2)
2025–2026	National Bank	11	(0)
2026–	Al Ahly	3	(0)
- * Club domestic league appearances and goals as of 03 September 2026

Amr El Gazar (Arabic: عمرو الجزار; born 20 September 1999) is an Egyptian professional footballer who plays as a centre-back for Egyptian Premier League club Al Ahly.
