= 2026 Egyptian Super Cup =

Egyptian football competition

Egyptian Super Cup

Tournament details
- Host country: TBA
- Dates: January 2027
- Teams: 4

The 2026 Egyptian Super Cup, officially the National Bank Of Egypt Egyptian Super Cup for sponsorship purposes, was the 24th edition of the Egyptian Super Cup, an annual football competition contested by teams that were successful in the preceding season of Egyptian football.

== Format ==
The tournament consists of four teams: the winners of all three major football competitions in Egypt from the preceding season (Egyptian Premier League, Egypt Cup and Egyptian League Cup), while the fourth team is invited by receiving a 'golden card' from the Egyptian Football Association.

Fixtures were announced in January 2027.

=== Qualified teams ===
The following four teams qualified for the tournament.

Team	Method of qualification
Zamalek	2025–26 Egyptian Premier League winners
Pyramids	2025–26 Egypt Cup winners
Al Masry	2025–26 Egyptian League Cup winners
Al Ahly	Golden card recipient

== Bracket ==
Semi-finals
January 2027
Zamalek
Al Masry
January 2027
Pyramids
Al Ahly

Final
January 2027
Third place match
January 2027

== Matches ==
All times are GST (UTC+4).

=== Semi-finals ===
Al Ahly	v	Pyramids

Zamalek	v	Al Masry

=== Third place match ===
Loser SF 1	v	Loser SF 2

=== Final ===
Winner SF 1	v	Winner SF 2
