= Mohamed Seha =

Egyptian footballer (born 2001)

Mohamed Seha محمد سيحا
Personal information
- Full name: Mohamed Ahmed Elsayed Abdou
- Date of birth: 1 May 2001 (age 25)
- Place of birth: Zagazig, Egypt
- Height: 1.95 m (6 ft 5 in)
- Position: Goalkeeper

Team information
- Current team: Al Masry SC on loan from Al Ahly
- Number: 26

Youth career
- 2016–2022: Al Mokawloon Al Arab

Senior career*
Years	Team	Apps	(Gls)
2022–2025	Al Mokawloon Al Arab	1	(0)
2024–2025	→ Haras El Hodoud (loan)	14	(0)
2025–	Al Ahly	0	(0)
2026-	Al Masry SC	0	(0)

International career^{‡}
2023–2024	Egypt U23	1	(0)
Medal record
Representing Egypt
U-23 Africa Cup of Nations
Runner-up	Morocco 2023	U-23 Team
- * Club domestic league appearances and goals as of 13:07, 23 August 2026 (UTC) ‡ National team caps and goals as of 23:14, 10 May 2025 (UTC)

Mohamed Ahmed Elsayed Abdou (Arabic: محمد أحمد السيد عبده; born 1 May 2001) commonly known as Seha (Arabic: سيحا), is an Egyptian professional footballer who plays as a goalkeeper for Egyptian Premier League club Al Masry SC on loan from Al Ahly
