= Tawfik Mohamed =

Egyptian footballer (born 2000)

Personal information
- Full name: Tawfik Mohamed
- Date of birth: 1 January 2000 (age 26)
- Place of birth: Egypt
- Position: Left-back

Team information
- Current team: Al Ahly
- Number: 24

Senior career*
Years	Team	Apps	(Gls)
2022–2026	Petrojet	44	(0)
2026–	Al Ahly	0	(0)
- * Club domestic league appearances and goals as of 03 September 2026

Tawfik Mohamed (Arabic: توفيق محمد; born 1 January 2000) is an Egyptian professional footballer who plays as a left-back for Egyptian Premier League club Al Ahly.
