= 2026–27 Egyptian League Cup =

Egyptian League Cup
Tournament details
- Dates: 7 October 2026 –
- Teams: 20

The Egyptian Professional Clubs League Cup 2027, officially known as the Egypt Capital Cup, is the Sixth edition of the competition. It features only Egyptian Premier League clubs., dividing the 20 teams into four groups of five. The winner earns qualification to the 2027-28 Egyptian Super Cup.

== Group stage ==
=== Group A ===
| Pos | Team | Pld | W | D | L | GF | GA | GD | Pts | Qualification |
|---|---|---|---|---|---|---|---|---|---|---|
| 1 | Wadi Degla | 2 | 2 | 0 | 0 | 2 | 0 | +2 | 6 | Advance to the quarter-finals |
| 2 | ZED | 2 | 1 | 1 | 0 | 3 | 0 | +3 | 4 | Advance to the quarter-finals |
| 3 | Tala'ea El Gaish | 1 | 0 | 1 | 0 | 0 | 0 | 0 | 1 | |
| 4 | Al Ittihad | 1 | 0 | 0 | 1 | 0 | 1 | −1 | 0 | |
| 5 | Zamalek | 2 | 0 | 0 | 2 | 0 | 4 | −4 | 0 | |

Updated to match(es) played on 15 November 2026. Source: EFL
Rules for classification: Group stage tiebreakers
7 October 2026

| Zamalek | 0–3 | ZED |

8 October 2026

| Al Ittihad | 0–1 | Wadi Degla |

2 November 2026
5:00 PM

| Wadi Degla | – | Zamalek |

2 December 2026
8:00 PM

| ZED | – | Tala'ea El Gaish |

13 January 2027
8:00 PM

| ZED | – | Wadi Degla |

14 January 2027
8:00 PM

| Tala'ea El Gaish | – | Al Ittihad |

19 January 2027
8:00 PM

| Zamalek | – | Al Ittihad |

21 January 2027
8:00 PM

| Wadi Degla | – | Tala'ea El Gaish |

27 February 2027
9:30 PM

| Al Ittihad | – | ZED |

27 February 2027
9:30 PM

| Tala'ea El Gaish | – | Zamalek |

=== Group B ===
| Pos | Team | Pld | W | D | L | GF | GA | GD | Pts | Qualification |
|---|---|---|---|---|---|---|---|---|---|---|
| 1 | Pyramids | 2 | 2 | 0 | 0 | 4 | 2 | +2 | 6 | Advance to the quarter-finals |
| 2 | Modern Sport | 2 | 1 | 0 | 1 | 2 | 1 | +1 | 3 | Advance to the quarter-finals |
| 3 | Olympic El Qanah | 2 | 1 | 0 | 1 | 3 | 3 | 0 | 3 | |
| 4 | Smouha | 1 | 0 | 0 | 1 | 0 | 1 | −1 | 0 | |
| 5 | National Bank | 1 | 0 | 0 | 1 | 0 | 2 | −2 | 0 | |

Updated to match(es) played on 15 November 2026. Source: EFL
Rules for classification: Group stage tiebreakers
7 October 2026

| Pyramids | 3–2 | Olympic El Qanah |

8 October 2026

| Modern Sport | 2–0 | National Bank |

3 November 2026
8:00 PM

| Smouha | – | Pyramids |

3 November 2026
5:00 PM

| Olympic El Qanah | – | Modern Sport |

12 January 2027
5:00 PM

| National Bank | – | Smouha |

12 January 2027
8:00 PM

| Pyramids | – | Modern Sport |

19 January 2027
5:00 PM

| National Bank | – | Pyramids |

19 January 2027
8:00 PM

| Smouha | – | Olympic El Qanah |

14 February 2027
9:30 PM

| Olympic El Qanah | – | National Bank |

16 February 2027
9:30 PM

| Modern Sport | – | Smouha |

=== Group C ===
| Pos | Team | Pld | W | D | L | GF | GA | GD | Pts | Qualification |
|---|---|---|---|---|---|---|---|---|---|---|
| 1 | Al Ahly | 2 | 2 | 0 | 0 | 6 | 0 | +6 | 6 | Advance to the quarter-finals |
| 2 | Al Mokawloon Al Arab | 2 | 1 | 0 | 1 | 2 | 1 | +1 | 3 | Advance to the quarter-finals |
| 3 | Sharkia Enppi | 1 | 0 | 1 | 0 | 0 | 0 | 0 | 1 | |
| 4 | Asyut Petroleum | 2 | 0 | 1 | 1 | 0 | 5 | −5 | 1 | |
| 5 | El Gouna | 1 | 0 | 0 | 1 | 0 | 2 | −2 | 0 | |

Updated to match(es) played on 15 November 2026. Source: EFL
Rules for classification: Group stage tiebreakers
7 October 2026

| Asyut Petroleum | 0–5 | Al Ahly SC |

8 October 2026

| Al Mokawloon Al Arab | 2–0 | El Gouna FC |

2 November 2026
8:00 PM

| Al Ahly SC | 2–0 | Al Mokawloon Al Arab |

3 November 2026
5:00 PM

| Sharkia Enppi | – | Asyut Petroleum |

13 January 2027
5:00 PM

| El Gouna FC | – | Sharkia Enppi |

14 January 2027
5:00 PM

| Asyut Petroleum | – | Al Mokawloon Al Arab |

20 January 2027
5:00 PM

| El Gouna FC | – | Asyut Petroleum |

20 January 2027
8:00 PM

| Sharkia Enppi | – | Al Ahly SC |

15 February 2027
9:30 PM

| Al Ahly SC | – | El Gouna FC |

16 February 2027
9:30 PM

| Al Mokawloon Al Arab | – | Sharkia Enppi |

=== Group D ===
| Pos | Team | Pld | W | D | L | GF | GA | GD | Pts | Qualification |
|---|---|---|---|---|---|---|---|---|---|---|
| 1 | Al Masry | 2 | 1 | 1 | 0 | 1 | 0 | +1 | 4 | Advance to the quarter-finals |
| 2 | Ceramica Cleopatra | 2 | 1 | 0 | 1 | 2 | 1 | +1 | 3 | Advance to the quarter-finals |
| 3 | Ghazl Al Mahalla | 1 | 0 | 1 | 0 | 1 | 1 | 0 | 1 | |
| 4 | Suez Petrojet | 1 | 0 | 1 | 0 | 0 | 0 | 0 | 1 | |
| 5 | Abou Qir | 2 | 0 | 1 | 1 | 1 | 3 | −2 | 1 | |

Updated to match(es) played on 15 November 2026. Source: EFL
Rules for classification: Group stage tiebreakers
7 October 2026

| Ceramica Cleopatra | 0–1 | Al Masry SC |

8 October 2026

| Ghazl Al Mahalla | 1–1 | Abou Qir |

3 November 2026
8:00 PM

| Abou Qir | – | Ceramica Cleopatra |

3 December 2026
8:00 PM

| Al Masry SC | – | Suez Petrojet |

13 January 2027
8:00 PM

| Suez Petrojet | – | Abou Qir |

14 January 2027
8:00 PM

| Ceramica Cleopatra | – | Ghazl Al Mahalla |

21 January 2027
5:00 PM

| Abou Qir | – | Al Masry SC |

21 January 2027
8:00 PM

| Ghazl Al Mahalla | – | Suez Petrojet |

14 February 2027
9:30 PM

| Suez Petrojet | – | Ceramica Cleopatra |

15 February 2027
9:30 PM

| Al Masry SC | – | Ghazl Al Mahalla |
