= El Sharkia Enppi SC =

- Full name: El Sharkia Enppi SC
- Founded: 13 July 2026; 4 months ago as El Sharkia Enppi SC
- Ground: Petro Sport Stadium
- Capacity: 16,000
- Chairman: Ayman El-Sherei
- Manager: Mohamed Barakat
- League: Egyptian Premier League
- 2025–26: Egyptian Premier League, 6th of 21
- Website: elsharkiaenppi.com

El Sharkia Enppi SC (Arabic: نادي الشرقية إنبي) is an Egyptian football club representing Sharqia Governorate and competing in the Egyptian Premier League. The club was established following an investment and administrative agreement between Sharkia SC and ENPPI SC to establish a company specializing in the management and investment of football activities.
