= Ghazl El Mahalla Stadium =

Coordinates: 30°57′38″N 31°10′22″E

- ستاد غزل المحلة
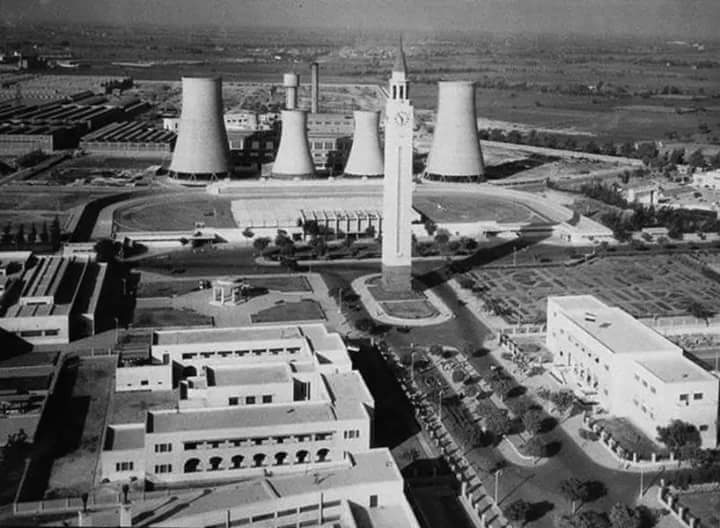
- Interactive map of Ghazl El Mahalla Stadium
- Full name: Ghazl El Mahalla Stadium
- Location: El Mahalla El Kubra, Egypt
- Owner: Ghazl El Mahalla
- Capacity: 20,000
- Surface: Grass
- Record attendance: 30,000

Construction
- Opened: 1947

Tenants
- Ghazl El Mahalla; Baladeyet El Mahalla; Said El Mahalla; 1974 Africa Cup of Nations

Ghazl El Mahalla Stadium (Arabic: ستاد غزل المحلة) is a multi-purpose stadium located in El Mahalla El Kubra, Egypt. It is used mainly for football and serves as the home stadium of Ghazl El Mahalla, but it also hosts Baladeyet El Mahalla and Said El Mahalla home matches. The stadium hosted three matches during the 1974 Africa Cup of Nations. The stadium has a seating capacity of 20,000.
