= Khaled Bichara Stadium =

Football stadium in Egypt

- Interactive map of Khaled Bichara Stadium
- Former names: El Gouna Stadium
- Location: El Gouna, Egypt
- Coordinates: 27°21′36″N 33°39′36″E
- Capacity: 12,000
- Surface: grass

Construction
- Opened: 2009
- Renovated: 2018

Tenant
- El Gouna

Khaled Bichara Stadium (Egyptian Arabic: ستاد خالد بشارة), previously known as El Gouna Stadium, is a multi-use stadium used mostly for football matches in El Gouna, Egypt, which has a seating capacity of 12,000. It is the home stadium of El Gouna. On 15 February 2020, El Gouna announced that the stadium has been renamed to Khaled Bichara Stadium, after former club CEO Khaled Bichara who died in a car accident in late January 2020.
