= Petrosport Stadium =

Stadium of the ENPPI, New Cairo, Egypt

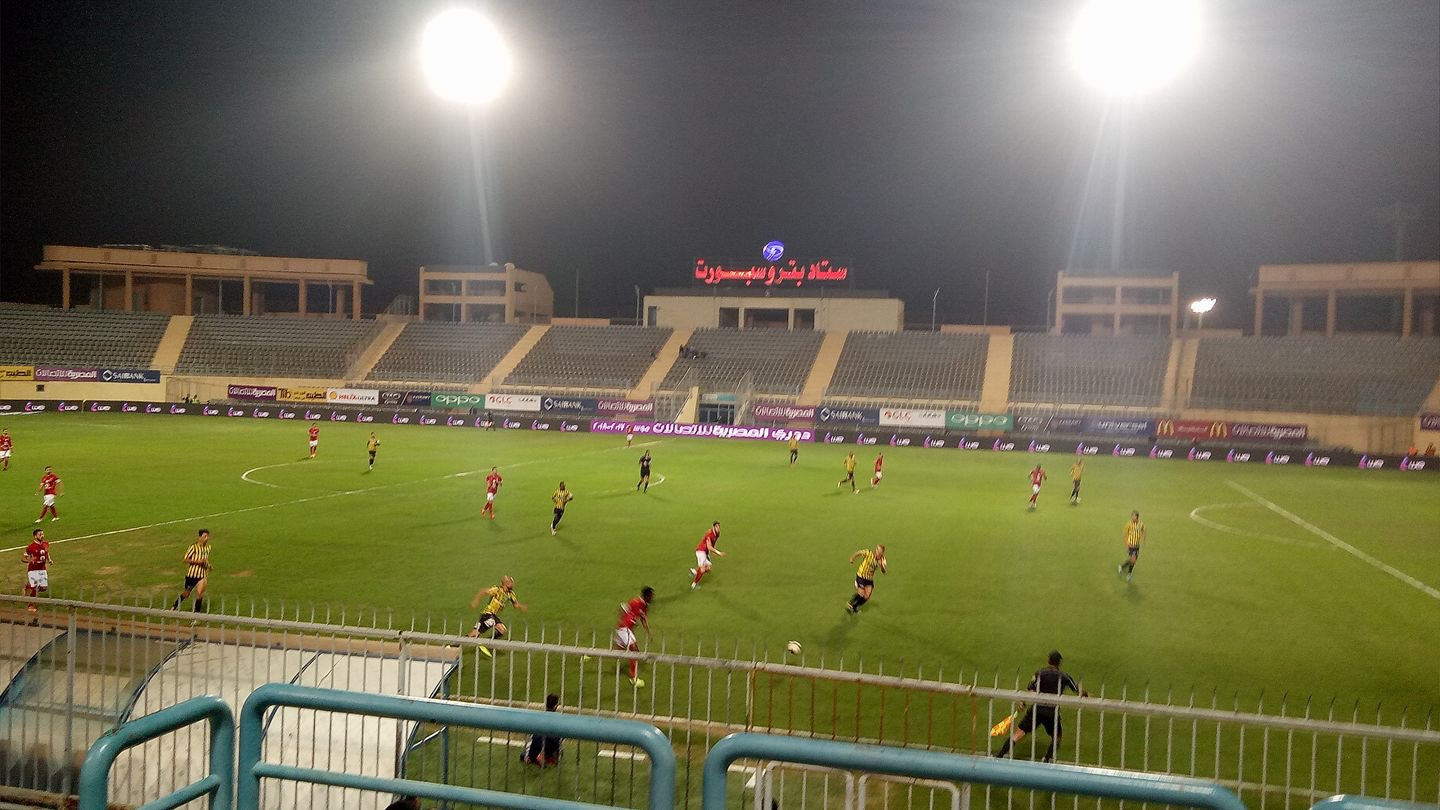
- Interactive map of Petrosport Stadium
- Location: New Cairo, Egypt
- Coordinates: 30.027°N 31.446°E
- Capacity: 16,000 (all seated)
- Surface: Grass

Construction
- Opened: 2006

Tenants
- ENPPI; Wadi Degla SC

The Petrosport Stadium (Egyptian Arabic: استاد بتروسبورت, Egyptian Pronunciation: Estad Petrosport) is a multi-use stadium with an all-seated capacity of 16,000 located in New Cairo, Cairo Governorate, Egypt. It was completed in 2006. It is the home for ENPPI, Wadi Degla SC and other Petrol clubs in Egypt.
