= National Bank of Egypt SC =

Association football club in Cairo, Egypt

NBE SC
- Full name: National Bank of Egypt Sporting Club
- Short name: NBE
- Founded: 1951; 75 years ago
- Ground: Cairo International Stadium
- Capacity: 75,000
- Owner: National Bank of Egypt
- Chairman: Ashraf Nassar
- Manager: Tarek Mostafa
- League: Egyptian Premier League
- 2024–25: 5th

National Bank of Egypt Sporting Club (Arabic: نادي البنك الأهلي المصري الرياضي) is an Egyptian football club based in Cairo. The club was founded in 1951.

The National Bank of Egypt SC is mainly known for its professional football team, which currently plays in the Egyptian Premier League, the highest tier in the Egyptian football league system.

== History ==
The club was founded in August 1951. Essam Baheeg was the team's coach in the 1970s. In the 2018–19 season, they finished 2nd in Third Division Promotion Group B to compete at the 2019–20 Egyptian Second Division, where they finished 1st in Group A, to be promoted to the 2020–21 Egyptian Premier League for the first time in their history.

== Players ==
=== Current squad ===
As of 8 April, 2026

Note: Flags indicate national team as defined under FIFA eligibility rules; some limited exceptions apply. Players may hold more than one non-FIFA nationality.

| No. | Pos. | Nation | Player |
|---|---|---|---|
| 1 | GK | EGY | Ahmed Sobhi |
| 2 | DF | EGY | Mohamed Nasr |
| 6 | DF | EGY | Mahmoud El-Gazzar |
| 7 | DF | EGY | Hesham Salah |
| 8 | MF | EGY | Rashad El Metwaly |
| 9 | FW | EGY | Osama Faisal |
| 10 | FW | EGY | Sayed Abdallah |
| 11 | FW | EGY | Mostafa Shalaby |
| 12 | DF | EGY | Ahmed Meteb |
| 13 | DF | EGY | Shefo |
| 14 | MF | EGY | Ali Hamdi |
| 15 | MF | ALG | Salah Bouchama |
| 17 | MF | EGY | Mody Naser |
| 18 | FW | EGY | Karim Hamed |

| No. | Pos. | Nation | Player |
|---|---|---|---|
| 20 | DF | EGY | Amir Medhat |
| 21 | MF | EGY | Ahmed Madbouly |
| 22 | FW | BRA | Anderson Ceará |
| 23 | FW | EGY | Oufa |
| 24 | MF | EGY | Mostafa Dowidar |
| 25 | MF | EGY | Bencharki |
| 27 | GK | EGY | Abdelaziz El Balouti |
| 28 | DF | EGY | Hatem Sukar |
| 29 | FW | EGY | Ahmed Yasser Rayyan |
| 30 | FW | TOG | Yaw Annor |
| 31 | GK | EGY | Ahmed Tarek Soliman |
| 33 | DF | BFA | Cyril Dao |
| 70 | MF | EGY | Mohamed Reda |
| 77 | MF | EGY | Mohamed Gamal |
