= Modern Sport FC =

Association football club in Cairo, Egypt

Modern Sport
- Full name: Modern Sport Football Club نادي مودرن سبورت لكرة القدم
- Short name: MOD
- Founded: 2011; 15 years ago as Coca-Cola FC; 2 September 2021; 5 years ago as Future FC; 22 August 2023; 3 years ago as Modern Future FC; 2 July 2024; 2 years ago as Modern Sport FC
- Ground: Al Salam Stadium
- Capacity: 30,000
- Chairman: Walid Zaki
- Manager: Mohamed Amine Benhachem
- League: Egyptian Premier League
- 2025–26: 15th

Modern Sport Football Club (Arabic: نادي مودرن سبورت لكرة القدم), formerly known as Modern Future FC, Future FC and Coca-Cola FC, is an Egyptian professional football club based in Cairo, Egypt. The club plays in the Egyptian Premier League, the highest league in the Egyptian football league system.

== History ==
The club was owned by the Egyptian branch of The Coca-Cola Company since its establishment in 2011 until 2021. Coca-Cola's last season under that name witnessed their promotion to the 2021–22 Egyptian Premier League for the first time in their history, as they finished top of their group in the 2020–21 Egyptian Second Division.

On 2 September 2021, Future company for sports investments announced the acquisition of the club for a reported fee of £E80 million (approximately €4 million), and renamed the club to Future FC. In their first season in the Premier League, Future finished 5th in the league but still qualified to the CAF Confederation Cup as the league was not finished by the CAF deadline. In the Confederation Cup, the club were eliminated in the group stage due to a mistake in Ahmed Refaat registration; hence, their results were ruled forfeited in all matches in which this player participated.

In the 2022–23 season, Future managed to win the inaugural Egyptian League Cup after a 5–1 win over Ghazl El Mahalla in the final. Meanwhile, they finished fourth in the league to qualify to the Confederation Cup for the second consecutive season.

In August 2023, the club had new ownership and was renamed to Modern Future FC ahead of the 2023–24 season. On 2 July 2024, it was officially announced that the club had changed its name to Modern Sport FC, after receiving approval from all relevant official authorities and was sanctioned by the Egyptian Olympic Committee's as published on 27 May earlier that year.

== Current squad ==
As of 22 September 2026

Note: Flags indicate national team as defined under FIFA eligibility rules; some limited exceptions apply. Players may hold more than one non-FIFA nationality.

No.	Pos.	Nation	Player
3	DF	EGY	Sharkia
4	DF	EGY	Khaled Reda
5	DF	EGY	Tarek Mohamed
8	MF	EGY	Mohamed Sabry
9	FW	EGY	Mahmoud Mamdouh
11	DF	EGY	Walid Mostafa
12	MF	EGY	Ahmed Youssef
13	GK	EGY	Ahmed Yehia
14	MF	EGY	Ahmed Mostafa
15	DF	EGY	Mostafa Ashraf
16	GK	EGY	Karim Emad
17	MF	EGY	Abdelrahman Shika
18	GK	EGY	Mahmoud El Zanfaly
19	MF	EGY	Mohamed Mosaad
20	DF	EGY	Mahmoud El Halawani
22	MF	EGY	Ali Zazaa

No.	Pos.	Nation	Player
27	MF	EGY	Ghanam Mohamed (captain)
29	FW	GHA	Michael Ephson
33	DF	EGY	Hamdi Marcelo
37	FW	EGY	Youssef Ali
38	MF	CMR	Arnold Eba
77	MF	EGY	Ali Fawzi
88	MF	EGY	El Limby
90	FW	EGY	Mohamed Gharib
98	FW	EGY	Kamel Kaboria
99	GK	EGY	Mostafa Makhlouf
—	DF	EGY	Karim Yehia
—	FW	NGR	Ismail Ayodele
—	DF	EGY	Adham Nabil
—	DF	EGY	Mostafa Gamal
—	GK	EGY	Sayed Sobhy
—	FW	EGY	Seif Oufa

== Performance in CAF competitions ==
- FR = First round
- SR = Second round

Season	Competition	Round	Country	Club	Home	Away	Aggregate
2022–23	CAF Confederation Cup	FR	Uganda	BUL Jinja	1–0	0–0	1–0
2022–23	CAF Confederation Cup	SR	Sierra Leone	Kallon	4–0	2–0	6–0

== Honours ==
- Egyptian League Cup
  - Champions (1): 2022
