= 2023–24 El Gouna FC season =

El Gouna FC
2023–24 season
- Manager: Alaa Abdelaal
- Stadium: Khaled Bichara Stadium
- Egyptian Premier League: 12th
- Egypt Cup: Quarter-finals
- Egyptian League Cup: Quarter-finals

The 2023–24 El Gouna FC season was the club's 21st season in existence and the first season back in the top flight of Egyptian football. In addition to the domestic league, El Gouna participated in this season's editions of the Egypt Cup, and the League Cup.

== Transfers ==
=== In ===
Pos.	Player	Transferred from	Fee	Date	Source
MF	(Morocco) Ahmed Belhadji	(Egypt) Ceramica Cleopatra	Loan	14 September 2023	

=== Out ===
Pos.	Player	Transferred to	Fee	Date	Source
MF	(Egypt) Karim Tarek	(Egypt) Tala'ea El Gaish		7 August 2023	
MF	(Morocco) Ahmed Belhadji	(Egypt) Ceramica Cleopatra	Loan return	1 January 2024	

== Pre-season and friendlies ==
Win Draw Loss

6 September 2023 Friendly	Ismaily (Egypt)	0–1	(Egypt) El Gouna	Ismailia
			50'	Stadium: Ismailia Stadium

9 September 2023 Friendly	Future (Egypt)	1–1	(Egypt) El Gouna	Cairo
				Stadium: Al Salam Stadium

== Competitions ==
=== Overall record ===
Competition	First match	Last match	Starting round	Final position	Record							
Competition	First match	Last match	Starting round	Final position	Pld	W	D	L	GF	GA	GD	Win %
Egyptian Premier League	20 September 2023	18 August 2024	Matchday 1	12th	34	9	12	13	32	44	−12	26.47
Egypt Cup	31 May 2024	21 August 2024	Round of 32	Quarter-finals	2	0	1	1	1	5	−4	0.00
Egyptian League Cup	10 January 2024	31 January 2024	Group stage	Quarter-finals	4	1	2	1	6	5	+1	25.00
Total					40	10	15	15	39	54	−15	25.00

Source: Competitions

=== Egyptian Premier League ===
==== League table ====
Pos	Team	Pld	W	D	L	GF	GA	GD	Pts
10	Tala'ea El Gaish	34	10	12	12	30	40	−10	42
11	Al Ittihad	34	9	14	11	30	42	−12	41
12	El Gouna	34	9	12	13	32	44	−12	39
13	National Bank of Egypt	34	9	9	16	46	45	+1	36
14	Ismaily	34	7	12	15	33	43	−10	33 (Note: Tied on head-to-head points (3). Head-to-head goal difference: Ismaily +1, Pharco –1.)

Source: Soccerway
Rules for classification: 1) Points; 2) Head-to-head points; 3) Head-to-head goal difference; 4) Goal difference; 5) Goals scored; 6) Play-off tie.
(Note: Head-to-head records are used for final standings only)

==== Results summary ====
Overall								Home						Away					
Pld	W	D	L	GF	GA	GD	Pts	W	D	L	GF	GA	GD	W	D	L	GF	GA	GD
26	7	10	9	27	36	−9	31	4	5	5	15	18	−3	3	5	4	12	18	−6

Last updated: 17 June 2024.

==== Results by round ====
Round	1
Ground	A
Result	D
Position	10

A = Away; H = Home; W = Win; D = Draw; L = Loss; P = Postponed

==== Matches ====
The league fixtures were unveiled on 11 September 2023.

20 September 2023 1	Smouha	1–1	El Gouna

27 September 2023 2	El Gouna	0–1	ZED

6 October 2023 3	Al Ittihad	2–2	El Gouna

28 October 2023 5	Pharco	0–1	El Gouna

4 November 2023 6	El Gouna	2–0	El Dakhleya

11 November 2023 4	El Gouna	1–1	Al Ahly

30 November 2023 7	Tala'ea El Gaish	1–1	El Gouna

14 December 2023 9	National Bank	2–3	El Gouna

25 December 2023 10	El Gouna	1–2	ENPPI

13 February 2024 12	El Gouna	2–2	Al Masry

20 February 2024 13	Ceramica Cleopatra	1–1	El Gouna

26 February 2024 14	El Gouna	0–0	Ismaily

8 March 2024 16	Baladiyat El Mahalla	1–2	El Gouna

12 March 2024 15	El Gouna	3–2	Zamalek

3 April 2024 17	El Gouna	1–2	Al Mokawloon Al Arab

9 April 2024 8	El Gouna	0–4	Pyramids

17 April 2024 18	El Gouna	1–0	Smouha

22 April 2024 19	ZED	3–0	El Gouna

27 April 2024 20	El Gouna	2–1	Al Ittihad

4 May 2024 21	Al Ahly	3–0	El Gouna

10 May 2024 22	El Gouna	1–2	Pharco

15 May 2024 23	El Dakhleya	0–0	El Gouna

21 May 2024 24	El Gouna	0–0	Tala'ea El Gaish

27 May 2024 25	Pyramids	1–0	El Gouna

13 June 2024 11	Modern Future	3–1	El Gouna

17 June 2024 26	El Gouna	1–1	National Bank

22 June 2024 27	ENPPI	1–0	El Gouna

27 June 2024 28	El Gouna	0–2	Modern Future

1 July 2024 29	Al Masry	2–1	El Gouna

7 July 2024 30	El Gouna	0–0	Ceramica Cleopatra

22 July 2024 31	Ismaily	1–1	El Gouna

2 August 2024 32	Zamalek	1–0	El Gouna

13 August 2024 33	El Gouna	2–1	Baladiyat El Mahalla

18 August 2024 34	Al Mokawloon Al Arab	0–1	El Gouna

=== Egypt Cup ===
31 May 2024 Round of 32	Baladiyat El Mahalla	1–1 (4–5 p)	El Gouna

8 August 2024 Round of 16	Tersana	0–0 (0–2 p)	El Gouna

21 August 2024 Quarter-finals	Pyramids	4–0	El Gouna

=== League Cup ===
10 January 2024	El Gouna	3–1	National Bank of Egypt	El Gouna
15:00	Moka 48' (pen.); Magdy 61', 76'	Report	Bambo 25'	Stadium: Khaled Bichara Stadium; Referee: Ahmed Gamal

15 January 2024	Al Mokawloon Al Arab	1–1	El Gouna	Cairo
15:00	Farag 62'	Report	Shousha 54' (pen.)	Stadium: Osman Ahmed Osman Stadium; Referee: Hamada El Qalawi

26 January 2024	Al Masry	2–1	El Gouna	Alexandria
16:00	El Shamy 40'; Gaber 45'	Report	El Sabahi 69'	Stadium: Borg El Arab Stadium; Referee: Mahmoud Wafa

==== Knockout stage ====
31 January 2024 Quarter-finals	Tala'ea El Gaish	1–1 (6–5 p)	El Gouna	Cairo
16:30	Abdel Rahman 27'	Report	Magdy 70'	Stadium: Gehaz El Reyada Stadium; Referee: Mohamed El Ghazi
	Penalties
	Okwara (penalty scored); Meteb (penalty scored); Samir (penalty missed); Wahid (penalty scored); Abdel Rahman (penalty scored); Diawara (penalty scored); Hany (penalty scored)		(penalty scored) Shousha; (penalty scored) Randrianantenaina; (penalty scored) Mahmoud; (penalty missed) Emad; (penalty scored) Abdel Rasoul; (penalty scored) Etouga; (penalty missed) El Deghemy
