= 2023–24 Ceramica Cleopatra FC season =

Ceramica Cleopatra FC
2023–24 season
- Manager: Ayman Al Ramadi
- Stadium: Cairo International Stadium
- Egyptian Premier League: 8th
- Egypt Cup: Round of 16
- League Cup: Winners
- Egyptian Super Cup: Fourth place
- Top goalscorer: Sodiq Awujoola (11)

The 2023–24 Ceramica Cleopatra FC season was the club's 17th season in existence and the fourth consecutive season in the top flight of Egyptian football. In addition to the domestic league, Ceramica Cleopatra participated in this season's editions of the Egypt Cup, the League Cup, and the Egyptian Super Cup.

== Transfers ==
=== In ===
Pos.	Player	Transferred from	Fee	Date	Source
DF	(Egypt) Saad Samir	(Egypt) Al Ahly	Free	10 August 2023	
MF	(Morocco) Ahmed Belhadji	(Egypt) Aswan	€91,000	14 September 2023	
MF	(Morocco) Ahmed Belhadji	(Egypt) El Gouna	Loan return	1 January 2024	

=== Out ===
Pos.	Player	Transferred to	Fee	Date	Source
DF	(Palestine) Musab Al-Battat	(Palestine) Shabab Al-Dhahiriya	Free	1 July 2023	
MF	(Algeria) Ahmed Kendouci	(Egypt) Al Ahly	Loan	27 August 2023	
MF	(Morocco) Ahmed Belhadji	(Egypt) El Gouna	Loan	14 September 2023	

== Pre-season and friendlies ==
Win Draw Loss

11 September 2023 Friendly	Zamalek (Egypt)	0–3	(Egypt) Ceramica Cleopatra	Cairo
17:00 UTC+3			Toni 5'; Ibrahim 45'; Ebuka 87'	Stadium: Sub-field of the Air Defense Stadium

== Competitions ==
=== Overall record ===
Competition	First match	Last match	Starting round	Final position	Record							
Competition	First match	Last match	Starting round	Final position	Pld	W	D	L	GF	GA	GD	Win %
Egyptian Premier League	21 September 2023	18 August 2024	Matchday 1	8th	34	12	10	12	51	42	+9	35.29
Egypt Cup	28 May 2024	21 August 2024	Round of 32	Round of 16	2	1	0	1	1	3	−2	50.00
League Cup	10 January 2024	7 August 2024	Group stage	Winners	6	5	1	0	12	3	+9	83.33
Egyptian Super Cup	25 December 2023	28 December 2023	Semi-finals	Fourth-place	2	0	1	1	1	2	−1	0.00
Total					44	18	12	14	65	50	+15	40.91

Source: Soccerway

=== Egyptian Premier League ===
==== League table ====
Pos	Team	Pld	W	D	L	GF	GA	GD	Pts
6	Smouha	34	15	9	10	39	35	+4	54 (Note: Head-to-head points: Modern Future 4, Smouha 1.)
7	ZED	34	13	12	9	48	35	+13	51
8	Ceramica Cleopatra	34	12	10	12	51	42	+9	46
9	ENPPI	34	11	12	11	38	37	+1	45
10	Tala'ea El Gaish	34	10	12	12	30	40	−10	42

Source: Soccerway
Rules for classification: 1) Points; 2) Head-to-head points; 3) Head-to-head goal difference; 4) Goal difference; 5) Goals scored; 6) Play-off tie.
(Note: Head-to-head records are used for final standings only)

==== Results summary ====
Overall								Home						Away					
Pld	W	D	L	GF	GA	GD	Pts	W	D	L	GF	GA	GD	W	D	L	GF	GA	GD
26	10	7	9	40	30	+10	37	6	5	3	22	13	+9	4	2	6	18	17	+1

Last updated: 23 June 2024.

==== Results by round ====
Round	1	2
Ground	A	
Result	L	
Position	12	

A = Away; H = Home; W = Win; D = Draw; L = Loss; P = Postponed

==== Matches ====
The league fixtures were unveiled on 11 September 2023.

21 September 2023 1	Al Ittihad	1–0	Ceramica Cleopatra

6 October 2023 3	Pharco	2–2	Ceramica Cleopatra

20 October 2023 4	Ceramica Cleopatra	4–0	El Dakhleya

29 October 2023 5	Tala'ea El Gaish	1–0	Ceramica Cleopatra

3 November 2023 6	Ceramica Cleopatra	2–0	Pyramids

8 November 2023 2	Ceramica Cleopatra	1–2	Al Ahly

1 December 2023 7	National Bank	0–1	Ceramica Cleopatra

5 December 2023 8	Ceramica Cleopatra	4–2	ENPPI

14 December 2023 9	Modern Future	1–1	Ceramica Cleopatra

15 February 2024 12	Ismaily	2–1	Ceramica Cleopatra

20 February 2024 13	Ceramica Cleopatra	1–1	El Gouna

23 February 2024 14	Baladiyat El Mahalla	3–5	Ceramica Cleopatra

1 March 2024 15	Ceramica Cleopatra	2–0	Al Mokawloon Al Arab

10 March 2024 16	Smouha	1–0	Ceramica Cleopatra

3 April 2024 17	Ceramica Cleopatra	1–1	ZED

14 April 2024 10	Ceramica Cleopatra	1–1	Al Masry

18 April 2024 18	Ceramica Cleopatra	1–1	Al Ittihad

29 April 2024 20	Ceramica Cleopatra	1–1	Pharco

4 May 2024 21	El Dakhleya	1–3	Ceramica Cleopatra

10 May 2024 22	Ceramica Cleopatra	2–1	Tala'ea El Gaish

15 May 2024 23	Pyramids	2–1	Ceramica Cleopatra

21 May 2024 24	Ceramica Cleopatra	1–0	National Bank

24 May 2024 25	ENPPI	3–2	Ceramica Cleopatra

14 June 2024 11	Ceramica Cleopatra	1–2	Zamalek

19 June 2024 26	Ceramica Cleopatra	0–1	Modern Future

23 June 2024 27	Al Masry	0–2	Ceramica Cleopatra

29 June 2024 28	Zamalek	4–2	Ceramica Cleopatra

3 July 2024 29	Ceramica Cleopatra	1–0	Ismaily

7 July 2024 30	El Gouna	0–0	Ceramica Cleopatra

20 July 2024 31	Ceramica Cleopatra	4–0	Baladiyat El Mahalla

29 July 2024 19	Al Ahly	4–1	Ceramica Cleopatra

1 August 2024 32	Al Mokawloon Al Arab	1–1	Ceramica Cleopatra

12 August 2024 33	Ceramica Cleopatra	0–1	Smouha

18 August 2024 34	ZED	2–2	Ceramica Cleopatra

=== Egypt Cup ===
28 May 2024 Round of 32	Ceramica Cleopatra	1–0	Makadi	Cairo
17:00	Akem 12'			Stadium: Osman Ahmed Osman Stadium; Referee: Mostafa Medhat

21 August 2024 Round of 16	Ceramica Cleopatra	0–3	ZED

=== League Cup ===
==== Group stage ====
10 January 2024 1	Ceramica Cleopatra	2–0	ENPPI	Cairo
17:00	Awujoola 1'; Ebuka 90+3'	Report		Stadium: Osman Ahmed Osman Stadium; Referee: Wael Farhan

17 January 2024 2	Ismaily	1–3	Ceramica Cleopatra	Ismailia
17:00	Annor 90+1'	Report	Rayyan 51'; Kendouci 60'; Belhadji 68' (pen.)	Stadium: Ismailia Stadium; Referee: Ibrahim Nour El Din

24 January 2024 3	Ceramica Cleopatra	1–1	El Dakhleya	Cairo
15:00	Hany 38'	Report	Omotosho 29'	Stadium: Osman Ahmed Osman Stadium; Referee: Mahmoud Bassiouny

==== Knockout stage ====
1 February 2024 Quarter-finals	Ceramica Cleopatra	2–0	Smouha	Osman Ahmed Osman Stadium, Cairo
16:30	Rayyan 9'; Reda 30' (o.g.)	Report		Referee: Mohamed El Atabani

6 February 2024 Semi-finals	Al Ittihad	0–1	Ceramica Cleopatra	Alexandria Stadium, Alexandria
19:30		Report	Kendouci 27'	Referee: Mohamed Youssef

7 August 2024 Final	Ceramica Cleopatra	3–1	Tala'ea El Gaish	30 June Stadium, Cairo
21:00 UTC+2				Referee: Radu Petrescu (Romania)

=== Egyptian Super Cup ===
25 December 2023 Semi-finals	Al Ahly	1–0	Ceramica Cleopatra	Abu Dhabi, United Arab Emirates
21:00	Arthur 90+4' (o.g.)	Report		Stadium: Mohammed bin Zayed Stadium; Referee: Mohamed Maarouf

28 December 2023 Third-place match	Ceramica Cleopatra	1–1 (4–5 p)	Pyramids	Abu Dhabi, United Arab Emirates
17:00	Kendouci 70'	Report	M. Fathi 78'	Stadium: Mohammed bin Zayed Stadium; Referee: Mahmoud El Banna
	Penalties
	Rayyan (penalty scored); Ramadan (penalty scored); Shokry (penalty scored); Bolbol (penalty scored); Tony (penalty missed)		El Said (penalty scored); Sobhi (penalty scored); Hafez (penalty scored); El Karti (penalty scored); Lakay (penalty scored)
