= 2023–24 Baladiyat El Mahalla SC season =

Baladiyat El Mahalla SC
2023–24 season
- Chairman: Mostafa Al-Shami
- Manager: Ahmed Abdel Raouf (until 24 June); Ahmed Abdel Moneim (from 24 June to 24 July); Mekki (from 24 July)
- Stadium: El Mahalla Stadium
- Egyptian Premier League: 16th (relegated)
- Egypt Cup: Round of 32
- Egyptian League Cup: Group stage

The 2023–24 Baladiyat El Mahalla SC season was the club's 93rd season in existence and the first season in the top flight of Egyptian football after 15 years. In addition to the domestic league, Baladiyat El Mahalla participated in this season's editions of the Egypt Cup, and the League Cup.

== Players ==
=== First-team squad ===
As of 17 September 2023

Note: Flags indicate national team as defined under FIFA eligibility rules; some limited exceptions apply. Players may hold more than one non-FIFA nationality.

No.	Pos.	Nation	Player
—	GK	EGY	Ahmed Hassan
—	GK	EGY	Mahmoud Maher
—	GK	EGY	Maher Ibrahim
—	GK	EGY	Sherif Reda
—	DF	EGY	Mohamed Abdel Razek
—	DF	EGY	Hossam Hassan
—	DF	EGY	Mohamed Ragab
—	DF	EGY	Ahmed Magdy
—	DF	EGY	Ahmed Al-Ash
—	DF	EGY	Mohamed Ashraf
—	DF	EGY	Mostafa Ashraf
—	DF	EGY	Al-Sayyid Awad
—	DF	EGY	Mohamed Saber
—	DF	EGY	Hisham Hafez
—	DF	TUN	Nour Zamen Zammouri
—	DF	EGY	Ahmed Moaz
—	DF	EGY	Ahmed Reda
—	MF	EGY	Abdel-Rahman Al-Lahouni
—	MF	EGY	Islam Marzouk

No.	Pos.	Nation	Player
—	MF	EGY	Viejo
—	MF	EGY	Moamen Ahmed
—	MF	EGY	Youssef Hassan
—	MF	EGY	Ibrahim Sheta
—	MF	EGY	Mohab Ashraf
—	MF	EGY	Mohamed Adel Amo
—	MF	EGY	Ay Tok
—	MF	EGY	Majed Hani
—	MF	EGY	Tariq Alaa
—	FW	EGY	Karim Ashraf
—	FW	EGY	Hossam Ashraf
—	FW	EGY	Mohamed Mubarak
—	FW	EGY	Abdel-Rahman Samana
—	FW	EGY	Ahmed El-Hanawy
—	FW	EGY	Abdel-Nasser Di Maria
—	FW	BDI	Mohamed Amissi
—	FW	EGY	Desdam
—	FW	EGY	Mohamed Awal
—	FW	EGY	Ahmed Etman

== Transfers ==
=== In ===
Pos.	Player	Transferred from	Fee	Date	Source
MF	(Egypt) Islam Marzouk	(Egypt) ZED		19 July 2023	
MF	(Egypt) Mahmoud Bastin	(Egypt) Gomhoriat Shebin		31 July 2023	
MF	(Egypt) Abdul Rahman Al-Lahouni	(Egypt) Porto Suez		2 August 2023	
FW	(Egypt) Karim Ashraf	(Egypt) Dekernes		5 August 2023	
MF	(Morocco) Mohamed Al-Zafrani	(Spain) Espanyol		6 August 2023	
DF	(Egypt) Abdullah Mahmoud	(Egypt) Ceramica Cleopatra		13 August 2023	
FW	(Egypt) Hossam Ashraf	(Egypt) Zamalek	Loan	30 August 2023	
MF	(Egypt) Maged Hany	(Egypt) Zamalek	Loan	30 August 2023	
MF	(Egypt) Tarek Alaa	(Egypt) Zamalek	Loan	3 September 2023	
MF	(Egypt) Youssef Hassan	(Egypt) Porto Suez		4 September 2023	
FW	(Egypt) Abdel Nasser Di Maria	(Egypt) Pharco		5 September 2023	

=== Out ===
Pos.	Player	Transferred to	Fee	Date	Source
DF	(Egypt) Mahmoud Basten	Released		29 August 2023	
MF	(Morocco) Mohamed Al-Zafrani	Released		16 September 2023	

== Pre-season and friendlies ==
Win Draw Loss

27 August 2023 Friendly	Baladiyat El Mahalla (Egypt)	1–1	(Egypt) Abou Qir Fertilizers SC	Cairo

28 August 2023 Friendly	Baladiyat El Mahalla (Egypt)	2–2	(Egypt) El Sekka El Hadid	Cairo

30 August 2023 Friendly	Wadi Degla (Egypt)	0–1	(Egypt) Baladiyat El Mahalla	Cairo
		Report	Ahmed Hassan
Note: The match was played in two 60-minute halves.

2 September 2023 Friendly	Future (Egypt)	3–2	(Egypt) Baladiyat El Mahalla
	Mohsen; Atef		Samana

12 September 2023 Friendly	Ismaily (Egypt)	2–2	(Egypt) Baladiyat El Mahalla	Ismailia
				Stadium: Ismailia Stadium

== Competitions ==
=== Overall record ===
Competition	First match	Last match	Starting round	Final position	Record							
Competition	First match	Last match	Starting round	Final position	Pld	W	D	L	GF	GA	GD	Win %
Egyptian Premier League	20 September 2023	17 August 2024	Matchday 1	16th	34	7	7	20	31	65	−34	20.59
Egypt Cup	31 May 2024		Round of 32	Round of 32	1	0	1	0	1	1	+0	0.00
Egyptian League Cup	8 January 2024	24 January 2024	Group stage	Group stage	3	1	0	2	0	0	+0	33.33
Total					38	8	8	22	32	66	−34	21.05

Source: Soccerway

=== Egyptian Premier League ===
==== League table ====
Pos	Team	Pld	W	D	L	GF	GA	GD	Pts	Qualification or relegation
14	Ismaily	34	7	12	15	33	43	−10	33 (Note: Tied on head-to-head points (3). Head-to-head goal difference: Ismaily +1, Pharco –1.)	
15	Pharco	34	6	15	13	32	43	−11	33	
16	Baladiyat El Mahalla (R)	34	7	7	20	31	65	−34	28	Relegation to Second Division A
17	Al Mokawloon Al Arab (R)	34	5	11	18	32	57	−25	26	Relegation to Second Division A
18	El Dakhleya (R)	34	3	11	20	17	43	−26	20	Relegation to Second Division A

Source: Soccerway
Rules for classification: 1) Points; 2) Head-to-head points; 3) Head-to-head goal difference; 4) Goal difference; 5) Goals scored; 6) Play-off tie.
(Note: Head-to-head records are used for final standings only)
(R) Relegated

==== Results summary ====
Overall								Home						Away					
Pld	W	D	L	GF	GA	GD	Pts	W	D	L	GF	GA	GD	W	D	L	GF	GA	GD
34	7	7	20	31	65	−34	28	5	3	9	20	29	−9	2	4	11	11	36	−25

==== Results by round ====
Round	1
Ground	A
Result	W
Position	2

A = Away; H = Home; W = Win; D = Draw; L = Loss; P = Postponed

==== Matches ====
The league fixtures were unveiled on 11 September 2023.

20 September 2023 1	Al Mokawloon Al Arab	0–2	Baladiyat El Mahalla

26 September 2023 2	Baladiyat El Mahalla	0–2	Smouha

5 October 2023 3	ZED	3–3	Baladiyat El Mahalla

21 October 2023 4	Baladiyat El Mahalla	2–2	Al Ittihad

4 November 2023 6	Baladiyat El Mahalla	3–2	Pharco

1 December 2023 7	El Dakhleya	0–0	Baladiyat El Mahalla

5 December 2023 8	Baladiyat El Mahalla	0–2	Tala'ea El Gaish

14 December 2023 9	Pyramids	2–2	Baladiyat El Mahalla

25 December 2023 10	Baladiyat El Mahalla	0–2	National Bank

30 December 2023 11	ENPPI	3–0	Baladiyat El Mahalla

15 February 2024 12	Baladiyat El Mahalla	1–0	Modern Future

20 February 2024 13	Al Masry	3–0	Baladiyat El Mahalla

23 February 2024 14	Baladiyat El Mahalla	3–5	Ceramica Cleopatra

27 February 2024 5	Al Ahly	5–1	Baladiyat El Mahalla

2 March 2024 15	Ismaily	0–1	Baladiyat El Mahalla

8 March 2024 16	Baladiyat El Mahalla	1–2	El Gouna

19 April 2024 18	Baladiyat El Mahalla	2–0	Al Mokawloon Al Arab

23 April 2024 19	Smouha	4–0	Baladiyat El Mahalla

27 April 2024 20	Baladiyat El Mahalla	0–3	ZED

3 May 2024 21	Al Ittihad	2–1	Baladiyat El Mahalla

11 May 2024 22	Baladiyat El Mahalla	1–2	Al Ahly

15 May 2024 23	Pharco	1–0	Baladiyat El Mahalla

21 May 2024 24	Baladiyat El Mahalla	1–0	El Dakhleya

26 May 2024 25	Tala'ea El Gaish	1–0	Baladiyat El Mahalla

19 June 2024 26	Baladiyat El Mahalla	0–2	Pyramids

24 June 2024 27	National Bank	5–0	Baladiyat El Mahalla

29 June 2024 28	Baladiyat El Mahalla	0–0	ENPPI

3 July 2024 29	Modern Sport	1–0	Baladiyat El Mahalla

7 July 2024 30	Baladiyat El Mahalla	0–1	Al Masry

15 July 2024 17	Zamalek	0–0	Baladiyat El Mahalla

20 July 2024 31	Ceramica Cleopatra	4–0	Baladiyat El Mahalla

30 July 2024 32	Baladiyat El Mahalla	4–2	Ismaily

13 August 2024 33	El Gouna	2–1	Baladiyat El Mahalla

17 August 2024 34	Baladiyat El Mahalla	2–2	Zamalek

=== Egypt Cup ===
31 May 2024 Round of 32	Baladiyat El Mahalla	1–1 (4–5 p)	El Gouna
