= 2023–24 El Dakhleya SC season =

El Dakhleya SC
2023–24 season
- Chairman: Othman Al-Desouki
- Manager: Mimi Abdel Razek (until 20 October); Hany Abdel Baqi (caretaker, 22 October–10 November); Haitham Shaaban (from 10 November to 18 January); Amr Hassan (caretaker, 18 January–14 March); Ahmed Koshary (from 14 March)
- Stadium: Police Academy Stadium
- Egyptian Premier League: 18th (relegated)
- Egypt Cup: Round of 32
- Egyptian League Cup: Group stage

The 2023–24 El Dakhleya SC season was the club's 19th season in existence and its second consecutive season in the top flight of Egyptian football. In addition to the domestic league, El Dakhleya participated in this season's editions of the Egypt Cup, and the League Cup.

The relegation of El Dakhleya to the second division was confirmed following a 1–2 defeat against Zamalek on 21 July 2024.

== Players ==
=== First-team squad ===
As of 20 September 2023

Note: Flags indicate national team as defined under FIFA eligibility rules; some limited exceptions apply. Players may hold more than one non-FIFA nationality.

No.	Pos.	Nation	Player
—	GK	EGY	Mohamed Magdi
—	GK	EGY	Mahmoud El Zanfly
—	DF	EGY	Karim Yehia
—	DF	EGY	Abdulaziz El Sayed
—	DF	EGY	Ahmed Emad
—	DF	EGY	Ehab Samir
—	DF	EGY	Mohamed Naguib
—	DF	EGY	Mahmoud Saber
—	MF	EGY	Mahmoud Abdelaziz
—	MF	EGY	Mohamed Osama

No.	Pos.	Nation	Player
—	MF	EGY	Ali El Zahdi
—	MF	EGY	Mohamed Hamdi
—	MF	UGA	Allan Kyambadde
—	MF	EGY	Ahmed Shadad
—	MF	TUN	Achraf Afli
—	MF	NGA	Funom Alfred
—	FW	EGY	Mahmoud El Sayed
—	FW	EGY	Abdelrahman Atef
—	FW	NGA	Ibrahim Ayoola
—	FW	EGY	Mohamed El Zarief

== Transfers ==
=== In ===
Pos.	Player	Transferred from	Fee	Date	Source
DF	(Egypt) Loai Fahmy	(Egypt) Al Masry	Loan	16 August 2023	
MF	(Egypt) Ahmed Shadad	(Egypt) Al Masry	Loan	16 August 2023	
DF	(Egypt) Saeed Hany	(Egypt) Smouha	Free	17 August 2023	
FW	(Egypt) Ibrahim Galal	(Egypt) ENPPI		18 August 2023	
DF	(Egypt) Ahmed Emad	(Egypt) Al Masry	Loan	19 August 2023	
MF	(Tunisia) Achraf Afli	(Tunisia) ES Sahel		28 August 2023	

=== Out ===
Pos.	Player	Transferred to	Fee	Date	Source
FW	(Egypt) Samir Fekri	(Egypt) Al Masry	€130,000	4 August 2023	

== Pre-season and friendlies ==
Win Draw Loss Fixtures

5 September 2023 Friendly	Smouha (Egypt)	0–1	(Egypt) El Dakhleya
			Osama

== Competitions ==
=== Overall record ===
Competition	First match	Last match	Starting round	Final position	Record							
Competition	First match	Last match	Starting round	Final position	Pld	W	D	L	GF	GA	GD	Win %
Egyptian Premier League	20 September 2023	18 August 2024	Matchday 1	18th	34	3	11	20	17	43	−26	8.82
Egypt Cup	28 May 2024		Round of 32	Round of 32	1	0	0	1	1	2	−1	0.00
Egyptian League Cup	8 January 2024	24 January 2024	Group stage	Group stage	3	1	1	1	3	3	+0	33.33
Total					38	4	12	22	21	48	−27	10.53

Source: Competitions

=== Egyptian Premier League ===
==== League table ====
Pos	Team	Pld	W	D	L	GF	GA	GD	Pts	Qualification or relegation
14	Ismaily	34	7	12	15	33	43	−10	33 (Note: Tied on head-to-head points (3). Head-to-head goal difference: Ismaily +1, Pharco –1.)	
15	Pharco	34	6	15	13	32	43	−11	33	
16	Baladiyat El Mahalla (R)	34	7	7	20	31	65	−34	28	Relegation to Second Division A
17	Al Mokawloon Al Arab (R)	34	5	11	18	32	57	−25	26	Relegation to Second Division A
18	El Dakhleya (R)	34	3	11	20	17	43	−26	20	Relegation to Second Division A

Source: Soccerway
Rules for classification: 1) Points; 2) Head-to-head points; 3) Head-to-head goal difference; 4) Goal difference; 5) Goals scored; 6) Play-off tie.
(Note: Head-to-head records are used for final standings only)
(R) Relegated

==== Results summary ====
Overall								Home						Away					
Pld	W	D	L	GF	GA	GD	Pts	W	D	L	GF	GA	GD	W	D	L	GF	GA	GD
34	3	11	20	17	43	−26	20	3	7	7	11	16	−5	0	4	13	6	27	−21

Source: Worldfootball

==== Results by round ====
Round	1
Ground	H
Result	W
Position	5

Source: Worldfootball
A = Away; H = Home; W = Win; D = Draw; L = Loss

==== Matches ====
The league fixtures were unveiled on 11 September 2023.

20 September 2023 1	El Dakhleya	1–0	ENPPI

26 September 2023 2	Modern Future	2–1	El Dakhleya

7 October 2023 3	El Dakhleya	1–3	Al Masry

20 October 2023 4	Ceramica Cleopatra	4–0	El Dakhleya

30 October 2023 5	El Dakhleya	0–0	Ismaily

4 November 2023 6	El Gouna	2–0	El Dakhleya

1 December 2023 7	El Dakhleya	0–0	Baladiyat El Mahalla

6 December 2023 8	Al Mokawloon Al Arab	0–0	El Dakhleya

15 December 2023 9	El Dakhleya	0–0	Smouha

27 December 2023 10	ZED	3–1	El Dakhleya

1 January 2024 11	El Dakhleya	0–1	Al Ittihad

20 February 2024 13	El Dakhleya	1–1	Pharco

29 February 2024 14	Zamalek	1–0	El Dakhleya

5 March 2024 15	Tala'ea El Gaish	0–0	El Dakhleya

10 March 2024 16	El Dakhleya	0–2	Pyramids

4 April 2024 17	National Bank	1–0	El Dakhleya

17 April 2024 18	ENPPI	0–0	El Dakhleya

22 April 2024 19	El Dakhleya	1–1	Modern Future

28 April 2024 20	Al Masry	1–0	El Dakhleya

4 May 2024 21	El Dakhleya	1–3	Ceramica Cleopatra

9 May 2024 21	Ismaily	1–0	El Dakhleya

15 May 2024 23	El Dakhleya	0–0	El Gouna

21 May 2024 24	Baladiyat El Mahalla	1–0	El Dakhleya

25 May 2024 25	El Dakhleya	3–0	Al Mokawloon Al Arab

18 June 2024 26	Smouha	3–2	El Dakhleya

21 June 2024 12	El Dakhleya	1–2	Al Ahly

24 June 2024 27	El Dakhleya	1–0	ZED

29 June 2024 28	Al Ittihad	1–1	El Dakhleya

4 July 2024 29	Al Ahly	4–1	El Dakhleya

8 July 2024 30	Pharco	2–0	El Dakhleya

21 July 2024 31	El Dakhleya	1–2	Zamalek

30 July 2024 32	El Dakhleya	0–1	Tala'ea El Gaish

14 August 2024 33	Pyramids	1–0	El Dakhleya

18 August 2024 34	El Dakhleya	0–0	National Bank

=== Egypt Cup ===
28 May 2024 Round of 32	ZED	2–1 (a.e.t.)	El Dakhleya	Al Salam City, Cairo
20:00	Ziko 90+6'; Hussein 103'		Tarek 48'	Stadium: Al Salam Stadium; Referee: Mohamed Abdel Alim

=== League Cup ===
==== Group stage ====
8 January 2024 1	El Dakhleya	1–0	Ismaily	Al Salam Stadium, Cairo
15:00	Omotosho 5'	Report		Referee: Mostafa El Shohdy

17 January 2024 2	ENPPI	2–1	El Dakhleya	Petrosport Stadium, Cairo
17:00	Fawzi 19' (pen.); Sebiha 60'	Report	Alfred 62'	Referee: Hosny Sultan

24 January 2024 3	Ceramica Cleopatra	1–1	El Dakhleya	Osman Ahmed Osman Stadium, Cairo
15:00	Hany 38'	Report	Omotosho 29'	Referee: Mahmoud Bassiouny
