= 2023–24 Al Ittihad Alexandria Club season =

Al Ittihad Alexandria Club
2023–24 season
- Chairman: Mohamed Moselhi
- Manager: Tarek El Ashry (until 24 June); Ahmed Sary (caretaker, from 25 June)
- Stadium: Alexandria Stadium
- Egyptian Premier League: 11th
- Egypt Cup: Round of 32
- Egyptian League Cup: Semi-finals
- Top goalscorer: League: Mabululu (11); All: Mabululu (11)

The 2023–24 Al Ittihad Alexandria Club season was the club's 110th season in existence and the 53rd consecutive season in the top flight of Egyptian football. In addition to the domestic league, Al Ittihad participated in this season's editions of the Egypt Cup, and the League Cup.

== Transfers ==
=== In ===
Pos.	Player	Transferred from	Fee	Date	Source
GK	(Egypt) Omar Salah	(Egypt) Smouha	Free	4 August 2023	
DF	(Egypt) Islam Abou Salima	(Egypt) Al Masry	Free	20 August 2023	
MF	(Egypt) Ahmed El Sheikh	(Czech Republic) Příbram	Free	17 August 2023	
FW	(Egypt) Ragab Omran	(Egypt) Ceramica Cleopatra	Undisclosed	18 August 2023	
MF	(Egypt) Omar El Wahsh	(Egypt) Ismaily	Free	14 September 2023	

=== Out ===
Pos.	Player	Transferred to	Fee	Date	Source
DF	(Egypt) Mahmoud Alaa	(Egypt) Al Ittihad	Loan return	20 July 2023	
MF	(Egypt) Ibrahim Hassan	National Bank of Egypt		11 September 2023	

== Pre-season and friendlies ==
Win Draw Loss

27 August 2023 Friendly	Al Ittihad (Egypt)	1–1	(Egypt) Ala'ab Damanhour	Alexandria
	Boateng	Report

31 August 2023 Friendly	Al Ittihad (Egypt)	1–0	(Egypt) National Bank	Alexandria
	Boateng			Stadium: Alexandria Stadium

6 September 2023 Friendly	Al Ittihad (Egypt)	1–2	(Egypt) ENPPI	Alexandria
		Report		Stadium: Borg El Arab Stadium

26 July 2024 Friendly	Al Ittihad (Egypt)	2–1	(Kuwait) Al-Fahaheel

== Competitions ==
=== Overall record ===
Competition	First match	Last match	Starting round	Final position	Record							
Competition	First match	Last match	Starting round	Final position	Pld	W	D	L	GF	GA	GD	Win %
Egyptian Premier League	19 September 2023	18 August 2024	Matchday 1	11th	34	9	14	11	30	42	−12	26.47
2023–24 Egypt Cup	2 June 2024		Round of 32	Round of 32	1	0	1	0	0	0	+0	0.00
Egyptian League Cup	8 January 2024	6 February 2024	Group stage	Semi-finals	5	3	0	2	3	4	−1	60.00
Total					40	12	15	13	33	46	−13	30.00

Source: Competitions

=== Egyptian Premier League ===
==== League table ====
Pos	Team	Pld	W	D	L	GF	GA	GD	Pts
9	ENPPI	34	11	12	11	38	37	+1	45
10	Tala'ea El Gaish	34	10	12	12	30	40	−10	42
11	Al Ittihad	34	9	14	11	30	42	−12	41
12	El Gouna	34	9	12	13	32	44	−12	39
13	National Bank of Egypt	34	9	9	16	46	45	+1	36

Source: Soccerway
Rules for classification: 1) Points; 2) Head-to-head points; 3) Head-to-head goal difference; 4) Goal difference; 5) Goals scored; 6) Play-off tie.
(Note: Head-to-head records are used for final standings only)

==== Results summary ====
Overall								Home						Away					
Pld	W	D	L	GF	GA	GD	Pts	W	D	L	GF	GA	GD	W	D	L	GF	GA	GD
34	9	14	11	30	42	−12	41	4	8	5	15	21	−6	5	6	6	15	21	−6

==== Results by round ====
Round	1
Ground	H
Result	W
Position	5

A = Away; H = Home; W = Win; D = Draw; L = Loss; P = Postponed

==== Matches ====
The league fixtures were unveiled on 11 September 2023.

21 September 2023 1	Al Ittihad	1–0	Ceramica Cleopatra

28 September 2023 2	Ismaily	3–1	Al Ittihad

6 October 2023 3	Al Ittihad	2–2	El Gouna

21 October 2023 4	Baladiyat El Mahalla	2–2	Al Ittihad

28 October 2023 5	Al Ittihad	3–2	Al Mokawloon Al Arab

3 November 2023 6	Smouha	0–1	Al Ittihad

30 November 2023 7	Al Ittihad	0–0	ZED

26 December 2023 10	Al Ittihad	3–1	Pharco

1 January 2024 11	El Dakhleya	0–1	Al Ittihad

14 February 2024 12	Al Ittihad	2–2	Tala'ea El Gaish

18 February 2024 13	Pyramids	1–0	Al Ittihad

25 February 2024 14	Al Ittihad	0–0	National Bank

3 March 2024 15	ENPPI	1–2	Al Ittihad

11 March 2024 16	Al Ittihad	0–0	Modern Future

4 April 2024 17	Al Masry	2–3	Al Ittihad

11 April 2024 8	Zamalek	3–0	Al Ittihad

18 April 2024 18	Ceramica Cleopatra	1–1	Al Ittihad

22 April 2024 19	Al Ittihad	1–1	Ismaily

27 April 2024 20	El Gouna	2–1	Al Ittihad

3 May 2024 21	Al Ittihad	2–1	Baladiyat El Mahalla

7 May 2024 9	Al Ahly	4–1	Al Ittihad

11 May 2024 22	Al Mokawloon Al Arab	0–1	Al Ittihad

14 May 2024 23	Al Ittihad	0–2	Smouha

20 May 2024 24	ZED	0–0	Al Ittihad

27 May 2024 25	Al Ittihad	0–2	Zamalek

18 June 2024 26	Al Ittihad	0–1	Al Ahly

24 June 2024 27	Pharco	1–0	Al Ittihad

29 June 2024 28	Al Ittihad	1–1	El Dakhleya

4 July 2024 29	Tala'ea El Gaish	0–0	Al Ittihad

8 July 2024 30	Al Ittihad	0–4	Pyramids

20 July 2024 31	National Bank	0–0	Al Ittihad

31 July 2024 32	Al Ittihad	0–0	ENPPI

12 August 2024 33	Modern Sport	1–1	Al Ittihad

18 August 2024 34	Al Ittihad	0–2	Al Masry

=== Egypt Cup ===
2 June 2024 Round of 32	Al Ittihad	0–0 (3–4 p)	Abu Qair Semad
