= 2023–24 ENPPI SC season =

ENPPI SC
2023–24 season
- Manager: Tamer Mostafa
- Stadium: Petrosport Stadium
- Egyptian Premier League: 9th
- Egypt Cup: Round of 16
- Egyptian League Cup: Quarter-finals
- Top goalscorer: Ahmed Amin Oufa (7)

The 2023–24 ENPPI SC season was the club's 39th season in existence and the 22nd consecutive season in the top flight of Egyptian football. In addition to the domestic league, ENPPI participated in this season's editions of the Egypt Cup, and the League Cup.

== Players ==
=== First-team squad ===
As of 20 September 2023

Note: Flags indicate national team as defined under FIFA eligibility rules; some limited exceptions apply. Players may hold more than one non-FIFA nationality.

No.	Pos.	Nation	Player
—	GK	(Egypt) EGY	Reda Sayed
—	GK	(Egypt) EGY	Abdulaziz El Balouty
—	GK	(Egypt) EGY	Abdelrahman Samir
—	GK	(Egypt) EGY	Ramadan Mostafa
—	DF	(Egypt) EGY	Ibrahim Yahia
—	DF	(Egypt) EGY	Ali Fawzi
—	DF	(Egypt) EGY	Hesham Adel
—	DF	(Egypt) EGY	Khaled Reda
—	DF	(Egypt) EGY	Mostafa Dowidar
—	DF	(Egypt) EGY	Ahmed Khalil Kalosha
—	DF	(Egypt) EGY	Ahmed Sabiha
—	DF	(Egypt) EGY	Abdullah Adel
—	DF	(Egypt) EGY	Omar Adly
—	DF	(Egypt) EGY	Marwan Dawoud
—	DF	(Egypt) EGY	Mohamed Hamed
—	DF	(Egypt) EGY	Seif El Khashab
—	DF	(Egypt) EGY	Mohamed Nabil
—	MF	(Serbia) SRB	Dejan Meleg

No.	Pos.	Nation	Player
—	MF	(Egypt) EGY	Ahmed Al Agouz
—	MF	(Burkina Faso) BFA	Eric Traoré
—	MF	(Egypt) EGY	Mohamed Ashraf
—	MF	(Egypt) EGY	Mohamed Abdelatti
—	MF	(Egypt) EGY	Ahmed Youssef
—	MF	(Egypt) EGY	Ahmed Hussain
—	MF	(Egypt) EGY	Mostafa Shakshak
—	MF	(Egypt) EGY	Mohamed Naser Mody
—	MF	(Egypt) EGY	Zeyad Tarek
—	FW	(Egypt) EGY	Ahmed Amin Oufa
—	FW	(Egypt) EGY	Emad Mayhob
—	FW	(Egypt) EGY	Ibrahim Galal
—	FW	(Tunisia) TUN	Rafik Kabou
—	FW	(Egypt) EGY	Karim Al Tayeb
—	FW	(Egypt) EGY	Yousief Labib
—	FW	(Egypt) EGY	Salah Zayed
—	FW	(Egypt) EGY	Mohamed Hamdy
—	FW	(Egypt) EGY	Ahmed Nader

== Transfers ==
=== In ===
Pos.	Player	Transferred from	Fee	Date	Source
DF	(Egypt) Mohamed Nabil	(Egypt) El Qanah	Free	12 August 2023	
MF	(Egypt) Zeyad Tarek	(Egypt) Al Ahly	Free	14 September 2023	

=== Out ===
Pos.	Player	Transferred to	Fee	Date	Source
DF	(Egypt) Mohamed Ismail	(Egypt) ZED		12 August 2023	
FW	(Egypt) Amr Marey	(Egypt) Al Mokawloon Al Arab	Free	15 August 2023	
MF	(Egypt) Momen Rady	(Egypt) Baladiyat El Mahalla	Loan	29 August 2023	
FW	(Uganda) Derrick Kakooza	(Ethiopia) Ethiopian Coffee		1 September 2023	
MF	(Ethiopia) Shemeles Bekele	(Ethiopia) Defence Force		10 September 2023	

== Pre-season and friendlies ==
Win Draw Loss

29 August 2023 Friendly	Ismaily (Egypt)	1–2	(Egypt) ENPPI

4 September 2023 Friendly	Smouha (Egypt)	2–3	(Egypt) ENPPI	Alexandria
	Mido; Farid	Report	Kabou; Zayed	Stadium: Alexandria Stadium

6 September 2023 Friendly	Al Ittihad (Egypt)	1–2	(Egypt) ENPPI	Alexandria
		Report		Stadium: Borg El Arab Stadium

== Competitions ==
=== Overall record ===
Competition	First match	Last match	Starting round	Final position	Record							
Competition	First match	Last match	Starting round	Final position	Pld	W	D	L	GF	GA	GD	Win %
Egyptian Premier League	20 September 2023	17 August 2024	Matchday 1	9th	34	11	12	11	38	37	+1	32.35
Egypt Cup	1 June 2024	20 August 2024	Round of 32	Round of 16	2	1	0	1	1	1	+0	50.00
Egyptian League Cup	10 January 2024	31 January 2024	Group stage	Quarter-finals	4	2	0	2	3	5	−2	50.00
Total					40	14	12	14	42	43	−1	35.00

Source: Competitions

=== Egyptian Premier League ===
==== League table ====
Pos	Team	Pld	W	D	L	GF	GA	GD	Pts
7	ZED	34	13	12	9	48	35	+13	51
8	Ceramica Cleopatra	34	12	10	12	51	42	+9	46
9	ENPPI	34	11	12	11	38	37	+1	45
10	Tala'ea El Gaish	34	10	12	12	30	40	−10	42
11	Al Ittihad	34	9	14	11	30	42	−12	41

Source: Soccerway
Rules for classification: 1) Points; 2) Head-to-head points; 3) Head-to-head goal difference; 4) Goal difference; 5) Goals scored; 6) Play-off tie.
(Note: Head-to-head records are used for final standings only)

==== Results summary ====
Overall								Home						Away					
Pld	W	D	L	GF	GA	GD	Pts	W	D	L	GF	GA	GD	W	D	L	GF	GA	GD
14	8	2	4	17	11	+6	26	4	2	1	10	4	+6	4	0	3	7	7	0

Last updated: 3 March 2024.

==== Results by round ====
Round	1
Ground	A
Result	L
Position	12

A = Away; H = Home; W = Win; D = Draw; L = Loss

==== Matches ====
The league fixtures were unveiled on 11 September 2023.

20 September 2023 1	El Dakhleya	1–0	ENPPI

27 September 2023 2	ENPPI	0–0	Tala'ea El Gaish

8 October 2023 3	Pyramids	1–0	ENPPI

21 October 2023 4	ENPPI	3–1	National Bank

27 October 2023 5	ENPPI	2–1	Zamalek

5 November 2023 6	Modern Future	0–1	ENPPI

1 December 2023 7	ENPPI	1–2	Al Masry

5 December 2023 8	Ceramica Cleopatra	4–2	ENPPI

16 December 2023 9	ENPPI	1–0	Ismaily

25 December 2023 10	El Gouna	1–2	ENPPI

30 December 2023 11	ENPPI	3–0	Baladiyat El Mahalla

14 February 2024 12	Al Mokawloon Al Arab	0–1	ENPPI

18 February 2024 13	ENPPI	0–0	Smouha

26 February 2024 14	ZED	0–1	ENPPI

3 March 2024 15	ENPPI	1–2	Al Ittihad

4 April 2024 17	ENPPI	1–1	Pharco

8 April 2024 16	Al Ahly	2–2	ENPPI

17 April 2024 18	ENPPI	0–0	El Dakhleya

24 April 2024 19	Tala'ea El Gaish	1–0	ENPPI

1 May 2024 20	ENPPI	0–1	Pyramids

5 May 2024 21	National Bank	1–5	ENPPI

16 May 2024 23	ENPPI	0–1	Modern Future

20 May 2024 24	Al Masry	0–0	ENPPI

24 May 2024 25	ENPPI	3–2	Ceramica Cleopatra

17 June 2024 26	Ismaily	2–2	ENPPI

22 June 2024 27	ENPPI	1–0	El Gouna

29 June 2024 28	Baladiyat El Mahalla	0–0	ENPPI

2 July 2024 29	ENPPI	2–2	Al Mokawloon Al Arab

6 July 2024 30	Smouha	2–0	ENPPI

21 July 2024 31	ENPPI	1–4	ZED

31 July 2024 32	Al Ittihad	0–0	ENPPI

5 August 2024 22	Zamalek	4–2	ENPPI

14 August 2024 33	ENPPI	1–1	Al Ahly

17 August 2024 34	Pharco	0–0	ENPPI

=== Egypt Cup ===
1 June 2024 Round of 32	ENPPI	1–0	Nogoom

20 August 2024 Round of 16	Modern Sport	1–0	ENPPI
