= 2023–24 Pharco FC season =

Pharco FC
2023–24 season
- Manager: Bruno Romão (until 10 October); Khaled Galal (from 10 October to 27 December); Ahmed Khattab (from 13 February)
- Stadium: Haras El Hodoud Stadium
- Egyptian Premier League: 15th
- Egypt Cup: Round of 16
- Egyptian League Cup: Group stage

The 2023–24 Pharco FC season was the club's 14th season in existence and the third consecutive season in the top flight of Egyptian football. In addition to the domestic league, Pharco participated in this season's editions of the Egypt Cup and the Egyptian League Cup. The season covered the period from September 2023 to August 2024.

== Pre-season and friendlies ==
Win Draw Loss

20 November 2023 Friendly	Pharco (Egypt)	1–1	(Egypt) National Bank	Alexandria
		Report		Stadium: Haras El Hodoud Stadium

22 November 2023 Friendly	Pharco (Egypt)	0–3	(Egypt) Al Masry	Cairo
		Report		Stadium: Cairo Military Academy Stadium

== Competitions ==
=== Overview ===
Competition	First match	Last match	Starting round	Final position	Record							
Competition	First match	Last match	Starting round	Final position	Pld	W	D	L	GF	GA	GD	Win %
Egyptian Premier League	21 September 2023	17 August 2024	Matchday 1	15th	34	6	15	13	32	43	−11	17.65
Egypt Cup	1 June 2024	22 August 2024	Round of 32	Quarter-finals	3	2	0	1	6	1	+5	66.67
Egyptian League Cup	10 January 2024	26 January 2024	Group stage	Group stage	3	0	1	2	2	5	−3	0.00
Total					40	8	16	16	40	49	−9	20.00

Source: Soccerway

=== Egyptian Premier League ===
==== League table ====
Pos	Team	Pld	W	D	L	GF	GA	GD	Pts	Qualification or relegation
13	National Bank of Egypt	34	9	9	16	46	45	+1	36	
14	Ismaily	34	7	12	15	33	43	−10	33 (Note: Tied on head-to-head points (3). Head-to-head goal difference: Ismaily +1, Pharco –1.)	
15	Pharco	34	6	15	13	32	43	−11	33	
16	Baladiyat El Mahalla (R)	34	7	7	20	31	65	−34	28	Relegation to Second Division A
17	Al Mokawloon Al Arab (R)	34	5	11	18	32	57	−25	26	Relegation to Second Division A

Source: Soccerway
Rules for classification: 1) Points; 2) Head-to-head points; 3) Head-to-head goal difference; 4) Goal difference; 5) Goals scored; 6) Play-off tie.
(Note: Head-to-head records are used for final standings only)
(R) Relegated

==== Results summary ====
Overall								Home						Away					
Pld	W	D	L	GF	GA	GD	Pts	W	D	L	GF	GA	GD	W	D	L	GF	GA	GD
34	6	15	13	32	43	−11	33	4	7	6	17	20	−3	2	8	7	15	23	−8

==== Results by round ====
Round	1
Ground	H
Result	L
Position	15

A = Away; H = Home; W = Win; D = Draw; L = Loss

==== Matches ====
The league fixtures were unveiled on 11 September 2023.

21 September 2023 1	Pharco	0–2	Modern Future

28 September 2023 2	Al Masry	1–0	Pharco

6 October 2023 3	Pharco	2–2	Ceramica Cleopatra

22 October 2023 4	Ismaily	0–1	Pharco

28 October 2023 5	Pharco	0–1	El Gouna

4 November 2023 6	Baladiyat El Mahalla	3–2	Pharco

30 November 2023 7	Pharco	1–1	Al Mokawloon Al Arab

4 December 2023 8	Smouha	2–1	Pharco

15 December 2023 9	Pharco	1–2	ZED

26 December 2023 10	Al Ittihad	3–1	Pharco

20 February 2024 13	El Dakhleya	1–1	Pharco

25 February 2024 14	Pharco	1–1	Tala'ea El Gaish

1 March 2024 16	Pharco	2–1	National Bank

6 March 2024 15	Pyramids	1–1	Pharco

4 April 2024 17	ENPPI	1–1	Pharco

18 April 2024 18	Modern Future	2–0	Pharco

23 April 2024 19	Pharco	1–2	Al Masry

29 April 2024 20	Ceramica Cleopatra	1–1	Pharco

4 May 2024 21	Pharco	0–2	Ismaily

10 May 2024 22	El Gouna	1–2	Pharco

15 May 2024 23	Pharco	1–0	Baladiyat El Mahalla

20 May 2024 24	Al Mokawloon Al Arab	1–1	Pharco

24 May 2024 25	Pharco	1–1	Smouha

14 June 2024 11	Pharco	1–2	Al Ahly

18 June 2024 26	ZED	2–2	Pharco

21 June 2024 12	Zamalek	2–0	Pharco

24 June 2024 27	Pharco	1–0	Al Ittihad

28 June 2024 28	Al Ahly	2–1	Pharco

3 July 2024 29	Pharco	1–1	Zamalek

8 July 2024 30	Pharco	2–0	El Dakhleya

20 July 2024 31	Tala'ea El Gaish	0–0	Pharco

30 July 2024 32	Pharco	2–2	Pyramids

13 August 2024 33	National Bank	0–0	Pharco

17 August 2024 34	Pharco	0–0	ENPPI

=== Egypt Cup ===
1 June 2024 Round of 32	Pharco	3–0	Al Wasta	Alexandria
17:00				Stadium: Haras El Hodoud Stadium

20 August 2024 Round of 16	Al Ahly	w/o	Pharco

22 August 2024 Quarter-finals	Pharco	0–1	Al Masry

=== Egyptian League Cup ===
10 January 2024 1	Pyramids	2–2	Pharco

16 January 2024 2	Pharco	0–2	ZED

26 January 2024 3	Pharco	0–1	Tala'ea El Gaish
