= 2024 Egyptian League Cup final =

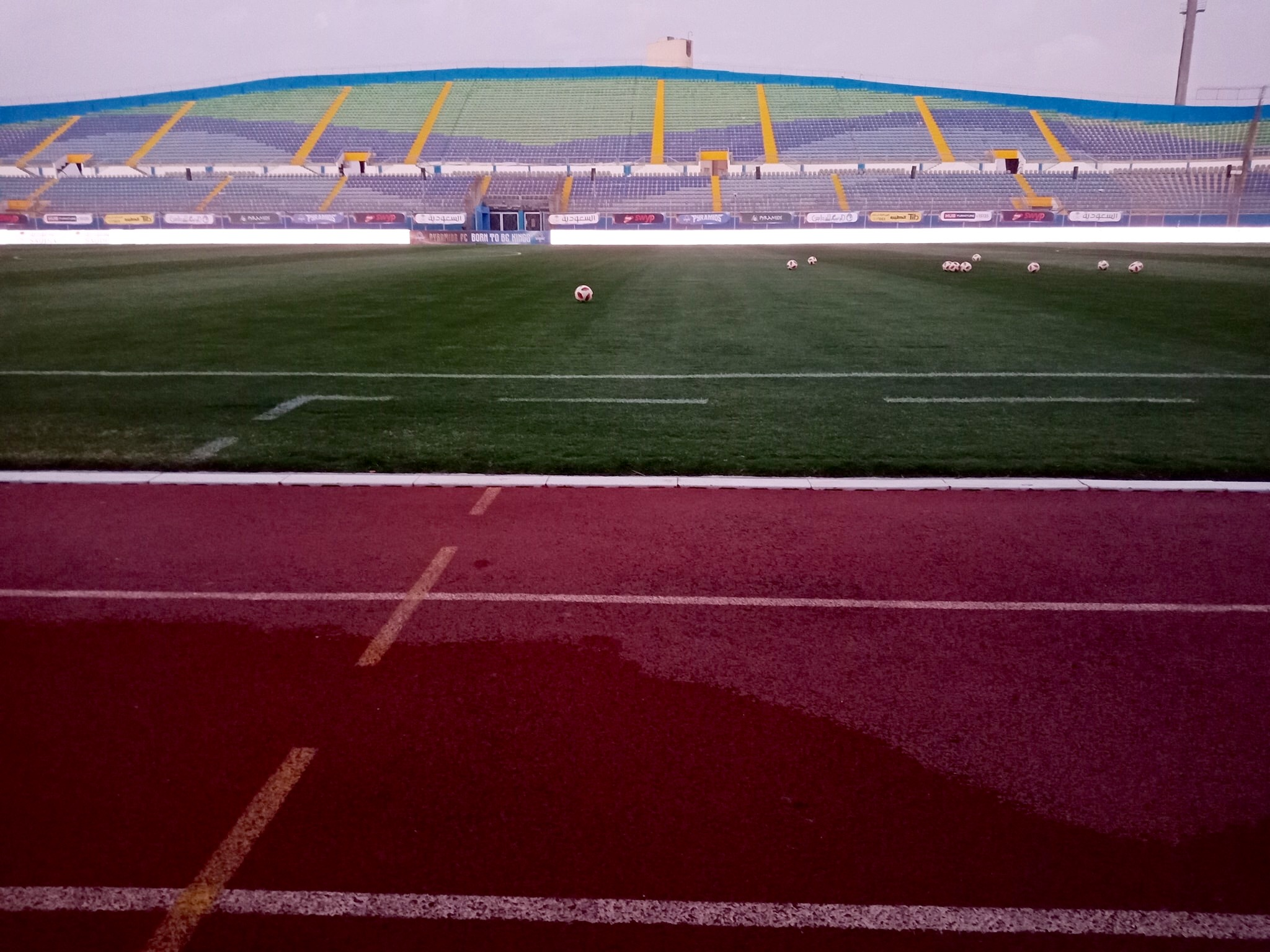
- 30 June Stadium hosted the match
Ceramica Cleopatra	Tala'ea El Gaish
3	1
- Date: 7 August 2024
- Venue: 30 June Stadium, Cairo
- Man of the Match: Sodiq Awujoola (Ceramica Cleopatra)
- Referee: Radu Petrescu (Romania)
- Attendance: 1,000
- Weather: Fair; 32 °C (90 °F); 49% humidity

The 2024 Egyptian League Cup final was the final match of the 2023–24 Egyptian League Cup, the third edition of the competition since its establishment in 2021. It was played between Ceramica Cleopatra and Tala'ea El Gaish on 7 August 2024 at 30 June Stadium in Cairo.

Ceramica Cleopatra were looking to win their second consecutive League Cup title, following their 4–1 victory in the 2023 final against Al Masry, and to become the first Egyptian club (beside Al Ahly and Zamalek) to win two consecutive domestic competitions since Haras El Hodoud in 2009. Tala'ea El Gaish on the other side played in the final for the first time, and were seeking the second major title in the club's history, with their only triump being the 2021 Egyptian Super Cup trophy.

Defending champions Ceramica Cleopatra successfully defended their title as they beat Tala'ea El Gaish 3–1 in the final, winning their second League Cup trophy and second major title in the club's history.

== Route to the final ==
=== Ceramica Cleopatra ===
Round	Opposition	Score
GS	ENPPI	2–0
GS	Ismaily	3–1
GS	El Dakhleya	1–1
QF	Smouha	2–0
SF	Al Ittihad	1–0

As the defending champions, Ceramica Cleopatra were seeded and placed in Pot 1, and were drawn in Group C with ENPPI, Ismaily and El Dakhleya. Their first group match was on 10 January 2024 against ENPPI, and ended as a 2–0 victory with goals from Sodiq Awujoola and former ENPPI forward John Okoye Ebuka. The second match was one week later, an away fixture against Ismaily, which ended 3–1 in favor of Ceramica Cleopatra, with Ahmed Yasser Rayyan, Ahmed Kendouci and Ahmed Belhadji on the scoresheet. The third match was at home on 24 January against El Dakhleya, and ended as a 1–1 draw, with Ahmed Hany scoring for the home side, which was enough to secure the top spot of the group.

In the quarter-finals, the club played against Smouha on 1 February, and grabbed a 2–0 win thanks to early goals from Rayyan and an own goal by Sherif Reda. In the semi-finals, Ceramica Cleopatra faced Al Ittihad away from home on 6 February, who were also their opponents in the semi-finals of the previous season, and managed to grab a narrow 1–0 win with Kendouci scoring the only goal of the match; sending the club to the final for the second consecutive season.

=== Tala'ea El Gaish ===
Round	Opposition	Score
GS	ZED	1–0
GS	Pyramids	2–2
GS	Pharco	1–0
QF	El Gouna	1–1 (6–5 p.)
SF	Al Masry	1–1 (3–1 p.)

Coming from Pot 3, Tala'ea El Gaish were drawn in Group B, alongside Pyramids, Pharco and ZED. The club's first group match was played on 9 January 2024 against ZED, and ended as a 1–0 victory, with Youssry Wahid scoring the only goal of the match. Their second match was played one week later against Pyramids, and ended as a 2–2 draw, with Paul Joules and Wahid scoring for Tala'ea El Gaish. The club's last group match was played on 26 January against Pharco, and ended as a win by a single goal, also scored by Wahid, that secured the top spot of the group for Tala'ea El Gaish and their place in the knockout stage.

In the quarter-finals, the club faced El Gouna at home on 31 January, and managed to advance to the semi-finals after winning 6–5 on penalties, after the original time ended 1–1, with Ahmed Abdel Rahman scoring the club's only goal. In the semi-finals, the club faced last year's runners-up Al Masry on 1 February, and despite Al Masry being the favourites to proceed to the final, Tala'ea El Gaish again won on penalties, with the result of 3–1, after the match ended 1–1, with Godwin Okwara scoring his side's only goal; resulting in Tala'ea El Gaish reaching the final for the first time in their history, and preventing a replay of the 2023 final.

== Venue ==
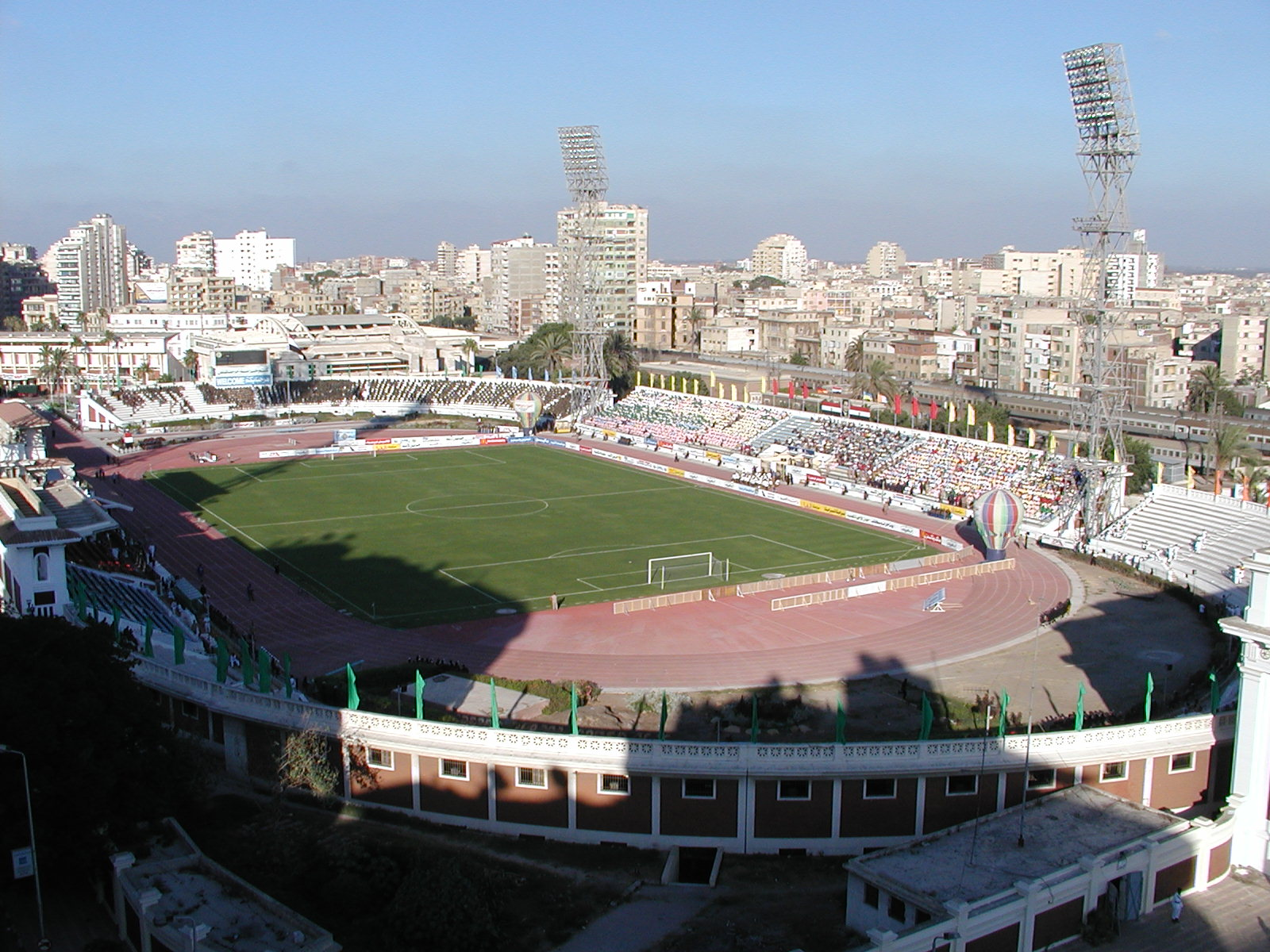
Alexandria Stadium was initially chosen as the venue for the match.

30 June Stadium was chosen on 16 July 2024 by the EPL to host the final.

The stadium is one of the recently opened stadiums in Egypt, which was opened in 2012, and has been the home venue for Egyptian Premier League side Pyramids since their formation in 2018. It was one of the venues of the 2019 Africa Cup of Nations, and previously hosted the 2018 UAE Super Cup between Al Ain and Al Wahda, and the 2021 CAF Women's Champions League final between Hasaacas Ladies and Mamelodi Sundowns.

Alexandria Stadium was originally chosen by the EPL on 25 June 2024 to host the final, scheduled to be played on 22 July 2024. However, the match was postponed and relocated to a different venue after a fire broke out in the stadium during a league game between Smouha and Pyramids on 28 June 2024, which affected the lightning system in the stadium.

The New Administrative Capital Stadium, a newly-opened stadium in the New Administrative Capital, was a candidate to host the match, but was eventually not chosen to host the match.

== Officials ==
The match officials were announced on 5 August 2024. Radu Petrescu, who previously officiated the 2019 Egypt Cup final, was selected as the main referee, with Radu Ghinguleac and Vasile Marinescu chosen as the assistant referees, and Bogdan Dumitrache as the fourth official. Andrei Chivulete and Sebastian Gheorghe were selected as the video assistant referee and the assistant video assistant referee, respectively.

== Match ==
=== Details ===
7 August 2024
21:00 CAST

Ceramica Cleopatra	3–1	Tala'ea El Gaish
Ebuka 13'; Tony 71'; Belhadji 76'	Report	K. Tarek 43'

30 June Stadium, Cairo
Attendance: 1,000
Referee: Radu Petrescu (Romania)

Ceramica Cleopatra	Tala'ea El Gaish

GK	1	(Egypt) Mohamed Bassam
RB	17	(Egypt) Ahmed Ramadan	(yellow card) 90+4'
CB	21	(Egypt) Mohamed Adel
CB	5	(Egypt) Ragab Nabil
LB	4	(Egypt) Khaled Sobhi
CM	22	(Egypt) Abdel Rahman Ramadan		(substituted off) 90+2'
CM	20	(Egypt) Mohamed Ibrahim (c)	(yellow card) 32'	(substituted off) 56'
CM	10	(Morocco) Ahmed Belhadji		(substituted off) 90+2'
RW	8	(Nigeria) Sodiq Awujoola	(yellow card) 33'	(substituted off) 81'
LW	11	(Algeria) Ahmed Kendouci
CF	18	(Nigeria) John Okoye Ebuka		(substituted off) 56'
Substitutes:
GK	23	(Egypt) Mohamed Koko
DF	6	(Egypt) Saad Samir
MF	12	(Egypt) Ibrahim Mohamed		(substituted on) 81'
MF	14	(Egypt) Mohamed Tony		(substituted on) 56'
MF	15	(Egypt) Ahmed El Armouty
FW	9	(Egypt) Ahmed Yasser Rayyan		(substituted on) 56'
FW	29	(Egypt) Marwan Osman		(substituted on) 90+2'
FW	40	(Nigeria) Samuel Amadi
FW	72	(Egypt) Nour Alaa El Din		(substituted on) 90+2'
Manager:
(Egypt) Ayman El Ramadi

GK	16	(Egypt) Mohamed Shaaban
RB	8	(Egypt) Ahmed Abdel Rahman	(yellow card) 45+1' (yellow-red card) 61'
CB	6	(Egypt) Khaled Sotohi (c)
CB	24	(Egypt) Mohamed Samir
LB	21	(Egypt) Ahmed Meteb
CM	5	(Egypt) Farid Shawky
CM	20	(Egypt) Ali Hamdy		(substituted off) 63'
AM	10	(Egypt) Abdel Rahman Osama		(substituted off) 73'
RW	26	(Egypt) Mohamed Hany		(substituted off) 63'
LW	11	(Egypt) Karim Tarek		(substituted off) 73'
CF	2	(Nigeria) Godwin Okwara	(yellow card) 48'	(substituted off) 63'
Substitutes:
GK	1	(Egypt) Omar Radwan
DF	25	(Egypt) Mohamed Diab		(substituted on) 63'
MF	3	(Tanzania) Himid Mao	(yellow card) 79'	(substituted on) 63'
MF	7	(Egypt) Ahmed El Sheikh
MF	22	(Egypt) Mostafa El Khawaga
FW	12	(Egypt) Islam Mohareb		(substituted on) 73'
FW	17	(Egypt) Omar El Said		(substituted on) 73'
FW	19	(Egypt) Youssry Wahid		(substituted on) 63'
FW	28	(Egypt) Ahmed Samir
Manager:
(Egypt) Abdel Hamid Bassiouny

Man of the Match:
Sodiq Awujoola (Ceramica Cleopatra)

Assistant referees:
Radu Ghinguleac (Romania)
Vasile Marinescu (Romania)
Fourth official:
Bogdan Dumitrache (Romania)
Video assistant referee:
Andrei Chivulete (Romania)
Assistant video assistant referee:
Sebastian Gheorghe (Romania)

Match rules

- 90 minutes
- Penalty shoot-out if scores still level
- Nine named substitutes
- Maximum of five substitutions (Note: Each team was only given three opportunities to make substitutions, excluding substitutions made at half-time.)

=== Statistics ===
First half
Statistic	Ceramica Cleopatra	Tala'ea El Gaish
Goals scored	1	1
Total shots	6	4
Shots on target	2	2
Ball possession	54%	46%
Corner kicks	1	1
Fouls committed	8	8
Offsides	0	0
Yellow cards	2	1
Red cards	0	0

Second half
Statistic	Ceramica Cleopatra	Tala'ea El Gaish
Goals scored	2	0
Total shots	7	2
Shots on target	3	1
Ball possession	60%	40%
Corner kicks	2	2
Fouls committed	5	9
Offsides	0	0
Yellow cards	1	3
Red cards	0	1

Overall
Statistic	Ceramica Cleopatra	Tala'ea El Gaish
Goals scored	3	1
Total shots	13	6
Shots on target	5	3
Ball possession	57%	43%
Corner kicks	3	4
Fouls committed	13	17
Offsides	0	0
Yellow cards	3	4
Red cards	0	1
