= 2020–21 Tala'ea El Gaish SC season =

Tala'ea El Gaish SC
2020–21 season
- Manager: Tarek El Ashry (until 2 January); Abdel Hamid Bassiouny (from 5 January)
- Stadium: Gehaz El Reyada Stadium
- Egyptian Premier League: 8th
- Egypt Cup: Pre-season

The 2020–21 season was the 24th season in the history of the Tala'ea El Gaish SC, and the club's 17th consecutive season in the Egyptian Premier League. In addition to the domestic league, the team participated in the Egypt Cup.

== Competitions ==
=== Overall record ===
Competition	First match	Last match	Starting round	Final position	Record							
Competition	First match	Last match	Starting round	Final position	Pld	W	D	L	GF	GA	GD	Win %
Egyptian Premier League	11 December 2020		Matchday 1	8th	34	10	12	12	41	37	+4	29.41
Egypt Cup					0	0	0	0	0	0	+0	—
Total					34	10	12	12	41	37	+4	29.41

Source: Competitions

=== Egyptian Premier League ===
==== League table ====
Pos	Team	Pld	W	D	L	GF	GA	GD	Pts
6	ENPPI	34	12	13	9	37	35	+2	49
7	Al Ittihad	34	12	12	10	35	35	0	48
8	Tala'ea El Gaish	34	10	12	12	41	37	+4	42
9	Al Mokawloon Al Arab	34	11	8	15	37	45	−8	41
10	Ceramica Cleopatra	34	8	15	11	41	46	−5	39

Source: Soccerway
Rules for classification: 1) Points; 2) Head-to-Head points; 3) Head-to-Head goal difference; 4) Head-to-Head goals scored; 5) Head-to-Head away goals scored; 6) Goal difference; 7) Goals scored.
(Note: Head-to-head record is used only after all the matches between the teams in question have been played).

==== Results summary ====
Overall								Home						Away					
Pld	W	D	L	GF	GA	GD	Pts	W	D	L	GF	GA	GD	W	D	L	GF	GA	GD
34	10	12	12	41	37	+4	42	4	9	4	21	17	+4	6	3	8	20	20	0

==== Results by round ====
Round	1	2	3	4	5	6	7	8	9	10	11	12
Ground	H	A	H	A	H	A	H	A	H	A	H	A
Result	D	L	L	L	L	L	W	L	W	W	D	L
Position												

A = Away; H = Home; W = Win; D = Draw; L = Loss

==== Matches ====
The match schedule was released on 23 November 2020.

11 December 2020 1	Tala'ea El Gaish	1–1	El Gouna	Cairo
	Samir 69' (pen.)		Bwalya 1'	Stadium: Gehaz El Reyada Stadium

16 December 2020 2	Aswan	2–1	Tala'ea El Gaish	Cairo
				Stadium: Petrosport Stadium

22 December 2020 3	Tala'ea El Gaish	1–2	Misr Lel Makkasa	Cairo
				Stadium: Gehaz El Reyada Stadium

25 December 2020 4	Ghazl El Mahalla	2–1	Tala'ea El Gaish	El Mahalla El Kubra
				Stadium: Ghazl El Mahalla Stadium

2 January 2021 5	Tala'ea El Gaish	1–2	Al Ittihad	Cairo
				Stadium: Gehaz El Reyada Stadium

9 January 2021 6	Zamalek	3–0	Tala'ea El Gaish	Suez
19:30 UTC+2				Stadium: Egyptian Army Stadium

15 January 2021 7	Tala'ea El Gaish	1–0	Wadi Degla	Cairo
				Stadium: Gehaz El Reyada Stadium

18 January 2021 8	Ceramica Cleopatra	2–1	Tala'ea El Gaish	Suez
				Stadium: Suez Stadium

22 January 2021 9	Tala'ea El Gaish	3–0	El Entag El Harby	Cairo
				Stadium: Gehaz El Reyada Stadium

28 January 2021 10	National Bank	0–2	Tala'ea Al Gaish	Cairo
				Stadium: Police Academy Stadium

3 February 2021 11	Tala'ea El Gaish	1–1	Al Mokawloon Al Arab	Cairo
				Stadium: Gehaz El Reyada Stadium

6 February 2021 12	Pyramids	1–0	Tala'ea El Gaish	Cairo
	Rolán 77' (pen.)			Stadium: 30 June Stadium

=== Egypt Cup ===
18 February 2021 Round of 32	Tala'ea El Gaish	3–1	El Qanah

15 April 2021 Round of 16	Al Masry	3–1	Tala'ea El Gaish
