= 2023–24 Egyptian League Cup =

كأس رابطة الأندية المحترفة 2023–24

Tournament details
- Country: Egypt
- Dates: 8 January – 7 August 2024
- Teams: 16

Final positions
- Champions: Ceramica Cleopatra (2nd title)
- Runners-up: Tala'ea El Gaish

Tournament statistics
- Matches played: 31
- Goals scored: 67 (2.16 per match)
- Top goal scorer(s): Mido Gaber; Ashraf Magdy; Youssry Wahid (3 goals each)

The 2023–24 Egyptian League Cup was the third edition of the Egyptian League Cup, a cup knockout competition open to all clubs participating in the Egyptian Premier League. The competition began on 8 January, and concluded with the final on 7 August 2024.

Defending champions Ceramica Cleopatra successfully defended their title as they beat Tala'ea El Gaish 3–1 in the final, winning their second League Cup trophy and second major title in the club's history.

Ceramica Cleopatra entered the tournament as the defending champion, having won the previous edition after beating Al Masry 4–1 in the final.

== Format ==
The format for the first edition of the competition was retained for this season. The tournament started with a group stage involving all participating teams split into four groups of four teams each, with the winners and runners-up of each group advancing to the next round. This round was played during the league's January/February break, due to the 2023 Africa Cup of Nations taking place from 13 January to 11 February 2024.

In the knockout stage round, matches are pre-determined. In the quarter-finals, teams advancing from Group A face teams from Group C, and teams from Group B face teams from Group D; and all matches are played on group winners' home venues; while the semi-finals and final are played on venues selected by the EPL. Similar to the group stage, the knockout stage, except the final, was played during the league's January/February break.

Starting from the knockout stage, matches are decided by penalties if teams are tied after 90 minutes.

The winners of the Egyptian League Cup join the Egypt Cup winners and Egyptian Premier League winners and runners-up in the Egyptian Super Cup next season.

=== Tiebreakers ===
Teams are ranked according to points (3 points for a win, 1 point for a draw, 0 points for a loss). If two or more teams are tied on points, the following tiebreaking criteria are applied, in the order given, to determine the rankings:

1. Points in head-to-head matches among the tied teams;
2. Goal difference in head-to-head matches among the tied teams;
3. Goals scored in head-to-head matches among the tied teams;
4. If more than two teams are tied, and after applying all head-to-head criteria above, a subset of teams still tied, all head-to-head criteria above are reapplied exclusively to this subset of teams;
5. Goal difference in all group matches;
6. Goals scored in all group matches;
7. Draw of lots.

== Prize money ==
On 11 September 2023, the prizes for the 2023–24 season were announced by the EPL. The winning team earn 1.5 million Egyptian pounds (LE), the runners-up receive 1 million LE, while the remaining 14 participating teams receive 100,000 LE. Any team that withdraws from the Egyptian League Cup will not receive the prizes for participation in the Egyptian Premier League, which are worth one million LE. If a team withdraws after the draw is held, an additional fine of one million LE would be applied.

Place	Teams	Amount (in LE)	
Place	Teams	Per team	Total
Winners	1	1.5m	1.5m
Runners-up	1	1m	1m
3rd–4th place (semi-finalists)	2	100k	200k
5th–8th place (quarter-finalists)	4	100k	400k
9th–16th place (group stage)	8	100k	800k
Total	16	3.9m	

== Draw ==
The draw for the group stage was held at the Egyptian Football Association headquarters in Gezira, Cairo on 31 December 2023, 14:00 CAT.

Al Ahly announced their withdrawal from the competition on 20 December 2023, citing injuries and tight schedule faced by the club in the last few weeks before the draw. On 26 December 2023, Zamalek also announced that they would not participate in the competition for this season.

Following the withdrawal of Al Ahly and Zamalek, the group stage was changed from three groups of six teams, to four groups of four teams. The 16 participating teams were separated into four pots, based on their league rankings in the previous season, except for the defending champions Ceramica Cleopatra, who topped pot 1.

Pot	Pot 1	Pot 2	Pot 3	Pot 4
Teams	Ceramica Cleopatra^{TH}; Pyramids; Modern Future; Al Masry	ENPPI; Al Mokawloon Al Arab; Al Ittihad; Pharco	Smouha; Ismaily; National Bank of Egypt; Tala'ea El Gaish	El Dakhleya; El Gouna; ZED; Baladiyat El Mahalla

== Group stage ==
All times are CAT (UTC+2).

=== Group A ===
Pos	Team	Pld	W	D	L	GF	GA	GD	Pts	Qualification
1	Al Ittihad	3	2	0	1	2	2	0	6	Advance to knockout stage
2	Smouha	3	1	1	1	2	1	+1	4 (Note: Tied on head-to-head record. Overall goal difference: Smouha +1, Modern Future 0.)	Advance to knockout stage
3	Modern Future	3	1	1	1	1	1	0	4	
4	Baladiyat El Mahalla	3	1	0	2	1	2	−1	3	

Source: Soccerway
Rules for classification: Group stage tiebreakers
Notes:
8 January 2024
15:00

Baladiyat El Mahalla	1–0	Smouha
Amissi 17'	Report

Ghazl El Mahalla Stadium, El Mahalla El Kubra
Referee: Mohamed Salama
8 January 2024
17:00

Modern Future	0–1	Al Ittihad
	Report	El Ghandour 52'

Cairo International Stadium, Cairo
Referee: Hesham El Kady

15 January 2024
17:00

Al Ittihad	1–0	Baladiyat El Mahalla
Boateng 22'	Report

Alexandria Stadium, Alexandria
Referee: Ibrahim Mohamed
16 January 2024
17:00

Smouha	0–0	Modern Future
	Report

Alexandria Stadium, Alexandria
Referee: Ahmed El Ghandour

24 January 2024
17:00

Modern Future	1–0	Baladiyat El Mahalla
El Ouadi 12'	Report

Cairo International Stadium, Cairo
Referee: El Sayed Shaaban
24 January 2024
17:00

Al Ittihad	0–2	Smouha
	Report	Dahdouh 38'; Dodo 61'

Alexandria Stadium, Alexandria
Referee: Mahmoud Desouky

=== Group B ===
Pos	Team	Pld	W	D	L	GF	GA	GD	Pts	Qualification
1	Tala'ea El Gaish	3	2	1	0	4	2	+2	7	Advance to knockout stage
2	Pyramids	3	1	2	0	7	5	+2	5	Advance to knockout stage
3	ZED	3	1	0	2	3	4	−1	3	
4	Pharco	3	0	1	2	2	5	−3	1	

Source: Soccerway
Rules for classification: Group stage tiebreakers
9 January 2024
15:00

ZED	0–1	Tala'ea El Gaish
	Report	Wahid 71'

Cairo International Stadium, Cairo
Referee: Atef Hussein
10 January 2024
17:00

Pyramids	2–2	Pharco
Tawfik 64'; Lakay 86'	Report	Gamal 33' (pen.); Teiri 52'

30 June Stadium, Cairo
Referee: Walid Abdel Razek

16 January 2024
15:00

Pharco	0–2	ZED
	Report	Hussein 42'; Ahmed 90+7'

Haras El Hodoud Stadium, Alexandria
Referee: Mohamed Abbas
16 January 2024
17:00

Tala'ea El Gaish	2–2	Pyramids
Joules 34'; Wahid 85'	Report	Tolulope 45+3'; A. Tarek 68' (o.g.)

Gehaz El Reyada Stadium, Cairo
Referee: Mahmoud Nagy

26 January 2024
19:00

Pyramids	3–1	ZED
Lakay 34' (pen.); Reda 37'; Ma. Hamdy 63'	Report	Hussein 69'

30 June Stadium, Cairo
Referee: Abdel Aziz El Sayed
26 January 2024
19:00

Pharco	0–1	Tala'ea El Gaish
	Report	Wahid 50'

Haras El Hodoud Stadium, Alexandria
Referee: Mohamed Youssef

=== Group C ===
Pos	Team	Pld	W	D	L	GF	GA	GD	Pts	Qualification
1	Ceramica Cleopatra	3	2	1	0	6	2	+4	7	Advance to knockout stage
2	ENPPI	3	2	0	1	3	3	0	6	Advance to knockout stage
3	El Dakhleya	3	1	1	1	3	3	0	4	
4	Ismaily	3	0	0	3	1	5	−4	0	

Source: Soccerway
Rules for classification: Group stage tiebreakers
8 January 2024
15:00

El Dakhleya	1–0	Ismaily
Omotosho 5'	Report

Al Salam Stadium, Cairo
Referee: Mostafa El Shohdy
10 January 2024
17:00

Ceramica Cleopatra	2–0	ENPPI
Awujoola 1'; Ebuka 90+3'	Report

Osman Ahmed Osman Stadium, Cairo
Referee: Wael Farhan

17 January 2024
17:00

ENPPI	2–1	El Dakhleya
Fawzi 19' (pen.); Sebiha 60'	Report	Alfred 62'

Petrosport Stadium, Cairo
Referee: Hosny Sultan
17 January 2024
17:00

Ismaily	1–3	Ceramica Cleopatra
Annor 90+1'	Report	Rayyan 51'; Kendouci 60'; Belhadji 68' (pen.)

Ismailia Stadium, Ismailia
Referee: Ibrahim Nour El Din

24 January 2024
15:00

Ceramica Cleopatra	1–1	El Dakhleya
Hany 38'	Report	Omotosho 29'

Osman Ahmed Osman Stadium, Cairo
Referee: Mahmoud Bassiouny
24 January 2024
15:00

ENPPI	1–0	Ismaily
Fawzi 52'	Report

Petrosport Stadium, Cairo
Referee: Ahmed Hamdy

=== Group D ===
Pos	Team	Pld	W	D	L	GF	GA	GD	Pts	Qualification
1	Al Masry	3	2	1	0	5	3	+2	7	Advance to knockout stage
2	El Gouna	3	1	1	1	5	4	+1	4 (Note: Head-to-head result: El Gouna 3–1 National Bank of Egypt.)	Advance to knockout stage
3	National Bank of Egypt	3	1	1	1	4	5	−1	4	
4	Al Mokawloon Al Arab	3	0	1	2	1	3	−2	1	

Source: Soccerway
Rules for classification: Group stage tiebreakers
Notes:
9 January 2024
17:00

Al Masry	1–0	Al Mokawloon Al Arab
Moussa 14'	Report

Borg El Arab Stadium, Alexandria
Referee: Mahmoud Nasef
10 January 2024
15:00

El Gouna	3–1	National Bank of Egypt
Moka 48' (pen.); Magdy 61', 76'	Report	Bambo 25'

Khaled Bichara Stadium, El Gouna
Referee: Ahmed Gamal

15 January 2024
15:00

Al Mokawloon Al Arab	1–1	El Gouna
Farag 62'	Report	Shousha 54' (pen.)

Osman Ahmed Osman Stadium, Cairo
Referee: Hamada El Qalawi
17 January 2024
15:00

National Bank of Egypt	2–2	Al Masry
Grendo 53'; Mansour 68' (o.g.)	Report	Gaber 38'; El Saadawy 58'

Borg El Arab Stadium, Alexandria (Note: The match took place at Borg El Arab Stadium, Alexandria, instead of Cairo International Stadium, Cairo, due to security concerns.)
Referee: Sobhy El Amrawy

26 January 2024
16:00

Al Masry	2–1	El Gouna
El Shamy 40'; Gaber 45'	Report	El Sabahi 69'

Borg El Arab Stadium, Alexandria
Referee: Mahmoud Wafa
26 January 2024
16:00

Al Mokawloon Al Arab	0–1	National Bank of Egypt
	Report	Hassan 90+6'

Osman Ahmed Osman Stadium, Cairo
Referee: Tarek Magdy

== Knockout stage ==
=== Quarter-finals ===
Matches were played on 31 January and 1 February 2024.

All times are CAT (UTC+2).

31 January 2024	Tala'ea El Gaish	1–1 (6–5 p)	El Gouna	Cairo
16:30	Abdel Rahman 27'	Report	Magdy 70'	Stadium: Gehaz El Reyada Stadium; Referee: Mohamed El Ghazi
	Penalties
	Okwara (penalty scored); Meteb (penalty scored); Samir (penalty missed); Wahid (penalty scored); Abdel Rahman (penalty scored); Diawara (penalty scored); Hany (penalty scored)		(penalty scored) Shousha; (penalty scored) Randrianantenaina; (penalty scored) Mahmoud; (penalty missed) Emad; (penalty scored) Abdel Rasoul; (penalty scored) Etouga; (penalty missed) El Deghemy

31 January 2024	Al Ittihad	2–0	ENPPI	Alexandria
19:30	El Ghandour 73'; Abdel Ghani 81'	Report		Stadium: Alexandria Stadium; Referee: El Sayed Mounir

1 February 2024	Ceramica Cleopatra	2–0	Smouha	Cairo
16:30	Rayyan 9'; Reda 30' (o.g.)	Report		Stadium: Osman Ahmed Osman Stadium; Referee: Mohamed El Atabani

1 February 2024	Al Masry	3–1	Pyramids	Alexandria
19:30	Gaber 27'; Mohsen 75'; El Eraki 85'	Report	Gad 90+2' (o.g.)	Stadium: Borg El Arab Stadium; Referee: Nader Kamar El Dawla

=== Semi-finals ===
Both matches were played on 6 February 2024.

All times are CAT (UTC+2).

6 February 2024	Tala'ea El Gaish	1–1 (3–1 p)	Al Masry	Alexandria (Note: The match was played at Borg El Arab Stadium, Alexandria, instead of Gehaz El Reyada Stadium, Cairo, due to security concerns.)
16:30	Okwara 14'	Report	Mohsen 73'	Stadium: Borg El Arab Stadium; Referee: Abdel Aziz El Sayed
	Penalties
	Wahid (penalty scored); Meteb (penalty scored); Stouhi (penalty missed); Abdel Rahman (penalty scored)		(penalty missed) El Mohamady; (penalty scored) Gaber; (penalty missed) Mohsen; (penalty missed) Guenaoui

6 February 2024	Al Ittihad	0–1	Ceramica Cleopatra	Alexandria
19:30		Report	Kendouci 27'	Stadium: Alexandria Stadium; Referee: Mohamed Youssef

=== Final ===
7 August 2024
21:00 CAST

Ceramica Cleopatra	3–1	Tala'ea El Gaish
Ebuka 13'; Tony 71'; Belhadji 76'	Report	K. Tarek 43'

30 June Stadium, Cairo
Attendance: 1,000
Referee: Radu Petrescu (Romania)

== Bracket ==
The following is the bracket which the Egyptian League Cup resembles (excluding the group stage). Numbers in parentheses next to the match score represent the results of a penalty shoot-out.

Quarter-finals; 31 January – 1 February 2024
Al Ittihad	2
ENPPI	0
Ceramica Cleopatra	2
Smouha	0
Tala'ea El Gaish	1 (6)
El Gouna	1 (5)
Al Masry	3
Pyramids	1

Semi-finals; 6 February 2024
Al Ittihad	0
Ceramica Cleopatra	1
Tala'ea El Gaish	1 (3)
Al Masry	1 (1)

Final; 7 August 2024
Ceramica Cleopatra	3
Tala'ea El Gaish	1

== Top scorers ==
Rank	Player	Club	Goals
1	(Egypt) Mido Gaber	Al Masry	3
1	(Egypt) Ashraf Magdy	El Gouna	3
1	(Egypt) Youssry Wahid	Tala'ea El Gaish	3
4	(Morocco) Ahmed Belhadji	Ceramica Cleopatra	2
4	(Egypt) Ali Fawzi	ENPPI	2
4	(Nigeria) John Okoye Ebuka	Ceramica Cleopatra	2
4	(Egypt) Khaled El Ghandour	Al Ittihad	2
4	(Egypt) Shady Hussein	ZED	2
4	(Algeria) Ahmed Kendouci	Ceramica Cleopatra	2
4	(South Africa) Fagrie Lakay	Pyramids	2
4	(Egypt) Salah Mohsen	Al Masry	2
4	(Nigeria) Tunji Omotosho	El Dakhleya	2
4	(Egypt) Ahmed Yasser Rayyan	Ceramica Cleopatra	2
