= Ekramy El Zaghat =

Egyptian development executive

- إكرامي الزغاط
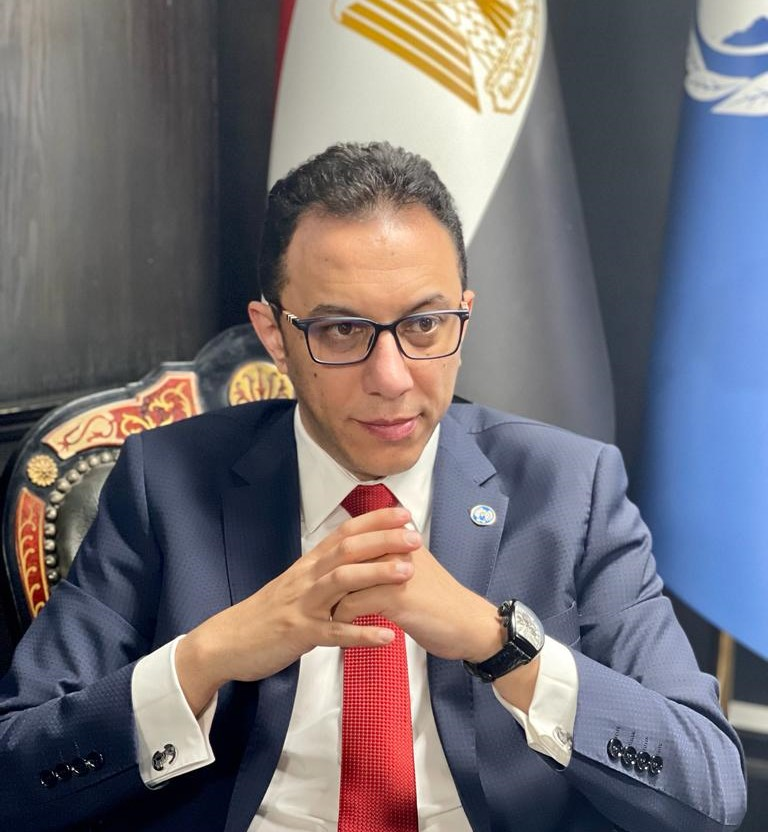
- Ekramy El Zaghat
- Occupation: Development executive
- Known for: President of the World Fund for Development and Planning

Ekramy El Zaghat is an Egyptian development executive who is the president of the World Fund for Development and Planning.

== Career ==
In 2014–2015, El Zaghat was one of the organisers behind efforts to register the Misr al-‘Urūba Democratic Party.

By 2016, his public activity shifted toward development initiatives linked to the World Fund for Development and Planning, including opening a cultural centre in Cairo under that banner and convening a preparatory roundtable for a planned continental forum on “auxiliary economies”. In December 2016, he was linked to the opening of a Ugandan cultural exchange centre in Cairo and was supervising the centre’s advisory work.

By 2017, he was serving as director-general of the Intergovernmental Collaborative Action Fund for Excellence (ICAFE), discussing that body’s partnerships and youth-oriented education programmes. In the same month, he criticised the United States decision to move its embassy to Jerusalem, a statement given in his ICAFE capacity. That year, he signed an agreement to establish a water-meter assembly project in Uganda under a development banner.

In 2019, it was announced that his organisation would suspend work with U.S. governmental and non-governmental bodies in reaction to U.S. policy positions. In 2021 Sada El-Balad reported that the World Fund for Development and Planning had been granted special consultative status with the UN ECOSOC.

In 2022, he announced projects in the Democratic Republic of the Congo and a plan to convene a “Sustainable Investment Alliance” conference in 2023, intended to mobilise investment for developing countries. In 2023, he held a meeting in Mogadishu with Somalia’s First Lady in his organisational capacity.

Previously, he served as secretary-general of the Arab Organization for Human Resources Management and chronicled community programmes and workshops run under that umbrella.
