= Ahmed Kendouci =

Algerian footballer (born 1999)

Personal information
- Date of birth: 22 June 1999 (age 27)
- Place of birth: Ghriss, Algeria
- Height: 1.80 m (5 ft 11 in)
- Position: Midfielder

Team information
- Current team: FC Lugano
- Number: 14

Youth career
- –2017: MC Saïda
- 2017–2018: MC El Eulma
- 2018–2019: ES Sétif

Senior career*
Years	Team	Apps	(Gls)
2018–2023	ES Sétif	92	(26)
2023–2025	Al Ahly	14	(0)
2023–2025	→ Ceramica Cleopatra (loan)	34	(10)
2025	Ceramica Cleopatra	6	(1)
2025–	Lugano	18	(1)

International career^{‡}
2019–2023	Algeria A'	20	(4)
2024–	Algeria	13	(0)
- * Club domestic league appearances and goals as of 28 September 2026 ‡ National team caps and goals as of 22 March 2026

Ahmed Kendouci (Arabic: أحمد قندوسي; born 22 June 1999) is an Algerian professional footballer who plays as a midfielder for Swiss Super League club FC Lugano and the Algeria national team.

== Career ==
In January 2023, Kendouci joined Al Ahly from ES Sétif. Later that year, in August, he was loaned out to Ceramica Cleopatra.

On 26 June 2025, he signed a 3-year deal with Swiss Super League side FC Lugano.

== Career statistics ==
Goal	Date	Venue	Opponent	Score	Result	Competition
1.	17 December 2022	19 May 1956 Stadium, Annaba, Algeria	Senegal	1–1	2–2	Friendly

== Honours ==
Al Ahly

- Egyptian Premier League: 2022–23
- Egypt Cup: 2021–22
- Egyptian Super Cup: 2021–22
- CAF Champions League: 2022–23

Ceramica Cleopatra

- Egyptian League Cup: 2023-24
