= El Mahalla derby =

Rivalry between Egyptian association football clubs

- Other names: Diarby Elghadab (Fury Derby)
- Location: El Mahalla El Kubra, Egypt
- Teams: Ghazl El Mahalla SC; Baladeyet El Mahalla SC
- First meeting: Ghazl El Mahalla 1–1 Baladeyet El Mahalla; Egyptian Premier League (23 November 1992)
- Latest meeting: Ghazl El Mahalla 3–0 Baladeyet El Mahalla; Egyptian Second Division (3 October 2020)

Statistics
- Total meetings: 34
- Most wins: Ghazl El Mahalla SC (17)
- All-time series: Ghazl El Mahalla: 17; Drawn: 13; Baladeyet El Mahalla: 4

The El Mahalla derby (Arabic: ديربي المحلة) is a football match between Egyptian clubs Ghazl El Mahalla SC and Baladeyet El Mahalla SC, the two biggest clubs in El Mahalla El Kubra. The derby is always filled with a lot of excitement and thrill, often dubbed the "Fury Derby" due to the intense rivalry and animosity between the supporters of these two clubs. The two clubs have faced each other in both the Egyptian Premier League and the Egyptian Second Division, where Baladeyet El Mahalla currently plays, depending on which league the two clubs played in during that season, they have also met each other twice in the Egypt Cup. Even though, the performance of both clubs has deteriorated over the course of the past few decades, the derby still retains its value and prestige. In many seasons, the derby is not played due to the two clubs playing in different leagues i.e. one club in the Egyptian Premier League and the other in the Egyptian Second Division. It is one of few crosstown derbies in football that are always played in the same stadium, in this case the Ghazl El Mahalla Stadium, as both Ghazl El Mahalla and Baladeyet El Mahalla call the Ghazl El Mahalla Stadium "home".

== The Rivalry ==
Ever since their creation, both clubs have been the top clubs in the city of El Mahalla El Kubra.
