= Tarek Alaa (footballer, born 2003) =

Egyptian footballer (born 2003)

Personal information
- Full name: Tareek Alaa Sayed Hessiun Ameen
- Date of birth: 1 January 2003 (age 23)
- Position: Midfielder

Team information
- Current team: Al-Ittihad

Youth career
- –2022: Zamalek

Senior career*
Years	Team	Apps	(Gls)
2022–2024	Zamalek	1	(0)
2023–2024	→ Baladiyat El Mahalla (loan)	1	(0)
2024–2025	→ El Entag El Harby (loan)		
2025–	Al-Ittihad		

International career
2022	Egypt U20	2	(0)
- * Club domestic league appearances and goals

Tareek Alaa Sayed Hessiun Ameen (Arabic: طَارِق عَلَاء; born 1 January 2003) is an Egyptian professional footballer who plays as a midfielder for UAE Second Division League club Al-Ittihad.
