= Nour Zamen Zammouri =

Tunisian footballer (born 1997) (inactive currently)

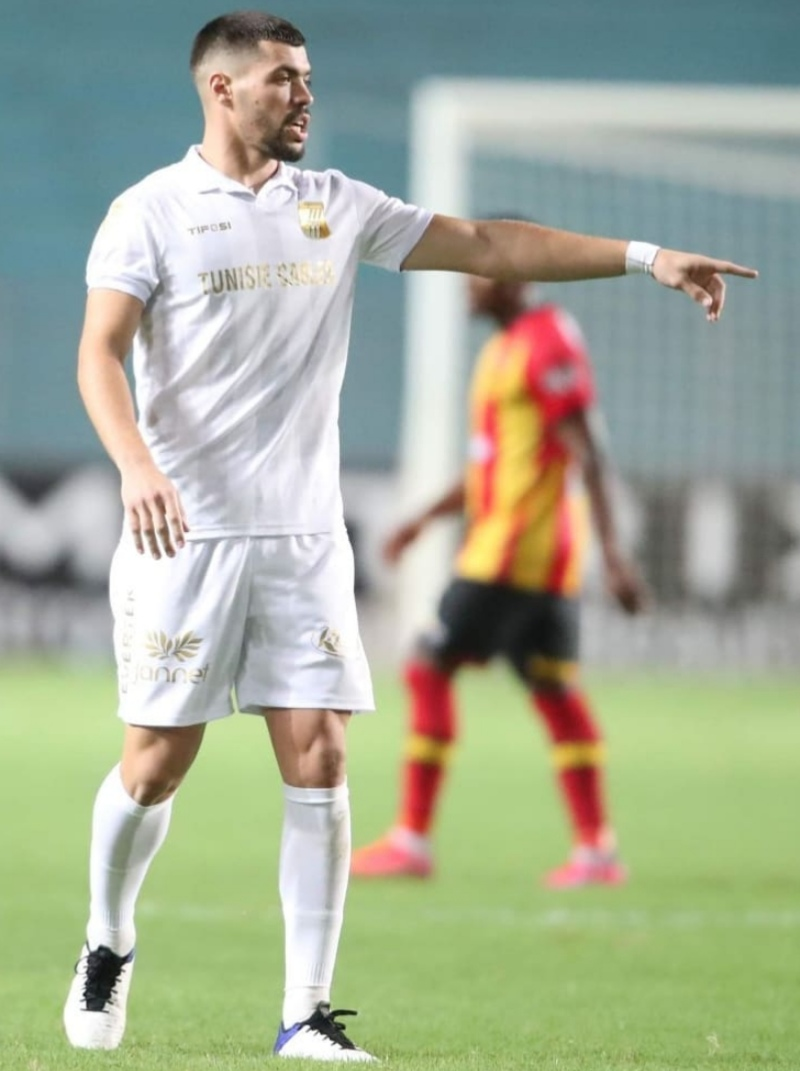
- Zammouri in 2021

Personal information
- Date of birth: 1 December 1997 (age 28)
- Place of birth: Djerba, Tunisia
- Height: 1.82 m (6 ft 0 in)
- Position: Central defender

Team information
- Current team: CS Sfaxien

Youth career
- 2008–2014: ES Jerba Midoun

Senior career*
Years	Team	Apps	(Gls)
2014–2017	ES Jerba Midoun	60	(0)
2018–2022	CS Sfaxien	70	(0)
2022–2023	Ismaily SC	0	(0)
2023	CS Sfaxien	7	(0)
2023–2025	Baladiyat El Mahalla	21	(0)
2025	Al-Sareeh	7	(0)
2025–	US Monastir	5	(0)
2026–	→ Al Ittihad Misurata (loan)	0	(0)
- * Club domestic league appearances and goals as of 14 March 2026

Nour Zamen Zammouri (born 1 December 1997; Arabic: نور الزمان الزموري) is a Tunisian professional footballer who plays as a central defender for Libyan Premier League club Al Ittihad Misurata on loan from US Monastir.

== Career ==
Zammouri began his youth career at Espoir Sportif de Jerba Midoun since 2008, in which he continued to stay in his home club post his transition to a senior in 2014.

On 21 December 2017, at the end of his contract with this club, he signed with CS Sfaxien.

On 14 September 2022, he was transferred to the Ismaily SC for a period of three years. Nevertheless, he terminated his contract with the club within six months due to unpaid salaries.

== Honours ==
CS Sfaxien

- Tunisian Cup
