= Sada El-Balad =

Egyptian news website and satellite television channel

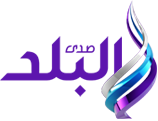
- Type: general
- Format: online, satellite television
- Owner: Mohamed M. Abou El Enein
- Editor-in-chief: Taha Gabriel
- Founded: 2011; 15 years ago
- Language: Egyptian Arabic
- Website: elbalad.news elbaladtv.net

Sada El-Balad (Arabic: صدى البلد, lit. 'Nation's Echo') is an Egyptian online news website and satellite television channel established in 2011. It is owned by businessman Mohamed M. Abou El Enein and features journalist Ahmed Sabry as its founding Editor-in-Chief.

Sada El-Balad means ''the eco of the country''.

== See also ==
- Television in Egypt
