= 2023–24 Egypt Cup =

كأس مصر 2023/24

Tournament details
- Country: Egypt
- Dates: 31 October 2023 – 30 August 2024
- Teams: 109 (all); 91 (qualifying phase); 32 (main competition, including 14 qualifiers)

Final positions
- Champions: Pyramids (1st title)
- Runners-up: ZED

Tournament statistics
- Matches played: 31
- Goals scored: 65 (2.1 per match)
- Top goal scorer(s): Marwan Hamdy (4 goals)
- (Note: All statistics do not include preliminary rounds, and include three awarded goals)

The 2023–24 Egypt Cup was the 92nd edition of the Egypt Cup, the oldest recognized football knockout competition in Egypt and Africa.

The competition started on 31 October 2023 with the first preliminary round of the qualifying phase, and concluded with the final, which was played on 30 August 2024.

Pyramids won the title after beating ZED 1–0 in the final, winning their first-ever Egypt Cup and major title.

Al Ahly were the defending champions, but were eliminated in the round of 16 after withdrawing from the competition.

== Schedule ==
The schedule for the tournament stages is as follows:

Phase	Round	Draw date	Matches
Qualifying phase	First preliminary round	2 October 2023	31 October – 3 November 2023
Qualifying phase	Second preliminary round	15 November 2023	22–25 November 2023
Qualifying phase	Third preliminary round	3 December 2023	22–24 December 2023
Main competition	Round of 32	2 May 2024	28 May – 19 July 2024 (Note: Three matches were postponed from this round, and were played between 15 and 19 July 2024. All matches were originally scheduled to be played by 2 June 2024.)
Main competition	Round of 16	2 May 2024	8–21 August 2024
Main competition	Quarter-finals	2 May 2024	21–24 August 2024
Main competition	Semi-finals	2 May 2024	27 August 2024
Main competition	Final	2 May 2024	30 August 2024

== Format ==
=== Participation ===
The Egypt Cup begin with a round of 32 teams. The 18 teams of the Egyptian Premier League, along with the 14 winning teams that qualified from the third preliminary round of the qualifying rounds.

=== Draw ===
The draw for the main competition was held on 2 May 2024, 14:00 CAST (UTC+3), at the Egyptian Football Association headquarters in Gezira, Cairo.

The 32 participating teams were separated into 3 pots. Pot 1 included the 15th placed team from the previous season of the Egyptian Premier League, alongside the 3 promoted teams from the 2022–23 Egyptian Second Division, Pot 2 included the top 14 teams from the previous season of the Egyptian Premier League, and Pot 3 included all 14 teams who qualified to the competition through the qualifying rounds.

Teams from Pot 1 were drawn against each other, while teams from Pot 2 were drawn against teams from Pot 3.

Usually, the Egypt Cup defending champions and the Egyptian Premier League winners are placed in different paths, so both teams could face each other only in the final. However, since Al Ahly won both the cup and the league last season, they were placed in the upper (league) path, while the league runners-up, Zamalek, were placed in the lower (cup) path.

Pot	Pot 1	Pot 2	Pot 3
Teams	Baladiyat El Mahalla; El Dakhleya; El Gouna; ZED	Al Ahly; Ceramica Cleopatra; ENPPI; Ismaily; Al Ittihad; Al Masry; Modern Future; Al Mokawloon Al Arab; National Bank of Egypt; Pharco; Pyramids; Smouha; Tala'ea El Gaish; Zamalek	Abou Qir Fertilizers; Al Aluminium; Asyut Petroleum; Gomhoriat Shebin; La Viena; Makadi; Al Nasr; Nogoom; Petrojet; Port Fouad; Proxy; El Qanah; Tersana; Al Wasta

=== Match rules ===
Teams meet in one game per round. Matches take place for 90 minutes, with two-halves of 45 minutes. If tied after regulation, 30 minutes of extra time are played, consisting of two periods of 15 minutes. If the score is still level after this, the match is decided by a penalty shoot-out. A coin toss decides who takes the first penalty. A total of nine players are allowed to be listed on the substitute bench, with up to five substitutions being allowed during regulation, and a further sixth is allowed in extra time.

All matches starting from the round of 32 are hosted by the teams drawn first, except for the final, which is played on a venue selected by the Egyptian Football Association.

=== Champion qualification ===
The winners of the Egypt Cup earns automatic qualification for the 2024–25 CAF Confederation Cup. In case they already qualified for the CAF Confederation Cup or CAF Champions League through their position in the Egyptian Premier League, then the spot goes to the cup runners-up. If the cup runners-up also qualified for a CAF competition through their league position, then the spot is given to the fourth-placed team in the league. Should the competition be not finished by the CAF deadline for associations to submit teams participating in next season's African competitions, the spot awarded to the cup winners would be passed also to the fourth-placed team in the league.

== Bracket ==
The following is the bracket which the Egypt Cup resembles. Numbers in parentheses next to the match score represent the results of a penalty shoot-out.

Round of 32
Al Ahly	1
Al Aluminium	0
Pharco	3
Al Wasta	0
National Bank of Egypt	4
Petrojet	1
Al Masry	1
Gomhoriat Shebin	0
Pyramids	4
Al Nasr	0
Al Ittihad	0 (3)
Abou Qir Fertilizers (p)	0 (4)
Al Mokawloon Al Arab	0
Tersana	1
Baladiyat El Mahalla	1 (4)
El Gouna (p)	1 (5)
Zamalek	5
Proxy	2
Tala'ea El Gaish	1
Port Fouad	0
Ismaily (a.e.t.)	2
El Qanah	1
Smouha	1
La Viena	0
Modern Future	3
Asyut Petroleum	0
ENPPI	1
Nogoom	0
Ceramica Cleopatra	1
Makadi	0
ZED (a.e.t.)	2
El Dakhleya	1

Round of 16
Al Ahly	0
Pharco (w/o)	3
National Bank of Egypt	1
Al Masry	3
Pyramids	1
Abou Qir Fertilizers	0
Tersana	0 (0)
El Gouna (p)	0 (2)
Zamalek	1 (3)
Tala'ea El Gaish (p)	1 (5)
Ismaily	2
Smouha	0
Modern Future	1
ENPPI	0
Ceramica Cleopatra	0
ZED (a.e.t.)	3

Quarter-finals
Pharco	0
Al Masry	1
Pyramids	4
El Gouna	0
Tala'ea El Gaish	1 (9)
Ismaily (p)	1 (10)
Modern Future	0
ZED (a.e.t.)	1

Semi-finals
Al Masry	1 (3)
Pyramids (p)	1 (4)
Ismaily	0
ZED	1

Final
Pyramids	1
ZED	0

== Round of 32 ==
Teams playing in the Egyptian Premier League entered this round, and were joined by the 14 teams advancing from the qualifying phase. This round included five teams from the Egyptian Second Division B (third tier): Al Aluminium, Al Nasr, Port Fouad, Tersana and Al Wasta; the lowest-ranked teams remaining in the competition.

All times are CAST (UTC+3).

28 May 2024	Ceramica Cleopatra (1)	1–0	Makadi (2)	Nasr City, Cairo
17:00	Akem 12'	Report		Stadium: Osman Ahmed Osman Stadium; Referee: Mostafa Medhat

28 May 2024	Smouha (1)	1–0	La Viena (2)	Shatby, Alexandria
20:00	Hassan 43'	Report		Stadium: Alexandria Stadium; Referee: Osama Ismail

28 May 2024	ZED (1)	2–1 (a.e.t.)	El Dakhleya (1)	Al Salam City, Cairo
20:00	Ziko 90+6'; Hussein 103'	Report	Tarek 48'	Stadium: Al Salam Stadium; Referee: Mohamed Abdel Alim

29 May 2024	Al Mokawloon Al Arab (1)	0–1	Tersana (3)	Nasr City, Cairo
17:00		Report	Kesho 45'	Stadium: Osman Ahmed Osman Stadium; Referee: Ahmed Hamed

29 May 2024	Tala'ea El Gaish (1)	1–0	Port Fouad (3)	Heliopolis, Cairo
20:00	Okwara 44' (pen.)	Report		Stadium: Gehaz El Reyada Stadium; Referee: Hossam Azab

30 May 2024	Al Masry (1)	1–0	Gomhoriat Shebin (2)	Borg El Arab, Alexandria
17:00	Gaber 30'	Report		Stadium: Borg El Arab Stadium; Referee: Abdel Hakim Nasser

30 May 2024	Ismaily (1)	2–1 (a.e.t.)	El Qanah (2)	Ismailia
20:00	Al-Nabris 29'; Hamdi 101'	Report	Ragab 23'	Stadium: Ismailia Stadium; Referee: Ahmed Nasser

31 May 2024	National Bank of Egypt (1)	4–1	Petrojet (2)	Nasr City, Cairo
17:00	Kaoud 29'; Madbouly 35'; Yakubu 40', 90+2'	Report	Hamdan 43'	Stadium: Osman Ahmed Osman Stadium; Referee: Mohamed Abbas

31 May 2024	Baladiyat El Mahalla (1)	1–1 (a.e.t.) (4–5 p)	El Gouna (1)	El Mahalla El Kubra
17:00	Reda 73'	Report	Shika 81'	Stadium: Ghazl El Mahalla Stadium; Referee: Haitham Osman
	Penalties
	H. Ashraf (penalty scored); Y. Hassan (penalty scored); Reda (penalty missed); Hany (penalty scored); Magdy (penalty scored)		(penalty scored) Raheel; (penalty scored) Ghanem; (penalty scored) Abdel Rasoul; (penalty scored) Mahmoud; (penalty scored) Abady

1 June 2024	Pharco (1)	3–0	Al Wasta (3)	El Max, Alexandria
17:00	Bangoura 28'; Hamada 32'; Ezz 88'	Report		Stadium: Haras El Hodoud Stadium; Referee: Amr Ramadan

1 June 2024	Modern Future (1)	3–0	Asyut Petroleum (2)	Al Salam City, Cairo
20:00	Ngwem 3', 63'; Eba 90+2'	Report		Stadium: Al Salam Stadium; Referee: Ahmed Nagy

1 June 2024	ENPPI (1)	1–0	Nogoom (2)	New Cairo, Cairo
20:00	Fawzi 43' (pen.)	Report		Stadium: Petrosport Stadium; Referee: Alaa Sabry

2 June 2024	Al Ittihad (1)	0–0 (a.e.t.) (3–4 p)	Abou Qir Fertilizers (2)	Shatby, Alexandria
20:00		Report		Stadium: Alexandria Stadium; Referee: Shahenda El Maghrabi
	Penalties
	El Wahsh (penalty missed); Boateng (penalty scored); El Ghandour (penalty scored); Aubame (penalty scored); Saleh (penalty missed)		(penalty scored) Adel; (penalty scored) Ezzat; (penalty scored) Ibrahim; (penalty scored) Hemida

15 July 2024 (Note: Round of 32 fixtures involving Al Ahly, Pyramids and Zamalek, originally scheduled to be played between 29 and 31 May 2024, were postponed after at least three players were called up from each team by the Egypt national football team for 2026 FIFA World Cup qualifiers set to be played in early June 2024. The matches were later rescheduled to be played between 15 and 19 July 2024.)	Pyramids (1)	4–0	Al Nasr (3)	New Cairo, Cairo
20:00	Osama 10'; Ma. Hamdy 22', 38', 51'	Report		Stadium: 30 June Stadium; Referee: Amr El Shenawy

18 July 2024	Zamalek (1)	5–2	Proxy (2)	Nasr City, Cairo
20:00	Yasser 3'; Obama 7'; Maher 8'; El Said 81' (pen.); Mansi 90+5'	Report	Barakat 19' (pen.); Adham 22'	Stadium: Cairo International Stadium; Referee: Mahmoud Hussein

19 July 2024	Al Ahly (1)	1–0	Al Aluminium (3)	Nasr City, Cairo
20:00	Fouad 90+3' (o.g.)	Report		Stadium: Cairo International Stadium; Referee: Abdel Rahman Saleh

== Round of 16 ==
Starting from this round onwards, all participating teams were winners of the previous round. Tersana were the lowest-ranked team remaining in the competition, who were a member of the Egyptian Second Division B (third tier).

All times are CAST (UTC+3).

8 August 2024	Pyramids (1)	1–0	Abou Qir Fertilizers (2)	New Cairo, Cairo
18:00	Ma. Hamdy 27'	Report		Stadium: 30 June Stadium; Referee: Mostafa El Shohdy

8 August 2024	Tersana (3)	0–0 (a.e.t.) (0–2 p)	El Gouna (1)	Giza
18:00		Report		Stadium: Hassan El Shazly Stadium; Referee: El Sayed Mounir
	Penalties
	Kesho (penalty missed); Nageh (penalty missed); Mosaad (penalty missed); Otu (penalty missed)		(penalty scored) Raheel; (penalty missed) Yasser; (penalty scored) Abdel Rasoul

9 August 2024	National Bank of Egypt (1)	1–3	Al Masry (1)	Borg El Arab, Alexandria
21:00	Bambo 15'	Report	Gaber 84' (pen.), 90+11' (pen.); Mohsen 86'	Stadium: Borg El Arab Stadium; Referee: Ahmed El Ghandour

20 August 2024	Al Ahly (1)	0–3; Awarded (Note: Pharco were awarded a 3–0 walkover win after Al Ahly withdrew from the match.)	Pharco (1)	Nasr City, Cairo
21:00		Report		Stadium: Cairo International Stadium

20 August 2024	Modern Future (1)	1–0	ENPPI (1)	Al Salam City, Cairo
21:00	Rizk 69'	Report		Stadium: Al Salam Stadium; Referee: Abdel Aziz El Sayed

21 August 2024	Ismaily (1)	2–0	Smouha (1)	Ismailia
18:00	Al-Nabris 22', 53'	Report		Stadium: Ismailia Stadium; Referee: Tarek Magdy

21 August 2024	Ceramica Cleopatra (1)	0–3 (a.e.t.)	ZED (1)	Nasr City, Cairo
18:00		Report	Dilson 106', 120+2'; El Banouby 120+1'	Stadium: Osman Ahmed Osman Stadium; Referee: Amin Omar

21 August 2024	Zamalek (1)	1–1 (a.e.t.) (3–5 p)	Tala'ea El Gaish (1)	Al Salam City, Cairo
21:00	Esho 79'	Report	Zaky 90+6'	Stadium: Al Salam Stadium; Referee: Mohamed Maarouf
	Penalties
	Abdel Maguid (penalty scored); Roaa (penalty scored); Shehata (penalty scored); Kamal (penalty missed)		(penalty scored) El Sheikh; (penalty scored) Zaky; (penalty scored) Meteb; (penalty scored) Mao; (penalty scored) Okwara

== Quarter-finals ==
All times are CAST (UTC+3).

21 August 2024	Pyramids (1)	4–0	El Gouna (1)	New Cairo, Cairo
21:00	Mayele 7'; Samy 42'; Touré 56'; M. Fathi 78'	Report		Stadium: 30 June Stadium; Referee: Mohamed Youssef

22 August 2024	Pharco (1)	0–1	Al Masry (1)	Borg El Arab, Alexandria
21:00		Report	El Shamy 11'	Stadium: Borg El Arab Stadium; Referee: Mohamed El Atabani

24 August 2024	Tala'ea El Gaish (1)	1–1 (a.e.t.) (9–10 p)	Ismaily (1)	Heliopolis, Cairo
18:00	Okwara 29'	Report	Ammar 90+1'	Stadium: Gehaz El Reyada Stadium; Referee: Mohamed Salama

24 August 2024	Modern Future (1)	0–1 (a.e.t.)	ZED (1)	Al Salam City, Cairo
21:00		Report	Ismail 116'	Stadium: Al Salam Stadium; Referee: Mahmoud Bassiouny

== Semi-finals ==
All times are CAST (UTC+3).

27 August 2024	Ismaily (1)	0–1	ZED (1)	Ismailia
18:00		Report	Dilson 15'	Stadium: Ismailia Stadium; Referee: Mahmoud El Banna

27 August 2024	Al Masry (1)	1–1 (a.e.t.) (3–4 p)	Pyramids (1)	Borg El Arab, Alexandria
21:00	Mohsen 83'	Report	Lakay 10'	Stadium: Borg El Arab Stadium; Referee: Mohamed Adel

== Final ==
30 August 2024
21:00 CAST

Pyramids	1–0	ZED
Mayele 87'	Report

Borg El Arab Stadium, Alexandria
Referee: Ahmed El Ghandour

== Top scorers ==
Rank	Player	Club	Goals
1	(Egypt) Marwan Hamdy	Pyramids	4
2	(Angola) Dilson	ZED	3
2	(Egypt) Mido Gaber	Al Masry	3
2	(Palestine) Khaled Al-Nabris	Ismaily	3
5	(Democratic Republic of the Congo) Fiston Mayele	Pyramids	2
5	(Egypt) Salah Mohsen	Al Masry	2
5	(Cameroon) Jonathan Ngwem	Modern Future	2
5	(Nigeria) Godwin Okwara	Tala'ea El Gaish	2
5	(Ghana) Issahaku Yakubu	National Bank of Egypt	2
