= Mohamed M. Abou El Enein =

Egyptian businessman and politician

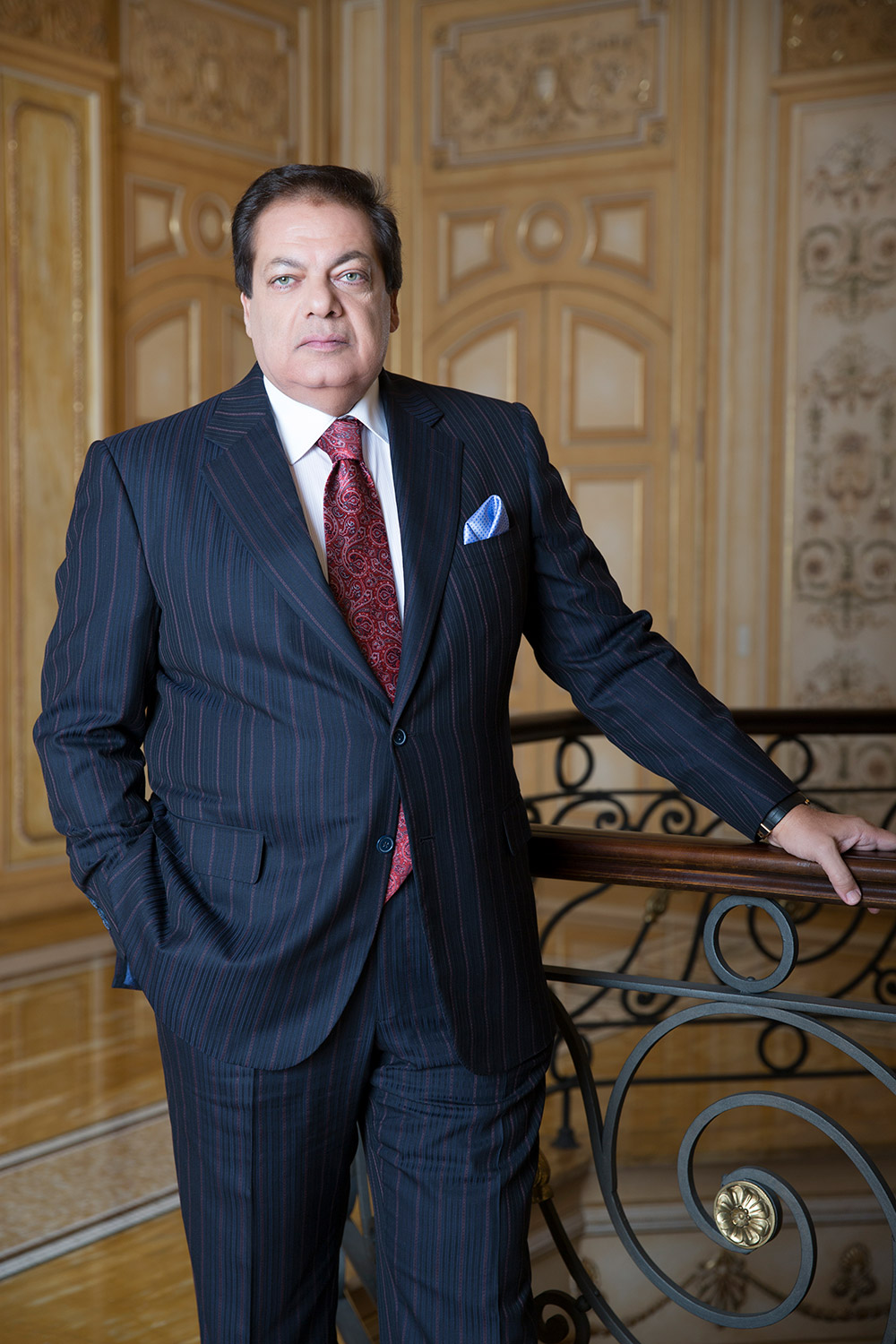

Deputy Speaker
- In office January 12, 2021 – January 12, 2026
- Succeeded by: Assem el Gazzar

Personal details
- Born: September 5, 1951 (age 74) Cairo, Egypt
- Education: Helwan University
- Occupation: Businessman and politician
- Website: abouelenein.com

Mohamed M. Abou El Enein (Arabic: محمد أبو العينين; born September 5, 1951) is an Egyptian businessman, investor, public figure and politician. He is the chairman and founder of Cleopatra Group and the chairman of Ceramica Cleopatra FC.

He has been a Member of Parliament for over 15 years, from 1995 to 2011, being chosen as the Chairman of many Committees and as a representative in many international assemblies. Currently, he is serving as Deputy Speaker of the House of Representatives. He was awarded the International Social Commitment Award in 2018.

== Branding ==
Abou El Enein founded Cleopatra Group in 1983. At the time, he started with the ceramics industry. Later on, its business ventures were to also include agriculture, technology, tourism, and aviation (Abou El Enein is also a certified pilot). Mohamed Abou El Enein began his entrepreneurial career in international trade between Europe and Egypt back in 1973. In 1983, he established his first factory in the 10th of Ramadan City, it manufactures ceramics.

He founded a number of luxury resorts and hotels in Sharm el-Sheikh, Makadi Bay, Marsa Alam, and Taba. Cleopatra acquired a German tourism company, Aldiana, with ten Club Hotels spread in 6 different countries (Tunisia, Spain, Austria, Turkey, Cyprus, and Greece). Abou El Enein has marketed the Cleopatra brand with Cleopatra Luxury Hotels & Resorts (a number of luxury resorts in Sharm el-Sheikh, Hurgada, Taba, and Mersa Matruh) and Cleopatra Media for TV Channels, among others.

Abou El Enein's real estate development has been on Cleopatra Square in 6th of October City (consisting of 117 plots) and Cleopatra Palace in Shorouk City (a compound located over 200,000 m^{2} and including two-story villas and 16 residential buildings).

== Political activity ==
Abou El Enein has been a member of the People's Assembly since 1995. In 2001, he established an organization, the Abou El Enein Organization for Social Activities & Charity.

In 2005, he was elected "Chairman of the Committee on Housing, Public Utilities and Construction" (2000–2005), then the "Chairman of the Committee on Industry and Energy" (2005–2011). Abou El Enein was elected in 2010 as the Chairman of the Parliamentary Assembly of the Mediterranean (PAM), based in Malta. The Parliamentary Assembly of the Mediterranean (PAM) selected him to be its "Roving Ambassador", as well as its "Permanent Representative to the League of Arab States".

He was also elected as the Chairman of the Committee on Economic and Financial Affairs, Social Affairs and Education of the Parliamentary Assembly of the Union for the Mediterranean (PA-UfM) for two consecutive terms.

== Personal life ==
Mohamed M. Abou El Enein had married an Italian woman for ten years before her death. Then he married again, and he has three sons and a daughter. He is a sports fan who has been playing tennis for years.
