= Ziad Farag =

Egyptian footballer (born 2002)

Personal information
- Full name: Ziad Mohamed Mohamed Farag
- Date of birth: 8 February 2002 (age 24)
- Position: Midfielder

Youth career
- Al Masry

Senior career*
| Years | Team | Apps | (Gls) |
| 2019–2026 | Al Masry | 33 | (0) |
| 2023–2024 | → Al Mokawloon (loan) | 14 | (0) |
| 2024–2025 | → Petrojet (loan) | 8 | (0) |

International career
- Egypt U17
| 2019–2020 | Egypt U20 | | |
| 2023 | Egypt U23 | 1 | (1) |
- * Club domestic league appearances and goals as of 17:15, 1st August 2026 (UTC)

Ziad Mohamed Mohamed Farag (Arabic: زياد فرج; born 8 February 2002) is an Egyptian professional footballer who plays as an attacking midfielder.

== Club career ==
Farag was first called up to the Al Masry first team squad in mid-2019 by then-manager Ehab Galal, alongside teammate Ahmed Youssef. Having been promoted to the first team in late 2019, Farag suffered an injury to his anterior cruciate ligament while on national team duty with Egypt's under-17 team.

After four seasons in the Al Masry first team without featuring regularly, Farag was loaned to fellow Egyptian Premier League club Al Mokawloon ahead of the 2023–24 season on a two-year deal. Despite this, the following season he was loaned to Petrojet.

== International career ==
Having already represented the nation at under-17 level, Farag was called up to Egypt's under-20 squad in July 2020, having already represented the side at the 2019 UNAF U-20 Tournament. He scored for the nation's under-23 side against Uzbekistan in October 2023.

== Career statistics ==
=== Club ===
As of 12 May 2025.

Appearances and goals by club, season and competition
| Club | Season | League | | | National Cup | | League Cup | | Continental | | Other | | Total | |
| Club | Season | Division | Apps | Goals | Apps | Goals | Apps | Goals | Apps | Goals | Apps | Goals | Apps | Goals |
|---|---|---|---|---|---|---|---|---|---|---|---|---|---|---|
| Al Masry | 2019–20 | Egyptian Premier League | 15 | 0 | 0 | 0 | 0 | 0 | 0 | 0 | 0 | 0 | 15 | 0 |
| Al Masry | 2020–21 | Egyptian Premier League | 5 | 0 | 2 (Note: Appearances in the Egypt Cup) | 0 | 0 | 0 | 0 | 0 | 0 | 0 | 7 | 0 |
| Al Masry | 2021–22 | Egyptian Premier League | 12 | 0 | 0 | 0 | 0 | 0 | 5 (Note: Appearances in the CAF Confederation Cup) | 0 | 0 | 0 | 17 | 0 |
| Al Masry | 2022–23 | Egyptian Premier League | 1 | 0 | 1 | 0 | 0 | 0 | 0 | 0 | 0 | 0 | 2 | 0 |
| Al Masry | 2023–24 | Egyptian Premier League | 0 | 0 | 0 | 0 | 0 | 0 | 0 | 0 | 0 | 0 | 0 | 0 |
| Al Masry | 2024–25 | Egyptian Premier League | 0 | 0 | 0 | 0 | 0 | 0 | 0 | 0 | 0 | 0 | 0 | 0 |
| Al Masry | Total | | 33 | 0 | 3 | 0 | 0 | 0 | 5 | 0 | 0 | 0 | 41 | 0 |
| Al Mokawloon (loan) | 2023–24 | Egyptian Premier League | 14 | 0 | 0 | 0 | 0 | 0 | – | | 0 | 0 | 14 | 0 |
| Petrojet (loan) | 2024–25 | Egyptian Premier League | 8 | 0 | 0 | 0 | 2 (Note: Appearances in the Egyptian League Cup) | 1 | – | | 0 | 0 | 8 | 0 |
| Career total | | | 55 | 0 | 3 | 0 | 2 | 1 | 5 | 0 | 0 | 0 | 65 | 1 |
