= Ahmed Yasser Rayyan =

Egyptian footballer (born 1998)

Ahmed Yasser Rayyan أحمد ياسر ريان
Personal information
- Full name: Ahmed Yasser Anwar Mohamed Mohamed Rayyan
- Date of birth: 24 January 1998 (age 28)
- Place of birth: Cairo, Egypt
- Height: 1.90 m (6 ft 3 in)
- Position: Striker

Team information
- Current team: National Bank of Egypt
- Number: 29

Youth career
- 2007–2017: Al Ahly

Senior career*
Years	Team	Apps	(Gls)
2017–2022	Al Ahly	6	(0)
2019–2020	→ El Gouna (loan)	41	(13)
2020–2021	→ Ceramica Cleopatra (loan)	23	(15)
2021–2022	→ Altay (loan)	26	(5)
2022–2024	Ceramica Cleopatra	57	(17)
2024–	National Bank of Egypt	27	(8)

International career
2019–2021	Egypt U23	17	(5)
2021–	Egypt	2	(0)
- * Club domestic league appearances and goals as of 8 October 2025 (UTC)

Ahmed Yasser Anwar Mohamed Mohamed Rayyan (Arabic: أَحمَد يَاسِر أَنوَر مُحَمَّد مُحَمَّد رَيَّان; born 24 January 1998) is an Egyptian professional footballer who plays as a striker for Egyptian Premier League club National Bank of Egypt SC. He is the son of former Egypt international footballer Yasser Rayyan.

== Honours ==
Al Ahly

- Egyptian Premier League: 2017–18
- CAF Champions League: 2020–21

Egypt U23

- Africa U-23 Cup of Nations: 2019
