= Mido Gaber =

Egyptian footballer (born 1992)

Mohamed Gaber
Personal information
- Full name: Mohamed Gaber Tawfik Hussein
- Date of birth: 22 September 1992 (age 34)
- Place of birth: Faiyum, Egypt
- Height: 1.84 m (6 ft 0 in)
- Position: Attacking midfielder

Youth career
- 2011–2012: Aluminium Nag Hammâdi

Senior career*
Years	Team	Apps	(Gls)
2012–2015	Aluminium Nag Hammâdi		
2015–2016	Misr Lel Makkasa	28	(5)
2016–2019	Al Ahly	28	(3)
2019–2021	Misr Lel Makkasa	35	(10)
2021–2023	Ceramica Cleopatra FC	56	(6)
2021–2022	Tala'ea El Gaish SC (loan)	24	(0)
2023–2026	Al Masry SC	58	(13)

International career^{‡}
2025	Egypt	3	(1)
- * Club domestic league appearances and goals ‡ National team caps and goals as of 9 September 2025

Mohamed Gaber Tawfik Hussein (Arabic: محمـد جابر توفيق حسين; born 9 May 1995) commonly known as Mido Gaber is an Egyptian footballer who plays as an attacking midfielder.

In January 2019, he returned to Misr Lel Makkasa and he signed a 3.5 year contract.

== International career ==
As of match played 9 September 2025

Appearances and goals by year
National team	Year	Apps	Goals
Egypt	2025	1	1
Total		1	1

Scores and results list Egypt's goal tally first, score column indicates score after each Gaber goal.

List of international goals scored by Mido Gaber
No.	Date	Venue	Opponent	Score	Result	Competition
1	9 September 2025	Ismailia Stadium, Ismailia, Egypt	Tunisia	2–0	3–0	Friendly
