= Benjamin Bernard Boateng =

Ghanaian professional footballer

Personal information
- Date of birth: 22 November 2000 (age 25)
- Place of birth: Ghana
- Position: Midfielder

Team information
- Current team: Nejmeh SC
- Number: 27

Senior career*
Years	Team	Apps	(Gls)
2017–2021	Elmina Sharks	57	(17)
2021–2025	Al-Ittihad	29	(6)
2022–2024	→ Smouha (loan)	13	(2)
2025-	Nejmeh SC	0	(0)
- * Club domestic league appearances and goals as of 20 January 2023

Benjamin Bernard Boateng (born 22 November 2000) is a Ghanaian professional footballer who used to play as an attacking midfielder for Ghana Premier League side Elmina Sharks.

He currently plays for Nejmeh SC he joined in September 2025.

== Career ==
Boateng started his career with Elmina Sharks in 2017.
