= Ali Fawzi =

Egyptian footballer (born 1992)

Personal information
- Date of birth: March 17, 1992 (age 34)
- Position: Right-back

Team information
- Current team: Enppi
- Number: 2

Senior career*
Years	Team	Apps	(Gls)
–2016	Aluminium		
2016–	Enppi	18	(0)
- * Club domestic league appearances and goals as of 10 July 2017

Ali Fawzi (born March 17, 1992) is an Egyptian professional footballer who plays as a right-back for the Egyptian club Enppi. In 2016, he signed a 3-year contract for the first-tier club Ennpi, to complete his transfer from Aluminum for £E700,000.
