= Gehaz El Reyada Stadium =

- Interactive map of Gehaz El Reyada Stadium
- Location: Cairo, Egypt
- Coordinates: 30.081161°N 31.303576°E
- Capacity: 20,000 (all seated)
- Surface: Grass

Tenant
- Tala'ea El Gaish

Gehaz El Reyada El Askari Stadium (Egyptian Arabic: ستاد جهاز الرياضة العسكري), is a multi-use stadium with an all-seated capacity of 20,000 located in Cairo Governorate, Egypt. It is the home for Tala'ea El Gaish.
