= Ahmed Belhadji =

Moroccan footballer (born 1997)

Personal information
- Full name: Ahmed Belhadji Saidi
- Date of birth: 16 November 1997 (age 28)
- Place of birth: Tàrrega, Spain

Team information
- Current team: Ceramica Cleopatra
- Number: 10

Senior career*
Years	Team	Apps	(Gls)
2016–2017	UE Cornellà	24	(5)
2017–2018	Real Zaragoza Deportivo Aragón	1	(4)
2018–2019	Real Balompédica Linense	32	(1)
2019–2020	Real Zaragoza Deportivo Aragón	25	(4)
2020–2021	Orihuela	18	(0)
2021–2022	Inter Club d'Escaldes	32	(7)
2022–2023	Aswan	16	(3)
2023	→ Zamalek (loan)	11	(1)
2023–	Ceramica Cleopatra	56	(13)
2023	→ El Gouna (loan)	9	(7)
- * Club domestic league appearances and goals as of 04 August 2025 @ 13:07(AEST)

Ahmed Belhadji (Arabic: أحمد بلحاج; born 16 November 1997) is a Moroccan professional footballer who plays as a midfielder for Ceramica Cleopatra in the Egyptian Premier League.
