= Baladiyat El Mahalla SC =

Association football club in El Mahalla El Kubra, Egypt

- Full name: Baladiyat El Mahalla Sporting Club نادي بلدية المحلة الرياضي
- Short name: BMH
- Founded: 30 April 1931; 94 years ago
- Ground: Ghazl El Mahalla Stadium
- Capacity: 14,564
- Chairman: Mostafa El Samouly
- League: Egyptian Premier League
- 2022–23: Second Division, 1st (Group C)

Baladiyat El Mahalla Sporting Club (Arabic: نادي بلدية المحلة الرياضي), is an Egyptian football club based in El Mahalla, Egypt. The club currently plays in the Egyptian Premier League, the top league in the Egyptian football league system.

The club is one half of the El Mahalla Derby.

== Players ==
=== First-team squad ===
As of 17 September 2023

Note: Flags indicate national team as defined under FIFA eligibility rules; some limited exceptions apply. Players may hold more than one non-FIFA nationality.

No.	Pos.	Nation	Player
—	GK	EGY	Ahmed Hassan
—	GK	EGY	Mahmoud Maher
—	GK	EGY	Maher Ibrahim
—	GK	EGY	Sherif Reda
—	DF	EGY	Mohamed Abdel Razek
—	DF	EGY	Hossam Hassan
—	DF	EGY	Mohamed Ragab
—	DF	EGY	Ahmed Magdy
—	DF	EGY	Ahmed Al-Ash
—	DF	EGY	Mohamed Ashraf
—	DF	MAR	Mohamed nahiri
—	DF	EGY	Al-Sayyid Awad
—	DF	EGY	Mohamed Saber
—	DF	EGY	Hisham Hafez
—	DF	TUN	Nour Zamen Zammouri
—	DF	EGY	Ahmed Moaz
—	DF	EGY	Ahmed Reda
—	MF	EGY	Abdel-Rahman Al-Lahouni

No.	Pos.	Nation	Player
—	MF	EGY	Islam Marzouk
—	MF	EGY	Viejo
—	MF	EGY	Moamen Ahmed
—	MF	EGY	Youssef Hassan
—	MF	EGY	Ibrahim Sheta
—	MF	EGY	Mohab Ashraf
—	MF	EGY	Mohamed Adel Amo
—	MF	ANG	Enoque Tula
—	MF	EGY	Majed Hani
—	MF	EGY	Tariq Alaa
—	FW	NGA	Mubarak Ahmed
—	FW	EGY	Hossam Ashraf
—	FW	EGY	Mohamed Mubarak
—	FW	EGY	Abdel-Rahman Samana
—	FW	EGY	maged hany
—	FW	EGY	Abdel-Nasser Di Maria
—	FW	BDI	Mohamed Amissi
—	FW	NGA	Moussa ephriem
—	FW	NGA	Emmanuel ihezou
—	FW	EGY	Ahmed Etman

== Performance in CAF competitions ==
- FR = First round
- SR = Second round
- QF = Quarter-final

Season	Competition	Round	Country	Club	Home	Away	Aggregate
2003	African Cup Winners' Cup	FR	Uganda	Police	4–1	0–0	4–1
2003	African Cup Winners' Cup	SR	Sudan	Al Hilal	4–2	0–0	4–2
2003	African Cup Winners' Cup	QF	Nigeria	Julius Berger	1–1	1–3	2–4
