= Egyptian League Cup =

- Organiser(s): Egyptian Professional Clubs Association
- Founded: 2021; 5 years ago
- Region: Egypt
- Teams: Variable
- Current champions: Al Masry (1st title)
- Most championships: Ceramica Cleopatra (3 titles)
- Broadcaster: ON SPORT
- 2025–26 Egyptian League Cup

The Egyptian League Cup, currently known as the WE League Cup for sponsorship reasons, is an annual knockout football competition in men's domestic football in Egypt. Organized by the Egyptian Professional Football Clubs Association, the competition is open to all clubs participating in the Egyptian Premier League, the highest level of the Egyptian football league system.

The tournament was officially announced on 26 September 2021, a few days after the Egyptian Professional Football Clubs Association was founded, with the aim of increasing the revenues of Egyptian clubs and increasing the competitiveness between them. The first edition of the tournament took place in 2022, consisting of a group stage and knockout phase, with the group stage being played during the 2021 Africa Cup of Nations, which was played in Cameroon in January and February 2022, while the knockout stage was played in July. Starting from the 2022–23 edition of the competition, the format was changed to a standard knockout format played throughout the season.

Ceramica Cleopatra are the current holders, who defeated National Bank 2-0 in the 2025 final to win their third League Cup title.

Trophy for the Egyptian League Cup are made by London-based silversmiths Thomas Lyte.

== Finals ==
Year	Winner	Score	Runner-up	Venue	Attendance
2022; Details	Future	5–1	Ghazl El Mahalla	Cairo International Stadium, Cairo	10,000
2022–23; Details	Ceramica Cleopatra	4–1	Al Masry	Borg El Arab Stadium, Alexandria	15,000
2023–24; Details	Ceramica Cleopatra	3–1	Tala'ea El Gaish	30 June Stadium, Cairo	1,000
2024–25; Details	Ceramica Cleopatra	2–0	National Bank	Al-Salam Stadium, Cairo	
2025–26; Details	Al Masry	3–0	ENPPI	New Suez Stadium, Suez	

== Results by club ==
Team	Winners	Runners-up	Years won	Years runners-up
Ceramica Cleopatra	3	0	2022–23, 2023–24, 2024–25	—
Al Masry	1	1	2025–26	2022–23
Modern Sport (Note: The club won the competition in 2022 under the name of Future FC.)	1	0	2022	—
ENPPI	0	1	—	2025–26
Ghazl El Mahalla	0	1	—	2022
Tala'ea El Gaish	0	1	—	2023–24
National Bank	0	1	—	2024–25

== See also ==
- EFA League Cup
- Egypt Cup
