= Ceramica Cleopatra FC =

Association football club in Giza, Egypt

Ceramica Cleopatra
- Full name: Ceramica Cleopatra Football Club
- Nicknames: Gold & Blood
- Founded: 2007; 19 years ago
- Ground: Suez Canal Authority Stadium
- Capacity: 22,000
- Owner: Cleopatra Group
- Chairman: Mohamed M. Abou El Enein
- League: Egyptian Premier League
- 2025–26: Egyptian Premier League, 4th of 18
Home colours	Away colours

Ceramica Cleopatra Football Club (Arabic: نادي سيراميكا كليوباترا لكرة القدم), is an Egyptian football club based in Giza, Egypt. The club is owned by Cleopatra Group, founded by Mohamed M. Abou El Enein.

Ceramica Cleopatra FC currently play in the Egyptian Premier League, the highest league in the Egyptian football league system.

== History ==
The club was playing in the Egyptian companies league before gaining promotion from the Egyptian Third Division to the 2016–17 Egyptian Second Division, after finishing first in their group the 2015–16 season.

In the 2019–20 Egyptian Second Division, they finished 1st in Group B, to be promoted to the 2020–21 Egyptian Premier League for the first time in their history.

== Current squad ==
As of 16 September, 2026

No.	Pos.	Nation	Player
1	GK	EGY	Mohamed Koko
2	DF	EGY	Ahmed Hany
3	DF	EGY	Omar Kamal (on loan from Al Ahly)
4	MF	EGY	Karim Nedved
5	DF	EGY	Ragab Nabil
6	DF	EGY	Saad Samir
7	FW	EGY	Islam Issa
8	MF	EGY	Abdallah Magdy
9	FW	SLO	Nejc Gradišar
10	MF	MAR	Ahmed Belhadji
11	FW	IRQ	Peter Gwargis
13	GK	EGY	Mohamed Tarek
14	MF	EGY	Hema Mohamed
15	FW	EGY	Samir El Eraki
16	GK	EGY	Islam Reisha
17	MF	EGY	Amr El Solia
18	GK	EGY	Mohamed Bassam (captain)

No.	Pos.	Nation	Player
19	FW	EGY	Ayman Mukka
20	MF	EGY	Mohamed Sadek
21	DF	EGY	Ahmed Moaz
22	FW	PLE	Khaled Al-Nabris
24	MF	GHA	Justice Arthur
25	FW	EGY	Mohamed "Shika" Ibrahim
27	DF	EGY	Hussein El Sayed
28	MF	EGY	Amr Kalawa
33	DF	EGY	Karim El Debes (on loan from Al Ahly)
34	DF	EGY	Ahmed Abdin (on loan from Al Ahly)
35	FW	EGY	Ashour Shika
37	MF	EGY	Mohamed Abdallah (on loan from Al Ahly)
41	FW	GHA	Umar Abdulrauf
66	DF	EGY	Mohamed El Maghrabi
77	FW	EGY	Bobo
97	FW	EGY	Ahmed Samir

== Honours ==
- Egyptian League Cup
  - Winners (3): 2022–23, 2023–24, 2024–25
