= 2022–23 Ismaily SC season =

Ismaily SC
2022–23 season
- Chairman: Yahya El-Koumi (until 8 January); Abu Bakr Al-Hadidi (from 29 January)
- Manager: Juan Carlos Garrido (until 9 December); Ayman El-Gamal (caretaker, from 9 to 27 December); Mido (from 27 December until 22 February); Hamza El-Gamal (from 23 February)
- Stadium: Ismailia Stadium
- Egyptian Premier League: 11th
- Egypt Cup: Round of 32
- EFA Cup: Quarter-finals
- Top goalscorer: League: Mohamed El Shamy (8); All: Mohamed El Shamy (8)

The 2022–23 Ismaily SC season was the club's 102nd season in existence and the 52nd consecutive season in the top flight of Egyptian football. In addition to the domestic league, Ismaily participated in this season's editions of the Egypt Cup and the EFA Cup.

== Overview ==
Ismaily announced the appointment of Mido as new manager after only accumulating 6 points from 9 games.

== Players ==
=== First-team squad ===
No.	Pos.	Nation	Player
1	GK	EGY	Mohamed Fawzy
2	DF	EGY	Baher El Mohamady (Vice-Captain)
3	MF	EGY	Mohamed Desouki
4	MF	EGY	Emad Hamdy
5	DF	TUN	Marouane Sahraoui
6	MF	EGY	Mahmoud Abdel Aati
7	FW	GHA	Yaw Annor
8	MF	EGY	Omar El Wahsh
10	FW	EGY	Shokry Naguib (Captain)
11	FW	EGY	Mohamed El Shamy
12	MF	EGY	Medhat Faosaa
13	GK	EGY	Ahmed Adel (3rd Captain)
14	MF	EGY	Mohamed Sadek
18	DF	EGY	Abdallah Gomaa Awad
19	FW	EGY	Abdel Rahman Magdy
20	MF	EGY	Saleh Gomaa
21	MF	EGY	Ahmed Madbouly

No.	Pos.	Nation	Player
22	DF	EGY	Essam Sobhy
24	DF	EGY	Ahmed Ayman
25	MF	EGY	Mohamed Makhlouf
27	MF	EGY	Mostafa Fares
29	DF	EGY	Mohamed Hashem
33	MF	EGY	Mohamed Bayoumi
34	DF	EGY	Mahmoud El Badry
39	MF	EGY	Omar El Saaiy
40	DF	EGY	Ahmed Eid
44	DF	EGY	Mohamed Ammar
45	DF	EGY	Mohamed Naser
—	GK	EGY	Omar Radwan
—	FW	BOL	Carmelo Algarañaz
—	FW	GAM	Saikou Conteh
—	DF	EGY	Ahmed Mohsen
—	FW	EGY	Bassem Morsy
—	FW	PLE	Khaled Al-Nabris

== Transfers ==
=== In ===
No.	Pos	Player	Transferred from	Fee	Date	Source
30	MF	(Ghana) Yaw Annor	(Ghana) Ashanti Gold	€196,000	7 July 2022	
	DF	(Tunisia) Nour Zamen Zammouri	(Tunisia) CS Sfaxien	Free	13 September 2022	
28	FW	(Tunisia) Firas Chaouat	(Tunisia) CS Sfaxien	Free	14 September 2022	
9	FW	(Egypt) Basem Morsy	(Egypt) Ceramica Cleopatra	Free	14 September 2022	
14	MF	(Egypt) Saleh Gomaa	(Egypt) Ceramica Cleopatra	Free	15 September 2022	
12	DF	(Egypt) Ahmed Mohsen	(Egypt) Ceramica Cleopatra		19 September 2022	
	MF	(Egypt) Karim El Deeb	(Egypt) Al Ittihad	Loan	31 January 2023	

=== Out ===
No.	Pos	Player	Transferred to	Fee	Date	Source
	MF	(The Gambia) Saikou Conteh	(Egypt) El Qanah	€70,000	14 July 2022	
	MF	(Egypt) Mahmoud Abdel Aati	(Egypt) Pyramids	Free	17 September 2022	
	MF	(Egypt) Mohamed Adel	(Egypt) Ceramica Cleopatra		19 September 2022	
	MF	(Egypt) Ahmed Mostafa	(Egypt) Smouha	€105,000	1 October 2022	
19	FW	(Egypt) Hazem Morsi	(Egypt) Ghazl El Mahalla	Loan	22 January 2023	

== Pre-season and friendlies ==
Win Draw Loss Fixtures

28 September 2022 Friendly	Ismaily (Egypt)	3–0	(Egypt) Al-Obour	Cairo
		Report

5 October 2022 Friendly	Ismaily (Egypt)	2–0	(Egypt) Tala'ea El Gaish	Ismailia
	Morsi; Chaouat	Report		Stadium: Ismailia Stadium

6 November 2022 Friendly	Ismaily (Egypt)	2–0	(Egypt) Al Rebat & Al Anwar	Ismailia
	Magdy; Morsi	Report		Stadium: Ismailia Stadium

8 November 2022 Friendly	Ismaily (Egypt)	2–1	(Egypt) Misr Lel Taamin	Ismailia
	Abdelsamia	Report		Stadium: Ismailia Stadium

1 February 2023 Friendly	Ismaily (Egypt)	4–0	(Sudan) Al-Merrikh	Ismailia
	Madbouly; Hassan; Taher; Farag	Report		Stadium: Ismailia Stadium

14 February 2023 Friendly	Ismaily (Egypt)	0–1	(Egypt) Aswan	Ismailia
		Report	Mohamed	Stadium: Ismailia Stadium

15 March 2023 Friendly	Ismaily (Egypt)	2–2	(Egypt) Haras El Hodoud	Cairo
	Al-Saei; Hassan		Mamdouh; Ziko (pen.)

21 March 2023 Friendly	Ismaily (Egypt)	1–3	Uganda	Ismailia
	Abdel Samiae 20'	Report	Bayo 15'; Basangwa 77' (pen.); Mato 81'

4 June 2023 Friendly	Ismaily (Egypt)	0–1	Yemen U23	Ismailia
		Report	Al-Dahi

== Competitions ==
=== Overview ===
Competition	First match	Last match	Starting round	Final position	Record							
Competition	First match	Last match	Starting round	Final position	Pld	W	D	L	GF	GA	GD	Win %
Egyptian Premier League	19 October 2022	15 July 2023	Matchday 1	11th	34	9	13	12	35	38	−3	26.47
Egypt Cup	24 May 2023		Round of 32	Round of 32	1	0	0	1	0	2	−2	0.00
EFA Cup	20 March 2023	29 April 2023	Round of 16	Quarter-finals	2	0	1	1	1	3	−2	0.00
Total					37	9	14	14	36	43	−7	24.32

Source: Soccerway

=== Egyptian Premier League ===
==== League table ====
Pos	Team	Pld	W	D	L	GF	GA	GD	Pts
9	Pharco	34	9	15	10	31	34	−3	42 (Note: Head-to-head points: Pharco 6, Smouha 0.)
10	Smouha	34	10	12	12	36	43	−7	42
11	Ismaily	34	9	13	12	35	38	−3	40
12	National Bank of Egypt	34	9	12	13	35	40	−5	39
13	Ceramica Cleopatra	34	7	16	11	31	32	−1	37

Source: Soccerway
Rules for classification: 1) Points; 2) Head-to-head points; 3) Head-to-head goal difference; 4) Goal difference; 5) Goals scored; 6) Play-off.

==== Results summary ====
Overall								Home						Away					
Pld	W	D	L	GF	GA	GD	Pts	W	D	L	GF	GA	GD	W	D	L	GF	GA	GD
29	7	12	10	29	34	−5	33	4	5	5	13	13	0	3	7	5	16	21	−5

Last updated: 31 May 2023.
Source: worldfootball

==== Results by round ====
Round	1	2	3	4	5	6	7	8	9	10	11	12	13	14	15	16	17	18	19	20	21	22	23	24	25	26	27	28	29	30	31	32
Ground	H	A	H	A	H	A	H	A	H	A	H	A	H	A	A	H	A	A	H	A	H	A	H	A	H	A	H	A	H	A	H	H
Result	L	L	D	D	L	D	L	W	L	L	D	L	L	D	D	W	D	P	D	D	D	W	D	L	W	W	W	L	W	D		
Position	14	16	14	14	16	16	16	14	16	18	17	18	18	18	18	17	17		17	16	17	15	15									

Updated to match(es) played on 31 May 2023. Source: worldfootball
A = Away; H = Home; W = Win; D = Draw; L = Loss

==== Matches ====
The league fixtures were announced on 9 October 2022.

19 October 2022 1	Ismaily	0–1	Al Ahly	Borg El Arab
17:00 EST (UTC+2)		Report	Hussein 73'	Stadium: Borg El Arab Stadium; Referee: Mohamed Adel

24 October 2022 2	Ghazl El Mahalla	2–1	Ismaily	El Mahalla El Kubra
15:00 EST (UTC+2)	El Sheikh 12'; Orok 75'	Report	Morsi 87'	Stadium: Ghazl El Mahalla Stadium; Referee: Ahmed Hamdi

23 November 2022 4	Pharco	1–1	Ismaily	Alexandria
17:00 EST (UTC+2)	Hamroune 48'	Report	Morsy 79'	Stadium: Alexandria Stadium; Referee: Mohamed Al Kalawy

2 December 2022 5	Ismaily	0–1	Smouha	Ismailia
14:45 EST (UTC+2)		Report	Sylla 25'	Stadium: Ismailia Stadium; Referee: Mohamed El Hanafi

8 December 2022 6	Ceramica Cleopatra	1–1	Ismaily	Suez
19:00 EST (UTC+2)	Nabil 40' (pen.)	Report	El Mohamady 69'	Stadium: Suez Stadium; Referee: Mahmoud El Banna

12 December 2022 3	Ismaily	0–0	Future	Ismailia
17:00 EST (UTC+2)		Report		Stadium: Ismailia Stadium; Referee: Sobhy El Amrawi

16 December 2022 7	Ismaily	1–2	Pyramids	Ismailia
14:45 EST (UTC+2)	Annor 32'	Report	Sobhi 9'; Issa 13'	Stadium: Ismailia Stadium; Referee: Abdelaziz El Sayed

20 December 2022 8	ENPPI	1–2	Ismaily	Cairo
14:45 EST (UTC+2)	Fawzy 90+9' (pen.)	Report	Annor 16'; El Mohamady 90+1' (pen.)	Stadium: Petrosport Stadium; Referee: Mohamed Maarouf

25 December 2022 9	Ismaily	0–1	Al Masry	Borg El Arab
14:45 EST (UTC+2)	El Wahsh (yellow card) 85'; Morsi (yellow card) 87'; Shabrawy (yellow card) 90+2'	Report	Grendo 8'; Abou Slemma (yellow card) 31' (yellow-red card) 70'; Eze (yellow card) 36'; Deghmoum (yellow card) 52'; Boubekeur (yellow card) 53'; Jelassi (yellow card) 59'	Stadium: Borg El Arab Stadium; Referee: Mohamed Al Kalawy

29 December 2022 10	Zamalek	3–1	Ismaily	Cairo
19:00 EST (UTC+2)	Osama 8'; Zizo 32' (pen.); El Sisi 45+2'	Report	Fatouh 3' (o.g.); Gomaa (yellow card) 11'; Nagguez (yellow card) 30'; Madbouly (yellow card) 49'	Stadium: Cairo International Stadium; Referee: Mahmoud El Banna

3 January 2023 11	Ismaily	0–0	National Bank	Ismailia
19:00 EST (UTC+2)		Report	Tawfik (yellow card) 63'; Diawara (yellow card) 90'	Stadium: Ismailia Stadium; Referee: Ahmed El Ghandour

8 January 2023 12	Haras El Hodoud	2–0	Ismaily	Cairo
14:45 EST (UTC+2)	Ziko 3', 59'; Sami (yellow card) 77'	Report	Hamdy (yellow card) 64'	Stadium: Cairo Military Academy Stadium; Referee: Mohammed Yousef
Note: The match was moved from Haras El Hodoud Stadium, at the request of both teams.

13 January 2023 13	Ismaily	1–3	Al Mokawloon Al Arab	Ismailia
19:00 EST (UTC+2)	Sobhy (yellow card) 36'; El Shamy 53'; Abou El Saoud (yellow card) 64'; El Mohamady (yellow card) 82'	Report	Saviola 50'; Niass 61'; Okoli 80'	Stadium: Ismailia Stadium; Referee: Mohamed El Hanafi

18 January 2023 14	Tala'ea El Gaish	1–1	Ismaily	Cairo
17:00 EST (UTC+2)	Tarek 4'; A. Samir (penalty missed) 79'; Osama (yellow card) 81'	Report	Madbouly (yellow card) 22'; Chaouat 45'; El Mohamady (yellow card) 77'	Stadium: Gehaz El Reyada Stadium; Referee: Ibrahim Nour El Din

23 January 2023 15	Aswan	0–0	Ismaily	Aswan
14:45 EST (UTC+2)	Belhadji (penalty missed) 27'; Ayagwa (yellow card) 31'	Report	El Shamy (yellow card) 45'; Madbouly (yellow card) 62'; Hassan (yellow card) 72'	Stadium: Aswan Stadium; Referee: Tarek Magdy

27 January 2023 16	Ismaily	3–1	El Dakhleya	Ismailia
17:00 EST (UTC+2)	Makhlouf 22'; Chaouat 41'; Abdel Samiae (yellow card) 42'; El Shamy 85'; Fawzy (yellow card) 90+4'	Report	Fawzy 75'	Stadium: Ismailia Stadium; Referee: Amin Omar

5 February 2023 17	Al Ittihad	1–1	Ismaily	Borg El Arab
19:00 EST (UTC+2)	Alaa 76'	Report	El Shamy 1'	Stadium: Borg El Arab Stadium; Referee: Mohammad Sabahi

21 February 2023 19	Ismaily	1–1	Ghazl El Mahalla	Ismailia
17:00 EST (UTC+2)	Hamdi 54'	Report	Atef 90+6'	Stadium: Ismailia Stadium; Referee: Nader Qamar El-Dawla

3 March 2023 20	Future	0–0	Ismaily	Cairo
17:00 EST (UTC+2)		Report		Stadium: Al Salam Stadium; Referee: Mohammad Sabahi

8 March 2023 21	Ismaily	0–0	Pharco	Ismailia
18:00 EST (UTC+2)		Report		Stadium: Ismailia Stadium; Referee: Mohamed Adel

30 March 2023 22	Smouha	1–3	Ismaily	Alexandria
21:15 EST (UTC+2)	Baayou 41'	Report	Madbouly 20'; Magdy 38'; El Shamy 40'; El Mohamady (penalty missed) 78'	Stadium: Alexandria Stadium; Referee: Mohamed Salama

3 April 2023 23	Ismaily	1–1	Ceramica Cleopatra	Ismailia
21:15 EST (UTC+2)	El Shamy 7'	Report	Teka 76'	Stadium: Ismailia Stadium; Referee: Abdelaziz El Sayed

13 April 2023 25	Ismaily	3–1	ENPPI	Ismailia
21:15 EST (UTC+2)	Chaouat 41', 45+2', 57'	Report	Hawash 70'	Stadium: Ismailia Stadium; Referee: Mohamed Al Kalawy

20 April 2023 26	Al Masry	1–2	Ismaily	Borg El Arab
21:15 EST (UTC+2)	Hawash 73' (pen.)	Report	Chaouat 60'; El Shamy 64'	Stadium: Borg El Arab Stadium; Referee: Nader Kamar

9 May 2023 24	Pyramids	3–1	Ismaily	Cairo
19:00 EST (UTC+3)	El Karti 14'; Issa 40'; Ben Youssef 77'	Report	Shabrawy 67'	Stadium: 30 June Stadium; Referee: Tarek Magdy
Note: The game, which was initially slated for 10 April 2023, was postponed.

13 May 2023 27	Ismaily	2–1	Zamalek	Ismailia
19:00 EST (UTC+3)	Annor 19'; Roqa 57' (o.g.)	Report	Ndiaye 38'	Stadium: Ismailia Stadium; Referee: Mohamed Adel
Note: The game, which was initially slated for 25 April 2023, was postponed.

17 May 2023 28	National Bank	2–0	Ismaily	Cairo
20:00 EST (UTC+3)	Bambo 34'; Helal 63' (pen.)	Report		Stadium: Cairo International Stadium; Referee: Ibrahim Nour El Din

21 May 2023 29	Ismaily	1–0	Haras El Hodoud	Ismailia
19:00 EST (UTC+3)	El Shamy 54'	Report		Stadium: Ismailia Stadium; Referee: Mahmoud Nagi

31 May 2023 30	Al Mokawloon Al Arab	2–2	Ismaily	Cairo
21:30 EST (UTC+3)	Saviola 17'; Okoli 79' (pen.)	Report	Chaouat 42'; El Shamy 90+19'	Stadium: Osman Ahmed Osman Stadium; Referee: Mohammed Yousef

8 June 2023 31	Ismaily	v	Tala'ea El Gaish	Ismailia
19:00 EST (UTC+3)		Report		Stadium: Ismailia Stadium

29 June 2023 32	Ismaily	v	Aswan	Ismailia
19:00 EST (UTC+3)		Report		Stadium: Ismailia Stadium

5 July 2023 18	Al Ahly	v	Ismaily	Cairo
20:30 EST (UTC+3)				Stadium: Cairo International Stadium
Note: The game, which was initially slated for 15 February 2023, was postponed because Al Ahly competed in the 2022 FIFA Club World Cup.

=== Egypt Cup ===
24 May 2023 Round of 32	Ismaily	0–2	Nogoom	Ismailia
18:00 EST (UTC+2)				Stadium: Ismailia Stadium

=== EFA Cup ===
20 March 2023 Round of 16	Ghazl El Mahalla	1–1 (6–7 p)	Ismaily	El Mahalla El Kubra
16:00 EST (UTC+2)	Mao 42'		Chaouat 2'	Stadium: Ghazl El Mahalla Stadium; Referee: Mohamed Al-Ghazi
	Penalties
	El Sheikh (penalty scored); Samy (penalty scored); Mao (penalty scored); Mostafa (penalty scored); Gaber (penalty scored); Reda (penalty scored); El Nadry (penalty missed)		(penalty scored) El Mohamady; (penalty scored) Chaouat; (penalty scored) El Wahsh; (penalty scored) Desouki; (penalty scored) Madbouli; (penalty scored) Hamdy; (penalty scored) Annor

29 April 2023 Quarter-finals	Al Masry	2–0	Ismaily	Borg El Arab
19:00 EST (UTC+2)				Stadium: Borg El Arab Stadium; Referee: Al Ghandour K.
