= 2023–24 Al Masry SC season =

Al Masry SC
2023–24 season
- Chairman: Kamel Abou-Aly
- Manager: Ali Maher
- Egyptian Premier League: 4th
- Egypt Cup: Semi-finals
- Egyptian League Cup: Semi-finals
- Top goalscorer: League: Mido Gaber; Fakhreddine Ben Youssef (8 each); All: Mido Gaber (14)

The 2023–24 Al Masry SC season was the club's 104th season in existence and the 11th consecutive season in the top flight of Egyptian football. In addition to the domestic league, Al Masry participated in this season's editions of the Egypt Cup, and the League Cup.

== Players ==
=== First-team squad ===
As of 18 September 2023

Note: Flags indicate national team as defined under FIFA eligibility rules; some limited exceptions apply. Players may hold more than one non-FIFA nationality.

No.	Pos.	Nation	Player
—	GK	EGY	Mahmoud Gad
—	DF	EGY	Hussein El Sayed
—	DF	EGY	Mohamed Dabash
—	DF	EGY	Baher El Mohamady
—	DF	EGY	Karim Al-Iraqi
—	DF	EGY	Ahmed Ayman Mansour
—	DF	EGY	Ahmed Eid
—	MF	NGR	Emeka Christian Eze
—	MF	EGY	Mahmoud Hamada
—	MF	EGY	Amr Moussa
—	MF	EGY	Hassan Ali

No.	Pos.	Nation	Player
—	MF	EGY	Mohamed El Shamy
—	MF	EGY	Youssef El Gohary
—	MF	TUN	Elyes Jelassi
—	MF	EGY	Mido Gaber
—	MF	EGY	Samir Fekri
—	MF	GUI	Amadou Bah
—	FW	EGY	Marwan Hamdy
—	FW	TUN	Fakhreddine Ben Youssef
—	FW	GHA	Listowel Amankona
—	MF	TUN	Mootez Zaddem

== Transfers ==
=== In ===
Pos.	Player	Transferred from	Fee	Date	Source
FW	(Egypt) Mohamed El Shamy	(Egypt) Ismaily	Free	25 July 2023	
MF	(Egypt) Mido Gaber	(Egypt) Ceramica Cleopatra		2 August 2023	
FW	(Egypt) Samir Fekri	(Egypt) El Dakhleya	€130,000	4 August 2023	
MF	(Egypt) Youssef El Gohary	(Egypt) Al Mokawloon Al Arab		14 August 2023	
DF	(Egypt) Baher El Mohamady	(Egypt) Ismaily	€593,000	15 August 2023	
DF	(Egypt) Ahmed Eid	(Egypt) Zamalek	Free	15 August 2023	
DF	(Egypt) Ahmed Ayman Mansour	(Egypt) Zamalek	Free	16 August 2023	
FW	(Ghana) Listowel Amankona	(Ghana) Real Tamale United		21 August 2023	
FW	(Tunisia) Fakhreddine Ben Youssef	(Egypt) Pyramids	Free	26 August 2023	
MF	(Guinea) Amadou Bah	(Moldova) Dinamo-Auto	Undisclosed	12 September 2023	
MF	(Egypt) Mahmoud Hamada	(Egypt) Pharco	€603,000	13 September 2023	
MF	(Tunisia) Mootez Zaddem	(Tunisia) Espérance de Tunis	Loan	31 January 2024	

=== Out ===
Pos.	Player	Transferred to	Fee	Date	Source
MF	(Egypt) Mohamed Grendo	National Bank of Egypt	Free	30 July 2023	
DF	(Egypt) Islam Al-Muzayen	(Egypt) Ceramica Cleopatra	Free	5 August 2023	
DF	(Egypt) Loai Fahmy	(Egypt) El Dakhleya	Loan	16 August 2023	
MF	(Egypt) Ahmed Shadad	(Egypt) El Dakhleya	Loan	16 August 2023	
FW	(Egypt) Zyad Farag	(Egypt) Al Mokawloon Al Arab	Loan	16 August 2023	
DF	(Egypt) Mostafa Aymad	(Egypt) Al Merreikh		19 August 2023	
DF	(Egypt) Ahmed Emad	(Egypt) El Dakhleya	Loan	19 August 2023	
DF	(Egypt) Saeed Kamal	(Egypt) El Sekka El Hadid		20 August 2023	
DF	(Egypt) Islam Abou Salima	(Egypt) Al Ittihad	Free	20 August 2023	
DF	(Algeria) Imadeddine Boubekeur	(Egypt) Al Mokawloon Al Arab	Free	28 August 2023	
MF	(Egypt) Farid Shawky	(Egypt) Tala'ea El Gaish	Free	11 September 2023	

== Pre-season and friendlies ==
Win Draw Loss

== Competitions ==
=== Overall record ===
Competition	First match	Last match	Starting round	Final position	Record							
Competition	First match	Last match	Starting round	Final position	Pld	W	D	L	GF	GA	GD	Win %
Egyptian Premier League	19 September 2023	18 August 2024	Matchday 1	4th	34	16	7	11	41	39	+2	47.06
Egypt Cup	30 May 2024		Round of 32		2	2	0	0	4	1	+3	100.00
Egyptian League Cup	9 January 2024	6 February 2024	Group stage	Semi-finals	5	3	2	0	9	5	+4	60.00
Total					41	21	9	11	54	45	+9	51.22

Last updated: 18 August 2024
Source: Soccerway

=== Egyptian Premier League ===
==== League table ====
Pos	Team	Pld	W	D	L	GF	GA	GD	Pts	Qualification or relegation
2	Pyramids	34	24	7	3	62	27	+35	79	Qualification for the Champions League first round
3	Zamalek	34	17	8	9	53	37	+16	56 (Note: Zamalek were deducted three points for refusing to play their away fixture against Al Ahly, scheduled to be played on 25 June 2024.)	Qualification for the Confederation Cup second round (Note: Zamalek qualified for the Confederation Cup second round by winning the 2023–24 CAF Confederation Cup.)
4	Al Masry	34	16	7	11	41	39	+2	55	Qualification for the Confederation Cup second round (Note: The league was not finished by the CAF deadline for associations to submit teams participating in next season's CAF competitions. As a result, Al Masry, who finished the first half of the season at third place (and were also at third place by the time of the draw) qualified for the CAF Confederation Cup.)
5	Modern Future	34	14	12	8	40	28	+12	54 (Note: Head-to-head points: Modern Future 4, Smouha 1.)	
6	Smouha	34	15	9	10	39	35	+4	54	

Source: Soccerway
Rules for classification: 1) Points; 2) Head-to-head points; 3) Head-to-head goal difference; 4) Goal difference; 5) Goals scored; 6) Play-off tie.
(Note: Head-to-head records are used for final standings only)

==== Results summary ====
Overall								Home						Away					
Pld	W	D	L	GF	GA	GD	Pts	W	D	L	GF	GA	GD	W	D	L	GF	GA	GD
34	16	7	11	41	39	+2	55	7	3	7	16	17	−1	9	4	4	25	22	+3

==== Results by round ====
Round	1	2
Ground	A	
Result	L	
Position	18	

A = Away; H = Home; W = Win; D = Draw; L = Loss

==== Matches ====
The league fixtures were unveiled on 11 September 2023.

19 September 2023 1	Al Ahly	4–0	Al Masry	Alexandria
19:00 UTC+3	Slim 44'; Dieng (yellow card) 65'; Tau 69', 74'; Fouad 88'	Report	Bah (yellow card) 11'; El Sayed (yellow card) 25'; El Mohamady (yellow card) 32' (yellow-red card) 52'	Stadium: Borg El Arab Stadium; Referee: Mohamed Adel

28 September 2023 2	Al Masry	1–0	Pharco	Alexandria
16:00 UTC+3	Hamdy (penalty missed) 40'; Gaber 54'	Report		Stadium: Borg El Arab Stadium; Referee: Hamada Al Qalawi

7 October 2023 3	El Dakhleya	1–3	Al Masry	Alexandria
17:00 UTC+3	Samir 81'		Gaber 8'; Hamdy 49'; El Mohamady 66'	Stadium: Borg El Arab Stadium; Referee: Mostafa El Shahdi

20 October 2023 4	Al Masry	1–0	Tala'ea El Gaish	Alexandria
				Stadium: Borg El Arab Stadium

27 October 2023 5	Pyramids	3–2	Al Masry	Alexandria
17:00 UTC+3	Mayele 45+2', 85'; Fathi 48'		El Shamy 82'; Guenaoui 88'	Stadium: Borg El Arab Stadium; Referee: Mahmoud Bassiouni

5 November 2023 6	Al Masry	0–4	National Bank	Alexandria
19:00 UTC+2			Faisal 1', 15', 62'; Bambo 54'	Stadium: Alexandria Stadium; Referee: Hisham Al-Qadi

1 December 2023 7	ENPPI	1–2	Al Masry	Alexandria
				Stadium: Borg El Arab Stadium

14 December 2023 9	Al Masry	1–0	Zamalek	Alexandria
19:00 UTC+2	Jelassi (penalty missed) 31'; Guenaoui 45+6'			Stadium: Borg El Arab Stadium; Referee: Mahmoud El Banna

1 January 2024 11	Al Masry	1–1	Ismaily	Alexandria
19:00 UTC+2	Ben Youssef 85'		Magdi 49'	Stadium: Borg El Arab Stadium; Referee: Ahmed El Ghandour

13 February 2024 12	El Gouna	2–2	Al Masry	Alexandria
16:00 UTC+2	Mahmoud 41'; Hossam 49'		Gaber 53' (pen.); El Shamy 90+2'	Stadium: Borg El Arab Stadium; Referee: Ibrahim Mohamed

20 February 2024 13	Al Masry	3–0	Baladiyat El Mahalla	Alexandria
19:00 UTC+2	Fekri 14'; El Saadawy 34'; Ben Youssef 87'			Stadium: Borg El Arab Stadium; Referee: Mohamed Kabeel

26 February 2024 14	Al Mokawloon	0–1	Al Masry	Alexandria
19:00 UTC+2	Salem (yellow card) 53'; Wael (yellow card) 89'		El Eraki (yellow card) 34'; Gaber (yellow card) 37'; Zaddem 70'; Moussa (yellow card) 90+2'	Stadium: Borg El Arab Stadium; Referee: Ahmed Gamal

5 March 2024 15	Al Masry	2–0	Smouha	Alexandria
19:00 UTC+2	Ben Youssef 9'; Zaddem 76'			Stadium: Borg El Arab Stadium; Referee: Mohamed El Atabani

12 March 2024 16	ZED	2–2	Al Masry	Alexandria
21:30 UTC+2	El Banouby 21'; Hussein 80'		El Shamy 54'; Gaber 90+8' (pen.)	Stadium: Borg El Arab Stadium; Referee: Mostafa Osman

4 April 2024 17	Al Masry	2–3	Al Ittihad	Alexandria
				Stadium: Borg El Arab Stadium

11 April 2024 8	Al Masry	1–2	Modern Future	Alexandria
				Stadium: Borg El Arab Stadium

14 April 2024 10	Ceramica Cleopatra	1–1	Al Masry	Alexandria
				Stadium: Borg El Arab Stadium

19 April 2024 18	Al Masry	v	Al Ahly	Alexandria
				Stadium: Borg El Arab Stadium

23 April 2024 19	Pharco	1–2	Al Masry	Alexandria
				Stadium: Borg El Arab Stadium

28 April 2024 20	Al Masry	1–0	El Dakhleya	Alexandria
16:00				Stadium: Borg El Arab Stadium

6 May 2024 21	Tala'ea El Gaish	0–2	Al Masry	Alexandria
				Stadium: Borg El Arab Stadium

11 May 2024 22	Al Masry	0–1	Pyramids	Alexandria
19:00				Stadium: Borg El Arab Stadium

16 May 2024 23	National Bank	5–2	Al Masry	Alexandria
				Stadium: Borg El Arab Stadium

20 May 2024 24	Al Masry	0–0	ENPPI	Alexandria
16:00				Stadium: Borg El Arab Stadium

26 May 2024 25	Modern Future	0–0	Al Masry	Alexandria
19:00				Stadium: Borg El Arab Stadium

17 June 2024 26	Zamalek	1–2	Al Masry	Alexandria
19:00				Stadium: Borg El Arab Stadium

23 June 2024 27	Al Masry	0–2	Ceramica Cleopatra	Alexandria
19:00				Stadium: Borg El Arab Stadium

27 June 2024 28	Ismaily	0–1	Al Masry	Alexandria
19:00				Stadium: Borg El Arab Stadium

1 July 2024 29	Al Masry	2–1	El Gouna

7 July 2024 30	Baladiyat El Mahalla	0–1	Al Masry

21 July 2024 31	Al Masry	1–1	Al Mokawloon Al Arab

1 August 2024 32	Smouha	1–0	Al Masry

14 August 2024 33	Al Masry	0–1	ZED

18 August 2024 34	Al Ittihad	0–2	Al Masry

=== Egypt Cup ===
30 May 2024 Round of 32	Al Masry	1–0	Gomhoriat Shebin	Alexandria
17:00	Gaber 30'	Report		Stadium: Borg El Arab Stadium; Referee: Abdel Hakim Nasser

9 August 2024 Round of 16	National Bank	1–3	Al Masry	Alexandria
21:00				Stadium: Borg El Arab Stadium

22 August 2024 Quarter-finals	Pharco	v	Al Masry
