= 2021–22 Ismaily SC season =

Ismaily SC
2021–22 season
- Chairman: Yahya El-Koumi
- Manager: Juan Brown (from 13 November); Hamza El-Gamal (from 2 May)
- Stadium: Ismailia Stadium
- Egyptian Premier League: 11th
- Egypt Cup: Round of 16
- EFA Cup: Semi-finals
- Top goalscorer: League: Mohamed El Shamy (6); All: Mohamed El Shamy (6)

The 2021–22 Ismaily SC season was the club's 101st season in existence and the 51st consecutive season in the top flight of Egyptian football. In addition to the domestic league, Ismaily participated in this season's editions of the Egypt Cup and the EFA Cup.

== Transfers ==
=== In ===
No.	Pos	Player	Transferred from	Fee	Date	Source
	FW	(Bolivia) Carmelo Algarañaz	(Bolivia) Always Ready	Loan	1 January 2022	
	FW	(The Gambia) Saikou Conteh	(Egypt) El Sekka El Hadid		8 January 2022	
	FW	(Palestine) Khaled Al-Nabris	(Palestine) Ittihad Khanyounis		26 January 2022	

== Competitions ==
=== Overall record ===
Competition	First match	Last match	Starting round	Final position	Record							
Competition	First match	Last match	Starting round	Final position	Pld	W	D	L	GF	GA	GD	Win %
Egyptian Premier League	27 October 2021	30 August 2022	Matchday 1	11th	34	9	11	14	27	39	−12	26.47
Egypt Cup	12 March 2022	15 August 2022	Round of 32	Round of 16	2	0	1	1	0	1	−1	0.00
EFA Cup	17 January 2022	3 July 2022	Group stage	Semi-finals	6	2	4	0	9	5	+4	33.33
Total					42	11	16	15	36	45	−9	26.19

Source: Soccerway

=== Egyptian Premier League ===
==== League table ====
Pos	Team	Pld	W	D	L	GF	GA	GD	Pts
9	ENPPI	34	8	15	11	37	39	−2	39
10	Al Mokawloon Al Arab	34	8	14	12	30	31	−1	38 (Note: Head-to-Head points: Al Mokawloon Al Arab 12, Ismaily 11, Al Ittihad 5, Al Masry 4.)
11	Ismaily	34	9	11	14	27	39	−12	38
12	Al Ittihad	34	9	11	14	40	52	−12	38
13	Al Masry	34	8	14	12	40	41	−1	38

Source: Soccerway
Rules for classification: 1) Points; 2) Head-to-Head points; 3) Head-to-Head goal difference; 4) Head-to-Head goals scored; 5) Head-to-Head away goals scored; 6) Goal difference; 7) Goals scored.
(Note: Head-to-head record is used only after all the matches between the teams in question have been played).

==== Results summary ====
Overall								Home						Away					
Pld	W	D	L	GF	GA	GD	Pts	W	D	L	GF	GA	GD	W	D	L	GF	GA	GD
34	9	11	14	27	39	−12	38	5	6	6	11	19	−8	4	5	8	16	20	−4

Source: worldfootball

==== Results by round ====
Round	1	2	3	4	5	6	7	8	9	10	11	12	13	14	15	16	17	18	19	20	21	22	23	24	25	26	27	28	29	30	31	32	33	34
Ground	H	A	A	H	A	H	A	H	A	H	A	H	A	H	A	H	A	A	H	H	A	H	A	H	A	H	A	H	A	H	A	H	A	H
Result	L	L	L	L	D	D	L	D	L	L	D	D	W	W	W	L	L	D	W	D	L	D	D	W	W	L	W	W	D	W	L	D	L	L
Position																																		

Source: worldfootball
A = Away; H = Home; W = Win; D = Draw; L = Loss

==== Matches ====
The league fixtures were announced on 12 October 2021.

27 October 2021 1	Ismaily	0–4	Al Ahly	Borg El Arab
20:00 EST (UTC+2)		Report		Stadium: Borg El Arab Stadium

31 October 2021 2	Ceramica Cleopatra	2–1	Ismaily	Cairo
15:00 EST (UTC+2)		Report		Stadium: Osman Ahmed Osman Stadium

4 November 2021 3	National Bank	1–0	Ismaily	Cairo
15:00 EST (UTC+2)	Helal 70'	Report		Stadium: Petrosport Stadium

19 November 2021 4	Ismaily	0–2	Zamalek	Ismailia
17:30 EST (UTC+2)		Report		Stadium: Ismailia Stadium

23 November 2021 5	Al Mokawloon	1–1	Ismaily	Cairo
17:30 EST (UTC+2)	Salem 78'	Report	Hashem 75'	Stadium: Osman Ahmed Osman Stadium

26 November 2021 6	Ismaily	0–0	Ghazl El Mahalla	Ismailia
EST (UTC+2)				Stadium: Ismailia Stadium

21 December 2021 7	Smouha	2–1	Ismaily	Alexandria
15:00 EST (UTC+2)	Abdel Fattah 33'; Ougola 90+4'	Report	Naguib 45+3' (pen.)	Stadium: Alexandria Stadium

10 February 2022 8	Ismaily	0–0	Future	Ismailia
EST (UTC+2)				Stadium: Ismailia Stadium

16 February 2022 9	Pyramids	1–0	Ismaily	Cairo
17:30 EST (UTC+2)	Samy 64'	Report		Stadium: 30 June Stadium

23 February 2022 10	Ismaily	0–1	El Gouna	Ismailia
EST (UTC+2)				Stadium: Ismailia Stadium

1 March 2022 11	Misr Lel Makkasa	2–2	Ismaily	Cairo
17:30 EST (UTC+2)		Report		Stadium: Cairo Military Academy Stadium

7 March 2022 12	Ismaily	0–0	Pharco	Ismailia
EST (UTC+2)				Stadium: Ismailia Stadium

16 March 2022 13	Al-Ittihad	1–2	Ismaily	Alexandria
17:30 EST (UTC+2)	El Ghandour 27'	Report	El Shamy 24'; Adel 64'	Stadium: Alexandria Stadium

18 April 2022 15	Eastern Company	0–2	Ismaily	Cairo
21:30 EST (UTC+2)		Report		Stadium: Petrosport Stadium

26 April 2022 16	Ismaily	0–2	ENPPI	Ismailia
EST (UTC+2)				Stadium: Ismailia Stadium

30 April 2022 17	El Gaish	1–0	Ismaily	Cairo
21:30 EST (UTC+2)		Report		Stadium: Gehaz El Reyada Stadium; Referee: Amin Omar

6 May 2022 14	Ismaily	3–2	Al Masry	Ismailia
EST (UTC+2)				Stadium: Ismailia Stadium

15 May 2022 19	Ismaily	2–0	Ceramica Cleopatra	Ismailia
EST (UTC+2)				Stadium: Ismailia Stadium

22 May 2022 20	Ismaily	2–2	National Bank	Ismailia
EST (UTC+2)				Stadium: Ismailia Stadium

28 May 2022 21	Zamalek	2–1	Ismaily	Cairo
18:30 EST (UTC+2)		Report		Stadium: Cairo International Stadium; Referee: Ibrahim Nour El Din

17 June 2022 22	Ismaily	0–0	Al Mokawloon	Ismailia
EST (UTC+2)				Stadium: Ismailia Stadium

28 June 2022 23	Ghazl El Mahalla	0–0	Ismaily	El Mahalla El Kubra
19:00 EST (UTC+2)		Report		Stadium: El Mahalla Stadium

13 July 2022 24	Ismaily	1–0	Smouha	Ismailia
EST (UTC+2)				Stadium: Ismailia Stadium

16 July 2022 25	Future	1–2	Ismaily	Cairo
18:30 EST (UTC+2)		Report		Stadium: Al Salam Stadium

24 July 2022 26	Ismaily	0–4	Pyramids	Ismailia
EST (UTC+2)				Stadium: Ismailia Stadium

28 July 2022 27	El Gouna	0–3	Ismaily	El Gouna
18:30 EST (UTC+2)		Report		Stadium: Khaled Bichara Stadium

1 August 2022 28	Ismaily	1–0	Misr Lel Makkasa	Ismailia
EST (UTC+2)				Stadium: Ismailia Stadium

6 August 2022 29	Pharco	0–0	Ismaily	Alexandria
18:30 EST (UTC+2)		Report		Stadium: Alexandria Stadium

11 August 2022 30	Ismaily	1–0	Al-Ittihad	Ismailia
EST (UTC+2)				Stadium: Ismailia Stadium

18 August 2022 31	Al Masry	4–1	Ismaily	Borg El Arab
18:30 EST (UTC+2)		Report		Stadium: Borg El Arab Stadium

21 August 2022 18	Al Ahly	0–0	Ismaily	Cairo
21:00 EST (UTC+2)		Report		Stadium: Al Salam Stadium; Referee: Mohamed El Hanafi

24 August 2022 32	Ismaily	1–1	Eastern Company	Ismailia
17:30 EST (UTC+2)	El Shamy 25'	Report	Meteb 46'	Stadium: Ismailia Stadium; Referee: Mahmoud Bassiouni

27 August 2022 33	ENPPI	2–0	Ismaily	Cairo
16:00 EST (UTC+2)	Shakshak 37'; Fawzi 73' (pen.)	Report		Stadium: Petrosport Stadium; Referee: Mahmoud El Dessoky

30 August 2022 34	Ismaily	0–1	El Gaish	Ismailia
18:30 EST (UTC+2)		Report	Osama 34'	Stadium: Ismailia Stadium; Referee: Mahmoud Ashour

=== EFA Cup ===
==== Group stage ====
17 January 2022 1	Ismaily	1–1	Al Ahly	Ismailia
14:30 EST (UTC+2)				Stadium: Ismailia Stadium

21 January 2022 2	Ismaily	1–1	National Bank	Ismailia
14:30 EST (UTC+2)				Stadium: Ismailia Stadium

27 January 2022 3	Al Mokawloon Al Arab	0–0	Ismaily	Cairo
14:30 EST (UTC+2)				Stadium: Osman Ahmed Osman Stadium

31 January 2022 4	Ismaily	4–1	El Gouna	Ismailia
17:00 EST (UTC+2)				Stadium: Ismailia Stadium

==== Knockout stage ====
3 July 2022 Semi-finals	Ismaily	2–2 (3–4 p)	Ghazl El Mahalla	Cairo
18:00 EST (UTC+2)	Wahesh 80' (pen.); Nabris 96'		El Henawy 4' (pen.); Mao 118'	Stadium: Osman Ahmed Osman Stadium
	Penalties
	Magdy (penalty missed); Ayman (penalty missed); Adel (penalty scored); Mostafa (penalty scored); Nabris (penalty scored)		(penalty scored) El Henawy; (penalty scored) Mao; (penalty missed) Sami; (penalty scored) El Akhmimi; (penalty scored) El Sheikh
