= 2024–25 Al Masry SC season =

Al Masry
2024–25 season
- Chairman: Kamel Abou-Aly
- Manager: Ali Maher
- Stadium: Suez Stadium
- Egyptian Premier League: 4th
- Egypt Cup: Round of 16
- Egyptian League Cup: Group stage
- CAF Confederation Cup: Quarter-finals
- Top goalscorer: League: Mohamed El Shamy; Salah Mohsen (2 each); All: Salah Mohsen (6)
- All statistics correct as of 19 January 2025.

The 2024–25 season is the 105th season in Al Masry's history and the 54th consecutive season in the Premier League. In addition to the domestic league, Al Masry is set to compete in the domestic cup, the Egyptian League Cup and the CAF Confederation Cup.

== Transfers ==
=== In ===
Date	Pos.	Player	From	Fee	Ref.
21 August 2024	FW	(Egypt) Karim Bambo	(Egypt) National Bank	Free	
29 August 2024	MF	(Egypt) Khaled El Ghandour	(Egypt) Al Ittihad	Free	
2 September 2024	GK	(Egypt) Mahmoud Hamdy	(Egypt) Modern Sport	Free	
9 September 2024	FW	(Senegal) Pape Badji	(Morocco) MA Tétouan	Free	
12 September 2024	MF	(Egypt) Ahmed El Armouty	(Egypt) Ceramica Cleopatra	€131,000	
12 September 2024	DF	(Egypt) Khaled Sobhi	(Egypt) Ceramica Cleopatra	€187,000	
26 September 2024	MF	(Benin) Samadou Attidjikou	(Benin) Bani Gansè FC	Undisclosed	

=== Out ===
Date	Pos.	Player	To	Fee	Ref.
21 August 2024	MF	(Egypt) Hossam Greisha	(Egypt) Ghazl El Mahalla	€76,000	
28 August 2024	MF	(Nigeria) Emeka Christian Eze	(Egypt) Haras El Hodoud	Free	
3 September 2024	DF	(Egypt) Amr Moussa		End of contract	
3 September 2024	MF	(Egypt) Zyad Farag	(Egypt) Petrojet	Loan	
4 September 2024	FW	(Cameroon) Franck Mbella Etouga	(Moldova) CSF Spartanii Sportul	Loan	
8 September 2024	MF	(Egypt) Islam Ateia	(Egypt) Smouha	Undisclosed	
10 October 2024	DF	(Egypt) Hussein El Sayed	(Egypt) Ceramica Cleopatra	Undisclosed	

== Friendlies ==
7 September 2024 Friendly	Al Masry (Egypt)	3–0	(Egypt) Petrol Asyout	Cairo
		Report		Stadium: Cairo Military Academy Stadium

15 October 2024 Friendly	CR Bernoussi (Morocco)	0–2	(Egypt) Al Masry	Mohammedia, Morocco
		Report	Badji 30'; Hafidi 90+2'	Stadium: Lanoria Club Stadium

17 October 2024 Friendly	Association Al Mansoria (Morocco)	2–1	(Egypt) Al Masry	Mohammedia, Morocco
	21'; 35'	Report	Hamada 45' (pen.)	Stadium: Lanoria Club Stadium

21 October 2024 Friendly	Ittifaq Marrakech (Morocco)	2–3	(Egypt) Al Masry	Mohammedia, Morocco
15:00 UTC+1		Report		Stadium: Lanoria Club Stadium

31 October 2024 Friendly	Al Masry (Egypt)	4–0	(Egypt) Al-Amiriya	Cairo
16:00 UTC+3	Gaber 9'; Badji 12'; Amankona 67'; Bambo 89'	Report		Stadium: Cairo Military Academy Stadium

16 November 2024 Friendly	Al Masry (Egypt)	3–0	(Egypt) Diamond
		Report

17 November 2024 Friendly	Al Masry (Egypt)	7–1	(Egypt) Raa Sport

29 November 2024 Friendly	Al Masry (Egypt)	11–0	(Egypt) Al-Qalyubia Union
		Report

== Competitions ==
=== Overall record ===
Competition	First match	Last match	Starting round	Final position	Record							
Competition	First match	Last match	Starting round	Final position	Pld	W	D	L	GF	GA	GD	Win %
Egyptian Premier League regular season	30 October 2024	3 March 2025	Matchday 1	4th	17	8	6	3	19	11	+8	47.06
Egyptian Premier League Championship round	12 March 2025	May 2025	Matchday 1		2	1	1	0	4	0	+4	50.00
Egypt Cup	4 February 2025	7 March 2025	Round of 32	Round of 16	2	1	0	1	2	3	−1	50.00
Egyptian League Cup	19 March 2025		Group stage		3	0	3	0	3	3	+0	0.00
CAF Confederation Cup	15 September 2024	9 April 2025	Second round	Quarter-finals	10	4	3	3	14	11	+3	40.00
Total					34	14	13	7	42	28	+14	41.18

Last updated: 13 April 2025
Source: Competitions

=== Egyptian Premier League ===
==== Regular season ====
Pos	Team	Pld	W	D	L	GF	GA	GD	Pts	Qualification or relegation
2	Al Ahly	17	11	6	0	30	9	+21	39	Qualification for the championship play-offs
3	Zamalek	17	9	5	3	30	16	+14	32	Qualification for the championship play-offs
4	Al Masry	17	8	6	3	19	11	+8	30	Qualification for the championship play-offs
5	National Bank of Egypt	17	8	5	4	22	18	+4	29	Qualification for the championship play-offs
6	Ceramica Cleopatra	17	6	6	5	23	21	+2	24	Qualification for the championship play-offs

Source: Soccerway (regular season)
Rules for classification: 1) Points; 2) Goal difference; 3) Goals scored.

===== Results summary =====
Overall								Home						Away					
Pld	W	D	L	GF	GA	GD	Pts	W	D	L	GF	GA	GD	W	D	L	GF	GA	GD
8	4	3	1	6	3	+3	15	2	1	1	2	2	0	2	2	0	4	1	+3

Last updated: 16 January 2025.

===== Results by round =====
Round	1	2	3	4	5	6	7	8	9
Ground	A	H	A	H	A	H	A	H	A
Result	W	D	W	W	D	L	D	W	
Position	3	4	3	1	1	5			

Updated to match(es) played on 16 January 2025. Source:
A = Away; H = Home; W = Win; D = Draw; L = Loss

===== Matches =====
The league schedule was released on 19 October 2024.

30 October 2024 1	Tala'ea El Gaish	0–2	Al Masry	Suez
20:00 UTC+3	Mohareb (red card) 21'		Mohsen 52'; Hamada 87'	Stadium: Suez Stadium; Referee: Tarek Magdy

9 November 2024 2	Al Masry	0–0	El Gouna	Suez
17:00 UTC+2				Stadium: Suez Stadium; Referee: Ibrahim Mohamed

23 November 2024 3	Zamalek	0–1	Al Masry	Alexandria
20:00 UTC+2			El Shamy 45+3'	Stadium: Borg El Arab Stadium; Referee: Mohamed El Hanafy

2 December 2024 4	Al Masry	1–0	Pyramids	Suez
17:00 UTC+2	El Shamy 55'			Stadium: Suez Stadium; Referee: Amin Omar

19 December 2024 5	Haras El Hodoud	0–0	Al Masry	Suez
17:00 UTC+2				Stadium: Suez Stadium; Referee: Ibrahim Mohamed

26 December 2024 6	Al Masry	0–2	Al Ahly	Alexandria
20:00 UTC+2			Attiyat Allah 39'; Afsha 90+6'	Stadium: Borg El Arab Stadium; Referee: Mahmoud El Banna

31 December 2024 7	Ceramica Cleopatra	1–1	Al Masry	Suez
15:00 UTC+2	Zalaka 54'; Lakay (penalty missed) 72'		Mohsen 81'	Stadium: Suez Stadium; Referee: Mahmoud Nagi

16 January 2025 8	Al Masry	1–0	Pharco	Suez
19:00 UTC+2	Makhlouf 20'; Gad (red card) 75'			Stadium: Suez Stadium

23 January 2025 9	Petrojet	v	Al Masry
16:00 UTC+2

==== Championship round ====
Pos	Team	Pld	W	D	L	GF	GA	GD	Pts	Qualification
2	Pyramids	8	4	2	2	15	10	+5	56	Qualification for the Champions League first or second round
3	Zamalek	8	4	3	1	14	6	+8	47	Qualification for the Confederation Cup first or second round
4	Al Masry	8	3	3	2	10	9	+1	42	Qualification for the Confederation Cup first or second round
5	National Bank of Egypt SC	8	2	3	3	13	12	+1	38	
6	Ceramica Cleopatra	8	4	1	3	15	12	+3	37	

Source: Soccerway (championship round)
Rules for classification: 1) Points; 2) Goal difference; 3) Goals scored; 4) Play-off tie.
(Note: Clubs qualified for this phase with the full regular season points they got, but without goals for or against)

===== Matches =====
12 March 2025 1	Pyramids	0–0	Al Masry	Cairo
21:30 UTC+2				Stadium: 30 June Stadium

=== Egypt Cup ===
4 February 2025 Round of 32	Al Masry	v	Wadi Degla	Suez
14:30 UTC+2				Stadium: Suez Stadium

=== Egyptian League Cup ===
==== Group stage ====
Pos	Team	Pld	W	D	L	GF	GA	GD	Pts	Qualification
1	National Bank	4	2	2	0	9	3	+6	8	Advance to knockout stage
2	Ceramica Cleopatra	4	2	1	1	8	7	+1	7	Advance to knockout stage
3	Ghazl El Mahalla	4	1	2	1	4	5	−1	5	
4	Al Masry	4	0	4	0	3	3	0	4	
5	ZED	4	0	1	3	4	10	−6	1	

Source: EPL
Rules for classification: Group stage tiebreakers

19 March 2025 1	Al Masry	v	ZED	Suez
21:00 UTC+2				Stadium: Suez Stadium

24 March 2025 2	National Bank	v	Al Masry	Suez
21:00 UTC+2				Stadium: Suez Stadium

2 April 2025 3	Al Masry	v	Ceramica Cleopatra	Suez
20:00 UTC+3				Stadium: Suez Stadium

23 April 2025 4	Ghazl El Mahalla	v	Al Masry	Suez
20:00 UTC+3				Stadium: Suez Stadium

=== CAF Confederation Cup ===
==== Second round ====
15 September 2024 First leg	Al-Hilal Benghazi (Libya)	3–2	(Egypt) Al Masry	Benghazi, Libya
19:00 UTC+2	Al-Shiteewi 64', 85'; Al-Badri 72'		Mohsen 45+4', 69'	Stadium: Benina Martyrs Stadium; Referee: Tanguy Mebiame (Gabon)

22 September 2024 Second leg	Al Masry (Egypt)	3–2 (5–5 agg.) (5–3 p)	(Libya) Al-Hilal Benghazi	Alexandria
19:00 UTC+3	Mohsen 18', 39'; Ben Youssef 83'		El Mohamady 14' (o.g.); Onana 90'	Stadium: Borg El Arab Stadium; Referee: Samir Guezzaz (Morocco)
	Penalties
	Gaber (penalty scored); Ben Youssef (penalty scored); Hamada (penalty scored); Ali (penalty scored); Dabash (penalty scored)		(penalty scored) Al-Badri; (penalty missed) Rezk; (penalty scored) Saad; (penalty scored) El Maremi

==== Group stage ====
The group stage draw was held on 7 October 2024.

Pos	Team	Pld	W	D	L	GF	GA	GD	Pts	Qualification	ZAM	MAS	ENY	ABB
1	(Egypt) Zamalek	6	4	2	0	11	4	+7	14	Advance to knockout stage	—	1–0	3–1	2–0
2	(Egypt) Al Masry	6	2	3	1	7	4	+3	9	Advance to knockout stage	0–0	—	2–0	3–1
3	(Nigeria) Enyimba	6	1	2	3	8	12	−4	5		2–2	1–1	—	4–1
4	(Mozambique) Black Bulls	6	1	1	4	7	13	−6	4		1–3	1–1	3–0	—

Source: CAF
Rules for classification: Group stage tiebreakers

27 November 2024 1	Al Masry (Egypt)	2–0	(Nigeria) Enyimba	Suez
18:00 UTC+2	Hamada 5', 74'	Report		Stadium: Suez Stadium; Referee: Boubou Traoré (Mali)

8 December 2024 2	Black Bulls (Mozambique)	1–1	(Egypt) Al Masry	Maputo, Mozambique
21:00 UTC+2	Nené 90+2'	Report	Gaber 10'	Stadium: Estádio do Zimpeto; Referee: Joseph Ogabor (Nigeria)

15 December 2024 3	Zamalek (Egypt)	1–0	(Egypt) Al Masry	Alexandria
18:00 UTC+2	Zizo 63'	Report		Stadium: Borg El Arab Stadium; Referee: Mustapha Ghorbal (Algeria)

5 January 2025 4	Al Masry (Egypt)	0–0	(Egypt) Zamalek	Alexandria
18:00 UTC+2		Report		Stadium: Borg El Arab Stadium; Referee: Lahlou Benbraham (Algeria)

12 January 2025 5	Enyimba (Nigeria)	1–1	(Egypt) Al Masry	Uyo, Nigeria
17:00 UTC+1	Ihemekwele 47'	Report	Hashem 8'; Hamada (penalty missed) 68'	Stadium: Godswill Akpabio Stadium; Referee: Omar Abdulkadir Artan (Somalia)

19 January 2025 6	Al Masry (Egypt)	3–1	(Mozambique) Black Bulls	Suez
18:00 UTC+2	Ali (penalty missed) 15'; Ben Youssef 22', 42', 45'		Akporoh 57'	Stadium: Suez Stadium; Referee: Jeannot Franck Bito (Cameroon)

==== Quarter-finals ====
2 April 2025 First leg	Al Masry (Egypt)	2–0	(Tanzania) Simba	Suez
18:00 UTC+2	Deghmoum 16'; Ebuka 89'	Report		Stadium: Suez Stadium; Referee: Boubou Traoré (Mali)

9 April 2025 Second leg	Simba (Tanzania)	2–0 (4–1 p)	(Egypt) Al Masry	Dar es Salaam, Tanzania
16:00 UTC+3	Mpanzu 22'; Mukwala 32'	Report		Stadium: Benjamin Mkapa Stadium; Referee: Djindo Louis Houngnandande (Benin)
	Penalties
	Ahoua (penalty scored); Mukwala (penalty scored); Denis (penalty scored); Kapombe (penalty scored)		(penalty missed) Gaber; (penalty scored) Ben Youssef; (penalty missed) Hamada
