= 2023–24 Ismaily SC season =

Ismaily SC
2023–24 season
- Chairman: Nasr Abu Al-Hassan
- Manager: Ehab Galal
- Stadium: Ismailia Stadium
- Egyptian Premier League: 14th
- Egypt Cup: Semi-finals
- League Cup: Group stage
- Top goalscorer: League: Abdel Rahman Magdy (8); All: Abdel Rahman Magdy (8)

The 2023–24 Ismaily SC season was the club's 103rd season in existence and the 53rd consecutive season in the top flight of Egyptian football. In addition to the domestic league, Ismaily participated in this season's editions of the Egypt Cup, and the League Cup.

== Players ==
=== First-team squad ===
As of 18 September 2023

Note: Flags indicate national team as defined under FIFA eligibility rules; some limited exceptions apply. Players may hold more than one non-FIFA nationality.

No.	Pos.	Nation	Player
—	GK	EGY	Ahmed Adel Abdel Moneim
—	GK	EGY	Mohamed Fawzy
—	GK	EGY	Kamal El Sayed
—	DF	EGY	Mohamed Hashem
—	DF	EGY	Mohamed Nasser
—	DF	EGY	Iyad Al-Asqalani
—	DF	EGY	Mohamed Ammar
—	DF	EGY	Mohamed Desouki
—	DF	EGY	Issam Sobhi
—	DF	EGY	Ahmed Mohsen
—	DF	TUN	Hamdi Nagguez
—	DF	EGY	Karim Arafat

No.	Pos.	Nation	Player
—	MF	EGY	Imad Hamdy
—	MF	EGY	Mohamed Makhlouf
—	MF	EGY	Mohamed Hassan
—	MF	EGY	Marwan Hamdi
—	MF	EGY	Mohamed Abdel Samie
—	MF	EGY	Abdel Rahman Magdy
—	MF	EGY	Omar Al Saei
—	MF	EGY	Abdallah Al Saeed
—	MF	EGY	Mohamed El Shabrawy
—	FW	EGY	Bassem Morsi
—	FW	GHA	Yaw Annor
—	FW	EGY	Nader Farag

== Transfers ==
=== In ===
Pos.	Player	Transferred from	Fee	Date	Source

=== Out ===
Pos.	Player	Transferred to	Fee	Date	Source
MF	(Egypt) Ahmed Madbouly	(Egypt) National Bank	Free	22 July 2023	
FW	(Egypt) Mohamed El Shamy	(Egypt) Al Masry	Free	25 July 2023	
MF	(Ivory Coast) Serge Arnaud Aka	(Egypt) National Bank	Free	28 July 2023	
FW	(Tunisia) Firas Chaouat	(Bahrain) Al-Muharraq	Free	1 August 2023	
DF	(Egypt) Baher El Mohamady	(Egypt) Al Masry	€593,000	15 August 2023	
FW	(Ivory Coast) Jean Morel Poé	(Ukraine) Kryvbas Kryvyi Rih	Free	28 August 2023	
MF	(Egypt) Omar El Wahsh	(Egypt) Al Ittihad	Free	14 September 2023	

== Pre-season and friendlies ==
Win Draw Loss

22 August 2023 Friendly	Ismaily (Egypt)	2–0	(Egypt) Fayed	Ismailia
				Stadium: Ismailia Stadium

23 August 2023 Friendly	Ismaily (Egypt)	0–0	(Saudi Arabia) Al-Jeel	Ismailia
				Stadium: Ismailia Stadium

28 August 2023 Friendly	Ismaily (Egypt)	3–0	(Egypt) Gamarek SC	Ismailia
	El Wahsh 16', 29'; Saber 89'	Report		Stadium: Ismailia Stadium

29 August 2023 Friendly	Ismaily (Egypt)	1–2	(Egypt) ENPPI

1 September 2023 Friendly	Ismaily (Egypt)	3–0	(Egypt) Orange	Ismailia
	El Wahsh; Hamdy; Farag	Report		Stadium: Ismailia Stadium

5 September 2023 Friendly	Future (Egypt)	0–1	(Egypt) Ismaily	Cairo
			Magdy	Stadium: Al Salam Stadium

6 September 2023 Friendly	Ismaily (Egypt)	0–1	(Egypt) El Gouna	Ismailia
			50'	Stadium: Ismailia Stadium

11 September 2023 Friendly	Ismaily (Egypt)	2–2	(Bahrain) Sitra	Ismailia
	Hashem; Al Saeed			Stadium: Ismailia Stadium

12 September 2023 Friendly	Ismaily (Egypt)	2–2	(Egypt) Baladiyat El Mahalla	Ismailia
				Stadium: Ismailia Stadium

== Competitions ==
=== Overall record ===
Competition	First match	Last match	Starting round	Final position	Record							
Competition	First match	Last match	Starting round	Final position	Pld	W	D	L	GF	GA	GD	Win %
Egyptian Premier League	19 September 2023	August 2024	Matchday 1	14th	34	7	12	15	33	43	−10	20.59
Egypt Cup	30 May 2024	27 August 2024	Round of 32	Semi-finals	4	2	1	1	5	3	+2	50.00
Egyptian League Cup	8 January 2024	24 January 2024	Group stage	Group stage	3	0	0	3	1	5	−4	0.00
Total					41	9	13	19	39	51	−12	21.95

Source: Soccerway

=== Egyptian Premier League ===
==== League table ====
Pos	Team	Pld	W	D	L	GF	GA	GD	Pts	Qualification or relegation
12	El Gouna	34	9	12	13	32	44	−12	39	
13	National Bank of Egypt	34	9	9	16	46	45	+1	36	
14	Ismaily	34	7	12	15	33	43	−10	33 (Note: Tied on head-to-head points (3). Head-to-head goal difference: Ismaily +1, Pharco –1.)	
15	Pharco	34	6	15	13	32	43	−11	33	
16	Baladiyat El Mahalla (R)	34	7	7	20	31	65	−34	28	Relegation to Second Division A

Source: Soccerway
Rules for classification: 1) Points; 2) Head-to-head points; 3) Head-to-head goal difference; 4) Goal difference; 5) Goals scored; 6) Play-off tie.
(Note: Head-to-head records are used for final standings only)
(R) Relegated

==== Results summary ====
Overall								Home						Away					
Pld	W	D	L	GF	GA	GD	Pts	W	D	L	GF	GA	GD	W	D	L	GF	GA	GD
34	7	12	15	33	43	−10	33	5	5	7	19	21	−2	2	7	8	14	22	−8

Source: Worldfootball

==== Results by round ====
Round	1
Ground	A
Result	L
Position	12

Source: Worldfootball
A = Away; H = Home; W = Win; D = Draw; L = Loss; P = Postponed

==== Matches ====
The league fixtures were unveiled on 11 September 2023.

19 September 2023 1	ZED	1–0	Ismaily

28 September 2023 2	Ismaily	3–1	Al Ittihad

8 October 2023 3	Al Ahly	3–1	Ismaily

22 October 2023 4	Ismaily	0–1	Pharco

30 October 2023 5	El Dakhleya	0–0	Ismaily

5 November 2023 6	Ismaily	2–3	Tala'ea El Gaish

28 November 2023 7	Pyramids	2–1	Ismaily

5 December 2023 8	Ismaily	2–1	National Bank

16 December 2023 9	ENPPI	1–0	Ismaily

1 January 2024 11	Al Masry	1–1	Ismaily

15 February 2024 12	Ismaily	2–1	Ceramica Cleopatra

19 February 2024 13	Ismaily	0–0	Zamalek

26 February 2024 14	El Gouna	0–0	Ismaily

2 March 2024 15	Ismaily	0–1	Baladiyat El Mahalla

9 March 2024 16	Al Mokawloon Al Arab	1–1	Ismaily

3 April 2024 17	Ismaily	2–1	Smouha

14 April 2024 10	Ismaily	1–1	Modern Future

18 April 2024 18	Ismaily	1–2	ZED

22 April 2024 19	Al Ittihad	1–1	Ismaily

1 May 2024 20	Ismaily	1–2	Al Ahly

4 May 2024 21	Pharco	0–2	Ismaily

9 May 2024 22	Ismaily	1–0	El Dakhleya

14 May 2024 23	Tala'ea El Gaish	1–1	Ismaily

19 May 2024 24	Ismaily	0–2	Pyramids

26 May 2024 25	National Bank	2–2	Ismaily

17 June 2024 26	Ismaily	2–2	ENPPI

23 June 2024 27	Modern Future	0–1	Ismaily

27 June 2024 28	Ismaily	0–1	Al Masry

3 July 2024 29	Ceramica Cleopatra	1–0	Ismaily

7 July 2024 30	Zamalek	2–1	Ismaily

22 July 2024 31	Ismaily	1–1	El Gouna

30 July 2024 32	Baladiyat El Mahalla	4–2	Ismaily

13 August 2024 33	Ismaily	1–1	Al Mokawloon Al Arab

16 August 2024 34	Smouha	2–0	Ismaily

=== Egypt Cup ===
30 May 2024 Round of 32	Ismaily	2–1	El Qanah

21 August 2024 Round of 16	Ismaily	2–0	Smouha

24 August 2024 Quarter-finals	Tala'ea El Gaish	1–1 (9–10 p)	Ismaily

27 August 2024 Semi-finals	Ismaily	0–1	ZED

=== League Cup ===
==== Group stage ====
8 January 2024 1	El Dakhleya	1–0	Ismaily	Cairo
15:00	Omotosho 5'	Report		Stadium: Al Salam Stadium; Referee: Mostafa El Shohdy

17 January 2024 2	Ismaily	1–3	Ceramica Cleopatra	Ismailia
17:00	Annor 90+1'	Report	Rayyan 51'; Kendouci 60'; Belhadji 68' (pen.)	Stadium: Ismailia Stadium; Referee: Ibrahim Nour El Din

24 January 2024 3	ENPPI	1–0	Ismaily	Cairo
15:00	Fawzi 52'	Report		Stadium: Petrosport Stadium; Referee: Ahmed Hamdy
