= Omar El Saaiy =

Egyptian footballer (born 2003)

Personal information
- Full name: Omar Mamdouh Ibrahim Mohamed El Saaiy
- Date of birth: 1 January 2003 (age 23)
- Place of birth: Ismailia, Egypt
- Height: 1.82 m (6 ft 0 in)
- Position: Midfielder

Team information
- Current team: Al Ahly
- Number: 15

Youth career
- 2010–2013: Ismaily
- 2013–2016: Al Ahly
- 2016–2022: Ismaily

Senior career*
| Years | Team | Apps | (Gls) |
| 2022–2024 | Ismaily | 43 | (4) |
| 2024– | Al Ahly | 4 | (0) |
| 2025–2026 | → Al Masry (loan) | 21 | (6) |

International career^{‡}
| 2022–2023 | Egypt U20 | 5 | (0) |
| 2024 | Egypt U23 | 5 | (0) |
- * Club domestic league appearances and goals as of 23:14, 25 August 2026 (UTC) ‡ National team caps and goals as of 23:14, 23 March 2024 (UTC)

Omar Mamdouh Ibrahim Mohamed El Saaiy (Arabic: عمر الساعي; born 1 January 2003) is an Egyptian professional footballer who plays as a midfielder for the Egyptian Premier League club Al Ahly.

Omar used to play for Al Ismaily before joining Al Ahly in the 2024 summer transfers.

== Club career ==
=== Early career ===
El Saaiy began his football journey when he was seven years old at the Isamily Club, and after three years, he took a step that might have been a surprise to the Dervishes, by moving to the Al Ahly’s football school, where he also spent 3 years.

Omar has many pictures in the Al Ahly shirt, during his time in the Red Castle, before his return again to the ranks of the Dervishes in 2016.

El Saaiy confirmed in previous television statements on the On Time Sports channel that he had been a fan of the Ismaily club since his presence in the youth sector, and he was keen to go and support the Dervishes from the stands during the first team’s matches.

=== Isamily ===
El Saaiy played with Ismaily's junior and youth teams until 2022, during which he suffered a severe pelvic injury.

El Saaiy worked hard to return to participating again, and he actually recovered and started playing football normally.

After returning from injury, Ahmed Hossam “Mido” had taken over the training of the Ismailiy first team and asked to be promoted to the first team with more than one player, and El Saaiy was the one who caught Mido's attention the most.

Mido began following Eyad El Askalany more and asked the youth coaches about him, and he actually participated with him for the first time in the last match of the 2021/2022 season in the second half.

El Saaiy participated in the following season with Al-Ismaily, but at varying intervals under the leadership of Mido and Hamza El Gamal, and during the same period he played in the African Youth Cup of Nations, which was held in Egypt.

He did not score or assist during his first season with Ismaily, but his touches on the field were enough to make him appear as a player who could become exceptional one day.

The season that followed was Omar El Saaiy's real breakthrough under the leadership of Ehab Galal, whom he considers his spiritual father.

Ehab Galal was credited with developing his performance and developing his ability to play in more than one position in midfield instead of playing only as a playmaker, which is his main position.

In the 2023–24 season, El Saaiy participated in 33 matches in all tournaments, during which he scored four goals and made as many assists.

El Saaiy received an offer to play professionally at Red Bull Salzburg in Austria, but the negotiations were not formal and the deal was not completed in the end. Then he moved to Al Ahly for 50 million pounds.

=== Return to Al Ahly ===
Omar returned to Al Ahly as a professional player on 1 September 2024 coming from Ismaily his first ever club.

He made his debut with Al Ahly against Al Ain In FIFA Intercontinental Cup when Al Ahly won FIFA African–Asian–Pacific Cup by 3 goals scored by Wessam Abou Ali, Emam Ashour and Afsha.

On 26 November 2024, he made his CAF Champions League debut with Al Ahly against Stade d'Abidjan when Al Ahly won 4–2 which Mahmoud Kahraba scored 2 goals.

== Career statistics ==
=== Club ===
As of 10 August 2025

| Club | Season | League | | | Cup | | Continental | | Other | | Total | |
| Club | Season | Division | Apps | Goals | Apps | Goals | Apps | Goals | Apps | Goals | Apps | Goals |
|---|---|---|---|---|---|---|---|---|---|---|---|---|
| Ismaily | 2021–22 | EPL | 1 | 0 | 0 | 0 | — | | 0 | 0 | 1 | 0 |
| Ismaily | 2022–23 | EPL | 11 | 0 | 0 | 0 | — | | 0 | 0 | 11 | 0 |
| Ismaily | 2023–24 | EPL | 31 | 4 | 2 | 0 | — | | 0 | 0 | 33 | 4 |
| Ismaily | Total | | 43 | 4 | 2 | 0 | 0 | 0 | 0 | 0 | 45 | 4 |
| Al Ahly | 2024–25 | EPL | 4 | 0 | 0 | 0 | 3 (Note: Appearances in CAF Champions League) | 0 | 1 (Note: Appearances in FIFA Intercontinental Cup) | 0 | 8 | 0 |
| Al Masry (Loan) | 2025–26 | EPL | 1 | 1 | 0 | 0 | 0 | 0 | 0 | 0 | 1 | 1 |
| Al Masry (Loan) | Total | | 5 | 1 | 0 | 0 | 3 | 0 | 1 | 0 | 9 | 1 |
| Career Total | | | 48 | 5 | 2 | 0 | 3 | 0 | 1 | 0 | 54 | 5 |

=== International ===
As of 23 March 2024.

Appearances and goals by national team and year
| National team | Year | Apps | Goals |
|---|---|---|---|
| Egypt U20 | 2022 | 3 | 0 |
| Egypt U20 | 2023 | 2 | 0 |
| Egypt U23 | 2024 | 5 | 0 |
| Total | | 10 | 0 |

== Honours ==
Al Ahly

- Egyptian Super Cup: 2024
- FIFA African–Asian–Pacific Cup: 2024
