= 2024–25 Modern Sport FC season =

Modern Sport
2024–25 season
- Chairman: Walid Daabas
- Manager: Talaat Youssef (until 15 December); Franck Dumas (from 15 December)
- Stadium: Al Salam Stadium
- Egyptian Premier League: 18th
- Egypt Cup: Round of 16
- Egyptian League Cup: Group stage
- Top goalscorer: League: All: Ahmed Atef (2)
- All statistics correct as of 5 January 2025.

The 2024–25 season is the 14th season in Modern Sport FC's history and the fourth consecutive season in the Premier League. In addition to the domestic league, Modern Sport is set to compete in the domestic cup, and the Egyptian League Cup.

== Transfers ==
=== In ===
Date	Pos.	Player	From	Fee	Ref.
1 July 2024	FW	(Egypt) Diyaa El Sayed	(Egypt) El Mansoura		
1 July 2024	FW	(Zambia) Enock Sakala	(Zambia) ZESCO United		
18 July 2024	MF	(Egypt) Mohamed Mosaad	(Egypt) Suez SC		
24 July 2024	GK	(Egypt) Karim Emad	(Egypt) Haras El Hodoud		
1 August 2024	DF	(Egypt) Nader Hesham	(Egypt) Wadi Degla		
3 August 2024	MF	(Egypt) Mohamed Sabry	(Egypt) Proxy SC		
12 August 2024	DF	(Egypt) Tarek Mohamed	(Egypt) Sporting		
20 August 2024	FW	(Egypt) Omar El Said	(Egypt) Tala'ea El Gaish	Loan return	
20 August 2024	MF	(Egypt) Ahmed Mostafa	(Egypt) Smouha		
21 August 2024	GK	(Egypt) Mohamed Magdy	(Egypt) El Dakhleya		
21 August 2024	DF	(Egypt) Mohamed Desouki	(Egypt) Ismaily		
21 August 2024	MF	(Egypt) Abdelrahman Shika	(Egypt) El Entag El Harby		
6 September 2024	MF	(Burundi) Mohamed Amissi	(Egypt) Baladiyat El Mahalla		
6 September 2024	FW	(Nigeria) Fejiri Okenabirhie	(England) Cambridge United	Free	
8 September 2024	MF	(Egypt) Mostafa Hamada	(Egypt) Pharco	€75,000	
9 September 2024	MF	(Egypt) Abdallah Hafez	(Poland) Arka Gdynia	Free	
10 September 2024	MF	(Ghana) Frederick Kessie	(Ghana) Accra Lions		
25 October 2024	MF	(Nigeria) Ibraheem Ajasa			
24 January 2025	MF	(Tunisia) Mootez Zaddem	(Tunisia) Espérance de Tunis	Loan	

=== Out ===
Date	Pos.	Player	To	Fee	Ref.
8 September 2024	FW	(Egypt) Omar El Said		Contract terminated	
8 September 2024	MF	(Egypt) Mohamed Mahmoud		Contract terminated	
9 September 2024	MF	(Egypt) Mostafa Hamada	(Egypt) El Sekka El Hadid	Loan	
25 September 2024	FW	(Egypt) Marwan Mohsen	(Egypt) El Gouna	Contract terminated	
25 September 2024	MF	(Morocco) Abdelkabir El Ouadi	(Egypt) Smouha	Contract terminated	

== Friendlies ==
Modern Sport began its pre-season camp on 14 September.

22 October 2024 Friendly	Modern Sport (Egypt)	1–0	(Egypt) La Viena
	Eba

1 November 2024 Friendly	Modern Sport (Egypt)	2–1	(Egypt) Team FC
	El Sisi; Okenabirhie	Report

== Competitions ==
=== Overall record ===
Competition	First match	Last match	Starting round	Record							
Competition	First match	Last match	Starting round	Pld	W	D	L	GF	GA	GD	Win %
Egyptian Premier League	31 October 2024	30 May 2025	Matchday 1	8	0	4	4	2	10	−8	0.00
Egypt Cup	5 January 2025		Round of 32	1	1	0	0	5	2	+3	100.00
Egyptian League Cup	11 December 2024		Group stage	1	0	0	1	0	1	−1	0.00
Total				10	1	4	5	7	13	−6	10.00

Last updated: 12 January 2025
Source: Competitions

=== Egyptian Premier League ===
==== League table ====
Pos	Team	Pld	W	D	L	GF	GA	GD	Pts	Qualification or relegation
14	Ghazl El Mahalla	17	5	2	10	16	24	−8	17	Qualification for the relegation play-offs
15	El Gouna	17	4	5	8	10	15	−5	17	Qualification for the relegation play-offs
16	Ismaily	17	3	5	9	11	21	−10	14	Qualification for the relegation play-offs
17	ENPPI	17	2	6	9	10	21	−11	12	Qualification for the relegation play-offs
18	Modern Sport	17	1	6	10	9	24	−15	9	Qualification for the relegation play-offs

Source: Soccerway (regular season)
Rules for classification: 1) Points; 2) Goal difference; 3) Goals scored.

Pos	Team	Pld	W	D	L	GF	GA	GD	Pts	Qualification
1	Al Ahly (C)	8	6	1	1	22	9	+13	58 (Note: Al Ahly were initially deducted three points for refusing to play their away fixture against Zamalek, scheduled to be played on 11 March 2025. The points deduction was later cancelled by the Egyptian Premier League.)	Qualification for the Champions League first or second round
2	Pyramids	8	4	2	2	15	10	+5	56	Qualification for the Champions League first or second round
3	Zamalek	8	4	3	1	14	6	+8	47	Qualification for the Confederation Cup first or second round
4	Al Masry	8	3	3	2	10	9	+1	42	Qualification for the Confederation Cup first or second round
5	National Bank of Egypt SC	8	2	3	3	13	12	+1	38	
6	Ceramica Cleopatra	8	4	1	3	15	12	+3	37	
7	Pharco	8	2	3	3	8	16	−8	32	
8	Petrojet	8	1	2	5	7	17	−10	27	
9	Haras El Hodoud	8	0	2	6	3	16	−13	24	

Source: Soccerway (championship round)
Rules for classification: 1) Points; 2) Goal difference; 3) Goals scored; 4) Play-off tie.
(Note: Clubs qualified for this phase with the full regular season points they got, but without goals for or against)
(C) Champions
Notes:

Pos	Team	Pld	W	D	L	GF	GA	GD	Pts
3	Tala'ea El Gaish	8	1	5	2	5	6	−1	29
4	ENPPI	8	4	3	1	8	5	+3	27
5	Modern Sport	8	5	2	1	12	7	+5	26
6	Al Ittihad	8	1	5	2	3	5	−2	26
7	Smouha	8	0	5	3	2	6	−4	25

Source: Soccerway (relegation round)
Rules for classification: 1) Points; 2) Goal difference; 3) Goals scored; 4) Play-off tie.
(Note: Clubs qualified for this phase with the full regular season points they got, but without goals for or against)

==== Results summary ====
Overall								Home						Away					
Pld	W	D	L	GF	GA	GD	Pts	W	D	L	GF	GA	GD	W	D	L	GF	GA	GD
8	0	4	4	2	10	−8	4	0	2	2	0	4	−4	0	2	2	2	6	−4

Last updated: 12 January 2025.

==== Results by round ====
Round	1	2	3	4	5	6	7	8	9
Ground	H	A	H	A	H	A	H	A	H
Result	D	D	D	L	L	D	L	L	
Position	8	10	12	15	17				

Updated to match(es) played on 12 January 2025. Source:
A = Away; H = Home; W = Win; D = Draw; L = Loss

==== Matches ====
The league schedule was released on 19 October 2024.

31 October 2024 1	Modern Sport	0–0	ENPPI	Cairo
20:00 UTC+3	Ngwem (penalty missed) 90+8'			Stadium: Al Salam Stadium; Referee: Mustafa Al-Shahdi

8 November 2024 2	Petrojet	1–1	Modern Sport	Cairo
17:00 UTC+2	Mousa 57'		Zaazaa 48'	Stadium: Cairo Military Academy Stadium; Referee: Mahmoud Wafa

24 November 2024 3	Modern Sport	0–0	ZED	Cairo
20:00 UTC+2			Gamal (penalty missed) 45+3'	Stadium: Al Salam Stadium; Referee: Tarek Magdy

30 November 2024 4	Ceramica Cleopatra	4–1	Modern Sport	Cairo
17:00 UTC+2	Zalaka 3', 57', 81'; Issa 55'		Ngwem 62'	Stadium: Osman Ahmed Osman Stadium; Referee: Hamada Al Qalawi

20 December 2024 5	Modern Sport	0–1	National Bank	Cairo
17:00 UTC+2			Faisal 44' (pen.)	Stadium: Cairo International Stadium; Referee: Mohamed Maarouf

25 December 2024 6	Al Ittihad	0–0	Modern Sport	Alexandria
17:00 UTC+2				Stadium: Alexandria Stadium; Referee: Mohamed El Hanafi

1 January 2025 7	Modern Sport	0–3 (Note: Ismaily was awarded a win after Modern Sport exceeded the permitted limit of five foreign players by fielding six. The match had originally ended in a 0-0 draw.)	Ismaily	Cairo
17:00 UTC+2				Stadium: Cairo International Stadium; Referee: Amin Omar

12 January 2025 8	Smouha	1–0	Modern Sport	Alexandria
19:00 UTC+2	Hassan 43'			Stadium: Alexandria Stadium

23 January 2025 9	Modern Sport	v	Zamalek	Cairo
19:00 UTC+2

=== Egypt Cup ===
5 January 2025 Round of 32	Modern Sport	5–2 (a.e.t.)	El Shams	Cairo
14:30 UTC+2	Atef 31' (pen.), 105+1'; Desouky 41' (pen.); Gomma 98'; El Sayed 120+1'		Saad 4' (pen.); Ibrahim 13'	Stadium: Cairo International Stadium; Referee: Mohamed Youssef

7 March 2025 Round of 16	Modern Sport	v	Zamalek	Cairo
21:30 UTC+2				Stadium: Cairo International Stadium

=== Egyptian League Cup ===
==== Group stage ====
Pos	Team	Pld	W	D	L	GF	GA	GD	Pts	Qualification
1	Petrojet	4	4	0	0	6	2	+4	12	Advance to knockout stage
2	Modern Sport	4	1	2	1	2	1	+1	5	Advance to knockout stage
3	Zamalek	4	1	2	1	3	3	0	5	
4	El Gouna	4	1	2	1	2	2	0	5	
5	Smouha	4	0	0	4	1	6	−5	0	

Source: EPL
Rules for classification: Group stage tiebreakers

11 December 2024 1	Modern Sport	0–1	Petrojet	Cairo
20:00 UTC+2			Bamba 61'	Stadium: Petrosport Stadium; Referee: Ahmed Hamdy

23 March 2025 3	Modern Sport	v	Smouha	Cairo
				Stadium: Cairo International Stadium

2 April 2025 3	Zamalek	v	Modern Sport	Cairo
				Stadium: Cairo International Stadium

23 April 2025 4	El Gouna	v	Modern Sport	El Gouna
				Stadium: Khaled Bichara Stadium
