= 2024–25 Haras El Hodoud SC season =

Haras El Hodoud
2024–25 season
- Manager: Mohamed Youssef
- Stadium: Haras El Hodoud Stadium
- Egyptian Premier League: 11th
- Egypt Cup: Round of 32
- Egyptian League Cup: Group stage
- Biggest win: Haras El Hodoud 3–0 Tala'ea El Gaish
- All statistics correct as of 21 January 2025.

The 2024–25 season is the 75th season in Haras El Hodoud SC's history and the first season in the Premier League. In addition to the domestic league, Haras El Hodoud is set to compete in the domestic cup, and the Egyptian League Cup.

== Transfers ==
=== In ===
Date	Pos.	Player	From	Fee	Ref.
28 August 2024	MF	(Nigeria) Emeka Christian Eze	(Egypt) Al Masry	Free	
2 September 2024	MF	(Egypt) Fawzi El Henawy	(Egypt) Al Ittihad	Free	
19 September 2024	MF	(Egypt) Mohamed Ashraf Roqa	(Egypt) Zamalek	Free	
16 October 2024	FW	(Egypt) Hazem Mohamed	(Egypt) ZED	Loan	
20 October 2024	FW	(Ivory Coast) Mofossé Karidioula	(Ivory Coast) ASEC Mimosas	Free	
15 February 2025	FW	(Cameroon) Franck Mbella Etouga	(Egypt) Al Masry	Free	

=== Out ===
Date	Pos.	Player	To	Fee	Ref.
24 July 2024	GK	(Egypt) Karim Emad	(Egypt) Modern Sport		
1 October 2024	FW	(Egypt) Mostafa Sobhi	(Egypt) Al Mokawloon Al Arab	Undisclosed	
3 October 2024	MF	(Egypt) Ahmed Dawooda	(Egypt) Al Mokawloon Al Arab		

== Friendlies ==
11 October 2024 Friendly	Al Ahly (Egypt)	3–0	(Egypt) Haras El Hodoud	Cairo
	Afsha; Mohamed; El Shahat	Report		Stadium: Mokhtar El Tetsh Stadium

13 October 2024 Friendly	Haras El Hodoud (Egypt)	0–1	(Libya) Al-Ahly Benghazi

17 October 2024 Friendly	Haras El Hodoud (Egypt)	0–0	(Egypt) Al Ittihad	Alexandria
				Stadium: Haras El Hodoud Stadium

16 November 2024 Friendly	Petrojet (Egypt)	2–1	(Egypt) Haras El Hodoud
		Report

== Competitions ==
=== Overall record ===
Competition	First match	Last match	Starting round	Final position	Record							
Competition	First match	Last match	Starting round	Final position	Pld	W	D	L	GF	GA	GD	Win %
Egyptian Premier League	30 October 2024	30 May 2025	Matchday 1		9	2	3	4	9	11	−2	22.22
Egypt Cup	3 January 2025		Round of 32	Round of 32	1	0	0	1	0	1	−1	0.00
Egyptian League Cup	11 December 2024		Group stage		1	1	0	0	2	1	+1	100.00
Total					11	3	3	5	11	13	−2	27.27

Last updated: 21 January 2025
Source: Competitions

=== Egyptian Premier League ===
==== Regular season ====
Pos	Team	Pld	W	D	L	GF	GA	GD	Pts	Qualification or relegation
7	Pharco	17	6	5	6	17	19	−2	23	Qualification for the championship play-offs
8	Petrojet	17	5	7	5	17	18	−1	22	Qualification for the championship play-offs
9	Haras El Hodoud	17	6	4	7	17	19	−2	22	Qualification for the championship play-offs
10	Tala'ea El Gaish	17	5	6	6	13	18	−5	21	Qualification for the relegation play-offs
11	ZED	17	4	9	4	15	13	+2	21	Qualification for the relegation play-offs

Source: Soccerway (regular season)
Rules for classification: 1) Points; 2) Goal difference; 3) Goals scored.

===== Results summary =====
Overall								Home						Away					
Pld	W	D	L	GF	GA	GD	Pts	W	D	L	GF	GA	GD	W	D	L	GF	GA	GD
9	2	3	4	9	11	−2	9	1	2	1	4	3	+1	1	1	3	5	8	−3

Last updated: 21 January 2025.

===== Results by round =====
Round	1	2	3	4	5	6	7	8	9
Ground	H	A	H	A	H	A	H	A	A
Result	L	L	D	L	D	D	W	L	W
Position	16	18	18	18	18	18	14		

Updated to match(es) played on 21 January 2025. Source:
A = Away; H = Home; W = Win; D = Draw; L = Loss

===== Matches =====
The league schedule was released on 19 October 2024.

30 October 2024 1	Haras El Hodoud	1–3	Smouha	Alexandria
17:00 UTC+3	Roqa 45+1' (pen.)		Saber 34'; El Ouadi 45+4'; Hassan 46'	Stadium: Haras El Hodoud Stadium; Referee: Hamada Al-Qalawi

7 November 2024 2	Al Ittihad	1–0	Haras El Hodoud	Alexandria
17:00 UTC+2	Farid 51'			Stadium: Alexandria Stadium; Referee: Mohamed El Hanafy

24 November 2024 3	Haras El Hodoud	0–0	Ceramica Cleopatra	Alexandria
20:00 UTC+2				Stadium: Haras El Hodoud Stadium; Referee: Mahmoud Nasef

30 November 2024 4	ZED	2–0	Haras El Hodoud	Cairo
17:00 UTC+2	El Banouby 18'; Ziko 42'			Stadium: Al Salam Stadium; Referee: Mostafa Osman

19 December 2024 5	Haras El Hodoud	0–0	Al Masry	Suez
17:00 UTC+2				Stadium: Suez Stadium; Referee: Ibrahim Mohamed

25 December 2024 6	Ismaily	2–2	Haras El Hodoud	Ismailia
17:00 UTC+2	El Malawany 53'; Hamdi 64' (pen.)		Mamdouh 25'; Bayoumi 47' (o.g.)	Stadium: Ismailia Stadium; Referee: Hamada Al Qalawi

29 December 2024 7	Haras El Hodoud	3–0	Tala'ea El Gaish	Alexandria
17:00 UTC+2	Mohamed 23'; Karidioula 57'; Gouda 82'		Mao (red card) 90+5'	Stadium: Haras El Hodoud Stadium; Referee: Walid Abdelrazak

16 January 2025 8	Zamalek	3–2	Haras El Hodoud	Cairo
16:00 UTC+2	Zizo 12', 45+6' (pen.); Shalaby 36'		Roqa 25' (pen.); Mamdouh 86' (pen.)	Stadium: Cairo International Stadium; Referee: Hamada Al Qalawi

21 January 2025 9	Ghazl El Mahalla	0–1	Haras El Hodoud	El Mahalla El Kubra
16:00 UTC+2				Stadium: Ghazl El Mahalla Stadium; Referee: Atef Hussein

==== Championship Round ====
Pos	Team	Pld	W	D	L	GF	GA	GD	Pts
5	National Bank of Egypt	1	0	0	1	1	2	−1	29
6	Ceramica Cleopatra	1	1	0	0	2	0	+2	27
7	Pharco	2	1	0	1	2	3	−1	26
8	Petrojet	2	1	0	1	2	5	−3	25
9	Haras El Hodoud	2	0	0	2	1	4	−3	22

Updated to match(es) played on 12 April 2025. Source: Soccerway (championship round)
Rules for classification: 1) Points; 2) Goal difference; 3) Goals scored; 4) Play-off tie.
(Note: Clubs qualified for this phase with the full regular season points they got, but without goals for or against)

===== Results Summary =====
Overall								Home						Away					
Pld	W	D	L	GF	GA	GD	Pts	W	D	L	GF	GA	GD	W	D	L	GF	GA	GD
2	0	0	2	1	4	−3	0	0	0	2	1	4	−3	0	0	0	0	0	0

Last updated: 16 April 2025.

===== Matches =====
11 March 2025 1	Haras El Hodoud	1–2	Petrojet	Alexandria
21:30 UTC+2				Stadium: Borg El Arab Stadium

13 April 2025 2	Haras El Hodoud	0–2	Zamalek	Alexandria
19:00 UTC+2		Report	El Said 45' (pen.); Mansi 89'	Stadium: Borg El Arab Stadium

=== Egypt Cup ===
3 January 2025 Round of 32	ENPPI	1–0	Haras El Hodoud	Cairo
17:30 UTC+2	Hawash 48'			Stadium: Petrosport Stadium; Referee: Mohamed Abbas Qabil

=== Egyptian League Cup ===
==== Group stage ====
Pos	Team	Pld	W	D	L	GF	GA	GD	Pts	Qualification
1	Haras El Hodoud	3	3	0	0	5	1	+4	9	Advance to knockout stage
2	Ismaily	3	1	1	1	5	4	+1	4	Advance to knockout stage
3	Pyramids	3	1	1	1	4	4	0	4	
4	Al Ittihad	3	0	0	3	0	5	−5	0	

Source: EPL
Rules for classification: Group stage tiebreakers

11 December 2024 1	Haras El Hodoud	2–1	Ismaily	Alexandria
17:00 UTC+2	Gouda 21'; Abdelhakim 34'		Hamdi 11'	Stadium: Borg El Arab Stadium; Referee: Mohamed Al Ghazi

22 March 2025 2	Al Ittihad	0–1	Haras El Hodoud	Alexandria
				Stadium: Alexandria Stadium

16 April 2025 3	Haras El Hodoud	2–0	Pyramids	Alexandria
	Ouka 45+2'; Etouga 77'			Stadium: Haras El Hodoud Stadium

==== Quarter-finals ====
22 April 2025 First leg	ENPPI	2–0	Haras El Hodoud
19:00

21 May 2025 Second leg	Haras El Hodoud	v	ENPPI
20:00
