= 2022 Egyptian League Cup =

First edition of the EFA Cup

2022 كأس الرابطة المصرية

Tournament details
- Dates: 13 January 2022 – 7 July 2022
- Teams: 18

Final positions
- Champions: Future (1st title)
- Runners-up: Ghazl El Mahalla
- Third place: Ismaily
- Fourth place: ENPPI

2022 Egyptian League Cup was the first edition of the Egyptian League Cup, an annual knockout football competition for Egyptian Premier League clubs.

== Group stage ==
Pos	Team	Pld	W	D	L	GF	GA	GD	Pts	Qualification or relegation
1	Future	5	4	0	1	9	4	+5	12	Advanced to Semifinals
2	Al Ittihad	5	3	2	0	7	4	+3	11	
3	Misr Lel Makkasa	5	2	1	2	5	4	+1	7	
4	Pyramids	5	1	1	3	5	6	−1	4	
5	Al Masry	5	1	1	3	5	9	−4	4	
6	Eastern Company	5	1	1	3	4	8	−4	4	

Updated to match(es) played on unknown. Source: Soccerway
Rules for classification: 1) Points; 2) Head-to-Head points; 3) Head-to-Head goal difference; 4) Head-to-Head goals scored; 5) Head-to-Head away goals scored; 6) Goal difference; 7) Goals scored.
(Note: Head-to-head record is used only after all the matches between the teams in question have been played).

Pos	Team	Pld	W	D	L	GF	GA	GD	Pts	Qualification or relegation
1	Ismaily	5	2	3	0	7	3	+4	9	Advanced to Semifinals
2	Al Mokawloon Al Arab	5	2	2	1	4	3	+1	8	
3	Smouha	5	2	1	2	6	4	+2	7	
4	El Gouna	5	1	2	2	4	7	−3	5	
5	National Bank of Egypt	5	0	4	1	3	4	−1	4	
6	Al Ahly	5	0	4	1	3	6	−3	4	

Updated to match(es) played on unknown. Source: Soccerway
Rules for classification: 1) Points; 2) Head-to-Head points; 3) Head-to-Head goal difference; 4) Head-to-Head goals scored; 5) Head-to-Head away goals scored; 6) Goal difference; 7) Goals scored.
(Note: Head-to-head record is used only after all the matches between the teams in question have been played).

Pos	Team	Pld	W	D	L	GF	GA	GD	Pts	Qualification or relegation
1	Ghazl El Mahalla	5	3	2	0	9	3	+6	11	Advanced to Semifinals
2	ENPPI	5	3	2	0	5	1	+4	11	Advanced to Semifinals
3	Tala'ea El Gaish	5	1	3	1	2	2	0	6	
4	Ceramica Cleopatra	5	1	1	3	7	9	−2	4	
5	Pharco	5	1	1	3	5	9	−4	4	
6	Zamalek	5	1	1	3	3	7	−4	4	

Updated to match(es) played on unknown. Source: Soccerway
Rules for classification: 1) Points; 2) Head-to-Head points; 3) Head-to-Head goal difference; 4) Head-to-Head goals scored; 5) Head-to-Head away goals scored; 6) Goal difference; 7) Goals scored.
(Note: Head-to-head record is used only after all the matches between the teams in question have been played).

== Knockout stage ==
All times are local

=== Semifinals ===
3 July 2022
18:00

Ismaily	2–2	Ghazl El Mahalla
Wahesh 80' (pen.); Nabris 96'	Report	4' (pen.) El Henawy; 118' Mao
Penalties
Magdy (penalty missed); Ayman (penalty missed); Adel (penalty scored); Mostafa (penalty scored); Nabris (penalty scored)	3–4	(penalty scored) El Henawy; (penalty scored) Mao; (penalty missed) Sami; (penalty scored) El Akhmimi; (penalty scored) El Sheikh

Arab Contractors Stadium, Cairo

3 July 2022
21:30

Future	2–0	ENPPI
Atef 45+1'; Farouk 48'	Report

Cairo International Stadium, Cairo

=== Third place play-off ===
7 July 2022
18:00

Ismaily	1–1	ENPPI
El Halwani 4' (pen.)	Report	90+3' (pen.) Fawzy
Penalties
El Halwani (penalty scored); Madbouly (penalty scored); Makhlouf (penalty scored); Morsi (penalty scored); Yassin (penalty scored)	5–4	(penalty scored) Ismail; (penalty scored) Youssef; (penalty missed) El Kadi; (penalty scored) Al-Nahhas; (penalty scored) Fawzy

Cairo International Stadium, Cairo

=== Final ===
7 July 2022
21:30

Ghazl El Mahalla	1–5	Future
Hamed 90'	Report	33' Walid 40' Samir 60' Atef 65' Farouk 79' Mohsen

Cairo International Stadium, Cairo
