= Clinton Duodu =

Ghanaian professional footballer

Personal information
- Date of birth: 20 June 2005 (age 21)
- Place of birth: Bechem, Ghana
- Height: 1.80 m (5 ft 11 in)
- Position: Forward

Team information
- Current team: Sivasspor (on loan from Apollon Limassol)
- Number: 17

Senior career*
Years	Team	Apps	(Gls)
2020–2024	Bechem United	96	(7)
2024–	Apollon Limassol	39	(3)
2026–	→ Sivasspor (loan)	6	(0)
- * Club domestic league appearances and goals as of 7 November 2026

Clinton Duodu (born 20 June 2005) is a Ghanaian professional footballer who plays as forward for Turkish TFF 1. Lig club Sivasspor on loan from Cypriot First Division club Apollon Limassol.

== Career ==
=== Bechem United ===
Duodu started his professional career with Bechem United and was promoted to the senior team in August 2020 ahead of the 2020–21 season. On 11 November 2020, during the first match of the season he was named on the bench for the match against Liberty Professionals. He however made his debut the following week at the age of 15 years, during match day 2 after coming on in the 62nd minute for Emmanuel Boakye Owusu in a 1–0 victory West African Football Academy (WAFA). He made his first full debut on 18 December 2020 against Karela United, and created the assist to Steven Owusu's goal in the 46th minute. The match subsequently ended in a 2–1 victory for Bechem. On 7 February 2021, he scored his debut goal after converting a penalty in the 13th minute in 3–1 victory over Accra Great Olympics.

In May 2022, Duodu was linked with a move to Portuguese Primeira Liga club Sporting CP.

In September 2022, Duodu was named by English newspaper The Guardian as one of the best players born in 2005 worldwide.

=== Apollon Limassol ===
On 6 September 2024, Duodu joined Cypriot First Division club Apollon Limassol on a three-year contract.
