= Mootez Zaddem =

Tunisian footballer

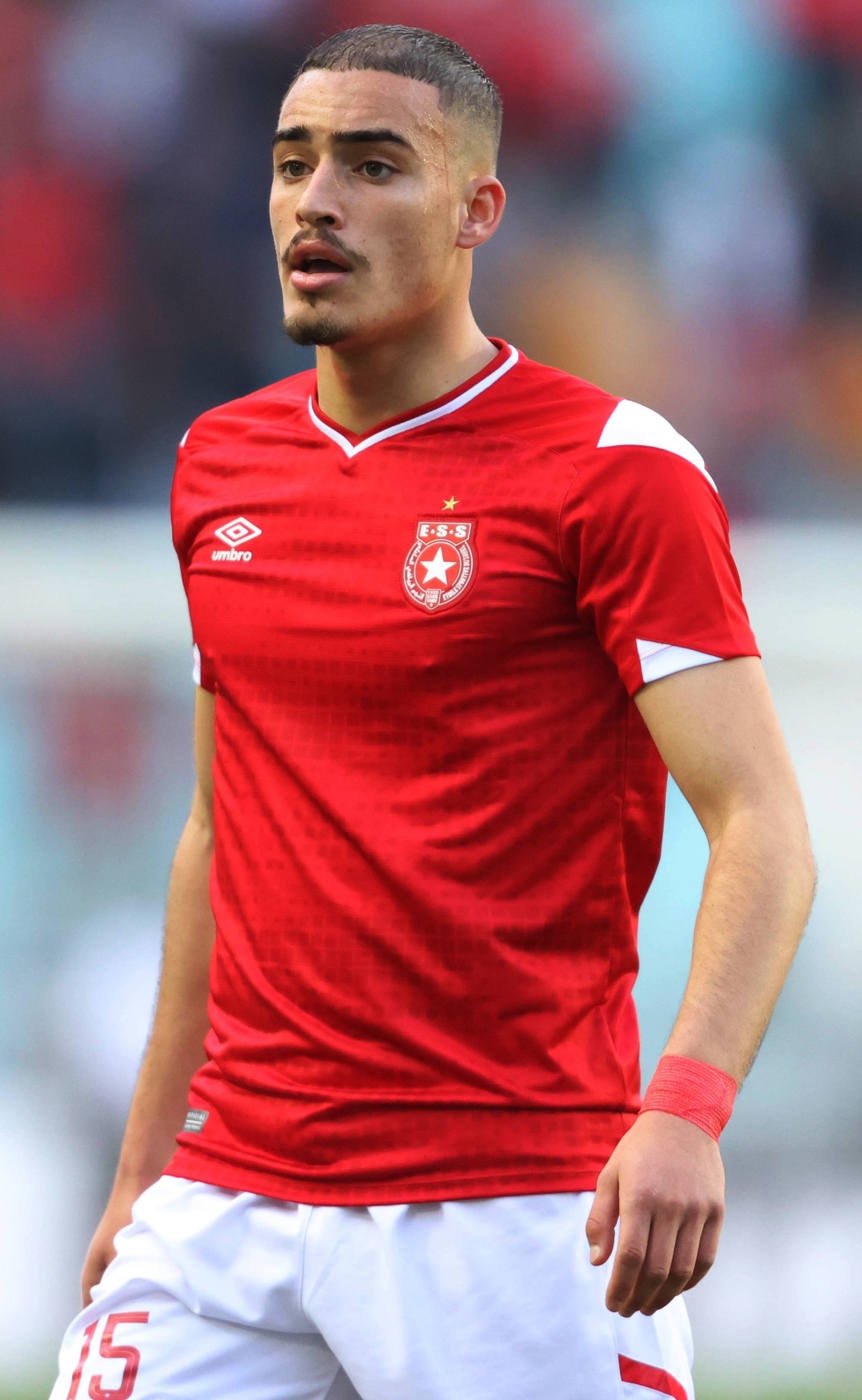
- Zaddem with Étoile du Sahel in 2022

Personal information
- Full name: Mootez Zaddem
- Date of birth: 5 January 2001 (age 25)
- Place of birth: Sousse, Tunisia
- Height: 1.76 m (5 ft 9 in)
- Position: Midfielder

Team information
- Current team: Club Africain
- Number: 20

Senior career*
Years	Team	Apps	(Gls)
2020–2022	Valmiera	23	(0)
2021–2022	→ Étoile du Sahel (loan)	21	(0)
2022–2025	Espérance de Tunis	24	(2)
2024	→ Al Masry (loan)	21	(5)
2025	→ Modern Sport (loan)	13	(0)
2025–2026	Erbil	12	(1)
2026	Al-Shorta	21	(2)
2026-	Club Africain	2	(1)

International career^{‡}
2020–2021	Tunisia U20	12	(0)
2021–	Tunisia	3	(0)
Medal record
Representing Tunisia
Men's football
FIFA Arab Cup
Runner-up	2021 Qatar
- * Club domestic league appearances and goals as of 2 June 2026 ‡ National team caps and goals as of 26 March 2024

Mootez Zaddem (Arabic: معتز الزدام; born 5 January 2001 in Sousse) is a Tunisian professional footballer who plays as a midfielder for Club Africain and the Tunisia national team.

== Club career ==
On 10 September 2021, Zaddem moved to Étoile du Sahel on a one-year loan from Valmeria.

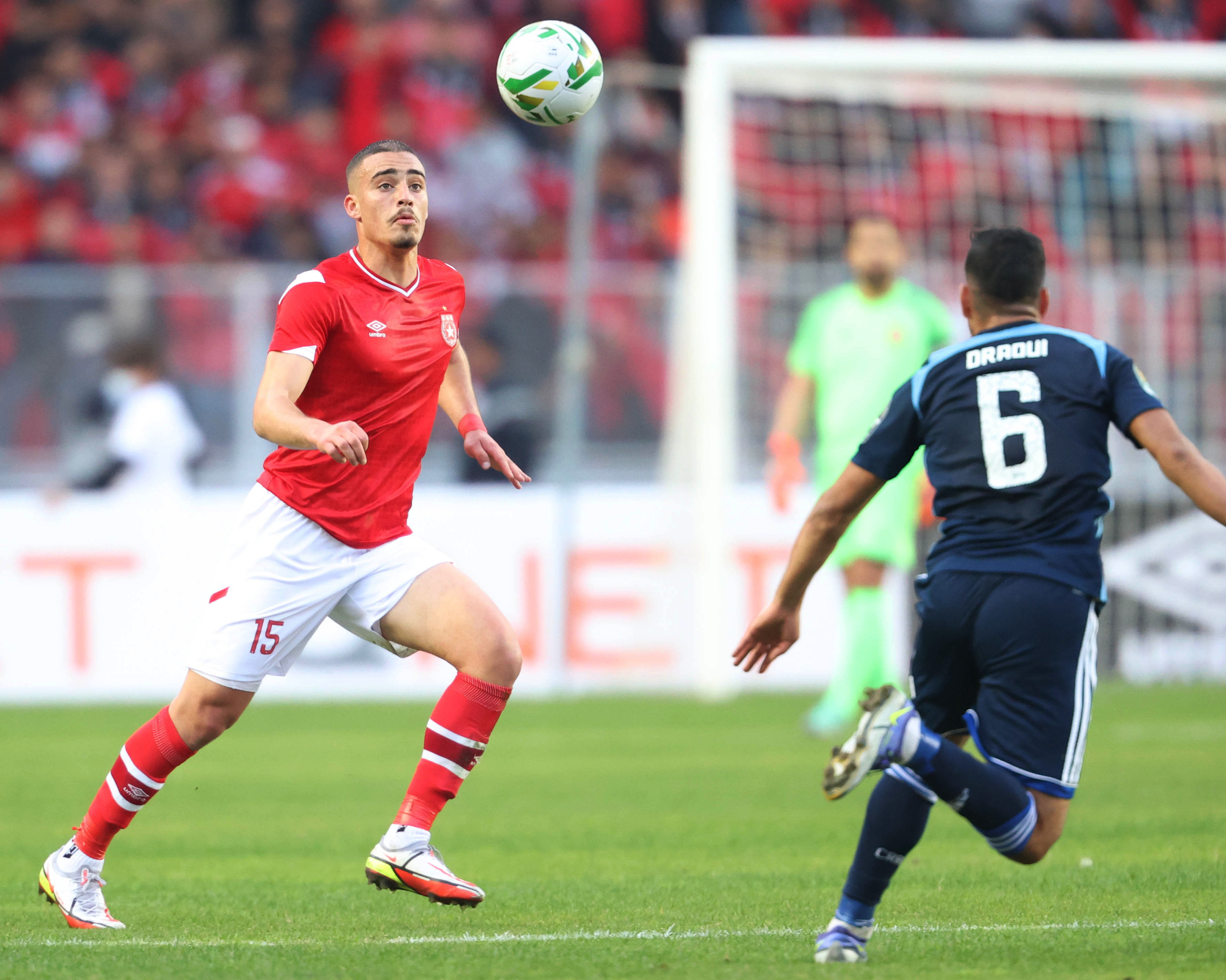
Zaddem in action in a CAF Champions League match for Étoile du Sahel

== International career ==
With the under 20s, he participated in the Africa U-20 Cup of Nations in 2021. During this competition held in Mauritania, he played six games. Tunisia ranked fourth in the tournament, losing to the Gambia in the match for third place.

Zaddem made his international debut for Tunisia on 3 December 2021, coming off the bench in the 86th minute against the Syria national football team. He was part of the squad that were runners-up in the 2021 FIFA Arab Cup.

== Career statistics ==
=== Club ===
As of 17 January 2026

Appearances and goals by club, season and competition
Club	Season	League			Cup (Note: Includes Latvian Football Cup, Tunisian Cup, Egyptian Cup and Iraq FA Cup)		League cup (Note: Includes Egyptian League Cup)		Continental		Other		Total	
Club	Season	Division	Apps	Goals	Apps	Goals	Apps	Goals	Apps	Goals	Apps	Goals	Apps	Goals
Valmiera	2020	Latvian League	18	0	1	0	—		1 (Note: Appearance in UEFA Europa League)	0	—		20	0
Valmiera	2021	Latvian League	5	0	0	0	—		2 (Note: Appearances in UEFA Conference League)	0	—		7	0
Valmiera	Total		23	0	1	0	—		3	0	—		27	0
Étoile du Sahel (loan)	2021–22	Tunisian Ligue 1	21	0	1	0	—		6 (Note: Appearances in CAF Champions League)	0	—		28	0
Espérance de Tunis	2022–23	Tunisian Ligue 1	17	1	4	1	—		9	0	—		30	2
Espérance de Tunis	2023–24	Tunisian Ligue 1	4	1	—		—		2 (Note: One appearance in CAF Champions League, one appearance in African Football League)	0	2 (Note: Appearances in Arab Club Champions Cup)	0	8	1
Espérance de Tunis	2024–25	Tunisian Ligue 1	2	0	—		—		—		—		2	0
Espérance de Tunis	Total		23	2	4	1	—		11	0	2	0	40	3
Al Masry (loan)	2023–24	Egyptian League	21	5	0	0	1	0	—		—		22	5
Modern Sport (loan)	2024–25	Egyptian League	13	0	1	1	0	0	—		—		14	1
Erbil	2025–26	Iraq Stars League	12	1	1	0	—		—		—		13	1
Career total			113	8	8	2	1	0	20	0	2	0	144	10

=== International ===
As of 26 March 2024

Appearances and goals by national team and year
National team	Year	Apps	Goals
Tunisia U20	2020	4	0
Tunisia U20	2021	8	0
Tunisia U20	Total	12	0
Tunisia	2021	2	0
Tunisia	2024	1	0
Tunisia	Total	3	0
Career total		15	0

== Honours ==
Tunisia

- Kirin Cup Soccer: 2022
