= 2025–26 Al Masry SC season =

Al Masry SC
2025–26 season
- Manager: Nabil Kouki (until 7 April); Emad El Nahhas (from 7 April)
- Premier League Regular season: 5th
- Premier League Championship round: 5th
- Egypt Cup: Round of 16
- Egyptian League Cup: Semi-finals
- CAF Confederation Cup: Quarter-finals
- Top goalscorer: Salah Mohsen (7)
- Biggest win: Al Masry 4–0 Kahrabaa Ismailia
- Biggest defeat: Zamalek 3–0 Al Masry; Al Masry 1–4 Zamalek

The 2026 season is the 106th season in the history of Al Masry Sporting Club, with the club participating in the Egyptian Premier League, the Egypt Cup, and the Egyptian Professional Clubs League Cup, in addition to its second consecutive appearance in the CAF Confederation Cup.

== Transfers ==
=== In ===
Pos.	Player	Transferred from	Fee	Date	Source
MF	(Egypt) Omar El Saaiy	(Egypt) Al Ahly	Loan	2 July 2025	
FW	(Algeria) Mounder Temine	(Algeria) CS Constantine	€200,000	2 July 2025	
MF	(Rwanda) Bonheur Mugisha	(Tunisia) Stade Tunisien	€300,000	5 August 2025	
FW	(Nigeria) Kingsley Eduwo	(Algeria) ES Sétif	Free	8 September 2025	
MF	(Morocco) Oussama Zemraoui	(Morocco) Wydad Casablanca	Loan	12 January 2026	
MF	(Palestine) Ameed Sawafta	Al-Salt SC		13 January 2026	
DF	(Egypt) Mostafa El Aash	(Egypt) Al Ahly	Loan	15 January 2026	
MF	(Palestine) Moustafa Zeidan	(Sweden) Malmö FF	Free	30 January 2026	

== Pre-season and friendlies ==
20 July 2025	CS Sfaxien (Tunisia)	1–1	(Egypt) Al Masry	Sfax, Tunisia
17:00 UTC+1	Mutyaba		Amr El Saadawy (pen.)	Stadium: Taieb Mhiri Stadium

23 July 2025	Étoile Sportive du Sahel (Tunisia)	1–1	(Egypt) Al Masry	Sfax, Tunisia
				Stadium: Taieb Mhiri Stadium

27 July 2025	Espérance Sportive de Tunis (Tunisia)	0–1	(Egypt) Al Masry	Tunis, Tunisia
			Mohsen 53'	Stadium: Hassen Belkhodja Complex

== Competitions ==
=== Overall record ===
Competition	First match	Last match	Starting round	Final position	Record							
Competition	First match	Last match	Starting round	Final position	Pld	W	D	L	GF	GA	GD	Win %
Premier League Regular season	8 August 2025	10 March 2026	Matchday 1	5th	20	8	8	4	29	20	+9	40.00
Premier League Championship round	5 April 2026	20 May 2026	Matchday 1		5	2	2	1	6	7	−1	40.00
Egypt Cup	22 December 2025	21 January 2026	Round of 32	Round of 16	2	1	1	0	4	2	+2	50.00
Egyptian League Cup	11 December 2025				8	4	3	1	9	5	+4	50.00
CAF Confederation Cup	17 October 2025	21 March 2026	Second preliminary round	Quarter-finals	10	4	4	2	12	9	+3	40.00
Total					45	19	18	8	60	43	+17	42.22

Source: Competitions

=== Egyptian Premier League ===
==== Regular season ====
Pos	Team	Pld	W	D	L	GF	GA	GD	Pts	Qualification
3	Al Ahly	20	11	7	2	33	19	+14	40	Qualification for the championship play-offs
4	Ceramica Cleopatra	20	11	5	4	29	16	+13	38	Qualification for the championship play-offs
5	Al Masry	20	8	8	4	29	20	+9	32	Qualification for the championship play-offs
6	Smouha	20	8	7	5	21	13	+8	31	Qualification for the championship play-offs
7	ENPPI	20	7	9	4	20	16	+4	30	Qualification for the championship play-offs

Source: Soccerway (regular season)
Rules for classification: 1) Points; 2) Goal difference; 3) Goals scored.

Overall								Home						Away					
Pld	W	D	L	GF	GA	GD	Pts	W	D	L	GF	GA	GD	W	D	L	GF	GA	GD
20	8	8	4	29	20	+9	32	6	3	1	20	10	+10	2	5	3	9	10	−1

Round	1	2	3	4	5	6	7	8	9	10	11	12	13	14	15	16	17	18	19	20	21
Ground	H	A	H	A	H	A	H	A	H	A	H		A	H	A	H	A	A	H	A	H
Result	W	W	D	D	W	L	W	D	L	W	D	B	D	D	L	W	D	D	W	L	W
Position	1	1	1	2	1	2	2	2	3	2	4	4	5	5	8	6	6	7	5	5	5

A = Away; H = Home; W = Win; D = Draw; L = Loss

===== Matches =====
8 August 2025 1	Al Masry	3–1	Al Ittihad

14 August 2025 2	Tala'ea El Gaish	0–3	Al Masry

19 August 2025 3	Al Masry	2–2	Pyramids

26 August 2025 4	Haras El Hodoud	1–1	Al Masry

31 August 2025 5	Al Masry	4–0	Kahrabaa Ismailia

13 September 2025 6	Zamalek	3–0	Al Masry

17 September 2025 7	Al Masry	2–1	Ghazl El Mahalla

22 September 2025 8	Pharco	1–1	Al Masry

27 September 2025 9	Al Masry	2–3	Petrojet

3 October 2025 10	National Bank	0–1	Al Masry

22 October 2025 11	Al Masry	0–0	Smouha

12	Bye

2 November 2025 13	Al Ahly	0–0	Al Masry

28 January 2026 16	Al Masry	3–2	Ceramica Cleopatra

4 February 2026 17	ZED	1–1	Al Masry

11 February 2026 14	Al Masry	1–1	Wadi Degla

19 February 2026 18	Al Mokawloon Al Arab	1–1	Al Masry

25 February 2026 19	Al Masry	1–0	Modern Sport

1 March 2026 20	ENPPI	3–2	Al Masry

6 March 2026 21	Al Masry	2–0	Ismaily

10 March 2026 15	El Gouna	1–0	Al Masry

==== Championship round ====
Pos	Team	Pld	W	D	L	GF	GA	GD	Pts	Qualification
3	Al Ahly	6	4	1	1	11	5	+6	53	Qualification for the Confederation Cup first or second round
4	Ceramica Cleopatra	6	1	3	2	5	5	0	44	
5	Al Masry	6	2	2	2	6	9	−3	40	
6	ENPPI	6	1	3	2	7	9	−2	36	
7	Smouha	6	0	0	6	2	10	−8	31	

Updated to match(es) played on 20 May 2026. Source: Soccerway (championship round)
Rules for classification: 1) Points; 2) Head to Head; 3) Goals scored; 4) Play-off tie.
(Note: Clubs qualified for this phase with the full regular season points they got, but without goals for or against)

Overall								Home						Away					
Pld	W	D	L	GF	GA	GD	Pts	W	D	L	GF	GA	GD	W	D	L	GF	GA	GD
5	2	2	1	6	7	−1	8	0	1	1	3	6	−3	2	1	0	3	1	+2

Round	1	2	3	4	5
Ground	H	A	H	A	A
Result	L	D	D	W	W
Position					

A = Away; H = Home; W = Win; D = Draw; L = Loss

5 April 2026 1	Al Masry	1–4	Zamalek	Alexandria

11 April 2026 2	Pyramids	1–1	Al Masry

22 April 2026 3	Al Masry	2–2	ENPPI

27 April 2026 4	Smouha	0–1	Al Masry

1 May 2026 5	Ceramica Cleopatra	0–1	Al Masry

6	Bye

20 May 2026 7	Al Masry	v	Al Ahly	Alexandria
20:00				Stadium: Borg El Arab Stadium; Referee: Amin Omar

=== Egypt Cup ===
22 December 2025 Round of 32	Al Masry	4–2	Dekernes	Suez
	Bambo 18' (pen.), 68' (pen.); Temine 37'; El Saaiy 48' (pen.)		Safwat 23'; Morsi 59'	Stadium: Suez Stadium

21 January 2026 Round of 16	ZED	0–0 (a.e.t.) (5–4 p)	Al Masry	Suez
14:30				Stadium: Suez Stadium
	Penalties
	Saber (penalty scored); Bakri (penalty scored); El-Saghiri (penalty scored); Gamal (penalty scored); Saad (penalty scored)		(penalty scored) Mugisha; (penalty scored) Bambo; (penalty scored) El Saaiy; (penalty scored) Ali; (penalty missed) Zemraoui

=== Egyptian League Cup ===
==== Group stage ====
Group C

Pos	Team	Pld	W	D	L	GF	GA	GD	Pts	Qualification
1	Al Masry	6	3	2	1	5	3	+2	11	Advance to the quarter-finals
2	ZED	6	3	1	2	6	4	+2	10	Advance to the quarter-finals
3	Al Ittihad	6	1	5	0	5	2	+3	8	
4	Kahrabaa Ismailia	6	1	5	0	12	11	+1	8	
5	Smouha	6	2	2	2	4	5	−1	8	

Source: EFL
Rules for classification: Group stage tiebreakers

11 December 2025 1	Al Ittihad	0–0	Al Masry

19 December 2025 2	Al Masry	1–0	ZED

25 December 2025 3	Haras El Hodoud	0–1	Al Masry

4	Bye

5 January 2026 5	Al Masry	2–0	Smouha

10 January 2026 6	Kahrabaa Ismailia	1–1	Al Masry

15 January 2026 7	Al Masry	0–2	Zamalek

==== Knock-out stage ====
26 March 2026 Quarter-finals; First leg	El Gouna	0–2	Al Masry

30 March 2026 Quarter-finals; Second leg	Al Masry	2–2 (4–2 agg.)	El Gouna

25 May 2026 Semi-finals; First leg	ZED	v	Al Masry
20:00

1 June 2026 Semi-finals; Second leg	Al Masry	v	ZED
17:00

=== CAF Confederation Cup ===
==== Second preliminary round ====
17 October 2025 First leg	Al-Ittihad (Libya)	0–0	(Egypt) Al Masry	Tripoli, Libya
				Stadium: Tripoli International Stadium

26 October 2025 Second leg	Al Masry (Egypt)	2–1 (2–1 agg.)	(Libya) Al-Ittihad	Suez
21:00				Stadium: Suez Stadium; Referee: Masixole Bambiso (South Africa)

==== Group stage ====
Group D

Pos	Team	Pld	W	D	L	GF	GA	GD	Pts	Qualification
1	(Egypt) Zamalek	6	3	2	1	6	4	+2	11	Advance to knockout stage
2	(Egypt) Al Masry	6	3	1	2	9	7	+2	10 (Note: Ranked on goal difference in all group matches: Al Masry +2, Kaizer Chiefs +1.)	Advance to knockout stage
3	(South Africa) Kaizer Chiefs	6	3	1	2	7	6	+1	10	
4	(Zambia) ZESCO United	6	1	0	5	3	8	−5	3	

Source: CAF
Notes:

Round	1	2	3	4	5	6
Ground	H	A	A	H	A	H
Result	W	W	D	L	L	W
Position	-	-	-	-	-	2

A = Away; H = Home; W = Win; D = Draw; L = Loss

23 November 2025 1	Al Masry (Egypt)	2–1	(South Africa) Kaizer Chiefs

28 November 2025 2	ZESCO United (Zambia)	2–3	(Egypt) Al Masry

25 January 2026 3	Zamalek (Egypt)	0–0	(Egypt) Al Masry	Alexandria

1 February 2026 4	Al Masry (Egypt)	1–2	(Egypt) Zamalek	Alexandria

8 February 2026 5	Kaizer Chiefs (South Africa)	2–1	(Egypt) Al Masry

14 February 2026 6	Al Masry (Egypt)	2–0	(Zambia) ZESCO United

==== Knock-out stage ====
===== Quarter-finals =====
14 March 2026 First leg	Al Masry (Egypt)	1–1	(Algeria) CR Belouizdad

21 March 2026 Second leg	CR Belouizdad (Algeria)	0–0 (1–1 agg.)	(Egypt) Al Masry	Algeria
