= Listowel Amankona =

Ghanaian footballer (born 2005)

Listowel Amankona (born 4 April 2005) is a Ghanaian professional footballer who plays as midfielder

== Career ==
Amankona started his career with Bechem United and he was moved to the senior team in September 2020, ahead of the 2020–21 season. He made his debut in a league match against Karela United on 18 December 2020, coming on in the 87th minute for Steven Owusu and scoring a 90th-minute goal to help Bechem seal 2–1 victory. On 29 January 2021, he scored his second goal after coming on in the 49th minute to score a late goal in the 89th minute from an assist from Francis Twene to help Bechem United to a 3–1 victory over Techiman Eleven Wonders to end their four-match winless run.
