= Mohamed Hassan (footballer, born 1993) =

Egyptian footballer (born 1993)

Personal information
- Full name: Mohamed Hassan
- Date of birth: 3 October 1993 (age 33)
- Height: 1.75 m (5 ft 9 in)
- Position: Defensive midfielder

Team information
- Current team: Ismaily SC
- Number: 24

Youth career
- 2006–2014: Al Ahly

Senior career*
Years	Team	Apps	(Gls)
2013–2015	Al Ahly	1	(0)
2015–2016	→ Haras El Hodoud (loan)	9	(0)
2016	Baladeyet El Mahalla	30	
2017–2018	Wadi Degla	26	(0)
2018–2020	Zamalek	133	(1)
2020-2021	Ceramica Cleopatra FC	42	(0)
2021	Ismaily SC (Loan)	20	(0)
2020-2023	Al-Masry SC	62	(3)
2023-24	El Mokawloon El Arab	15	(1)
2022-	Ismaily SC	52	(0)
- * Club domestic league appearances and goals as of 7 August 2025 @ 11:04(AEST)

Mohamed Hassan (Arabic: محمد حسن, born 3 October 1993) is an Egyptian professional footballer who plays as a defensive midfielder for Egyptian Premier League club Zamalek.

== Honours ==
Zamalek

- Saudi-Egyptian Super Cup: 2018
- CAF Confederation Cup : 2018–19
- Egypt Cup: 2018–2019
- Egyptian Super Cup: 2019–20
- CAF Super Cup: 2020
