= Ibraheem Mahfus Ajasa =

Nigerian footballer (born 2005)

Personal information
- Date of birth: 26 November 2005 (age 20)
- Place of birth: Lagos, Nigeria
- Height: 1.80 m (5 ft 11 in)
- Position: Left winger

Team information
- Current team: Rostov
- Number: 17

Senior career*
Years	Team	Apps	(Gls)
2024–2025	Modern Sport	5	(0)
2025–	Rostov	1	(0)
- * Club domestic league appearances and goals as of 2 August 2025

Ibraheem Mahfus Ajasa (born 26 November 2005) is a Nigerian football player who plays as a left winger for Russian club Rostov.

== Club career ==
On 11 July 2025, Ajasa signed a contract with Russian Premier League club Rostov. He made his RPL debut for Rostov on 2 August 2025 in a game against Krylia Sovetov Samara.

== Career statistics ==
As of 4 August 2026

Club	Season	League			Cup		Total	
Club	Season	Division	Apps	Goals	Apps	Goals	Apps	Goals
Modern Sport	2024–25	Egyptian Premier League	7	0	–		7	0
Rostov	2025–26	Russian Premier League	1	0	3	0	4	0
Rostov	2026–27	Russian Premier League	0	0	1	0	1	0
Rostov	Total		1	0	4	0	5	0
Career total			9	0	3	0	12	0
