= Steven Owusu Kaakyire =

Ghanaian footballer (born 1995)

Steven Owusu
Personal information
- Full name: Steven Owusu Kaakyire
- Date of birth: 1 January 1995 (age 31)
- Place of birth: Ejisu, Ghana
- Height: 1.76 m (5 ft 9 in)
- Position: Striker

Team information
- Current team: Bechem United
- Number: 9

Youth career
- 2010-2012: Super Vikins FC

Senior career*
Years	Team	Apps	(Gls)
2012–2015	Ebusua Dwarfs FC	21	(9)
2015–2017	Berekum Chelsea	23	(4)
2017–2018	Unity FC	19	(11)
2018–2019	Ngezi Platinum Stars	21	(10)
2020–	Bechem United	20	(5)
- * Club domestic league appearances and goals as of 9 June 2021

Steven Owusu Kaakyire is a Ghanaian professional footballer who plays as forward for Bechem United. He previously played Berekum Chelsea, Ebusua Dwarfs and Ngezi Platinum Stars of the Zimbabwe Premier Soccer League in 2018.

== Career ==
=== Early career ===
Owusu Kaakyire began his career with Super Vikins FC in Hwereso, a neighboring town to his birthplace, Kubease near Ejisu. He later moved in July 2012 to Ebusua Dwarfs. He played for Berekum Chelsea in the Ghana Premier League in the 2015–16 season. He also played for second-tier side Unity FC where he scored 11 goals to emerge as the top-scorer in Division One League Zone I.

=== Ngezi Platinum Stars ===
Zimbabwe was Owusu's next destination, where he joined Ngezi Platinum Stars on March 3, 2018, for their 2018–19 Zimbabwe Premier Soccer League season.

=== Bechem United ===
In October 2020, Owusu returned to Ghana and joined Ahafo-based team Bechem United, ahead of the 2020–21 season. On 16 November 2020, during his debut for the club, he scored a penalty in the 55th minute to help Bechem earn a draw in a match against Liberty Professionals. Owusu scored in two consecutive matches in December to take his tally to three goals. He scored his second goal by scoring in 46th minute in a 2–1 victory over Karela United on 18 December 2020. The next goal came on 27 December 2020 against Ashanti Gold, where he scored the lone goal to help Bechem win and move into first place after match day 6.

== Career statistics ==
=== Club ===
As of December 2016.

Club	Season	League			Cup		Continental		Other		Total	
Club	Season	Division	Apps	Goals	Apps	Goals	Apps	Goals	Apps	Goals	Apps	Goals
Berekum Chelsea	2016 Ghanaian Premier League	Ghanaian Premier League	21	3	0	0	0	0	0	0	21	3
Career total			21	3	0	0	0	0	0	0	21	3
