= Mohamed El Shamy =

Egyptian footballer (born 1993)

Mohamed El-Shamy
Personal information
- Full name: Mohamed Mostafa Ahmad El-Shamy
- Date of birth: September 30, 1993 (age 33)
- Place of birth: Egypt
- Height: 1.75 m (5 ft 9 in)
- Position: Midfielder

Team information
- Current team: Tersana

Youth career
- 2007–2014: Al-Ahly
- 2014–2015: Ismaily

Senior career*
Years	Team	Apps	(Gls)
2015	Haras El Hodoud	1	(0)
2015–2016	Aswan	3	(0)
2016–	Tersana		

International career^{‡}
2009–	Egypt U-20		(0)
- * Club domestic league appearances and goals as of 12 February 2010 ‡ National team caps and goals as of 28 September 2009

Mohamed Mostafa Ahmad El-Shamy (Arabic: محمد مصطفى أحمد الشامي) (born September 30, 1993) is an Egyptian footballer.

== Career ==
El-Shamy plays as a midfielder for Egyptian Premier League club Tersana as well as the Egypt U-20 national team. He was a member of Egypt's squad for the 2013 FIFA U-20 World Cup, but he did not appear in a match.
