= Hamza El Gamal =

Egyptian footballer (born 1970)

Personal information
- Date of birth: 2 March 1970 (age 56)
- Place of birth: Monufia, Egypt
- Height: 1.83 m (6 ft 0 in)
- Position: Defender

Senior career*
Years	Team	Apps	(Gls)
1987–1989	Gazel Shbeen		
1989–1997	Ismaily		
1997–1997	Al Tadhamon SC		
1997–1999	Ismaily		
1999–2000	Suez SC		
2000–2001	Al-Qanah		
2001–2002	Tala'ea El Gaish SC		

International career
1990–1997	Egypt	20	(1)
- * Club domestic league appearances and goals

Hamza El Gamal (Arabic: حَمْزَة الْجَمَل; born 2 March 1970) is an Egyptian former professional footballer who played as a defender.

== Career ==
El Gamal played club football for Ismaily.

He was also part of the Egypt national team at the 1994 African Cup of Nations.
