= Mohamed Adel Gomaa =

Egyptian footballer (born 1993)

Personal information
- Full name: Mohamed Adel Gomaa
- Date of birth: 21 March 1993 (age 33)
- Place of birth: Port Said, Egypt
- Position: Left back

Team information
- Current team: Ismaily SC

Youth career
- Arab Contractors SC

Senior career*
Years	Team	Apps	(Gls)
2013–2014	Arab Contractors SC		
2014–2015	Al-Masry SC	34	(0)
2015–2016	Zamalek SC	5	(0)
2016–	Ismaily SC		

International career
2014–	Egypt U-23		
- * Club domestic league appearances and goals

Mohamed Adel Gomaa (Arabic: محمد عادل جمعة; born 21 Mar 1993) is an Egyptian footballer who plays for Ismaily SC as a left-back.

== Honors ==
Zamalek SC

- Egypt Cup : 2014-15
