= 2024–25 Egyptian League Cup =

Tournament details
- Dates: 11 December 2024 – 10 June 2025
- Teams: 18

The 2024–25 Egyptian League Cup, also known as the Egypt Capital Cup, is the fourth edition of the Egyptian League Cup, a football competition featuring the 18 teams from the Egyptian Premier League, organized by the Egyptian Professional Football Clubs Association (EPL). Ceramica Cleopatra is the current title holder. The winner will qualify to compete in the Egyptian Super Cup.

== Format ==
The teams are divided into four groups, with two groups containing five teams and the other two with four teams, competing in a single round-robin format. The top two teams from each group advance to the knockout stage.

== Group stage ==
The draw took place on 19 October 2024. The match schedule was announced on 28 November 2024.

=== Group A ===
Pos	Team	Pld	W	D	L	GF	GA	GD	Pts	Qualification
1	Petrojet	4	4	0	0	6	2	+4	12	Advance to knockout stage
2	Modern Sport	4	1	2	1	2	1	+1	5	Advance to knockout stage
3	Zamalek	4	1	2	1	3	3	0	5	
4	El Gouna	4	1	2	1	2	2	0	5	
5	Smouha	4	0	0	4	1	6	−5	0	

Source: EPL
Rules for classification: Group stage tiebreakers

11 December 2024	El Gouna	1–0	Smouha	El Gouna
17:00	Shika 65'			Stadium: Khaled Bichara Stadium; Referee: Mohamed El Desouki

11 December 2024	Modern Sport	0–1	Petrojet	Cairo
20:00			Bamba 61'	Stadium: Petrosport Stadium; Referee: Ahmed Hamdy

18 March 2025	Smouha	1–2	Petrojet	Alexandria
21:00				Stadium: Alexandria Stadium

19 March 2025	Zamalek	1–1	El Gouna	Cairo
21:00	M. Hamdi 90+5'		El Zahdi 59'	Stadium: Cairo International Stadium

23 March 2025	Modern Sport	2–0	Smouha	Cairo
21:00				Stadium: Cairo International Stadium

24 March 2025	Petrojet	2–1	Zamalek	Cairo
21:00				Stadium: Cairo Military Academy Stadium

6 April 2025	Petrojet	1–0	El Gouna	Cairo
17:00				Stadium: Cairo Military Academy Stadium

6 April 2025	Zamalek	0–0	Modern Sport	Cairo
17:00				Stadium: Cairo International Stadium

16 April 2025	Smouha	0–1	Zamalek	Alexandria
17:00			Mansi 22'	Stadium: Borg El Arab Stadium

16 April 2025	El Gouna	0–0	Modern Sport	El Gouna
17:00				Stadium: Khaled Bichara Stadium

=== Group B ===
Pos	Team	Pld	W	D	L	GF	GA	GD	Pts	Qualification
1	National Bank	4	2	2	0	9	3	+6	8	Advance to knockout stage
2	Ceramica Cleopatra	4	2	1	1	8	7	+1	7	Advance to knockout stage
3	Ghazl El Mahalla	4	1	2	1	4	5	−1	5	
4	Al Masry	4	0	4	0	3	3	0	4	
5	ZED	4	0	1	3	4	10	−6	1	

Source: EPL
Rules for classification: Group stage tiebreakers

11 December 2024	Ceramica Cleopatra	0–5	National Bank	Cairo
20:00			Faisal 29', 76'; Annor 53', 78'; Helal 85'	Stadium: Osman Ahmed Osman Stadium; Referee: Wael Farhan

12 December 2024	Ghazl El Mahalla	3-1	ZED	El Mahalla El Kubra
20:00				Stadium: Ghazl El Mahalla Stadium

18 March 2025	National Bank	1–1	Ghazl El Mahalla	Cairo
21:00				Stadium: Cairo International Stadium

19 March 2025	Al Masry	1–1	ZED	Suez
21:00	Ebuka 77'		Ahmed 82'	Stadium: Suez Stadium

23 March 2025	Ceramica Cleopatra	3–0	Ghazl El Mahalla	Cairo
21:00				Stadium: Osman Ahmed Osman Stadium

24 March 2025	National Bank	1–1	Al Masry	Suez
21:00				Stadium: Suez Stadium

5 April 2025	ZED	1–2	National Bank	Cairo
20:00				Stadium: Cairo International Stadium

5 April 2025	Al Masry	1–1	Ceramica Cleopatra	Suez
20:00				Stadium: Suez Stadium

17 April 2025	ZED	1–4	Ceramica Cleopatra	Cairo
19:00	Belhadji 49' (o.g.)		Reda 4'; Zalaka 15'; Mohamed 22'; Belhadji 84'	Stadium: Cairo International Stadium

17 April 2025	Ghazl El Mahalla	0–0	Al Masry	Suez
19:00				Stadium: Suez Stadium

=== Group C ===
Pos	Team	Pld	W	D	L	GF	GA	GD	Pts	Qualification
1	Tala'ea El Gaish	3	2	1	0	5	2	+3	7	Advance to knockout stage
2	ENPPI	3	2	0	1	2	1	+1	6	Advance to knockout stage
3	Pharco	3	1	1	1	3	3	0	4	
4	Al Ahly	3	0	0	3	2	6	−4	0	

Source: EPL
Rules for classification: Group stage tiebreakers

12 December 2024	Pharco	1–1	Tala'ea El Gaish	Alexandria
17:00	Sherif 71'		Mohareb 29'	Stadium: Haras El Hodoud Stadium; Referee: Mohamed Abbas Kabil

18 March 2025	Al Ahly	0–1	ENPPI	Cairo
			Zaki 90+1'	Stadium: Cairo International Stadium
Note: The match scheduled for 10 December has been postponed due to Al-Ahly's participation in the 2024 FIFA Intercontinental Cup.

22 March 2025	Tala'ea El Gaish	3–1	Al Ahly	Cairo
21:00	Okwara 4' (pen.); Mohareb 38'; Wahid 61'		El Mahdi 55'	Stadium: Cairo Military Academy Stadium

22 March 2025	ENPPI	1–0	Pharco	Cairo
21:00	Kalosha 29'			Stadium: Petrosport Stadium

17 April 2025	Al Ahly	1–2	Pharco	Cairo
16:00	Hashem 68'		Al-Ashry 11'; Nasser 17'	Stadium: Cairo International Stadium

17 April 2025	Tala'ea El Gaish	1–0	ENPPI	Cairo
16:00				Stadium: Gehaz El Reyada Stadium

=== Group D ===
Pos	Team	Pld	W	D	L	GF	GA	GD	Pts	Qualification
1	Haras El Hodoud	3	3	0	0	5	1	+4	9	Advance to knockout stage
2	Ismaily	3	1	1	1	5	4	+1	4	Advance to knockout stage
3	Pyramids	3	1	1	1	4	4	0	4	
4	Al Ittihad	3	0	0	3	0	5	−5	0	

Source: EPL
Rules for classification: Group stage tiebreakers

11 December 2024	Haras El Hodoud	2–1	Ismaily	Alexandria
17:13	Abou-Gouda 21'; Hakeem 34'		Hamdi 11'	Stadium: Borg El Arab Stadium; Referee: Mohamed El Ghazi
Note: The match was delayed from its original time at 17:00 due to the absence of an ambulance.

17 December 2024	Pyramids	2–0	Al Ittihad	Cairo
19:00	El Karti 64'; El Gabas 88'	Report		Stadium: 30 June Stadium

22 March 2025	Al Ittihad	0–1	Haras El Hodoud	Alexandria
21:00				Stadium: Alexandria Stadium

23 March 2025	Ismaily	2–2	Pyramids	Ismailia
21:00				Stadium: Ismailia Stadium

16 April 2025	Haras El Hodoud	2–0	Pyramids	Alexandria
20:00				Stadium: Haras El Hodoud Stadium

16 April 2025	Ismaily	2–0	Al Ittihad	Ismailia
20:00				Stadium: Ismailia Stadium

== Knockout stage ==
=== Quarter-finals ===
==== First legs ====
22 April 2025	ENPPI	2–0	Haras El Hodoud
19:00

23 April 2025	Ismaily	0–0	Tala'ea El Gaish
17:00

23 April 2025	Modern Sport	0–2	National Bank
19:00

24 April 2025	Ceramica Cleopatra	4–1	Petrojet
19:00

==== Second legs ====
20 May 2025	Tala'ea El Gaish	0–0 (4–5 p)	Ismaily
17:00

20 May 2025	National Bank	1–0	Modern Sport
20:00

21 May 2025	Petrojet	1–0	Ceramica Cleopatra
17:00

21 May 2025	Haras El Hodoud	1–0	ENPPI
20:00

=== Semi-finals ===
==== First legs ====
4 June 2025	Ismaily	0–2	Ceramica Cleopatra

4 June 2025	National Bank	2–1	ENPPI

==== Second legs ====
8 June 2025	Ceramica Cleopatra	1–0	Ismaily

8 June 2025	ENPPI	1–1	National Bank

=== Final ===
12 June 2025	Ceramica Cleopatra	2–0	National Bank
	Bobo 41'; Lakay 80'	Report
