= Baher El Mohamady =

Egyptian footballer (born 26 December 1996)

Personal information
- Full name: Baher Mohamed Moursi El Mohamady
- Date of birth: 26 December 1996 (age 29)
- Place of birth: Ismailia, Egypt
- Height: 1.79 m (5 ft 10 in)
- Position: Defender

Team information
- Current team: Al Masry SC
- Number: 2

Youth career
- Ismaily

Senior career*
Years	Team	Apps	(Gls)
2014–2023	Ismaily	152	(11)
2023–	Al Masry SC	25	(1)

International career
2018–	Egypt	8	(1)
- * Club domestic league appearances and goals

Baher Mohamed Moursi El Mohamady (Arabic: باهر محمد مرسي المحمدي; born 26 December 1996), is an Egyptian footballer who plays for Egyptian Premier League side Ismaily and the Egyptian national team as a defender.

El Mohamady is a player of the Ismaily youth system. He earned his first international cap against Niger on 8 September 2018.

== International statistics ==
=== International ===
Statistics accurate as of match played 7 November 2019.

Egypt
Year	Apps	Goals
2018	4	1
2019	4	0
Total	8	1

Egypt score listed first, score column indicates score after each El Mohamady goal.

International goals by date, venue, cap, opponent, score, result and competition
No.	Date	Venue	Cap	Opponent	Score	Result	Competition
1	16 November 2018	Borg El Arab Stadium, Alexandria, Egypt	4	Tunisia	2–1	3–2	2019 Africa Cup of Nations qualification
