= Abdel Rahman Magdy =

Egyptian footballer (born 1997)

Personal information
- Full name: Abdel Rahman Magdy Sobhi Mohamed
- Date of birth: 12 September 1997 (age 29)
- Place of birth: Egypt
- Height: 1.88 m (6 ft 2 in)
- Position: Winger

Team information
- Current team: Ismaily
- Number: 20

Youth career
- Tersana

Senior career*
Years	Team	Apps	(Gls)
2015–2017	Tersana		
2017–2024	Ismaily	115	(25)
2024–	Pyramids	0	(0)

International career^{‡}
2018-2021	Egypt U23		
2019–	Egypt	1	(0)
- * Club domestic league appearances and goals as of 15:53, 26 February 2019 (UTC) ‡ National team caps and goals as of 23 March 2019

Abdel Rahman Magdy Sobhi Mohamed (Arabic: عَبْد الرَّحْمٰن مَجْدِيّ صُبْحِيّ مُحَمَّد; born 12 September 1997), is an Egyptian footballer who plays for Egyptian Premier League side Pyramids and the Egyptian national team as a winger.

== International ==
He made his debut for the Egypt national football team on 23 March 2019 in an Africa Cup qualifier against Niger, as a 68th-minute substitute for Amar Hamdy.

== Honours ==
=== Egypt ===
- Africa U-23 Cup of Nations Champions: 2019

=== Pyramids ===
- CAF Champions League: 2024–25
- CAF Super Cup: 2025
- FIFA African–Asian–Pacific Cup: 2025
