= Mohamed El Shamy (footballer, born 1996) =

Egyptian footballer (born 1996)

Mohammed Al Shamy
Personal information
- Date of birth: 1 January 1996 (age 30)
- Place of birth: Mit Ghamr, Egypt
- Height: 1.74 m (5 ft 9 in)
- Position: Forward

Team information
- Current team: Al Masry
- Number: 11

Senior career*
Years	Team	Apps	(Gls)
2015–2016	ENPPI	10	(2)
2016–2017	Al Masry	17	(6)
2017–2018	Zamalek	15	(1)
2018–2023	Ismaily	130	(21)
2023–	Al Masry	36	(8)

International career^{‡}
2024–	Egypt	1	(0)
- * Club domestic league appearances and goals as of 21 December 2025 ‡ National team caps and goals as of 22 March 2024

Mohamed Al Shamy (Arabic: محمد الشامي; born 1 January 1996) is an Egyptian footballer who plays for Egyptian Premier League side Al Masry and the Egypt national team as a forward.

== International career ==
Al Shamy made his debut for the senior Egypt national team on 22 March 2024 in a friendly against New Zealand.

== Awards and honours ==
=== Zamalek SC ===
- Egypt Cup (1): 2017–18
