= 2022–23 El Dakhleya SC season =

El Dakhleya SC
2022–23 season
- Manager: Reda Shehata (until 28 January); Alaa Abdel Aal (from 28 January)
- Stadium: Police Academy Stadium
- Egyptian Premier League: 15th
- Egypt Cup: Round of 16
- EFA Cup: Preliminary round
- All statistics correct as of 7 May 2023.

The 2022–23 El Dakhleya SC season is the club's 18th season in existence and the first season back in the top flight of Egyptian football. In addition to the domestic league, El Dakhleya will participate in this season's editions of the Egypt Cup and the EFA Cup.

== Players ==
=== First-team squad ===
As of 7 January 2023

Note: Flags indicate national team as defined under FIFA eligibility rules; some limited exceptions apply. Players may hold more than one non-FIFA nationality.

No.	Pos.	Nation	Player
1	GK	EGY	Mohamed Magdy Abdelfattah
16	GK	EGY	Reda Sayed
—	GK	EGY	Ahmed Soliman
3	DF	EGY	Barakat Haggag
5	DF	EGY	Mahmoud Ezzat
14	DF	EGY	Momen Atef
23	DF	EGY	Mohamed Naguib (footballer)
26	DF	EGY	Ahmed El Amour
66	DF	EGY	Ahmed Abdel Naby
—	DF	EGY	Mahmoud Shedid Kenawi
—	DF	EGY	Mido El Nagar
—	DF	EGY	Mahmoud Mansour
—	DF	EGY	Ahmed Rifai
7	MF	EGY	Abdelaziz El Sayed
8	MF	EGY	Samir Fekri
9	MF	EGY	Hussein Ragab

No.	Pos.	Nation	Player
12	MF	NGR	Christopher John
17	MF	EGY	Mahmoud Talaat
19	MF	EGY	Mohamed Nosseir
29	MF	NGR	Rasheed Ahmed
25	MF	NGR	Kelechi Chimezie
35	MF	NGR	Funom Alfred
11	MF	EGY	Mohab Yasser
—	MF	UGA	Allan Kyambadde
—	MF	CIV	Eric Serge
—	MF	EGY	Ahmed Refo
30	FW	EGY	Hesham Sabry
37	FW	EGY	Essa Abdallah
15	FW	EGY	Mostafa Fawzy
—	FW	EGY	Salah El Deen Yehia
—	FW	NGR	Abdullahi Ojifinni

== Transfers ==
=== In ===
No.	Pos	Player	Transferred from	Fee	Date	Source
	FW	(Nigeria) Abdullahi Ojifinni	(Nigeria) ABS		1 September 2022	
	MF	(Ivory Coast) Eric Serge	(Egypt) Misr Lel Makkasa	Free	27 September 2022	
	DF	(Uganda) Allan Kyambadde	(Egypt) El Gouna	Free	27 September 2022	
	MF	(Nigeria) Kelechi Chimezie	(Nigeria) Gombe United		28 September 2022	
	FW	(Egypt) Salah El Deen Yehia	(Egypt) Pyramids		29 September 2022	
	MF	(Egypt) Ahmed Refo	(Egypt) Smouha		29 September 2022	
	MF	(Nigeria) Funom Alfred	(Nigeria) Nasarawa United		29 September 2022	
	MF	(Egypt) Mohab Yasser	(Egypt) ENPPI	Free	10 October 2022	

=== Out ===
No.	Pos	Player	Transferred to	Fee	Date	Source
	GK	(Egypt) Reda Sayed	(Egypt) ENPPI	Undisclosed	30 January 2023	

== Pre-season and friendlies ==
Win Draw Loss Fixtures

25 September 2022 Friendly	Pioneers (Egypt)	1–0	(Egypt) El Dakhleya	Ismailia
	Magdy (pen.)	Report

7 November 2022 Friendly	Al Masry (Egypt)	3–1	(Egypt) El Dakhleya	Cairo
	Tarek 52'; Grendo 61'; Okpotu 78'	Report

== Competitions ==
=== Overview ===
Competition	First match	Last match	Starting round	Final position	Record							
Competition	First match	Last match	Starting round	Final position	Pld	W	D	L	GF	GA	GD	Win %
Egyptian Premier League	20 October 2022	14 July 2023	Matchday 1	15th	34	7	14	13	32	43	−11	20.59
Egypt Cup	7 May 2023		Round of 32		1	0	1	0	2	2	+0	0.00
EFA Cup	19 November 2022		Preliminary round	Preliminary round	1	0	0	1	1	2	−1	0.00
Total					36	7	15	14	35	47	−12	19.44

Last updated: 14 July 2023
Source: Soccerway

=== Egyptian Premier League ===
==== League table ====
Pos	Team	Pld	W	D	L	GF	GA	GD	Pts	Qualification or relegation
13	Ceramica Cleopatra	34	7	16	11	31	32	−1	37	
14	Tala'ea El Gaish	34	8	12	14	33	45	−12	36	
15	El Dakhleya	34	7	14	13	32	43	−11	35	
16	Aswan (R)	34	8	9	17	31	45	−14	33 (Note: Tied on head-to-head points (3) and on head-to-head goal difference (0). Overall goal difference: Aswan −14, Ghazl El Mahalla −21.)	Relegation to Second Division A
17	Ghazl El Mahalla (R)	34	8	9	17	26	47	−21	33	Relegation to Second Division A

Source: Soccerway
Rules for classification: 1) Points; 2) Head-to-head points; 3) Head-to-head goal difference; 4) Goal difference; 5) Goals scored; 6) Play-off.
(R) Relegated

==== Results summary ====
Overall								Home						Away					
Pld	W	D	L	GF	GA	GD	Pts	W	D	L	GF	GA	GD	W	D	L	GF	GA	GD
31	5	14	12	27	40	−13	29	2	8	6	14	20	−6	3	6	6	13	20	−7

Last updated: 6 June 2023.
Source: worldfootball

==== Results by round ====
Round	1	2	3	4	5	6	7	8	9	10	11	12	13	14	15	16	17	18	19	20	21	22	23	24	25	26	27	28	29	30	31	32
Ground	H	A	H	A	H	A	H	A	H	A	H	A	H	A	H	A	H	A	H	A	H	A	H	A	H	A	H	A	H	A	H	A
Result	D	L	L	L	L	D	D	D	W	D	L	D	D	W	L	L	L	W	L	D	W	W	D	L	D	L	D	D	D	L	D	
Position	12	14	16	17	18	18	18	17	14	15	16	17	16	14	14	15	18	14	15	14	14	14	14									

Updated to match(es) played on 6 June 2023. Source: worldfootball
A = Away; H = Home; W = Win; D = Draw; L = Loss

==== Matches ====
The league fixtures were announced on 9 October 2022.

20 October 2022 1	El Dakhleya	0–0	Tala'ea El Gaish	Cairo
19:00 EST (UTC+2)		Report		Stadium: Police Academy Stadium; Referee: Mahmoud Bassiouni

24 October 2022 1	Al Ittihad	2–0	El Dakhleya	Alexandria
17:00 EST (UTC+2)	Hassan 36'; Amutu 70'	Report		Stadium: Alexandria Stadium; Referee: Walid Abdelrazek

2 November 2022 3	El Dakhleya	1–4	Al Ahly	Suez
17:00 EST (UTC+2)	Alfred 13'	Report	Sherif 2'; Fathi 6'; Fouad 47', 53'	Stadium: Suez Stadium; Referee: Amin Omar

1 December 2022 5	El Dakhleya	0–1	Future	Cairo
14:45 EST (UTC+2)		Report	Ngwem 87'	Stadium: Petrosport Stadium; Referee: Mohammed Yousef

7 December 2022 6	Pharco	1–1	El Dakhleya	Alexandria
14:45 EST (UTC+2)	Sabri 7'	Report	Fawzy 68'	Stadium: Alexandria Stadium; Referee: Mohamed Abass

11 December 2022 4	Ghazl El Mahalla	2–1	El Dakhleya	El Mahalla El Kubra
14:45 EST (UTC+2)	El Sheikh 23' (pen.); El Henawy 82' (pen.)	Report	Fekri 27'	Stadium: Ghazl El Mahalla Stadium; Referee: Mahmoud Wafa

15 December 2022 7	El Dakhleya	0–0	Smouha	Cairo
17:00 EST (UTC+2)		Report		Stadium: Police Academy Stadium; Referee: Mostafa Osman

19 December 2022 8	Ceramica Cleopatra	0–0	El Dakhleya	Cairo
14:45 EST (UTC+2)		Report		Stadium: Cairo International Stadium; Referee: Mostafa El Shahdi

23 December 2022 9	El Dakhleya	2–1	Pyramids	Cairo
19:00 EST (UTC+2)	Atef (yellow card) 53'; Ahmed 73', 78'; El Sayed (yellow card) 90+4'	Report	Lakay 57'; Galal (yellow card) 77'	Stadium: Petrosport Stadium; Referee: Sobhy El Amrawi

28 December 2022 10	ENPPI	0–0	El Dakhleya	Cairo
14:45 EST (UTC+2)	Youssef (yellow card) 44'; Amin (yellow card) 52'; Hamed (yellow card) 69'; Ibrahim (yellow card) 79'	Report	Atef (yellow card) 28'; Fawzy (yellow card) 89'	Stadium: Petrosport Stadium; Referee: Mohamed Al Ghazi

2 January 2023 11	El Dakhleya	0–1	Al Masry	Suez
14:45 EST (UTC+2)		Report	Hamdy 38'; Shahdad (yellow card) 44'	Stadium: Suez Stadium; Referee: Nader Kamar

5 January 2023 12	Zamalek	1–1	El Dakhleya	Cairo
19:00 EST (UTC+2)	Ashour (yellow card) 69'; Abdel Ghani 90+6'	Report	Fekri 25'; Abdel Naby (yellow card) 40'; Abdallah (yellow card) 44'; Ahmed (yellow card) 60'; Atef (yellow card) 65'; El Sayed (yellow card) 84'	Stadium: Cairo International Stadium; Referee: Mahmoud Nagi

11 January 2023 13	El Dakhleya	3–3	National Bank	Cairo
14:45 EST (UTC+2)	Fekri 41'; Haggag 49'; Fawzy 70'	Report	Helal 34', 90+12' (pen.); Diawara 66'	Stadium: Police Academy Stadium; Referee: Ahmed Naji

18 January 2023 14	Haras El Hodoud	0–1	El Dakhleya	Alexandria
14:45 EST (UTC+2)		Report	Fawzy (yellow card) 66'; Atef 74'; Dahesh (yellow card) 87'	Stadium: Haras El Hodoud Stadium; Referee: Abdelaziz El Sayed

22 January 2023 15	El Dakhleya	1–2	Al Mokawloon Al Arab	Cairo
17:00 EST (UTC+2)	Haggag 10'; Ragab (yellow card) 31'; Chimezie (red card) 37'; Talaat (yellow card) 56' (red card) 75'; Kyambadde (yellow card) 82'	Report	Alaa (yellow card) 33'; Okoli 54'; Hinestroza (yellow card) 84'; Niass 90+4', (yellow card) 90+5'	Stadium: Petrosport Stadium; Referee: Walid Abdelrazek

27 January 2023 16	Ismaily	3–1	El Dakhleya	Ismailia
17:00 EST (UTC+2)	Makhlouf 22'; Chaouat 41'; Abdel Samiae (yellow card) 42'; El Shamy 85'; Fawzy (yellow card) 90+4'	Report	Fawzy 75'	Stadium: Ismailia Stadium; Referee: Amin Omar

5 February 2023 17	El Dakhleya	1–2	Aswan	Cairo
14:45 EST (UTC+2)	Fekri 28' (pen.)	Report	Khaled 1'; Zaki 40'	Stadium: Petrosport Stadium; Referee: Wael Farhan

11 February 2023 18	Tala'ea El Gaish	0–1	El Dakhleya	Cairo
19:00 EST (UTC+2)		Report	El Zahdi 51'	Stadium: Gehaz El Reyada Stadium; Referee: Mostafa Osman

20 February 2023 19	El Dakhleya	1–2	Al Ittihad	Suez
17:00 EST (UTC+2)	John 69'	Report	Alaa 25'; Abdel Naby 90+6'	Stadium: Suez Stadium; Referee: Mohamed El Hanafi

28 February 2023 20	Al Ahly	1–1	El Dakhleya	Cairo
19:00 EST (UTC+2)	Kahraba 70'	Report	Ahmed 90'	Stadium: Al Ahly WE Al Salam Stadium; Referee: Mohamed Maarouf

6 March 2023 21	El Dakhleya	2–1	Ghazl El Mahalla	Cairo
15:00 EST (UTC+2)	Fekri 19'; El Banouby 46'	Report	El Sheikh 87' (pen.)	Stadium: Petrosport Stadium; Referee: Mohamed Salama

4 April 2023 23	El Dakhleya	0–0	Pharco	Cairo
21:15 EST (UTC+2)		Report		Stadium: Petrosport Stadium; Referee: Ibrahim Nour El Din

9 April 2023 24	Smouha	4–3	El Dakhleya	Alexandria
21:15 EST (UTC+2)	Hassan 2'; Boateng 21', 33'; Ougola 43'	Report	Kyambadde 24'; Fekri 71' (pen.); El Sayed 88' (pen.)	Stadium: Alexandria Stadium; Referee: Nader Kamar

12 April 2023 25	El Dakhleya	0–0	Ceramica Cleopatra	Cairo
21:15 EST (UTC+2)		Report		Stadium: Petrosport Stadium; Referee: Mohamed Al Ghazi

18 April 2023 26	Pyramids	2–0	El Dakhleya	Cairo
21:15 EST (UTC+2)		Report		Stadium: 30 June Stadium; Referee: Mahmoud Ashour

25 April 2023 22	Future	0–1	El Dakhleya	Cairo
20:30 EST (UTC+2)		Report	Kyambadde 89'	Stadium: Al Salam Stadium; Referee: Tarek Magdy

2 May 2023 27	El Dakhleya	1–1	ENPPI	Cairo
21:30 EST (UTC+3)		Report		Stadium: Petrosport Stadium; Referee: Ahmed Gamal
Note: The game, which was initially slated for 24 April 2023, was postponed.

15 May 2023 28	Al Masry	1–1	El Dakhleya	Borg El Arab
19:00 EST (UTC+2)	Grendo 45'	Report	Fekri 90+7' (pen.)	Stadium: Borg El Arab Stadium; Referee: Mohamed El Hanafi

22 May 2023 29	El Dakhleya	1–1	Zamalek	Suez
21:30 EST (UTC+3)	Fekri 84' (pen.)	Report	Jaziri 21'	Stadium: Suez Stadium; Referee: Mahmoud El Banna

31 May 2023 30	National Bank	3–1	El Dakhleya	Cairo
19:00 EST (UTC+3)	Kaoud 22'; Faisal 32', 61' (pen.)	Report	Fekri 56' (pen.)	Stadium: Cairo International Stadium; Referee: Ahmed Ghandour

6 June 2023 31	El Dakhleya	1–1	Haras El Hodoud	Cairo
19:00 EST (UTC+3)	Ahmed 64'	Report	Abdallah 90+2'	Stadium: Police Academy Stadium; Referee: Mohammed Yousef

=== Egypt Cup ===
7 May 2023 Round of 32	El Dakhleya	2–2 (4–3 p)	Aswan	Cairo
18:00 EST (UTC+3)	Kyambadde 21'; Talaat 68'	Report	Gamal 45+1'; Abdel Rasoul 90+4'	Stadium: Petrosport Stadium; Referee: Abdel Rahman Saleh
	Penalties
	Fekri (penalty missed); Mostafa (penalty scored); Nosseir (penalty scored); Talaat (penalty scored); Ramadan (penalty scored)		(penalty scored) Gamal; (penalty missed) Fahmy; (penalty scored) Morsy; (penalty scored) Saoudi; (penalty missed) Hamdi

30 July 2023 Round of 16	Al Ahly	v	El Dakhleya	Cairo
20:30 EST (UTC+3)				Stadium: Cairo International Stadium

=== EFA Cup ===
19 November 2022 Preliminary round	El Dakhleya	1–2 (a.e.t.)	Haras El Hodoud	Suez
18:00 EST (UTC+2)	Alfred 77'		Gamal 71' (pen.); Emmanuel 111'	Stadium: Suez Stadium; Referee: Sayed Shaaban
