= 2022–23 ENPPI SC season =

ENPPI SC
2022–23 season
- Chairman: Ayman Al-Sharei
- Manager: Ahmed Koshary (until 20 December); Talaat Youssef (from 25 December until 3 February); Tamer Mostafa (from 4 February)
- Stadium: Petro Sport Stadium
- Egyptian Premier League: 6th
- Egypt Cup: Semi-finals
- EFA Cup: Quarter-finals
- Top goalscorer: League: Ahmed Amin Aoufa (10); All: Ahmed Amin Aoufa (11)

The 2022–23 ENPPI SC season was the club's 38th season in existence and the 21st consecutive season in the top flight of Egyptian football. In addition to the domestic league, ENPPI participated in this season's editions of the Egypt Cup and the EFA Cup.

== Overview ==
On 17 September, it was announced that coach Jorvan Vieira would not continue in his position after ENPPI finished ninth last season. Ahmed Abdel Moneim (Koshary) was names as the successor.

== Players ==
=== First-team squad ===
Note: Flags indicate national team as defined under FIFA eligibility rules; some limited exceptions apply. Players may hold more than one non-FIFA nationality.

No.	Pos.	Nation	Player
1	GK	EGY	Abdel Aziz El Baalouti
2	DF	EGY	Ali Fawzy
4	DF	EGY	Ibrahim Yehia (Captain)
5	DF	TUN	Zied Boughattas
7	MF	EGY	Hossam Arafat
8	DF	EGY	Hesham Adel
9	FW	EGY	Ibrahim Galal
10	MF	EGY	Mohamed Morsi
11	MF	EGY	Mostafa Shalaby
12	DF	EGY	Mahmoud Naim
13	DF	GHA	Masahudu Alhassan
14	MF	EGY	Salah Rico
15	FW	EGY	Ahmed Gomaa
18	DF	EGY	Marwan Daoud
17	DF	EGY	Mohamed Ismail
19	DF	EGY	Ibrahim El Kadi

No.	Pos.	Nation	Player
20	MF	EGY	Mohamed Sherif
21	DF	EGY	Khaled Reda
22	MF	EGY	Ahmed El Agouz (Vice-captain)
23	MF	EGY	Mohab Yasser
24	FW	NGR	John Ebuka
25	MF	EGY	Mostafa Gamal
27	GK	EGY	Mahmoud Gad
28	MF	EGY	Girgis Magdy
29	FW	NGR	Dinopeter Airaodion
32	MF	EGY	Mostafa Shakshak
34	DF	EGY	Abdallah Adel
35	MF	EGY	Ahmed Kasem
36	MF	EGY	Ziad Kamal
—	DF	EGY	Omar Adly
—	MF	NIG	Victorien Adebayor (on loan from Køge)

== Transfers ==
=== In ===
No.	Pos	Player	Transferred from	Fee	Date	Source
	MF	(Egypt) Salah Zayed	(Egypt) Dekernes	Undisclosed	15 September 2022	
27	FW	(Tunisia) Rafik Kabou	(Egypt) Wadi Degla	€306,000	30 September 2022	
	MF	(Ethiopia) Shimelis Bekele	(Egypt) El Gouna	Free	8 October 2022	
31	MF	(Burkina Faso) Eric Traoré	(Egypt) Pyramids	Loan	10 October 2022	
	MF	(Egypt) Naser Naser	(Egypt) Al Ittihad	Loan	22 January 2023	
	GK	(Egypt) Reda Sayed	(Egypt) El Dakhleya	Undisclosed	30 January 2023	
	FW	(Egypt) Amr Marey	Unattached	Free	30 January 2023	

=== Out ===
No.	Pos	Player	Transferred to	Fee	Date	Source
	MF	(Egypt) Salah Atef	(Egypt) Ghazl El Mahalla	Free	24 September 2022	
	MF	(Egypt) Mohab Yasser	(Egypt) El Dakhleya	Free	10 October 2022	
	MF	(Egypt) Mostafa Shalaby	(Egypt) Zamalek	LE 20,000,000	10 October 2022	
	MF	(Egypt) Hossam Arafat	(Egypt) Aswan	Free	30 January 2023	
	MF	(Egypt) Mohamed Morsi	(Egypt) Aswan	Free	30 January 2023	

== Pre-season and friendlies ==
Win Draw Loss Fixtures

29 September 2022 Friendly	ENPPI (Egypt)	2–0	(Egypt) Gomhoryet Shebin	Borg El Arab
	Magdy (pen.); Zayed	Report

30 September 2022 Friendly	ENPPI (Egypt)	1–2	(Egypt) Kahrabaa Ismailia	Borg El Arab
16:00			Safwat; Bassiouni

2 October 2022 Friendly	ENPPI (Egypt)	1–0	(Egypt) National Bank	Borg El Arab
	Aoufa 78'	Report

3 October 2022 Friendly	Haras El Hodoud (Egypt)	1–2	(Egypt) ENPPI	Alexandria
	55'		Magdy (pen.); Zayed	Stadium: Haras El Hodoud Stadium

10 October 2022 Friendly	ENPPI (Egypt)	1–2	(Egypt) Al Mokawloon Al Arab
			Saviola; Farid

30 January 2023 Friendly	ENPPI (Egypt)	0–0	(Sudan) Al-Merrikh	Cairo
		Report

== Competitions ==
=== Overview ===
Competition	First match	Last match	Starting round	Final position	Record							
Competition	First match	Last match	Starting round	Final position	Pld	W	D	L	GF	GA	GD	Win %
Egyptian Premier League	19 October 2022	15 July 2023	Matchday 1	6th	34	13	6	15	30	36	−6	38.24
Egypt Cup	8 May 2023	4 October 2023	Round of 32	Semi-finals	4	2	1	1	7	5	+2	50.00
EFA Cup	26 March 2023	28 April 2023	Round of 16	Quarter-finals	2	0	1	1	3	4	−1	0.00
Total					40	15	8	17	40	45	−5	37.50

Source: Soccerway

=== Egyptian Premier League ===
==== League table ====
Pos	Team	Pld	W	D	L	GF	GA	GD	Pts	Qualification or relegation
4	Future	34	15	13	6	34	23	+11	58	Qualification for the Confederation Cup second round (Note: Since the 2022–23 Egypt Cup wouldn't finish by the CAF deadline for associations to submit teams participating in next season's African competitions, the spot awarded to the Egypt Cup winners (Confederation Cup first or second round) was passed to the fourth-placed team in the league.)
5	Al Masry	34	11	15	8	34	33	+1	48	
6	ENPPI	34	13	6	15	34	40	−6	45	
7	Al Mokawloon Al Arab	34	9	17	8	35	33	+2	44	
8	Al Ittihad	34	12	7	15	36	43	−7	43	

Source: Soccerway
Rules for classification: 1) Points; 2) Head-to-head points; 3) Head-to-head goal difference; 4) Goal difference; 5) Goals scored; 6) Play-off.

==== Results summary ====
Overall								Home						Away					
Pld	W	D	L	GF	GA	GD	Pts	W	D	L	GF	GA	GD	W	D	L	GF	GA	GD
30	11	6	13	30	36	−6	39	5	5	5	14	15	−1	6	1	8	16	21	−5

Last updated: 1 June 2023.
Source: worldfootball

==== Results by round ====
Round	1	2	3	4	5	6	7	8	9	10	11	12	13	14	15	16	17	18	19	20	21	22	23	24	25	26	27	28	29	30	31
Ground	H	A	A	H	A	H	A	H	A	H	A	H	A	H	A	H	A	A	H	H	A	H	A	H	A	H	A	H	A	H	A
Result	D	L	L	D	W	D	L	L	L	D	W	L	L	L	W	L	W	L	D	L	W	W	W	W	L	W	D	W	L	W	
Position	6	12	14	15	13	12	14	15	17	16	14	15	17	17	15	16	14	15	14	15	13	13	13	11							

Updated to match(es) played on 1 June 2023. Source: worldfootball
A = Away; H = Home; W = Win; D = Draw; L = Loss

==== Matches ====
The league fixtures were announced on 9 October 2022.

19 October 2022 1	ENPPI	1–1	Pyramids	Cairo
17:00 EST (UTC+2)	Kabou 58'	Report	Fathi 20'	Stadium: Petrosport Stadium; Referee: Amin Omar

25 October 2022 2	Tala'ea El Gaish	2–1	ENPPI	Cairo
19:00 EST (UTC+2)	Kamar 15', 67'	Report	Kabou 13'	Stadium: Gehaz El Reyada Stadium; Referee: Youssouf Mohammed

29 October 2022 3	Al Masry	2–0	ENPPI	Borg El Arab
17:00 EST (UTC+2)	Hamdy 73'; Deghmoum 90+3'	Report		Stadium: Borg El Arab Stadium; Referee: Mohamed Adel

2 November 2022 4	ENPPI	1–1	Zamalek	Cairo
19:00 EST (UTC+2)	Kalousha 84'	Report	Zizo 45' (pen.)	Stadium: Osman Ahmed Osman Stadium; Referee: Mahmoud El Banna

30 November 2022 5	National Bank	2–3	ENPPI	Cairo
14:45 EST (UTC+2)	Kaoud 87'; Helal 90+8' (pen.)	Report	Kabou 2'; Labib 5'; Abdel Aati 26'	Stadium: Cairo International Stadium; Referee: Ahmed Gamal

8 December 2022 6	ENPPI	0–0	Haras El Hodoud	Cairo
14:45 EST (UTC+2)		Report		Stadium: Petrosport Stadium; Referee: Mahmoud Nassif

15 December 2022 7	Al Mokawloon Al Arab	3–2	ENPPI	Cairo
19:00 EST (UTC+2)	Wael 23'; Ochaya 57', 62' (pen.)	Report	Aoufa 15'; Kabou 18'	Stadium: Osman Ahmed Osman Stadium; Referee: Mohammed Yousef

20 December 2022 8	ENPPI	1–2	Ismaily	Cairo
14:45 EST (UTC+2)	Fawzy 90+9' (pen.)	Report	Annor 16'; El Mohamady 90+1' (pen.)	Stadium: Petrosport Stadium; Referee: Mohamed Maarouf

24 December 2022 9	Aswan	2–0	ENPPI	Aswan
14:45 EST (UTC+2)	Zaki 18'; Kamone 42'	Report		Stadium: Aswan Stadium; Referee: Mohamed Adel

28 December 2022 10	ENPPI	0–0	El Dakhleya	Cairo
14:45 EST (UTC+2)	Youssef (yellow card) 44'; Aoufa (yellow card) 52'; Hamed (yellow card) 69'; Ibrahim (yellow card) 79'	Report	Atef (yellow card) 28'; Fawzy (yellow card) 89'	Stadium: Petrosport Stadium; Referee: Mohamed Al Ghazi

2 January 2023 11	Al Ittihad	1–2	ENPPI	Alexandria
17:00 EST (UTC+2)	Mabululu 84'	Report	Aoufa 32'; Kabou 67'	Stadium: Alexandria Stadium; Referee: Mahmoud Nagi

5 January 2023 12	ENPPI	0–2	Al Ahly	Cairo
17:00 EST (UTC+2)	Reda (yellow card) 41'	Report	Afsha 59', (yellow card) 59'; Dieng 77'	Stadium: Osman Ahmed Osman Stadium; Referee: Mahmoud El Banna

12 January 2023 13	Ghazl El Mahalla	1–0	ENPPI	El Mahalla El Kubra
17:00 EST (UTC+2)	Orok 39'	Report		Stadium: Ghazl El Mahalla Stadium; Referee: Nader Kamar

18 January 2023 14	ENPPI	2–3	Future	Cairo
19:00 EST (UTC+2)	Dowidar 37'; El Tayeeb (yellow card) 44'; Fawzi 60' (pen.); Eid (yellow card) 90'; Reda (yellow card) 90+5'	Report	Reda 50' (pen.); El Ouadi 60'; Rizk (yellow card) 70'; Shaaban (yellow card) 73'; El Said 90+4'	Stadium: Petrosport Stadium; Referee: Mohamed Maarouf

23 January 2023 15	Pharco	0–1	ENPPI	Alexandria
14:45 EST (UTC+2)		Report	Fawzi 90+9' (pen.)	Stadium: Alexandria Stadium; Referee: Mohammed Yousef

29 January 2023 16	ENPPI	0–2	Smouha	Cairo
14:45 EST (UTC+2)	Shakshak (yellow card) 54'; Abdel Aati (yellow card) 82'	Report	Shabana 25'; Mostafa 55'	Stadium: Petrosport Stadium; Referee: Mahmoud Nagi

5 February 2023 17	Ceramica Cleopatra	0–1	ENPPI	Cairo
19:00 EST (UTC+2)		Report	Youssef 2'	Stadium: Cairo International Stadium; Referee: Sayed Munir

16 February 2023 18	Pyramids	2–1	ENPPI	Cairo
19:00 EST (UTC+2)	Sobhi 24'; Hamdy 67'	Report	Kabou 13'	Stadium: 30 June Stadium; Referee: Abdelaziz El Sayed

20 February 2023 19	ENPPI	0–0	Tala'ea El Gaish	Cairo
19:00 EST (UTC+2)		Report		Stadium: Petrosport Stadium; Referee: Mahmoud Ashour

28 February 2023 20	ENPPI	1–2	Al Masry	Borg El Arab
17:00 EST (UTC+2)	Aoufa 82'	Report	Hamdi 31'; Kamal 50'	Stadium: Borg El Arab Stadium; Referee: Mohamed Al Kalawy

12 March 2023 21	Zamalek	0–2	ENPPI	Cairo
19:00 EST (UTC+2)		Report	Kabou 20'; Fawzi 67'	Stadium: Cairo International Stadium; Referee: Abdelaziz El Sayed

30 March 2023 22	ENPPI	2–1	National Bank	Cairo
21:15 EST (UTC+2)	Aoufa 14'; Dawoud 61'	Report	Bambo 31'	Stadium: Petrosport Stadium; Referee: Nader Kamar

3 April 2023 23	Haras El Hodoud	0–1	ENPPI	Alexandria
21:15 EST (UTC+2)		Report	El Tayeeb 48'	Stadium: Haras El Hodoud Stadium; Referee: Mohamed Kabil

9 April 2023 24	ENPPI	2–1	Al Mokawloon Al Arab	Cairo
21:15 EST (UTC+2)	Kalousha 12'; Kabou 40'	Report	Okoli 20'	Stadium: Petrosport Stadium; Referee: Mohammed Yousef

13 April 2023 25	Ismaily	3–1	ENPPI	Ismailia
21:15 EST (UTC+2)	Chaouat 41', 45+2', 57'	Report	Hawash 70'	Stadium: Ismailia Stadium; Referee: Mohamed Al Kalawy

18 April 2023 26	ENPPI	2–0	Aswan	Cairo
21:15 EST (UTC+2)	Aoufa 9'; Fathy 51' (o.g.)	Report		Stadium: Petrosport Stadium; Referee: Sobhy El Amrawi

2 May 2023 27	El Dakhleya	1–1	ENPPI	Cairo
21:30 EST (UTC+3)	Abou Elfetouh 84'	Report	El Agouz 26'	Stadium: Petrosport Stadium; Referee: Ahmed Gamal
Note: The game, which was initially slated for 24 April 2023, was postponed.

15 May 2023 28	ENPPI	1–0	Al Ittihad	Cairo
21:30 EST (UTC+3)	Aoufa 56'	Report		Stadium: Petrosport Stadium; Referee: Mahmoud El Banna

23 May 2023 29	Al Ahly	2–0	ENPPI	Cairo
21:30 EST (UTC+3)	Sherif 29'; Abdelkader 35'	Report		Stadium: Cairo International Stadium; Referee: Mahmoud Bassiouni

1 June 2023 30	ENPPI	1–0	Ghazl El Mahalla	Cairo
21:30 EST (UTC+3)	Aoufa 84'	Report		Stadium: Petrosport Stadium; Referee: Mohamed Al Kalawy

6 June 2023 31	Future	1–0	ENPPI	Cairo
21:30 EST (UTC+3)	Atef 54'			Stadium: Al Salam Stadium; Referee: Mohamed El Sabahi

30 June 2023 32	ENPPI	2–1	Pharco	Cairo
19:00 EST (UTC+3)		Report		Stadium: Petrosport Stadium; Referee: Mohammed Abbas

11 July 2023 33	Smouha	2–1	ENPPI	Alexandria
20:30 EST (UTC+3)				Stadium: Alexandria Stadium; Referee: Mohamed Al Ghazi

15 July 2023 34	ENPPI	1–0	Ceramica Cleopatra	Cairo
19:00 EST (UTC+3)				Stadium: Petrosport Stadium; Referee: Shahenda El Maghrabi

=== Egypt Cup ===
8 May 2023 Round of 32	ENPPI	3–0	La Viena	Cairo
18:00 EST (UTC+3)	Amin 45'; El Agouz 70' (pen.); Galal 90+2'	Report		Stadium: Petrosport Stadium; Referee: Islam El Kamash

28 May 2023 (Note: The ENPPI v Future match, originally scheduled to be played between 22 and 24 June 2023, was played ahead of the planned schedule as both teams were available to play as they did not have any matches scheduled in that period.) Round of 16	ENPPI	1–1 (a.e.t.) (6–5 p)	Future	Cairo
21:30 EST (UTC+3)	Kalosha 90+21' (pen.)	Report	Reda 57'	Stadium: Petrosport Stadium; Referee: Nader Kamar El Dawla
	Penalties
	Hawash (penalty scored); Amin (penalty scored); Hamdy (penalty scored); El Agouz (penalty scored); Kalosha (penalty scored); Dawoud (penalty scored)		(penalty scored) Reda; (penalty scored) Kamal; (penalty scored) El Said; (penalty scored) Barry; (penalty scored) El Fil; (penalty missed) Atef

4 July 2023 Quarter-finals	Nogoom	1–3	ENPPI	Cairo
18:00 EST (UTC+3)	Gamal 22'	Report	Emad 14'; El Khashab 52'; Kalosha 70'	Stadium: Petrosport Stadium; Referee: Walid Abdel Razek

4 October 2023 Semi-finals	Al Ahly	3–0	ENPPI	Cairo
21:00 EST (UTC+3)	Maâloul 33' (pen.); Modeste 50'; Ashour 86'	Report		Stadium: Cairo International Stadium; Referee: Tarek Magdy

=== EFA Cup ===
26 March 2023 Round of 16	Pyramids	1–1 (5–6 p)	ENPPI	Cairo
21:15 EST (UTC+2)	Hafez 89'		Naser 85'	Stadium: 30 June Stadium; Referee: Mohamed El Atabani
	Penalties
	El Said (penalty scored); El Karti (penalty scored); Hafez (penalty missed); Tawfik (penalty scored); Samy (penalty scored); Fathy (penalty scored); Chibi (penalty missed)		(penalty scored) Fawzi; (penalty missed) Yousef; (penalty scored) Hamed; (penalty scored) Aoufa; (penalty scored) Kalousha; (penalty scored) Zayed
Note: The match was postponed for one day due to the 30 June stadium hosting the Egypt and Malawi match in the 2023 African Cup of Nations qualifiers.

28 April 2023 Quarter-finals	Al Ittihad	3–2	ENPPI	Alexandria
19:00 EST (UTC+3)		Report		Stadium: Alexandria Stadium
