= 2022–23 Al Masry SC season =

Al Masry SC
2022–23 season
- Chairman: Kamel Abou-Aly
- Manager: Ehab Galal (until 1 December); Tarek Soliman (caretaker, from 3 December); Hossam Hassan (from 14 December until 6 May); Mimi Abdel Razek (from 6 May)
- Stadium: Suez Stadium
- Egyptian Premier League: 5th
- Egypt Cup: Quarter-finals
- EFA Cup: Runners-up
- Top goalscorer: League: Mohamed Grendo (9); All: Mohamed Grendo (9)
- Biggest win: Al Masry 2–0 ENPPI
- Biggest defeat: Al Masry 0–3 Ceramica Cleopatra

The 2022–23 Al Masry SC season was the club's 103rd season in existence and the 10th consecutive season in the top flight of Egyptian football. In addition to the domestic league, Al Masry participated in this season's editions of the Egypt Cup and the EFA Cup.

== Overview ==
Head coach Ehab Galal was sacked on 1 December after four rounds due to inconsistent results and was replaced by veteran Hossam Hassan. Who after a 3–1 loss to Aswan SC was sacked as head coach.

== Players ==
=== First-team squad ===
As of 18 January 2023

Note: Flags indicate national team as defined under FIFA eligibility rules; some limited exceptions apply. Players may hold more than one non-FIFA nationality.

No.	Pos.	Nation	Player
1	GK	EGY	Essam Tharwat
27	GK	EGY	Mahmoud Gad
31	GK	EGY	Mohamed Shehata
—	GK	EGY	Ihab El Aiady
3	DF	ALG	Imadeddine Boubekeur
4	DF	EGY	Mohamed Dabash
7	DF	EGY	Karim El Eraki
13	DF	EGY	Amr El Saadawy
14	DF	TUN	Elyes Jelassi
17	DF	EGY	Hussein Al Sayed
38	DF	EGY	Islam Al Mazayen
—	DF	EGY	Mohamed Gad
—	DF	EGY	Karim Alaa
8	MF	EGY	Amr Moussa (captain)
10	MF	EGY	Hassan Ali
20	MF	NGR	Emeka Christian Eze

No.	Pos.	Nation	Player
22	MF	EGY	Ahmed El Sheikh
30	MF	EGY	Islam Abou Slemma
35	MF	EGY	Ahmed Shadad
40	MF	EGY	Osama El Gazzar
39	MF	EGY	Zyad Farag
—	MF	EGY	Islam Ateia
—	MF	EGY	Sherif Dabo
—	MF	EGY	Mostafa Abou El Hassan
—	MF	EGY	Ragab Omran
9	FW	EGY	Amr Marei
18	FW	ALG	Abderrahim Deghmoum
19	FW	EGY	Marwan Hamdy
21	FW	EGY	Mohamed Grendo
28	FW	NGR	Anthony Okpotu
37	FW	CMR	Franck Mbella Etouga
—	FW	EGY	Mohamed El Gamal

== Transfers ==
=== In ===
No.	Pos	Player	Transferred from	Fee	Date	Source
18	MF	(Algeria) Abderrahim Deghmoum	(Algeria) ES Sétif	€250,000	24 August 2022	
3	DF	(Algeria) Imadeddine Boubekeur	(Morocco) Wydad AC	Free	4 September 2022	
28	FW	(Nigeria) Anthony Okpotu	Qatar SC	Undisclosed	13 September 2022	
17	DF	(Egypt) Hussein El Sayed	(Egypt) Pyramids	Undisclosed	13 September 2022	
13	DF	(Egypt) Amr El Saadawy	(Egypt) El Gouna	Undisclosed	15 September 2022	
37	FW	(Cameroon) Franck Mbella Etouga	(Ghana) Asante Kotoko	€400,000	18 September 2022	
	FW	(Egypt) Abdo Yehia	(Egypt) Ghazl El Mahalla	Loan	30 January 2023	

=== Out ===
No.	Pos	Player	Transferred to	Fee	Date	Source
19	FW	(Palestine) Mohammed Balah		Free	15 September 2022	
17	FW	(Nigeria) Austin Amutu	(Egypt) Al Ittihad	Free	22 September 2022	
27	DF	(Egypt) Ahmed Alaa		Free	28 September 2022	
	FW	(Egypt) Ahmed Hamoudi	(Egypt) Aswan	Free	5 October 2022	
	GK	(Egypt) Ahmed Masoud	Contract termination		6 January 2023	
5	MF	(Egypt) Farid Shawky	(Egypt) Tala'ea El Gaish	Loan	10 January 2023	
23	DF	(Egypt) Amro Tarek	(United States) Austin FC	Free	27 January 2023	

== Pre-season and friendlies ==
Win Draw Loss Fixtures

22 September 2022 Friendly	Al Masry (Egypt)	12–0	(Egypt) Al-Arabi	Cairo
	El Eraki; Moussa (pen.); El Saadawy; Marey; El Sheikh; Grendo; Ateya; Antar	Report

25 September 2022 Friendly	Al Masry (Egypt)	2–0	(Egypt) Ittihad El Shorta	Cairo
	Moussa 4' (pen.); Etouga 90'	Report

4 October 2022 Friendly	Smouha (Egypt)	1–1	(Egypt) Al Masry	Alexandria
	Moustafa 78'	Report	Hamdy 57'	Stadium: Alexandria Stadium

10 October 2022 Friendly	Al Masry (Egypt)	3–1	(Egypt) Ras El-Bar	Ismailia
	Ateya 18'; El-Gazzar 30'; Marey 39'	Report	60'

6 November 2022 Friendly	Al Masry (Egypt)	0–2	(Egypt) El Qanah	Cairo
		Report	Salama 7'; Mwanda 24'	Referee: Ibrahim Mahgoub

7 November 2022 Friendly	Al Masry (Egypt)	3–1	(Egypt) El Dakhleya	Cairo
	Tarek 52'; Grendo 61'; Okpotu 78'	Report

13 November 2022 Friendly	Al Masry (Egypt)	0–0	(Egypt) Haras El Hodoud	Cairo

25 February 2023 Friendly	Al Masry (Egypt)	5–0	(Egypt) Al-Amal	Port Said
		Report

13 March 2023 Friendly	Al Masry (Egypt)	5–1	(Egypt) Al-Amal	Port Said
	Jelassi; Deghmoum; Al-Zarif	Report	Al-Morsi

== Competitions ==
=== Overview ===
Competition	First match	Last match	Starting round	Final position	Record							
Competition	First match	Last match	Starting round	Final position	Pld	W	D	L	GF	GA	GD	Win %
Egyptian Premier League	18 October 2022	26 July 2023	Matchday 1	5th	34	11	15	8	34	33	+1	32.35
Egypt Cup	8 May 2023	3 August 2023	Round of 32	Quarter-final	3	2	0	1	6	3	+3	66.67
EFA Cup	29 April 2023	22 July 2023	Round of 16	Runners-up	3	1	1	1	3	3	+0	33.33
Total					40	14	16	10	43	39	+4	35.00

Last updated: 26 July 2023
Source: Soccerway

=== Egyptian Premier League ===
==== League table ====
Pos	Team	Pld	W	D	L	GF	GA	GD	Pts	Qualification or relegation
3	Zamalek	34	17	9	8	52	36	+16	60	Qualification for the Confederation Cup second round (Note: Since the 2022–23 Egypt Cup wouldn't finish by the CAF deadline for associations to submit teams participating in next season's African competitions, the spot awarded to the Egypt Cup winners (Confederation Cup first or second round) was passed to the fourth-placed team in the league.)
4	Future	34	15	13	6	34	23	+11	58	Qualification for the Confederation Cup second round
5	Al Masry	34	11	15	8	34	33	+1	48	
6	ENPPI	34	13	6	15	34	40	−6	45	
7	Al Mokawloon Al Arab	34	9	17	8	35	33	+2	44	

Source: Soccerway
Rules for classification: 1) Points; 2) Head-to-head points; 3) Head-to-head goal difference; 4) Goal difference; 5) Goals scored; 6) Play-off.

==== Results summary ====
Overall								Home						Away					
Pld	W	D	L	GF	GA	GD	Pts	W	D	L	GF	GA	GD	W	D	L	GF	GA	GD
34	11	15	8	34	33	+1	48	6	6	5	18	17	+1	5	9	3	16	16	0

Source: worldfootball

==== Results by round ====
Round	1	2	3	4	5	6	7	8	9	10	11	12	13	14	15	16	17	18	19	20	21	22	23	24	25	26	27	28	29	30	31	32	33	34
Ground	H	A	H	A	A	H	A	H	A	H	A	H	A	H	A	H	A	A	H	A	H	H	A	H	A	H	A	H	A	H	A	H	A	H
Result	L	D	W	L	D	D	D	D	W	L	W	W	D	D	D	L	D	L	D	W	W	W	D	W	D	L	L	D	W	D	D	W	W	L
Position	18	15	9	12	14	15	11	10	9	11	10	8	8	8	8	8	9	11	10	9	7	7	7											

Source: worldfootball
A = Away; H = Home; W = Win; D = Draw; L = Loss

==== Matches ====
The league fixtures were announced on 9 October 2022.

18 October 2022 1	Al Masry	0–3	Ceramica Cleopatra	Borg El Arab
19:00 EST (UTC+2)		Report	Gaber 15'; Ebuka 30'; Rayyan 59'	Stadium: Borg El Arab Stadium; Referee: Sayed Munir

23 October 2022 2	Pyramids	0–0	Al Masry	Cairo
15:00 EST (UTC+2)		Report		Stadium: 30 June Stadium; Referee: Tarek Magdy

29 October 2022 3	Al Masry	2–0	ENPPI	Borg El Arab
17:00 EST (UTC+2)	Hamdy 73'; Deghmoum 90+3'	Report		Stadium: Borg El Arab Stadium; Referee: Mohamed Adel

1 December 2022 5	Zamalek	2–2	Al Masry	Borg El Arab
19:00 EST (UTC+2)	Ashour 20'; El Sisi 56'	Report	Deghmoum 36'; El Sheikh 60'	Stadium: Borg El Arab Stadium; Referee: Amin Omar

6 December 2022 6	Al Masry	0–0	National Bank	Borg El Arab
14:45 EST (UTC+2)		Report		Stadium: Borg El Arab Stadium; Referee: Nader Kamar

11 December 2022 4	Tala'ea El Gaish	3–1	Al Masry	Suez
17:00 EST (UTC+2)	Kamar 43'; Tarek 45+1'; Shehata 82'	Report	Grendo 61'	Stadium: Suez Stadium; Referee: Mahmoud Nagi

16 December 2022 7	Haras El Hodoud	0–0	Al Masry	Suez
14:45 EST (UTC+2)		Report		Stadium: Suez Stadium; Referee: Wael Farhan

21 December 2022 8	Al Masry	2–2	Al Mokawloon Al Arab	Suez
17:00 EST (UTC+2)	Etouga 42'; Jelassi 71' (pen.)	Report	Salem 2'; Khaled 49'	Stadium: Suez Stadium; Referee: Mohamed El Atabani

25 December 2022 9	Ismaily	0–1	Al Masry	Borg El Arab
14:45 EST (UTC+2)	El Wahsh (yellow card) 85'; Morsi (yellow card) 87'; Shabrawy (yellow card) 90+2'	Report	Grendo 8'; Abou Slemma (yellow card) 31' (yellow-red card) 70'; Eze (yellow card) 36'; Deghmoum (yellow card) 52'; Boubekeur (yellow card) 53'; Jelassi (yellow card) 59'	Stadium: Borg El Arab Stadium; Referee: Mohamed Al Kalawy

29 December 2022 10	Al Masry	1–2	Aswan	Suez
17:00 EST (UTC+2)	Jelassi 6' (pen.); Etouga (yellow card) 51'; Boubekeur (yellow card) 64'; Moussa (yellow card) 90+2'	Report	Belhadji (penalty missed) 35'; Salah 39'; Evouna (yellow card) 90+2', (goal) 90+10' (pen.)	Stadium: Suez Stadium; Referee: Tarek Magdy

2 January 2023 11	El Dakhleya	0–1	Al Masry	Suez
14:45 EST (UTC+2)		Report	Hamdy 38'; Shahdad (yellow card) 44'	Stadium: Suez Stadium; Referee: Nader Kamar

7 January 2023 12	Al Masry	2–1	Al Ittihad	Borg El Arab
19:00 EST (UTC+2)	Jelassi 44' (pen.); Hamdi 74', (yellow card) 86'; Ali (yellow card) 77'; Deghmoum (yellow card) 90+4'	Report	Naseeb 59'; Amutu (yellow card) 54'	Stadium: Borg El Arab Stadium; Referee: Mohamed Maarouf

12 January 2023 13	Al Ahly	0–0	Al Masry	Borg El Arab
19:00 EST (UTC+2)	Hussein (yellow card) 90+4'; Metwalli (yellow card) 90+8'	Report	El Sayed (yellow card) 84'; Eze (yellow card) 90+5'	Stadium: Borg El Arab Stadium; Referee: Walid Abdelrazek

20 January 2023 14	Al Masry	1–1	Ghazl El Mahalla	Borg El Arab
17:00 EST (UTC+2)	El Sayed (yellow card) 38'; Grendo 49'; Deghmoum (yellow card) 67'; Moussa (yellow card) 77'	Report	Bazoka (yellow card) 41'; El Henawy (yellow card) 55'; El Sheikh 78' (pen.)	Stadium: Borg El Arab Stadium; Referee: Mohammad Sabahi

24 January 2023 15	Future	1–1	Al Masry	Suez
14:45 EST (UTC+2)	Reda 49'	Report	Eze (yellow card) 42'; Hamdi 61'; El Gazzar (yellow card) 64'	Stadium: Suez Stadium; Referee: Hesham El Flal

28 January 2023 16	Al Masry	1–2	Pharco	Borg El Arab
17:00 EST (UTC+2)	Grendo (yellow card) 43'; Ateia 80'; Eze (red card) 90+2'	Report	Hamroune 1', 45+5'; Fouad (yellow card) 16'; Saeed (yellow card) 77'; El Sageery (yellow card) 79'	Stadium: Borg El Arab Stadium; Referee: Ahmed Hamdi

7 February 2023 17	Smouha	1–1	Al Masry	Alexandria
14:45 EST (UTC+2)	Essam 82'	Report	Ateia 13'	Stadium: Alexandria Stadium; Referee: Mohamed Maarouf

12 February 2023 18	Ceramica Cleopatra	3–0	Al Masry	Borg El Arab
18:00 EST (UTC+2)	Rayan 31', 49'; Kamal 75' (o.g.)	Report		Stadium: Borg El Arab Stadium; Referee: Mohamed Adel

22 February 2023 19	Al Masry	0–0	Pyramids	Borg El Arab
19:00 EST (UTC+2)		Report		Stadium: Borg El Arab Stadium; Referee: Wael Farhan

28 February 2023 20	ENPPI	1–2	Al Masry	Borg El Arab
17:00 EST (UTC+2)	Amin 82'	Report	Hamdy 31'; Kamal 50'	Stadium: Borg El Arab Stadium; Referee: Mohamed Al Kalawy

6 March 2023 21	Al Masry	1–0	Tala'ea El Gaish	Borg El Arab
17:00 EST (UTC+2)	Yehia 64'	Report		Stadium: Borg El Arab Stadium; Referee: Abdel Kader Yehia

4 April 2023 22	Al Masry	3–2	Zamalek	Borg El Arab
21:15 EST (UTC+2)	Grendo 25'; Abou Slemma 60'; Yehia 87'	Report	Boubekeur 1' (o.g.); Mansi 21'	Stadium: Borg El Arab Stadium; Referee: Mahmoud Nagi
Note: The game, which was initially slated for 15 March 2023, was postponed.

7 April 2023 24	Al Masry	1–0	Haras El Hodoud	Borg El Arab
21:15 EST (UTC+2)	El Saadawy 63'	Report		Stadium: Borg El Arab Stadium; Referee: Mahmoud Ashour

13 April 2023 25	Al Mokawloon Al Arab	0–0	Al Masry	Borg El Arab
21:15 EST (UTC+2)		Report		Stadium: Borg El Arab Stadium; Referee: Ahmed Gamal

20 April 2023 26	Al Masry	1–2	Ismaily	Borg El Arab
21:15 EST (UTC+2)		Report		Stadium: Borg El Arab Stadium; Referee: Nader Kamar

25 April 2023 23	National Bank	0–0	Al Masry	Cairo
18:00 EST (UTC+2)		Report		Stadium: Police Academy Stadium; Referee: Amin Omar
Note: The game, which was initially slated for 2 April 2023, was postponed.

3 May 2023 27	Aswan	3–1	Al Masry	Aswan
19:00 EST (UTC+2)	Zaky 20' (pen.), 38'; El Sayed 45+4'	Report	Grendo 14' (pen.)	Stadium: Aswan Stadium; Referee: Ibrahim Nour El Din
Note: The game, which was initially slated for 26 April 2023, was postponed.

15 May 2023 28	Al Masry	1–1	El Dakhleya	Borg El Arab
19:00 EST (UTC+2)	Grendo 45'	Report	Fekri 90+7' (pen.)	Stadium: Borg El Arab Stadium; Referee: Mohamed El Hanafi

22 May 2023 29	Al Ittihad	1–2	Al Masry	Borg El Arab
19:00 EST (UTC+3)	Mabululu 25'	Report	Grendo 34' (pen.); Jelassi 73' (pen.)	Stadium: Borg El Arab Stadium; Referee: Mohamed Al Ghazi

7 June 2023 31	Ghazl El Mahalla	1–1	Al Masry	El Mahalla El Kubra
19:00 EST (UTC+3)	Al Aash 25'	Report	Grendo 69' (pen.)	Stadium: Ghazl El Mahalla Stadium; Referee: Ahmed Gamal

28 June 2023 32	Al Masry	2–0	Future	Alexandria
19:00 EST (UTC+2)		Report		Stadium: Borg El Arab Stadium; Referee: Mohamed Maarouf

9 July 2023 33	Pharco	0–3	Al Masry	Alexandria
20:30 EST (UTC+3)		Report		Stadium: Borg El Arab Stadium; Referee: Mohamed El Atabani

15 July 2023 34	Al Masry	0–1	Smouha	Alexandria
19:00 EST (UTC+2)		Report	Abdel Halim 31'	Stadium: Borg El Arab Stadium; Referee: Atef Hussein

26 July 2023 30	Al Masry	0–0	Al Ahly	Alexandria
20:30 EST (UTC+2)				Stadium: Borg El Arab Stadium

=== Egypt Cup ===
8 May 2023 Round of 32	Al Masry	3–1	Petrol Asyut	Alexandria
21:00 EST (UTC+2)	Ateia 34'; Omran 38', 89'	Report	Sabry 4'	Stadium: Borg El Arab Stadium; Referee: Amr Al-Shennawy

6 July 2023 (Note: The Al Masry v Haras El Hodoud match, originally scheduled to be played between 22 and 24 June 2023, was postponed to avoid scheduling conflicts with Haras El Hodoud's fixtures in the 2022–23 Egyptian Premier League.) Round of 16	Al Masry	3–2 (a.e.t.)	Haras El Hodoud	Alexandria
20:30 EST (UTC+3)	Yehia 46'; Jelassi 90' (pen.); Etouga 114'	Report	Valentine 36'; David 59'	Stadium: Borg El Arab Stadium; Referee: Ahmed Hamdy

3 August 2023 (Note: The Al Ahly v Al Masry match, originally scheduled to be played on 3 or 4 July 2023, was postponed as both participating teams in the match were not determined yet by the time of the fixture.) Quarter-finals	Al Ahly	2–1 (a.e.t.)	Al Masry	Alexandria
18:00 EST (UTC+3)	Maâloul 90+10' (pen.); Kendouci 108'	Report	Hamdy 90+5'	Stadium: Borg El Arab Stadium; Referee: Abdel Aziz El Sayed

=== EFA Cup ===
27 March 2023 Round of 16	Al Ahly	w/o	Al Masry	Borg El Arab
21:15 EST (UTC+2)				Stadium: Borg El Arab Stadium
Note: Al Ahly withdrew due to fixture congestion after their request for postponement was rejected.

29 April 2023 Quarter-finals	Al Masry	2–0	Ismaily	Borg El Arab
19:00 EST (UTC+2)	Omran 8'; Yehia 73'			Stadium: Borg El Arab Stadium; Referee: Khaled El Ghandour

24 June 2023 Semi-finals	Al Masry	0–0 (3–1 p)	Future	Alexandria
21:30 EST (UTC+3)				Stadium: Borg El Arab Stadium

22 July 2023 Final	Al Masry	1–4	Ceramica Cleopatra	Alexandria
20:30 EST (UTC+3)	Greisha 54'	Report	Antar 6'; Mohsen 11'; Shokry 61'; Amadi 89'	Stadium: Borg El Arab Stadium; Attendance: 15,000; Referee: Ibrahim Nour El Din

== Goalscorers ==
Updated as of 3 August 2023.

Rank	Pos.	No.	Player	Premier League	Cup	League Cup	Total
1	FW	21	(Egypt) Mohamed Grendo	9	0	0	9
2	FW	19	(Egypt) Marwan Hamdy	6	1	0	7
3	DF	14	(Tunisia) Elyes Jelassi	5	1	0	6
Total				34	6	3	43
