= 2018–19 El Dakhleya SC season =

El Dakhleya
2018–19 season
- President: Adel Refaat
- Manager: Alaa Abdel Aal (until 12 May); Diaa Abdel Samad (from 13 May)
- Stadium: Police Academy Stadium
- Egyptian Premier League: 17th
- Egypt Cup: Round of 32
- Top goalscorer: League: Hossam Salama (12 goals); All: Hossam Salama (12 goals)
Home colours	Away colours	Third colours

The 2018–19 El Dakhleya season was the 14th season in the football club's history and 6th consecutive and overall season in the top flight of Egyptian football, the Egyptian Premier League, having been promoted from the Egyptian Second Division in 2011. In addition to the domestic league, El Dakhleya also competed in this season's edition of the domestic cup, the Egypt Cup. The season covered a period from 1 July 2018 to 30 June 2019.

== Kit information ==
Supplier: Kone

Home	Home alt.	Away	Away alt.	Third	Fourth	Goalkeeper 1	Goalkeeper 2

== Players ==
=== Current squad ===
As of 1 February 2019

Note: Flags indicate national team as defined under FIFA eligibility rules; some limited exceptions apply. Players may hold more than one non-FIFA nationality.

No.	Pos.	Nation	Player
1	GK	EGY	Mohamed Sobhy
3	MF	EGY	Karim Khamis
4	DF	EGY	Mahmoud Shedid
5	MF	EGY	Mahmoud El Kout (on loan from Al Masry)
6	DF	EGY	Rashad Farouk (Captain)
7	MF	EGY	Abdel Aziz El Sayed
8	MF	EGY	Haggag Oweis (on loan from Al Masry)
9	FW	EGY	Mohamed Salem
10	MF	EGY	Mohamed Gamal
11	DF	EGY	Mostafa Kalosha
12	FW	EGY	Ibrahim Abou El Yazid
13	FW	EGY	Hossam Salama (Vice-captain; on loan from Zamalek)
14	MF	EGY	Mostafa Ezz El Din
15	DF	EGY	Ahmed Gouda (on loan from Al Masry)
16	FW	EGY	Ahmed Bahbah
17	MF	EGY	Said Mourad
18	DF	EGY	Samir Fekri

No.	Pos.	Nation	Player
19	FW	EGY	Ahmed Abdallah
21	MF	RWA	Kevin Muhire (on loan from Misr Lel Makkasa)
22	FW	EGY	Islam Gaber (on loan from Misr Lel Makkasa)
23	DF	EGY	Mohamed Abou Seria
24	MF	EGY	Ahmed Said Ouka
25	MF	NGR	Emmanuel Agbettor (3rd captain)
31	FW	EGY	Mahmoud El Sayed
32	MF	EGY	Omar Gabr
33	GK	EGY	Shehab El Din Khaled
34	MF	EGY	Mohamed Makhlouf (on loan from Zamalek)
35	DF	EGY	Ahmed Refaie
36	MF	NGR	Anousa Isha
37	FW	EGY	Hamoudi Sheta
44	FW	EGY	Hossam Grisha
70	MF	EGY	Ashraf Magdy
77	FW	NGR	Yaro Zakari
-	FW	EGY	Fathy Osman

== Transfers ==
=== Transfers in ===
#	Position	Player	Transferred from	Fee	Date	Source
12	FW	(Egypt) Ibrahim Abou El Yazid	(Egypt) Sidi Salem	E£500k	30 May 2018	
24	MF	(Egypt) Ahmed Said Ouka	(Egypt) El Raja	Free transfer	15 June 2018	
5	MF	(Egypt) Bassam Maher	(Egypt) ENPPI	Free transfer	30 June 2018	
44	FW	(Egypt) Hossam Grisha	(Egypt) Bahtim	E£130k	2 July 2018	
1	GK	(Egypt) Mohamed Sobhy	(Egypt) Misr Lel Makkasa	Free transfer	5 July 2018	
9	FW	(Egypt) Hussein Ragab	(Egypt) Misr Lel Makkasa	Free transfer	12 July 2018	
25	MF	(Nigeria) Emmanuel Agbettor	(Libya) Al Ahli Tripoli	Free transfer	12 July 2018	
4	DF	(Egypt) Mahmoud Sherida	(Egypt) Al Aluminium	Undisclosed	30 July 2018	
17	MF	(Egypt) Said Mourad	(Egypt) Haras El Hodoud	Undisclosed	15 December 2018	
3	MF	(Egypt) Karim Khamis	(Egypt) Kafr El Sheikh	E£500k	15 December 2018	
18	DF	(Egypt) Samir Fekri	(Egypt) ENPPI	Undisclosed	19 December 2018	
77	FW	(Nigeria) Yaro Zakari	Unknown	Undisclosed	1 January 2019	
36	MF	(Nigeria) Anousa Isha	Unknown	Free transfer	12 January 2019	
23	DF	(Egypt) Mohamed Abou Seria	(Egypt) El Gouna	E£450k	13 January 2019	
9	FW	(Egypt) Mohamed Salem	(Egypt) Petrojet	Free transfer	26 January 2019	
7	MF	(Egypt) Abdel Aziz El Sayed	(Egypt) Petrojet	Free transfer	30 January 2019	

==== Loans in ====
#	Position	Player	Loaned from	Date	Loan expires	Source
22	FW	(Egypt) Islam Gaber	(Egypt) Misr Lel Makkasa	12 July 2018	30 June 2019	
13	FW	(Egypt) Hossam Salama	(Egypt) Zamalek	30 July 2018	30 June 2019	
34	MF	(Egypt) Mohamed Makhlouf	(Egypt) Zamalek	31 July 2018	30 June 2019	
5	MF	(Egypt) Mahmoud El Kout	(Egypt) Al Masry	10 January 2019	30 June 2019	
8	MF	(Egypt) Haggag Oweis	(Egypt) Al Masry	13 January 2019	30 June 2019	
	FW	(Egypt) Fathy Osman	(Egypt) Tala'ea El Gaish	16 January 2019	30 June 2019	
15	DF	(Egypt) Ahmed Gouda	(Egypt) Al Masry	30 January 2019	30 June 2019	
21	MF	(Rwanda) Kevin Muhire	(Egypt) Misr Lel Makkasa	31 January 2019	30 June 2019	

=== Transfers out ===
Position	Player	Transferred to	Fee	Date	Source
GK	(Egypt) Mahmoud El Gharabawy	(Egypt) Al Ittihad	Free transfer	2 May 2018	
DF	(Egypt) Ahmed Alaa	(Egypt) Al Ahly	Undisclosed	10 May 2018	
DF	(Egypt) Mahmoud Mansour	(Egypt) Smouha	Undisclosed	20 May 2018	
MF	(Egypt) Khaled Lotfi	(Egypt) Ceramica Cleopatra	Undisclosed	26 May 2018	
FW	(Egypt) Nasser Mansi	(Egypt) Pyramids	Undisclosed	26 June 2018	
MF	(Egypt) Mohamed Sherif	(Egypt) Al Merreikh	Free transfer	27 June 2018	
DF	(Egypt) Amir Abed	(Egypt) Smouha	Undisclosed	28 June 2018	
FW	(Egypt) Abdel Rahman El Sewisi	Released		30 June 2018	
GK	(Egypt) Amir Abdel Hamid	Retired		30 June 2018	
DF	(Egypt) Ahmed Samir Farag	Retired		30 June 2018	
FW	(Egypt) Ahmed Mostafa	(Egypt) Petrojet	End of loan spell	30 June 2018	
FW	(Egypt) Abdel Aziz El Shaer	(Egypt) Al Mokawloon Al Arab	End of loan spell	30 June 2018	
DF	(Egypt) Gehad Genedi	(Egypt) Haras El Hodoud	Undisclosed	3 July 2018	
FW	(Nigeria) Uche Ihuarulam	(Egypt) Ghazl El Mahalla	Free transfer	11 July 2018	
MF	(Egypt) Mohamed Gabal	(Egypt) Baladeyet El Mahalla	Free transfer	12 July 2018	
FW	(Gabon) Cédric Ondo Biyoghé	(Morocco) Olympic de Safi	Free transfer	18 July 2018	
MF	(Egypt) Bassam Maher	(Egypt) Ghazl El Mahalla	Free transfer	24 December 2018	
DF	(Egypt) Ahmed Saber	(Egypt) ENPPI	Undisclosed	24 December 2018	
GK	(Egypt) Mohamed Fathy	(Egypt) Smouha	Free transfer	26 December 2018	
DF	(Egypt) Mahmoud Sherida	(Egypt) Baladeyet El Mahalla	Undisclosed	30 December 2018	
FW	(Egypt) Ahmed Hassan	(Egypt) Wadi Degla	Undisclosed	2 January 2019	
MF	(Burkina Faso) Saïdou Simporé	(Egypt) Al Masry	Undisclosed	6 January 2019	
FW	(Egypt) Hussein Ragab	(Egypt) Al Masry	E£3m	7 January 2019	
FW	(Egypt) Mohamed Zeka	(Egypt) Ghazl El Mahalla	Free transfer	27 January 2019	

== Friendly matches ==
Win Draw Loss

24 July 2018	Misr Lel Makkasa (Egypt)	2–1	(Egypt) El Dakhleya	Ismailia, Egypt
15:30 CAT (UTC+2)	Wahid (??); Antwi (??)	Report	?? (??)	Stadium: Ismailia Stadium

7 August 2018	Zamalek (Egypt)	7–0	(Egypt) El Dakhleya	Giza, Egypt
15:00 CAT (UTC+2)	Said 7', 47', 50'; Ibrahim 11' (pen.); Antar 39', 81'; Madbouly 90+2'	Report		Stadium: Abdel Latif Abou Regelah Stadium

27 August 2018	El Dakhleya (Egypt)	1–3	(Egypt) Tala'ea El Gaish	Alexandria, Egypt
16:00 CAT (UTC+2)	?? (??)	Report	Moamen (??); I. Youssef (??); H. Youssef (??)	Stadium: Borg El Arab Stadium

13 October 2018	El Entag El Harby (Egypt)	2–1	(Egypt) El Dakhleya	Cairo, Egypt
15:00 CAT (UTC+2)	Owoboskini (??); Okuruket (??)	Report	Salama (??)	Stadium: War Factories Stadium

28 October 2018	El Dakhleya (Egypt)	5–3	(Egypt) El Entag El Harby	Cairo, Egypt
15:00 CAT (UTC+2)	?? (??); ?? (??); ?? (??); ?? (??); ?? (??)	Report	?? (??); ?? (??); ?? (??)	Stadium: Police Academy Stadium

16 February 2019	El Dakhleya (Egypt)	7–0	(Egypt) Al Nasr	Cairo, Egypt
16:00 CAT (UTC+2)	?? (??); ?? (??); ?? (??); ?? (??); ?? (??); ?? (??); ?? (??)	Report		Stadium: 30 June Stadium

== Competitions ==
=== Overview ===
Competition	First match	Last match	Starting round	Final position	Record							
Competition	First match	Last match	Starting round	Final position	Pld	W	D	L	GF	GA	GD	Win %
Egyptian Premier League	1 August 2018	27 May 2019	Matchday 1	17th	34	4	15	15	34	52	−18	11.76
Egypt Cup	11 October 2018	11 October 2018	Round of 32	Round of 32	1	0	1	0	0	0	+0	0.00
Total					35	4	16	15	34	52	−18	11.43

Source: Competitions

=== Egyptian Premier League ===
==== League table ====
Pos	Team	Pld	W	D	L	GF	GA	GD	Pts	Qualification or relegation
14	El Gouna	34	8	14	12	38	52	−14	38 (Note: Head-to-head points: Smouha 10, El Entag El Harby 8, El Gouna 7, Haras El Hodoud 5.)	
15	Haras El Hodoud	34	8	14	12	30	37	−7	38	
16	Petrojet (R)	34	8	11	15	30	43	−13	35	Relegation to the Second Division
17	El Dakhleya (R)	34	4	15	15	34	52	−18	27	Relegation to the Second Division
18	Nogoom (R)	34	5	11	18	30	46	−16	26	Relegation to the Second Division

Source: Soccerway
Rules for classification: 1) Points; 2) Head-to-Head points; 3) Head-to-Head goal difference; 4) Head-to-Head goals scored; 5) Head-to-Head away goals scored; 6) Goal difference; 7) Goals scored (Note: Head-to-head record is used only after all the matches between the teams in question have been played).
(R) Relegated

==== Results summary ====
Overall								Home						Away					
Pld	W	D	L	GF	GA	GD	Pts	W	D	L	GF	GA	GD	W	D	L	GF	GA	GD
34	4	15	15	34	52	−18	27	2	6	9	13	24	−11	2	9	6	21	28	−7

Source: Soccerway

==== Results by round ====
Round	1	2	3	4	5	6	7	8	9	10	11	12	13	14	15	16	17	18	19	20	21	22	23	24	25	26	27	28	29	30	31	32	33	34
Ground	H	A	H	A	A	H	A	H	A	H	A	H	A	H	A	H	A	A	H	A	H	H	A	H	A	H	A	H	A	H	A	H	A	H
Result	D	W	L	L	L	D	D	W	W	L	D	W	D	L	L	D	D	D	L	D	L	D	L	L	D	D	D	D	L	L	D	L	L	L
Position	9	4	9	14	16	16	16	12	8	10	9	6	6	9	12	11	13	11	12	14	14	14	14	16	16	16	16	17	17	17	17	17	17	17

Source: Soccerway
A = Away; H = Home; W = Win; D = Draw; L = Loss

==== Matches ====
1 August 2018 1	El Dakhleya	1–1	Wadi Degla	Cairo
16:00 CAT (UTC+2)	Ragab 36'	Report	Ndiaye 38' (pen.)	Stadium: Police Academy Stadium; Referee: Mohamed Abou Khater

6 August 2018 2	Haras El Hodoud	1–2	El Dakhleya	Alexandria
16:30 CAT (UTC+2)	Gamal 15' (pen.)	Report	Awad 81' (o.g.); Salama 90+5'	Stadium: Haras El Hodoud Stadium; Referee: Mahmoud Nagy

14 August 2018 3	El Dakhleya	0–1	El Entag El Harby	Cairo
16:00 CAT (UTC+2)		Report	Annan 43'	Stadium: Police Academy Stadium; Referee: Said Hamza

26 August 2018 4	Pyramids	3–1	El Dakhleya	Cairo
18:15 CAT (UTC+2)	Keno 28'; Gabr 87'; Magdy 90+6'	Report	Gaber 51'	Stadium: 30 June Stadium; Referee: Mohamed El Hanafy

31 August 2018 5	El Gouna	3–2	El Dakhleya	El Gouna
21:00 CAT (UTC+2)	Roshdi 6'; Gedo 11'; Wael 39'	Report	Gaber 18'; Panom 41' (o.g.)	Stadium: El Gouna Stadium; Referee: Mahmoud Nagy

17 September 2018 7	Petrojet	1–1	El Dakhleya	Suez
18:00 CAT (UTC+2)	Bekele 45' (pen.)	Report	Salama 38'	Stadium: Suez Stadium; Referee: Ahmed Hamdy

21 September 2018 8	El Dakhleya	3–0	Al Ittihad	Cairo
15:30 CAT (UTC+2)	Salama 23', 40'; Ouka 54'	Report		Stadium: Police Academy Stadium; Referee: Mohamed Youssef

30 September 2018 9	Misr Lel Makkasa	0–1	El Dakhleya	Cairo (Note: Misr Lel Makkasa v El Dakhleya match was played at Osman Ahmed Osman Stadium in Cairo instead of Faiyum Stadium in Faiyum due to pitch status.)
21:00 CAT (UTC+2)		Report	Salama 39'	Stadium: Osman Ahmed Osman Stadium; Referee: Mabrouk Nabil

5 October 2018 10	El Dakhleya	1–2	Nogoom	Cairo
15:00 CAT (UTC+2)	Salama 77'	Report	Sherweda 40'; El Sayed 82'	Stadium: Police Academy Stadium; Referee: Ahmed El Adawy

19 October 2018 11	ENPPI	1–1	El Dakhleya	Cairo
21:00 CAT (UTC+2)	H. Fathy 36'	Report	Ragab 5'	Stadium: Petro Sport Stadium; Referee: Walid Abdel Razek

2 November 2018 12	El Dakhleya	2–1	Tala'ea El Gaish	Cairo
14:45 CAT (UTC+2)	Salama 72'; Makhlouf 76'	Report	Mostafa 85'	Stadium: Police Academy Stadium; Referee: Mohamed Hassan

6 November 2018 13	Smouha	1–1	El Dakhleya	Alexandria
17:00 CAT (UTC+2)	Shilongo 33'	Report	Ouka 40'	Stadium: Borg El Arab Stadium; Referee: Mahmoud Nagy

12 November 2018 14	El Dakhleya	0–2	Al Mokawloon Al Arab	Cairo
14:45 CAT (UTC+2)		Report	Taher 38'; Hinestroza 73'	Stadium: Police Academy Stadium; Referee: Mahmoud Bassiouny

22 November 2018 15	Zamalek	2–1	El Dakhleya	Cairo
19:00 CAT (UTC+2)	Kahraba 10', 89'	Report	Ouka 3'	Stadium: Petro Sport Stadium; Referee: Mohamed El Hanafy

10 December 2018 17	Al Masry	1–1	El Dakhleya	Ismailia (Note: Al Masry v El Dakhleya match was played at Suez Canal Stadium in Ismailia instead of Al Masry Club Stadium in Port Said due to security concerns.)
17:00 CAT (UTC+2)	Grendo 86'	Report	Salama 39' (pen.)	Stadium: Suez Canal Stadium; Referee: Ibrahim Nour El Din

20 December 2018 18	Wadi Degla	2–2	El Dakhleya	Cairo
19:00 CAT (UTC+2)	Ndiaye 15'; Mahmoud 31'	Report	Abou El Yazid 20'; Agbettor 44'	Stadium: Petro Sport Stadium; Referee: Hossam El Gallad

29 December 2018 (Note: El Dakhleya v Al Ahly match, originally scheduled to be played on 11 September 2018, was postponed due to conflicting with Horoya v Al Ahly match in the CAF Champions League, which was set to be played on 14 September 2018. The match was later rescheduled to be played on 29 December 2018.) 6	El Dakhleya	2–2	Al Ahly	Cairo
18:00 CAT (UTC+2)	Salama 56'; Ragab 81'	Report	El Sheikh 49'; Ashraf 90+5'	Stadium: Petro Sport Stadium (Note: El Dakhleya v Al Ahly match was played at Petro Sport Stadium instead of Police Academy Stadium due to security concerns.); Referee: Amin Omar

5 January 2019 (Note: El Dakhleya v Ismaily match, originally scheduled to be played on 27 November 2018, was postponed due to conflicting with Le Messager Ngozi v Ismaily match in the CAF Champions League, which was set to be played on 28 November 2018. The match was later rescheduled to be played on 5 January 2019.) 16	El Dakhleya	0–0	Ismaily	Cairo
14:30 CAT (UTC+2)		Report		Stadium: Police Academy Stadium; Referee: Mahmoud Nagy

14 January 2019 19	El Dakhleya	0–1	Haras El Hodoud	Cairo
14:30 CAT (UTC+2)		Report	Ashour 90+4'	Stadium: Police Academy Stadium; Referee: Ibrahim Mahgoub

23 January 2019 20	El Entag El Harby	2–2	El Dakhleya	Cairo
20:00 CAT (UTC+2)	El Henawy 18' (pen.); Diawara 64'	Report	Gaber 45+1'; Salama 76'	Stadium: Al Salam Stadium; Referee: Mahmoud El Banna

4 February 2019 21	El Dakhleya	0–2	Pyramids	Cairo
19:30 CAT (UTC+2)		Report	Kharbin 90+1' (pen.); Benavente 90+5'	Stadium: Police Academy Stadium; Referee: Youssef Essrayri (Tunisia)

14 February 2019 22	El Dakhleya	2–2	El Gouna	Cairo
14:30 CAT (UTC+2)	Bahbah 22'; Salama 80' (pen.)	Report	Rayyan 20'; Tawfik 45'	Stadium: Police Academy Stadium; Referee: Mahmoud Bassiouny

20 February 2019 23	Al Ahly	3–1	El Dakhleya	Cairo
20:00 CAT (UTC+2)	Hany 20'; Ajayi 38'; Geraldo 90'	Report	Ouka 73' (pen.)	Stadium: Petro Sport Stadium; Referee: Mahmoud El Banna

25 February 2019 24	El Dakhleya	0–2	Petrojet	Cairo
15:30 CAT (UTC+2)		Report	Naguib 42'; Mao 90+5'	Stadium: Police Academy Stadium; Referee: Mohamed El Sabahy

2 March 2019 25	Al Ittihad	1–1	El Dakhleya	Alexandria
17:30 CAT (UTC+2)	Kamar 17'	Report	A. El Sayed 19'	Stadium: Borg El Arab Stadium; Referee: Mohamed Maarouf

11 March 2019 26	El Dakhleya	0–0	Misr Lel Makkasa	Cairo
15:00 CAT (UTC+2)		Report		Stadium: Police Academy Stadium; Referee: Ibrahim Nour El Din

31 March 2019 27	Nogoom	1–1	El Dakhleya	Cairo
17:00 CAT (UTC+2)	Abou El Yazid 72' (o.g.)	Report	A. El Sayed 45+3'	Stadium: Petro Sport Stadium; Referee: Mahmoud Ashour

7 April 2019 28	El Dakhleya	1–1	ENPPI	Cairo
17:30 CAT (UTC+2)	Salem 69'	Report	Refaat 37' (pen.)	Stadium: Police Academy Stadium; Referee: Mahmoud El Banna

11 April 2019 29	Tala'ea El Gaish	2–1	El Dakhleya	Cairo
17:30 CAT (UTC+2)	Mostafa 83' (pen.); Gaafar 90+2'	Report	A. El Sayed 90+5' (pen.)	Stadium: Gehaz El Reyada Stadium; Referee: Gehad Grisha

19 April 2019 30	El Dakhleya	0–2	Smouha	Cairo
20:00 CAT (UTC+2)		Report	Nsibambi 29', 90+5'	Stadium: Police Academy Stadium; Referee: Mahmoud Ashour

1 May 2019 31	Al Mokawloon Al Arab	2–2	El Dakhleya	Cairo
16:30 CAT (UTC+2)	Ali 1', 29'	Report	Salem 61'; Salama 69' (pen.)	Stadium: Osman Ahmed Osman Stadium; Referee: Ahmed El Adawy

12 May 2019 32	El Dakhleya	1–2	Zamalek	Cairo
22:00 CAT (UTC+2)	Abou El Yazid 61'	Report	Kahraba 19'; Obama 73'	Stadium: Petro Sport Stadium (Note: El Dakhleya v Zamalek match was played at Petro Sport Stadium instead of Police Academy Stadium due to security concerns.); Referee: Mohamed El Sabahy

17 May 2019 (Note: Ismaily v El Dakhleya match, originally scheduled to be played on 21 May 2019, was played on 17 May 2019 to avoid scheduling conflicts.) 33	Ismaily	2–0	El Dakhleya	Suez (Note: Ismaily v El Dakhleya match was played at the Egyptian Army Stadium in Suez instead of Ismailia Stadium in Ismailia due to maintenance.)
22:00 CAT (UTC+2)	Bambo 29'; Metwalli 50' (pen.)	Report		Stadium: Egyptian Army Stadium; Referee: Tarek Magdy

27 May 2019 34	El Dakhleya	0–3	Al Masry	Suez (Note: El Dakhleya v Al Masry match was played at the Egyptian Army Stadium in Suez instead of Police Academy Stadium in Cairo due to security concerns.)
22:00 CAT (UTC+2)		Report	Simporé 51' (pen.), 90+3'; Moussa 80'	Stadium: Egyptian Army Stadium; Referee: Wael Farhan

=== Egypt Cup ===
8 October 2018 Round of 32	El Dakhleya	0–0 (a.e.t.) (0–2 p)	El Mansoura	Cairo
15:00 CAT (UTC+2)		Report		Stadium: Police Academy Stadium; Referee: Sobhy El Amrawy
	Penalties
	Salama (penalty missed); Abou El Yazid (penalty missed); Zeka (penalty missed); Gaber (penalty missed)		(penalty missed) Osama; (penalty missed) Nagati; (penalty missed) Hassan; (penalty scored) Said; (penalty scored) Fawzy

== Statistics ==
=== Appearances and goals ===
No.	Pos	Player	Egyptian Premier League		Egypt Cup		Total	
No.	Pos	Player	Apps	Goals	Apps	Goals	Apps	Goals
1	GK	(Egypt) Mohamed Sobhy	32	0	0	0	32	0
3	MF	(Egypt) Karim Khamis	1+4	0	0	0	5	0
4	DF	(Egypt) Mahmoud Shedid	30+2	0	0	0	32	0
5	MF	(Egypt) Mahmoud El Kout	3+1	0	0	0	4	0
6	DF	(Egypt) Rashad Farouk	21+5	0	0	0	26	0
7	MF	(Egypt) Abdel Aziz El Sayed	10	3	0	0	10	3
8	DF	(Egypt) Haggag Oweis	7+2	0	0	0	9	0
9	FW	(Egypt) Mohamed Salem	5+3	2	0	0	8	2
10	MF	(Egypt) Mohamed Gamal	10+16	0	0+1	0	27	0
11	DF	(Egypt) Mostafa Kalosha	12+2	0	1	0	15	0
12	FW	(Egypt) Ibrahim Abou El Yazid	30	2	1	0	31	2
13	FW	(Egypt) Hossam Salama	24+5	12	1	0	30	12
14	MF	(Egypt) Mostafa Ezz El Din	3+6	0	1	0	10	0
15	DF	(Egypt) Ahmed Gouda	10	0	0	0	10	0
16	FW	(Egypt) Ahmed Bahbah	16+4	1	0	0	20	1
17	DF	(Egypt) Said Mourad	0+4	0	0	0	4	0
18	DF	(Egypt) Samir Fekri	7+4	0	0	0	11	0
19	FW	(Egypt) Ahmed Abdallah	0+2	0	0+1	0	3	0
21	MF	(Rwanda) Kevin Muhire	10	0	0	0	10	0
22	FW	(Egypt) Islam Gaber	23+2	3	1	0	26	3
23	DF	(Egypt) Mohamed Abou Seria	2	0	0	0	2	0
24	MF	(Egypt) Ahmed Said Ouka	15+9	4	0	0	24	4
25	MF	(Nigeria) Emmanuel Agbettor	24+1	1	1	0	26	1
31	FW	(Egypt) Mahmoud El Sayed	1+3	0	0	0	4	0
32	MF	(Egypt) Omar Gabr	1	0	0	0	1	0
33	GK	(Egypt) Shehab El Din Khaled	2	0	1	0	3	0
34	MF	(Egypt) Mohamed Makhlouf	13+4	1	0	0	17	1
35	DF	(Egypt) Ahmed Refaie	4	0	0	0	4	0
36	MF	(Nigeria) Anousa Isha	4+5	0	0	0	9	0
37	FW	(Egypt) Hamoudi Sheta	1+1	0	0	0	2	0
44	FW	(Egypt) Hossam Grisha	1	0	0	0	1	0
70	MF	(Egypt) Ashraf Magdy	0+2	0	0	0	2	0
77	FW	(Nigeria) Yaro Zakari	0+1	0	0	0	1	0
Players transferred out during the season
2	DF	(Egypt) Mahmoud Sherida	2+1	0	1	0	4	0
3	DF	(Egypt) Ahmed Saber	14+1	0	1	0	16	0
5	MF	(Egypt) Bassam Maher	3	0	0	0	3	0
8	MF	(Burkina Faso) Saïdou Simporé	16	0	0	0	16	0
9	FW	(Egypt) Hussein Ragab	14+2	3	0	0	16	3
14	FW	(Egypt) Mohamed Zeka	2+3	0	1	0	6	0
20	MF	(Brazil) John Lennon	1	0	0	0	1	0
23	GK	(Egypt) Mohamed Fathy	0	0	0	0	0	0
27	FW	(Egypt) Ahmed Hassan	0+3	0	1	0	4	0

=== Goalscorers ===
Rank	Position	Name	Egyptian Premier League	Egypt Cup	Total
1	FW	(Egypt) Hossam Salama	12	0	12
2	MF	(Egypt) Ahmed Said Ouka	4	0	4
3	MF	(Egypt) Abdel Aziz El Sayed	3	0	3
3	FW	(Egypt) Islam Gaber	3	0	3
3	FW	(Egypt) Hussein Ragab	3	0	3
6	FW	(Egypt) Ibrahim Abou El Yazid	2	0	2
6	FW	(Egypt) Mohamed Salem	2	0	2
8	MF	(Nigeria) Emmanuel Agbettor	1	0	1
8	FW	(Egypt) Ahmed Bahbah	1	0	1
8	MF	(Egypt) Mohamed Makhlouf	1	0	1
Own goal			2	0	2
Total			34	0	34

=== Clean sheets ===
Rank	Name	Egyptian Premier League	Egypt Cup	Total
1	(Egypt) Mohamed Sobhy	4	0	4
2	(Egypt) Shehab El Din Khaled	0	1	1
Total		4	1	5
