= List of Egyptian football transfers summer 2023 =

The 2023 Egyptian football summer transfer window ran from 27 July to 31 August 2023.

== Transfers ==
| Date | Name | Moving from | Moving to | Fee |
|---|---|---|---|---|
| 5 July 2023 | (Brazil) Bruno Sávio | Al Ahly | (Bolivia) Club Bolívar | Undisclosed |
| 18 July 2023 | Ayman Ashraf | Al Ahly | National Bank | Free |
| 18 July 2023 | Emam Ashour | (Denmark) FC Midtjylland | Al Ahly | €2.6M |
| 21 July 2023 | Hossam Hassan | Al Ahly | Smouha | €297k |
| 22 July 2023 | Ahmed El Sheikh | Ghazl El Mahalla | Tala'ea El Gaish | Free |
| 22 July 2023 | (Tanzania) Himid Mao | Ghazl El Mahalla | Tala'ea El Gaish | Free |
| 24 July 2023 | Mostafa Fathi | (Saudi Arabia) Al Taawoun | Pyramids | €903k |
| 25 July 2023 | Mohamed El Shamy | Ismaily | Al Masry | Free |
| 27 July 2023 | Mostafa Fawzy | Al Ahly | ZED FC | Undisclosed |
| 27 July 2023 | (Guinea) Moussa Diawara | National Bank | Tala'ea El Gaish | Free |
| 27 July 2023 | Mostafa Saad | Al Ahly | ZED FC | Undisclosed |
| 27 July 2023 | Shady Hussein | Al Ahly | ZED FC | €384K |
| 28 July 2023 | (Ivory Coast) Serge Arnaud Aka | Ismaily | National Bank | €73k |
| 28 July 2023 | Ali Lotfi | Al Ahly | ZED FC | Undisclosed |
| 30 July 2023 | Mohamed Grendo | Al Masry | National Bank | Free |
| 30 July 2023 | (Democratic Republic of the Congo) Fiston Kalala Mayele | (Tanzania) Young Africans | Pyramids | Undisclosed |
| 9 August 2023 | (Nigeria) Christopher John | El Dakhleya | (Iraq) Al-Zawraa SC | |
| 13 August 2023 | (Colombia) Luis Hinestroza | Al Mokawloon Al Arab | (Iraq) Erbil SC | Free |
| 4 August 2023 | Youssef Osama | Zamalek | Pyramids | Free |
| 14 August 2023 | Omar Fayed | Al Mokawloon Al Arab | (Turkey) Fenerbahçe | €551k |
| 14 August 2023 | Mohamed Sherif | Al Ahly | (Saudi Arabia) Al-Khaleej | Undisclosed |
| 14 August 2023 | (Ivory Coast) Soualio Ouattara | (Saudi Arabia) Al-Qadsiah | Al Ittihad | Free |
| 15 August 2023 | Mohamed Reda | Future FC | Pyramids | €1M |
| 15 August 2023 | Ahmed Eid | Zamalek | Al Masry | Free |
| 16 August 2023 | Ahmed Fawzi | Pyramids | Al Mokawloon Al Arab | Loan |
| 16 August 2023 | Emad Mayhoub | Pyramids | Al Mokawloon Al Arab | Loan |
| 16 August 2023 | Ahmed Ayman Mansour | Zamalek | Al Masry | Free |
| 17 August 2023 | Ahmed El Sheikh | (Czech Republic) FK Příbram | Al Ittihad | Free |
| 18 August 2023 | Ahmed Daador | Pyramids | Ceramica Cleopatra | Loan |
| 19 August 2023 | (Palestine) Mahmoud Wadi | Pyramids | Al Mokawloon Al Arab | Free |
| 20 August 2023 | Islam Abou Salima | Al Masry | Al Ittihad | Free |
| 21 August 2023 | (Ghana) Listowell Amankona | (Ghana) Real Tamale United | Al Masry | |
| 26 August 2023 | (Tunisia) Fakhreddine Ben Youssef | Pyramids | Al Masry | |
| 27 August 2023 | Yehia Yasser | Smouha | Olympic Club | Loan |
| 27 August 2023 | Sabri Raheel | Al Ittihad | El Gouna | Free |
| 27 August 2023 | (Algeria) Ahmed Kendouci | Al Ahly | Ceramica Cleopatra | Loan |
| 28 August 2023 | (Ivory Coast) Jean Morel Poé | Al Ittihad | (Ukraine) Kryvbas Kryvyi Rih | Free |
| 29 August 2023 | (Democratic Republic of the Congo) Walter Bwalya | Al Ahly | (Morocco) Wydad AC | Free |
