= Mohamed Sobhi =

Mohamed Sobhi may refer to:

- Mohamed Sobhi (actor), Egyptian actor
- Mohamed Sobhy (footballer, born 1981), Egyptian footballer (soccer)
- Mohamed Sobhy (footballer, born 1999), Egyptian footballer (soccer)
