= Mohamed Sobhy =

Mohamed Sobhy may refer to:

- Mohamed Sobhy (footballer, born 1981)
- Mohamed Sobhy (footballer, born 1999)
- Mohamed Sobhi (footballer), born 1992, player for Al-Shamal SC

== See also ==
- Mohamed Sobhi (actor), Egyptian actor
