= Mostafa Kalosha =

Association football player (born 1989)

Personal information
- Full name: Mostafa Ali Mostafa
- Date of birth: 12 July 1989 (age 37)
- Place of birth: Egypt
- Position: Left-back

Team information
- Current team: Masr
- Number: 13

Senior career*
Years	Team	Apps	(Gls)
2011–2014	Al Aluminium		
2014–2015	El Minya		
2015–2016	Ghazl El Mahalla	28	(1)
2016–2017	Al Ittihad	14	(0)
2017–2018	Al Assiouty Sport	1	(0)
2018–2019	El Dakhleya	18	(0)
2019–	Masr	6	(0)
- * Club domestic league appearances and goals as of 21:51, 30 November 2019 (UTC)

Mostafa Ali (Arabic: مصطفى علي; born 12 July 1989), commonly known as Mostafa Kalosha (Arabic: مصطفى كالوشا), is an Egyptian footballer who plays for Egyptian Premier League side ZED FC as a left-back.

Kalosha joined Al Ittihad from Ghazl El Mahalla in 2015 for 400,000 Egyptian pounds. In 2017, he signed a 2-year contract for Al Assiouty Sport on a free transfer.

In September 2017, Egyptian Football Association suspended Kalosha for 6 months because he had signed for two different clubs at the same time, El Dakhleya and Al Assiouty. El Dakhleya later withdrew their complaint after Al Assiouty paid 100,000 Egyptian pounds as a compensation.
