= Rafik Kabou =

Tunisian footballer (born 1992)

Personal information
- Date of birth: 28 October 1992 (age 34)
- Place of birth: Tunisia
- Height: 1.65 m (5 ft 5 in)
- Position: Striker

Team information
- Current team: ENPPI
- Number: 27

Senior career*
Years	Team	Apps	(Gls)
2012–2013	Sfaxien	7	(0)
2015–2016	Ben Guerdane	4	(0)
2017–2019	Monastir	51	(13)
2019–2022	Wadi Degla	29	(7)
2020–2021	→ Smouha (loan)	28	(2)
2022–	ENPPI	89	(11)
- * Club domestic league appearances and goals as of 16 August 2025

Rafik Kabou (Arabic: رفيق كابو; born 28 October 1992) is a Tunisian footballer who plays as a striker for Egyptian Premier League side ENPPI.

== Club career ==
On 1 October 2022, Kabou signed a three-year contract with ENPPI. His debut came against Pyramids, where he scored in a 1–1 tie.
