= Allan Kyambadde =

Ugandan footballer (born 1996)

Personal information
- Date of birth: 15 January 1996 (age 30)
- Place of birth: Kampala, Uganda
- Height: 1.79 m (5 ft 10 in)
- Position: Midfielder

Team information
- Current team: El Dhakeleya
- Number: 20

Senior career*
Years	Team	Apps	(Gls)
2012–2014	Express FC		
2014–2016	Vipers		
2016–2017	Express FC		
2017–2018	SC Villa		
2018–2019	KCCA FC		
2019–2022	El Gouna	58	(0)
2022–	El Dhakeleya	21	(2)

International career^{‡}
2014–	Uganda	22	(1)
- * Club domestic league appearances and goals as of 10:20, 10 May 2023 (UTC) ‡ National team caps and goals as of 18:47, 30 April 2020 (UTC)

Allan Kyambadde (born 15 January 1996) is a Ugandan professional footballer who plays as a midfielder for El Dhakeleya in the Egyptian Premier League.

== Club career ==
In August 2019, Kyambadde joined Egyptian Premier League side El Gouna FC from Kampala Capital City Authority FC.

== International career ==
In January 2014, coach Milutin Sedrojevic, invited Kyambadde to be a part of the Uganda national team squad for the 2014 African Nations Championship. The team placed third in the group stage of the competition after beating Burkina Faso, drawing with Zimbabwe and losing to Morocco.

== Career statistics ==
As of matches played on 12 August 2019

Appearances and goals by national team and year
National team	Year	Apps	Goals
Uganda	2014	2	0
Uganda	2015	0	0
Uganda	2016	0	0
Uganda	2017	4	0
Uganda	2018	5	0
Uganda	2019	7	0
Total		18	0

Scores and results list Uganda's goal tally first, score column indicates score after each Kyambadde goal.

List of international goals scored by Allan Kyambadde
No.	Date	Venue	Opponent	Score	Result	Competition
1	3 August 2019	Phillip Omondi Stadium, Kampala, Uganda	Somalia	2–0	4–1	2020 African Nations Championship qualification
