= Christopher John (footballer) =

Nigerian footballer

Personal information
- Date of birth: 2 December 2003 (age 22)
- Place of birth: Warri, Nigeria
- Height: 1.75 m (5 ft 9 in)
- Position: Winger

Team information
- Current team: Al-Arabi
- Number: 11

Youth career
- 2015-2022: Wikki Tourists

Senior career*
| Years | Team | Apps | (Gls) |
| 2021–2022 | Wikki Tourists | 11 | (4) |
| 2022–2023 | El Dakhleya | 22 | (1) |
| 2023–2024 | Al-Zawraa | 24 | (7) |
| 2024–2025 | Al-Mesaimeer | 5 | (2) |
| 2025– | Al-Arabi | 10 | (4) |
| 2026 | → Erbil (loan) | | |
- * Club domestic league appearances and goals as of 3 May 2025

Christopher John (born 2 December 2003) is a Nigerian professional footballer who plays as a winger for Al-Arabi.

== Career ==
Christopher signed with El Dakhleya in 2022, where he played one season before moving to Al-Zawraa in September 2023 At the end of the season he was released, and signed with Al-Mesaimeer. After 5 months during the stoppage period due to the 26th Arabian Gulf Cup he had trials with Al-Arabi and signed during the winter transfers. in the winter transfers in January 2026 he was loaned to Erbil on a 6-month deal.

== Career statistics ==
As of 21 May 2025

Appearances and goals by club, season and competition
| Club | Season | League | | | Cup | | Continental | | Other (Note: All appearance(s) in Egyptian League Cup, Kuwait Crown Prince Cup, Kuwait Super Cup) | | Total | |
| Club | Season | Division | Apps | Goals | Apps | Goals | Apps | Goals | Apps | Goals | Apps | Goals |
|---|---|---|---|---|---|---|---|---|---|---|---|---|
| Wikki Tourists | 2021-22 | Nigeria Premier League | 11 | 4 | 1 | 0 | — | | 0 | 0 | 12 | 4 |
| El Dakhleya | 2022-23 | Egyptian Premier League | 22 | 1 | 2 | 0 | — | | 2 | 0 | 26 | 1 |
| Al-Zawraa | 2023–24 | Iraq Stars League | 24 | 7 | 3 | 0 | 6 (Note: All appearance(s) in AFC Cup) | 2 | 0 | 0 | 33 | 9 |
| Al-Mesaimeer | 2024–25 | Qatari Second Division | 5 | 2 | 1 | 0 | — | | 0 | 0 | 6 | 2 |
| Al-Arabi | 2024–25 | Kuwaiti Premier League | 10 | 4 | 3 | 1 | 4 (Note: All appearance(s) in AFC Challenge League) | 1 | 4 | 1 | 21 | 7 |
| Al-Arabi | 2025-26 | Kuwaiti Premier League | 11 | 2 | 1 | 0 | 4 (Note: All appearance(s) in AFC Challenge League) | 1 | 3 | 1 | 19 | 4 |
| Career total | | | 83 | 20 | 9 | 1 | 14 | 4 | 3 | 2 | 128 | 27 |
