= Elyes Jelassi =

Tunisian footballer

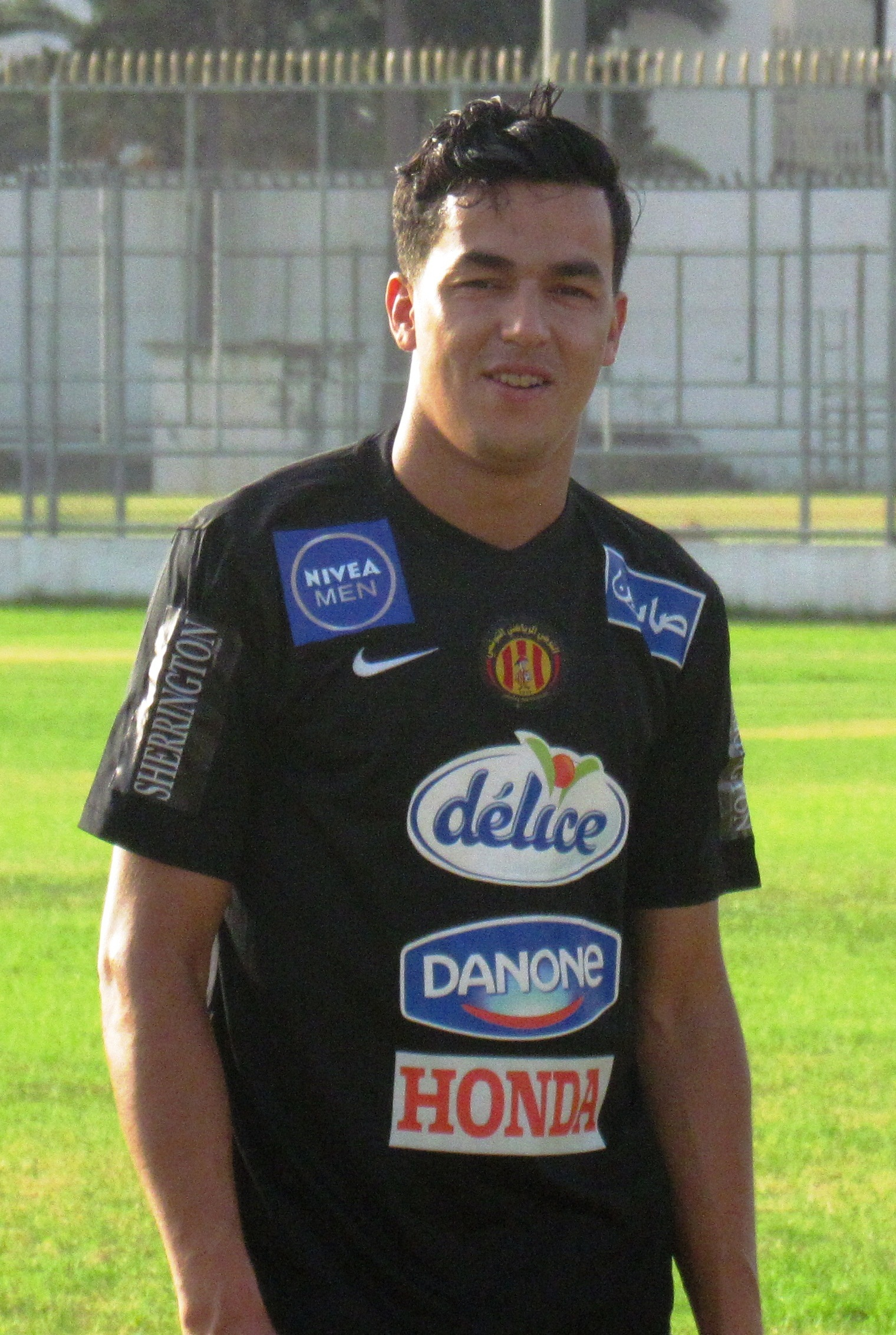

Personal information
- Date of birth: 7 February 1994 (age 32)
- Place of birth: El Batan, Tunisia
- Height: 1.77 m (5 ft 10 in)
- Position: Midfielder

Team information
- Current team: Al Ahly Benghazi
- Number: 14

Senior career*
Years	Team	Apps	(Gls)
2013–2015	Stade Tunisien	50	(3)
2015–2017	Espérance	18	(1)
2017–2019	Stade Tunisien	30	(2)
2019–2021	US Monastir	58	(10)
2021–24	Al Masry SC	56	(10)
2023–25	Al-Ahly SC (Benghazi)	0	(0)
2025–	Stade Tunisien	0	(0)

International career
2015–	Tunisia	2	(0)
- * Club domestic league appearances and goals

Elyes Jelassi (born 7 February 1994) is a Tunisian footballer who plays as a midfielder for Libyan Premier League club Al Ahly Benghazi.
