= Ahmed Soliman (footballer) =

Egyptian footballer

Personal information
- Full name: Ahmed Mahmoud Soliman

International career
Years	Team	Apps	(Gls)
- Egypt

Ahmed Mahmoud Soliman (Arabic: أَحْمَد مَحْمُود سُلَيْمَان) was an Egyptian footballer. He competed in the men's tournament at the 1928 Summer Olympics. Soliman is deceased.
