= Mahmoud Ezzat (footballer) =

Egyptian footballer (born 1992)

Personal information
- Full name: Mahmoud Ezzat
- Date of birth: May 5, 1992 (age 34)
- Place of birth: Cairo, Egypt
- Height: 1.89 m (6 ft 2 in)
- Position: Center back

Team information
- Current team: El Dakhleya SC
- Number: 6

Youth career
- Arab Contractors SC

Senior career*
Years	Team	Apps	(Gls)
2010–2015	Arab Contractors SC	51	(4)
2014	→ CD Nacional (loan)	4	(0)
2015–	Smouha	31	(4)

International career^{‡}
2011	Egypt U20	4	(0)
2017–	Egypt	2	(0)
- * Club domestic league appearances and goals as of 7 December 2016 ‡ National team caps and goals as of 4 September 2018

Mahmoud Ezzat (Arabic: محمود عزت; born 5 May 1992) is an Egyptian football player who currently plays as a center back for El Dakhelya SC and the Egyptian national team. He was called for the national team under Shawky Gharib on 4 June 2014 in a friendly game against Jamaica.

Additionally Ezzat use to play for C.D. Nacional in the Primeira Liga.
