= Ahmed Shahdad =

Qatari footballer (born 1982)

Personal information
- Full name: Ahmed Mohammed Shahdad
- Date of birth: 1 January 1982 (age 44)
- Place of birth: Qatar
- Position: Defender

Senior career*
Years	Team	Apps	(Gls)
2001–2010	Al-Ahli		
2010–2016	Al-Arabi		
2016–2017	Muaither	14	(0)
- * Club domestic league appearances and goals

Ahmed Shahdad (Arabic:أحمد شهداد) (born 1 January 1982) is a Qatari footballer.
