= Ahmed Youssef =

Egyptian footballer (born 1999)

Personal information
- Date of birth: January 1, 1999 (age 27)
- Place of birth: Egypt
- Position: Midfielder

Team information
- Current team: ENPPI
- Number: 33

Senior career*
| Years | Team | Apps | (Gls) |
| 2015–2016 | Ghazl El Mahalla | 6 | (0) |
| 2016– | ENPPI | 9 | (0) |
| 2019– | → Masr (loan) | 9 | (0) |
- * Club domestic league appearances and goals as of 06 August 2017

Ahmed Youssef (Arabic: أحمد يوسف; born January 1, 1999) is an Egyptian professional footballer who plays as a midfielder for Enppi. He joined Enppi in 2016 from Ghazl El Mahalla.
