= Hussein Ragab =

Egyptian footballer (born 1993)

Personal information
- Full name: Hussein Ragab Abdel Mohsen Ali
- Date of birth: 1 January 1993 (age 33)
- Place of birth: Egypt
- Position: Second striker

Team information
- Current team: Al-Jazeera
- Number: 18

Youth career
- Kafr El Sheikh

Senior career*
Years	Team	Apps	(Gls)
2013–2014	Kafr El Sheikh		
2014–2018	Misr Lel Makkasa	25	(4)
2018	→ ENPPI (loan)	3	(0)
2018–2019	El Dakhleya	16	(3)
2019–2022	Al Masry	41	(4)
2022–2023	El Dakhleya	15	(0)
2023–2025	Qanah		
2025–2026	Baladiyat El Mahalla		
2026–	Al-Jazeera	2	(1)

International career
2015	Egypt U-23	3	(0)
- * Club domestic league appearances and goals as of 30 January 2026

Hussein Ragab (Arabic: حسين رجب; born 1 January 1993), is an Egyptian footballer who plays for Jordanian Pro League side Al-Jazeera as a second striker.

Ragab represented the Egyptian national U-23 team during the 2015 Africa U-23 Cup of Nations.
