= Momen Atef =

Egyptian footballer (born 1994)

Personal information
- Date of birth: November 12, 1994 (age 32)
- Position: Right back

Team information
- Current team: Al Nasr

Youth career
- Wadi Degla

Senior career*
Years	Team	Apps	(Gls)
–2016	Wadi Degla		
2015–2016	→Aswan (loan)	4	(1)
2016–2017	Aswan	1	(0)
2017–	Al Nasr		
- * Club domestic league appearances and goals as of 10 September 2017

Momen Atef (Arabic: مؤمن عاطف; born November 12, 1994) is an Egyptian professional footballer who plays as a right back for the Egyptian club El Dhakleya SC. After his loan to Aswan ended, he signed a 2-year contract with Aswan SC.
