= Mohamed Sobhy (footballer, born 1981) =

Egyptian footballer (born 1981)

Personal information
- Full name: Mohamed Yasser Mansour Sobhy Eleywa
- Date of birth: 30 August 1981 (age 45)
- Place of birth: Tell El Kebir, Ismailia, Egypt
- Height: 1.76 m (5 ft 9 in)
- Position: Goalkeeper

Youth career
- Ismaily

Senior career*
Years	Team	Apps	(Gls)
2001–2014	Ismaily	400	(0)
2014–2015	Smouha	17	(0)
2015–2017	Ismaily	11	(0)
2017–2018	Misr Lel Makkasa	2	(0)
2018–2020	El Dakhleya	13	(0)
2020–2021	Ismaily	8	(0)

International career
2001–2002	Egypt U20		
2007–2014	Egypt	6	(0)
- * Club domestic league appearances and goals as of 18:58, 22 November 2018 (UTC)

Mohamed Sobhy (Arabic: محمد صبحي; born 30 August 1981), is an Egyptian footballer who plays for Egyptian Premier League side Ismaily SC as a goalkeeper.

Sobhy was a key member of the Egyptian U20 team which won the third place in the 2001 FIFA World Youth Championship in Argentina. Sobhy was also a member of the Egyptian senior team squad which won and the 2008 Africa Cup of Nations in Ghana.

== Honours ==
Egypt

- Africa Cup of Nations: 2008
