= Mostafa Fawzy =

Egyptian footballer (born 1999)

Personal information
- Date of birth: 5 October 1999 (age 27)
- Height: 1.88 m (6 ft 2 in)
- Position: Forward

Team information
- Current team: El Dakhleya (on loan from Al Ahly)

Youth career
- –2021: Al Ahly

Senior career*
Years	Team	Apps	(Gls)
2021–	Al Ahly	0	(0)
2021–2022	→ Viktoria Žižkov (loan)	6	(0)
2022–	→ El Dakhleya (loan)	0	(0)
- * Club domestic league appearances and goals as of 23:14, 25 February 2022 (UTC)

Mostafa Fawzy (Arabic: مصطفي فوزي; born 5 October 1999) is an Egyptian professional footballer who plays as a forward for El Dakhleya on loan from Al Ahly.

== Personal life ==
Fawzy is the brother of fellow professional footballer Mohamed Fawzy.

== Career statistics ==
=== Club ===
As of 25 February 2022.

Club	Season	League			Cup		Continental		Other		Total	
Club	Season	Division	Apps	Goals	Apps	Goals	Apps	Goals	Apps	Goals	Apps	Goals
Al Ahly	2021–22	Egyptian Premier League	0	0	0	0	0	0	0	0	0	0
Al Ahly	Total		0	0	0	0	0	0	0	0	0	0
Viktoria Žižkov (loan)	2021–22	Fortuna národní liga	6	0	2 (Note: Appearances in the Czech Cup)	3	–		0	0	8	3
Viktoria Žižkov (loan)	Total		6	0	2	3	0	0	0	0	8	3
El Dakhleya (loan)	2022–23	Egyptian Premier League	0	0	0	0	–				0	0
El Dakhleya (loan)	Total		0	0	0	0	–				0	0
