= Mohamed Reda (footballer) =

Egyptian footballer (born 2000)

Personal information
- Full name: Mohamed Reda Mohamed Abouelfetouh
- Date of birth: 10 November 2000 (age 26)
- Position: Midfielder

Team information
- Current team: Ceramica Cleopatra FC
- Number: 77

Youth career
- –2018: Wadi Degla

Senior career*
Years	Team	Apps	(Gls)
2017–2022	Wadi Degla	82	(1)
2021–2022	→ Future (loan)	28	(5)
2022–2023	Future	29	(4)
2023–2026	Pyramids	22	(1)
2025	Ceramica Cleopatra FC	11	(4)
2026-	Ceramica Cleopatra FC	1	(0)

International career^{‡}
2023–	Egypt	1	(0)
- * Club domestic league appearances and goals as of 21 February 2026 ‡ National team caps and goals as of 12 September 2023

Mohamed Reda Mohamed Abouelfetouh (Arabic: مُحَمَّد رِضَا مُحَمَّد أَبُو الْفُتُوح; born 10 November 2000), known as Bobo, is an Egyptian footballer who plays as a midfielder for Egyptian Premier League club Ceramica Cleopatra FC and the Egypt national team.

== Career ==
On 3 October 2021, he moved on loan with a buy-option to newly promoted Future. Future activated the option in June 2022. At the end of the 2022–23 season, Reda joined Pyramids.

== Honours ==
Future

- EFA Cup: 2022

Pyramids

- Egypt Cup: 2023–24
- CAF Champions League: 2024–25
- CAF Super Cup: 2025
- FIFA African–Asian–Pacific Cup: 2025
