= Borg El Arab =

Borg El Arab برج العرب
- City
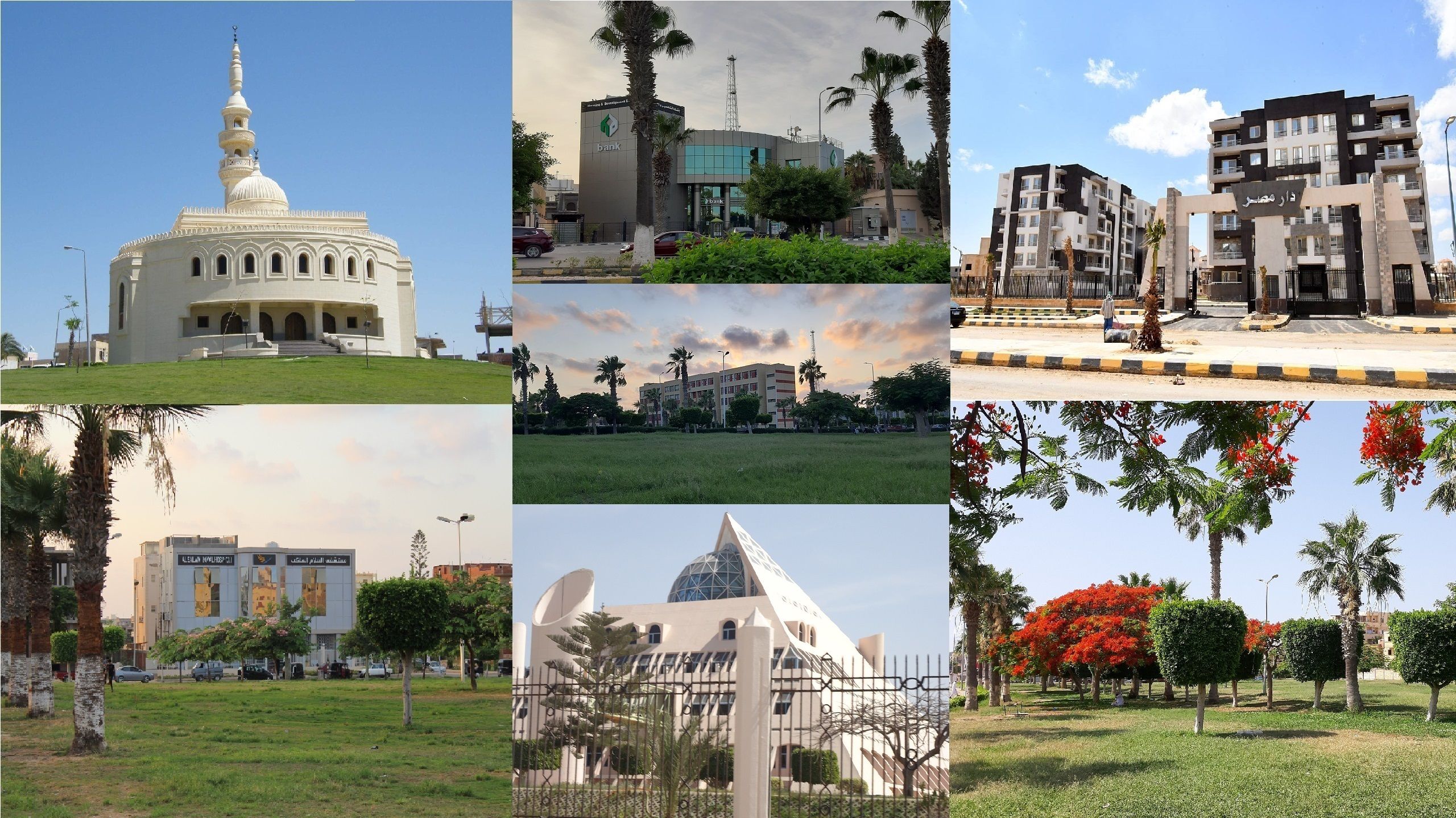

- Location in Egypt
- Coordinates: 30°50′56″N 29°36′42″E
- Country: Egypt
- Governorate: Alexandria
- Markaz: Borg El Arab

Area
  - Total: 312.8 km^{2} (120.8 sq mi)
- Elevation: 65 m (213 ft)

Population (2023)
  - Total: 134,265
  - Density: 429.2/km^{2} (1,112/sq mi)
- Time zone: UTC+2 (EET)
  - Summer (DST): UTC+3 (EEST)

Borg El Arab (Arabic: برج العرب, romanized: Burg al-ʿArab, lit. 'Tower of the Arabs') is a city in the governorate of Alexandria, Egypt. and the capital of Borg El Arab Markaz. It is located about 52 kilometers south-west of Alexandria and some seven kilometers from the Mediterranean coast. North of Borg El Arab is the King Maryut resort and Lake Maryut. South of Borg El Arab is New Borg El Arab City. The city has an airport, Borg El Arab Airport, that serves nearly 250,000 passengers every year. Borg El Arab is widely considered an extension of the city of Alexandria.

On 23 April 1973 Egyptian President Anwar Sadat met with Syrian president Hafez al-Assad at the presidential resort in Borg El Arab for two days of detailed discussions in preparation for the joint offensive on Israel which launched the Yom Kippur War. President Hosni Mubarak performed the formal inauguration of the city in November 1988. The city is home for the biggest football stadium in Egypt, Borg El Arab stadium.

== See also ==
- New Borg El Arab
