= Mohamed Grendo =

Egyptian footballer (born 1991)

Personal information
- Full name: Mohamed Abdel Latif
- Date of birth: 7 August 1991 (age 35)
- Place of birth: Aswan, Egypt
- Position: Forward

Team information
- Current team: National Bank of Egypt
- Number: 28

Youth career
- Ismaily
- Tersana

Senior career*
Years	Team	Apps	(Gls)
2013–2014	Al-Saqr		
2014–2016	Hetten		
2016–2017	FC Masr		
2017–2023	Al Masry	99	(19)
2019–2020	→ Haras El Hodoud (loan)	30	(4)
2023–	National Bank of Egypt	23	(3)

International career
- Egypt B
- * Club domestic league appearances and goals as of 28 June 2024

Mohamed Abdel Latif (Arabic: مُحَمَّد عَبْد اللَّطِيف; born 7 August 1991), better known as Grendo (Arabic: جريندو), is an Egyptian footballer who plays as a forward for Egyptian Premier League side National Bank of Egypt.

== Club career ==
On 12 September 2019, he was loaned to Haras El Hodoud on a season-long loan deal.

On 30 July 2023, he signed a three-season contract with National Bank SC as a free agent.

== Honours ==
Al-Saqr

- Yemeni League: 2013–14
- Yemeni President Cup: 2013–14
