= El Dakhleya SC =

Association football club in Cairo, Egypt

El Dakhleya
- Full name: El Dakhleya Sporting Club
- Founded: 2005; 21 years ago
- Ground: Police Academy Stadium
- Capacity: 12,000
- Chairman: Adel Refaat
- League: Egyptian Premier League
- 2022–23: 15th

El Dakhleya Sporting Club (Arabic: نادي الداخلية الرياضي) is an Egyptian sports club based in Abbassia, Cairo. The club is mainly known for its football team, which currently plays in the Egyptian Premier League, the top tier in the Egyptian football league system.

The club was promoted to the Egyptian Premier League for the first time in their history during the 2010–11 season of the Egyptian Second Division, after finishing first in their group. They remained in the league until they were relegated in 2019. They were promoted to the Egyptian Premier League once again in the 2021–22 season.

== Current squad ==
As of 7 January 2023

Note: Flags indicate national team as defined under FIFA eligibility rules; some limited exceptions apply. Players may hold more than one non-FIFA nationality.

No.	Pos.	Nation	Player
1	GK	EGY	Mohamed Magdy Abdelfattah
3	DF	EGY	Barakat Haggag
5	DF	EGY	Mahmoud Ezzat
7	MF	EGY	Abdelaziz El Sayed
8	MF	EGY	Samir Fekri
9	MF	EGY	Hussein Ragab
11	MF	EGY	Mohab Yasser
12	MF	NGA	Christopher John
14	DF	EGY	Momen Atef
15	FW	EGY	Mostafa Fawzy
16	GK	EGY	Reda Sayed
17	MF	EGY	Mahmoud Talaat
19	MF	EGY	Mohamed Nosseir
23	DF	EGY	Mohamed Naguib
25	MF	NGA	Kelechi Chimezie
26	DF	EGY	Ahmed El Amour

No.	Pos.	Nation	Player
29	MF	NGA	Rasheed Ahmed
30	FW	EGY	Hesham Sabry
35	MF	NGA	Funom Alfred
37	FW	EGY	Essa Abdallah
66	DF	EGY	Ahmed Abdel Naby
—	GK	EGY	Ahmed Soliman
—	DF	EGY	Ahmed Rifai
—	DF	EGY	Mahmoud Mansour
—	DF	EGY	Mahmoud Shedid Kenawi
—	DF	EGY	Mido El Nagar
—	MF	EGY	Ahmed Refo
—	MF	UGA	Allan Kyambadde
—	MF	CIV	Eric Serge
—	FW	NGA	Abdullahi Ojifinni
—	FW	EGY	Salah El Deen Yehia
