= 2018–19 El Gouna FC season =

El Gouna
2018–19 season
- Owner: Samih Sawiris
- President: Nader Shawky
- Manager: Hesham Zakaria (until 27 November); Hamada Sedki (until 9 June); Reda Shehata (caretaker, from 19 July)
- Stadium: El Gouna Stadium
- Egyptian Premier League: 14th
- Egypt Cup: Round of 32
- Top goalscorer: League: Ahmed Yasser Rayyan (7 goals); All: Ahmed Yasser Rayyan (7 goals)
Home colours	Away colours

The 2018–19 El Gouna season was the 16th season in the football club's history and 5th season in the top flight of Egyptian football, the Egyptian Premier League, having been promoted from the Egyptian Second Division in the previous season. In addition to the domestic league, El Gouna also competed in this season's editions of the domestic cup, the Egypt Cup. The season covered a period from 1 July 2018 to 30 June 2019.

== Kit information ==
Supplier: Adidas
Sponsor: Orascom

Home	Home alt.	Away	Away alt.	Goalkeeper 1	Goalkeeper 2	Goalkeeper 3

== Players ==
=== Current squad ===
As of 1 February 2019

Note: Flags indicate national team as defined under FIFA eligibility rules; some limited exceptions apply. Players may hold more than one non-FIFA nationality.

No.	Pos.	Nation	Player
1	GK	EGY	Mahmoud El Gharabawy
2	DF	EGY	Islam Gaber (on loan from Al Ahly U-23)
3	DF	EGY	Khaled Sobhy
4	DF	EGY	Ahmed Said (Captain)
5	DF	EGY	Louay Wael
7	FW	EGY	Mahmoud Shabrawy
8	FW	SEN	Ousseynou Boye
9	FW	EGY	Ahmed Hassan Mekky (on loan from Smouha)
10	FW	EGY	Islam Roshdi
11	DF	EGY	Hossam Zein
12	DF	EGY	Ahmed Ali
13	DF	CMR	Jonathan Ngwem
14	MF	EGY	Ahmed Eid
15	FW	EGY	Mohamed Nagy (Vice-captain)
16	MF	EGY	Sherif Dabo (on loan from Pyramids)
17	FW	EGY	Mohamed Nadi

No.	Pos.	Nation	Player
18	MF	EGY	Ahmed Magdy
19	FW	EGY	Mohamed Abdel Gawad
20	FW	EGY	Ahmed El Alfi (on loan from Al Ittihad)
22	MF	EGY	Mohamed Mohsen Leila
23	GK	EGY	Haitham Mohamed
25	MF	ETH	Gatoch Panom
27	FW	EGY	Islam Abdel Naim (on loan from Tala'ea El Gaish)
28	MF	CIV	Serge Aka
29	FW	EGY	Salah Khattab
31	MF	EGY	Akram Tawfik (on loan from Al Ahly)
33	DF	EGY	Amr Saadawy (on loan from Al Ahly)
34	MF	EGY	Ahmed Abaza (on loan from Zamalek U-23)
39	FW	EGY	Ahmed Yasser Rayyan (on loan from Al Ahly)
42	DF	EGY	Mahmoud El Gazzar (on loan from Al Ahly)
70	MF	EGY	Ahmed Hamdy (on loan from Al Ahly)
99	GK	EGY	Omar Radwan (on loan from Al Ahly)

=== Out on loan ===
Note: Flags indicate national team as defined under FIFA eligibility rules; some limited exceptions apply. Players may hold more than one non-FIFA nationality.

No. / Pos. / Nation / Player; — / FW / NGR / Chisom Chikatara (at Tala'ea El Gaish until 30 June 2019)	No. / Pos. / Nation / Player; — / DF / EGY / Karim Salem (at El Shams until 30 June 2019)

== Transfers ==
=== Transfers in ===
==== Loans in ====
#	Position	Player	Loaned from	Date	Loan expires	Source
45	FW	(Egypt) Fady Farid	(Egypt) Al Ahly U-23	1 July 2018	31 January 2019	
99	GK	(Egypt) Omar Radwan	(Egypt) Al Ahly	9 July 2018	30 June 2019	
33	DF	(Egypt) Amr Saadawy	(Egypt) Al Ahly	9 July 2018	30 June 2019	
34	MF	(Egypt) Ahmed Abaza	(Egypt) Zamalek U-23	31 July 2018	30 June 2019	
70	MF	(Egypt) Ahmed Hamdy	(Egypt) Al Ahly	2 January 2019	30 June 2019	
39	FW	(Egypt) Ahmed Yasser Rayyan	(Egypt) Al Ahly	2 January 2019	30 June 2019	
9	FW	(Egypt) Ahmed Hassan Mekky	(Egypt) Smouha	10 January 2019	30 June 2019	
42	DF	(Egypt) Mahmoud El Gazzar	(Egypt) Al Ahly	14 January 2019	30 June 2019	
20	FW	(Egypt) Ahmed El Alfi	(Egypt) Al Ittihad	17 January 2019	30 June 2019	
27	MF	(Egypt) Islam Abdel Naim	(Egypt) Tala'ea El Gaish	18 January 2019	30 June 2019	
31	MF	(Egypt) Akram Tawfik	(Egypt) Al Ahly	28 January 2019	30 June 2019	
2	DF	(Egypt) Islam Gaber	(Egypt) Al Ahly U-23	28 January 2019	30 June 2019	
16	MF	(Egypt) Sherif Dabo	(Egypt) Pyramids	31 January 2019	30 June 2019	

=== Transfers out ===
==== Loans out ====
Position	Player	Loaned to	Date	Loan expires	Source
DF	(Egypt) Karim Salem	(Egypt) El Shams	13 January 2019	30 June 2019	
FW	(Nigeria) Chisom Chikatara	(Egypt) Tala'ea El Gaish	18 January 2019	30 June 2019	

== Friendly matches ==
Win Draw Loss

8 July 2018	El Gouna (Egypt)	3–1	(Egypt) Al Aluminium	El Gouna, Egypt
16:30 CAT (UTC+2)	Gedo (??); Coulibaly (??); Ngwem (??)	Report	?? (??)	Stadium: El Gouna Stadium

10 July 2018	El Gouna (Egypt)	4–1	(Egypt) Muslim Youths (Qena)	El Gouna, Egypt
15:00 CAT (UTC+2)	Magdy (??); Coulibaly (??); Roshdi (??)	Report	?? (??)	Stadium: El Gouna Stadium

16 July 2018	El Gouna (Egypt)	1–1	(Egypt) Nogoom El Mostakbal	El Gouna, Egypt
15:00 CAT (UTC+2)	Magdy 54'	Report	El Sisi 90+4' (pen.)	Stadium: El Gouna Stadium

19 July 2018	Al Ahly (Egypt)	0–0	(Egypt) El Gouna	Cairo, Egypt
15:30 CAT (UTC+2)		Report		Stadium: Mokhtar El Tetsh Stadium

24 July 2018	Zamalek (Egypt)	2–2	(Egypt) El Gouna	Cairo, Egypt
14:30 CAT (UTC+2)	Kasongo 45+1'; Ahaddad 80'	Report	Coulibaly 70'; Shabrawy 83'	Stadium: Cairo International Stadium subfield

10 August 2018	El Gouna (Egypt)	4–0	(Egypt) Senzo	El Gouna, Egypt
19:30 CAT (UTC+2)	Nadi (??); Shabrawy (??); Saadawy (??)	Report		Stadium: El Gouna Stadium

18 August 2018	El Gouna (Egypt)	2–0	(Egypt) Senzo	El Gouna, Egypt
16:30 CAT (UTC+2)	?? (??); Roshdi (??)	Report		Stadium: El Gouna Stadium

7 September 2018	El Gouna (Egypt)	6–0	(Egypt) Ras Gharib	El Gouna, Egypt
19:00 CAT (UTC+2)	Coulibaly (??); Abou Seria (??); Khattab (??); Chikatara (??); Nadi (??)	Report		Stadium: El Gouna Stadium

17 September 2018	El Gouna (Egypt)	2–4	(Libya) Al Ahli Tripoli	Cairo, Egypt
17:00 CAT (UTC+2)	Shabrawy (??); Okka (??)	Report	?? (??); ?? (??); ?? (??); ?? (??)	Stadium: 30 June Stadium subfield

14 December 2018	El Gouna (Egypt)	9–2	(Egypt) MS Safaga	El Gouna, Egypt
13:00 CAT (UTC+2)	Chikatara (??); Gedo (??); Roshdi (??); Ngwem (??); Farid (??); Abou Seria (??)	Report	?? (??); ?? (??)	Stadium: El Gouna Stadium

15 December 2018	El Gouna (Egypt)	1–0	(Egypt) Senzo	El Gouna, Egypt
10:00 CAT (UTC+2)	?? (??)	Report		Stadium: El Gouna Stadium

13 January 2019	El Gouna (Egypt)	3–1	(Hungary) Kisvárda	El Gouna, Egypt
20:00 CAT (UTC+2)	?? (??); ?? (??); ?? (??)	Report	?? (??)	Stadium: El Gouna Stadium

16 January 2019	Al Ahly U-21 (Egypt)	1–1	(Egypt) El Gouna	Cairo, Egypt
15:00 CAT (UTC+2)	Yehia 12'	Report	Roshdi 60'	Stadium: Al Ahly Club Stadium - Nasr City

7 March 2019	El Gouna (Egypt)	5–1	(Switzerland) FC Muri	El Gouna, Egypt
15:00 CAT (UTC+2)	Boye (??); Eid (??); Sobhy (??); Abdel Gawad (??)	Report	?? (??)	Stadium: El Gouna Stadium

21 March 2019	El Gouna (Egypt)	3–1	(Egypt) Al Aluminium	El Gouna, Egypt
15:00 CAT (UTC+2)	Okka (??); Gedo (??); Eid (??)	Report	?? (??)	Stadium: El Gouna Stadium

== Competitions ==
Win Draw Loss

=== Overview ===
Competition	First match	Last match	Starting round	Final position	Record							
Competition	First match	Last match	Starting round	Final position	Pld	W	D	L	GF	GA	GD	Win %
Egyptian Premier League	2 August 2018	21 July 2019	Matchday 1	14th	34	8	14	12	38	52	−14	23.53
Egypt Cup	10 October 2018	10 October 2018	Round of 32	Round of 32	1	0	0	1	1	4	−3	0.00
Total					35	8	14	13	39	56	−17	22.86

Source: Competitions

=== Egyptian Premier League ===
==== League table ====
Pos	Team	Pld	W	D	L	GF	GA	GD	Pts	Qualification or relegation
12	Smouha	34	8	14	12	33	41	−8	38 (Note: Head-to-head points: Smouha 10, El Entag El Harby 8, El Gouna 7, Haras El Hodoud 5.)	
13	El Entag El Harby	34	8	14	12	36	44	−8	38	
14	El Gouna	34	8	14	12	38	52	−14	38	
15	Haras El Hodoud	34	8	14	12	30	37	−7	38	
16	Petrojet (R)	34	8	11	15	30	43	−13	35	Relegation to the Second Division

Source: Soccerway
Rules for classification: 1) Points; 2) Head-to-Head points; 3) Head-to-Head goal difference; 4) Head-to-Head goals scored; 5) Head-to-Head away goals scored; 6) Goal difference; 7) Goals scored (Note: Head-to-head record is used only after all the matches between the teams in question have been played).
(R) Relegated

==== Results summary ====
Overall								Home						Away					
Pld	W	D	L	GF	GA	GD	Pts	W	D	L	GF	GA	GD	W	D	L	GF	GA	GD
34	8	14	12	38	52	−14	38	4	7	6	20	24	−4	4	7	6	18	28	−10

Source: Soccerway

==== Results by round ====
Round	1	2	3	4	5	6	7	8	9	10	11	12	13	14	15	16	17	18	19	20	21	22	23	24	25	26	27	28	29	30	31	32	33	34
Ground	H	A	H	A	H	A	A	A	A	H	A	H	A	H	A	A	A	A	H	A	H	A	H	H	H	H	A	H	A	H	A	H	H	H
Result	L	W	D	D	W	D	L	W	L	D	D	D	L	D	L	L	D	W	L	W	L	D	W	L	W	L	D	D	L	W	D	L	D	D
Position	18	9	7	8	6	5	7	6	6	7	6	7	9	8	9	15	14	16	15	12	12	13	10	10	8	10	11	10	11	9	9	13	14	14

Source: Soccerway
A = Away; H = Home; W = Win; D = Draw; L = Loss

==== Matches ====
2 August 2018 1	El Gouna	0–1	Al Masry	Alexandria (Note: El Gouna v Al Masry match was played at Borg El Arab Stadium in Alexandria instead of El Gouna Stadium in El Gouna due to security concerns.)
18:00 CAT (UTC+2)		Report	Koffi 66'	Stadium: Borg El Arab Stadium; Referee: Mohamed Maarouf

6 August 2018 2	Wadi Degla	1–3	El Gouna	Cairo
21:00 CAT (UTC+2)	Azab 90+1'	Report	Roshdi 33'; Shabrawy 53', 76'	Stadium: Cairo Military Academy Stadium; Referee: Mahmoud Bassiouny

14 August 2018 3	El Gouna	1–1	Haras El Hodoud	El Gouna
18:15 CAT (UTC+2)	Roshdi 24'	Report	El Shebini 84'	Stadium: El Gouna Stadium; Referee: Wael Farhan

26 August 2018 4	El Entag El Harby	0–0	El Gouna	Cairo
21:00 CAT (UTC+2)		Report		Stadium: Al Salam Stadium; Referee: Mahmoud Wafa

31 August 2018 5	El Gouna	3–2	El Dakhleya	El Gouna
21:00 CAT (UTC+2)	Roshdi 6'; Gedo 11'; Wael 39'	Report	Gaber 18'; Panom 41' (o.g.)	Stadium: El Gouna Stadium; Referee: Mahmoud Nagy

12 September 2018 6	Pyramids	1–1	El Gouna	Cairo
21:00 CAT (UTC+2)	Keno 90+6'	Report	Okka 57'	Stadium: 30 June Stadium; Referee: Abdel Aziz El Sayed

22 September 2018 8	Petrojet	1–2	El Gouna	Suez
15:30 CAT (UTC+2)	Bekele 90'	Report	Roshdi 19'; Eid 45+4' (pen.)	Stadium: Suez Stadium; Referee: Tarek Magdy

2 October 2018 9	Al Ittihad	2–1	El Gouna	Alexandria
17:30 CAT (UTC+2)	El Deeb 37'; Gedo 90+3'	Report	Ali 90'	Stadium: Alexandria Stadium; Referee: Mahmoud El Banna

6 October 2018 10	El Gouna	0–0	Misr Lel Makkasa	El Gouna
18:00 CAT (UTC+2)		Report		Stadium: El Gouna Stadium; Referee: Mahmoud Ashour

18 October 2018 11	Nogoom	0–0	El Gouna	Cairo
18:00 CAT (UTC+2)		Report		Stadium: Petro Sport Stadium; Referee: Mahmoud Bassiouny

2 November 2018 12	El Gouna	1–1	ENPPI	El Gouna
15:30 CAT (UTC+2)	Okka 15' (pen.)	Report	E. Fathy 40'	Stadium: El Gouna Stadium; Referee: Said Hamza

6 November 2018 13	Tala'ea El Gaish	5–0	El Gouna	Cairo
17:00 CAT (UTC+2)	Mostafa 2', 33'; Kabouria 22', 47', 50'	Report		Stadium: Gehaz El Reyada Stadium; Referee: Mohamed Adel

10 November 2018 14	El Gouna	1–1	Smouha	El Gouna
20:30 CAT (UTC+2)	Magdy 45'	Report	Moaz 71'	Stadium: El Gouna Stadium; Referee: Ahmed El Ghandour

20 November 2018 15	Al Mokawloon Al Arab	4–2	El Gouna	Cairo
14:45 CAT (UTC+2)	El Shimi 16'; Ali 65'; Adel 78'; Samir 87' (pen.)	Report	Roshdi 52'; Chikatara 74'	Stadium: Osman Ahmed Osman Stadium; Referee: Ahmed El Adawy

26 November 2018 16	Zamalek	3–0	El Gouna	Cairo
20:00 CAT (UTC+2)	Sassi 49'; El Said 68'; Kahraba 71'	Report		Stadium: Petro Sport Stadium; Referee: Ibrahim Nour El Din

5 December 2018 (Note: Al Ahly v El Gouna match, originally scheduled to be played on 17 September 2018, was postponed due to conflicting with Horoya v Al Ahly match in the CAF Champions League, which was set to be played on 14 September 2018. The match was later rescheduled to be played on 5 December 2018.) 7	Al Ahly	2–1	El Gouna	Cairo
20:00 CAT (UTC+2)	El Sheikh 68'; Ali 79' (o.g.)	Report	Nadi 13'	Stadium: Al Salam Stadium; Referee: Mohamed Adel

26 December 2018 (Note: El Gouna v Wadi Degla match, originally scheduled to be played on 14 January 2019, was played on 26 December 2018 to avoid scheduling conflicts.) 19	El Gouna	0–2	Wadi Degla	El Gouna
17:00 CAT (UTC+2)		Report	Helal 79'; Mahmoud 83' (pen.)	Stadium: El Gouna Stadium; Referee: Mohamed El Tabei

3 January 2019 (Note: Al Masry v El Gouna match, originally scheduled to be played on 21 December 2018, was postponed due to conflicting with Salitas v Al Masry match in the CAF Confederation Cup, which was set to be played on 22 December 2018. The match was later rescheduled to be played on 3 January 2019.) 18	Al Masry	0–2	El Gouna	Ismailia (Note: Al Masry v El Gouna match was played at Ismailia Stadium in Ismailia instead of Al Masry Club Stadium in Port Said due to security concerns.)
19:00 CAT (UTC+2)		Report	Roshdi 9'; Wael 26'	Stadium: Ismailia Stadium; Referee: Ahmed El Adawy

23 January 2019 20	Haras El Hodoud	1–2	El Gouna	Alexandria
15:00 CAT (UTC+2)	Koné 46'	Report	Panom 36'; Mekky 52'	Stadium: Haras El Hodoud Stadium; Referee: Mohamed Adel

7 February 2019 21	El Gouna	2–3	El Entag El Harby	El Gouna
16:00 CAT (UTC+2)	Rayyan 45+3'; Hamdy 47'	Report	Owoboskini 2'; Kabonga 19'; Farouk 38'	Stadium: El Gouna Stadium; Referee: Mohamed Salama

14 February 2019 22	El Dakhleya	2–2	El Gouna	Cairo
14:30 CAT (UTC+2)	Bahbah 22'; Salama 80' (pen.)	Report	Rayyan 20'; Tawfik 45'	Stadium: Police Academy Stadium; Referee: Mahmoud Bassiouny

19 February 2019 23	El Gouna	2–1	Pyramids	El Gouna
16:00 CAT (UTC+2)	Abdel Naim 51'; Rayyan 60'	Report	El Said 77'	Stadium: El Gouna Stadium; Referee: Fran Jović (Croatia)

24 February 2019 24	El Gouna	1–2	Al Ahly	El Gouna
16:00 CAT (UTC+2)	Gedo 53'	Report	Nedvěd 79'; Maher 87'	Stadium: El Gouna Stadium; Referee: Gehad Grisha

28 February 2019 25	El Gouna	2–1	Petrojet	El Gouna
16:00 CAT (UTC+2)	Wael 25'; Rayyan 70'	Report	Gadi 45'	Stadium: El Gouna Stadium; Referee: Tarek Magdy

12 March 2019 26	El Gouna	1–2	Al Ittihad	El Gouna
15:00 CAT (UTC+2)	Gedo 56'	Report	Kamar 35'; Tawfik 86'	Stadium: El Gouna Stadium; Referee: Mohamed El Sabahy

31 March 2019 27	Misr Lel Makkasa	0–0	El Gouna	Cairo (Note: Misr Lel Makkasa v El Gouna match was played at Osman Ahmed Osman Stadium in Cairo instead of Faiyum Stadium in Faiyum due to pitch status.)
19:30 CAT (UTC+2)		Report		Stadium: Osman Ahmed Osman Stadium; Referee: Walid Abdel Aziz

6 April 2019 28	El Gouna	1–1	Nogoom	El Gouna
17:30 CAT (UTC+2)	Rayyan 74'	Report	Amin 30'	Stadium: El Gouna Stadium; Referee: Mohamed El Hanafy

10 April 2019 (Note: Ismaily v El Gouna match, originally scheduled to be played on 13 December 2018, was postponed due to conflicting with Raja Casablanca v Ismaily match in the Arab Club Champions Cup, which was set to be played on 11 December 2018. The match was later rescheduled to be played on 10 April 2019.) 17	Ismaily	2–2	El Gouna	Suez (Note: Ismaily v El Gouna match was played at the Egyptian Army Stadium in Suez instead of Ismailia Stadium in Ismailia due to maintenance.)
17:30 CAT (UTC+2)	Shilongo 45'; Metwalli 58' (pen.)	Report	Mekky 15', 90+4'	Stadium: Egyptian Army Stadium; Referee: Ibrahim Nour El Din

15 April 2019 29	ENPPI	4–0	El Gouna	Cairo
20:00 CAT (UTC+2)	Kaoud 9'; Refaat 26' (pen.); Ghaly 64'; Lukombe 89'	Report		Stadium: Petro Sport Stadium; Referee: Mohamed Adel

19 April 2019 30	El Gouna	2–0	Tala'ea El Gaish	El Gouna
20:00 CAT (UTC+2)	Abdel Naim 81'; Nadi 90+5'	Report		Stadium: El Gouna Stadium; Referee: Mohamed Maarouf

30 April 2019 31	Smouha	0–0	El Gouna	Alexandria
17:30 CAT (UTC+2)		Report		Stadium: Haras El Hodoud Stadium (Note: Smouha v El Gouna match was played at Haras El Hodoud Stadium instead of Borg El Arab Stadium due to pitch status.); Referee: Mohamed El Sabahy

10 May 2019 32	El Gouna	1–4	Al Mokawloon Al Arab	El Gouna
22:00 CAT (UTC+2)	Rayyan 22'	Report	Jaziri 2', 53'; Panom 37' (o.g.); Ali 90+4' (pen.)	Stadium: El Gouna Stadium; Referee: Ibrahim Nour El Din

27 May 2019 34	El Gouna	0–0	Ismaily	El Gouna
22:00 CAT (UTC+2)		Report		Stadium: El Gouna Stadium; Referee: Marius Avram (Romania)

21 July 2019 (Note: El Gouna v Zamalek match, originally scheduled to be played on 20 May 2019, was postponed due to conflicting with RS Berkane v Zamalek match in the CAF Confederation Cup, which was set to be played on 19 May 2019. The match was later rescheduled to be played on 21 July 2019.) 33	El Gouna	2–2	Zamalek	El Gouna
20:00 CAT (UTC+2)	Rayyan 78'; Shabrawy 88'	Report	Hamed 64'; Abdel Aziz 90+7'	Stadium: El Gouna Stadium; Referee: Mahmoud Ashour

=== Egypt Cup ===
10 October 2018 Round of 32	Wadi Degla	4–1	El Gouna	Cairo
17:00 CAT (UTC+2)	Helal 8'; Gamal 19', 84'; Mamdouh 59'	Report	Magdy 38' (pen.)	Stadium: Petro Sport Stadium; Referee: Ibrahim Nour El Din

== Statistics ==
=== Appearances and goals ===
No.	Pos	Player	Egyptian Premier League		Egypt Cup		Total	
No.	Pos	Player	Apps	Goals	Apps	Goals	Apps	Goals
1	GK	(Egypt) Mahmoud El Gharabawy	12	0	0	0	12	0
2	DF	(Egypt) Islam Gaber	0+1	0	0	0	1	0
3	DF	(Egypt) Khaled Sobhy	16+1	0	0	0	17	0
4	DF	(Egypt) Ahmed Said	22+2	2	0	0	24	2
5	DF	(Egypt) Louay Wael	23+1	3	1	0	25	3
7	FW	(Egypt) Mahmoud Shabrawy	8+5	3	0	0	13	3
8	FW	(Senegal) Ousseynou Boye	0+7	0	0	0	7	0
9	FW	(Egypt) Ahmed Hassan Mekky	7	3	0	0	7	3
10	FW	(Egypt) Islam Roshdi	18+6	6	0	0	24	6
11	DF	(Egypt) Hossam Zein	2+2	0	1	0	5	0
12	DF	(Egypt) Ahmed Ali	28+2	1	0	0	30	1
13	DF	(Cameroon) Jonathan Ngwem	20+2	0	0	0	22	0
14	MF	(Egypt) Ahmed Eid	5+11	1	0	0	16	1
15	FW	(Egypt) Mohamed Nagy	20+8	3	0	0	28	3
16	MF	(Egypt) Sherif Dabo	3+1	0	0	0	4	0
17	FW	(Egypt) Mohamed Nadi	21+4	2	0+1	0	26	2
18	MF	(Egypt) Ahmed Magdy	11+3	1	1	1	15	2
19	FW	(Egypt) Mohamed Abdel Gawad	1+6	0	0+1	0	8	0
20	FW	(Egypt) Ahmed El Alfi	3+1	0	0	0	4	0
22	MF	(Egypt) Mohamed Mohsen Leila	3+3	0	1	0	7	0
23	GK	(Egypt) Haitham Mohamed	3	0	1	0	4	0
25	MF	(Ethiopia) Gatoch Panom	29+2	1	0	0	31	1
27	FW	(Egypt) Islam Abdel Naim	12+2	2	0	0	14	2
28	MF	(Ivory Coast) Serge Aka	12	0	0	0	12	0
29	FW	(Egypt) Salah Khattab	0+2	0	1	0	3	0
31	MF	(Egypt) Akram Tawfik	9+1	1	0	0	10	1
33	DF	(Egypt) Amr Saadawy	5+5	0	1	0	11	0
34	MF	(Egypt) Ahmed Abaza	0	0	0	0	0	0
39	FW	(Egypt) Ahmed Yasser Rayyan	11+2	7	0	0	13	7
42	DF	(Egypt) Mahmoud El Gazzer	11	0	0	0	11	0
70	MF	(Egypt) Ahmed Hamdy	11+3	1	0	0	14	1
99	GK	(Egypt) Omar Radwan	19	0	0	0	19	0
Players transferred out during the season
6	DF	(Egypt) Mohamed Abou Seria	1+1	0	1	0	3	0
8	MF	(Egypt) Mostafa Gaber	7+3	0	0	0	10	0
16	GK	(Palestine) Ramzi Saleh	0	0	0	0	0	0
20	FW	(Nigeria) Chisom Chikatara	7+4	1	1	0	12	1
21	MF	(Ivory Coast) Abdoulaye Coulibaly	2+3	0	1	0	6	0
24	MF	(Egypt) Ahmed El Shenawy	11+3	0	0	0	14	0
35	DF	(Egypt) Karim Salem	1	0	1	0	2	0
45	FW	(Egypt) Fady Farid	2+1	0	0	0	3	0

=== Goalscorers ===
Rank	Position	Name	Egyptian Premier League	Egypt Cup	Total
1	FW	(Egypt) Ahmed Yasser Rayyan	7	0	7
2	FW	(Egypt) Islam Roshdi	6	0	6
3	FW	(Egypt) Ahmed Hassan Mekky	3	0	3
3	FW	(Egypt) Mohamed Nagy	3	0	3
3	FW	(Egypt) Mahmoud Shabrawy	3	0	3
3	DF	(Egypt) Louay Wael	3	0	3
7	FW	(Egypt) Islam Abdel Naim	2	0	2
7	MF	(Egypt) Ahmed Magdy	1	1	2
7	FW	(Egypt) Mohamed Nadi	2	0	2
7	DF	(Egypt) Ahmed Said	2	0	2
11	DF	(Egypt) Ahmed Ali	1	0	1
11	FW	(Nigeria) Chisom Chikatara	1	0	1
11	MF	(Egypt) Ahmed Eid	1	0	1
11	MF	(Egypt) Ahmed Hamdy	1	0	1
11	MF	(Ethiopia) Gatoch Panom	1	0	1
11	MF	(Egypt) Akram Tawfik	1	0	1
Own goal			0	0	0
Total			38	1	39

=== Clean sheets ===
Rank	Name	Egyptian Premier League	Egypt Cup	Total
1	(Egypt) Mahmoud El Gharabawy	4	0	4
1	(Egypt) Omar Radwan	4	0	4
Total		8	0	8
