= Sawiris family =

Egyptian business family

- Country: Egypt
- Origin: Coptic Christian, Egypt
- Founded: 1950

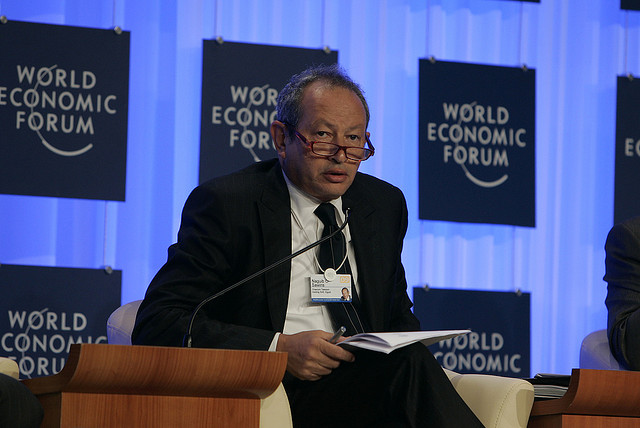
Naguib Sawiris, World Economic Forum on the Middle East

The Sawiris family (Coptic: ⲥⲉⲩⲏⲣⲟⲥ) is an Egyptian Coptic Christian family that owns the Orascom conglomerate, spanning telecommunications, construction, tourism, industries and technology. In 2008, Forbes estimated the family's net worth at US$36 billion.

== Notable members ==
Onsi Sawiris (1930–2021) was the patriarch of the family. Various companies in the group are run by Onsi Sawiris' three sons and other family members:

- Naguib Sawiris (born in 1954)
- Samih Sawiris (born in 1957)
- Nassef Sawiris (born in 1961)

== Business career ==
Onsi Sawiris founded Orascom in 1950 that has grown into a conglomerate of companies including Orascom Telecom Holding (أوراسكوم للإتصالات), and Orascom Technology Solutions (OTS) (أوراسكوم للتكنولوجيا), both run by Naguib Sawiris, Orascom Construction Industries (OCI) (أوراسكوم للإنشاء والصناعة) run by Nassef Sawiris, Orascom Hotels and Development (OHD) (أوراسكوم للفنادق والتنمية) run by Samih Sawiris.

Naguib Sawiris is an investor in Mobinil, Egypt's main mobile phone company, and has expanded into Algeria, Tunisia, Pakistan, Bangladesh and even North Korea. He has also invested through affiliates in Italy (through Wind Telecomunicazioni and Canada (through Globalive Wireless and its Wind Mobile). Naguib Sawiris is also investor in a highly influential Egyptian independent newspaper Almasry Alyoum and the owner of TV interests, most notably in OTV (Orascom Television).

On 20 July 2018, it was announced that Nassef Sawiris was to become a major shareholder of historic English football club Aston Villa F.C., through the investment group, NSWE, formed with U.S. billionaire Wes Edens.

The Sawiris family also actively engages in charity and economic and social development through Sawiris Foundation for Social Development (مؤسسة ساويرس للتنمية الإجتماعية) that includes Sawiris Foundation Awards for Egyptian Literature (جائزة مؤسسة ساويرس للأدب المصري).

== See also ==
- Construction industry in Egypt
