= Nassef Sawiris =

Egyptian businessman (born 1961)

- ناصف ساويرس
- Born: 19 January 1961 (age 65); Aswan, Egypt
- Education: Deutsche Evangelische Oberschule
- Alma mater: University of Chicago
- Occupation: Businessman
- Title: Executive Chairman of OCI Global; Co-owner and Chairman of Aston Villa; Chairman of Adidas AG
- Spouse: Sherine Sawiris
- Children: 4
- Parent: Onsi Sawiris
- Relatives: Naguib Sawiris and Samih Sawiris (brothers)

Nassef Onsi Sawiris (Arabic: ناصف أنسي ساويرس; born 19 January 1961) is an Egyptian businessman, and the youngest of Onsi Sawiris' three sons (his brothers are Naguib and Samih). As of January 2026, his net worth was estimated at US$8.5 billion, making him the richest Egyptian.

== Early life ==
Sawiris was born on 19 January 1961, in Aswan, Egypt, into a Coptic Christian family. He received his secondary education from the Deutsche Evangelische Oberschule Kairo. He then continued at University of Chicago where he received a bachelor's degree in economics in 1982.

== Career ==
Sawiris joined the Orascom group in 1982 and oversaw the construction activities of Orascom Construction following the transfer of management control from his father Onsi Sawiris in 1995. He became CEO of Orascom Construction Industries following the company's incorporation in 1998. He served on the board of Besix, following OCI SAE acquiring a 50% stake in the company in 2004, and a member of the remuneration and nominations committee until 2017.

He was on the board of directors of the Cairo and Alexandria Stock Exchanges from 2004 to 2007, and was also a board director at the Dubai International Financial Exchange DIFX from July 2008 to June 2010.

In January 2013, he became CEO of OCI NV when they acquired the former parent company OCI SAE. In 2015, he was elected a board member of LafargeHolcim, having served on Lafarge SA's board since 2008.

In October 2015, it was reported that Sawiris had acquired a stake in Adidas AG via his investment company NNS Holding Sàrl Luxembourg. In 2016 he was appointed supervisory director of Adidas AG, Herzogenaurach, Germany.

In October 2020, Sawiris founded Avanti Acquisition Corp, a special-purpose acquisition company. However, after failing to acquire another company, Avanti Acquisition was wound up in October 2022.

== Sports ownership ==
Sawiris has invested heavily in the ownership of sports teams, particularly within association football. Alongside billionaire Wes Edens, Sawiris owns the football club holding company V Sports: who own Premier League team Aston Villa and a 29% stake in Primeira Liga team Vitória S.C.

As of March 2021, Sawiris also owns a 6.3% stake in American company MSG Sports: whose assets include the NBA team New York Knicks and NHL team New York Rangers.

=== Aston Villa ===
In July 2018, a consortium consisting of Sawiris and fellow billionaire Wes Edens, referring to themselves as NSWE, purchased a 55% controlling stake worth £30m in English Championship club Aston Villa. The club had faced significant cash flow issues under previous owner Tony Xia, and faced a potential winding-up order by HMRC, following an unpaid £4m tax bill. Following the takeover, NSWE invested significant funds into addressing said issues.

Following a significant turnover of management and playing staff: including the appointment of former Liverpool executive Christian Purslow as CEO and the appointment of Dean Smith as manager, the club would be subsequently be promoted back to the Premier League. This included a period of Villa's second longest winning streak of 10 games. Following promotion, NSWE bought out the remainder of Xia's shares to become sole owners in August 2019. This was done by taking on an unpaid £30m debt owed by Xia to former owner Randy Lerner.

Sawiris and Eden's ownership of Aston Villa has marked a period of heavy investment, with approximately £360m of debt-free share capital injected into the as of August 2022. Plans to expand Villa Park from 42,682 seats to over 50,000, including the demolition of the North Stand and the creation of a major retail venue, are at an advanced stage. The project is set to cost over £100m, and will be entirely funded by V Sports.

In 2021, the NSWE holding company rebranded to V Sports, with a view of investing into other clubs around the world via a multi-club model.

=== Vitória de Guimarães ===
In February 2023, V Sports entered into an agreement to purchase a 46% stake worth €5m in Portuguese Primeira Liga team Vitória S.C. As part of the agreement, V Sports would invest an additional €2m into sporting infrastructure within the next 2 years, and provide a credit line of up to €20m. The agreement was ratified by Vitória's members on 4 March 2023.

== Other activities ==
- University of Chicago, Member of the Board of Trustees (since 2013)
- Council on Foreign Relations (CFR), Member of the Global Board of Advisors
- Cleveland Clinic, Member of the International Leadership Board

== Personal life ==
Sawiris is married to Sherine, has four children, lives in Cairo, and maintains a residence in New York City. He is a Coptic Christian.

== See also ==
- Construction industry in Egypt
