= Black Theama =

Egyptian hip hop band

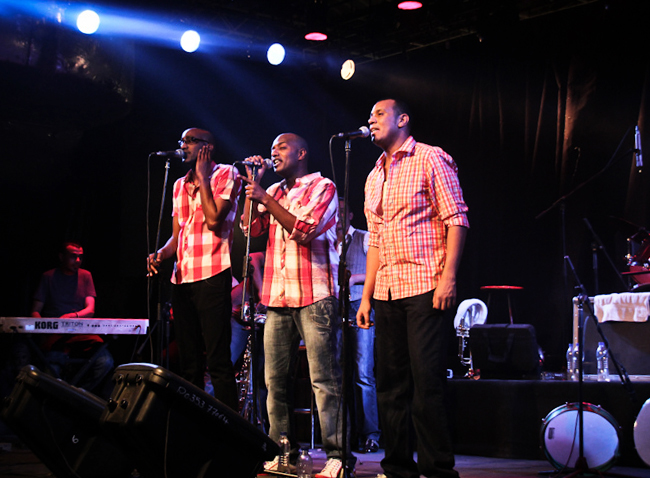
- Black Theama in 2011

Background information
- Genres: Reggae, hip-hop, R&B
- Years active: 2004
- Members: 3

Black Theama (بلاك تيما) is an Egyptian band that was founded in 2004. The band's musical genre covers a wide range of styles from Nubian rhythms, reggae, hip-hop and R&B, to music with other African influences. Through their music, they sing to "celebrate the black experience in Egypt." According to Amir Salah, the band strives to maintain a sound true to the name they carry, which is unique, natural, and independent. Black Theama tries to create music that does not fall in line with the "standard pop-music cliches."

"Our project is not to croon about starry-eyed love and teenage heartbreak. We assumed that there was a wide array of emotions and issues not yet tackled in contemporary singing, and we think that there is an insistent demand for that genre" - Ahmed Bahr, singer and co-founder of Black Theama.

== Background ==
The group was founded by Amir Salah El Deen, who was originally in a theater group called Karisma. Together with his friend Mohamed Abdo, they met the third member of their future group, Ahmed Bahr, at one of their early shows. They worked well together and decided to form a new group which became Black Theama.

Black Theama has collaborated with many other musicians over the years. Massar Egbari and Cairokee are just two of the Egyptian bands that Black Theama has performed with. Aside from the three core singers of Black Theama, many other musicians are also part of the collaboration. Among them was Weka Soliman current guitarist of Canadian rock band Special Ops.

=== Underground following ===
The musical group is unique for its decision to remain an independent band. Black Theama is not affiliated with any large commercial company within the music industry. The group prefers to utilize their own resources to produce their music, recordings, and promotions. Black Theama's fan base and underground following fund the band. Their fan base is totally responsible for the band's success and ability to finance further music production. The cost of music production as an independent group can be expensive; the average cost of producing a record is between LE 100,000 and LE 600,000 Egyptian pounds. Black Theama has produced over 50 songs and a collection of music videos since its beginning.

The band strives to create music that reflects and captures the feel of daily life in Egypt, as well as their experiences as Egyptians from the South.

"It means being special, and being dark-skinned in Egypt... And people from the South have their own character, their own culture - even their tone of voice is different" — singer Mohammed Abdo.

Poets Ramy Yehia, Mido Zoheir, and Diaa el-Rahman have worked with Black Theama to create its unique sound and voice. The band's lyrics reflect the life, issues, and politics of Egyptian society, including lyrics that the "marginalized and underrepresented youth" can relate to.

Black Theama often performs at the Bibliotheca Alexandrina (Library of Alexandria) and at the El Sawy Culture wheel.

=== Nubian influence ===
The Nubian region of Egypt is located in the south of Upper Egypt. Black Theama infuses traditional Nubian folksongs into an alternative modern musical style that is growing in popularity. The musical group has an authentic feel while presenting new sounds and lyrics.

According to co-founder and singer Mohammad Abdo, "Southern music is one of the main tributaries of Egyptian music, and is a real part of our identity, not only because we originate from Nubia and are dark-skinned. We subconsciously came to recognize how much we’re affected by this unique character and culture, and moved by the music. We are always trying to work with the density of black music, including Nubian, and this provides our music with a distinct flavor."

== Performances ==
Black Theama has performed throughout Egypt, as well as in TV commercials and film soundtracks. During the 2013 Ramadan holiday season, Black Theama appeared in a Vodafone commercial. The band also sang the song used for the opening credits of the film 1000 Mabrouk.

== Awards ==
Black Theama was nominated at the 2013 World Music Awards for Best Group, Best Live Act, Best Song, and Best Video Clip for the song Fi Belad Al-ayy Haga (released June 2013). Black Theama was the first musical group to represent Egypt, as well as the region, at the international competition.

== Discography ==
Ghawy Bany Adameen, غاوي بني آدمين, released in April 2015, produced by Black Theama Productions, contains 14 songs : Enta Fakerny Hendy إنت فاكرني هندي Kebert كبرت Weenik وينك Kol Mara كل مرة Ousso Ousso أوسو أوسو Set El Hosn ست الحسن Lays Laha Mady ليس لها ماضي Akhbar Ahram Gomhoreya أخبار أهرام جمهورية Omaret El Nas عمارة الناس Ya Beban Ya Aliah يا بيبان يا عالية Ala Shut El Neel علي شط النيل Ya Prince El Layaly يا برنس الليالي Koun Saied كن سعيد Ghawy Bany Adameen غاوي بني آدمين

- Bahar بحار, released in 2010
  Kona Soghar كنا صغار
  Ouh Ah قرل اه
  Bahar بحار
  Ensan إنسان
  Eh Yaani ايه يعني (This song, which means "What If," received wide popularity breaking into the mainstream. The song describes a man who pokes fun at a girl who abandoned him, sung to a catchy melody.)
  ٌYa Sadek يا صديق
  Andy Ser عندي سر
  Zahmet El Metro زحمة المترو
  Alo Al Hob قالوا ع الحب
  Maghoun مجنون
  Eflet Zemam فلت زمام
  Zahma زحمة
- Black Theama, released Oct 8, 2013 under the label Arabian Collection.

=== Songs ===
- Hor حر
- Ahla Ayam أحلى أيام
- Eflet Zeman إفلت زمام
- Moka3ab Sokar مكعب سكر
- Kharasan خرسان
- Sa3at ساعات
- Gowaya (1000 Mabrok) جوايا -من فيلم ١٠٠٠ مبروك
- Bab El Donia (1000 Mabrouk) باب الدنيا من فيلم ١٠٠٠ مبروك
- Fe Belad El Ay Haga في بلاد الاي حاجة
