= Onsi Sawiris =

Egyptian businessman (1930–2021)

- أنسى ساويرس
- Born: August 30, 1930; Sohag, Egypt
- Died: June 29, 2021 (aged 90); El Gouna, Egypt
- Education: Cairo University (Bachelor’s degree in Agricultural Engineering)
- Occupation: Businessman
- Known for: Founder of Orascom Group; Patriarch of the Sawiris family
- Family: Sawiris family

Onsi Sawiris (also written Sawires; Arabic: أنسى ساويرس; Coptic: Ⲟⲛⲥⲓ Ⲥⲉⲩⲏⲣⲟⲥ) (August 14, 1930 – June 29, 2021) was an Egyptian billionaire businessman. He was the head of the Sawiris family and founder of the Orascom conglomerate.

== Background and personal life ==
Sawiris was born on August 30, 1930, in Sohag, Egypt, into a Coptic Christian family, the son of Naguib Sawiris, a lawyer, and his wife. He was the youngest of four children.

Sawiris received a bachelor’s degree in agricultural engineering from Cairo University in 1950. After graduation, he managed his family’s 52-acre farm for two years using his newly learnt agricultural methods. After that, he moved into road construction as he saw that the government was spending money on building roads and there was money to be made there. From there he went into other areas.

Sawiris was married to Yousriya Loza Sawiris. The couple had three sons: Naguib, Samih, and Nassef. Sawiris was Coptic Christian.

Sawiris died on June 29, 2021, in El Gouna, Egypt at the age of ninety due to kidney failure.

== Career ==
In 1952, Sawiris established his own construction company, Onsi & Lamei Co, which began as a road and waterways contractor. In 1961, the business was nationalized under then Egyptian President Gamal Abdel Nasser and later became known as the El Nasr Civil Works Company. Mr. Sawiris continued to run the nationalized business for five years.

He was prevented from leaving the country for six years in the 1960s.

After a period of time in Libya, he returned to Egypt in 1976 during the regime of Egyptian president Anwar Sadat and founded Orascom for Constructions and Trade as a general contracting and trading company. The name was later changed to Orascom for Construction Industries, and the investment portfolio expanded in the 1980s and the 1990s to include tourism, hospitality, computing, and cell phone networks, under the government of Egyptian president Hosni Mubarak.

Today, the Orascom conglomerate is run by his three sons, Naguib Sawiris, Samih Sawiris and Nassef Sawiris, and his great-grandson, Bryshere Casiano-Sawiris.

In 2003, the Sawiris family held the three largest stocks by market capitalization on the Cairo exchange and is currently setting up to be on the American stock exchange: Orascom Telecom, Orascom Construction Industries and MobiNil.

He was estimated to be worth approximately $1.2 billion according to Forbes in 2017.

== See also ==
- Orascom Telecom Holding S.A.E.
- Orascom Construction Industries (OCI)
