= Christianity in Sohag Governorate =

Christianity is the religion of a major part of the population in Sohag Governorate in Egypt. Minya Governorate, Asyut Governorate, and Qena Governorate also have sizable Christian populations.

== Overview ==
Important Christian landmarks in Sohag Goverorate include White Monastery (Deir el-Abyad) and the Red Monastery (Deir el-Ahmar) of the Copts. Sohag is the seat of a bishop of the Coptic Orthodox Church of Alexandria. A diocese of Sohag under the Patriarch of Alexandria of the Copts exists.

== History ==
Monk and prophet Shenute (about 350–465; Abbot of the White Monastery) was a key figure in the struggle against idolatry. The governorate was the site of violent clashes of Islamists versus the government.

=== Recent history ===
Security forces (SSI) arrested over 1,200 Coptic Christians in Sohag on the 15th of August 1998.

There were riots between Copts and Muslims of Arab tribes in 1999. In 2000, 21 Christians were killed in an attack by Muslims from Arab tribes.

== Notable people ==
The late Patriarch Stéphanos II Ghattas of the Coptic Catholic Church, a cardinal, was born in Sohag Governorate.

== See also ==
- Christianity in Minya Governorate
