= El Gouna =

Egyptian Red Sea resort city

Coordinates: 27°23′06″N 33°40′45″E

- city
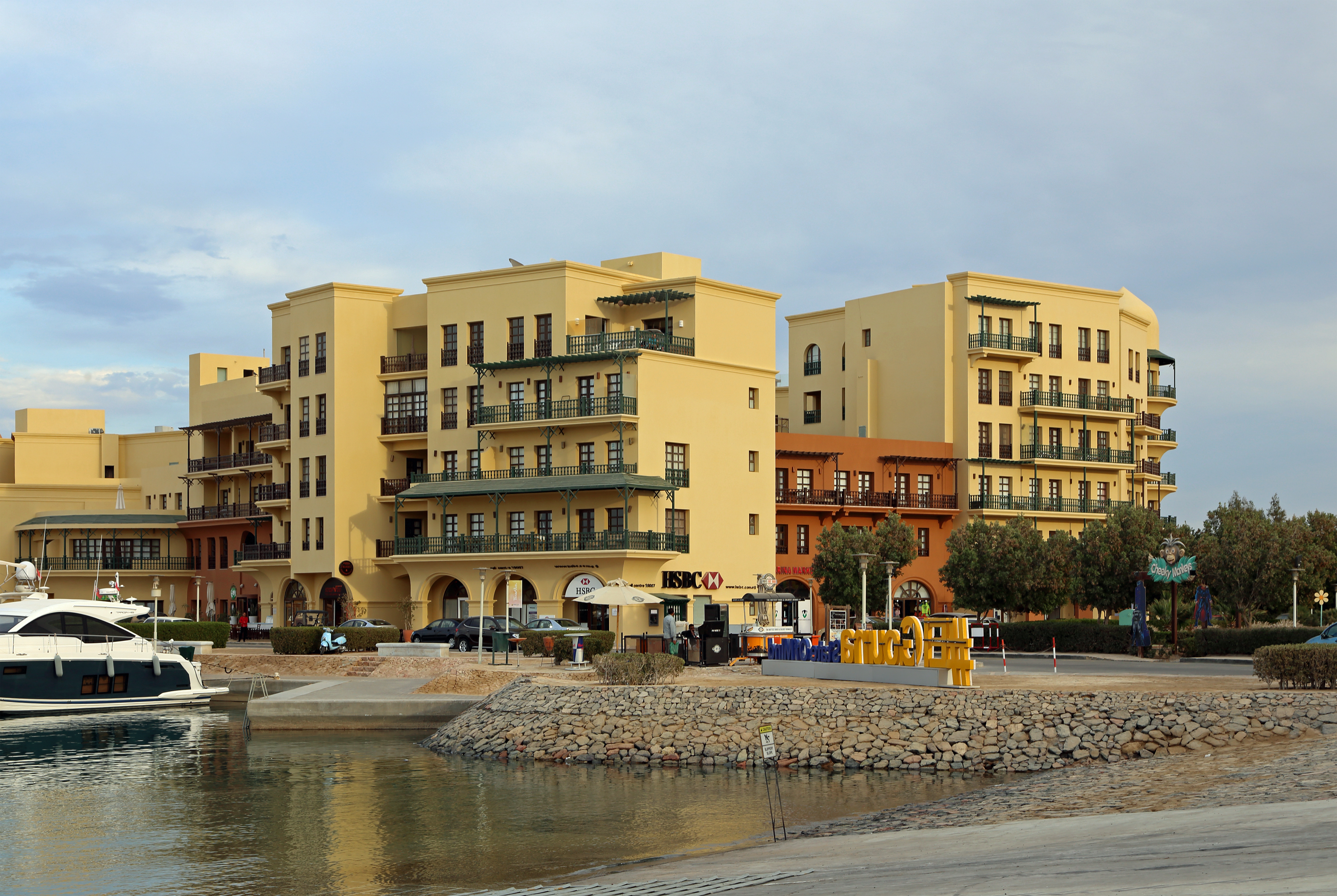
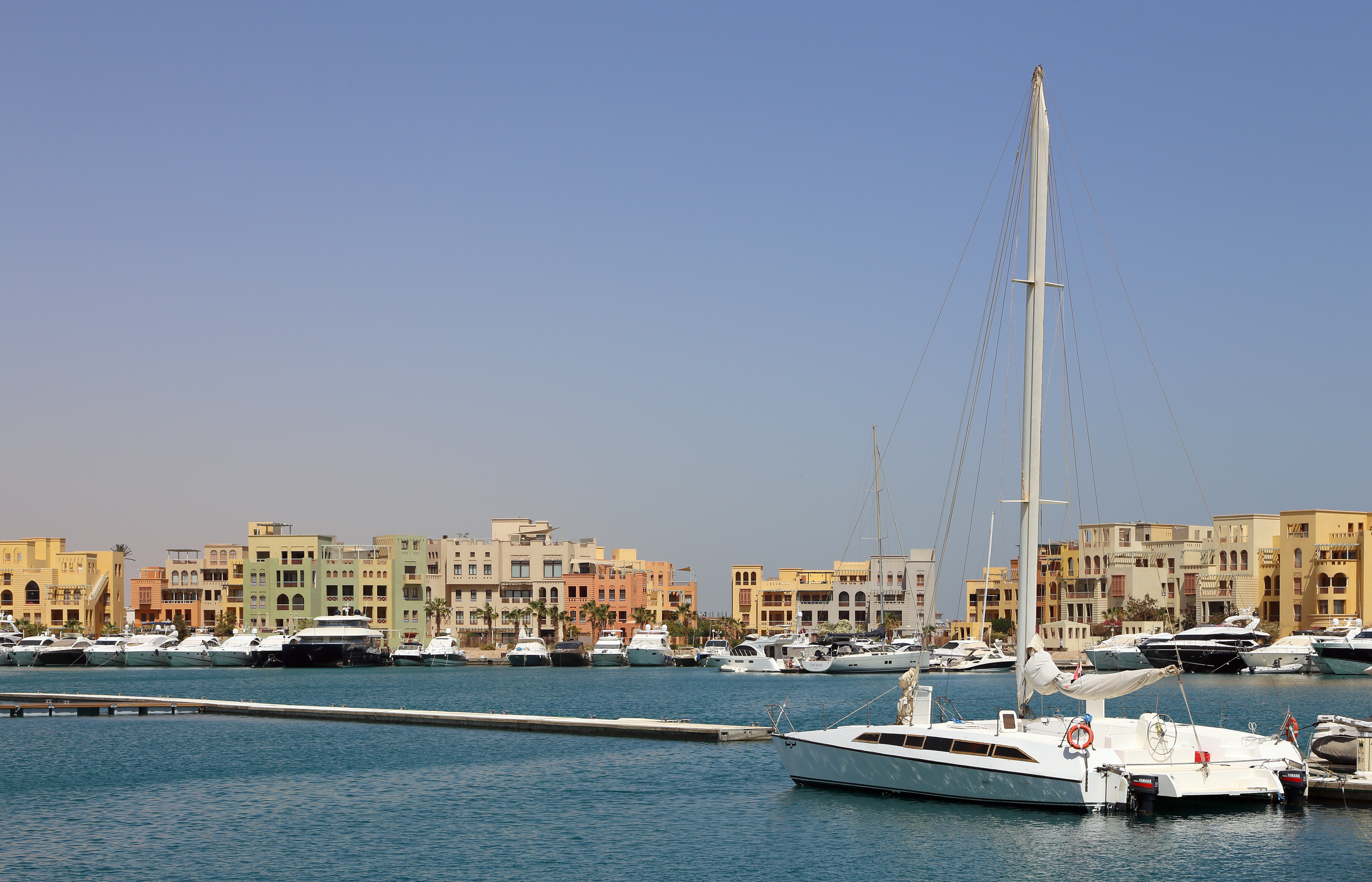
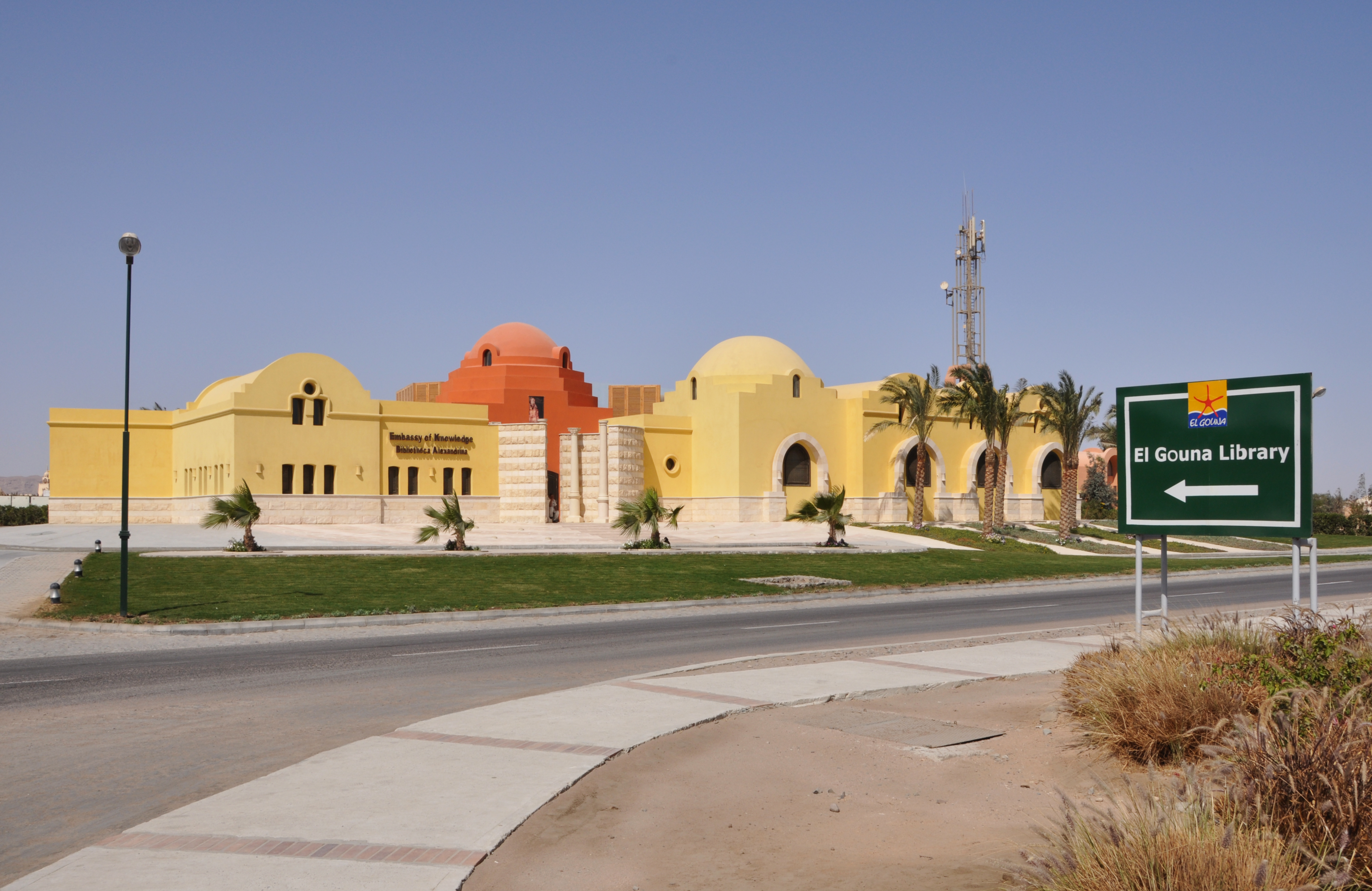
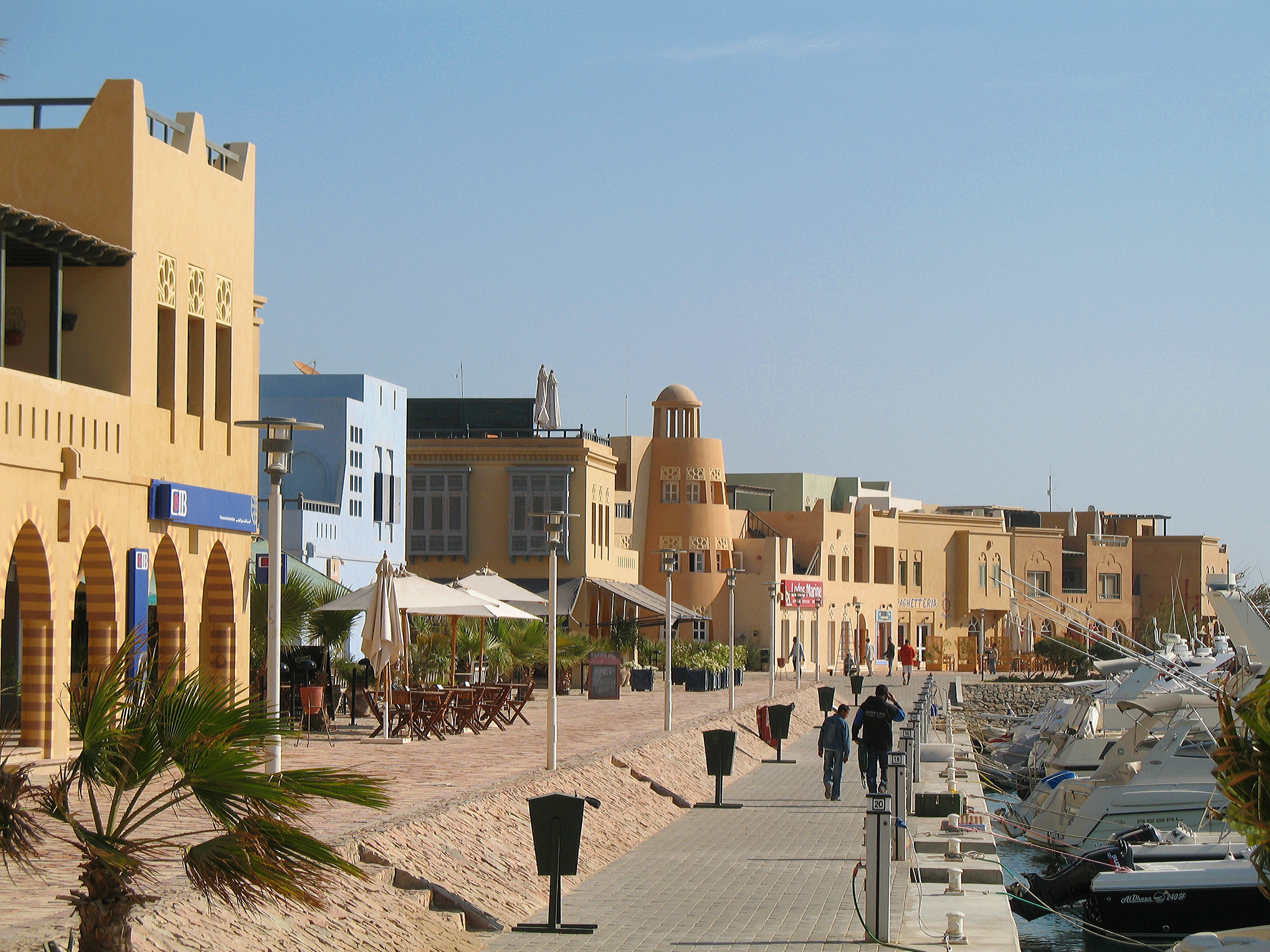
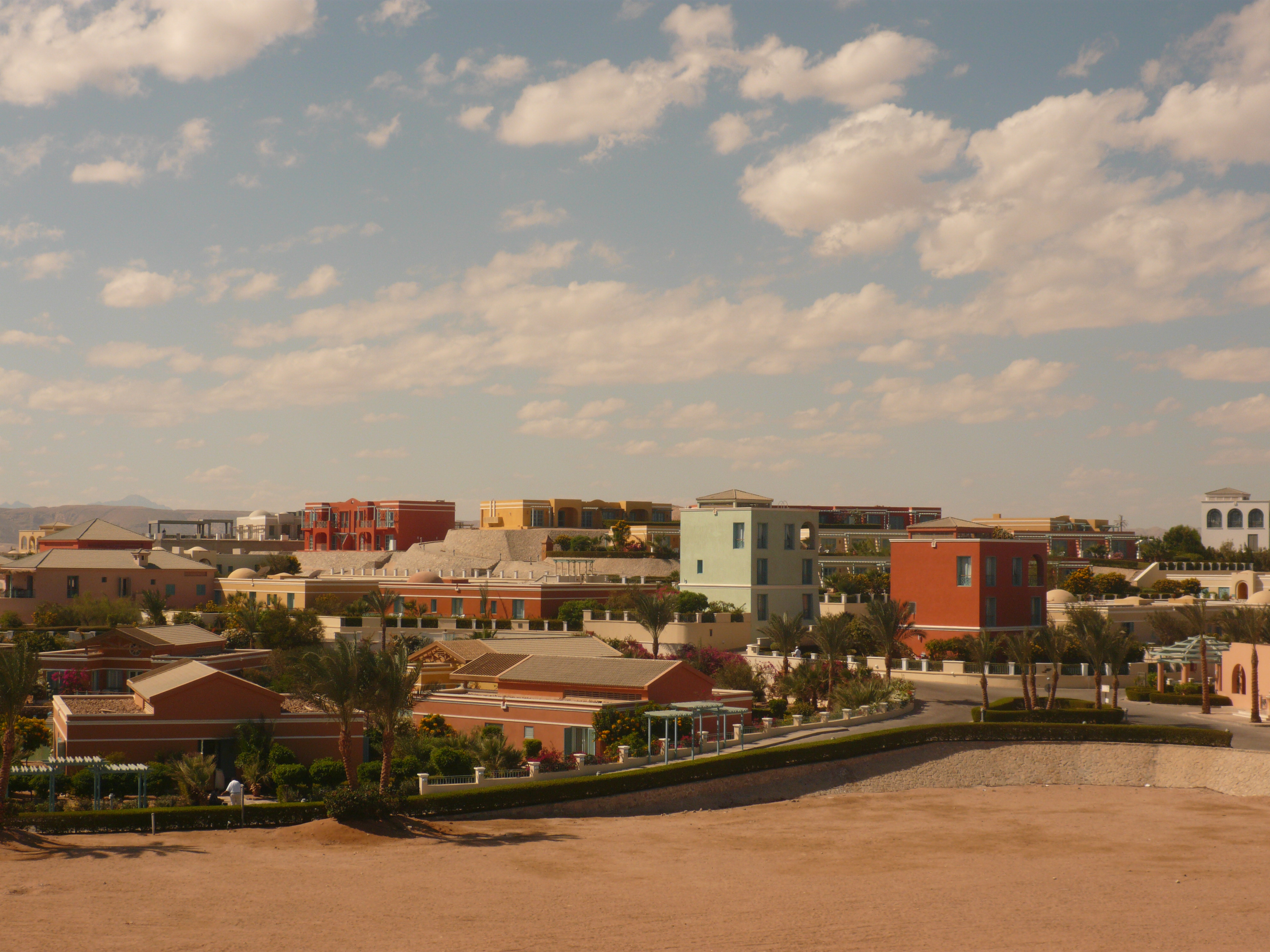
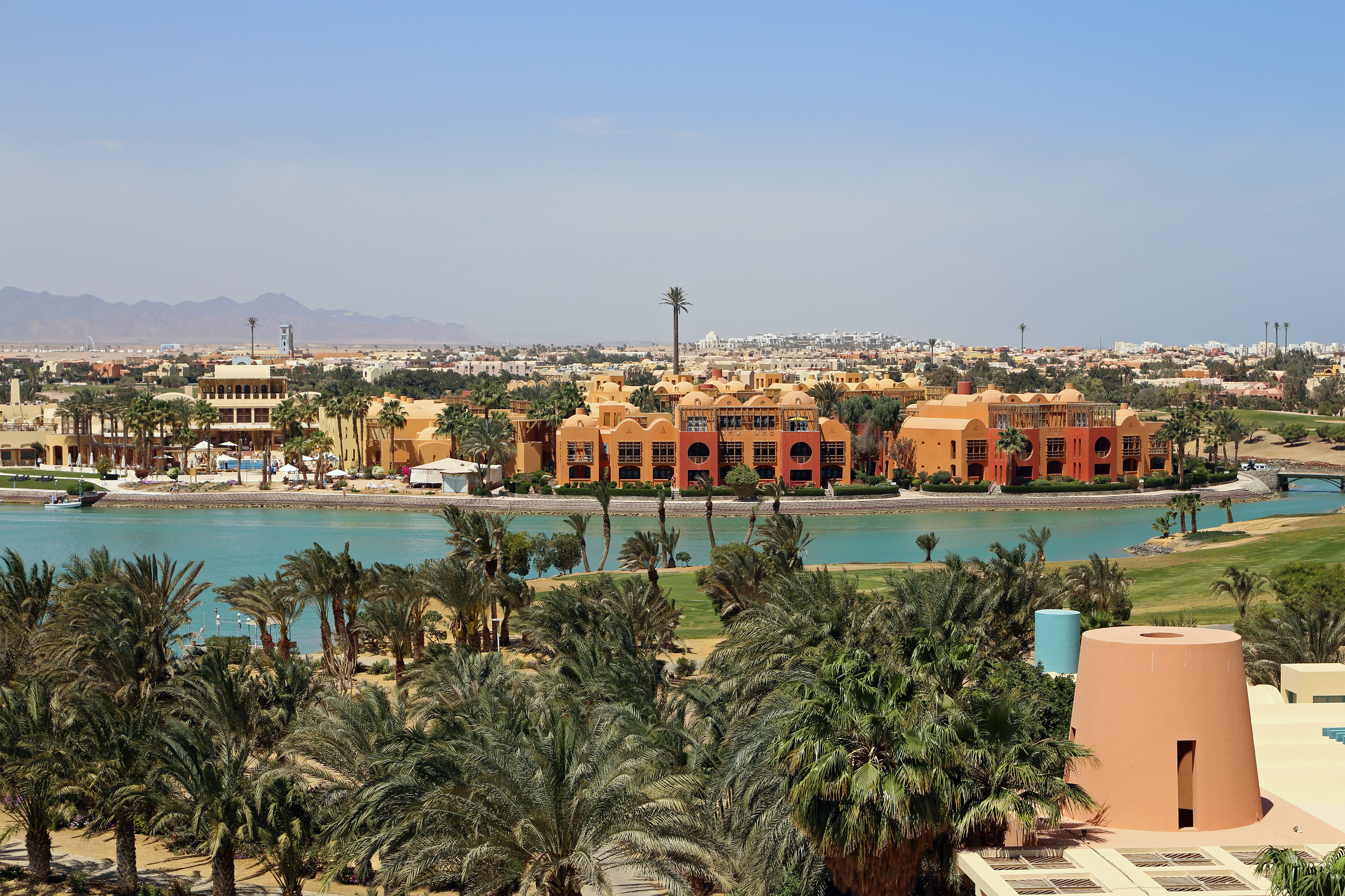
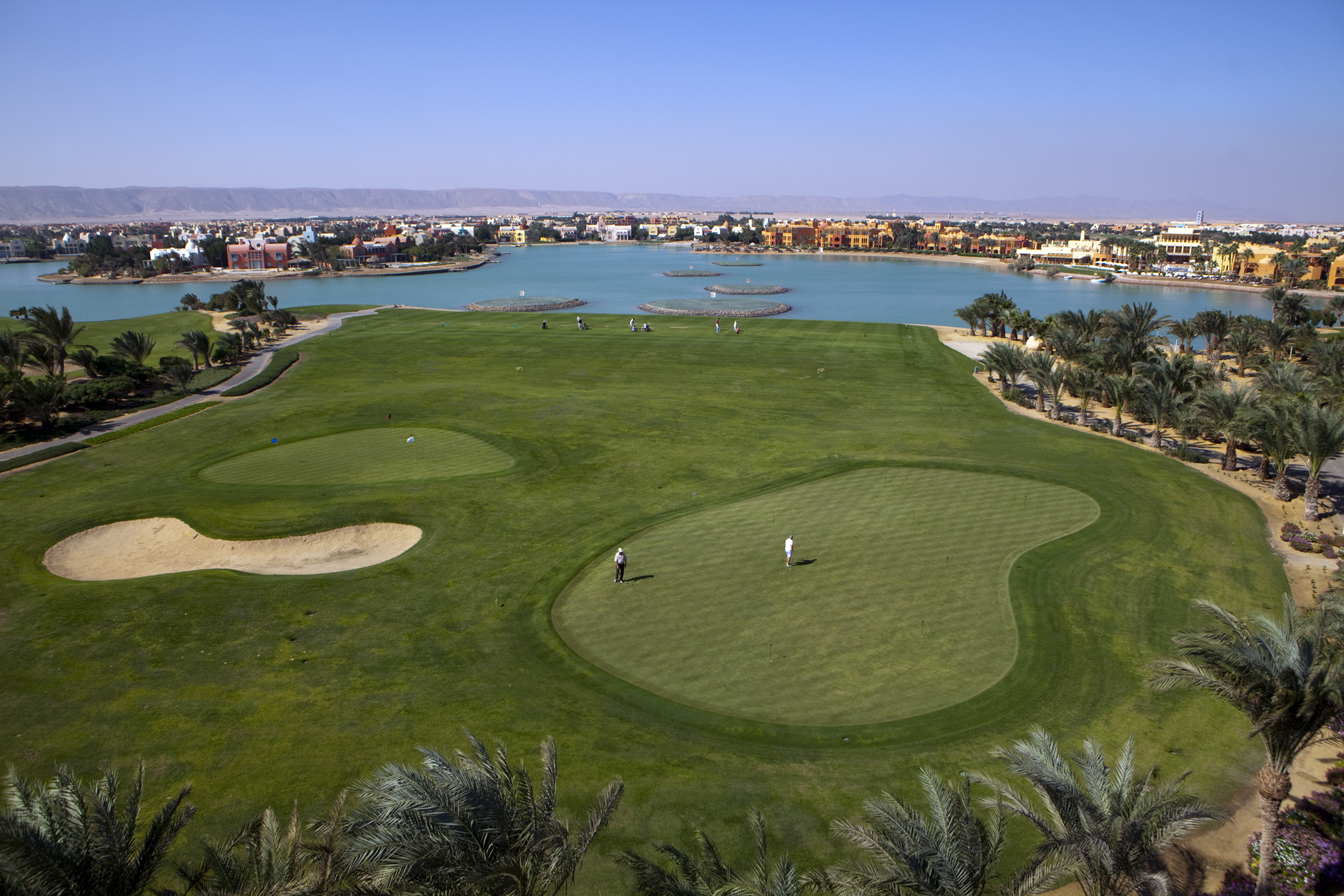
- Overview of El Gouna
- Interactive map of El Gouna
- Country: Egypt
- Governorate: Red Sea
- Founded: 1990
- Founder: Samih Sawiris
- Architects: Alfredo Freda; Michael Graves
- Time zone: UTC+2 (EET)
- Area code: (+20) 65

El Gouna (Egyptian Arabic: الجونة [elˈɡuːnæ], "the Lagoon") is an Egyptian city located on the Red Sea in the Red Sea Governorate, Egypt. It is located 20 kilometres (12 miles) north of Hurghada. It is part of the Red Sea Riviera, and a host city of the El Gouna Film Festival. It was created in 1990, and is owned and developed by Samih Sawiris' Orascom Development.

El Gouna is originally known as a tourist city, it has 10 kilometers of coastline and consists of 20 islands surrounded by lagoons. The city is 25 kilometers away from the Hurghada International Airport.

== Overview ==
El Gouna's buildings were designed by European and American architects to resemble traditional rural Egyptian architecture such as that found in the Egyptian countryside and in Nubian villages. El Gouna specializes in watersports. There are several beaches including Zeytuna Beach (Egyptian Arabic: شاطئ زيتونة) located on its own island, Mangroovy Beach, Moods Beach and other hotel beaches.

There are three main areas in El Gouna, Downtown, Tamr Henna Square (Egyptian Arabic: ميدان تمر حنة) and the Abu Tig Marina (Egyptian Arabic: مارينا أبو تيج). It also has El Gouna Mosque and a Coptic Orthodox church, the Church of St. Mary and the Archangels.

In 2017 an annual film festival was established, the El Gouna Film Festival. Founded by telecom billionaire Naguib Sawiris, El Gouna Film Festival was previously attended by globally prominent celebrities including Patrick Dempsey, Sylvester Stallone and Owen Wilson.

== Climate ==
The weather in El Gouna is sunny all year long. Temperatures range between 17 °C (63 °F) and 33 °C (91 °F). Humidity is 22% on average. Köppen-Geiger climate classification system classifies its climate as hot desert (BWh).

Climate data for El Gouna
Month	Jan	Feb	Mar	Apr	May	Jun	Jul	Aug	Sep	Oct	Nov	Dec	Year
Mean daily maximum °C (°F)	21.3 (70.3)	22.6 (72.7)	24.9 (76.8)	28.5 (83.3)	31.8 (89.2)	34.1 (93.4)	34.8 (94.6)	34.8 (94.6)	32.6 (90.7)	30.2 (86.4)	26.6 (79.9)	22.7 (72.9)	28.7 (83.7)
Daily mean °C (°F)	15.3 (59.5)	16.3 (61.3)	18.8 (65.8)	22.4 (72.3)	25.8 (78.4)	28.6 (83.5)	29.6 (85.3)	29.6 (85.3)	27.7 (81.9)	24.9 (76.8)	20.8 (69.4)	16.8 (62.2)	23.1 (73.5)
Mean daily minimum °C (°F)	9.4 (48.9)	10.1 (50.2)	12.8 (55.0)	16.3 (61.3)	19.9 (67.8)	23.1 (73.6)	24.4 (75.9)	24.5 (76.1)	22.9 (73.2)	19.6 (67.3)	15 (59)	11 (52)	17.4 (63.4)
Average precipitation mm (inches)	0 (0)	0 (0)	0 (0)	0 (0)	0 (0)	0 (0)	0 (0)	0 (0)	0 (0)	0 (0)	0 (0)	1 (0.0)	1 (0)
Source: Climate-Data.org

== See also ==
- Hurghada
- Red Sea Riviera
- Marsa Alam
- Sahl Hasheesh
- List of cities and towns in Egypt
