= Amir Eid =

Egyptian musician & actor

Amir Eid أمير عيد
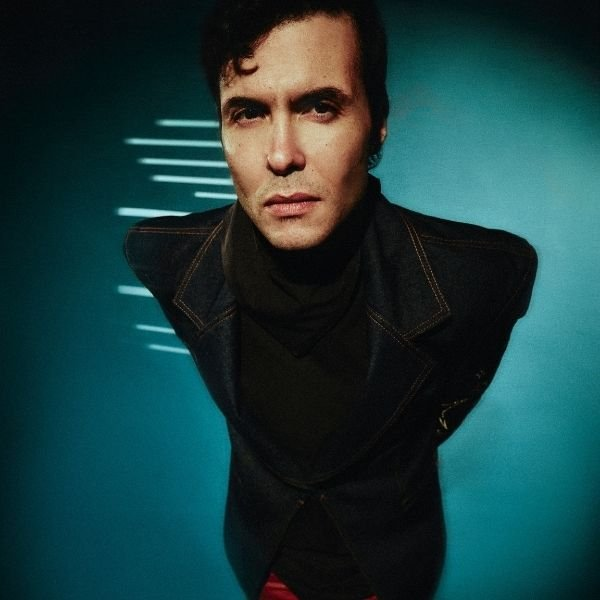
- Eid in 2021

Background information
- Born: November 26, 1983 (age 42); Cairo, Egypt
- Origin: Cairo, Egypt
- Genres: Arabic pop; Egyptian music
- Occupations: Actor; musician; singer
- Years active: 2003–present

Amir Eid (Arabic: أمیر عید; born November 26, 1983) is an Egyptian singer, songwriter, and actor, the founder and lead vocalist of the rock band Cairokee. The band, established in 2003, recorded in the political songs during the Egyptian revolution, including "Sout el Horeya" and "Ya el Midan". He is a supporter of the Palestinian cause, which featured in his song "Telk Qadeya".

== Early life ==
Amir Eid was born in Cairo, Egypt.

== Music career ==
Eid founded the Egyptian rock band Cairokee in 2003.

In October 2023, Eid was among the 25 Middle Eastern and North African artists who collaborated on the single "Rajieen", released to raise funds in response to the Gaza genocide amid the Gaza war. On 30 November 2023, Eid released "Telk Qadeya" ("This Cause"), also in solidarity with Palestine. The song, criticizing the United States for not doing enough to stop Israel, has had over 10 million views on YouTube.

=== Albums ===
- 2024: Roxi

== Filmography ==
- 2019: When We're Born
- 2022: Rivo
- 2024: Reasons for Travel
