= Copts in Egypt =

Coptic people born in or residing in Egypt

- (Egypt)

Total population
- 10 million (estimate) (Note: In 2017, the Wall Street Journal reported that "the vast majority of Egypt's estimated 9.5 million Christians, approximately 10% of the country's population, are Orthodox Copts." In 2019, the Associated Press cited an estimate of 10 million Copts in Egypt. In 2015, the Wall Street Journal reported: "The Egyptian government estimates about 5 million Copts, but the Coptic Orthodox Church says 15-18 million. Reliable numbers are hard to find but estimates suggest they make up somewhere between 6% and 18% of the population." In 2004, BBC News reported that Copts were 5–10% of the Egyptian population. The CIA World Factbook reported a 2015 estimate that 10% of the Egyptian population is Christian (including both Copts and non-Copts).)

Languages
- Egyptian Arabic; Coptic; (Liturgical only; nearly extinct but it is in a process of revival among Copts)

Religion
- Coptic Orthodox Church; Coptic Catholic Church

Copts in Egypt refers to Coptic people born in or residing in Egypt. The word Copt is derived from "qibt" in the Arabic language meaning Egyptian, which evolved from the ancient Greek term "Aigyptos" for Egypt.

== Demographics ==
As of 2019, "Copts are generally understood to make up approximately 10 percent of Egypt's population," with an estimated population of 9.5 million (figure cited in the Wall Street Journal, 2017) or 10 million (figure cited in the Associated Press, 2019). Smaller or larger figures have also been cited, in the range of "somewhere between 6% and 18% of the population," with the Egyptian government estimating lower numbers and the Coptic Orthodox Church estimating much higher numbers. A lack of definite, reliable demographic data renders all estimates uncertain.

=== Socio-economic ===
In Egypt, Copts have relatively higher educational attainment, relatively higher wealth index, and a stronger representation in white collar job types, but limited representation in security agencies. The majority of demographic, socioeconomic and health indicators are similar among Copts and Muslims. Historically; many Copts were accountants, and in 1961 Coptic Christians owned 51% of the Egyptian banks. A Pew Center study about religion and education around the world in 2016, found that around 26% of Egyptian Christians obtain a university degree in institutions of higher education.

Palm Sunday prayers at the Monastery of Saint Simon the Tanner in Cairo

According to the scholar Andrea Rugh Copts tend to belong to the educated middle and upper-middle class, and according to scholar Lois Farag "The Copts still played the major role in managing Egypt's state finances. They held 20% of total state capital, 45% of government employment, and 45% of government salarie". According to scholar J. D. Pennington 45% of the medical doctors, 60% of the pharmacists of Egypt were Christians.

A number of Coptic business and land-owning families became very wealthy and influential such as the Egyptian Coptic Christian Sawiris family that owns the Orascom conglomerate, spanning telecommunications, construction, tourism, industries and technology. In 2008, Forbes estimated the family's net worth at $36 billion. According to scholars Maristella Botticini and Zvi Eckstein argue that Copts have relatively higher educational attainment and relatively higher wealth index, due to Coptic Christianity emphasis on literacy and that Coptic Christianity encouraged the accumulation of human capital.

== History ==
The early church historian Eusebius states in his Chronicle that Mark arrived in Egypt in the third year of Emperor Claudius (43 A.D.), marking the beginning of Christianity in Egypt. By 641 AD, the Arab forces take over Egypt, marking the beginning of the Arab-Muslim period in Egypt.

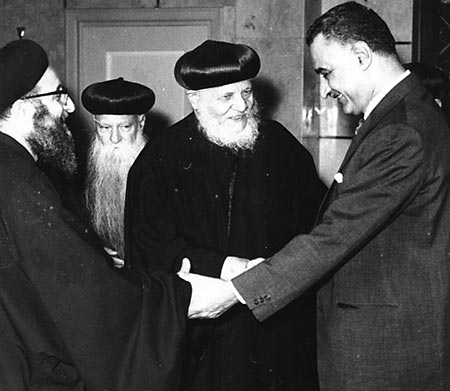
President Nasser welcomes a delegation of Coptic bishops (1965)

Under Muslim rule, the Copts were cut off from the mainstream of Christianity, and were compelled to adhere to the Pact of Umar covenant, thus assigned to Dhimmi status. Their position improved dramatically under the rule of Muhammad Ali in the early 19th century. He abolished the jizya (a tax on non-Muslims) and allowed Copts to enroll in the army. Pope Cyril IV, 1854–61, reformed the church and encouraged broader Coptic participation in Egyptian affairs. Khedive Isma'il Pasha, in power 1863–79, further promoted the Copts. He appointed them judges to Egyptian courts and awarded them political rights and representation in government. They flourished in business affairs.

Some Copts participated in the Egyptian national movement for independence and occupied many influential positions. Two significant cultural achievements include the founding of the Coptic Museum in 1910 and the Higher Institute of Coptic Studies in 1954. Some prominent Coptic thinkers from this period are Salama Moussa, Louis Awad and Secretary General of the Wafd Party Makram Ebeid.

In 1952, Gamal Abdel Nasser led some army officers in a coup d'état against King Farouk, which overthrew the Kingdom of Egypt and established a republic. Nasser's mainstream policy was pan-Arab nationalism and socialism. The Copts were severely affected by Nasser's nationalization policies, though they represented about 10–20% of the population. In addition, Nasser's pan-Arab policies undermined the Copts' strong attachment to and sense of identity about their Egyptian pre-Arab, and certainly non-Arab identity which resulted in permits to construct churches to be delayed along with Christian religious courts to be closed.

=== Pharaonism ===
Many Coptic intellectuals hold to "Pharaonism," which states that Coptic culture is largely derived from pre-Christian, Pharaonic culture, and is not indebted to Greece. It gives the Copts a claim to a deep heritage in Egyptian history and culture. Pharaonism was widely held by Coptic and Muslim scholars in the early 20th century, and it helped bridge the divide between those groups. However, some Western scholars today argue that Pharaonism was a late development shaped primarily by Orientalism, and doubt its validity.

== Persecution and discrimination in Egypt ==
Religious freedom in Egypt is hampered to varying degrees by discriminatory and restrictive government policies. Coptic Christians, being the largest religious minority in Egypt, are also negatively affected. Copts have faced increasing marginalization after the 1952 coup d'état led by Gamal Abdel Nasser. Until recently, Christians were required to obtain presidential approval for even minor repairs in churches. Although the law was eased in 2005 by handing down the authority of approval to the governors, Copts continue to face many obstacles and restrictions in building new churches. These restrictions do not apply for building mosques.

The Coptic community has been targeted with hate crimes by Islamic extremists. The most significant was the 1999–2000 El Kosheh attacks, in which Muslims and Christians were involved in bloody inter-religious clashes following a dispute between a Muslim and a Christian. "Twenty Christians and one Muslim were killed after violence broke out in the town of el-Kosheh, 440 kilometres (270 mi) south of Cairo". International Christian Concern reported that in February 2001, Muslims burned a new Egyptian church and the homes of 35 Christians, and that in April 2001 a 14-year-old Egyptian Christian girl was kidnapped because her parents were believed to be harboring a person who had converted from Islam to Christianity.

In 2006, one person attacked three churches in Alexandria, killing one person and injuring 5–16. The attacker was not linked to any organisation and described as "psychologically disturbed" by the Ministry of Interior. In May 2010, The Wall Street Journal reported increasing waves of mob attacks by Muslims against Copts. Despite frantic calls for help, the police typically arrived after the violence was over. The police also coerced the Copts to accept "reconciliation" with their attackers to avoid prosecuting them, with no Muslims convicted for any of the attacks. In Marsa Matrouh, a Bedouin mob of 3,000 Muslims tried to attack the city's Coptic population, with 400 Copts having to barricade themselves in their church while the mob destroyed 18 homes, 23 shops and 16 cars.

Journalist John R. Bradley writing around 2008 noted that

" ... other longstanding Coptic complaints include the under-representation of Christians in the police, judiciary, armed forces, civil service, government, and education system. There is also a virtual ban on access to state-controlled radio and television. One oft-cited example of official discrimination is a law that, until recently, required personal presidential approval to carry out even simple church repairs, such as fixing a toilet and which was blamed for delays of more than a decade in the issuing of permits to build churches. Mubarak eased the law in 2005, delegating such responsibility to local governors."

Members of U.S. Congress have expressed concern about "human trafficking" of Coptic women and girls who are victims of abductions, forced conversion to Islam, sexual exploitation and forced marriage to Muslim men.

Boutros Boutros-Ghali was a Copt who served as Egypt's foreign minister under President Anwar Sadat. During Mubarak regime, there were two Copts serving on Egypt's governmental cabinet: Finance Minister Youssef Boutros Ghali and Environment Minister Magued George. There was also one Coptic governor out of 25, that of the upper Egyptian governorate of Qena, and the first Coptic governor in a few decades. In addition, Naguib Sawiris, an extremely successful businessman, is a Copt who lived in Egypt during that era. In 2002, under the Mubarak government, Coptic Christmas (7 January) was recognized as an official holiday. However, many Copts continue to complain of being minimally represented in law enforcement, state security and public office, and of being discriminated against in the workforce on the basis of their religion. Most Copts do not support independence or separation movement from other Egyptians.

Copts are unrepresented and marginalized in Egyptian politics, bureaucracy, and society. Minorities at Risk reports that there are no Christian governors, university presidents, or deans in the country. Official and unofficial discrimination against Copts occurs in forms such as disadvantages in education and the judicial system, violence from Islamic militants, and restrictions on religious activity and expression.

While freedom of religion is guaranteed by the Egyptian constitution, according to Human Rights Watch, "Egyptians are able to convert to Islam generally without difficulty, but Muslims who convert to Christianity face difficulties in getting new identity papers and some have been arrested for allegedly forging such documents." The Coptic community, however, takes pains to prevent conversions from Christianity to Islam due to the ease with which Christians can often become Muslim. Public officials, being conservative themselves, intensify the complexity of the legal procedures required to recognize the religion change as required by law. Security agencies will sometimes claim that such conversions from Islam to Christianity (or occasionally vice versa) may stir social unrest, and thereby justify themselves in wrongfully detaining the subjects, insisting that they are simply taking steps to prevent likely social troubles from happening. In 2007, a Cairo administrative court denied 45 citizens the right to obtain identity papers documenting their reversion to Christianity after converting to Islam. However, in February 2008 the Supreme Administrative Court overturned the decision, allowing 12 citizens who had reverted to Christianity to re-list their religion on identity cards, but they will specify that they had adopted Islam for a brief period of time.

The Egyptian census of 1897 reported the percentage of Non-Muslims in Urban Provinces as 14.7% (13.2% Christians, 1.4% Jews). The Egyptian census of 1986 reported the percentage of Non-Muslims in Urban Provinces as 6.1% (5.7% Christians, 0% Jews). The decline in the Jewish representation is interpreted through the creation of the state of Israel, and the subsequent emigration of the Egyptian Jews. There is no explanation for a 55% decline in the percentage of Christians in Egypt. It has been suggested that Egyptian censuses held after 1952 have been politicized to under-represent the Christian population.

In August 2013, following the 3 July 2013 coup and clashes between the military and Morsi supporters, there were widespread attacks on Coptic churches and institutions in Egypt by Morsi supports. According to at least one Egyptian scholar (Samuel Tadros), the attacks are the worst violence against the Coptic Church since the 14th century.

USA Today reported that "forty churches have been looted and torched, while 23 others have been attacked and heavily damaged". The Facebook page of the Muslim Brotherhood's Freedom and Justice Party was "rife with false accusations meant to foment hatred against Copts", according to journalist Kirsten Powers. The party's page claimed that the Coptic Church had declared "war against Islam and Muslims" and that "The Pope of the Church is involved in the removal of the first elected Islamist president. The Pope of the Church alleges Islamic Sharia is backwards, stubborn, and reactionary." On 15 August, nine Egyptian human rights groups under the umbrella group "Egyptian Initiative for Personal Rights" released a statement saying,

In December … Brotherhood leaders began fomenting anti-Christian sectarian incitement. The anti-Coptic incitement and threats continued unabated up to the demonstrations of June 30 and, with the removal of President Morsi … morphed into sectarian violence, which was sanctioned by … the continued anti-Coptic rhetoric heard from the group's leaders on the stage … throughout the sit-in.

== Events related to Copts ==
An Egyptian court on 25 February 2016, convicted four Coptic Christian teenagers for contempt of Islam, after they appeared in a video mocking Muslim prayers.

== Notable Copts in Egypt ==
- Youssef Wahba
- Boutros Ghali
- Boutros Boutros-Ghali
- Youssef Boutros Ghali
- George Isaac (politician)
- Hany Ramzy
- Naguib Sawiris
- Mounir Fakhry Abdel Nour

== See also ==
- Coptic people
- Christianity in Egypt
- Persecution of Copts
- Religion in Egypt
- Demographics of Egypt
- Christianity in Sohag Governorate
- Coptic diaspora
- Copts in Sudan
- Copts in Libya
