= When We're Born =

2019 film

- Film poster
- Directed by: Tamer Ezzat
- Written by: Nadine Shams
- Produced by: Moataz Abdelwahab; Mohammed Alsaadi
- Starring: Amr Abed
- Cinematography: Rady Estmenkovic
- Edited by: Ibrahim Elhefnawy; Abdelhamed Emad; Michelle Yosef
- Music by: Sherif Elhawary; Hossam Hamdy
- Production companies: Tamer Ezzat Films; Team One Productions
- Release date: 21 September 2019
- Running time: 110 minutes
- Country: Egypt
- Language: Arabic

When We're Born (Arabic: لما بنتولد, romanized: Lammā Bantawallad) is a 2019 Egyptian musical drama film directed by Tamer Ezzat and written by Nadine Shams. It was selected as the Egyptian entry for the Best International Feature Film at the 93rd Academy Awards, but it was not nominated.

== Synopsis ==
Three stories about Egyptian life interlink.

== Cast ==
- Amr Abed as Amin
- Ibtihal Elserety as Aida
- Salma Hasan as Farah
- Mohamed Hatem as Osama
- Amir Eid as Ahmed
- Passant Shawky as Yara

== See also ==
- List of submissions to the 93rd Academy Awards for Best International Feature Film
- List of Egyptian submissions for the Academy Award for Best International Feature Film
