= Naguib Sawiris =

Egyptian businessman (born 1954)

Naguib Onsi Sawiris
- نجيب انسى ساويرس
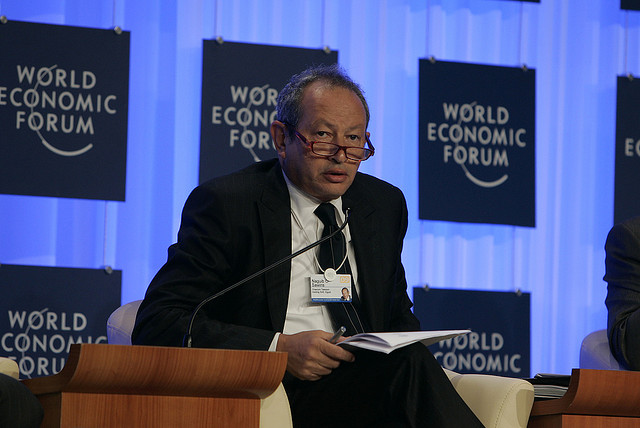
- Naguib Sawiris, 2009
- Born: 15 June 1954 (age 72); Cairo, Egypt
- Citizenship: Egypt; United States
- Education: ETH Zurich
- Occupation: Businessman
- Spouse: Ghada Gamil Sawiris
- Children: 4
- Father: Onsi Sawiris
- Relatives: Nassef Sawiris (brother); Samih Sawiris (brother)

Naguib Onsi Sawiris (Note: Arabic: نجيب انسى ساويرس [næˈɡiːb ˈʔonsi sæˈwiːɾɪs]; Coptic: Ⲛⲉⲅⲓⲃ Ⲟⲛⲥⲓ Ⲥⲉⲩⲏⲣⲟⲥ [sæˈwɪɾos]) (born 15 June 1954) is an Egyptian-American billionaire businessman. He is the chairman of Orascom Investment Holding and the former chairman and CEO of Orascom Telecom Holding.

== Early life ==
Naguib Onsi Sawiris was born in Cairo, Egypt to a Coptic family, members of the Coptic Orthodox Church. His mother is Yousriya Loza Sawiris and his father is businessman Onsi Sawiris. He has two younger brothers, Nassef and Samih, both of whom are also billionaires. He received a diploma from the German Evangelical School in Giza, and a diploma of mechanical engineering with a master's degree in technical administration from ETH Zurich.

== Political career ==
Sawiris founded the Free Egyptians Party in 2011. The party decided in late December 2016 at its annual party assembly, without Sawiris to eliminate its board of trustees, which Sawiris was a member of.

The board of trustees called for a postponement of the planned vote and called the vote a "coup"; the party was split between backers of Sawiris and party president Essam Khalil. Sawiris was dismissed from the party in February 2017, as he refused to appear before the party on charges that he insulted the board of trustees. However, according to Ragy Soliman, Sawiris remained a member of the party and the board of trustees.

== Business career ==
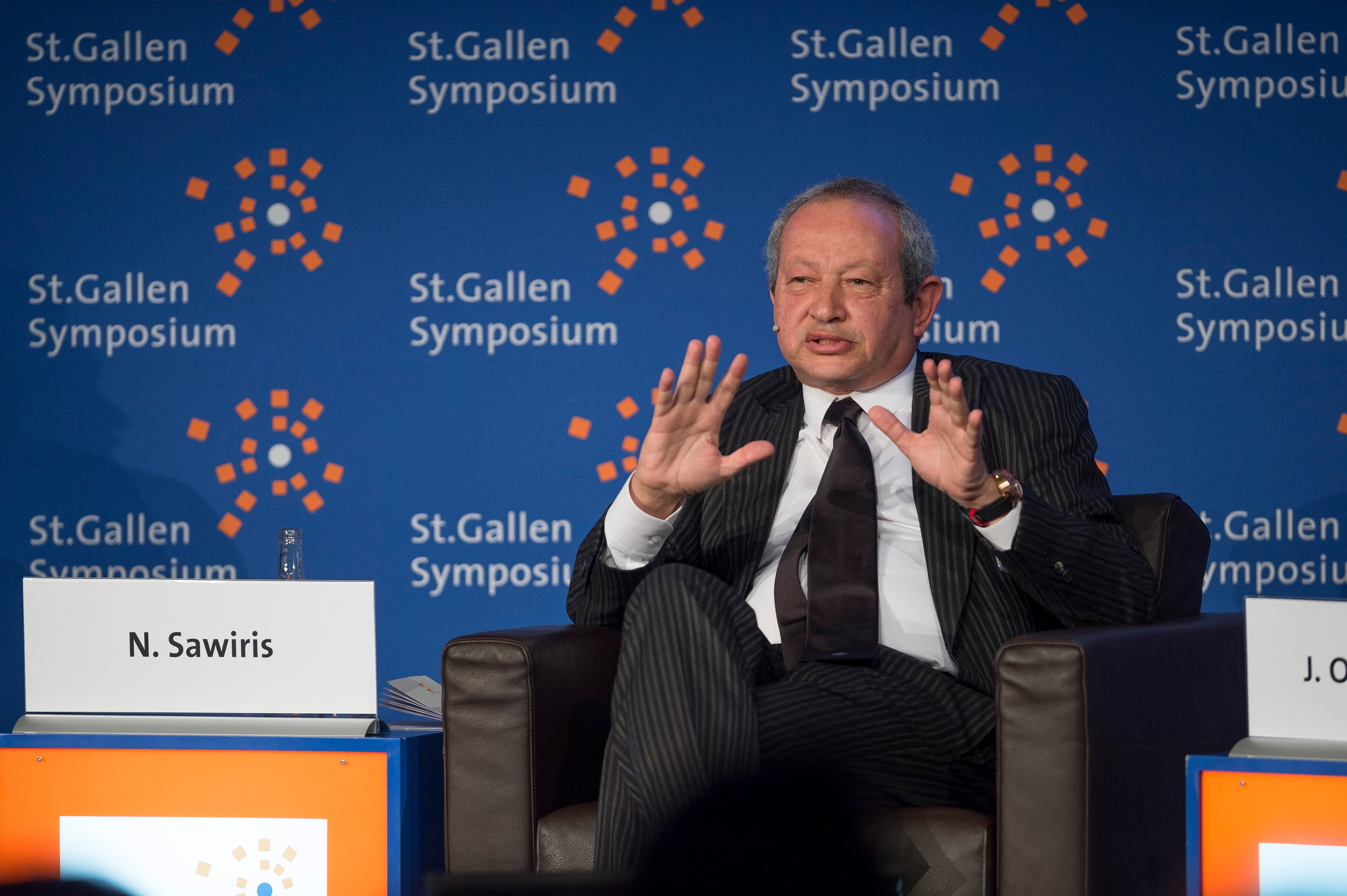
Naguib Sawiris, 2013.

Since joining Orascom, the family business, in 1979, Sawiris worked in the development of the railway, information technology, and telecommunications sectors of Orascom. Management decided to split Orascom into separate operating companies in the late 90s: Orascom Telecom Holding (OTH), Orascom Construction Industries (OCI), Orascom Hotels & Development and Orascom Technology Systems (OTS). Orascom Telecom Holding was established in 1997, and then Orascom Telecom Media and Technologies, in 2011, until the recent rebranding as Orascom Investment Holding (OIH), of which he is the Managing Director and CEO.

In August 2012, Sawiris was appointed chairman of La Mancha Holding.

In 2014, Sawiris raised more than US$4 billion when he sold his stake in his telecommunications companies to Russian company Vimplecom.

In early 2015, Sawiris bought a majority stake in the pan-European television channel Euronews. He remained as the main shareholder until beginning the process of selling his stake to Alpac Capital in December 2021.

In September 2015, he offered to buy an island off Greece or Italy to help hundreds of thousands of refugees fleeing the Syrian conflict. However, he conceded the plan could face challenges in terms of jurisdictions and customs regulation.

In May 2016, Sawiris sold his stake in the Egypt-based TV channel ONTV to Ahmed Abou Hashima.

In December 2016, Sawiris resigned as the CEO of Orascom Telecom Media & Technology.

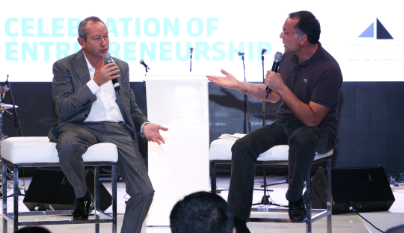
Naguib Sawiris, 2010.

The Ora Developers, formerly known as the Gemini Global Development, was launched in 2016. The company owns a $2.5 billion global real estate portfolio comprising the Silver Sands mixed-use project in Grenada, Ayia Napa Marina in Cyprus, and the Eighteen luxury residential project in Islamabad, Pakistan. In 2023, it was reported that Sawiris is considering an investment in Barrick Gold Corp's $7 billion Reko Diq copper-gold project in Pakistan.

In January 2024, the Iraqi government announced the signing of a contract with Ora Developers to develop the largest residential city in Iraq named "Ali Al-Wardi City". The planned new city, located approximately 25 km (16 miles) southeast of Baghdad and spanning a total area of 61 million m^{2} (660 million sq ft), includes "120,000 different housing units along with green spaces, urban amenities, and smart city technology to apply cutting-edge standards in sustainability and environmental preservation." The project is named after the Iraqi intellectual Ali Al-Wardi and aims to reduce population pressure on Baghdad.

=== Gold and mining ===
Sawiris made significant moves in the gold and mining sectors in recent years, primarily through his ownership of La Mancha, a mining investment firm. Sawiris has invested in gold and mining through La Mancha, including projects in Africa and other regions. Sawiris has been involved in acquiring and financing mining assets, aiming to capitalize on the rising value of gold. His company has also made strategic investments in gold exploration projects in countries like Canada and Côte d'Ivoire.

=== Djezzy ===
In the early 2000s, Sawiris's Orascom Telecom purchased a majority share in Algerian mobile network operator Djezzy. The company grew fast and became Orascom's most profitable subsidiary and one of Algeria's leading mobile service providers.

In 2008, the Algerian government declared its intention to increase its stake in Djezzy and take greater control over the telecommunications sector. Sawiris saw this as a direct challenge to his ownership and a violation of the agreement under which Orascom had invested in Algeria. Two years later, in 2010, Russian company VimpelCom (now VEON) acquired Orascom and merged with it for $6.4 billion. In 2012, Sawiris filed a lawsuit against the Algerian government at the International Centre for the Settlement of Investment Disputes (ICSID), claiming $4 billion in damages. He argued that the government had waged a campaign of interference and harassment, ultimately forcing him to sell the company for a much lower price through the merger with VimpelCom. The dispute came to an end in 2014 when VimpelCom agreed to sell a 51% stake in Djezzy to the Algerian National Investment Fund (FNI) for $2.64 billion. In 2017, however, the ICSID ruled in favor of the Algerian government, dismissing Sawiris's $4 billion claim.

== Personal life ==
Sawiris and his wife, Ghada Gamil Sawiris, have four children together.

Sawiris is fluent in Arabic, English, and German, and speaks some French. As of 2025, Forbes estimates his personal wealth at $5 billion.

== Honours ==
- Egypt: Grand Officer of the Order of Merit.
- France: Commander of the Legion of Honour (2012 ; Officier on 2007).
- Italy: Grand Officer of the Order of the Star of Italy (2026 ; Commander on 2011).
- Pakistan: First Class of the Order of Excellence (2006).
