= Aida el Ayoubi =

Egyptian musician

Aida el Ayoubi (Arabic: عايدة الأيوبي; born 1964) is an Egyptian singer, songwriter, and guitarist.

== Biography ==
Born in Aachen, Germany, to an Egyptian father and German mother, El-Ayoubi studied at the Deutsche Evangelische Oberschule, then at The American University in Cairo where she majored in computer sciences.

She is known for her many Egyptian patriotic songs.

El-Ayoubi completed three albums before going into a career hiatus following the birth of her first child. She is known in Egypt for her patriotic and romantic music, lyrics, and her voice. She is best known for her hit song "A'ala Baly" which appeared on her first album.

== Comeback ==
After more than ten years in retirement, El-Ayoubi produced a new three-track album, Tawasul wa Ragaa’ bi Jah Sidna. It is entirely religion-themed.

In 2011, El-Ayoubi released a single, Bahebek Yabaldy, after the Egyptian Revolution, and Ya El Midan featuring Cairokee, which is also about the Egyptian Revolution in Tahrir Square in January 2011. She took part in another duet with Cairokee, producing the soundtrack to a 2013 media campaign launched by Coca-Cola.

== Albums ==
- Ala Bali 1991
- Men Zaman 1993
- Rafiq Omri 1996
