= Deutsche Evangelische Oberschule =

Private school in Giza, Egypt

DEO Kairo
- Deutsche Evangelische Oberschule Kario (DEO)
- Dokki, Giza

Information
- School type: Private
- Religious affiliation: Teaches Islam/Christianity
- Founded: 1873
- Status: Open
- Principal: Dr. Christian Dern
- Staff: c. 200
- Teaching staff: 120
- Enrollment: 1,400 (2010)
- Classes: 1–12
- Average class size: 25
- Education system: German/Arabic
- Language: German, Arabic, English, French
- Slogan: Einmal DEO, immer DEO
- Accreditation: German International Abitur
- Newspaper: DeoLino: 1-4, "The Voice" and "Die Schülerzeitung": 5-12
- School fees: 114,000 - 164,000 LE (8,125 EUR for Germans), (10,209 EUR for other Nationalities)
- Revenue: Unknown
- Alumni: Naguib Sawiris, Samih Sawiris, Nassef Sawirirs, Nesma Mahgoub, Sherif ElGhamrawy, Mohammed ElSawy, Ayman Hakky, Dr. Tarek Sayed Tawfiq, Dr. Soheir Hawass, Amr Hamzawy
- Website: https://Deokairo.com

Deutsche Evangelische Oberschule (DEO; Arabic: المدرسة الألمانیة الإنجیلیة الثانویة بالقاهرة) (German Evangelical High School) is a German school in Dokki, Giza, Egypt, in the Cairo metropolitan area. It is operated by the German Protestant community of Cairo.

== History ==
The initiative for a school was established by the Protestant congregation of Cairo. The school was built along with a rectory in the spring of 1873 on land given to the Prussian consul von Theremin by the Khedive Ismail. The language of instruction was French with 15 students attending. On 2 February 1878, there was a dispute about the school's ownership between the church and the school, which resulted in the school's becoming community owned and adding optional Arabic lessons. In 1880, the school further expanded to include 89 students in three classes. There were students of different nationalities with 28 Turks, 19 Egyptians, ten Italians, five Germans, five Swiss, five French, four Syrians, three English, three Scots, three Levantines and one each Austrian, Greek, Persian and Armenian. The school had students of different religions: 41 Muslim students, 19 Protestant, 14 Roman Catholic, seven Jewish, seven Coptic and one Greek Orthodox. After the English conquered Egypt in 1882, English courses were added to the school's curriculum. In 1908, the school was relocated to Boulaq with primary and secondary education facilities. A year later, their first "Einjährigenexamen" (a German secondary education exam) was made before the German examination committee.

Due to the First World War, students stopped going to school and by November 1914 the school was shut down. In 1920, England liquidated all the German properties including the community properties in Egypt. On 17 February 1930, the school was reopened with five students attending. In July 1933, the school was relocated to its old location. By 1939, the school had 13 classes with 130 students, but had to be closed again due to the start of the Second World War.

On 12 January 1953, the school was reopened with 18 students attending and the addition of a newly established kindergarten. The first director of the school was Artur Hachmeister. The school was than moved to Dr.-Mahmoud-Azmi-Straße 2 in Zamalek. The first "Reifeprüfung" (high school exam) was done by three female and three male students. On 1 October 1956, an Islam course was added to the school's curriculum which was required by the Egyptian government as of 26 June 1956. In 1957, Arabic was made a compulsory course for all students attending the school. The graduates of the school were eligible to attend Egyptian universities by January 1958. In 1959, the school's first Arabic division director, Auni Abder Rauf, was appointed. On 1 March 1977, the school was relocated to Dokki. In 2001, the school added a new course called "koeducative" religion for Muslim and Christian students.

== Notable former students ==
- Naguib Sawiris, entrepreneur
- Nassef Sawiris, entrepreneur
- Aida el Ayoubi, singer, songwriter and guitarist

== Notable visitors ==
- On 22 March 1974, Germany's Chancellor Willy Brandt visited the school.
- On 27 February 1978, Germany's Chancellor Helmut Schmidt visited the school.
- In 1981, Egyptian president Anwar Sadat and his wife Jehan Sadat visited the school.
- In October 1984, Germany's President Richard von Weizsäcker visited the school.
- On 22 February 2000, Germany's President Johannes Rau visited the school.
- On 29 October 2019, Germany's Foreign Minister Heiko Maas visited the school.
