= Ahmed Said (footballer) =

Egyptian footballer (born 1984)

Ahmed Said (Okka)
Personal information
- Full name: Ahmed Said
- Date of birth: 13 March 1984 (age 42)
- Place of birth: Cairo, Egypt
- Height: 1.86 m (6 ft 1 in)
- Position: Centre-back

Youth career
- El Shams

Senior career*
| Years | Team | Apps | (Gls) |
| 2004–2005 | El Shams | 33 | (5) |
| 2005–2006 | Ismaily | 22 | (3) |
| 2006–2012 | Haras El Hodood | 224 | (16) |
| 2012–2013 | Wadi Degla | 0 | (0) |
| 2012–2013 | → Lierse (loan) | 18 | (2) |
| 2013–2016 | Smouha | 53 | (3) |
| 2016–2016 | Misr Lel Makkasa | 7 | (0) |
| 2016–2017 | El Entag El Harby SC | 19 | (0) |
| 2017–2018 | Pyramids | 30 | (1) |
| 2018–2019 | El Gouna | 24 | (2) |
| 2019–2021 | ZED | 26 | (0) |

International career
| 2009–2014 | Egypt | 32 | (1) |
- * Club domestic league appearances and goals

Ahmed Said, sometimes addressed by his nickname Okka, is a former Egyptian football player. He was selected a part of the Egypt national team for the 2009 Confederations Cup under Hassan Shehata and participated in all of the 3 matches of the first round. He has also been selected a part of the Egypt national team under new coach Bob Bradley, however his appearances have been few.
