= Khaled Sobhi =

Egyptian footballer (born 1995)

Personal information
- Full name: Khaled Sobhi Ahmed Ahmed
- Date of birth: 3 May 1995 (age 31)
- Place of birth: Ismailia, Egypt
- Height: 1.87 m (6 ft 2 in)
- Position: Centre-back

Team information
- Current team: Al Masry
- Number: 5

Youth career
- Ismaily

Senior career*
Years	Team	Apps	(Gls)
2014–2016	Ismaily	2	(0)
2015–2016	→ Aswan (loan)	2	(0)
2016–2017	El Qanah	0	(0)
2017–2020	El Gouna	32	(0)
2020–2024	Ceramica Cleopatra	62	(0)
2022–2023	→ Al Ittihad Alexandria (loan)	23	(2)
2024–	Al Masry	18	(1)

International career^{‡}
2024–	Egypt	3	(0)
- * Club domestic league appearances and goals as of 15:22, 2 September 2025 (UTC) ‡ National team caps and goals as of 15:22, 2 September 2025 (UTC)

Khaled Sobhi Ahmed Ahmed (Arabic: خالد صبحى; born 3 May 1995) is an Egyptian professional footballer who plays as a centre-back for Egyptian Premier League club Al Masry, and the Egypt national team.

== Club career ==
Sobhi is a product of the youth academy of Ismaily, and began his senior career with them in the Egyptian Premier League in 2014. He joined Aswan on loan for the 2015–2016 season. He had a stint in the Egyptian Second Division with El Qanah and then El Gouna, helping El Gouna get promoted in his second season. In 2020, he transferred to Ceramica Cleopatra, where he helped them win the 2023–24 Egyptian League Cup.On 13 September 2024, he transferred to Al Masry.

== International career ==
On 9 November 2022, Sobhi received his first call-up to the Egypt national team. He was again called out for a set of 2025 Africa Cup of Nations qualification matches in September 2024. He debuted with Egypt in a 4–0 win over Botswana on 10 September 2024.

On 2 December 2025, Sobhi was called up to the Egypt squad for the 2025 Africa Cup of Nations.

== Personal life ==
Sobhi is married and has a son.

== Honours ==
Ceramica Cleopatra

- Egyptian League Cup: 2023–24
