= Louay Wael =

Egyptian footballer (born 1992)

Personal information
- Full name: Louay Wael Mohamed Badr
- Date of birth: 4 June 1992 (age 34)
- Place of birth: Cairo, Egypt
- Height: 1.83 m (6 ft 0 in)
- Position: Center back

Team information
- Current team: Al-Mokawloon Al-Arab SC
- Number: 5

Youth career
- 1999–2013: Al Ahly

Senior career*
Years	Team	Apps	(Gls)
2013–2014	KV Turnhout	1	(0)
2014	Lierse	2	(0)
2014–2015	Al Ahly	2	(0)
2015–18	El Entag El Harby	0	(0)
2018-22	El Gouna FC	81	(7)
2021-	Al-Mokawloon Al-Arab SC	28	(1)
- * Club domestic league appearances and goals as of 23/8/25 @ 10:10(AEST)

Louay Wael Mohamed Badr (Arabic: لُؤَيّ وَائِل مُحَمَّد بَدْر; born 4 June 1992) commonly known as Luca Badr is an Egyptian professional footballer who plays for Egyptian Premier League club El Entag El Harby.

== Career ==
Badr has previously played for Belgian Pro League side Lierse S.K. and Egyptian giants Al Ahly.

On 27 April 2014, Badr made his full debut in Belgian Pro League with Lierse S.K. in 2013–14 Belgian Pro League 4–2 won over Waasland-Beveren. It was Badr's second game for Lierse S.K., having came on as an 85th-minute substitute in their previous game against KV Oostende. Badr joined Al-Ahly in June 2014.
