= Islam Roshdi =

Egyptian footballer (born 1989)

Personal information
- Full name: Islam Hassan Roshdi Zayed
- Date of birth: 26 July 1989 (age 37)
- Place of birth: Egypt
- Height: 1.75 m (5 ft 9 in)
- Position: Attacking midfielder

Team information
- Current team: El Gouna
- Number: 10

Youth career
- El Minya

Senior career*
Years	Team	Apps	(Gls)
2009–2014	El Minya	14	(2)
2014–2016	Al-Ahly	8	(2)
2015–2016	→ Haras El-Hodood (loan)	14	(1)
2016–2018	El Entag El Harby	46	(2)
2018–	El Gouna	10	(4)
- * Club domestic league appearances and goals

Islam Roshdi (Arabic: اسلام رشدى) (born 26 July 1989) is an Egyptian footballer playing for Egyptian club El Gouna. He primarily plays as an attacking midfielder.
