= Special Ops (band) =

Rock Band (formed 2002)

Special Ops is a Canadian hard rock band from Montreal, Canada, first formed in 2002. The band is currently composed of Lead Singer Abe Froman, Guitarist Weka Soliman, Bassist Waldo Thornhill, Guitarist Hedi Baly and Drummer Lance du Jour aka( Mike Rien).

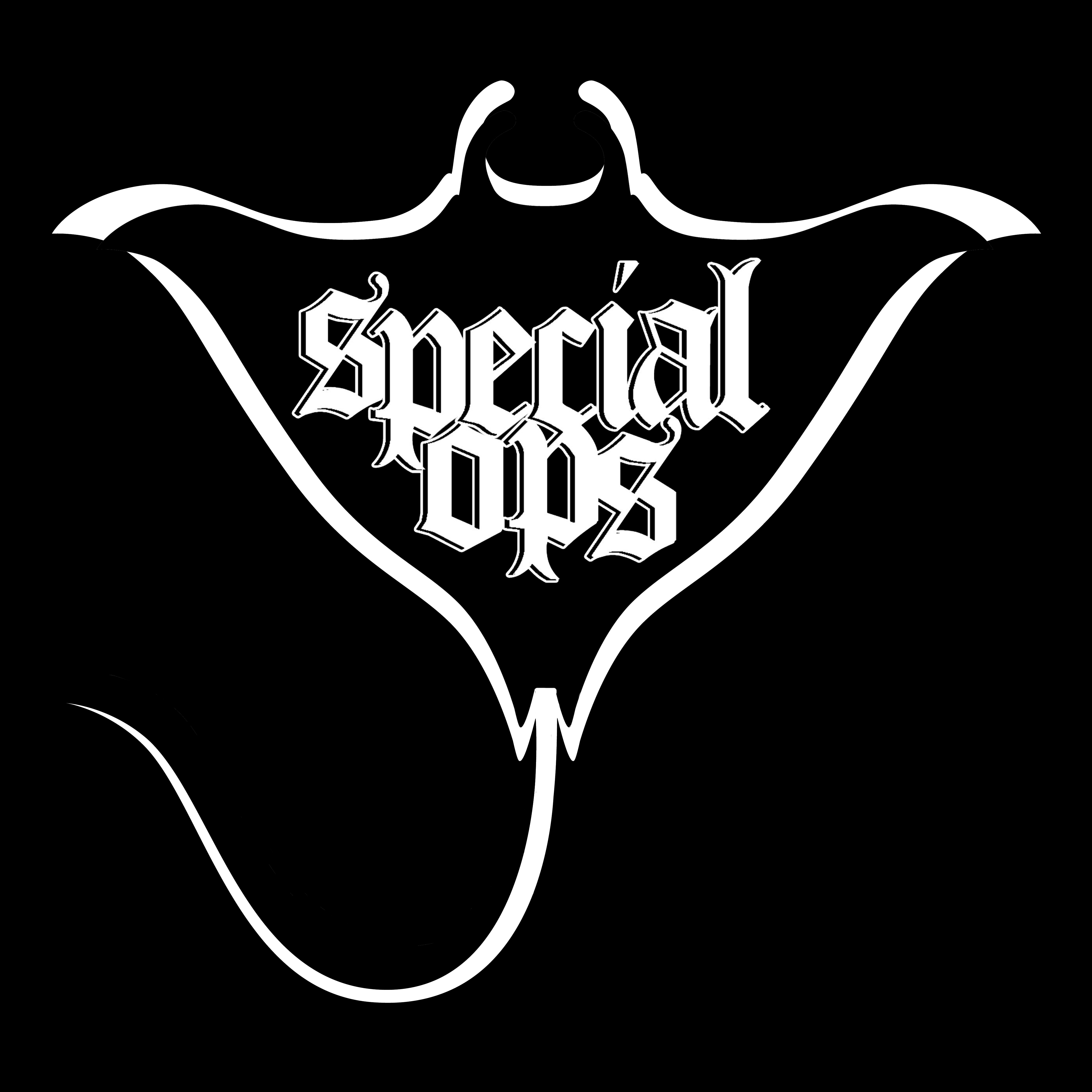

Special Ops is known for its diverse sound, influenced by a range of jazz, 80s metal, and Middle Eastern strumming techniques. The band achieved considerable success in the early 2000s with their song "Anger's Creeping", which became the main theme for Spike TV's first two seasons of Sid's Cycle Show. Their song "Emily" gained similar acclaim when it was used as the soundtrack to Annabelle Cosmetics's Video Tutorial, 'How to create Custom QUAD FOXY Browns Look'.

The band's third album, Through the Heart of the Infidel, was written shortly after Waldo Thornhill's cancer diagnosis in 2012. Special Ops disbanded, taking a four-year hiatus after releasing their live album Live and Kicking (to let their fans know they will be back) before returning in 2016 with their EP Tangents. Though Tangents continued with their distinct blend of heavy metal, new age metal, and nu metal, Their most recent Single, Baby Take It All marked a shift towards a more mainstream, radio-friendly sound. The music video for the titular track, “Baby Take It All,” premiered on Metal Injection and has since received over thirty thousand views on YouTube. "Baby Take It All" was their second 2017 video release that had followed the launch of a music video for “Anger’s Creeping”. Special Ops returned on November 24, 2019, with a fresh new album dubbed “Blood And Tears”. In this self-produced 9th release to be followed by the second single "Dead Are Calling" before the full-length album and last single "I Put A Spell On You", along with Grammy & Multi Platinum award-winning Producer Steve Pageot, Mixing engineer Darius Szezepaniak and Mastered by Kevin Jardine Slaves on Dope guitarist.

== Charts & Accomplishments ==
- I Put A Spell On You #12 on World Indie Music Charts 04-12-2020
- I Put A Spell On You #46 on Euro Indie Music Charts 04-12-2020
- Blood And Tears #06 on CJLO 03-06-2020
- Blood And Tears #08 on CHSR 02-18-2020
- I Put A Spell On You #13 on DRT GLOBAL TOP 50 ROCK AIRPLAY CHART 03-04-2020
- I Put A Spell On You #104 on DRT GLOBAL TOP 150 INDEPENDENT AIRPLAY CHART 01-06-2020
- Rotation on 150+ Radio stations worldwide (Satellite, FM, AM and Digital) 2020
- Dead Are Calling #1 Rock / Pop Rock Charts Berkshire Media Group (KMIX LA & affiliates) 2018
- Dead Are Calling#1 Rock / Pop Rock Charts WNYR New York 2018
- Winner – Best Alt Rock song - Dead Are Calling 2018
- Take It All Tour Endorsements by Godin, Serin Bass, Autopsy Report radio show, 247 Inkmag, ++
- Winner – Best Provincial Rock Video – Pressure
- Through The Heart of The Infidel #16 on CFBX 92.5FM 06-06-2010
- Toronto Exclusive Magazine Awards 2009
- Independent Music Awards winner Through The Heart 2009
- Winner – Best Metal Group – New Music Awards 2009
- Nominated at Toronto Exclusive Magazine Awards 2008 (Best Rock song, Best Rock Album, Best Rock Group)
- Anger is Creeping- # 2 on CSCR 12-01-2008

== Style and influences ==
Special Ops has claimed that their sound incorporates elements of metal, rock, reggae, jazz, hip hop, Middle Eastern, and Classical, likening their process to Fish Bone's and Faith No More's. The group has also cited Nina Simone and other jazz artists among their influences.

Special Ops earlier work has been compared to Metallica, Slipknot, and Disturbed as well as System of a Down, Godsmack, Evanescence, and Nirvana. Their more recent, hard rock sound has been likened to, Monster Magnet and Eagles of Death Metal.

Special Ops uses a mix of vintage and modern gear, including Charvel, Jackson, and Gibson guitars, Mesa and Marshall amplifiers, and custom Warwick and Surine basses.

== Members ==
=== Current ===
- Abe Froman - Vocals
- Weka Soliman - Lead Guitar
- Waldo Thornhill - Bass
- Lance du Jour - Drums
- Hedi Baly - Guitar

=== Former ===
- Akbar Jhonson - Vocals & Guitars
- Clarence Mcgillacutty - Drums
- Manu Bassett - Drums
- Dante Sanchez - Drums
- Conrad Bevins - Drums
- Duke Spellenberger - Guitars
- Sven Dargehart - Guitars
- Hans Klopeck - Guitars
- Late Louis Levesque - Drums & Percussion

== Discography ==
- Emily - EP (2003)
- Phase 1: In Search of Madness (2005)
- Phase 2: Amidst the Madness (2007)
- Pressure - Single (2009)
- Through the Heart of the Infidel (2009)
- Live & Kicking (2012)
- Tangents (2016)
- Baby Take It All - Single (2017)
- Blood And Tears (2019)
- Smoke & Mirrors (2022)
- Set Me Free (2022)
