= Cairokee =

Egyptian rock band

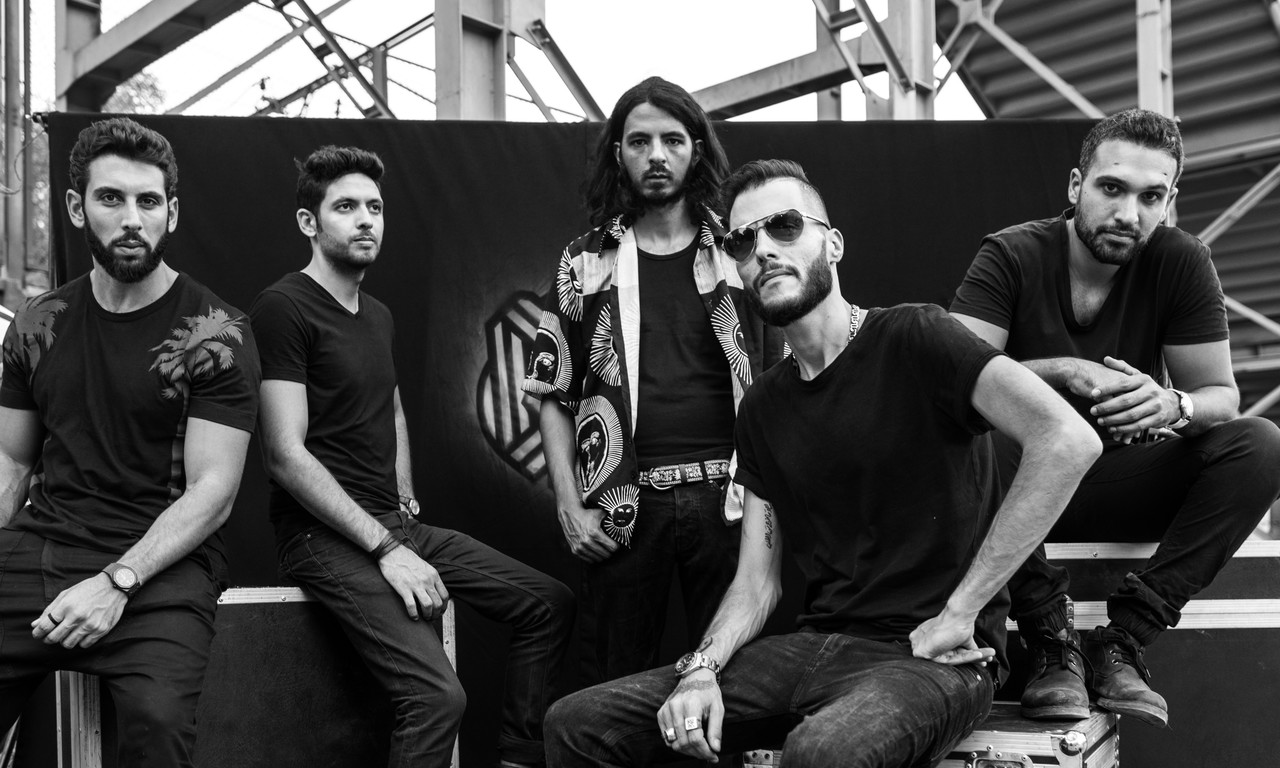
- Members from left to right: Tamer Hashem - Sherif Mostafa- Sherif El Hawary -Amir Eid - Adam El-Alfy

Background information
- Origin: Cairo, Egypt
- Genres: Egyptian, rock
- Years active: 2003–present
- Members: Amir Eid; Sherif El Hawary; Tamer Hashem; Sherif Mostafa; Adam El-Alfy

Cairokee is an Egyptian rock band that was officially launched in 2003 but came to prominence with its revolutionary music following the Egyptian Revolution of 2011 due to its politically-inspired lyrics and protest songs released following the uprising. Their signature song "Ya El Midan", featuring Aida el Ayoubi, who had retired in the 1990s, ranked number one on Facebook worldwide for downloads and number eight on YouTube.

== Background ==
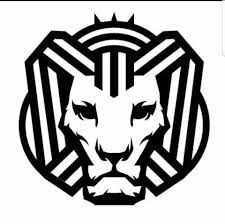
Cairokee's Official Logo - Circa. 2018

The band consists of Amir Eid (lead vocalist), Sherif Hawary (lead guitarist), Tamer Hashem (drummer), Sherif Mostafa (keyboardist), and Adam el-Alfy (bass guitarist). The initial band members were friends ever since their school days, and Tamer was already a drummer back then. In 2003, Eid and Hawary had started an English band initially called Black Star. They started playing covers of English songs, with only one Egyptian song called "Ghariba" that was highly admired by their audiences. They later decided to continue making Egyptian songs because they felt it was shameful to keep playing English music as it wasn't their mother tongue. They were mainly influenced by the works of Pink Floyd and The Beatles and regard Pink Floyd's music as an inspiration for their own musical career.

== Career ==
Following the 2011 revolution, Cairokee released their first major hit, "Sout El Horeya" (The Voice of Freedom), a powerful anthem made in collaboration with Hany Adel of the band Wust El-Balad. The song's music video, filmed in Tahrir Square, became a viral phenomenon, reportedly breaking world records for its millions of views in a short period of time. They continued to capture the revolutionary spirit with "Ya El Midan" (Oh, The Square), which marked the return of veteran singer Aida El Ayoubi after a 20-year hiatus. The song personified Tahrir Square as a fellow protester, and its music video subtly documented the revolution from a protester's home, showing items used to combat tear gas and other protest-related gear, addressing and personifying it as another living and breathing member of the opposition, and its video clip documented the latest protests in an indirect way as the camera was apparently filming inside a protester's house and it roamed over clothes riddled with bullet holes, medical white coats, onions and types vinegar (substances that defuse the effects of teargas). Cairokee's momentum culminated in their first album, Matloob Zaeem (Leader Wanted), released in June 2011. The title track was a massive hit, serving as a social commentary on the qualities the next leader of the country should possess. A year later, on the revolution's anniversary, they released "Ethbat Makanak" (Hold Your Ground), featuring prominent satirist Bassem Youssef. The collaboration was a show of support for independent media voices who were under attack by the military government. The band's role in the public sphere continued through the 2013 protests. They performed in front of hundreds of thousands of people who were protesting against then-President Mohamed Morsi. The crowd sang along with them, turning the performance into a powerful display of unity and opposition.

On 21 March 2013, Red Bull organized an event in which Cairokee played against Wust El-Balad dubbed "Red Bull Sound Clash" where the spectators were the judge and the winner would be declared according to the intensity of the crowd's cheering. Daily News Egypt noted that "it was clear from the beginning of the evening that Cairokee had the edge on crowd support, although Wust El-Balad had a strong fan base at the event". The concert also featured popular shaabi singer Ahmed Adaweyah who performed in Wust E-Balad's act and at the end of the event, no victor was announced but the spectators were apparently left highly satisfied with both performances. Cairokee also performed at the Jordanian Dum Tak Alternative Middle Eastern Music Festival, along with several Egyptian bands including Wust El-Balad and Massar Egbari as well as many other Middle Eastern bands such as Lebanon's Mashrou' Leila.

In early 2014, Cairokee released their third album "El Sekka Shemal". The album featured collaborations with different artists, including Algerian singer Souad Massi, Abdel Baset Hammouda and Zap Tharwat. This year also brought Cairokee to the record label Sony Music Middle East. The partnership led to the band obtaining its own Vevo channel on YouTube, the first deal of its kind for any artist in the region. The album was their most successful to date, with its first copy entirely sold out in the first three days only, topping the charts on the iTunes Store and in the music market of Egypt and the Middle East. It became the album with the highest number of downloads and purchases on iTunes by the end of the first week. It was also featured in the first episode of the third season of Bassem Youssef's highly popular show El Bernameg.

On July 20, 2017, Cairokee's album Nokta Beeda (White Dot), was a significant project that moved to a more mature and introspective sound. The album's central theme was finding a glimmer of hope in a chaotic world. Its biggest event was the groundbreaking collaboration with Egyptian folk singer Tarek El Sheikh on the hit song "El Keif." This fusion of rock and traditional music was a massive success, helping the album earn critical acclaim and solidify the band's status as a leading force in modern Arab music.

On March 21, 2019, Cairokee's album The Ugly Ducklings (أبناء البطة السوداء) was a deeply personal and raw project. The album's central theme, as its title suggests, revolves around a sense of social alienation and the struggle to find one's identity. With a more stripped-down and melancholic sound, the album was celebrated for its poetic lyrics and emotional honesty. It resonated with a generation feeling a similar sense of being different or not fitting in. The Ugly Ducklings was another critical success for the band, reinforcing their reputation for tackling existential and social themes with authenticity.

On September 23, 2022, The release of Cairokee's new album "Roma" was a major event for the Egyptian rock band. The album marked a significant shift from their earlier political themes to a more personal and introspective sound, exploring topics like nostalgia, anxiety, and personal struggles. The album's success was driven by several key factors, High-profile collaborations with artists like rapper Marwan Pablo and singer Sara Moullablad, which introduced new musical styles. An effective promotional campaign that included releasing popular music videos on YouTube and hosting an innovative, interactive online concert called "Cairokee Empire". A major international tour that included sold-out shows in Europe and the U.S., proving the band's growing global appeal. "Roma" was a meticulously planned release that showcased the band's artistic evolution and solidified their position as a leading force in Arab music.

== Members ==
Amir Eid, the main vocalist of the band, and the most influential member, so much so that he became an independent identity apart from the band.

Sherif El Hawary, the main guitarist of the band.

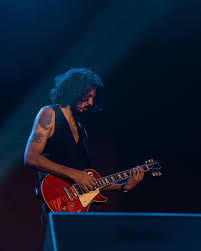
Sherif El-Hawary

Tamer Hashem, the main drummer of the band.

Sherif Mostafa, the main keyboardist and guitarist of the band.

Adam El-Alfy, the main bassist and guitarist of the band.

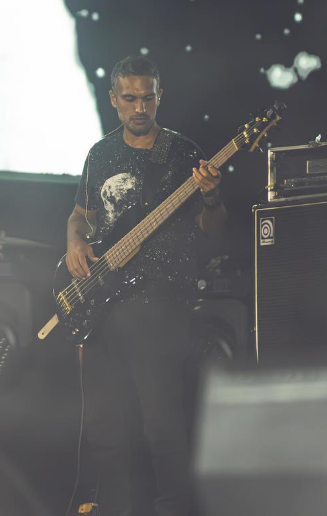
Adam EL-Alfy

== Discography ==
Studio Albums

- Matloob Zaeem (مطلوب زعيم) (2011)
- Wana Maa Nafsy Aad (وانا مع نفسي قاعد) (2012)
- El Sekka Shemal (السكة شمال) (2014)
- Nas w Nas (ناس و ناس) (2015)
- Nokta Beeda (نقطة بيضاء) (2017)
- The Ugly Ducklings (أبناء البطة السوداء) (2019)
- Roma (روما ) (2022)
- Supernova (سوبرنوڤا) (2026)
