= Mohamed Mohsen Leila =

Egyptian footballer (born 1995)

Leila
Personal information
- Full name: Mohamed Mohsen Leila
- Date of birth: January 24, 1995 (age 31)
- Place of birth: Port Said, Egypt
- Height: 1.87 m (6 ft 2 in)
- Position: Defensive midfielder

Team information
- Current team: Al-Jazeera
- Number: 3

Senior career*
Years	Team	Apps	(Gls)
–2014	Petrojet		
2014–2015	Marítimo B		
2015–2018	El-Entag El-Harby		
2018–2020	El Gouna		
2020–2021	Smouha		
2021–2022	Misr Lel Makkasa		
2022–2023	Al Mokawloon Al Arab		
2024	ENPPI		
2024–2025	El Dakhleya		
2026–	Al-Jazeera	2	(0)
- * Club domestic league appearances and goals as of 30 January 2026

Mohamed Mohsen Leila (Arabic: محمد محسن ليلة; born January 24, 1995) is an Egyptian professional footballer who plays as a defensive midfielder for Jordanian Pro League club Al-Jazeera. In 2015, Leila signed a 3-year contract for El-Entag moving from C.S. Marítimo B.
