= Ahmed Magdy (footballer, born 1989) =

Egyptian footballer (born 1989)

Personal information
- Full name: Ahmed Magdy Saad Mohamed
- Date of birth: 9 December 1989 (age 36)
- Place of birth: Mahalla, Gharbia, Egypt
- Height: 1.72 m (5 ft 8 in)
- Positions: Winger; attacking midfielder

Team information
- Current team: Ghazl El Mahalla SC
- Number: 18

Youth career
- Ghazl El Mahalla SC

Senior career*
Years	Team	Apps	(Gls)
2007–2013	Ghazl El Mahalla	40	(3)
2013–2014	Smouha	5	(0)
2014–2015	Wadi Degla	5	(0)
2015	→ El Gouna (loan)	18	(0)
2015–2017	Entag El Harby	47	(3)
2017	→ Al Wehda (loan)	10	(0)
2017–2018	Zamalek	2	(0)
2018	El-Makkasa	1	(0)
2018–2020	El Gouna	32	(2)
2020–2021	Al Mokawloon Al Arab SC	7	(0)
2021-22	Pioneers FC	0	(0)
2022-23	Petrojet FC	0	(0)
2023-	Ghazl El-Mahalla	2	(0)

International career^{‡}
2008	Egypt U20		
2012	Egypt U23		
2016–	Egypt	5	(0)
- * Club domestic league appearances and goals ‡ National team caps and goals as of 20:07, 12 May 2019 (UTC)

Ahmed Magdy Saad Mohamed (Arabic: أحـمد مجـدي سعد محمد; born 9 December 1989) is an Egyptian footballer who played for El Gouna FC and the Egypt national team as a winger or attacking midfielder. He played for Egypt at the 2012 Summer Olympics.

He has been a free agent since mid 2022 playing last for Eastern Company FC.
