= Christianity in Minya Governorate =

Christianity is the religion of large part of the population in Minya Governorate in Egypt. The Copts made up 19.4% of the population in the year 1914 and even today they form the majority in some parts of the governorate, as Copts presently account approximately 40% of Minya Government region. There exists a Minya eparchy of the Coptic Catholic Church, which is part of the Roman Catholic Church. Antonios Naguib, the Patriarch of Alexandria of the Copts, was born in Salamout in 1935. The area also has a quite large Protestant population.

== Coptic-Muslim relations ==
After living peacefully for centuries under the recurrent Islamic governments, and after several shady influences exerted on both Muslims and Copts, more than 10,000 Copts marched in January 2011, demanding the governor Ahmed Dia-el-Din to step down as he wanted to demolish a welfare centre for the disabled in the village of Deir Barsha, due to its being deemed uninhabitable. In the village Bani Ahmed, a Coptic church was destroyed by alleged Salafists. There have been clashes between Copts and Muslims. Abu Fana monastery (which has been run as a separate government) in Minya Governorate was attacked in 2008 by Bedouins from surrounding villages.
