= Samih Sawiris =

Egyptian businessman (born 1957)

- سميح أنسي ساويرس
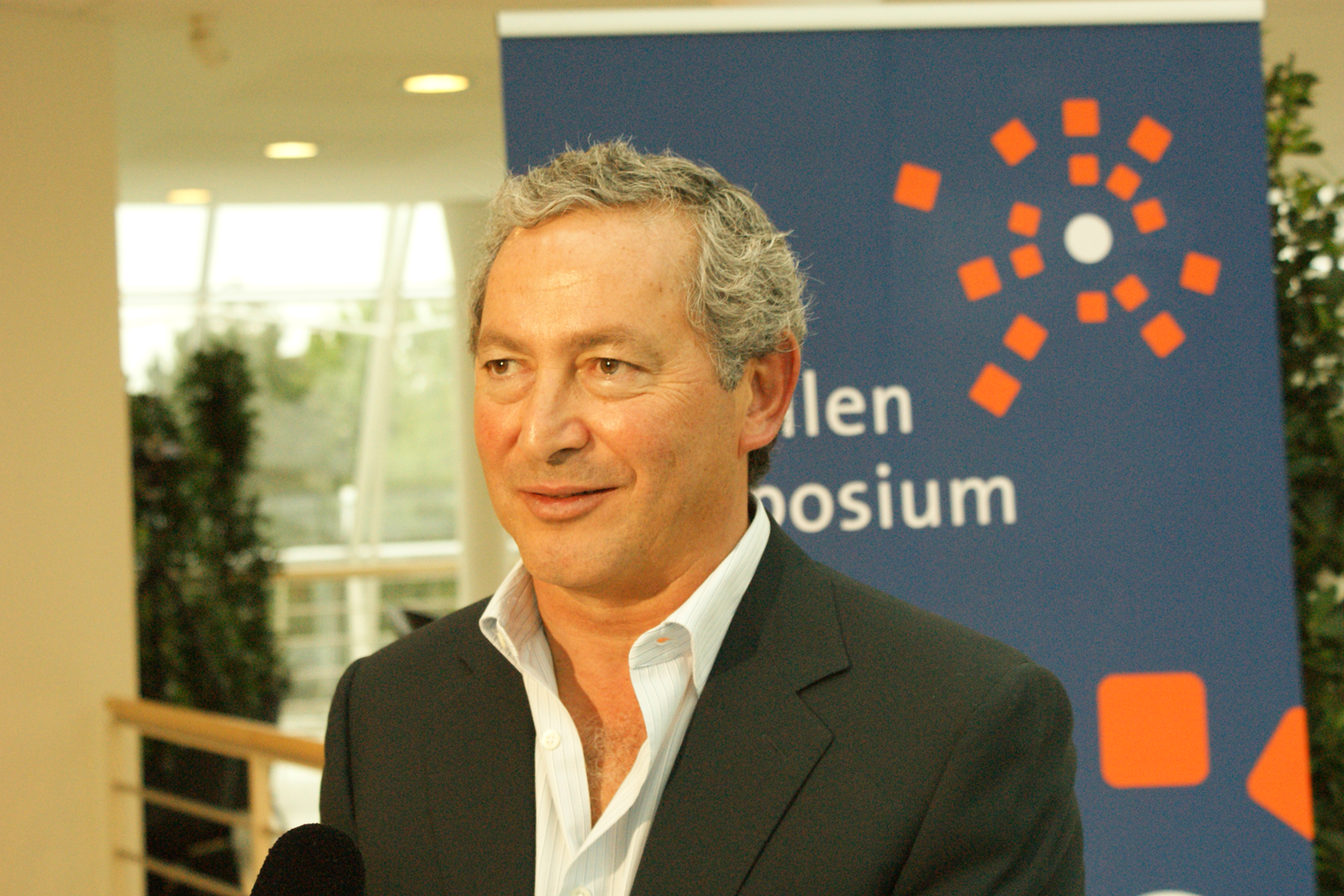
- Sawiris in 2010

Executive Chairman and CEO of Orascom Development Holding AG
- Incumbent
- Assumed office 1998-

Chairman of El Gouna FC
- Incumbent
- Assumed office 2003-

Board member of FC Luzern
- Incumbent
- Assumed office 2011-

Personal details
- Born: 28 January 1957 (age 69) Sohag, Egypt
- Citizenship: Egypt (1957-present); Montenegro (2011-present)
- Relations: Sawiris family
- Education: Technische Universität Berlin

Samih Onsi Sawiris (Arabic: سميح أنسي ساويرس, Montenegrin: Samih Onsi Saviris / Самих Онси Савирис; born 28 January 1957) is an Egyptian-Montenegrin businessman and investor. He is the former chairman and chief executive officer of Oranscom Development Holding AG. As of July 2026, his net worth was estimated at US$1.4 billion by Forbes.

== Background and education ==
Sawiris was born on January 28, 1957, in Sohag, Egypt, into a Coptic Christian family. He received his Engineering Diploma in Engineering management from Technische Universität Berlin in 1980.

== Career ==
Sawiris founded National Marine Boat Factory, followed by Orascom Projects for Touristic Development in 1996 and Orascom Hotels and Development in 1998; the latter two companies later merged to form Orascom Development Holding AG. He has been chairman and CEO of Orascom Development Holding AG from its incorporation, and stepped down in December 2021. Through his organisation, Sawiris developed holiday resorts in Egypt and Switzerland.

In 2011, he took a 12.5% stake in Swiss football club FC Luzern. In 2017, he invested in Bidroom, a membership-based online hotel booking platform.

In December 2019, he acquired Thomas Cook (Germany) through his Raiffeisen Touristik (RT) Group, which he had bought 74.9% of its shares back in 2014.

In December 2021, Sawiris stepped down as chairman of Orascom Development Holding and transferred his duties to his son, Naguib Samih Sawiris.

== Personal life ==
Sawiris became a Montenegrin citizen in 2011. He is Coptic Christian. Samih is the second of three sons of Onsi Sawiris.
