= Construction industry in Egypt =

The construction industry in Egypt makes up 6.2% of the Egyptian GDP as of 2019. 30% of construction projects in Egypt are done by the public sector. The construction industry in Egypt is regulated by Civil law 131/1948, articles 646-673, Egyptian Contractors Federation Law 104/1992, and Unified Building law 119/2008.

== Background ==
In 2019, construction was 6.2% of Egypt's GDP. According to Columbia University's Global Leaders in Construction Management, Egypt overall has insufficient infrastructure, a high amount of traffic, and a high accident rate. Egypt has a 65,050-kilometer road network and 181 bridges. Egypt has 12 airports and 23 ports. As of 2025, Egypt's planned projects were valued at $565.5 billion and $120 billion worth of projects are currently being constructed.

30% of Egypt's construction projects are done by the public sector. According to the Egyptian Central Agency for Public Mobilisation and Statistics, the inflation rate for construction materials in Egypt reached 500% in the first quarter of 2023.

Civil law 131/1948, articles 646-673 has regulations for construction contracts based on sector. Unified Building law 119/2008 made the construction sector less informal through a permissions and procedures framework. The Egyptian Contractors Federation Law 104/1992 also regulates the construction industry in Egypt.

== History ==
Construction of the Suez Canal began in 1859. Small canals had been previously built to connect the Nile, the Great Bitter Lake, and the Gulf of Suez, but those canals were abandoned after Europeans navigated around Africa. Ferdinand Marie de Lesseps created the Universal Company of the Suez Maritime Canal to dig it. Workers dug 2.6 billion cubic feet at an expense of $100 million.

In 2021, Egypt signed a $4.5 billion contract to build 660-kilometer train line. Egypt's previous train network led to close to 200 accidents in 2024. Tarek Goueili, the head of Egypt's National Authority for Tunnels, claims that the network will carry 15 million tons of cargo per year.
