= Orascom Construction =

Engineering company of Egypt

Orascom Construction PLC
- Formerly: Orascom Onsi Sawiris & Co.
- Type: Public
- Traded as: EGX: ORAS
- Industry: Construction, engineering
- Founded: 1976
- Headquarters: Cairo, Egypt
- Key people: Jérôme Guiraud, Chairman; Osama Bishai, CEO
- Revenue: ▲US$4.17 billion (2022)
- Operating income: ▼US$154.7 million (2022)
- Net income: ▲US$134.3 million (2022)
- Total assets: ▼US$3.53 billion (2022)
- Total equity: ▲US$691.3 million (2022)
- Website: orascom.com

Orascom Construction PLC (OC; Egyptian Arabic: اوراسكوم للإنشاء والصناعه) is an engineering, procurement and construction (EPC) contractor based in Cairo, Egypt. The company was Egypt's first multinational corporation. OC is active in more than 25 countries.

== History ==
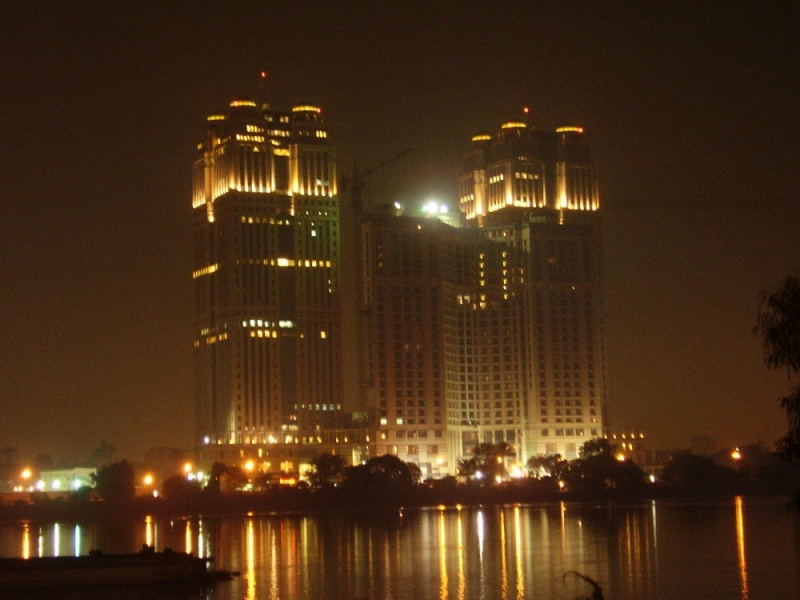
Night view of the Nile City Towers. Orascom Construction headquarters is at the south tower (on the right). In between the two towers lies the Fairmont Hotels and Resorts.

OC was established in Egypt in 1976 and then owned by Onsi Sawiris. As of 2007, it owned and operated cement plants in Egypt, Algeria, Turkey, Pakistan, Iraq, North Korea and Spain, which had a combined annual production capacity of tens of millions of tonnes. OC was the second company formed by Sawiris, having previously opened another construction company in Upper Egypt in 1950 which was nationalized under Gamal Abdel Nasser in 1961.

In December 2007, OC announced the divestment of its cement group, Orascom Building Materials Holding (OBMH), the holding company for its cement group assets, to the French Lafarge.

In July 2011, Orascom Construction won a $450 million bid in Saudi Arabia.

In September 2012, Orascom Construction expanded in the US by building a nitrogen fertilizer plant in Iowa and buying out The Weitz Company. In 2013, Cascade Investment invested $1 billion in Orascom Construction. Following this investment, a Netherlands-based company, OCI NV, was created, and became the parent company of Orascom Construction.

In March 2015, Orascom Construction shares started trading at the Dubai Financial Market and Cairo's Egyptian Exchange.

In July 2018, Orascom Construction partnered with Engie to build the largest wind farm in Egypt. In May 2019, the consortium Bombardier Inc., Orascom Construction and Arab Contractors won the contract to build two monorail lines in Cairo.

Orascom was part of a joint venture with the Belgian company, BESIX Group to build the Grand Egyptian Museum.

== Projects ==
Orascom Construction operates as a major engineering and contracting contractor with a diversified portfolio spanning infrastructure, industrial, and high-end building projects across the Middle East, Africa, and the United States.

Its historical and ongoing project portfolio includes complex civil works, national transportation networks such as metro systems and rail lines, industrial complexes like cement and fertilizer plants, and public infrastructure projects including water treatment facilities and healthcare infrastructure.

Notable projects comprise the Grand Egyptian Museum, the Cairo Monorail, the New Delta wastewater treatment plant, and major renewable energy installations such as the Ras Ghareb and Red Sea wind farms.

The company frequently executes these projects through joint ventures with international engineering firms, operating both as an engineering, procurement, and construction (EPC) contractor and as an equity investor in concessions such as public-private partnerships and renewable energy independent power production.

== Legal issues ==
In 2013, Orascom Group agreed to pay up to $1 billion in tax fines to the Egyptian tax collector following irregularities in the 2007 sale to Lafarge.

== See also ==
- Construction industry in Egypt
- Orascom Telecom Holding
