= George Khayat =

Coptic Egyptian nationalist (1862–1932)

George Khayat (1862–1932) was a Coptic Egyptian nationalist and a prominent member of the Egyptian independence movement during the early 20th century. He is best known for his association with the Wafd Party, led by Saad Zaghloul, and for his role in Egypt's struggle against British colonial rule.

== Early life ==
George Khayat was born in 1862 to a Coptic family in Egypt. He pursued a career in law, which positioned him to engage actively in Egypt's nationalist movement. His legal expertise and commitment to national causes made him a respected figure among his contemporaries.

== Nationalist strife ==
George Khayat was exiled by the British along with Saad Zaghloul and Wissa Wassef to Malta in 1919 as a punishment for his struggle against the British in Egypt. His struggle exemplifies the role of Coptic Christians in Egypt's fight for independence. In April 1922, the British ordered the execution of Khayat along with seven other Egyptian nationalists, four of whom were Copts. However, the execution was downgraded to imprisonment and was never carried out.

== Death ==
George Khayat died in 1932.

== See also ==
- 1919 Egyptian revolution
- Coptic identity
- Coptic nationalism
- Copts
- Egyptian nationalism
- Egyptians
- Liberalism in Egypt
- Pharaonism
