= Islamization of Egypt =

Spread of Islam after the Arab conquests

The Islamization of Egypt occurred after the seventh-century Muslim conquest, in which the Islamic Rashidun Caliphate seized control of Egypt from the Christian dominated Byzantine Empire. Egypt and other conquered territories in Africa gradually underwent a large-scale conversion from Christianity to Islam, motivated in part by a jizya tax for those who refused to convert. Islam became the faith of the majority of the population at some point between the 13th and 14th centuries, and Arabic became the main language, replacing Coptic and Greek, which had previously served as the vernacular and governmental languages, respectively.

== History ==
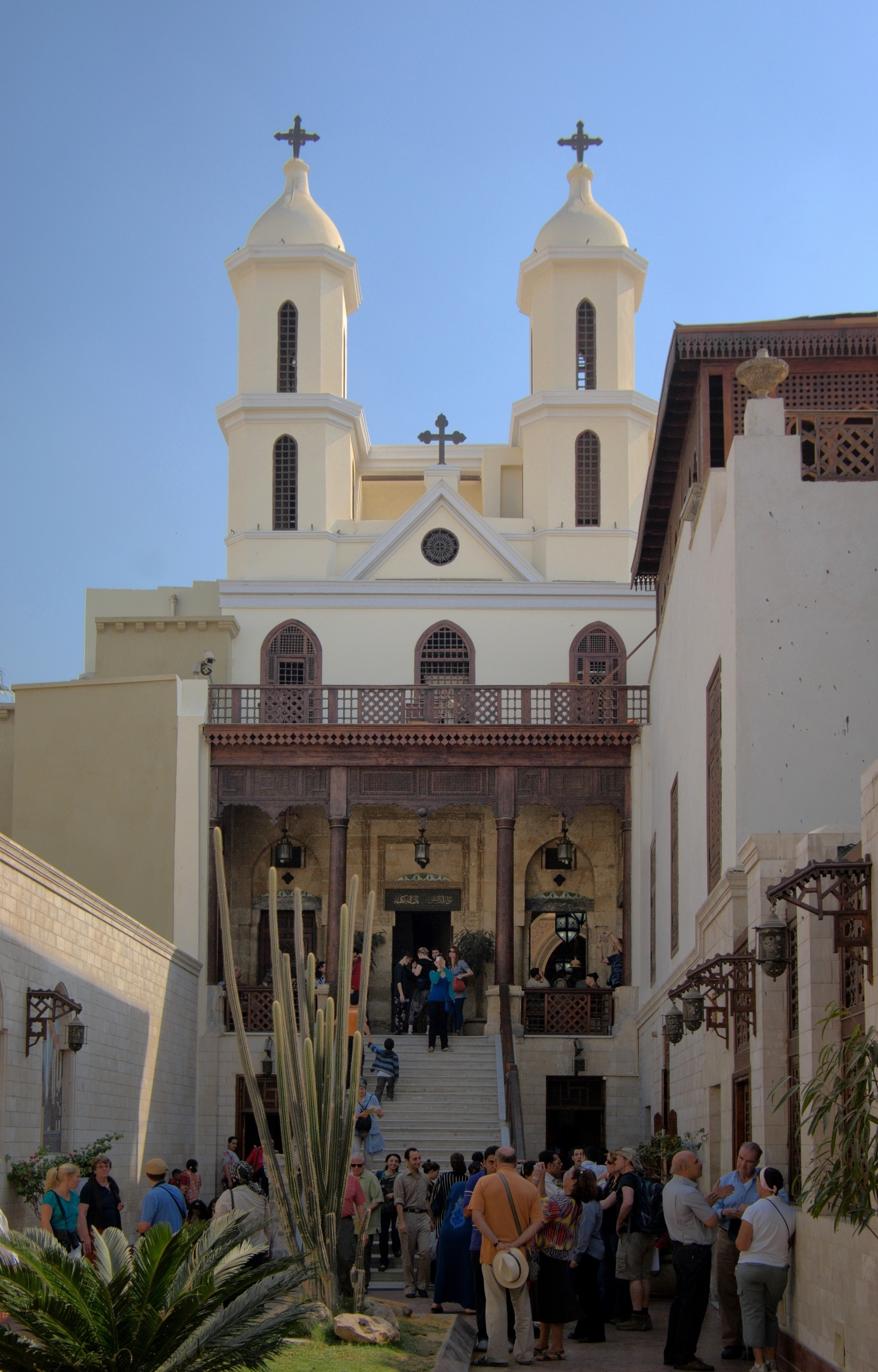
The Hanging Church in Old Cairo was founded in the third century, making it one of the oldest churches in Egypt.

In the mid 7th century, the Rashidun Caliphate successfully conquered Egypt from the Byzantine Empire. This ended seven centuries of mostly uninterrupted Roman rule over Egypt. (Note: The Sasanian Empire, which generally followed Zoroastrianism, held Egypt for around a decade in the early 7th century.) However, local resistance by the Egyptians occurred during the Abbasid revolution by both Muslims and Christians.

One contributing factor to this resistance was taxation. Under the Rashidun Caliphate and its successors, non-Muslims were required to pay a special tax called jizya and were given status as dhimmis. The taxation was argued as being justified as local Christians were never drafted to serve in the army.

This resistance escalated to armed rebellions against the Umayyads and Abbasids in a number of instances, such as during the Bashmurian revolts in the Nile Delta.

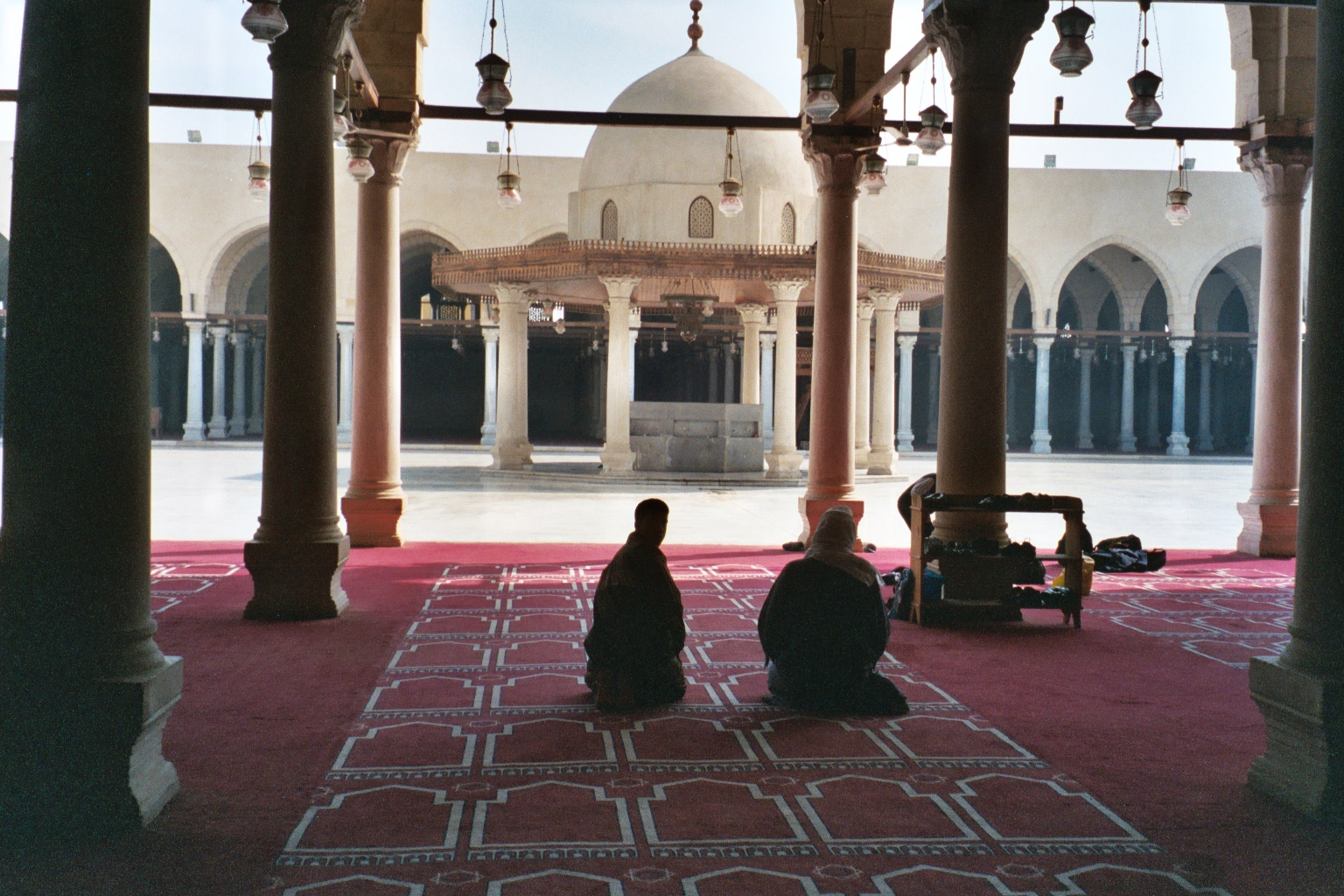
The Amr ibn al-As Mosque was the first mosque built in both Egypt and Africa. It was built in Fustat (now Old Cairo), the newly founded capital of Rashidun Egypt.

Religious life remained largely undisturbed following the establishment of Arab rule, as evidence by the rich output of Coptic Orthodox Christian arts in monastic centers in Old Cairo (Fustat) and throughout Egypt. Conditions, however, worsened shortly after that, and in the eighth and ninth centuries when Muslim rulers banned the use of human forms in art (taking advantage of an iconoclastic conflict in the European-ruled Byzantium) and consequently destroyed many Coptic Christian paintings mainly of Jesus and frescoes in churches.

Under the Fatimid Caliphate, Egypt experienced a period of relative tolerance. The Fatimid rulers employed Copts in the government and participated in Coptic and local Egyptian feasts. Major renovation and reconstruction of churches and monasteries were also undertaken. Coptic arts flourished, reaching new heights in Middle and Upper Egypt. Despite this, by this time, Coptic Christians had lost their majority status, as a result of the intermittent persecution and the destruction of the Christian churches and forced conversions to Islam.

However, the subsequent Mamluk Sultanate returned to previous practices of levying jizya and forcing conversions. The Coptic decline in Egypt occurred under the Bahri sultans and accelerated further under the Burji regime. There were several instances of Egyptian Muslim protests against the wealth of Copts and their employment with the state, and both Muslim and Christian rioters burned down each other's houses of worship during intercommunal clashes.

As a result of popular pressure, Copts had their employment in the bureaucracy terminated at least nine times between the late 13th and mid-15th centuries, and on one occasion.

Coptic bureaucrats were often restored to their positions after tensions passed. Many Copts were forced to convert to Islam or at least adopted outward expressions of Muslim faith to protect their employment and avoid the jizya and official measures against them. A large wave of Coptic conversions to Islam occurred in the 14th century, as a result of persecution, destruction of churches, and to retain employment. By the end of the Mamluk period, the ratio of Muslims to Christians in Egypt may have risen to 10:1.

According to the medieval Egyptian historian Al-Maqrizi, soon afterwards in "all the provinces of Egypt, both north and south, no church remained that had not been razed.... Thus did Islam spread among the Christians of Egypt."

== See also ==
- Spread of Islam
- Coptic identity
- Forced conversion
- Persecution of Copts
- Early Muslim conquests
- Pharaonist movement

== Sources ==
- Betts, Robert B. (1978). Christians in the Arab East: A Political Study (2nd rev. ed.). Athens: Lycabettus Press. ISBN 978-0-8042-0796-6.
- Etheredge, Laura S., ed. (2011). Middle East, Region in Transition: Egypt. Britannica Educational Publishing. ISBN 9781615303922.
- Feder, Frank (2017). "The Bashmurite Revolts in the Delta and the 'Bashmuric Dialect'". In Gawdat Gabra; Hany N. Takla (eds.). Christianity and Monasticism in Northern Egypt: Beni Suef, Giza, Cairo, and the Nile Delta. American University in Cairo Press. pp. 33–36.
- Charles, Robert H. (2007) [1916]. The Chronicle of John, Bishop of Nikiu: Translated from Zotenberg's Ethiopic Text. Merchantville, NJ: Evolution Publishing. ISBN 978-1-889758-87-9.
- Teule, Herman G. B. (2013). "Introduction: Constantinople and Granada, Christian-Muslim Interaction 1350–1516". In Thomas, David; Mallett, Alex (eds.). Christian-Muslim Relations. A Bibliographical History, Volume 5 (1350–1500). Brill. ISBN 978-90-04-25278-3.
- Kamil, Jill (1990). Coptic Egypt: History and a Guide (Revised ed.). American University in Cairo Press.
- Meyendorff, John (1989). Imperial unity and Christian divisions: The Church 450-680 A.D. The Church in history. Vol. 2. Crestwood, NY: St. Vladimir's Seminary Press. ISBN 978-0-88141-056-3.
- Stilt, Kristen (2011). Islamic Law in Action: Authority, Discretion, and Everyday Experiences in Mamluk Egypt. Oxford University Press. ISBN 978-0-19-960243-8.
- Ostrogorsky, George (1956). History of the Byzantine State. Oxford: Basil Blackwell.
