= Coptic identity =

Ethnic identification of the traditional Christian community of Egypt

Coptic identity is rooted in the long history of the Copts as a significant Christian minority in Egypt, where Muslims form the majority. Copts lost their majority status after the 14th century, following the spread of Islam across Egypt and the rest of North Africa. They are, like the broader Egyptian population, (Note: See) descended from the ancient Egyptians. (Note: See) Copts predominantly follow the Coptic Orthodox Church in Alexandria.

Following the Arab conquest of Egypt in the 7th century, the term "Copt" became associated with Egypt's native population, who were majority Christian at the time. Over time, the term "Copt" came to represent Egyptian Christians as distinct from Egyptians who had embraced Islam. While cultural and historical connections to ancient Egypt constitute a significant part of Coptic identity, modern Copts are part of the broader Egyptian population, shaped by various cultural influences and their Christian faith. Genetics have shown that both Egypt's Muslim and Christian populations are largely descended from the pre-Islamic Egyptian population.

The Coptic Christian population in Egypt is the largest Christian community in the Middle East. Christians represent around 5% to 15% of a population of over 115 million Egyptians, though estimates vary (see Religion in Egypt). Around 95% of them belong to the native Coptic Orthodox Church of Alexandria. The remaining (around 800,000) are divided between the Coptic Catholic Church and Coptic Protestant churches.

The question of Coptic identity was never raised before the rise of pan-Arabism under Nasser in the early 1950s. Up to that point, both Egyptian Muslims and Egyptian Christians viewed themselves as only Egyptians without any Arab sentiment. The struggle to maintain this Egyptian identity began as Nasser and his regime tried to impose an Arab identity on the country, and attempted to erase all references to Egypt as a separate and unique entity. Many Copts view Arab identity as closely associated with Islam and may not fully identify with it, but they also have a national identity shared with other Egyptians. Copts and Muslim Egyptians are recognized as being physically indistinguishable.

== Copts as Egyptians ==
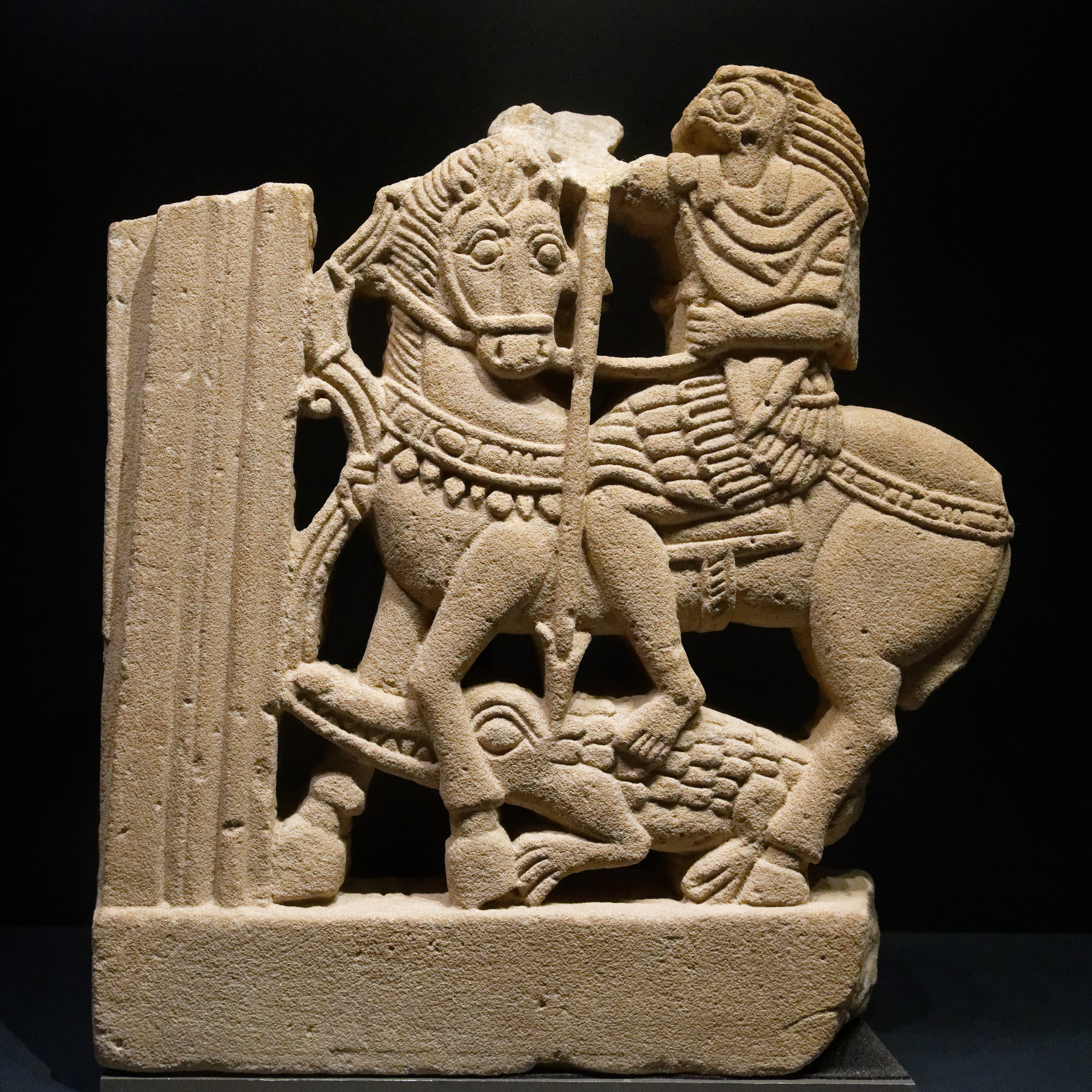
4th-century relief of the Egyptian god Horus as a cavalryman killing the crocodile, Setekh; a precursor to the Copts' depiction of Saint George killing the Dragon

In Greco-Roman Egypt, the term Copt designated the local population of Egypt, as opposed to the elite group of foreign rulers and settlers (Greeks, Romans, etc.) who came to Egypt from other regions and established prominent empires. The word Copt was then adopted in English in the 17th century, from Neo-Latin Coptus, Cophtus, which is derived from Arabic collective qubṭ, qibṭ قبط "the Copts" with nisba adjective qubṭī, qibṭī قبطي, plural aqbāṭ أقباط; Also quftī, qiftī, Arabic /f/ representing historical Coptic /p/. an Arabisation of the Coptic word kubti (Bohairic) and/or kuptaion (Sahidic). The Coptic word is in turn an adaptation of the Greek Αἰγύπτιος "Egyptian".

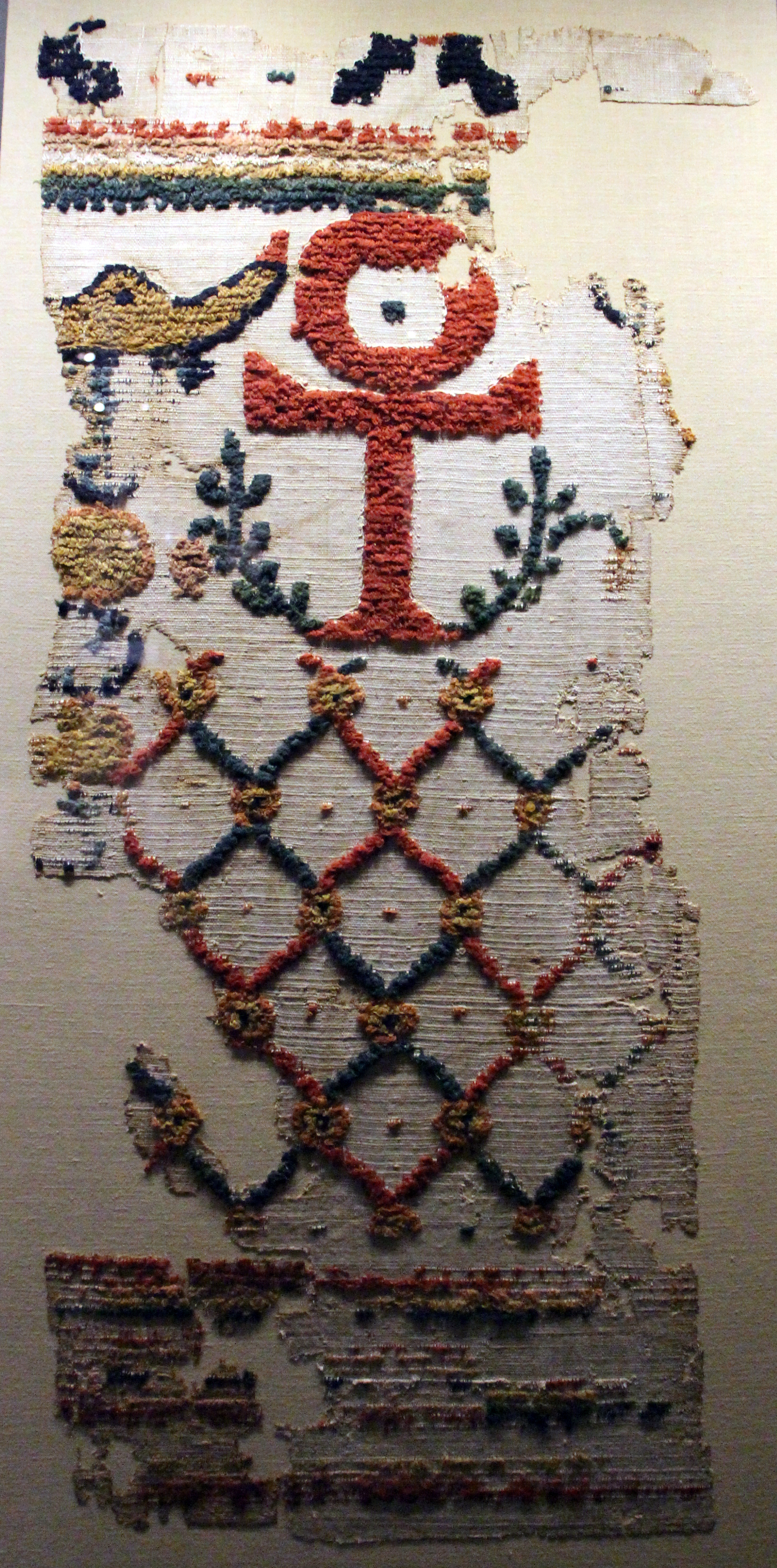
4th century Coptic wool-and-linen textile featuring the ancient Egyptian symbol Ankh

After the Arab conquest of Egypt, the term Copt became restricted to those Egyptians who remained adhering to the Christian religion.

In their historic Coptic language, which represents the final stage of the Egyptian language, there is no distinct term equivalent to Copt, as a designation separate from Egyptian. Instead, terms such as rem en kēme (in the Sahidic dialect) ⲣⲙⲛⲕⲏⲙⲉ, lem en kēmi (Fayyumic), and rem en khēmi (Bohairic) ⲣⲉⲙ̀ⲛⲭⲏⲙⲓ are attested, all of which literally mean "people of Egypt" or "Egyptians"; cf. Egyptian rmṯ n kmt, Demotic rmt n kmỉ. These expressions are not specific to Christians and treat the word Copt as synonymous with Egyptian. In this context, the phrase NiRemenkēmi enKhristianos (ⲚⲓⲢⲉⲙ̀ⲛⲭⲏⲙⲓ ̀ⲛ̀Ⲭⲣⲏⲥⲧⲓ̀ⲁⲛⲟⲥ, the Christian people of Egypt, in the Sahidic dialect) may be considered the closest formulation for distinguishing Copts from the broader Egyptian population.

Copts have historically maintained a strong sense of Egyptian identity, which has played a role in their cultural and religious expression. Throughout history, Copts have expressed resistance to broader regional identities such as pan-Arabism and Islamism, while emphasizing their connection to Egypt. While an integral part of broader Egyptian society and culture, Copts also preserve distinct religious traditions and some unique cultural elements. Coptic music is thought to incorporate some influences from earlier Egyptian musical traditions. Copts also maintain the use of the Coptic calendar, which is based on the ancient Egyptian calendar and remains significant in their liturgical practices.

== History ==
=== Ptolemaic and Roman Egypt ===
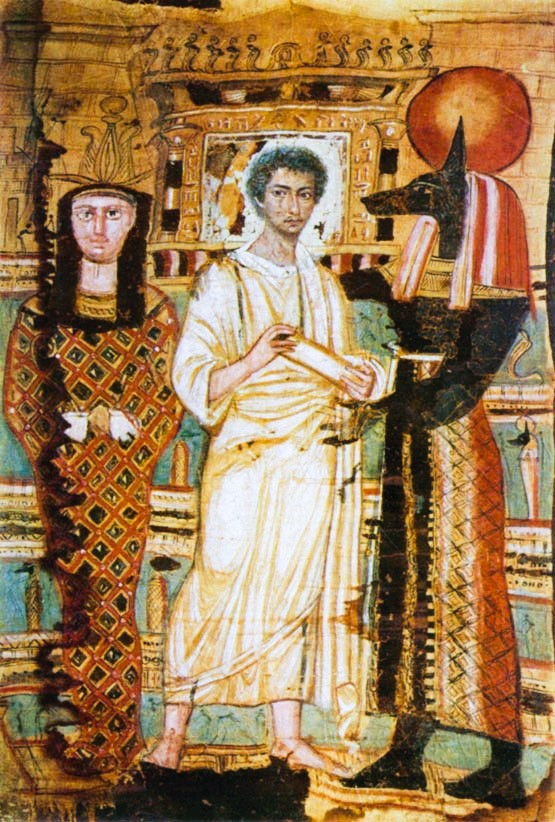
An Egyptian man with Anubis

Egypt has historically been one of the most populous lands of the ancient Mediterranean world, with a population of at least three million Egyptians in the first century BC, according to the Greek historian Diodorus Siculus. This large population enabled Egypt to absorb and Egyptianize settlers who arrived during and after the Third Intermediate Period. The enduring strength and distinctiveness of Egyptian culture meant that immigrants rapidly integrated into Egyptian society and were often distinguishable only by their names, if at all.

The Ptolemaic rulers, who governed Egypt after the death of Alexander the Great, were of Greek origin. They respected Egyptian traditions and religion, commissioning numerous temples for native gods, including the Temple of Horus at Edfu and the Temple of Hathor at Dendera. The Ptolemies also drained the marshes of the Faiyum to create new agricultural land, where some Greeks as well as war captives from Syria and Palestine were settled.

The exact number of non-native Egyptians during the Hellenistic period is uncertain, as no complete population census survives. Some scholars have estimated immigrants, including Greeks and non-Greeks, to represent roughly 10% of the population, though this figure has been challenged as likely excessive. The Faiyum mummy portraits illustrate the synthesis of Egyptian cultural and religious practices with Hellenistic artistic influences, as they were often attached to traditional Egyptian-style sarcophagi. A dental analysis of Roman-period Faiyum mummies showed strong affinities with earlier Egyptian populations, suggesting substantial biological continuity.

Despite the presence of immigrants and a Greek ruling dynasty, Egypt remained predominantly Egyptian in both population and culture. Most rural and urban Egyptians continued their traditional way of life during the Ptolemaic period. Even in Alexandria, the Ptolemaic capital and the largest Greek city outside Greece, native Egyptians outnumbered Greeks. Over time, the immigrant communities gradually assimilated into the Egyptian population, so that when Rome annexed Egypt in 30 BC, most Greeks were categorized by Roman authorities as "Egyptians".

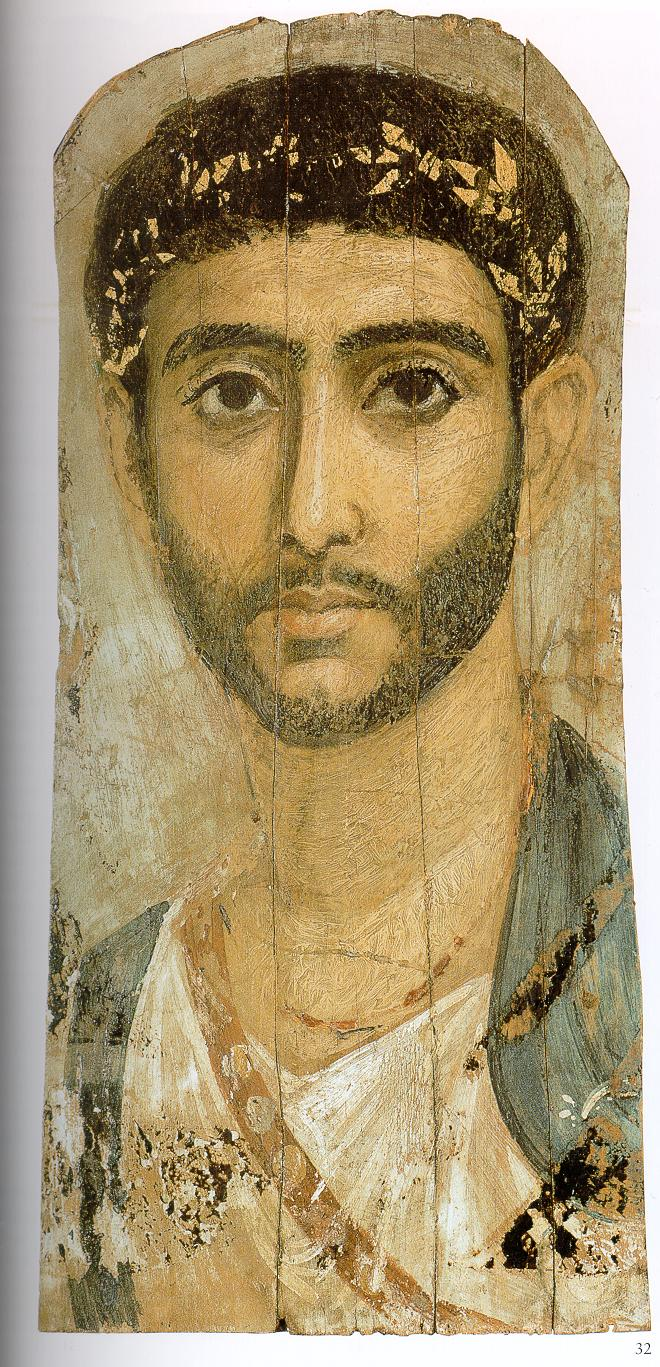
Faiyum mummy portrait of an Egyptian man with sword belt, Altes Museum

The Egyptian population continued to use their native language. Egyptian hieroglyphs were employed primarily in formal religious contexts, while Demotic Egyptian was widely used for everyday legal, administrative, and literary purposes. Greek became the primary administrative and legal language. Egyptian Greek, the form of Greek spoken in Egypt, incorporated many loanwords from Egyptian and reflected extensive bilingualism.

During the Roman period, the use of Demotic gradually declined, replaced by the final stage of the Egyptian language, known as Coptic. Coptic was written primarily using the Greek alphabet with additional Demotic signs to represent uniquely Egyptian sounds. Importantly, "Coptic" originally referred to the script, not the language itself, as Egyptians continued to regard their language simply as "Egyptian". The Romans officially classified the rural Egyptian population uniformly as "Egyptians".

By the reign of Caracalla in the second century AD, the primary distinguishing feature of ethnic Egyptians was reportedly their speech.

The development of the Coptic script further reinforced the distinct identity of native Egyptians vis-à-vis the ruling Byzantine Greeks. The earliest Coptic manuscripts, dating from the third century AD, became more widespread by the fourth century. Early Coptic texts included Christian writings as well as Manichaean and Gnostic literature.

Shenoute of Atripe, a prolific fourth- and fifth-century Coptic writer and monastic leader, contributed significantly to the development of Coptic literature. Under his influence and that of his successors, Coptic flourished as a literary language, though it never fully displaced Greek as the dominant language of official state functions.

=== Emergence of Coptic identity ===
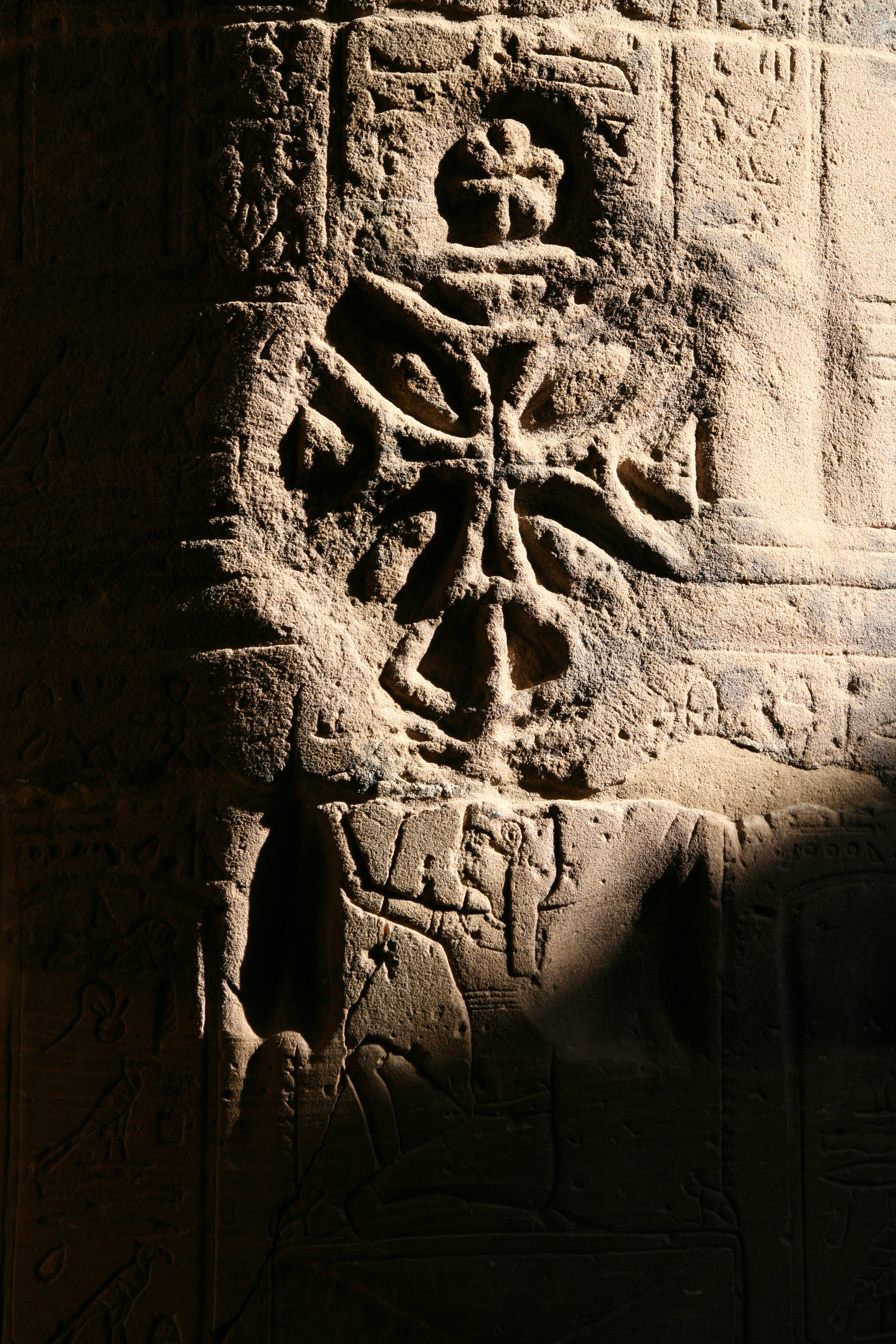
Coptic Cross on a column in the Temple of Philae

In the fourth and fifth centuries AD, doctrinal differences between the native Christian Church of Egypt and the wider empire began to emerge. The exile of Athanasius of Alexandria by emperor Constantine the Great in the fourth century symbolized the growing distinctiveness of the Church in Egypt. Athanasius’s persecution helped establish a model for later Patriarchs of Alexandria, who were frequently portrayed as defenders of religious orthodoxy against external pressures.

The official schism occurred at the Council of Chalcedon in 451 AD. The council condemned and deposed the native Egyptian Patriarch Dioscorus I, a decision rejected by the Egyptian delegation and the broader Egyptian population. As a result, the Church of Alexandria split into two branches: one that accepted the council’s decrees, later known as the Greek Orthodox Patriarchate of Alexandria, and one that rejected them, eventually forming the Coptic Orthodox Church. The latter tradition, to which the majority of native Egyptians adhered, identifies as Miaphysite rather than Monophysite. The Miaphysite doctrine became a central element of Egyptian religious identity.

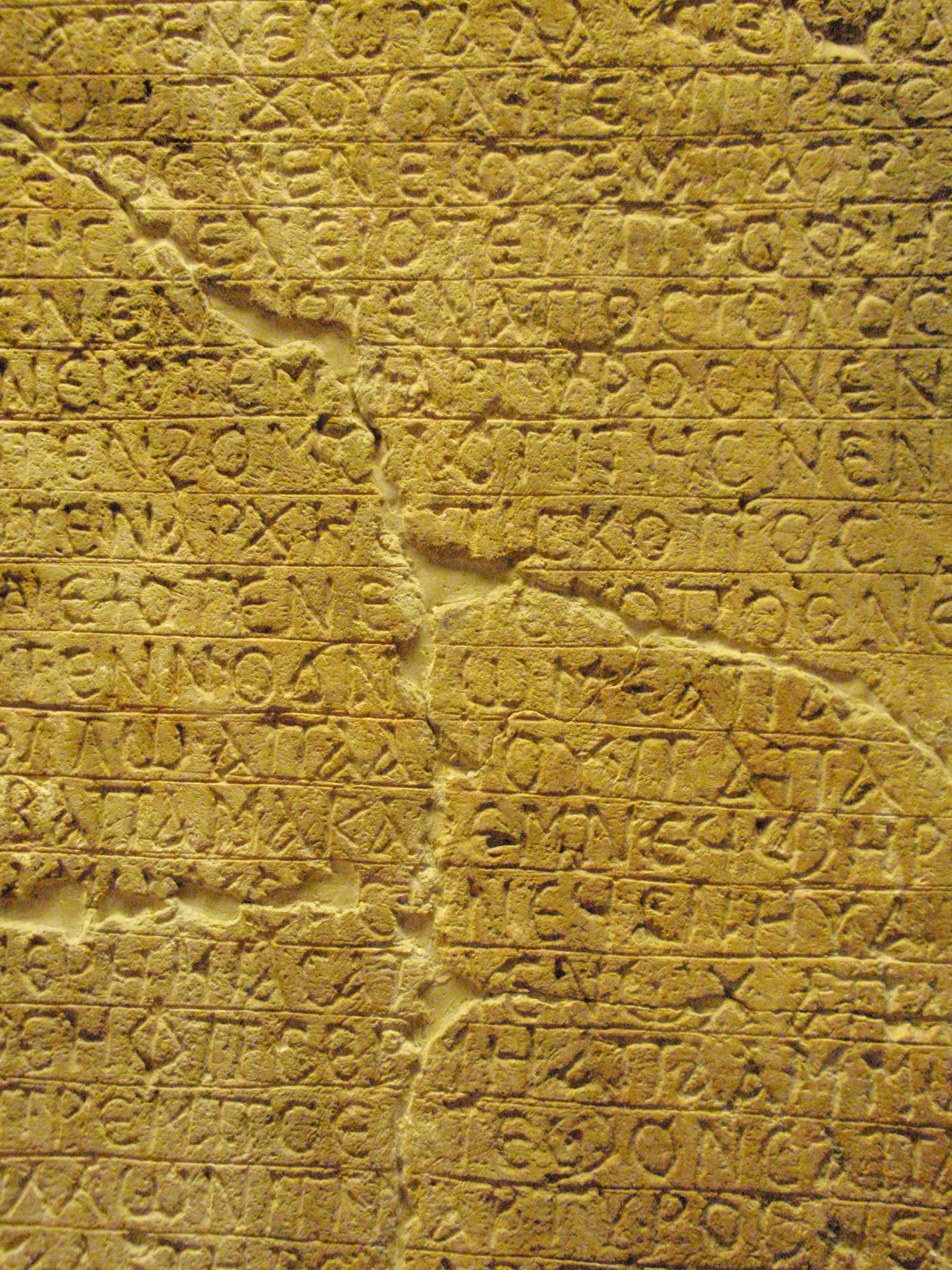
Coptic liturgical inscription from Upper Egypt, dated to the fifth or sixth century

A distinct Egyptian Christian identity became more clearly visible following the reign of Emperor Justinian I in the sixth century. During this period, the Coptic Orthodox Church increasingly distanced itself from the Chalcedonian Orthodoxy associated with the imperial government. Native Egyptian narratives retrospectively interpreted the early history of the Church as a continuous development leading to the emergence of the Coptic Church. Throughout the sixth and seventh centuries, Byzantine emperors often deposed native non-Chalcedonian patriarchs and installed Chalcedonian ones, who were frequently perceived by Egyptians as imperial appointees rather than legitimate spiritual leaders.

Over time, opposition to Chalcedonian theology hardened in Egypt. From 575 AD onward, bishops appointed by Damian of Alexandria increasingly used the Coptic language for theological writings, sermons, and homilies, replacing Greek. During this period, the History of the Patriarchs of Alexandria began to take form, initially composed in Coptic. The use of Coptic expanded beyond religious contexts to include private and official secular documents.

Sound Christological theology became a cornerstone of Coptic religious identity in the post-Chalcedonian era and under early Muslim rule. Coptic Christians emphasized continuity with prominent Alexandrian theologians such as Athanasius of Alexandria and Cyril of Alexandria, whose teachings formed the basis of orthodox Christian belief. Athanasius’s resistance to imperial pressure during the Arian controversy, and the later rejection of Chalcedonian doctrines, reinforced among Copts the principle that theological integrity outweighed imperial authority.

The theology of the Alexandrian patriarchs, particularly Cyril’s Christological formulations, remained the standard against which Coptic doctrine was measured. The Coptic Orthodox Church continues to view itself as the legitimate guardian of these theological traditions.

Another important aspect of Coptic identity was the emphasis on ethnic and religious continuity with the Egyptian martyrs of earlier centuries. Numerous hagiographical texts celebrated Egyptian Christian martyrs, highlighting their native origin and often portraying their Roman persecutors as outsiders.

This emphasis on martyrdom contributed to the adoption of a distinct calendar system: the Coptic calendar was redated to begin in 284 AD, the year of Diocletian’s accession, marking the beginning of widespread Christian persecution in Egypt. Since then, the Coptic calendar has been identified with the abbreviation A.M. (Anno Martyrum, or "Year of the Martyrs").

Egypt’s martyrs, together with the proliferation of shrines across the country, reinforced the narrative of a sacred Egyptian Christian heritage. The Flight into Egypt by the Holy Family was also incorporated into this tradition, contributing to Egypt’s religious significance in Coptic thought. According to the Coptic Synaxarium, an Egyptian youth named Eudaimon recognized Jesus as the Messiah during the Holy Family’s stay and was martyred, further linking Coptic identity to the early Christian era.

=== Arab Muslim invasion of Egypt ===
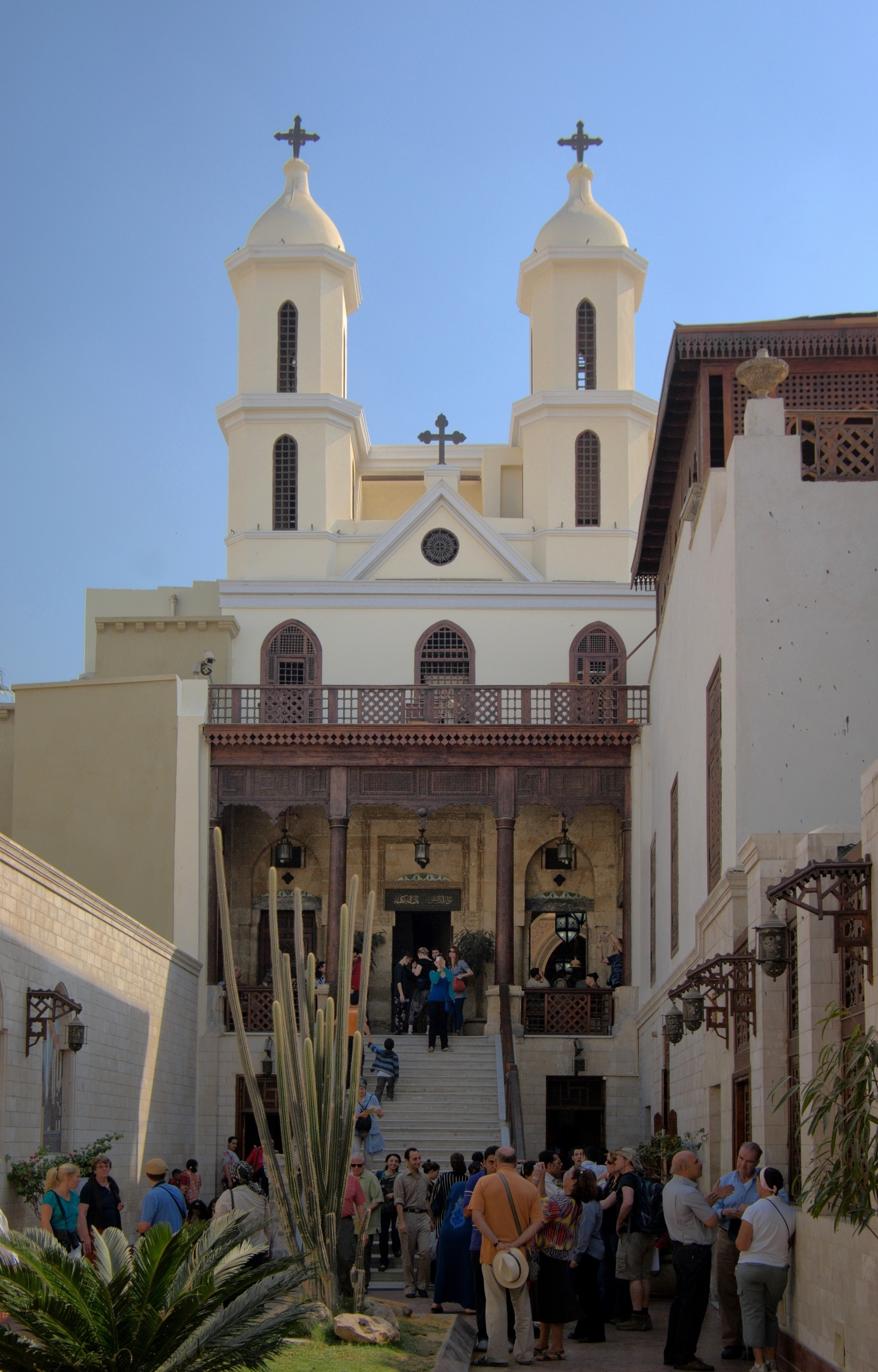
The Hanging Church, one of Cairo's most famous Coptic churches

The rule of the Byzantine Empire in Egypt was briefly interrupted from 618 to 629 AD by the Persian occupation of Egypt. The Persians reportedly persecuted Egyptians and committed massacres, notably in Alexandria and Enaton. This period saw the disappearance of Egypt’s highest elites, a loss of leadership and resources, and a weakening of the country, which left it unable to resist the Arab Muslim army that invaded in 641 AD.

The Arab forces that entered Egypt numbered only a few thousand and included units from various Arab tribes, particularly from Yemen. Along the way through northern Sinai and the Mediterranean coast, additional groups such as Bedouins from Sinai and the Eastern Desert, Nabataeans, and local bandits joined the campaign. Estimates of the total force range between twelve and fifteen thousand men.

Some contemporary Coptic sources, such as the bishop John of Nikiû, interpreted the Arab conquest of Egypt as divine punishment directed against the Byzantine Empire for its adherence to Chalcedonian Christianity, which was rejected by much of the Egyptian population. Byzantine officials in Middle Egypt were, according to some accounts, accused by Egyptians of providing assistance to the Muslim forces. Later in 641 AD, a treaty concluded between the Byzantine Prefect of Egypt Cyrus of Alexandria and the Arab general Amr ibn al-As resulted in the surrender of Alexandria.

Following the conquest, Arab forces reportedly destroyed parts of Alexandria’s fortifications and several churches. In the early years of the Rashidun Caliphate, Egypt’s resources, labor, and produce were extensively utilized through heavy taxation. The Arab administration's immediate priority was resource extraction. One of their first measures was conducting a population census, followed by labor and tax organization to maximize revenues.

By the early eighth century, Copts were increasingly conscripted for forced labor on projects such as shipbuilding and the construction of state infrastructure in Fustat, Damascus, and Jerusalem. Each village was obligated to provide a quota of laborers annually, a burden that particularly strained rural communities. Naval service was especially feared due to the low chances of returning home.

In response to forced labor, discrimination, and taxation, especially the Jizya levied on non-Muslims under Islamic law, many Egyptians gradually converted to Islam. The Jizya was typically payable in gold, helping finance military campaigns across the Mediterranean. Egyptians who converted became known as Mawali, and over time were simply absorbed into the broader Muslim community.

The term "Copt" consequently came to denote specifically Egyptians who remained Christian. Many of these attempted to avoid conscription by paying monetary substitutions. Nevertheless, many rural Copts were left impoverished by taxation. These hardships triggered numerous revolts, including the notable Bashmurian revolts between 720 and 832 AD. Others fled their villages or fell into debt to meet tax obligations.

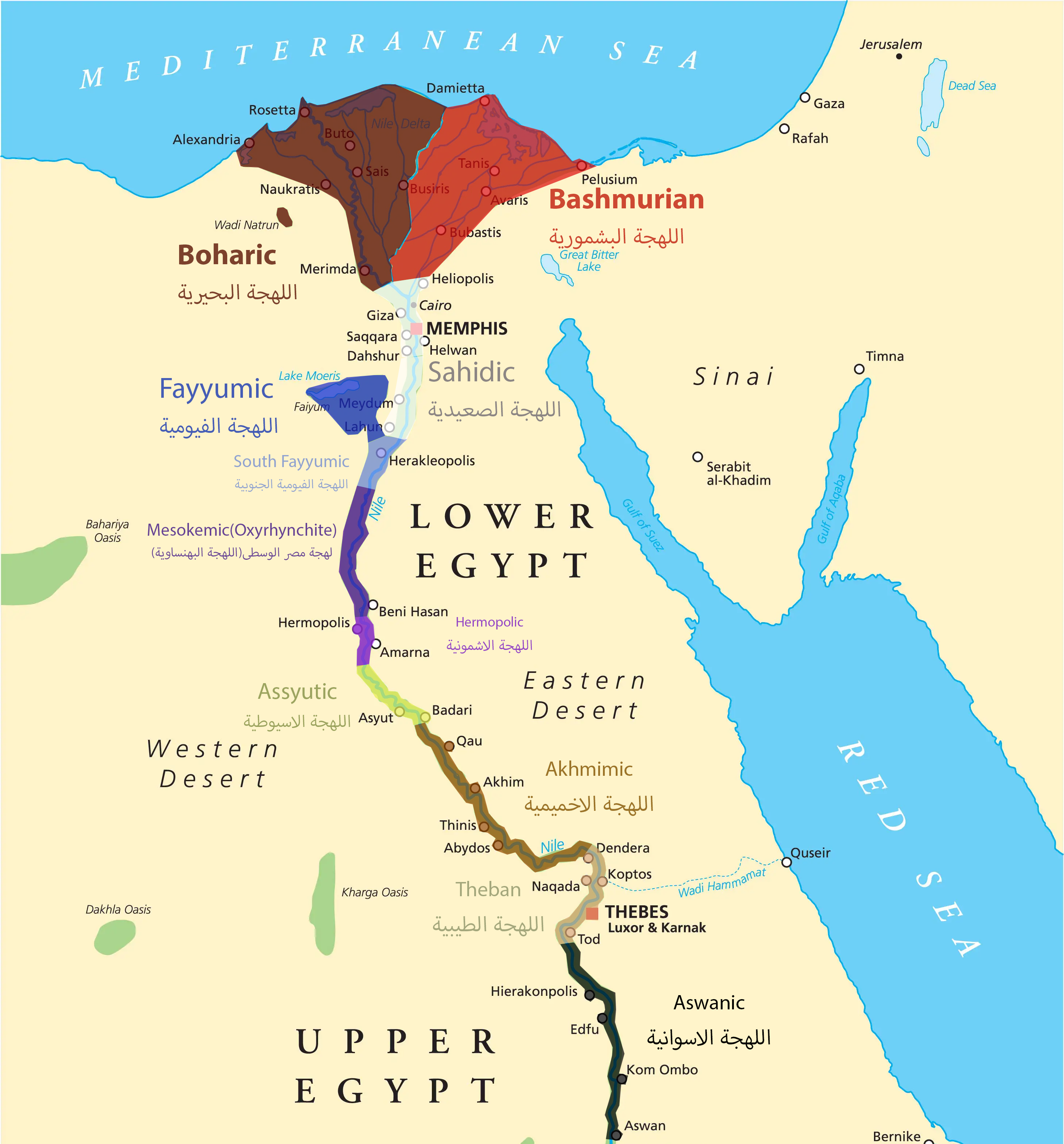
Historical map of the distribution of Coptic dialects

To manage growing numbers of fugitives, the administration imposed fines for harboring them and rewards for their capture. These developments fostered solidarity networks within villages that further strengthened Coptic communal identity.

Under Islamic rule, the Coptic Orthodox Church consolidated its position by emphasizing its native Egyptian character, distinguishing itself from Christian groups aligned with foreign powers. By the late seventh century, the non-Chalcedonian Coptic Church had the broadest network of bishops and monasteries, particularly in the countryside.

A rival Chalcedonian patriarch, appointed by the Byzantine emperor, remained in Alexandria, but was widely viewed by Egyptians as a foreign imposition. In contrast, the Coptic Orthodox Church presented itself as the legitimate successor to the Christian community founded by Saint Mark.

The development of a distinct Egyptian Christian identity during the early Islamic period is reflected in religious and historical texts, such as those attributed to Pope Benjamin I of Alexandria.

To adapt to shifting political realities, the patriarchate eventually relocated from Alexandria to the Hanging Church in Cairo under Pope Cyril II of Alexandria in the late eleventh century.

Over time, Coptic identity emphasized both theological distinctiveness and Egyptian ethnic heritage, particularly as Arab Muslim communities expanded in the countryside. The increasing use of Arabic provided a linguistic and cultural point of distinction. The semantic shift of "Copt" to refer specifically to Christian Egyptians took place by the eighth or ninth centuries.

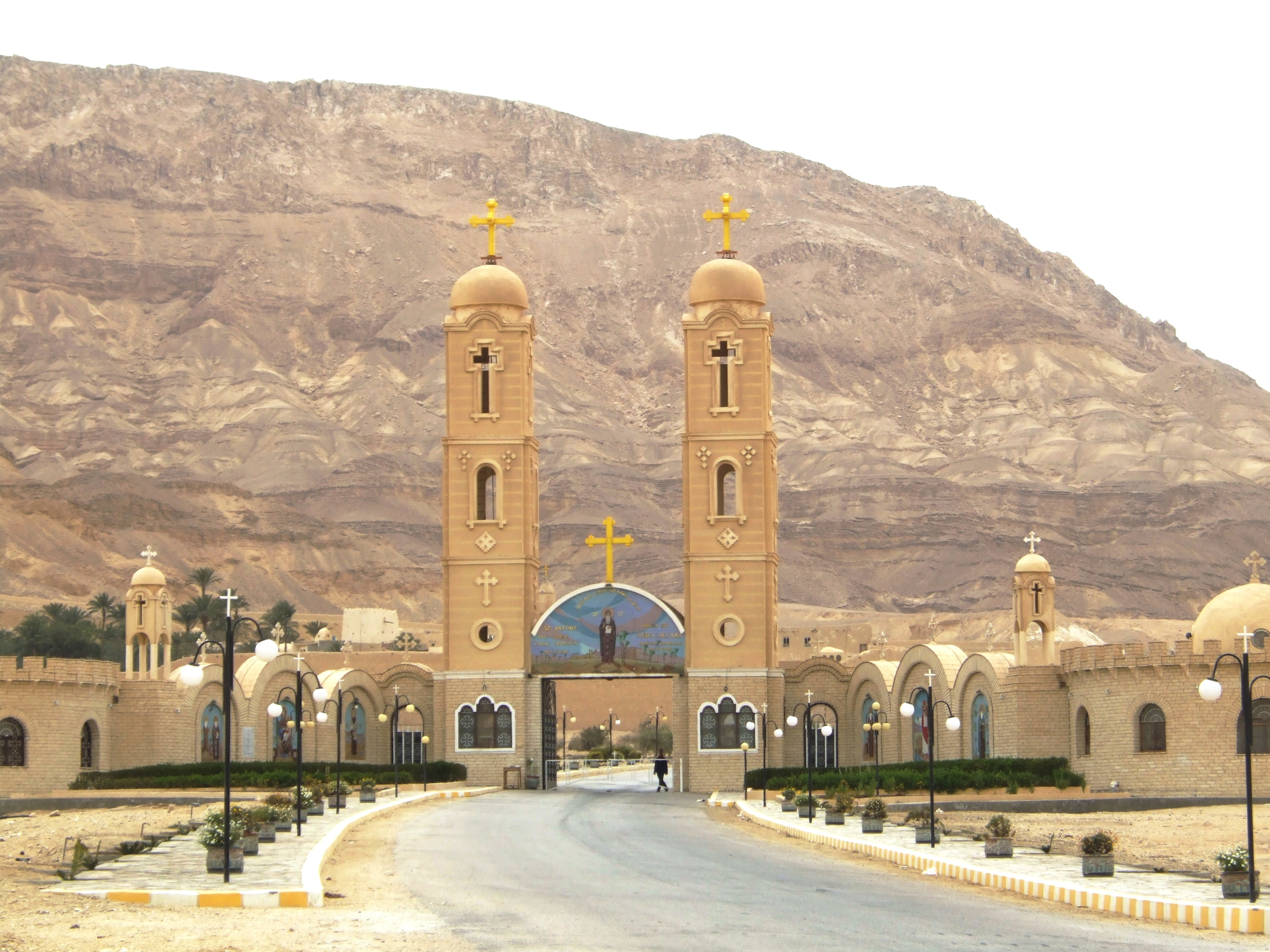
Monastery of Saint Anthony in the Eastern Desert

Conversions to Islam often offered significant economic relief from taxes such as the Jizya. Fiscal pressures are emphasized in historical sources such as the History of the Patriarchs of Alexandria. Converts often adopted Arabic names while retaining fluency in Coptic. Despite this, Egypt remained majority Christian into the 10th century, with sources like al-Maqdisi noting that many areas of Upper Egypt had few or no Muslim communities.

Coptic monasticism played a vital role in preserving Coptic religious and cultural identity. Egyptian monasteries produced new literature and preserved older works, contributing to the maintenance of a distinct communal memory. Anti-Chalcedonian polemics persisted in monastic literature, with works such as the Life of Samuel of Qalamun.

By the end of the Fatimid Caliphate, Arabic had become the dominant language in Egypt, although Coptic remained in use among rural communities and as the liturgical language of the Church. The Coptic Orthodox Church formally adopted Arabic for public readings during the papacy of Pope Gabriel II of Alexandria in the twelfth century.

A major translation movement of religious texts into Arabic occurred between the mid-eleventh and thirteenth centuries. Some resistance to Arabicization is evident in Coptic literature, notably in the Apocalypse of Samuel of Kalamoun. Despite opposition, Arabic gradually became the administrative and ecclesiastical language.

It remains debated whether the Church’s language policy was reactive or proactive in response to the broader societal shift.

=== Middle Ages ===
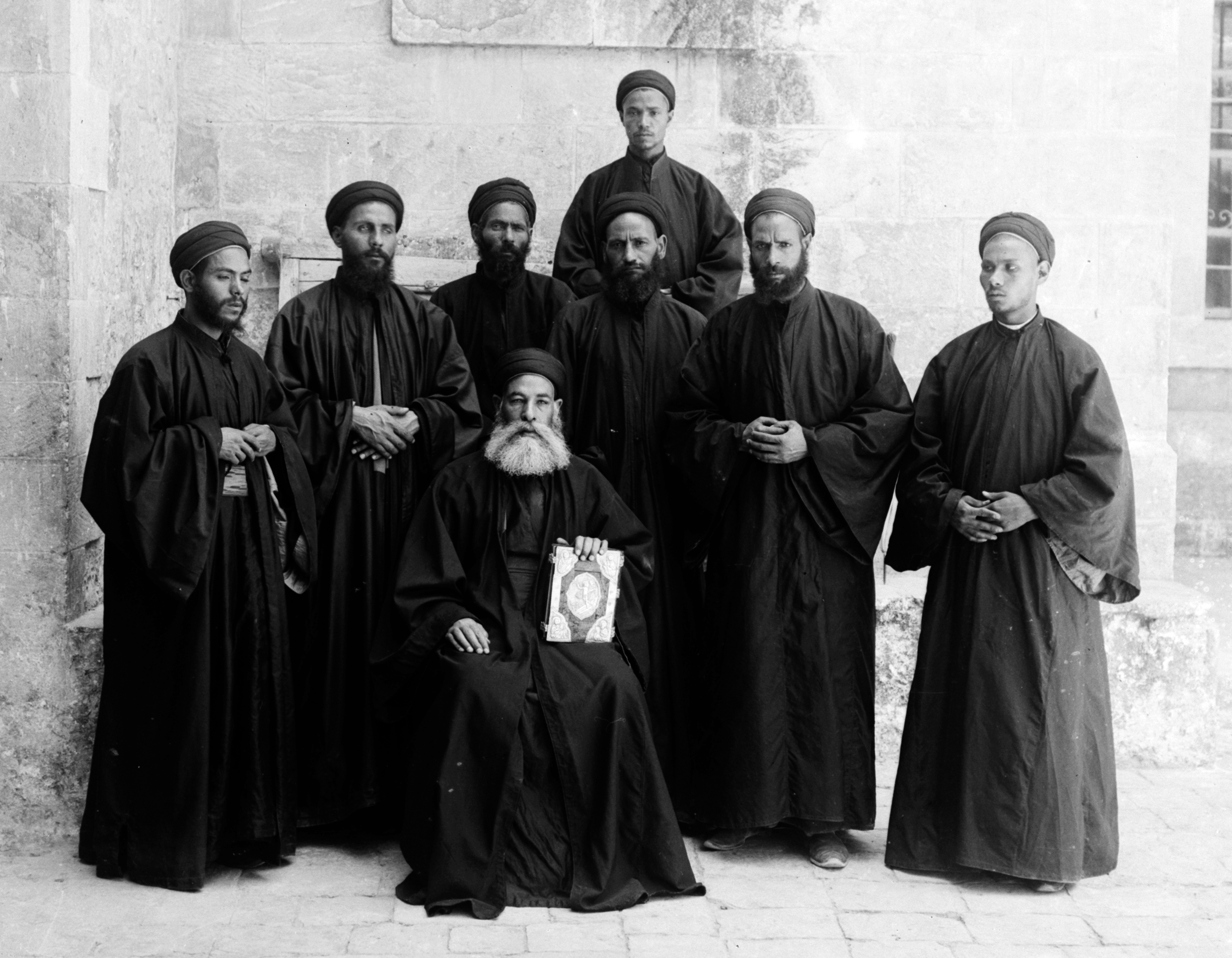
Egyptian Coptic monks in Jerusalem

After internal conflicts between Muslims, the Umayyads ultimately defeated their rivals and emerged triumphant. They established their caliphate in Damascus in 661, and Egypt became part of the Umayyad Caliphate. The Umayyads imposed restrictions on the Copts and their church. During the reign of Yazid I, instances of violence and looting against the Copts were recorded. Abd al-Aziz ibn Marwan imprisoned and pressured the Coptic Pope John III until he paid him one hundred pieces of gold. Abd al-Aziz also sought to diminish the status of the Copts by ordering the destruction of all crosses in Egypt, and by posting messages reading "Mohammed is the great prophet of Allah, and Issa also is a prophet, and Allah neither begets nor is born" on the doors of churches.

Studies of the overall distributions of religious groups over the long term show that, from the Middle Ages to the 20th century, conversions of Copts from Christianity to Islam occurred mainly among the least prosperous. Copts of higher status hardly needed conversion for their advancement. By remaining within their own community, they kept control over it, which gave them more negotiating power with the rulers. It was for the weaker portion of the Christian population of Egypt that conversion to Islam represented a real progression, not only financially but also in terms of independence.

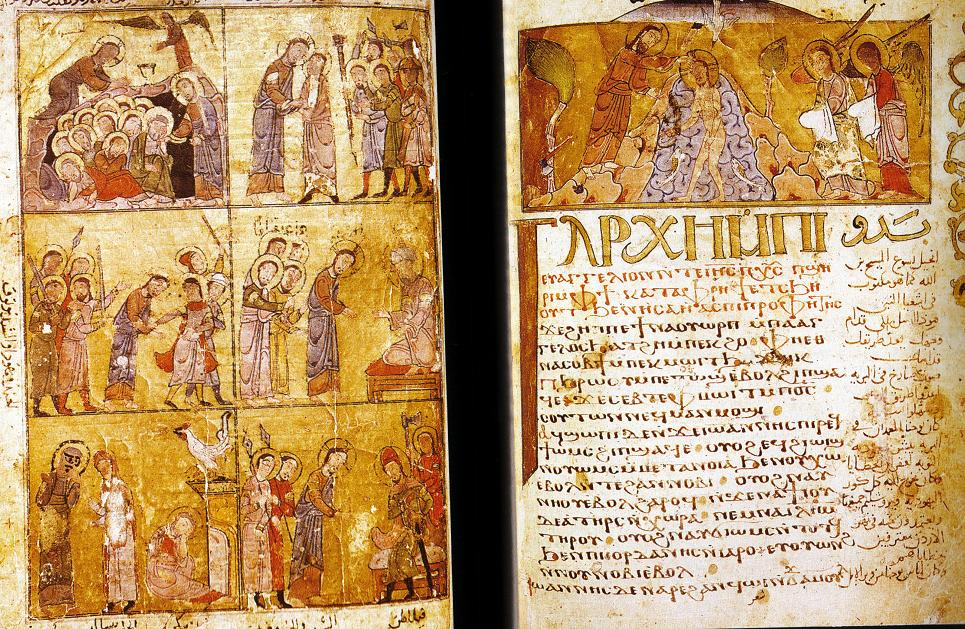
A 13th-century illuminated Bible in Coptic and Arabic

Coptic continued to flourish as a literary language in Egypt until the 13th century. It was supplanted by Egyptian Arabic toward the 16th century but remained part of the education of well-bred Copts until the middle of the 17th century, and was still taught regularly in Coptic schools. In the early 19th century, Coptic was instrumental in Champollion's success in deciphering the Egyptian hieroglyphs. In 1809, Champollion wrote to his brother: "I give myself up entirely to Coptic [...] I wish to know Egyptian like my French, because on that language will be based my great work on the Egyptian papyri." A Coptic priest and scholar, Youhanna Chiftichi, taught Champollion how to read and write Coptic until he became fluent, to the point of composing his famous Coptic grammar and dictionary, which was submitted for publication in 1815.

=== Early Modern period ===
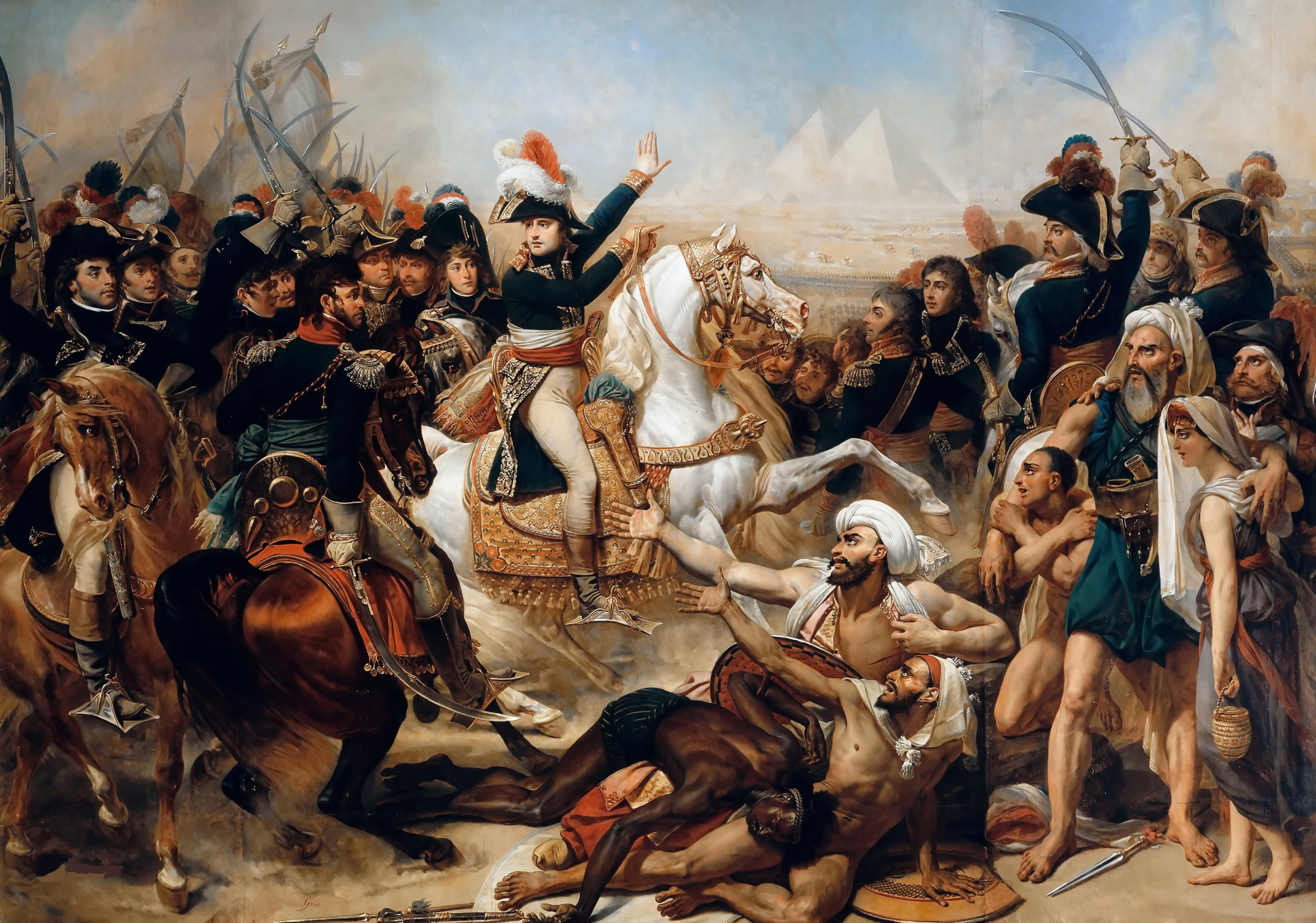
Napoleon at the Pyramids in 1798, by Antoine-Jean Gros

The mistreatment of Christian Copts by their Muslim rulers continued throughout the Middle Ages and into the Early modern period. When Napoleon invaded Egypt in 1798 during the French campaign in Egypt and Syria, a military unit known as the Coptic Legion was formed, composed primarily of members of the Coptic community, and organized for self-defense against the Mamluks, Ottomans, and local groups. During this period, Copts were sometimes accused of sympathizing with European powers due to shared religious affiliation.

The Coptic Legion was led by General Yaqub, a Coptic officer who recruited young Copts from Cairo and Upper Egypt. The Legion was trained by French military instructors and, along with the Greek Legion, formed part of the Bataillon des Chasseurs d'Orient. After the French withdrawal from Egypt in 1801, members of the Coptic Legion accompanied French forces to France.

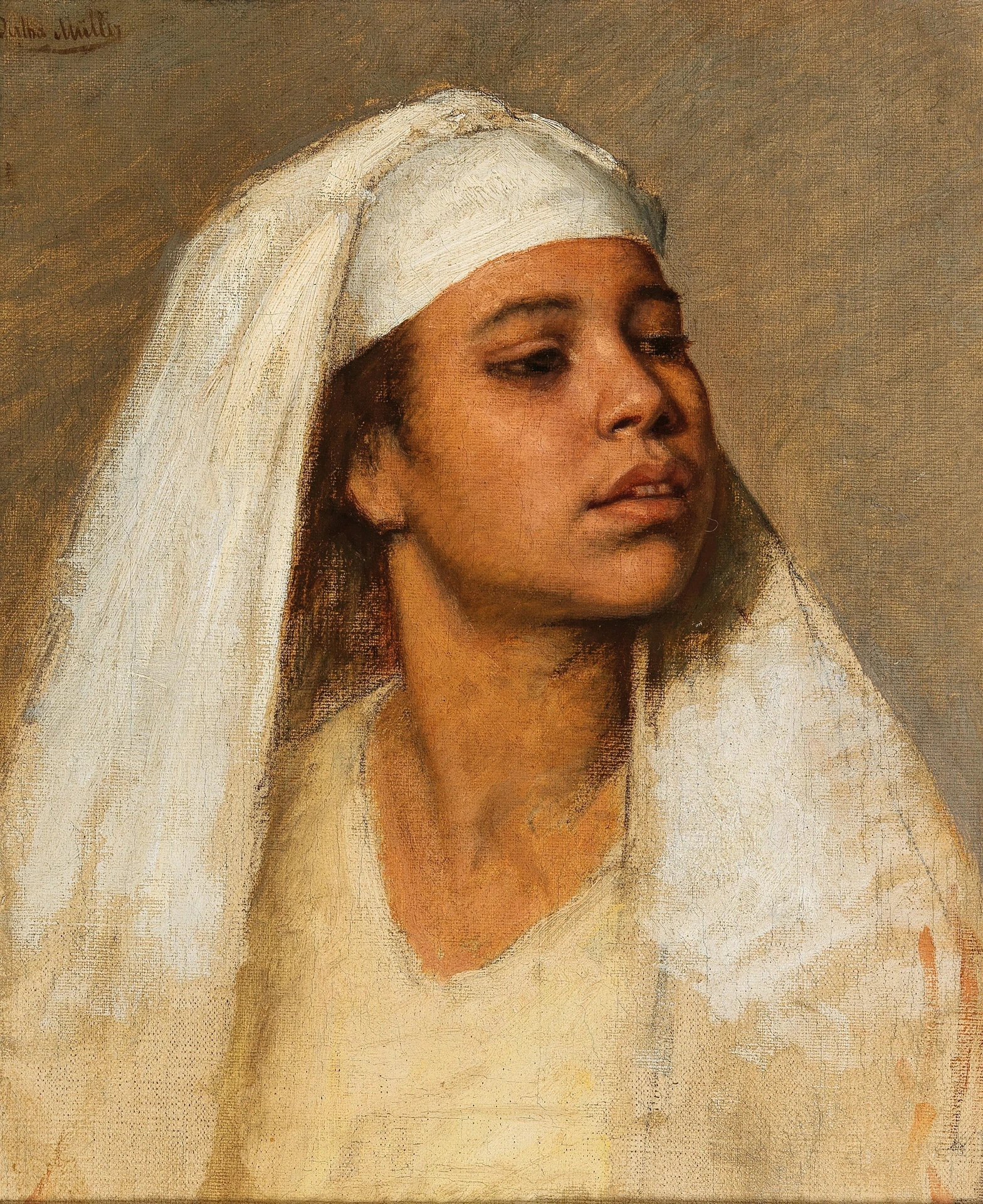
Portrait of a Coptic Christian woman by Bertha Müller, circa 1850

General Yaqub is sometimes regarded as proposing one of the earliest projects for Egyptian independence in the modern era. During his journey to France in 1801, Yaqub discussed the political situation in Egypt with the captain of a British ship and a French officer of Maltese origin. These conversations were later documented in letters now held in the British archives. After reaching France, Yaqub’s companions addressed additional letters to Napoleon on behalf of the Egyptian people.

In these letters, Yaqub was presented as the head of a delegation seeking support from European powers for Egyptian independence from Ottoman rule. The documents reflect themes of early Egyptian nationalism, emphasizing Egypt’s ancient heritage, expressing concern over the country's contemporary condition, and stressing Egypt’s historical contributions to global civilization. These communications are among the earliest known proposals for Egyptian independence. However, the initiative ultimately failed due to the collapse of the French expedition and the death of General Yaqub.

=== Egyptian Liberal Age ===
The flag of Egyptian nationalist revolutionaries during the 1919 revolution. It displays both the crescent representing Muslim Egyptians and the cross representing Christian Egyptians

Egypt's struggle for independence from the Ottoman Empire and Britain was characterized by a secular form of Egyptian nationalism, often referred to as Pharaonism. When Egyptian nationalist leader Saad Zaghlul met Arab delegates at the Paris Peace Conference in 1919, he emphasized that Egypt’s case was distinct and not part of a broader Arab struggle.

When Zaghlul was exiled by the British to Malta in 1919, several prominent Christian Coptic figures were exiled alongside him, including Wissa Wassef and George Khayat, both leading members of the nationalist movement. Upon his return, Zaghlul was joined by other Copts, including Sinout Hanna, Wassef Ghali, Morcos Hanna, and Makram Ebeid, in continuing the opposition to British rule. Later, in 1921, when Zaghlul was exiled to the Seychelles, Makram Ebeid was exiled with him.

The participation of Coptic figures in the Egyptian nationalist movement underscored the unified cross-religious opposition to colonial rule. The events culminated in the 1919 revolution, which was marked by widespread demonstrations uniting Egyptians of different faiths. In his memoirs, Fakhri 'Abd al-Nur recounted the impact of Zaghlul's declaration of "equal responsibilities and equal rights" for Copts and Muslims at the onset of the revolution.

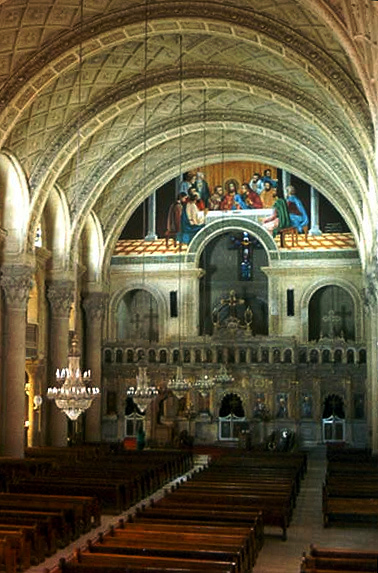
St. Mark Coptic Cathedral in Alexandria

The preacher of the 1919 Revolution was a Coptic priest, Father Morcos Sergius, who had previously been exiled by the British in 1915.

In April 1922, the British ordered the execution of seven Egyptian nationalists, four of whom were Copts: Wissa Wassef, Wassef Ghali, George Khayat, and Morcos Hanna. Egypt formally gained independence from Britain and the Ottoman Empire on 28 February 1922. The participation of Copts and Muslims alike in this nationalist movement emphasized a strong Egyptian identity that transcended religious affiliation.

Egyptian nationalism gained further prominence in the 1920s and 1930s. It often invoked Egypt’s pre-Islamic past and presented Egypt as part of a larger Mediterranean civilization. This ideology highlighted the roles of the Nile River and the Mediterranean Sea in shaping Egyptian identity and became dominant among anti-colonial activists of the period. Arab identity was not a significant component of Egyptian nationalism at that time, and Egyptians generally perceived themselves as distinct from Arabs.

Contemporary observers also noted this distinction. Sati' al-Husri, a prominent Syrian Arab nationalist, observed that "Egyptians did not accept that Egypt was a part of the Arab lands, and would not acknowledge that the Egyptian people were part of the Arab nation." Many leading figures of Egyptian liberalism in the early twentieth century were Copts, including Salama Moussa and Makram Ebeid.

=== Rise of Arab nationalism ===
Virtually no Egyptian, and particularly no Copt, self-identified as "Arab" before the second half of the twentieth century. Egyptians historically maintained a strong sense of continuity with their ancient Egyptian ancestors. Many prominent Egyptian intellectuals in the early twentieth century adopted a form of Egyptian nationalism, identifying as "Coptic Muslims" and rejecting pan-Arabism. Taha Hussein, known as the "Dean of Arabic Literature," stated in his 1936 work The Future of Culture in Egypt that "For Egyptians, Arabic is virtually a foreign language; nobody speaks it at home, school, in the streets, or in clubs. [...] People everywhere speak a language that is not Arabic, despite the partial resemblance to it." Ahmed Lutfi el-Sayed, the first director of the Egyptian University, also emphasized that Egyptians were distinct from Arabs, asserting the existence of separate cultural and historical identities.

Arab nationalism gained influence in Egypt during the 1940s through the efforts of Syrian, Palestinian, and Lebanese intellectuals. Nevertheless, by the late 1940s, even after the establishment of the Arab League, historian H. S. Deighton observed that "Egyptians are not Arabs, and both they and the Arabs are aware of this fact."

Arab nationalism became a central element of state policy during the presidency of Gamal Abdel Nasser beginning in the 1950s. Under Nasser, Egypt briefly united with Syria to form the United Arab Republic in 1958, and in 1961 Egypt adopted the name "Arab Republic of Egypt." Public support for Arab nationalism, however, declined following Egypt’s defeat in the 1967 Six-Day War. Under Nasser’s successor, Anwar Sadat, Egyptian national identity was reemphasized, particularly through policies distancing Egypt from broader Arab nationalist initiatives. Sadat’s rhetoric and policies, including the Egypt–Israel peace treaty, reaffirmed Egypt’s distinct national identity, and references to "Arabism" became less prominent in political discourse.

== Copts and Arab identity ==
Coptic Orthodox Cross with traditional Coptic script reading: 'Jesus Christ, the Son of God'

While some scholars argue that Copts in Egypt often express an Arab identity, others note that Copts living in the diaspora, particularly in Western countries, are more likely to identify as non-Arab, other non-Coptic scholars disagree, stating that "Copts are not Arabs" and that they predate the Arabs' arrival to Egypt.

They viewed Arabs as invaders and foreigners, and glorified the struggles of their ancestors against the Arab invaders between the 7th and the 9th centuries AD. Indubitably, the struggle against these foreign ideologies centered around the Coptic language:

The Coptic language provides a Copt with an identity that spells out an impressive commentary upon the character of such person. It exemplifies in him an unyielding spirit that was tried and came out victorious. A spirit that had to endure endless attempts by those that ruled Egypt for the past 2300 years to replace such language with that of their own. If such was achieved then they can subject the Copts to cultural and religious slavery that would forever made them subservient to such foreign rulers. It was attempted first by the Greeks, through their Hellenizing approach. Then it was continued along the same principles by the successive Arab and Muslim dynasties that ruled Egypt since the 7th century AD. The significance of such character can also inspire the Coptic youth to fight off the many harmful pressures, whether in spirit or in body, that are facing them in this turbulent Society of ours.

In addition, some Copts resisted Arab nationalism by stressing their pre-Arab identity. They saw themselves as the direct descendants of the ancient Egyptians, and their language as a bridge linking the Copts to their Ancient Egyptian roots and their civilization that span over 6,000 years.

The strongest statement regarding Coptic identity came in 2008 from a prominent Coptic bishop, namely Bishop Thomas of Cusae and Meir, who gave the following speech at the Hudson Institute:

What makes a person change the identity of his own nation and shift the focus of his identity from Egypt to become "the Arabs", even though ethnically he/she is the same person? The Copts have been always focused on Egypt; it's our identity, it's our nation, it's our land, it's our language, it's our culture. But when some of the Egyptians converted to Islam, their focus changed away from looking to their own [language and culture]. They started to look to the Arabians, and Arabia became their main focus. So the focus here has changed and they would no longer be called "Copts". If you come to a Coptic person and tell him that he's an Arab, that's offensive. We are not Arabs, we are Egyptians. I am very happy to be an Egyptian and I would not accept being "Arab" because ethnically I am not. I speak Arabic. Politically now, I am part of a country that was Arabized and politically I belong to an Arabic country but that doesn't make a person Arab. If a person believes he is an Arab, his main focus is the pan-Arab area, and he no longer belongs to the Egyptian nation. You are either in or out; either you belong or you don't. And this is a big dilemma that is happening for the Copts who kept their Christianity, or rather their identity as Egyptians with their own culture, and who are trying to keep the language, the music, and the calendar of the Copts. That means that the culture of Ancient Egypt is still carried on. A process of Arabization has been ongoing in this country for many centuries, since the 7th century. At the same time Islamization as well is a dilemma that started and is still carrying a lot of the problems. [...] So when we hear the word "Copt", that doesn't only mean "Christian", it means "Egyptian".

What makes an Egyptian become a Copt, and an Egyptian not become a Copt? Simply, this is the shift that has happened in Egypt since the Arab invasion of Egypt. Today when you look at a Copt, you don't see only a Christian, but you see an Egyptian who is trying to keep his identity versus another imported identity that is working on him. And that means if these two processes are still actively working till now, it has never stopped because Egypt has not yet in its own mind become completely Islamized or Arabized. That means the process [of Arabization] is still ongoing... You can't study the Coptic language, the native language of the land, in any public school in Egypt. That's not allowed, although we can teach in our public schools any other language. You have a lot of schools that teach English, French, German, Spanish and Greek, but never Coptic. Why? Because that clashes with the process of Arabization. And this is a very dangerous attitude. The cultural heritage of Egypt has been taken away. [Thus], the Copts suddenly felt that they have a responsibility to carry on their own culture and continue it and to fight for it. Yes, we are still fighting very much for our strong heritage of Egypt because we love our heritage and we want to keep it. And that means that if you try to teach your language in a public school, that would not be the right way to do it, so that means that the Church will carry the responsibility to take in this heritage and work with it, keeping it in a very good nursery till the time would come when openness and good thinking would occur, when this country will come back to its own roots and lift it up. But, until then we have to keep it in a nursery, in a church. We don't want to keep it in, we don't want to isolate it, but we cannot throw it away so nobody will take care of it. That's why we keep it. This is not withdrawal. We could say that this is keeping the heritage in a nursery till the time comes when it will be open and serve the entire Egyptian community. So the word "Copt" here is not only religious, but it has cultural import.

Bishop Thomas' words gained widespread approval within the Coptic community. One other Coptic bishop, namely Bishop Picenti of Helwan and Massarah commented on the issue saying:

If one reconsiders Bishop Thomas' words, they can discover that he was not wrong. He said that Copts of Egypt are not of Arab origin but rather of Pharaonic origin, and this is correct because it is the truth and history. We are Coptic Egyptians. We are Pharaonic Copts. Coptic meaning ancient Egyptian who then converted to Christianity. Copt, is essentially another term for Coptic Christians.

Other prominent Coptic figures who supported Bishop Thomas' statement included the Coptic writer Magdy Khalil who wrote in el-Dostoor newspaper:

We [the Copts] are Egyptians, and we are not Arabs, with all due respect to the Arabs. We may live in some sort of cultural Arabism and we may speak Arabic, but we are not Arabs. This is a historical fact, whether some people like it or not. Copts both within Egypt and in the diaspora are insulted and accused because they insist on holding strongly to and taking pride in their national Egyptian identity, rather than having another identity that crosses the borders [of Egypt]. The Copts focus their identity on Egypt's geographical borders, which are deeply rooted in history.

== See also ==
- Copts
- Egyptians
- Christianity in Egypt
- Coptic nationalism
- Pharaonism
- Egyptian nationalism
- Liberalism in Egypt
