= Egyptian nationalism =

Egyptian nationalist ideology

Flag of Egypt

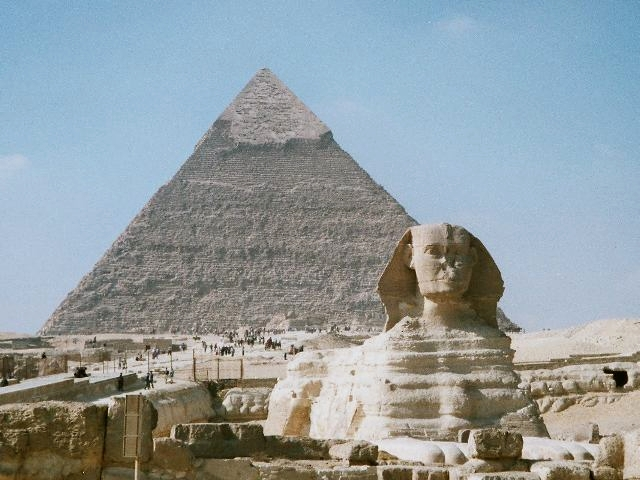
The Great Sphinx and the pyramids of Giza are among the most recognizable symbols of the civilization of Egypt. They remain important Egyptian cultural symbols

The flag of modern Egyptian nationalist revolutionaries during the Egyptian Revolution of 1919. It displays both the Islamic crescent represents Muslim Egyptians and the Christian cross represents Christian Egyptians

Egyptian nationalism is nationalism among the people of Egypt and individuals whose national identity is Egyptian. It is a national ideology rooted in a shared Egyptian culture, history, and geography; it emphasizes national unity of the Egyptian people, irrespective of religion. Over millennia, this nationalism has evolved through distinct phases and competing visions regarding Egyptian identity.

== Egyptian identity ==
Egyptian identity since the Bronze Age Egyptian Empire evolved for the longest period under the influence of native Egyptian culture, religion, and identity (see Ancient Egypt). The Egyptians subsequently came under the influence of a succession of foreign rulers, including the Persians, the Greco-Macedonians, the Romans, and the Arab Caliphates. Under these foreign rulers, the Egyptians accommodated three new religions, Christianity, Judaism, and Islam, and produced a new language, Egyptian Arabic. By the 4th century, the majority of the Egyptians had converted to Christianity, and in 535 the Roman Emperor Justinian ordered the Temple of Isis at Philae closed, which marked the formal end of the ancient religion of Egypt.

Ankh

In the 14th century, it was reported that nominally Muslim peasants would go burn incense at night in front of the Sphinx while uttering prayers which were said to empower the Sphinx to speak, which led a Sufi holy man to attack the Sphinx. Local legends claimed the attack on the Sphinx led to a massive sand storm at Giza, which only ended with the holy man's lynching. The belief in the magical powers of the Pyramids and other ancient ruins helped to preserve them, as some Egyptians warned of dire consequences should they be destroyed and concluded that the monuments were best left untouched. Such beliefs reflected a degree of pride in Egypt's ancient past. In the Middle Ages, Egyptians also created a story that assigned the Pharaoh in the religious texts a foreign, Persian origin, a way of salvaging pride despite the Quran's condemnation of him. To protect the ruins, they frequently attributed them to Islamic figures, recasting them as quasi-Islamic sites shielded from destruction.

Because knowledge of the hieroglyphs was lost from the 6th century until 1822 when Jean-François Champollion deciphered the Rosetta Stone, the memory of ancient Egypt was that of an impressive civilization which built various monuments whose precise meaning had long since been lost, limiting the extent of popular identification with it. Mohammad Ali the Great, the Albanian tobacco merchant turned Ottoman vali (governor) of Egypt and who ruled the country with an iron hand from 1805 until his death in 1849, had no interest in the ruins of ancient Egypt except as a source of gifts for foreign leaders. Likewise, Mohammad Ali had a permissive attitude towards Europeans taking ancient Egyptian relics with them, allowing much plundering of various sites, such as by the Italian Giovanni Battista Belzoni while a diplomatic posting in Cairo was highly sought after owing to opportunities for looting. One of Mohammad Ali's officials, Rifa'a al-Tahtawi, persuaded him in 1836 to embark on preserving Egypt's heritage by ending the plundering of sites in Egypt and to create a museum to display Egypt's treasures instead of letting them be taken to Europe. Tahtawi later published a history of ancient Egypt in 1868, which took advantage of the discoveries of archaeologists and the deciphering of the hieroglyphs, marking the first time that the heritage of ancient Egypt was used as a symbol of national pride in modern Egypt.

== History ==
=== Origins ===
The Egyptian resistance against the Hyksos marked the beginnings of national patriotic ideology, Ahmose I, the founder of the Eighteenth Dynasty of Egypt of the Egyptian Empire, the era in which ancient Egypt achieved the peak of its power. His reign is usually dated to the mid-16th century BC at the beginning of the Late Bronze Age. Ahmose I is considered an Egyptian national hero; he holds a prominent place in Egyptian history and remains highly regarded by the Egyptian people to this day. During his rule, Ahmose completed the conquest and expulsion of the Hyksos, restored Theban rule over Lower- and Upper Egypt, and successfully reasserted Egyptian power in its formerly subject territories of Nubia and Canaan.

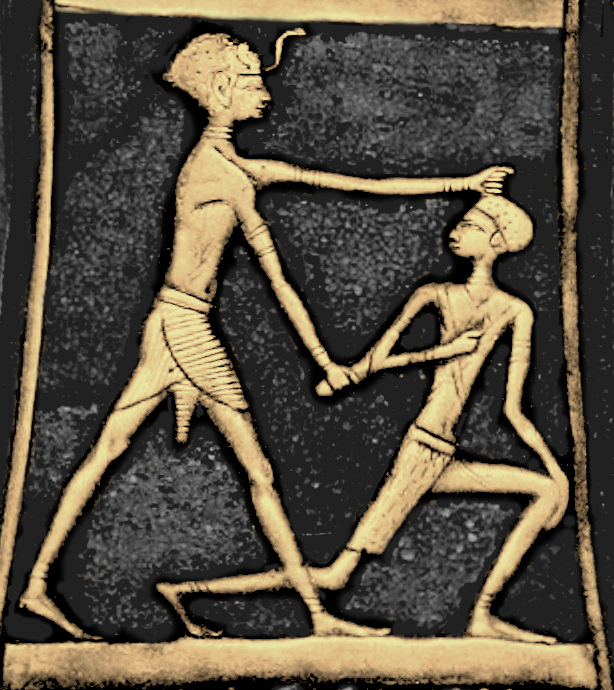
Pharaoh Ahmose I slaying Hyksos

The early Egyptian protonationalism was shaped by foreign invasions and conquests. The Assyrian conquest and the Battle of Carchemish led to the figure of Nebuchadnezzar becoming the archetype of the Eastern conqueror, a figure representing foreign domination, an outsider and a prototypical enemy of Egypt. This was further reinforced by Biblical associations of him being the destroyer of the First Temple in Jerusalem.

The Egyptian attitude towards the subsequent Persian conquest led by Cambyses II and the Macedonian conquest led by Alexander the Great is somewhat conflicting. Herodotus, drawing from native Egyptian tradition, portrays Cambyses, on one hand, as a brutal conqueror, who desecrated sacred Apis bull cult, the view that is also supported by latter Cambyses Romance and the Chronicle of John of Nikiou, where he is also identified with Nebuchadnezzar. On the other hand, Cambyses is depicted as half Egyptian, a grandson of Apries.

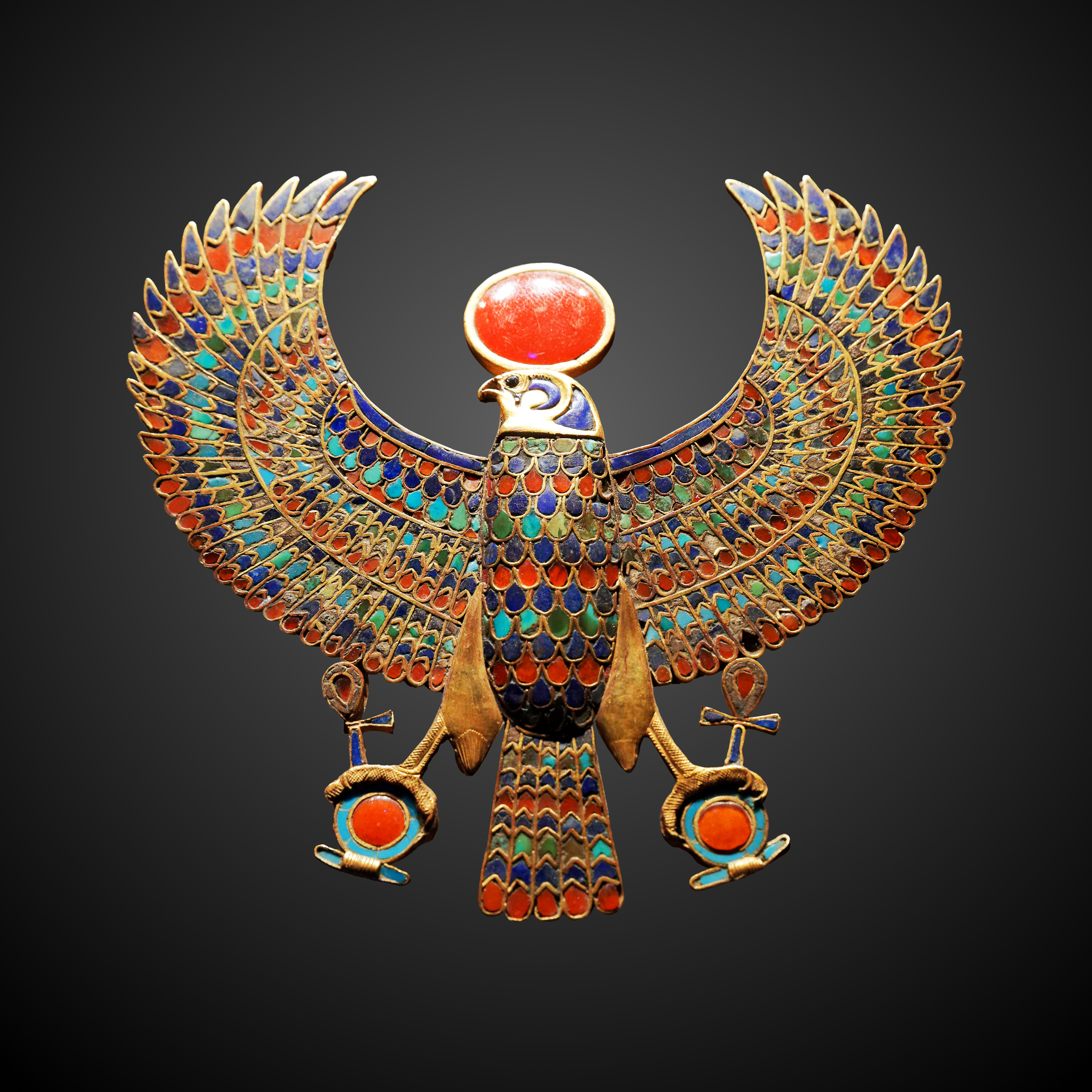
Tutankhamun's Pectoral of Horus with solar disk, Ancient Egypt (c. 1325 BC)

Alexander is portrayed in the same duality – while he is also depicted as half-Egyptian through his alleged father Nectanebo in Alexander Romance, his new capital Alexandria is seen as an evil (or "Typhonic") foundation destined to be destroyed, with Memphis being restored as the rightful seat of the gods. This could be explained by the existence of two traditions – a folk one, trying to Egyptianize foreign conquerors and represent them as a continuation of a native royal tradition, and a priests elite one – portraying hardships of Egypt as a cosmic battle between order and chaos, symbolised by god Set (identified with Typhon). Thus, enemies of Egypt are often labeled "Typhonic" or minions of Seth. This idea is also reflected in Herodotus' description of Egyptian borders – their eastern limit is Lake Serbonis, where Typhon is said to be concealed and where Cambyses beat Egyptian army at the Battle of Pelusium. Avaris, the capital of Hyksos, who conquered Egypt in the 17th century BC, is also described as "Typhonic" by Manetho.

Other texts that could be considered a part of Egyptian "Königsnovelle" and shaped early Egyptian protonationalism are Oracle of the Lamb, Oracle of the Potter and the Dream of Nectanebo.

=== Middle Ages ===
Medieval Egyptian scholars, including Ibn Abd al-Hakam and al-Kindi, produced works in the genre Fada'il Misr, celebrating Egypt’s geography, agricultural wealth, and its status as a cultural hub. These texts highlighted Egypt's historical significance alongside its Islamic identity, promoting a sense of pride. Solidarity among diverse populations emerged during threats like the Crusades and the Mongol invasion, where locals united to defend their land. Cairo, during the Fatimid, Ayyubid and Mamluk dynasties, evolved into a major metropolis, symbolizing political and cultural leadership in the Islamic world.

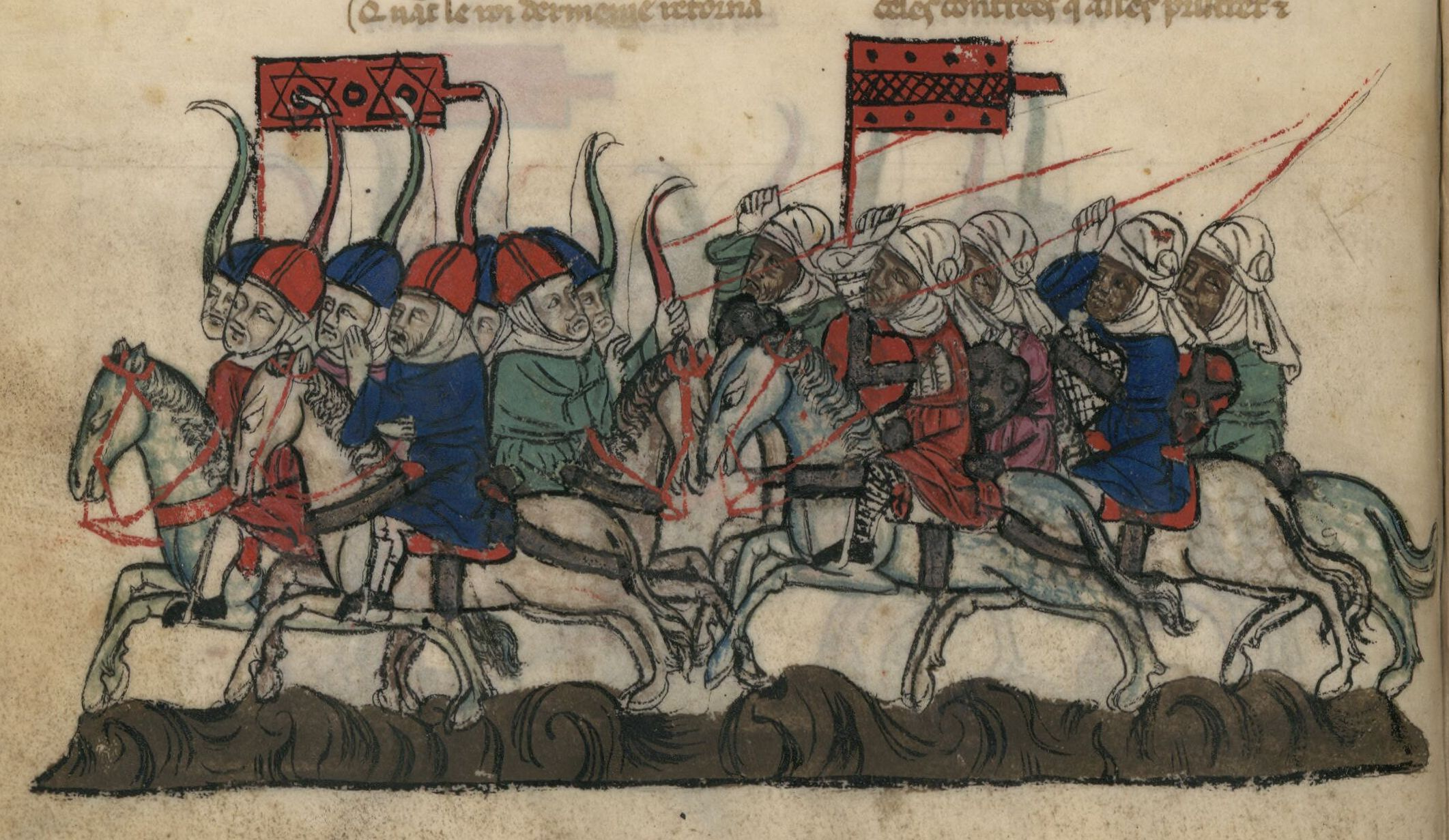
14th-century depiction of the Egyptian Mamluk army chasing the Mongol army at the Battle of Homs in 1281

Despite local military elites at the time were generally of a foreign origin, the Egyptian people retained a unique cultural identity through shared traditions, dialects, and humor, fostering resilience and connection to their land. Shared threats forged strong solidarity among Egyptians, uniting rulers, and local populations, against external enemies. During the 12th and 13th centuries, invasions by European Crusaders, especially the Fifth and Seventh Crusades targeting the cities of Damietta and Mansoura, triggered fierce local mobilization. Ordinary locals volunteered in the army to defend Egyptian soil. When the Mongols threatened to invade Egypt in 1260, the Egyptian Sultan Qutuz rallied Egyptians around the defense of their land and faith, culminating in the historic victory at the Battle of Ain Jalut.

=== Modern ===
Both the Arabic language and the ancient Egyptian language are Afroasiatic languages sharing a common origin. The rule of Muhammad Ali of Egypt led Egypt to a more advanced level of industrialization in comparison with Egypt's neighbors, along with more discoveries of relics of ancient Egyptian civilization. The Urabi movement in the 1870s and 1880s was the first major Egyptian nationalist movement that demanded an end to the alleged despotism of the Muhammad Ali family and demanded curbing the growth of European influence in Egypt, it campaigned under the nationalist slogan of "Egypt for Egyptians".

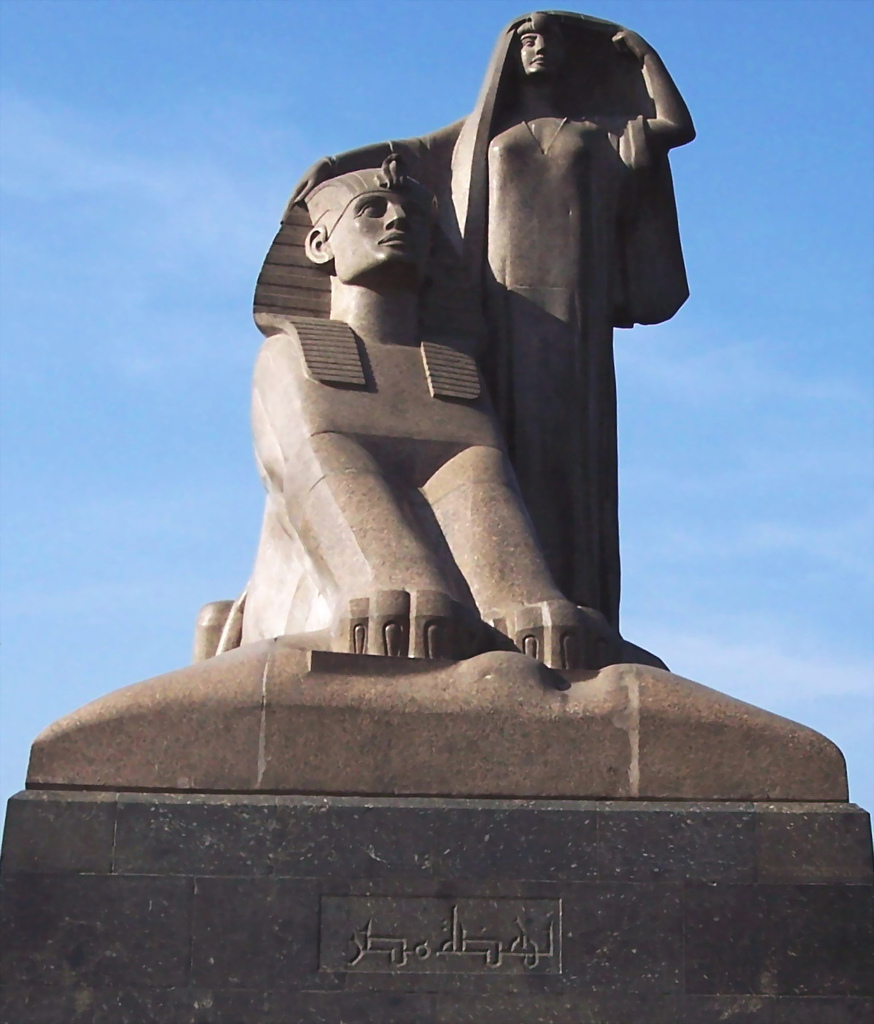
Egyptian Renaissance Statue by Mahmoud Mokhtar, Representing a Woman next to a Sphynx, "Descendants protecting their Ancestors".

One of the key figures in opposing British rule was the Egyptian journalist Yaqub Sanu whose cartoons from 1870s onward satirizing first the Khedive, Ismail the Magnificent, and then Egypt's British rulers as bumbling buffoons were very popular in the 19th century. Sanu was the first to write in Egyptian Arabic, which was intended to appeal to a mass audience, and his cartoons could be easily understood by even the illiterate. Sanu had established the newspaper Abu-Naddara Zarqa, which was the first newspaper to use Egyptian Arabic in March 1877. One of his cartoons mocked Ismail the Magnificent for his fiscal extravagance which caused Egypt's bankruptcy in 1876, leading Ismail, who did not appreciate the cartoon, to order his arrest. Sanu fled to Paris, and continued to publish Abu-Naddara Zarqa there, with its issues being smuggled into Egypt until his death in 1912.

The period between 1860 − 1940 was characterized by El-nahda, renaissance or rebirth. It is best known its renewed interest in Egyptian antiquity and the cultural achievements that were inspired by it. Along with this interest came an indigenous, Egypt-centered orientation, particularly among the Egyptian intelligentsia that would affect Egypt's autonomous development as a sovereign and independent nation-state. The first Egyptian renaissance intellectual was Rifa'a el-Tahtawi. In 1831, Tahtawi undertook a career in journalism, education and translation. Three of his published volumes were works of political and moral philosophy. In them he introduces his students to Enlightenment ideas such as secular authority and political rights and liberty; his ideas regarding how a modern civilized society ought to be and what constituted by extension a civilized or "good Egyptian"; and his ideas on public interest and the public good.

Tahtawi was instrumental in sparking indigenous interest in Egypt's ancient heritage. He composed several poems in praise of Egypt and wrote two other general histories of the country. He also co-founded with his contemporary Ali Mubarak, the architect of the modern Egyptian school system.

=== 20th century ===
After the British occupation of Egypt began in 1882, Egyptian nationalism became focused upon ending the occupation. They had support from Liberals and Socialists in Britain. Wilfrid Scawen Blunt, an anti-imperialist, criticized the British occupation in three widely circulated books: The Secret History of the English Occupation of Egypt... (1907), Gordon at Khartoum (1911), and My Diaries: Being a Personal Narrative of Events, 1888-1914 (2 vols. 1919–20). Historian Robert O. Collins says:

The most vigorous English advocate of Egyptian Independence, Blunt was both arrogant and irascible, his works scathing, discursive, and at times utterly ridiculous. Immature and unfair, both he and his writings must be used with caution, but even the dullest of men will come away stimulated if not aroused and with fresh insights to challenge the sometimes smug attitudes of British officials in Whitehall and Cairo. Of course, to them Blunt was anathema if not disloyal and Edward Malet, the British Consul-General at Cairo from 1879 to 1883, replied to Blunt's charges in his posthumously published Egypt, 1879-1883.

Mustafa Kamil Pasha, A leading Egyptian nationalist of the early 20th century, was greatly influenced by the example of Meiji Japan as an 'Eastern' state that had successfully modernized for Egypt and from the time of the Russian-Japanese war consistently urged in his writings that Egypt emulate Japan. Kamil was also a Francophile like most educated Egyptians of his generation, and the French republican values of liberté, égalité, fraternité influenced his understanding of what it meant to be Egyptian as Kamil defined the Egyptian Identity in terms of loyalty to Egypt. Kamil together with other Egyptian nationalists helped to redefine loyalty to al-watan ("the homeland") in terms stressing the importance of education, nizam (order), and love of al-watan, implicitly criticizing the state created by Mohammad Ali the Great, which was run on very militarist lines. After the Entente Cordial of 1904 ended hopes of French support for Egyptian independence, a disillusioned Kamil looked east towards Japan as a model, defining Egypt as an "Eastern" country occupied by "Western" Great Britain, and suggested in terms that anticipated later Third World nationalism that Egyptians had more in common with people from other places controlled by Western nations such as British India (modern-day India, Pakistan, and Bangladesh) and the Dutch East Indies (modern-day Indonesia) than they did with the nations of Europe.

Egyptian nationalism reached its peak in popularity in 1919 when revolution against British rule took place in response to wartime policies imposed by the British authorities in Egypt during World War I. Three years of protest and political turmoil followed until Britain unilaterally declared the independence of Egypt in 1922 that was a monarchy, though Britain reserved several areas for British supervision. During the period of the Kingdom of Egypt, Egyptian nationalists remained determined to terminate the remaining British presence in Egypt. One of the more noteworthy cases of Egyptian nationalism occurred in December 1922 when the Egyptian government laid claim to the artifacts found in the tomb of King Tutankhamun, which had been discovered by a British archaeologist named Howard Carter in November 1922, arguing that they belonged to Egypt and Carter could not take them to Britain as he planned. The dispute finally led to the Egyptians posting an armed guard outside of Tutankhamun's tomb to prevent Carter from entering it. In February 1924, the Egyptian government seized control of the tomb and with it all of the artifacts found there, saying that they belonged to Egypt. On 6 March 1924, the Prime Minister Saad Zaghloul formally opened the site of Tutankamun's tomb to the Egyptian public in an elaborate ceremony held at night with the sky lit up by floodlights, which reportedly attracted the largest crowd seen in Luxor. The reopening turned into an anti-British demonstration when the British High Commissioner, Field Marshal Allenby, arrived when the crowd was demanding immediate British withdrawal from Egypt. The dispute over who owned King Tutankhamun's treasures took place against the backdrop of a movement in the Egyptian liberal elite known as Pharaonism which extolled ancient Egypt as a national symbol and portrayed Egypt as a Mediterranean nation.

Many prominent Egyptian figures in the first half of the twentieth century adopted Egyptian nationalism and rejected pan-Arabism. Taha Hussein, the Dean of Arabic Literature, stated in his book The Future of Culture in Egypt, published in 1936, that "For Egyptians, Arabic is virtually a foreign language; nobody speaks it at home, school, in the streets, or in clubs. [...] People everywhere speak a language that is not Arabic, despite the partial resemblance to it." Ahmed Lutfi el-Sayed, the first director of the Egyptian University, the director of the Arabic language assembly, member of the senate, and the director of House of Books, insisted that Egyptians are Egyptians and not Arabs. He believed that Egyptians were different from Arabs and had their own separate beliefs, identity and cultural aspects.

The nationalistic Young Egypt Party in the 1930s led by Ahmed Hussein advocated British withdrawal from Egypt and the Sudan, and promised to unite the Arab world under the leadership of Egypt, through the Young Egyptian Society made it clear in the proposed empire, it was Egypt that would dominate, as it was later seen with the brief unification with Syria in 1958. At the same time, It was condemned by Hassan al-Banna, the founder and Supreme Guide of the Muslim Brotherhood, as glorifying a period of jahiliyyah. In a 1937 article, Banna dismissed "Pharaohism" for glorying the "pagan reactionary Pharaohs" like Akhenaten, Ramesses II the Great and Tutankhamun instead of Muhammad and his companions and for seeking to "annihilate" Egypt's Muslim identity.

In January 1952, British forces surrounded an Egyptian police station and demanded they surrender a group of fedayeen guerillas who had taken shelter there and leave the canal zone. After the Egyptians shot and killed a British negotiator, the British commander present ordered an attack on the police station; 50 policemen were killed in the ensuing firefight, and the rest were captured. The capital of Egypt, Cairo, overflowed with anti-British violence in a riot on 26 January 1952 known as the "Black Saturday" or "Cairo Fire" riot. The Black Saturday riots led to the development of the Free Officer movement, consisting of a thousand "middle-level" officers, overthrowing King Farouk. After the Egyptian Revolution of 1952 that overthrew the monarchy and established a republic, Gamal Abdel Nasser rose to power on themes that were based on Arab nationalism. Nasser saw Egypt as the leader of the Arab states and saw Egypt's role as promoting Arab solidarity against both the West and Israel.

In 1952 Nasser produced a half programmatic entitled The Philosophy of the Revolution. It offers and account to how he and other officers who overthrew the monarchy on July 23 of that year came to a decision to seize power and how they planned to use their newly won power. Under Nasser, Egypt's Arab identity was greatly played up, and Nasser promoted a policy of pan-Arabism, arguing that all of the Arab peoples should be united together in a single state under his leadership. Egypt was briefly united with Syria under the name the United Arab Republic from 1958 until 1961 when Syria abandoned the union. Nasser saw himself as the successor of Mohammad Ali Pasha, who had sought to found a new dynasty to rule the Ottoman Empire in the 19th century. Nasser came to embrace pan-Arabism as the best way to liberate Egypt and the Arab world from imperialistic control and to achieve great power status; Nasser viewed the Arab world as so intertwined that it is effectively "One Nation divided by colonial powers".

Nasser's successors, Anwar Sadat and Hosni Mubarak continued to emphasize Arab nationalism and identity but based on Egypt's distinctiveness within the Arab world as Sadat changed Egypt's official name from the "United Arab Republic" to the "Arab republic of Egypt". Sadat, upon taking office in 1970, announced that his first policy would be "Egypt first". In December 1970, Sadat announced in a speech that Egypt would be willing to make peace with Israel provided the latter returned the Sinai peninsula, making no mention of the West Bank, Gaza Strip or the Golan Heights. Sadat in a speech said

Let there be no more war or bloodshed between Arabs and Israelis. Let there be no more suffering or denial of rights. Let there be no more despair or loss of faith.

After the 1973 October War had boosted his image and the Egyptian army's image in Egypt, Sadat began a comprehensive attack on Nasser's legacy, including his pan-Arabist policies, which were portrayed as having dragged Egypt into poverty, a long grinding war in Yemen, and subservience to the Soviet Union. In contrast to the secularist Nasser, Sadat began a policy of playing up Egypt's Muslim identity, having the constitution amended in 1971 to say that Sharia law was "a main source of all state legislation" and in 1980 to say that Sharia law was the main source of all legislation which was controversial in Egypt with many opposing it, although over time Egypt would become more conservative following the discovery of oil in Gulf states, which led to Egyptians going there for work and returning with the conservative Muslim ideology of Wahhabism. Though Sadat was not an Islamic fundamentalist, under his rule Islam started to be portrayed as the cornerstone of Egyptian national identity. Sadat had chosen to launch what Egyptians call the Ramadan/October War in 1973 during the Muslim holy month of Ramadan and the code-name for the initial assault on the Israeli Bar Lev Line on the Suez Canal was Operation Badr, after Muhammad's first victory, both gestures that would have been unthinkable under Nasser as Sadat chose to appeal to Islamic feelings. Sadat and Mubarak also abandoned Nasser's conflict with Israel and the West. Sadat chose to engage in Islamism as he released Islamists from prisons to combat Communist influence.

== See also ==
- Coptic nationalism
- Ahmed Lutfi el-Sayed
- Arab nationalism
- Coptic identity
- Egyptian Revolution of 1919
- Egyptian Revolution of 1952
- Gamal Abdel Nasser
- Pharaonism
- Saad Zaghloul
- Taha Hussein

== Bibliography ==
- Fahamy, Ziad (2008). "Francophone Egyptian Nationalists, Anti-British Discourse, and European Public Opinion, 1885-1910: The Case of Mustafa Kamil and Ya'qub Sannu". Comparative Studies of South Asia, Africa and the Middle East. 28 (1): 170–183. doi:10.1215/1089201x-2007-063.
- Laffan, Michael (1999). "Mustafa and the Mikado: A Francophile Egyptian's turn to Meiji Japan". Japanese Studies. 19 (3): 269–286. doi:10.1080/10371399908727682.
- Motyl, Alexander J. (2001). Encyclopedia of Nationalism, Volume II. Academic Press. ISBN 0-12-227230-7.
- Lin Noueihed, Alex Warren. The Battle for the Arab Spring: Revolution, Counter-Revolution and the Making of a New Era. Yale University Press, 2012.
- Parkinson, Brian (2008). "Tutankhamen on Trial: Egyptian Nationalism and the Court Case for the Pharaoh's Artifacts". Journal of the American Research Center in Egypt. 44: 1–8.
