= Fakhri 'Abd al-Nur =

Egyptian politician (1881–1942)

- فخري عبد النور
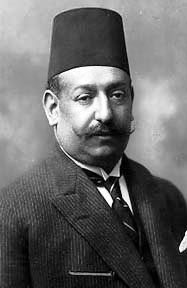
- Born: 15 June 1881
- Died: 9 December 1942 (aged 61)

Fakhri 'Abd al-Nur (Note: Arabic: فخري عبد النور) (15 June 1881 – 9 December 1942) was a Coptic Egyptian politician.
