= Coptic nationalism =

Egyptian national ideology

Coptic nationalism refers to the cultural and political expression of the Egyptian Copts, a large ethnic Christian religious minority in Egypt. Rather than advocating for an independent nation-state, Coptic nationalism emphasizes equal citizenship and representation within the Egyptian state. Copts are geographically dispersed across Egypt, with the highest concentrations in Cairo, Alexandria, and Upper Egypt. Most belong to the Coptic Orthodox Church of Alexandria, and estimates place the Coptic population at 10–15% of Egypt's 104 million citizens.

Copts and Muslims in Egypt have coexisted for centuries, sharing a common national culture and history. However, following the 1960s, intercommunal tensions grew, particularly under the administrations of Nasser, Sadat, and Mubarak, during which Copts reported increased political and social marginalization. As a result, Copts have sought greater political representation and protection. Some migrated abroad, particularly to the United States, while others have remained politically active within Egypt despite ongoing challenges.

== Pharaonism ==
In the early 20th century, the ideology of Pharaonism emerged as a cultural expression of Egyptian identity rooted in its ancient, pre-Islamic past. The movement emphasized Egypt’s civilizational ties to the Mediterranean world, which some Copts used to affirm their historical continuity in Egypt and distinguish their identity from broader Arab nationalism. Although influential in the 1920s, the Pharaonist paradigm has been critiqued by modern scholars as a product of Orientalist thought with limited resonance in contemporary Egypt.

== Coptic identity ==
Coptic political participation increased during the 1919 Egyptian revolution, with figures such as Boutros Ghali and Youssef Wahba serving in senior political positions. Despite individual efforts to cooperate with British authorities, most Copts advocated for a unified Egyptian identity irrespective of religion.

The articulation of a distinct Coptic identity gained momentum in the 1950s, partly in response to Gamal Abdel Nasser’s pan-Arabist policies, which some Copts viewed as marginalizing Egypt’s pre-Islamic heritage. The state’s Islamic orientation and exclusion of Copts from political life further reinforced the development of a separate communal consciousness.

Contemporary Coptic identity continues to be shaped by experiences of underrepresentation, sectarian violence, and cultural memory. Religious symbolism, particularly referencing early Christian persecution, remains central to this identity and is frequently expressed through communal rituals and protest slogans. Public demonstrations, such as those during the Maspero demonstrations and the Arab Spring, have highlighted the role of activism in expressing demands for equal rights.

Although Coptic nationalism affirms a distinct communal identity, it does not seek separatism or statehood.

== See also ==
- Coptic diaspora
- Coptic identity
- Coptic Legion
- Pharaonism

== Bibliography ==
- Shatzmiller, Maya (2005). Nationalism and Minority Identities in Islamic Societies. McGill-Queen's Press.
- Lin Noueihed, Alex Warren. The Battle for the Arab Spring: Revolution, Counter-Revolution and the Making of a New Era. Yale University Press, 2012.
- Jacques van der Vliet (2010). The Copts: 'Modern Sons of the Pharaohs'?
- J.D. Pennington (1982). The Copts in Modern Egypt
- E.J. Chitham (1986). The Copts as a Minority group in The Coptic Community in Egypt
- Charles D. Smith (2005). The Egyptian Copts: Nationalism, Ethnicity, and Definition of Identity for a Religious Minority in Nationalism and Minority Identities in Islamic Societies. McGill-Queens's Press.
- F.F. Andrawes & A. Orr-Andrawes (2019). 'Two communities, one nation' Coptic Christians and Muslims in Egypt'. American University in Cairo Press.
