= Pharaonism =

Egyptian nationalist ideology

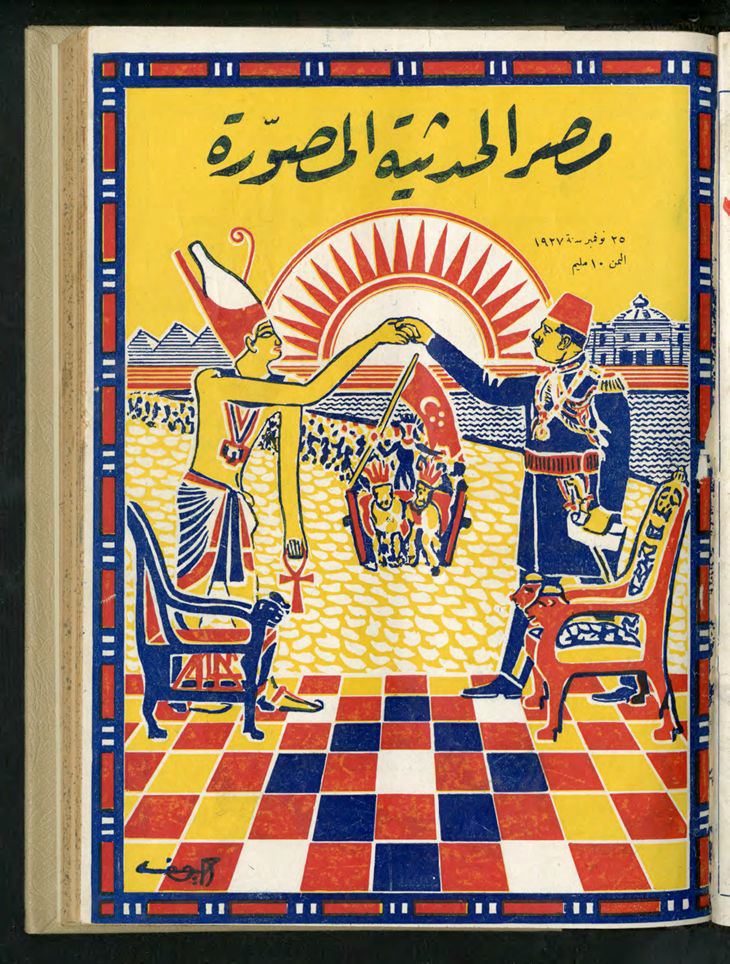
Cover of "Modern Egypt Illustrated" Magazine, showing Pharaoh and King Fuad holding hands | Miṣr al-Hadīthah no.02 1927

Pharaonism is an ideology that rose to prominence in Egypt in the 1920s and 1930s. A version of Egyptian nationalism, it argued for the existence of an Egyptian national continuity from ancient history to the modern era, stressing the role of ancient Egypt and incorporating anti-colonial sentiment. Pharaonism's most notable advocate was Taha Hussein.

== Egyptian identity ==
Egyptian identity since the Bronze Age Egyptian Empire evolved for the longest period under the influence of native Egyptian culture, religion, and identity (see Ancient Egypt). The Egyptians subsequently came under the influence of a succession of foreign rulers, including the Persians, the Greco-Macedonians, the Romans, and the Arab Caliphates. Under these foreign rulers, the Egyptians accommodated three new religions, Christianity, Judaism, and Islam, and produced a new language, Egyptian Arabic. By the 4th century, the majority of the Egyptians had converted to Christianity, and in 535 the Roman Emperor Justinian ordered the Temple of Isis at Philae closed, which marked the formal end of the ancient religion of Egypt.

During the Middle Ages, the monuments of the ancient Egyptian civilization were destroyed as remnants of a time of jahiliyyah ("pre-Islamic ignorance"). The majority of the destruction of the ruins occurred in the 13th and 14th centuries, a time of floods, famines, and plagues in Egypt, leading some people to believe that Allah was punishing the Egyptians for the continued existence of these relics of a time of jahiliyyah. The most notable acts of destruction in the Middle Ages were the tearing down of a statue of the goddess Isis in 1311 in Fustat and the destruction of a temple in Memphis in 1350, which inspired much relief when it was discovered the "evil eye" (the eye of Horus) on the temple's walls did not cause the deaths of those destroying the temple as feared.

The Quran singled out the Pharaoh whose story is related in the Book of Exodus as an especially vicious tyrant opposed to Allah, and in general the Pharaohs are portrayed in Islamic tradition as depraved despots reveling in jahiliyyah. Several Muslim leaders such as the Caliph Yazid III ordered the destruction of all the pharaonic monuments. However, there is considerable evidence of popular local pride in monuments such as the Giza Pyramids and the Sphinx, so much so that these monuments were never destroyed out of fear of causing riots. The monuments of Pharaonic Egypt were generally seen as possessing magical powers and were viewed as objects of respect by ordinary Egyptians, despite the fact that the Quran execrates ancient Egyptian beliefs (such as polytheism and the worship of Pharaohs) as an especially reprehensible period of jahiliyyah. As late as 1378, it was reported that nominally Muslim peasants would go burn incense at night in front of the Sphinx while uttering prayers which were said to empower the Sphinx to speak, which led a Sufi holy man to attack the Sphinx. Local legends claimed the attack on the Sphinx led to a massive sand storm at Giza, which only ended with the holy man's lynching. The belief in the magical powers of the Pyramids and other ancient ruins helped to preserve them, as some Egyptians warned of dire consequences should they be destroyed and concluded that the monuments were best left untouched. Such beliefs reflected a degree of pride in Egypt's ancient past. In the Middle Ages, Egyptians also created a story that assigned the Pharaoh in the religious texts a foreign, Persian origin, a way of salvaging pride despite the Quran's condemnation of him. To protect the ruins, they frequently attributed them to Islamic figures, recasting them as quasi-Islamic sites shielded from destruction.

Because knowledge of the hieroglyphs was lost from the 6th century until 1822 when Jean-François Champollion deciphered the Rosetta Stone, the memory of ancient Egypt was that of an impressive civilization which built various monuments whose precise meaning had long since been lost, limiting the extent of popular identification with it. Mohammad Ali the Great, the Albanian tobacco merchant turned Ottoman vali (governor) of Egypt and who ruled the country with an iron hand from 1805 until his death in 1849, had no interest in the ruins of ancient Egypt except as a source of gifts for foreign leaders. Likewise, Mohammad Ali had a permissive attitude towards Europeans taking ancient Egyptian relics with them, allowing much plundering of various sites, such as by the Italian Giovanni Battista Belzoni while a diplomatic posting in Cairo was highly sought after owing to opportunities for looting. One of Mohammad Ali's officials, Rifa'a al-Tahtawi, persuaded him in 1836 to embark on preserving Egypt's heritage by ending the plundering of sites in Egypt and to create a museum to display Egypt's treasures instead of letting them be taken to Europe. Tahtawi later published a history of ancient Egypt in 1868, which took advantage of the discoveries of archaeologists and the deciphering of the hieroglyphs, marking the first time that the heritage of ancient Egypt was used as a symbol of national pride in modern Egypt.

== Nationalism ==
Questions of identity came to the fore in the 20th century as Egyptians sought to end the British occupation of Egypt, leading to the rise of ethno-territorial secular Egyptian nationalism (also known as "Pharaonism"). Pharaonism became the dominant mode of expression by Egyptian anti-colonial activists of the pre- and inter-war periods, according to modern historian and University of Colorado professor James P. Jankowski;

"What is most significant [about Egypt in this period] is the absence of an Arab component in early Egyptian nationalism. The thrust of Egyptian political, economic, and cultural development throughout the nineteenth century worked against, rather than for, an "Arab" orientation... This situation—that of divergent political trajectories for Egyptians and Arabs—if anything increased after 1900."

Pharaonism celebrated Egypt as a distinct geographic and political unit whose origins went back to the unification of Upper and Lower Egypt in about 3100 BC, and which presented Egypt as more closely linked to Europe rather than to the Middle East. The focus on the ancient Egyptian past was used as a symbol of Egyptian distinctiveness, which was used to down-play Arab and Islamic identities, and was intended to brand Egypt as a European rather than a Near Eastern nation. Pharaonism first appeared in the early 20th century in the writings of Mustafa Kamil Pasha who called Egypt the world's first state and Ahmed Lutfi el-Sayed who wrote about a "pharaonic core" surviving in modern Egypt.

In 1931, following a visit to Egypt, Syrian Arab nationalist Sati' al-Husri remarked that:

"[Egyptians] did not possess an Arab nationalist sentiment; did not accept that Egypt was a part of the Arab lands, and would not acknowledge that the Egyptian people were part of the Arab nation."

The later 1930s would become a formative period for Arab nationalism in Egypt, in large part due to efforts by Syrian/Palestinian/Lebanese intellectuals. Nevertheless, a year after the establishment of the League of Arab States in 1945, to be headquartered in Cairo, Oxford University historian H. S. Deighton was still writing:

The Egyptians are not Arabs, and both they and the Arabs are aware of this fact. They are Arabic-speaking, and they are Muslim—indeed religion plays a greater part in their lives than it does in those either of the Syrians. But the Egyptian, during the first thirty years of the [twentieth] century, was not aware of any particular bond with the Arab East... Egypt sees in the Arab cause a worthy object of real and active sympathy and, at the same time, a great and proper opportunity for the exercise of leadership, as well as for the enjoyment of its fruits. But she is still Egyptian first and Arab only in consequence, and her main interests are still domestic.

One of the most prominent Egyptian nationalists and critics of pan-Arabism was Egypt's most notable writer of the 20th century, Taha Hussein. He expressed his disagreement with Arab unity and his beliefs in Egyptian nationalism on multiple occasions. In one of his most well-known articles, written in 1933 in the magazine Kawkab el Sharq, he wrote:

Pharaonism is deeply rooted in the spirits of the Egyptians. It will remain so, and it must continue and become stronger. The Egyptian is Pharaonic before being Arab. Egypt must not be asked to deny its Pharaonism because that would mean: Egypt, destroy your Sphinx and your pyramids, forget who you are and follow us! Do not ask of Egypt more than it can offer. Egypt will never become part of some Arab unity, whether the capital [of this unity] were to be Cairo, Damascus, or Baghdad.

It has been argued that until the 1940s, Egypt was more in favour of territorial, Egyptian nationalism and distant from the pan-Arab ideology. Egyptians generally did not identify themselves as Arabs, and it is revealing that when the Egyptian nationalist leader Saad Zaghlul met the Arab delegates at Versailles in 1918, he insisted that their struggles for statehood were not connected, claiming that the problem of Egypt was an Egyptian problem and not an Arab one.

In February 1924 Zaghloul, now prime minister of Egypt, had all of the treasures found in the tomb of King Tutankhamun seized from the British archaeological team led by Howard Carter under the grounds that the treasures belonged to Egypt and to prevent Carter from taking them to Britain as he wanted. Zaghloul justified the seizure under the grounds that "it is the duty of the government to defend the rights and dignity of the nation". On 6 March 1924, Zaghlul formally opened the tomb of King Tutankhamun to the Egyptian public in an elaborate ceremony held at night with the sky lit up by floodlights, which reportedly attracted the largest crowd ever seen in Luxor. The opening of Tutankhamun's tomb was turned into a nationalist demonstration when the British High Commissioner, Field Marshal Allenby arrived, and was loudly booed by the crowd, who started to demand immediate British evacuation of Egypt. The long dead Tutankhamun was turned by the Wafd Party into a symbol of Egyptian nationalism, which was why Carter's plans to take the treasures from his tomb aroused such opposition in Egypt. However, the case of Tutankhamun's treasures were merely an opportunistic move by Zaghlul at asserting Egyptian independence, which had only been gained in February 1922, against Carter and his team, who were viewed as acting arrogantly towards the Egyptians.

Ahmed Hussein who founded the nationalistic and fascistic Young Egypt Society in 1933 stated that he became interested in Egyptian nationalism after a scouting trip through the Valley of the Kings in 1928, which inspired him with the belief that if Egypt was great once, then it could be great again. The Young Egypt Society glorified the ancient Egyptian past, which was regularly mentioned in party rallies, and in reference to Egypt's Turco-Circassian aristocracy demanded that Egypt have "a leader of action, who is not of Turkish or Circassian blood, but of Pharaonic blood". Initially, the Young Egypt Society had a very particularist interpretation of Egyptian nationalism, which emphasized that Egypt was not just another Muslim and/or Arab nation, but rather having a very distinctive identity owing to the heritage of ancient Egypt. The Young Egypt Society, which was closely modeled along the lines of the fascist movements of Italy and Germany, called for a British withdrawal from Egypt, the union of Egypt and the Sudan, and for Egypt under the banner of Arab nationalism to create an empire stretching from the Atlantic to the Indian oceans. The invocation of the glories of ancient Egypt by the Young Egypt Society was used to explain why the Egyptians were to dominate the proposed pan-Arab state. However, Hussein discovered that Pharaonism appealed only to middle class Egyptians, and limited his party's appeal to the Egyptian masses. Starting in 1940, the Young Egypt Society abandoned Pharaonism and sought to reinvent itself as an Islamic fundamentalist party.

"Pharaonism" was condemned by Hassan al-Banna, the founder and Supreme Guide of the fundamentalist Muslim Brotherhood, as glorifying a period of jahiliyyah, which is the Islamic term for the pre-Islamic past. In a 1937 article, Banna attacked Pharaonism for glorifying the "pagan reactionary Pharaohs" like Akhenaten, Ramesses the Great and Tutankhamun instead of Muhammad and his companions and for seeking to "annihilate" Egypt's Muslim identity. Banna insisted that Egypt could only be part of the wider Islamic ummah ("community") and that any effort to mark Egyptian distinctiveness from the rest of Islamic world was going against the will of Allah.

== Arab identity ==
However, Egypt under King Farouk was a founding member of the Arab League in 1945, and the first Arab state to declare war in support of the Palestinians in the Palestine War of 1948. This Arab nationalist sentiment increased exponentially after the Egyptian Revolution of 1952. The primary leaders of the Revolution, Muhammad Naguib, and Gamal Abdel Nasser, were staunch Arab nationalists who stressed that pride in Egypt's individual indigenous identity was entirely consistent with pride in an overarching Arab cultural identity. It was during Naguib's tenure as leader that Egypt adopted the Arab Liberation Flag to symbolize the country's links to the rest of the Arab World.

In 1958, Egypt and Syria formed the United Arab Republic. When the union was dissolved in 1961, Egypt continued to be known as the UAR until 1971, when Egypt adopted the current official name, the Arab Republic of Egypt. The Egyptians' attachment to Arabism, however, was particularly questioned after the 1967 Six-Day War. Thousands of Egyptians had lost their lives and the country became disillusioned with Pan-Arab politics. Nasser's successor Anwar Al Sadat, both through public policy and his peace initiative with Israel, revived an uncontested Egyptian orientation, unequivocally asserting that only Egypt and Egyptians were his responsibility. The terms "Arab," "Arabism," and "Arab unity," save for the new official name, became conspicuously absent. (See also Liberal age and Republic sections.) Sadat only engaged in Pharaonism for international consumption, such as when he arranged for the mummy of King Ramses the Great to go to Paris for restoration work in 1974; he insisted the French provide an honor guard at Charles de Gaulle airport to fire a 21 gun salute as befitting a head of state when the coffin containing King Ramses' corpse touched French soil. Domestically, Pharaonism was discouraged under Sadat, who closed the mummy room in the Egyptian Museum for offending Muslim sensibilities, though in private Sadat was said to remark that "Egyptian kings are not be made a spectacle of" suggesting a degree of respect for the ancient past.

Although the overwhelming majority of Egyptians today continue to self-identify as Arabs in a linguistic sense, a growing minority reject this, pointing to the failures of Arab and pan-Arab nationalist policies, and even publicly voicing objection to the present official name of the country.

In late 2007, el-Masri el-Yom daily newspaper conducted an interview at a bus stop in the working-class district of Imbaba to ask citizens what Arab nationalism (el-qawmeyya el-'arabeyya) represented for them. One Egyptian Muslim youth responded, "Arab nationalism means that the Egyptian Foreign Minister in Jerusalem gets humiliated by the Palestinians, that Arab leaders dance upon hearing of Sadat's death, that Egyptians get humiliated in Eastern Arabia, and of course that Arab countries get to fight Israel until the last Egyptian soldier." Another felt that "Arab countries hate Egyptians", and that unity with Israel may even be more of a possibility than Arab nationalism, because he believes that Israelis would at least respect Egyptians.

Some contemporary prominent Egyptians who oppose Arab nationalism or the idea that Egyptians are Arabs include Secretary General of the Supreme Council of Antiquities Zahi Hawass, popular writer Osama Anwar Okasha, Egyptian-born Harvard University Professor Leila Ahmed, Member of Parliament Suzie Greiss, in addition to different local groups and intellectuals. This understanding is also expressed in other contexts, such as Neil DeRosa's novel Joseph's Seed in his depiction of an Egyptian character "who declares that Egyptians are not Arabs and never will be."

== Critics of Arab nationalism ==
Egyptian critics of Arab nationalism contend that it has worked to erode and/or relegate native Egyptian identity by superimposing only one aspect of Egypt's culture. These views and sources for collective identification in the Egyptian state are captured in the words of a linguistic anthropologist who conducted fieldwork in Cairo:

Historically, Egyptians have considered themselves as distinct from 'Arabs' and even at present rarely do they make that identification in casual contexts; il-'arab [the Arabs] as used by Egyptians refers mainly to the inhabitants of the Gulf states... Egypt has been both a leader of pan-Arabism and a site of intense resentment towards that ideology. Egyptians had to be made, often forcefully, into "Arabs" [during the Nasser era] because they did not historically identify themselves as such. Egypt was self-consciously a nation not only before pan-Arabism but also before becoming a colony of the British Empire. Its territorial continuity since ancient times, its unique history as exemplified in its pharaonic past and later on its Coptic language and culture, had already made Egypt into a nation for centuries. Egyptians saw themselves, their history, culture and language as specifically Egyptian and not "Arab."

== Copts ==
Many Coptic intellectuals hold to a version of Pharaonism which states that Coptic culture is largely derived from pre-Christian, Ancient Egyptian culture. It gives the Copts a claim to a deep heritage in Egyptian history and culture. However, some Western scholars today see Pharaonism as a late development, arguing that it was shaped primarily by Orientalism, and they doubt its validity.

== Problems as an integrating ideology ==
The Canadian archaeologist Michael Wood argued that one of the principal problems of Pharaonism as an integrating ideology for the population is that it glorifies a period in time too remote for most Egyptians, and moreover, one that lacks visible signs of continuity for the Arabic speaking Muslim majority, such as a common language, culture, or alphabet. Wood noted that the popular belief that ancient Egypt was a "slave state" has been questioned by archaeologists and historians, but this popular image held in both the Islamic and the Western nations of a "slave state" makes identification with this period problematic. The story told in the Book of Exodus of an unnamed Pharaoh whose cruelty led him to enslave the Israelites and whose hubris caused his death when he unwisely attempted to follow Moses across the parting of the Red Sea has led to the Pharaohs being portrayed across the ages as a symbol of tyranny. When President Sadat was assassinated on 6 October 1981 reviewing a military parade in Cairo, his Muslim fundamentalist assassins were heard to shout: "We have killed the Pharaoh!" In Arabic, the verb tafarʽana, meaning to act tyrannically, literally translates as "acting Pharaohically".

Wood wrote that even the surviving ruins of ancient Egypt, consisting mostly of "tombs, palaces and temples, the relics of a death-obsessed, aristocratic, pagan society," seem to confirm the popular image of a "slave state," while the "more sophisticated models of Egyptian history, developed mainly by foreign scholars, remain ignored". The ruins of ancient Egypt, with their pompous and grandiose bragging about the greatness of the god-kings who had them built, give the impression of a society slavishly devoted to serving the kings who proclaimed themselves to be living gods. Wood wrote that it is not certain if this was indeed the case, as Egyptologists know very little about the feelings and thoughts of ordinary people in ancient Egypt, but it is clear that ancient Egypt was a "highly stratified society", which makes it difficult for people today to identify with a society whose values were so different from the present.

One of the principal reasons why Pharaonism went into decline starting in the 1940s was because the Quran condemns ancient Egypt so strongly, making it very difficult for Egyptian Muslims to use the symbols of ancient Egypt without causing accusations of abandoning their faith. Wood wrote that a principal difference between Egypt and Mexico is that Mexicans can and do incorporate elements from Mesoamerican civilizations like the Olmecs, the Maya, and the Mexica (Aztecs), which are seen as part of a national continuity interrupted by the Spanish conquest of 1519–1521 and resumed with independence in 1821, whereas it is impossible for Egyptians to use pharaonic symbols "without being left open to the charges that such symbols were non-Islamic or anti-Islamic". Wood wrote: "Islam and the Egypt of the Pharaohs could be reconciled only with great difficulty; in the end they could not but compete...Egyptian nationalists who wished to look for their ancient history for inspiration would have to start from scratch and would have to distance themselves from an Islamic identity with which the Pharaonic past could not really coexist with".

Another problem was posed by the way in which almost all of the archaeological work on ancient Egypt in the 19th century and the first half of the 20th century was done by foreign archaeologists who discouraged Egyptians from studying the period. Western archaeologists tended to see the study of ancient Egypt as having nothing to do with modern Egypt; even the very term Egyptology refers to the study of pre-Roman Egypt, not modern Egypt. In the 19th century, various racial theories were devised to claim that the Egyptians were not the descendants of the ancient Egyptians, or alternatively, the history of ancient Egypt was a cycle of renewal caused by the conquests of racially superior invaders and decline caused by miscegenation with the racially inferior native population. The purpose of such theories was to assert the West was the "true heirs" of ancient Egypt, whose people were viewed as "honorary Westerners" with no connection to modern Egyptians. The effects of such efforts was to persuade many Egyptians that the pharaonic past was indeed not part of their heritage.

Moreover, since the Coptic language is descended from the ancient Egyptian language, starting in the 19th century a number of Copts have identified with Pharaonism as a way of emphasizing that they are "purer" Egyptians than the Muslim majority. For the purpose of building a national identity, an ideology that can be used to privilege a minority as being more authentic Egyptian than the majority presents problems, and generally, efforts to build an Egyptian national identity that embraces both Muslims and Copts have turned to the more recent periods of the past. Wood wrote that for the purposes of building national pride, "the Pharaonic past, for the Egyptian nationalist, was simply the wrong past."

== 2020s resurgence ==
A resurgence of Pharaonic depictions and discourse has been noted in today's Egypt, coming from both the state and the people.

The Egyptian government under president Abdel Fattah el-Sisi has openly embraced the ancient Egyptian aesthetic. In 2020, a 90-ton obelisk depicting the pharaoh Ramses II was erected in Tahrir Square. Throughout 2021, various extravagant parades were organized around the transportation of mummies and other artifacts to the Grand Egyptian Museum. Similar spectacles, including musical performances in the ancient Egyptian language, followed the opening of the Avenue of Sphinxes later that year. The First Lady Entissar Amer declared that she felt proud of "belonging to an ancient civilization".

In 2023, there was mass public anger in Egypt over the historically inaccurate depiction of Cleopatra as a black African in the Netflix docudrama series African Queens. The backlash was represented through the use of the hashtag "مصر_للمصريين" (Egypt for the Egyptians). Young Egyptians shared photos online depicting their own faces juxtaposed against those of kings, queens or everyday figures from ancient Egypt, intending to show the physical similarities between modern Egyptians and their ancient counterparts, asserting a national continuity.

The Egyptian government also commented on the controversy, with the Ministry of Tourism and Antiquities stating that the series represented a "falsification of Egyptian history." The Secretary General of the Supreme Council of Archeology through the Egyptian Ministry of Tourism and Antiquities released a statement on the issue, stating that Queen Cleopatra was "light-skinned and (had) Hellenic features."

== See also ==
- Coptic identity
- Egyptian Revolution of 1919
- Ethnic groups in Egypt
- Ethnic identity
- Kemetism
