= Youhanna Chiftichi =

Coptic priest and scholar

Youhanna Chiftichi was a Coptic priest and scholar in the 18th and 19th century, who taught Coptic to Jean-François Champollion, thus paving the way for the latter to decipher the Egyptian hieroglyphs. His name has been frequently misspelled as "Icaha Scheptichi" or "Jeacha Sceptidschy".

== Life ==
Youhanna Chiftichi was born in Cairo in the late 18th century. He worked for the French Army while in Egypt between 1799 and 1802. He moved to France in 1802 following Napoleon's failed conquest of Egypt. He first landed in Marseille then moved to Paris, and settled in Saint-Roch, where he was given permission to provide religious services to his Coptic countrymen who had also moved to France following Napoleon's conquest of Egypt. Chiftichi appears in some correspondences of the French government, who recruited him to assist with the encyclopedic Description de l'Egypte, due to his reputation as a scholar in Oriental languages.

== Influence on Champollion ==
While living in Saint-Roch, Chiftichi was visited by Jean-François Champollion. Chiftichi taught Cahmpollion the Coptic alphabet and Coptic language. Thanks to him, Champollion became fluent in Coptic. In one of his letters to his brothers, Champollion wrote about Chiftichi saying:

"I am going to visit a Coptic priest at Saint-Roch, rue Saint-Honoré, who celebrates Mass [...] who will instruct me in Coptic names, and the pronunciation of Coptic letters. I am devoting myself entirely to the Coptic language, for I want to know the Egyptian language as well as my own native French. My great work on the Egyptian papyri will be based on this [ancient] tongue."

In another letter to his brother, Champollion also wrote:

"My Coptic language is going well, I am very happy. Imagine my pleasure in speaking the language of my dear Amenhotep III, Seti, Ramses and Thutmose! [...] I will meet with a Coptic priest named Chiftichi at the Saint-Roch Church to learn more about Coptic names and letter pronunciation."

"I dream in Coptic. I do nothing but that, I dream only in Coptic, in Egyptian [...] I am so Coptic, that for fun, I translate into Coptic everything that comes into my head. I speak Coptic all alone to myself, since no one else can understand me. This is the real way for me to put my pure Egyptian into my head."

== Death ==
Youhanna Chiftichi died in France after 1825.

== See also ==
- Ancient Egyptian language
- Coptic language
- Coptic Legion
- Copts
- Egyptian hieroglyphs
- Jean-François Champollion
