= Bataillon des Chasseurs d'Orient =

Infantry battalion of the French Empire

- Active: 1802–1814
- Country: France
- Allegiance: (France) French Empire
- Branch: Imperial French Army
- Type: Light infantry
- Size: 221 (1804); 50 (1814)
- Engagements: Napoleonic Wars: War of the Third Coalition; Siege of Ragusa (1806)

Commanders
- Notable commanders: Nikolaos Papazoglou

The Bataillon des Chasseurs d'Orient was a light infantry battalion of the First French Empire formed in 1802 in Toulon. Consisting mainly of Greek and Copt veterans of the Armée d'Orient it was commanded by Colonel Nikolaos Papazoglou. Plagued by desertions it remained understrength and gradually became a multi-ethnic unit. Aside from its participation in the Siege of Ragusa (1806) and served mainly as a defense unit in Provence, French-ruled Dalmatia and the Ionian Islands. It was disbanded on 23 June 1814.

== Background ==
At the end of the 18th century, Ottoman Egypt was home to a small community of Egyptian Greeks who numbered from under a thousand to 5000 people. A small part of the community had entered the service of the Mamluks as mercenaries, their service was valued for their knowledge of artillery and maritime warfare. The much larger Copt minority also maintained good relations with the French, continuing their service as tax collectors after the beginning of French occupation. During the course of the War of the Second Coalition France occupied Egypt. On 3 August 1798, the French fleet was destroyed by the British in the Battle of the Nile. This defeat significantly complicated French military logistics which were already suffering from frequent Bedouin raids; while simultaneously creating a shortage of manpower. This resulted in the recruitment of Greek mercenaries who once served the Mamluks, such as Nikolaos Papazoglou who led unit of 100 men. The outbreak of the Revolt of Cairo, slowed down French recruitment among Muslim Egyptians, focus instead shifted to the region's Christian population.

The Copts were among the people targeted during the Revolt of Cairo for their alleged collaboration with the French. During the summer of 1800, Copt tax collector General Yaqub organized the 750 man strong Légion Cophte (Coptic Legion). The Coptic Legion policed the Christian quarters of Cairo, erected new fortifications in the city and took part in intelligence gathering. In April 1800, Papazoglou who had distinguished himself in the suppression of Mamluk revolts was promoted to chef de brigade. General Yaqub was promoted to the same rank in August 1800. On 27 June 1800, a regular army unit composed of ethnic Greeks was established under the name Légion Grecque (Greek Legion). Commanded by Papazoglou it numbered 577 officers and soldiers. On 21 March 1801 The Greek Legion suffered heavy casualties during the Battle of Alexandria. A number of Greek soldiers also refused to be evacuated to mainland France after the Capitulation of Alexandria in August. Less than half of the Coptic Legion boarded French ships, with their leader dying from an illness en route. General Yaqub was succeeded by his nephew Gabriel Sidarious.

== Service ==
The remnants of the Armée d'Orient arrived at Toulon on 11 October 1801. The Coptic and Greek Legions mustered a total of 479 soldiers and 57 officers. On 7 January 1802, the two legions were reorganized into the Bataillon des Chasseurs d'Orient a battalion of light infantry. Papazoglou was appointed its commander with the rank Colonel en chef, with Sidarious serving as his deputy. The unit also incorporated all auxiliary foreign personnel that had served in the Egyptian campaign, regardless of their religious background. A translator was attached to each company, attesting to their homogeneous nature. In March 1802, the unit numbered 386 soldiers and 59 officers. The following month 100 of them were deemed unfit for service and dispatched to a reserve unit. On 8 September, Napoleon Bonaparte approved the raising of the battalion's strength to 1,000 men to be recruited from veterans of the Armée d'Orient originating from the eastern Mediterranean. Those officers wishing to return to their homeland were allowed to resign.

From the unit's inception it was plagued by desertions, at the same time, recruitment was slow. In an effort to curtail desertions, its headquarters were moved from Marseille to Fort Joubert in Toulon. Since those wishing to escape often boarded merchant ships sailing abroad. An inspection conducted on 17 October 1804 revealed that it strength had fallen to 25 officers and 196 non-commissioned officer and soldiers. Morale was high, while the weapons handling, marching and discipline of the troops steadily improved. There existed however, a rivalry between the Greek and Coptic personnel of the battalion. The Chasseurs d'Orient remained on guard duty in Provence until 1806.

In February 1806, France invaded and occupied Dalmatia up to the Neretva River and later annexed the Republic of Ragusa as part of the hostilities of the War of the Third Coalition. This was followed by a Russian counter-offensive, on 17 June the Russians besieged the French garrison at Ragusa. In response, General Gabriel Jean Joseph Molitor hastily assembled a relief force of 1670 men which included the Chasseurs d'Orient who had been transferred to Dalmatia in spring. On 6 July, the relief force repulsed the Russians from Ragusa, lifting the siege. The Chasseurs d'Orient who formed the vanguard of the relief force distinguished themselves in the battle, and Molitor awarded four of the battalion's officers with the Legion of Honour. The battalion suffered one casualty as a result of the battle. At the time the unit was commanded by Gabriel Sidarious, due to Papazoglou's departure for the Ottoman Empire in an effort to recover his personal property.

In October 1806, Papazoglou returned to the unit from Constantinople. On 20 November 1806, its strength had fallen to 77 men due to continued desertions. In order to prevent the unit's dissolution Marmont ordered the recruitment of Orthodox inhabitants of the western Balkans. The new recruits came from diverse backgrounds and included Russians, Poles, Frenchmen, Serbo-Croatians (some of whom were deserters the Russian and Austrian armies). However Greeks and Copts continued to form the majority of the unit. Greek personnel from the battalion were periodically transferred to the French Navy due to their experience as sailors. The Chasseurs were stationed in Ragusa until March 1807, in April they were forwarded to Zara which they garrisoned until February 1808. By early 1808, the strength of the unit had risen to 148 men. In July, the unit moved to Kotor and a month later to Budva. In November 1808, the battalion relocated to Persagno where it remained until March 1809. The same month it briefly returned to Kotor before sailing for Corfu in April. The British Navy intercepted part of the French fleet during the transportation to Corfu capturing 20 members of the battalion.

In Corfu, the understrength battalion was temporarily attached to the Albanian Regiment. Due to Corfu's relative isolation, it was the last French garrison in Europe to surrender to the Coalition forces, on 23 June 1814. The Chasseurs were evacuated to Toulon along with the rest of the Corfu garrison between June and July. Upon his arrival in France, Papazoglou was informed of his forced retirement from active service. The remnants of the battalion (50 officers and soldiers) led by Sidarious were taken to Lyon where it was disbanded on 29 September 1814.

== Aftermath ==
All non French officers of the unit were ordered to relocate to the depot of Egyptian refugees in Marseille. Some of them were murdered by French royalists during the Second White Terror, while others including Sidarious were gradually reabsorbed into the French military.
