= International Coptic Union =

International Coptic Union (ICU)
- Founded: 2010
- Founder: Mr Kamal Abd El-Nour
- Type: International Organization
- Location: Vienna, Austria
- Region served: Worldwide
- Members: 27 Branches

The International Coptic Union (Acronym: ICU, Arabic:التجمع القبطى الدولي, German: Internationale Koptische Union, French: Union Internationale Copte) is an international organisation that aims to unify the Egyptian Coptic community around the world in order to resolve any conflict or hardship that may be faced by any Christian community, generally, or the Coptic community, specifically. The Union was officially registered in 2014 at the United Nations as a Non-Governmental Organisation.

== Establishment ==
The union was established in 2010 by Mr Kamal Abd El-Nour, the current chairman of the Union. In 2014 the Union was officially registered in the United Nations as an NGO.

== Objectives ==
- Establishing the foundations to unify of all Coptic Christian entities/individuals politically and socially;

- Cooperating with the other Coptic/Christian organisations to resolve any issues that may concern the Coptic/Christian general affairs around the world;

- Supporting the Coptic/Christian community politically and socially in each country around the world to ensure the equality rights, as citizens in their home communities.

- Communicating with all other political parties, entities or governments, internationally, in order to achieve the objectives of the union;

- Officially raising any issues and submitting memorandums in the United Nations regarding any general conflicts and concerns which may be suffered by any Christian community around the world.

- Upholding the religious values and the Egyptian Coptic identity;

- Promote gender equality and empower women;

- Develop global partnership for development;

- Eradicate extreme poverty and hunger.

== Headquarters and branches ==
The official headquarters office is in Vienna, Austria. The Union also has 27 branches around the world in the capital and major cities of many countries such as: Australia, Canada, Cyprus, Denmark, Egypt, Eswatini, Finland, France, Germany, Greece, Hungary, Italy, Netherlands, Russian Federation, Spain, Sweden, Switzerland, United Arab Emirates, United Kingdom and The United States of America.
As part of its activities, the Australian branch of the Union has created an Australian Public Company, Coptic International Union Ltd, to fulfill the Union's objectives on national basis according to its constitution. The Coptic International Union Ltd was registered as a charitable entity to operate in all Australian states and territories.
