= Coptic Legion =

French Army unit

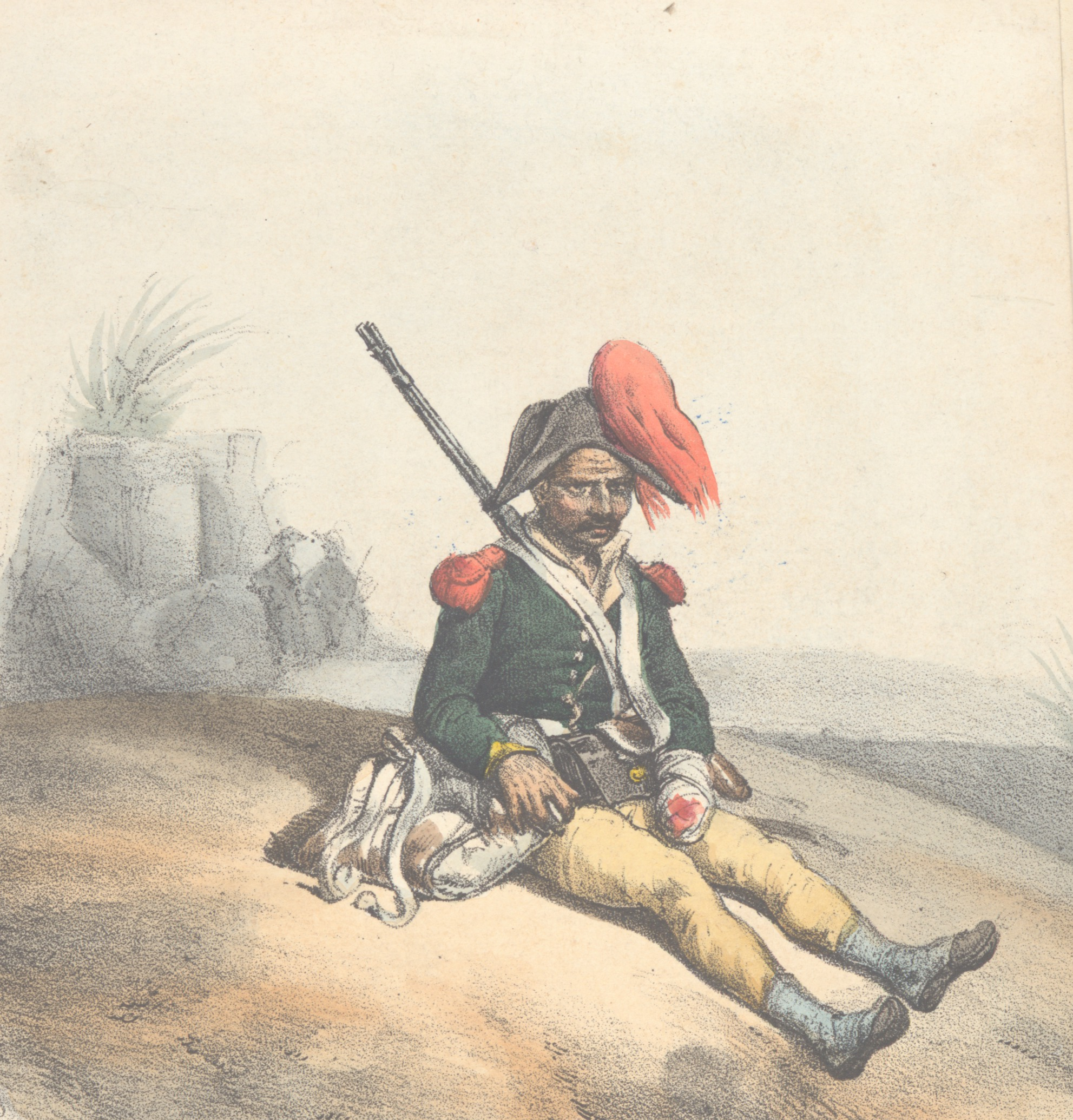
A soldier of the Coptic Legion.

The Coptic Legion (French: Légion Copte) was a military unit organized by the French Army during the Napoleonic conquest of Egypt. It was composed of ethnic native Egyptian Copts. It was the last local unit to be organized by Napoleon Bonaparte.

The Coptic Legion was formed out of the need of self-defense by the Coptic community against the Mamluks and Ottomans, since they were always persecuted and accused of complicity with their Christian European coreligionists. The Legion was headed by a Coptic general, Moallem Yaqub Hanna, based on a proposal by Jean-Baptiste Kléber in September 1799 to defend the Coptic community in Egypt. General Yaqub recruited young Copts from Cairo and Upper Egypt for the Legion. These were trained by officers from the French Army. The Coptic Legion consisted of 2 battalions each with 5 companies, and numbered 896 men, including officers, in 1800. However, some sources believe the number of recruited Copts in the Legion to have been as high as 2,000. Together with the Greek Legion, the Coptic Legion formed the Bataillon des Chasseurs d'Orient. The uniform of the Legion's soldiers was composed of a black hat, a green coat with red epaulettes, khaki trousers, and black boots.

The Légion Copte is thought to have been the best of all the locally organized units in Egypt. Many of its members also joined the ranks of the demi-brigades, in particular the 21st light demi-brigade. The Coptic Legion was particularly successful in protecting Coptic Christians in Egypt against Muslim aggression. When the population of Cairo revolted against the French during the 1798 Revolt of Cairo, and the Ottomans tried to retake Egypt, the Coptic Legion under General Yaqub barricaded themselves in the fortress with towers and ramparts they built at the neighborhood of Azbakeya and successfully defended Copts there during a 20-day siege, while Copts in other parts of Cairo were looted and murdered by Muslim mob led by Hasan Bey al-Jiddawi.

After the defeat of the Napoleonic conquest of Egypt at the hand of the British, the French troops were forced to withdraw from Egypt. Under articles 12 and 13 of the treaty signed between France and Great Britain, protection for those who had helped the French was guaranteed. Anyone who wished to leave for France was allowed to do so, and so many members of the Coptic Legion returned with the French army to France in 1801, including General Yaqub. Nonetheless, most of the members of the Coptic Legion chose to remain in Egypt, and were eventually murdered by the Ottomans. Those who reached France continued to fight in its army, several of them achieving high ranks.

The Coptic Legion was finally disbanded on 29 September 1814. The Egyptian writer Rifa'a at-Tahtawi recounts in his book Takhlis al-ibriz fi talkhis Bariz about encountering some of the former members of the Legion during his visit to Paris in 1826.

== See also ==
- Bataillon des Chasseurs d'Orient
- Copts
- Coptic identity
- Coptic nationalism
- Youhanna Chiftichi
