= Copts =

Ethnoreligious group in North Africa

ⲚⲓⲢⲉⲙ̀ⲛⲭⲏⲙⲓ ⲛ̀Ⲭⲣⲏⲥⲧⲓ̀ⲁⲛⲟⲥ
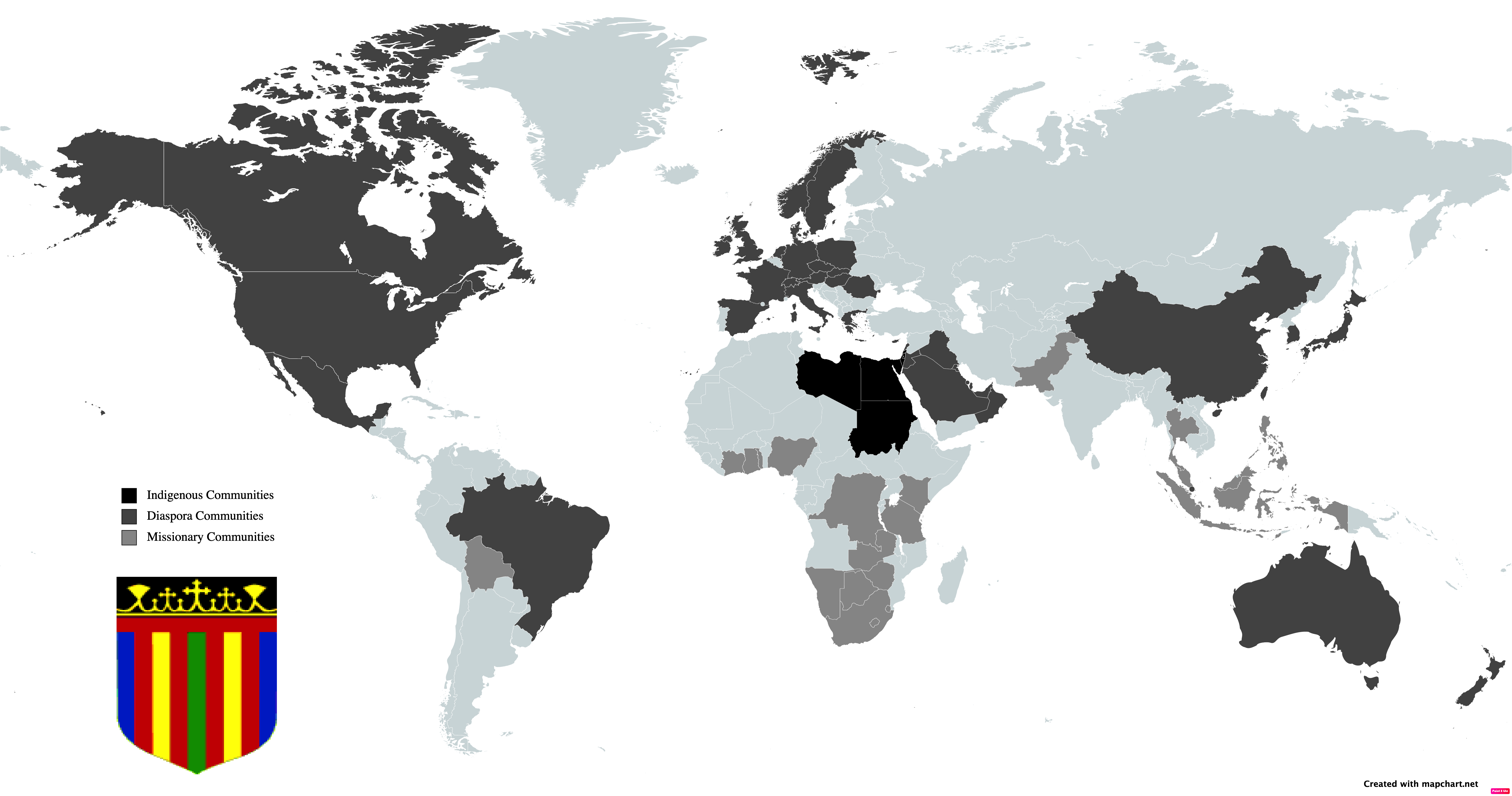
- Coptic diaspora

Regions with significant populations
- Egypt: 5 — 18 million (Note: In 2017, the Wall Street Journal reported that "the vast majority of Egypt's estimated 9.5 million Christians, approximately 10% of the country's population, are Orthodox Copts." In 2019, the Associated Press cited an estimate of 10 million Copts in Egypt. In 2015, the Wall Street Journal reported: "The Egyptian government estimates about 5 million Copts, but the Coptic Orthodox Church says 15–18 million. Reliable numbers are hard to find but estimates suggest they make up somewhere between 6% and 18% of the population." In 2004, BBC News reported that Copts were 5–10% of the Egyptian population. The CIA World Factbook reported a 2015 estimate that 10% of the Egyptian population is Christian (including both Copts and non-Copts). In 2017, the Minority Rights Group reported that figures for the population of Egyptian Copts "range between 4.7 and 7.1 million, comprising between six and nine per cent of the population, though some estimates put the proportion at as much as 15 to 10 per cent.")
- Diaspora: 1–2 million (estimates vary)
- United States: 500,000 (2018)
- Sudan: 400,000–500,000 (2008)
- Australia: 75,000 (2003)
- Libya: 60,000 (2016)
- Canada: 50,000 (2017)
- France: 45,000 (2017)
- Italy: 30,000 (2014)
- United Kingdom: 25,000–30,000 (2006)
- United Arab Emirates: 10,000
- Netherlands: 10,000

Languages
- Egyptian Arabic; Saʽidi Arabic; Literary Arabic; Coptic (liturgical and historical)

Religion
- Coptic Orthodox Church; Coptic Catholic Church; Coptic Protestant Churches

Copts (Coptic: ⲚⲓⲢⲉⲙ̀ⲛⲭⲏⲙⲓ ⲛ̀Ⲭⲣⲏⲥⲧⲓ̀ⲁⲛⲟⲥ, romanized: NiRemenkēmi enKhristianos; Arabic: أقباط, romanized: Aqbāṭ) are a Christian ethnoreligious group native to Egypt who have inhabited the area of modern Egypt since antiquity. They are, like the broader Egyptian population, (Note: See) descended from the ancient Egyptians. (Note: See) Copts predominantly follow the Coptic Orthodox Church, with a minority in the Coptic Catholic Church. They are the largest Christian population in Egypt and the Middle East, (Note: See) as well as in Sudan and Libya. Copts account for roughly 5 to 15 percent of the population of Egypt.

Originally referring to all Egyptians, the term Copt became synonymous with native Christians in light of Egypt's Islamization and Arabization after the Muslim conquest of Egypt in 639–646 AD. Copts have historically spoken the Coptic language, a direct descendant of the Demotic Egyptian that was spoken in late antiquity.

Following the Arab Muslim conquest of Egypt in the 7th century, the treatment of the Coptic Christians who did not convert ranged from relative tolerance to open persecution. Historically, the Copts suffered from waves of persecution giving way to relative tolerance in cycles that varied according to the local ruler and other political and economic circumstances. Themes of persecution and martyrdom constitute a significant part of Coptic identity due to historic and current conflicts.

Most Copts adhere to the Coptic Orthodox Church of Alexandria, an Oriental Orthodox Church. The smaller Coptic Catholic Church is an Eastern Catholic Church, in communion with the Holy See of Rome; others belong to the Evangelical Church of Egypt. Under Islamic rule, the Copts held important administrative and commercial positions. Copts also played an integral role in the Arab Renaissance (known as Al-Nahda). They contributed to Egypt's social and political life and key debates such as pan-Arabism, governance, educational reform, and democracy. They have historically flourished in business affairs.

While an integral part of broader Egyptian society and culture, Copts also preserve distinct religious traditions and some unique cultural elements. Coptic music is thought to incorporate some influences from earlier Egyptian musical traditions. Copts also maintain the use of the Coptic calendar, which is based on the ancient Egyptian calendar, and remains significant in their liturgical practices.

Many Copts view Arab identity as closely associated with Islam and may not fully identify with it, but they also have a national identity shared with other Egyptians. Copts and Muslim Egyptians are recognized as being physically indistinguishable. In urban cities of Egypt such as Cairo and Alexandria, Copts have a relatively high educational attainment, wealth index, and a strong representation in white-collar job types. Copts also face unique challenges, with most living in Upper Egypt—far from national core cities—working in blue collar jobs and having limited representation in the security agencies which dominate national politics. The majority of demographic, socio-economic, and health indicators are similar among Coptic Christians and Muslims in Egypt.

== Etymology ==
The English language adopted the word Copt in the 17th century from Neo-Latin Coptus, which derives from the Arabic collective Qubṭ/Qibṭ (قبط), with the demonym Qubṭī/Qibṭī (قبطى), plural Aqbāṭ (أقباط); another variation is Qufṭī/Qifṭī (where the Arabic /f/ reflects the historical Coptic /p/). These are Arabizations of the Coptic word ⲁⲓⲅⲩⲡⲧⲓⲟⲛ (aiguption), Bohairic for "Egyptian" or in relation to Egypt, or ⲕⲩⲡⲧⲁⲓⲟⲛ (kuptaion), in Sahidic. The Coptic word in turn represents an adaptation of the Greek term for the indigenous people of Egypt, Aigýptios (Αἰγύπτιος).

The Greek term for Egypt, Aígyptos (Ancient Greek: Αἴγυπτος), itself derives from the Egyptian language, but dates to a much earlier period, being attested already in Mycenaean Greek as a_{3}-ku-pi-ti-jo (lit. "Egyptian"; used here as a man's name). This Mycenaean form likely comes from Middle Egyptian ḥwt kꜣ ptḥ (reconstructed pronunciation: /ħawitˌkuʀpiˈtaħ/ → /ħajiʔˌkuʀpiˈtaħ/ → /ħəjˌkuʔpəˈtaħ/, Egyptological pronunciation Hut-ka-Ptah), literally meaning the "estate/palace of the kꜣ ("double" spirit) of Ptah" (compare Akkadian ^{ālu}ḫi-ku-up-ta-aḫ), the name of the temple complex of the god Ptah at Memphis (and a synecdoche for the city of Memphis and the region around it).

The term Aigýptios in Greek came to designate the native Egyptian population in Roman Egypt (as distinct from Greeks, Romans, Jews, etc.). After the Muslim conquest of Egypt (639–646), it became restricted to those Egyptians adhering to Christianity.

In their historic Coptic language, which represents the final stage of the Egyptian language, there is no distinct term equivalent to Copt as a designation separate from Egyptian. Instead, terms such as rem en kēme (in the Sahidic dialect) ⲣⲙⲛⲕⲏⲙⲉ, lem en kēmi (Fayyumic), and rem en khēmi (Bohairic) ⲣⲉⲙ̀ⲛⲭⲏⲙⲓ are attested, all of which literally mean "people of Egypt" or "Egyptians"; cf. Egyptian rmṯ n kmt, Demotic rmt n kmỉ. This is not unique to Coptic, as many community endonyms translate simply to "people", though it is understood that by saying "people", an in-group is being referred to. For example, the term Inuit means "the people", and the term Romani derives from words referring to "man" or "people". To an extent it was not necessary to make a distinction between "person of Egypt" as someone other than a Copt throughout much of history, as other groups residing in Egypt (such as the Greeks) had recognized ethnonyms in Coptic, such as "Hellene", that were sufficient. In the medieval era, there also was not always a distinction made between the Christian Copts and their pre-Christian ancestors, and the same ethnonym was sometimes used for both, which means that the identity to the culture of being "Coptic" was not as tightly tied to Christianity as it commonly is today (though it was still often placed as in opposition to being Muslim, usually by Muslims themselves, who ceased identifying a family as "Coptic" after the first generation of converts to Islam).

The Arabic word Qibṭ (Copt) has also been connected to the Greek name of the town of Kóptos (Koine Greek: Κόπτος, now Qifṭ; Coptic Kebt and Keft) in Upper Egypt. This association may have contributed to making "Copt" the settled form of the name.

In the 20th century, some Egyptian nationalists and intellectuals in the context of Pharaonism began using the term Qubṭ in the historical sense to refer to all Egyptians, both Christians and Muslims.

== History ==
=== Ptolemaic and Roman Egypt ===
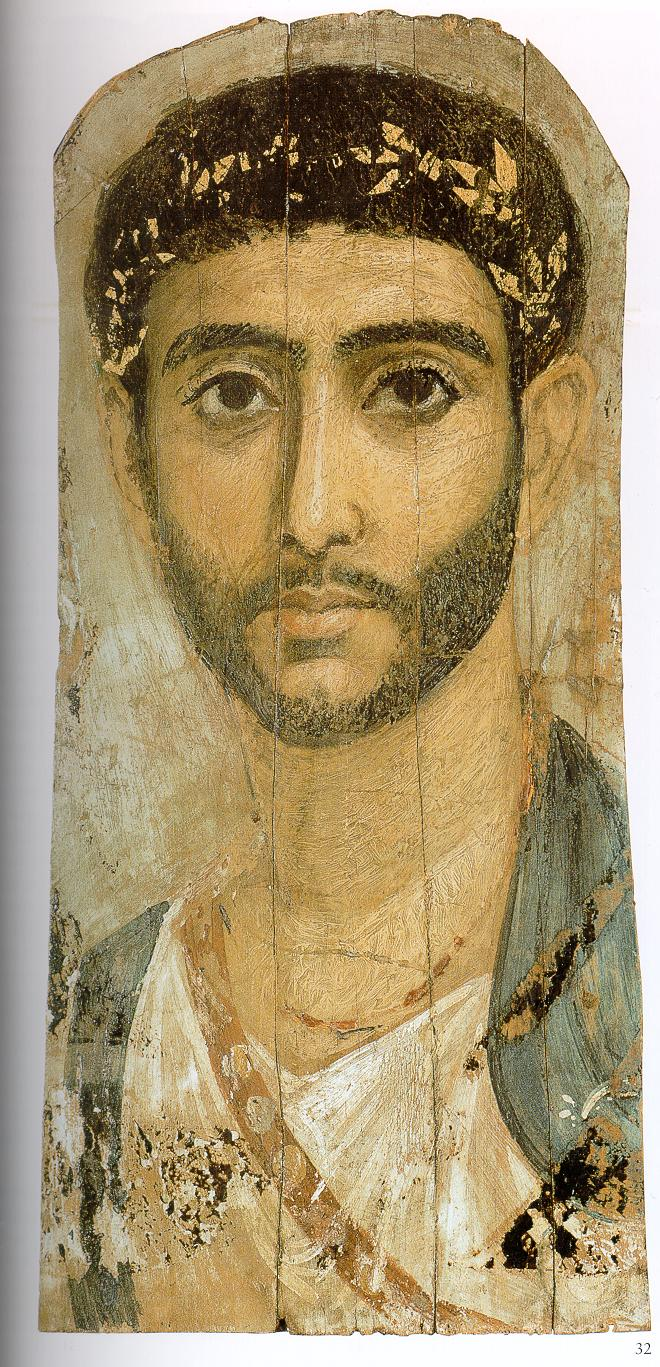
Faiyum mummy portrait of an Egyptian man with sword belt, Altes Museum

After the conquest of Egypt by Alexander the Great in 332 B.C., the country came under the rule of Greek Ptolemaic kings. While the majority of the population remained Egyptian, foreign settlers of both Greek and non-Greek origin immigrated to Egypt during that period. While 10% may stand as a very approximate figure for the total immigrant population in Ptolemaic Egypt, including both Greeks and non-Greeks, this figure has been challenged as excessive. The native Egyptian population, which remained Egyptian in language and culture, spoke the latest stage of the Egyptian language, which came to be known later as Coptic. The creation of Coptic as a coherent writing system to express the Egyptian language undoubtedly served to cement the distinction between the native population in Egypt and the ruling Greeks.

Despite the presence of these immigrants and a foreign pharaoh, Egypt remained home primarily to Egyptians, by far the largest group within the population. In fact, most of the rural and urban native population that lived in towns, villages and hamlets the length of the Nile Valley continued their lives little changed during the rule of the Ptolemies. Even in Alexandria, the capital of Ptolemaic Egypt and the largest Greek city outside of Greece, the number of native Egyptians far outnumbered that of Greeks. In numbers and in culture, Egypt remained essentially Egyptian, even as foreign communities were incorporated into the life of the country. Over time, the small numbers of foreigners were integrated into the Egyptian population so that, when Rome took control of Egypt in 30 BC, the vast majority of Greeks in Egypt were essentially categorized by the Roman conquerors as Egyptians.

The Faiyum mummy portraits reflect the complex synthesis of the predominant Egyptian culture and religion with that of Hellenistic art, and were attached to sarcophagi of firmly Egyptian character. The dental morphology of the Roman-period Faiyum mummies was compared with that of earlier Egyptian populations, and was found to be "much more closely akin" to that of ancient Egyptians than to Greeks or other European populations.

=== Foundation of the Christian Church in Egypt ===
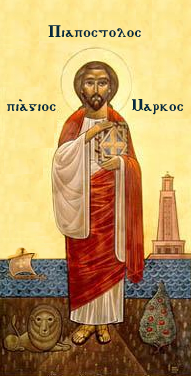
Coptic icon of St. Mark

According to sacred tradition, Christianity was introduced to present day Egypt by Mark the Evangelist in Alexandria, shortly after the ascension of Christ and during the reign of the Roman emperor Claudius around 42 AD. The legacy that Mark left in Egypt was a considerable Christian community in Alexandria, but within half a century of Mark's arrival, Christianity had spread throughout all of Egypt. This is clear from a fragment of the Gospel of John, written in Coptic and found in Upper Egypt that can be dated to the first half of the 2nd century, and the New Testament writings found in Oxyrhynchus in Middle Egypt, which date to around 200 AD. In the 2nd century, Christianity began to spread to the rural areas, and Scripture was translated into the Coptic language (then known simply as Egyptian). By the beginning of the 3rd century AD, Christians constituted the majority of Egypt's population, and the Church of Alexandria was recognized as one of Christendom's four apostolic sees. The Church of Alexandria is therefore the oldest Christian church in Africa.

=== Contributions to Christianity ===
The Copts in Egypt contributed immensely to the Christian tradition. The Catechetical School of Alexandria was the oldest institution of its kind in the world. Founded around 190 AD by the scholar Pantanaeus, the school became an important focus of religious learning, where students were taught by scholars such as Athenagoras, Clement, Didymus, and Origen (185–251, the father of theology, who was also active in the field of commentary and comparative Biblical studies). However, the scope of this school was not limited to theological subjects; science, mathematics, and humanities were also taught there. The question-and-answer method of commentary began there, and 15 centuries before Braille, blind scholars used wood-carving techniques there to read and write.

As major early adopters of Christianity, Copts have earned the reputation of missionaries spreading the Christian faith as far afield as Switzerland, Abyssinia, and India, and influencing Mesopotamia, Persia, Rome, and Ireland.

Another major contribution the Egyptian Copts made to Christianity was the creation and organization of monasticism. Worldwide Christian monasticism stems, either directly or indirectly, from Egyptian origins. Prominent figures of the early monastic movement in Egypt include Anthony the Great (251–356), Paul of Thebes (c. 227 – c. 341), Macarius the Great (c. 300 – 391), Shenouda the Archimandrite (d. 465), and Pachomius the Cenobite (d. 348). By the end of the 5th century, there were hundreds of monasteries and thousands of cells and caves scattered throughout the Egyptian desert. Pilgrims from all over the world visited the Egyptian Desert Fathers to emulate their spiritual, disciplined lives. Saint Jerome, who translated the Bible into Latin, came to Egypt while en route to Jerusalem around 400 AD, leaving details of his experiences in his letters. St. Benedict founded the Benedictine Order in the 6th century on the model of Saint Pachomius, though in a stricter form.

=== Ecumenical councils ===
The major contributions that the See of Alexandria has contributed to the establishment of early Christian theology and dogma are attested to by fact that the first three ecumenical councils in the history of Christianity were headed by Egyptian patriarchs. The Council of Nicaea (325 AD) was presided over by Pope Alexander I of Alexandria, along with Saint Hosius of Córdoba. In addition, the most prominent figure of the council was the future Patriarch of Alexandria Athanasius, who played the major role in the formulation of the Nicene Creed recited today in most Christian churches of different denominations. One of the council's decisions was to entrust the Patriarch of Alexandria with calculating and annually announcing the exact date of Easter to the rest of the Christian churches. The Council of Constantinople (381 AD) was presided over by Pope Timothy I of Alexandria, while the Council of Ephesus (431 AD) was presided over by Pope Cyril of Alexandria.

=== Council of Chalcedon ===
In the fourth and fifth centuries AD, the foundations were laid for the divergence in doctrine between the native Christian Church of the Egyptians and that of the empire. The official schism occurred at the Council of Chalcedon in 451 AD. The council, which condemned, deposed, exiled and replaced the native Egyptian patriarch of Alexandria Dioscorus I, was rejected by the Egyptian delegation to the council, and by extension by the entirety of the native Egyptian population. As a result of the Council of Chalcedon, the Church of Alexandria, which had jurisdiction over the entire country of Egypt, as well as all of continent of Africa, was divided into a church that accepted the decrees of the council, and one that rejected them. The church that accepted the council, became known as the Chalcedonian church, and survives today as the Greek Orthodox Patriarchate of Alexandria. On the other hand, the church that rejected the council of Chalcedon, to whom the vast majority of the native Copts adhered, became the predecessor of the Coptic Orthodox Church. The latter has been erroneously referred to as Monophysite, although it itself rejects that term and self-proclaims to be Miaphysite. The non-Chalcedonian Miaphysite doctrine became adopted as a badge of nationalism for the native Egyptians.

=== Byzantine Egypt ===
A distinctive Egyptian character of Egypt's native Copts began to develop after the council of Chalcedon, and reached its zenith in the period after the reign of emperor Justinian I in the sixth century AD. That process became the foundation for the evolution of a distinctive Egyptian character for the Coptic Orthodox Church, with its distancing from the empire's official Chalcedonian Christology and its distinctive Greek character. During that period and until the Arab invasion of Egypt in the seventh century, the Byzantine emperors repeatedly deposed and exiled native Egyptian non-Chalcedonian patriarchs of Alexandria, and imposed pro-Chalcedonian ones, most of whom were non-Egyptian. Over the years, because of what they had construed as persecution of the imperial authorities, the Egyptians hardened their position and rejected all conciliatory efforts that fell short of a full condemnation of the Council of Chalcedon. This position coincided with the rise in the public visibility of the Coptic language in several areas of the Egyptians' daily life.

=== Arab conquest of Egypt ===
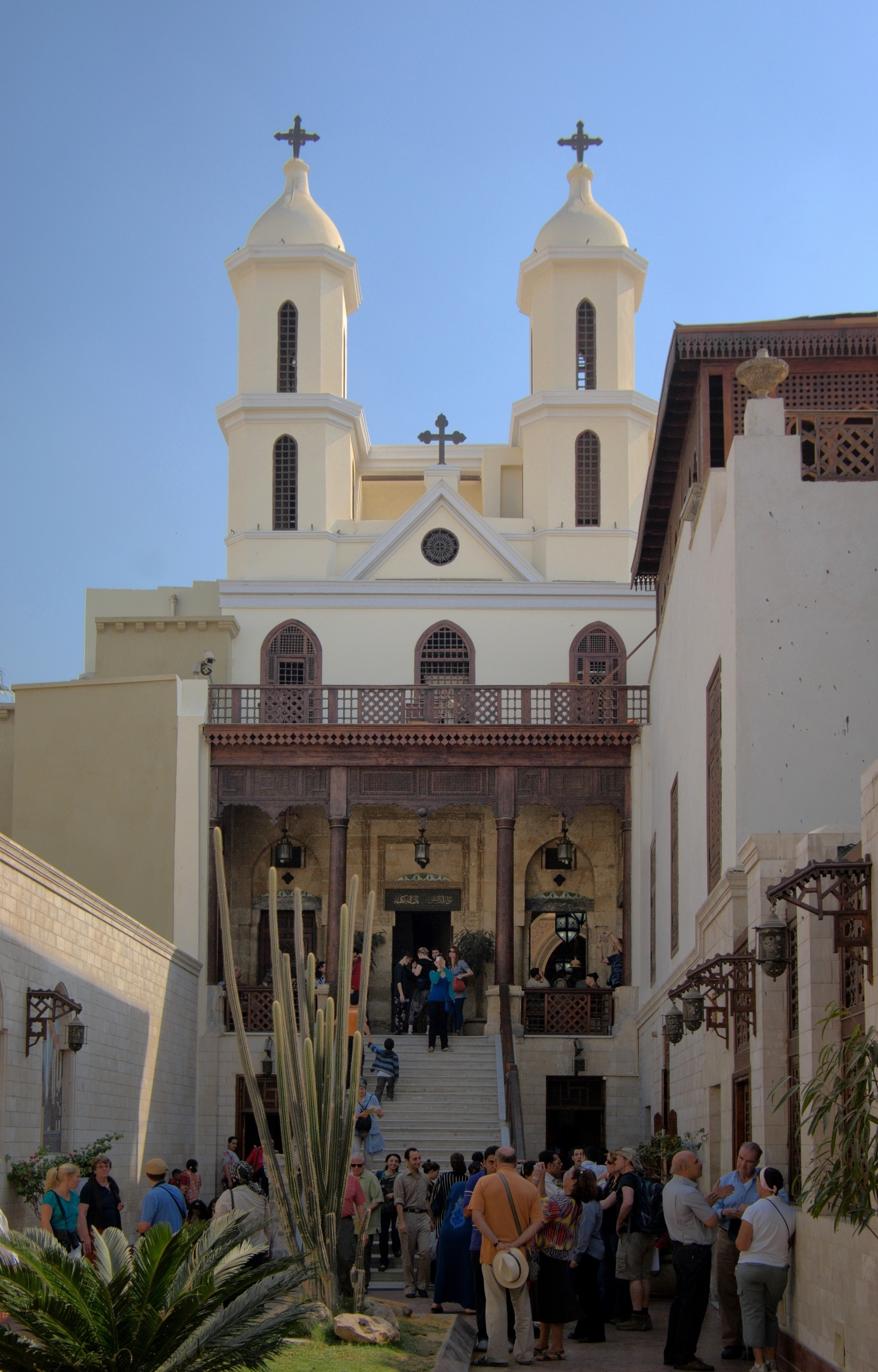
The Hanging Church in Coptic Cairo

In 641 AD, Egypt was conquered by Arab Muslim forces following the defeat of the Byzantine army. According to historian Roger S. Bagnall, the Copts who had developed a distinct Egyptian and non-Chalcedonian identity were subjected to a new system of governance that prioritized fiscal exploitation and systematic resource extraction, particularly through taxation.

Alfred J. Butler records that parts of Alexandria were damaged during the Arab entry into the city, including the destruction of some of its walls and the burning of several churches.

During the early years of the Rashidun Caliphate, Egypt's population, particularly the native Copts, was subjected to the imposition of new forms of taxation, forced labor requisitions for state infrastructure, and the appropriation of agricultural and technical resources. The fertile Nile Valley and the country's skilled labor force, particularly in shipbuilding and irrigation, were of strategic importance to the new administration.

By the early eighth century, Coptic Christians were increasingly compelled to participate in state-sponsored labor. According to Alfred J. Butler, entire Egyptian villages were required to supply annual quotas of workers for construction projects, including palaces and mosques in Fustat, Damascus, and Jerusalem. Additionally, they were conscripted into naval expeditions considered especially harsh, as those sent rarely returned to their villages due to the dangerous conditions.

Roger S. Bagnall emphasizes that fiscal exploitation and labor requisition were central elements of the early Islamic administrative system in Egypt. These policies imposed disproportionate burdens on rural communities, particularly the Copts, who bore the brunt of extractive practices aimed at funding the caliphate's military and infrastructural expansion.

In addition to labor, native Christians were subject to the jizya, a special tax levied exclusively on non-Muslims under Islamic law. Aziz Suryal Atiya notes that during the Umayyad period, this tax was extended even to monks, in violation of earlier pledges of exemption, and was often enforced with harsh penalties.

Faced with the cumulative pressures of taxation, legal inequality, and the threat of forced conscription or persecution, many Copts gradually converted to Islam. These converts were classified as Mawali (non-Arab Muslims) who, while integrated into the Muslim community, initially occupied a lower social and legal status than Arab Muslims.

The burden of taxation left many Copts in rural areas unable to meet their obligations. Oppressive taxation resulted in local resistance and many revolts by the Copts against the Arab occupiers, the most famous of which were the Bashmurian revolts between 720 A.D. and 832 A.D. Another reaction to the heavy taxation was for poor Christian Copts to either borrow money from richer members of their communities, or to altogether flee their lands and escape to other parts of Egypt.

=== Middle Ages ===
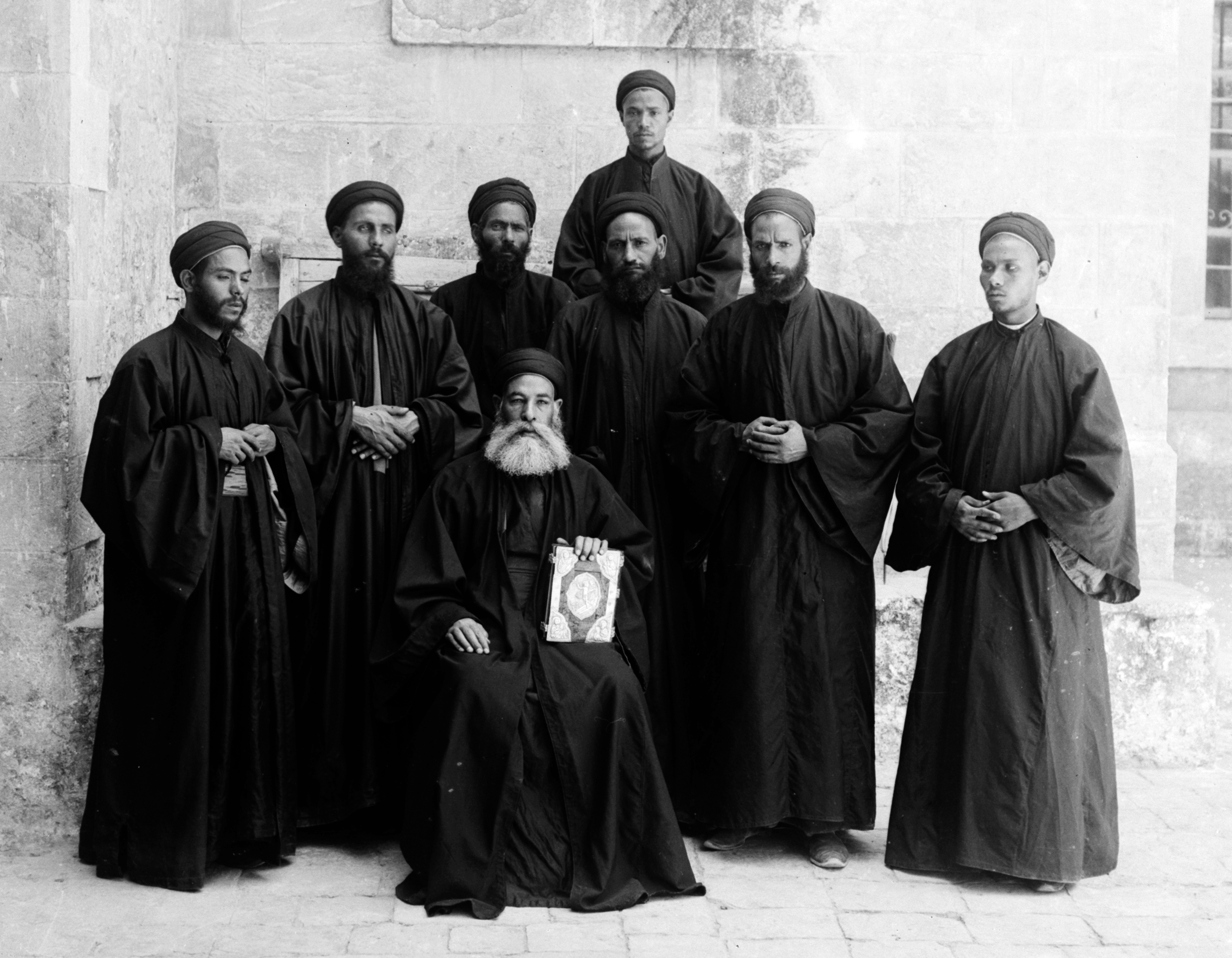
Egyptian Coptic monks at the American Colony, Jerusalem, between 1898 and 1914

Despite the political upheaval, Egypt remained mainly Christian for approximately 800 years. Coptic Christians lost their majority status after the 14th century as a result of successive persecutions and the destruction of the Christian churches in Egypt. From the Muslim conquest of Egypt onwards, the Coptic Christians were persecuted by different Muslim regimes, such as the Umayyad Caliphate, the Abbasid Caliphate, the Fatimid Caliphate, the Mamluk Sultanate, and the Ottoman Empire. The persecution of Coptic Christians included closing and demolishing churches, forced conversions to Islam, and heavy Jizya taxation for those who refused to convert.

Coptic converts to Islam may have been motivated by the prospect of financial relief as they would no longer be subject to the Jizya tax, which was levied only on non-Muslims according to Islamic Sharia law. The History of the Patriarchs of Alexandria recounts the history of fiscal oppression imposed by the caliphate against Copts as driving conversions from Christianity to Islam. Early converts had to attach themselves to Arab Muslim patrons as Mawali. While they had to adopt Arabic as their main language, they remained fluent in Coptic, thus creating a growing bilingual group among Egyptian Muslims. Nevertheless, Egypt remained a majority Christian country well into the Middle Ages. Many cities in Upper Egypt had no Muslim communities at all during that time.

=== Early modern period ===
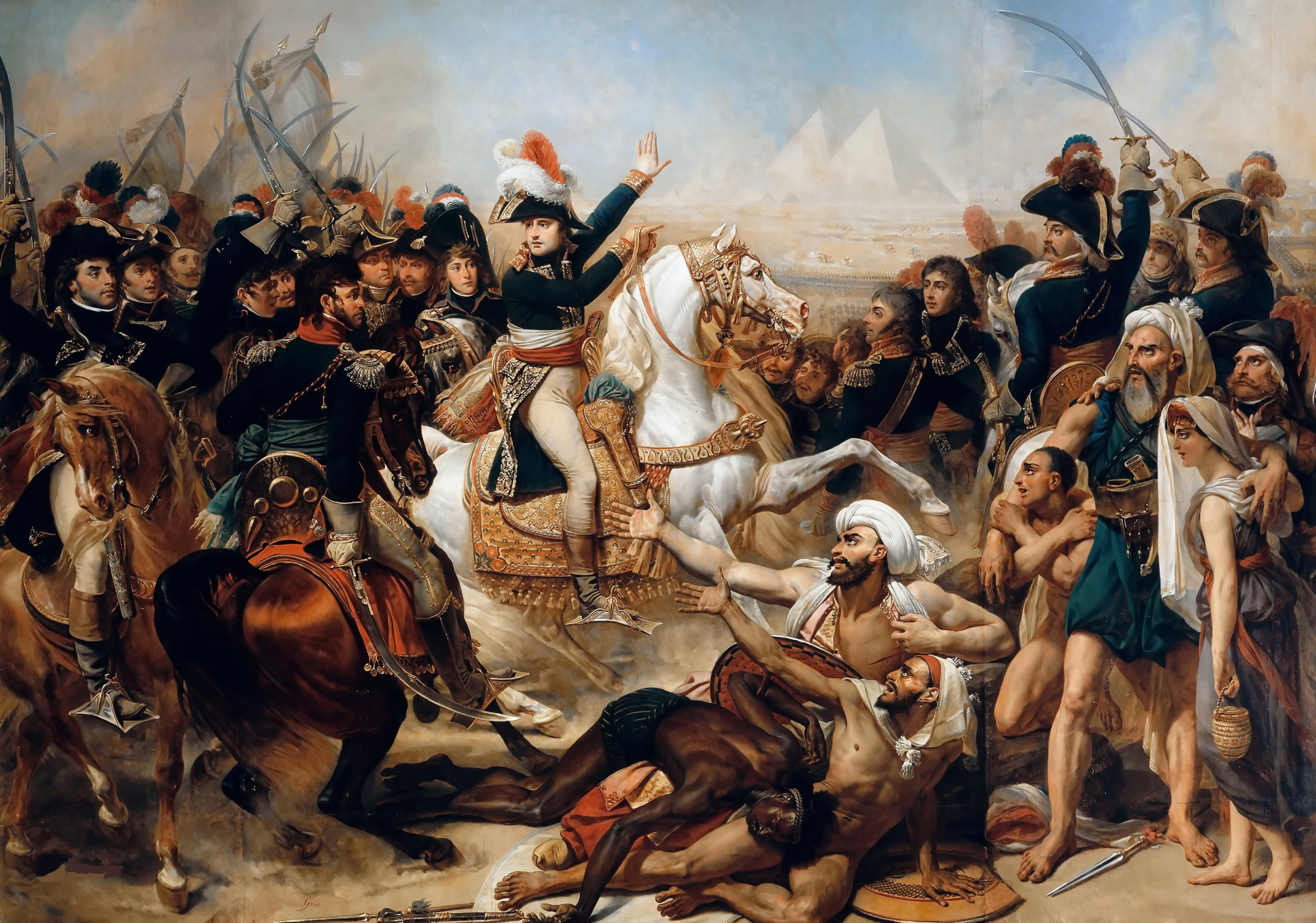
Napoleon at the Pyramids in 1798, by Antoine-Jean Gros

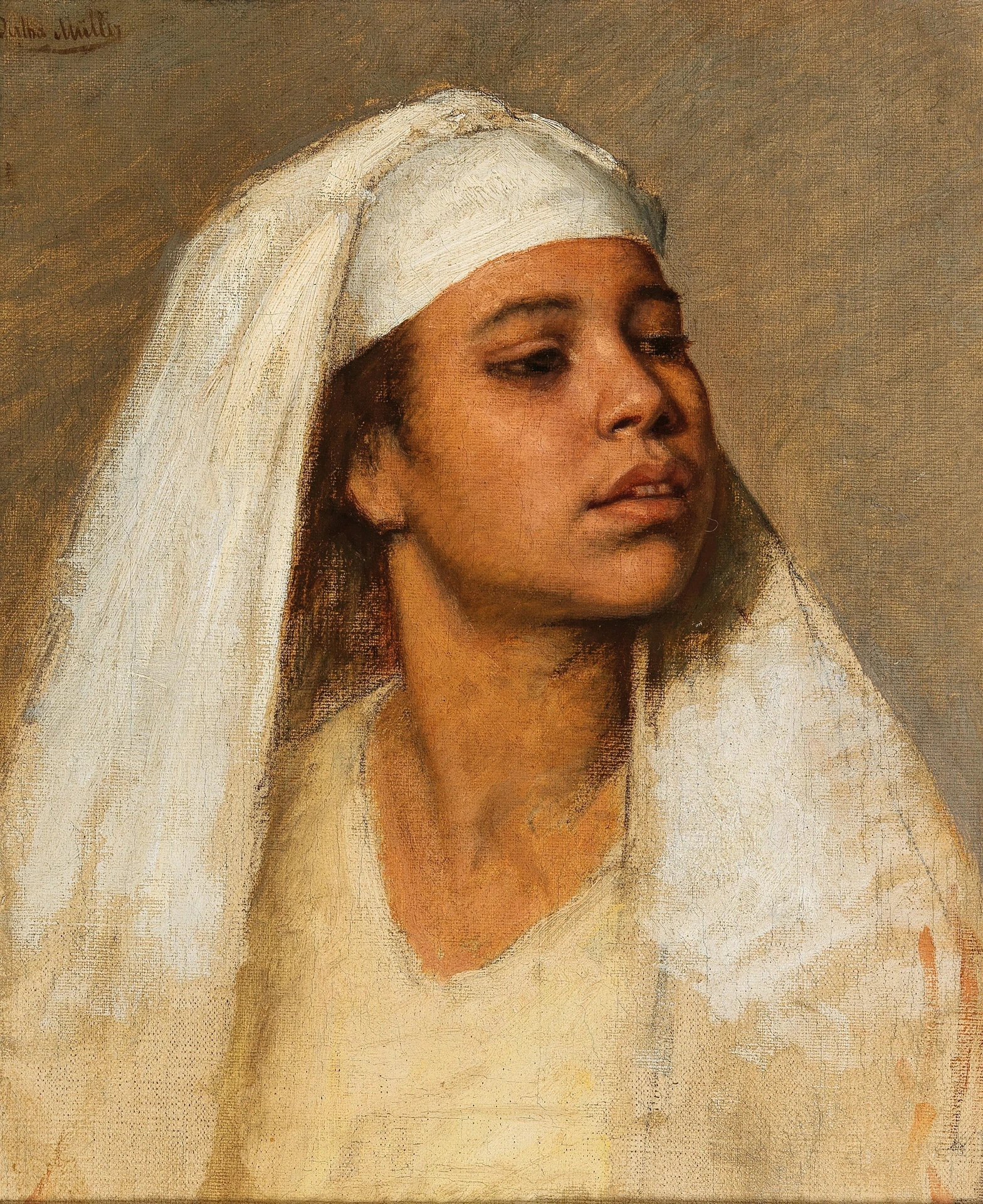
Portrait of a Coptic Christian woman by Bertha Müller, circa 1850

The treatment of Christian Copts by Muslim rulers remained challenging throughout the Middle Ages and continued into the early modern period. When Napoleon conquered Egypt in 1798 as part of the Napoleonic wars, a military unit known as the Coptic Legion was created out of necessity for self-defense by the Coptic community for protection against the Mamluks, Ottomans, and Egyptian Muslims. The Coptic Legion was headed by a Coptic general, General Yaqub, who recruited young Copts from Cairo and Upper Egypt for the legion. These were trained by instructors from the French army. Together with the Greek Legion, the Coptic Legion formed the Bataillon des Chasseurs d'Orient. Members of the Coptic Legion returned with the French army to France in 1801 after the defeat of the Napoleonic conquest of Egypt.

General Yaqub is considered to be the founder of the first project for Egypt's independence in modern times from the Ottoman Empire. He argued for the country's independence from an Egyptian nationalist point of view, highlighting the past glory of Egypt, lamenting its current state unworthy of a people who built a great civilization, and stressing the debt that humanity owes to Egypt's ancient culture.

During the Ottoman period, Copts were classified alongside other Oriental Orthodox (namely the Syriac Orthodox) and Church of the East peoples under the Armenian millet. Under Muslim rule, Christians paid special taxes, had lower access to political power, and were exempt from military service.

The position of the Copts improved dramatically under the rule of Muhammad Ali in the early 19th century. He abolished the jizya (a tax on non-Muslims) and allowed Copts to enroll in the army. Pope Cyril IV, who reigned from 1854 to 1861, reformed the church and encouraged broader Coptic participation in Egyptian affairs. Khedive Isma'il Pasha, in power 1863–1879, further promoted the Copts. He appointed them judges to Egyptian courts and awarded them political rights and representation in government. They flourished in business affairs.

=== Copts in modern Egypt ===
The flag of Egyptian nationalist revolutionaries during the 1919 Revolution. It displays both the crescent representing Muslim Egyptians and the cross representing Christian Egyptians

Egypt's struggle for independence from both the Ottoman Empire and the United Kingdom was marked by secular Egyptian nationalism. Copts were in the forefront of that struggle for Egypt's independence. When the Egyptian nationalist leader Saad Zaghlul met the Arab delegates at Versailles in 1919, he insisted that their struggles for statehood were not connected, stressing that the problem of Egypt was an Egyptian problem and not an Arab one.

When Zaghlul was exiled by the British to Malta in 1919, a number of prominent Coptic figures who joined him in resisting the British occupation of Egypt were also exiled with him, including Wissa Wassef and George Khayat, both key members of the Egyptian nationalist movement. When Zaghlul returned from his first exile, he was joined by the Copts Wissa Wassef, Sinout Hanna, Wassef Ghali, Morcos Hanna, and Makram Ebeid in forming a strong opposition against British colonialism in Egypt. Later in 1921, when Zaghlul was exiled to the Seychelles, Makram Ebeid was exiled with him.

The exiles were part of the larger Egyptian nationalist response to British colonial rule and represented a unified effort across religious lines in Egypt. They galvanized widespread protests in Egypt that culminated in the famous 1919 revolution, which further emphasized the shared desire for independence among Egyptians of all faiths. This unity became a hallmark of the early 20th-century Egyptian nationalism. In his memoirs, Fakhri 'Abd al-Nur, one of the most recognized Coptic figures of the 1919 Revolution, recalls the positive impact of the statement made by Saad Zaghlul at the onset of the revolution, declaring "equal responsibilities and equal rights" of Egyptian Copts and Muslims. In fact, the preacher of the 1919 Revolution was a Coptic priest, Father Morcos Sergius, who had been previously exiled by the British in 1915.

In April 1922, the British ordered the execution of seven Egyptian nationalists, four of whom were Copts: Wissa Wassef, Wassef Ghali, George Khayat, and Morcos Hanna. As a result of their struggle, Egypt gained its independence from both Great Britain and the Ottoman Empire on 28 February 1922. This struggle of Copts against the British and the Ottomans within the framework of Egyptian nationalism highlighted the Copts' (as well as the Egyptian Muslims') self-identification as Egyptians first and foremost with little attention to religious affiliations.

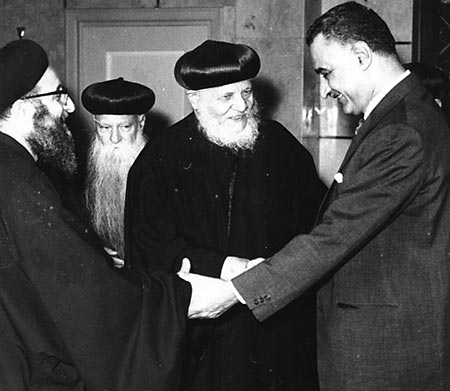
President Nasser welcomes a delegation of Coptic bishops (1965)

Significant cultural achievements for Copts during this era include the founding of the Coptic Museum in 1910 and the Higher Institute of Coptic Studies in 1954. Prominent Coptic thinkers from this period are Salama Moussa, Louis Awad and Secretary General of the Wafd Party Makram Ebeid.

In 1952, Gamal Abdel Nasser led a clique of army officers in a coup d'état against King Farouk, which overthrew the monarchy and declared Egypt a republic. Nasser was a secularist whose ideology was rooted in pan-Arab nationalism and socialism. The Copts were severely affected by Nasser's nationalization programs and his pan-Arab policies undermined the Copts' strong attachment to and sense of identity about their Egyptian pre-Arab identity.

== Demographics ==
The Coptic population in Egypt is difficult to estimate because researchers are forbidden by Egyptian authorities to ask a survey participant's religion. A lack of definite, reliable demographic data renders all estimates uncertain. As of 2019, Copts were generally understood to make up approximately 10 percent of Egypt's population, with an estimated population of 9.5 million (figure cited in the Wall Street Journal, 2017) or 10 million (figure cited in the Associated Press, 2019). Smaller or larger figures have also been cited, in the range of "somewhere between 6% and 18% of the population," with the Egyptian government estimating lower numbers and the Coptic Orthodox Church estimating higher numbers. In 2023, Pope Tawadros II of Alexandria stated that the number of Copts in Egypt is estimated at 15 million out of a total population of 105 million, or approximately 14% of the population in Egypt. He also said there were another 2 million Copts living in approximately 100 different countries in the diaspora. He explained that this data was obtained from records of child baptisms, marriages, and deaths.

Despite challenges, Copts are well-integrated in Egyptian society. The highest concentrations of Copts are in Upper Egypt, especially around Asyut, Minya, Sohag and Qena, along with some districts in major cities of Cairo and Alexandria.

=== Diaspora ===
There are approximately 1-2 million Copts living outside of Egypt, and are known as the Coptic diaspora. They live mainly in the United States (500,000), Sudan (400,000–500,000), Australia (75,000), Libya (60,000), Canada (50,000), France (45,000), Italy (30,000), the United Kingdom (25,000–30,000), the United Arab Emirates (10,000), and the Netherlands (10,000).

==== Sudan ====
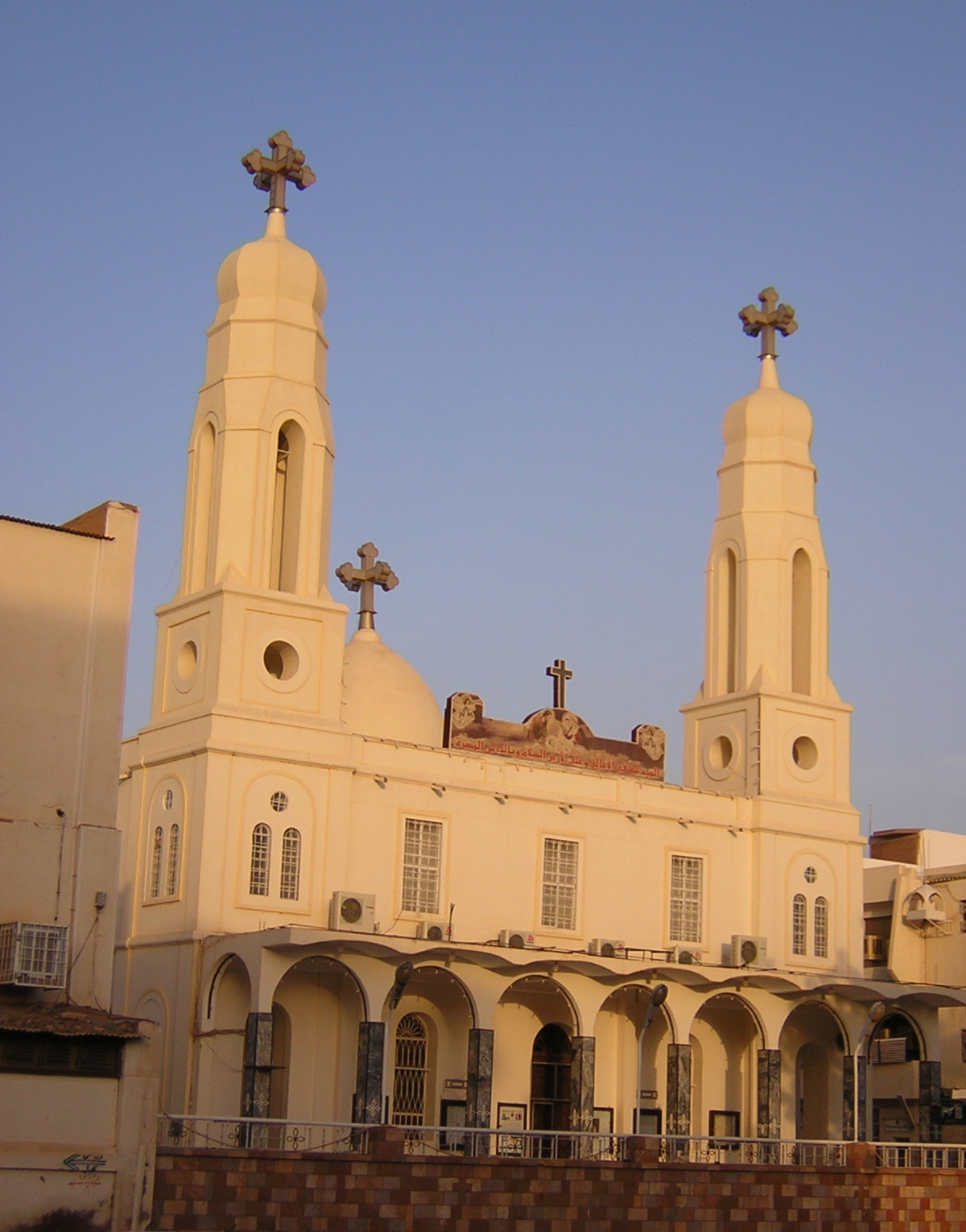
Holy Virgin Mary Coptic Orthodox Cathedral in Khartoum

Sudan has a native Coptic minority, although many Copts in Sudan are descended from more recent Egyptian immigrants. Copts in Sudan live mostly in northern cities close to the border with Egypt. Many Sudanese Copts have advanced educations. They have occasionally faced forced conversion to Islam, resulting in their emigration and decrease in number.

Modern immigration of Copts to Sudan peaked in the early 19th century, and they generally received a tolerant welcome there. However, this was interrupted by a decade of persecution under Mahdist rule at the end of the 19th century. As a result of this persecution, many were forced to relinquish their faith, adopt Islam, and intermarry with the native Sudanese population. The Anglo-Egyptian invasion in 1898 allowed Copts greater religious and economic freedom. However, the return of Islamism in the mid-1960s and subsequent demands by radicals for an Islamic constitution prompted Copts to join in public opposition to religious rule.

Introduction of Islamic Sharia law in 1983 began a new phase of oppressive treatment of Copts, among other non-Muslims. Coptic leaders supported a secular candidate in the 1986 elections. However, when the National Islamic Front overthrew the elected government with the help of the military, discrimination against Copts returned in earnest. Hundreds of Copts were dismissed from the civil service and judiciary. In 1991, many Copts in Sudan fled the country after the execution by the government of a Coptic pilot for illegal possession of foreign currency and refusing to convert to Islam. Restrictions on the Copts' rights to Sudanese nationality followed, and it became difficult for them to obtain Sudanese nationality by birth or by naturalization, resulting in problems when attempting to travel abroad. The confiscation of Christian schools and the imposition of an Arab-Islamic emphasis in language and history teaching were accompanied by harassment of Christian children and the introduction of hijab dress laws. In contrast with the extensive media broadcasting of the Muslim Friday prayers, the radio ceased coverage of the Christian Sunday service.

After the 2018 Sudanese revolution, one Copt (Raja Nicola Issa Abdul-Masseh) was appointed in 2019 to the 11-member Transitional Sovereignty Council, which was convened as part of plan to transition Sudan to democracy. However, a military coup in 2019 dissolved the council and halted the democratic transition. Christians, including Copts, were subjected to intensified persecution during the civil war that began in 2023. Many became refugees or were internally displaced.

A 2018 report by the Minority Rights Group said Sudanese Copts had previously estimated their numbers at 400,000 to 500,000, about 1% of the Sudanese population, but that emigration and conversion (including forced conversion) to Islam had decreased their number further.

==== Libya ====
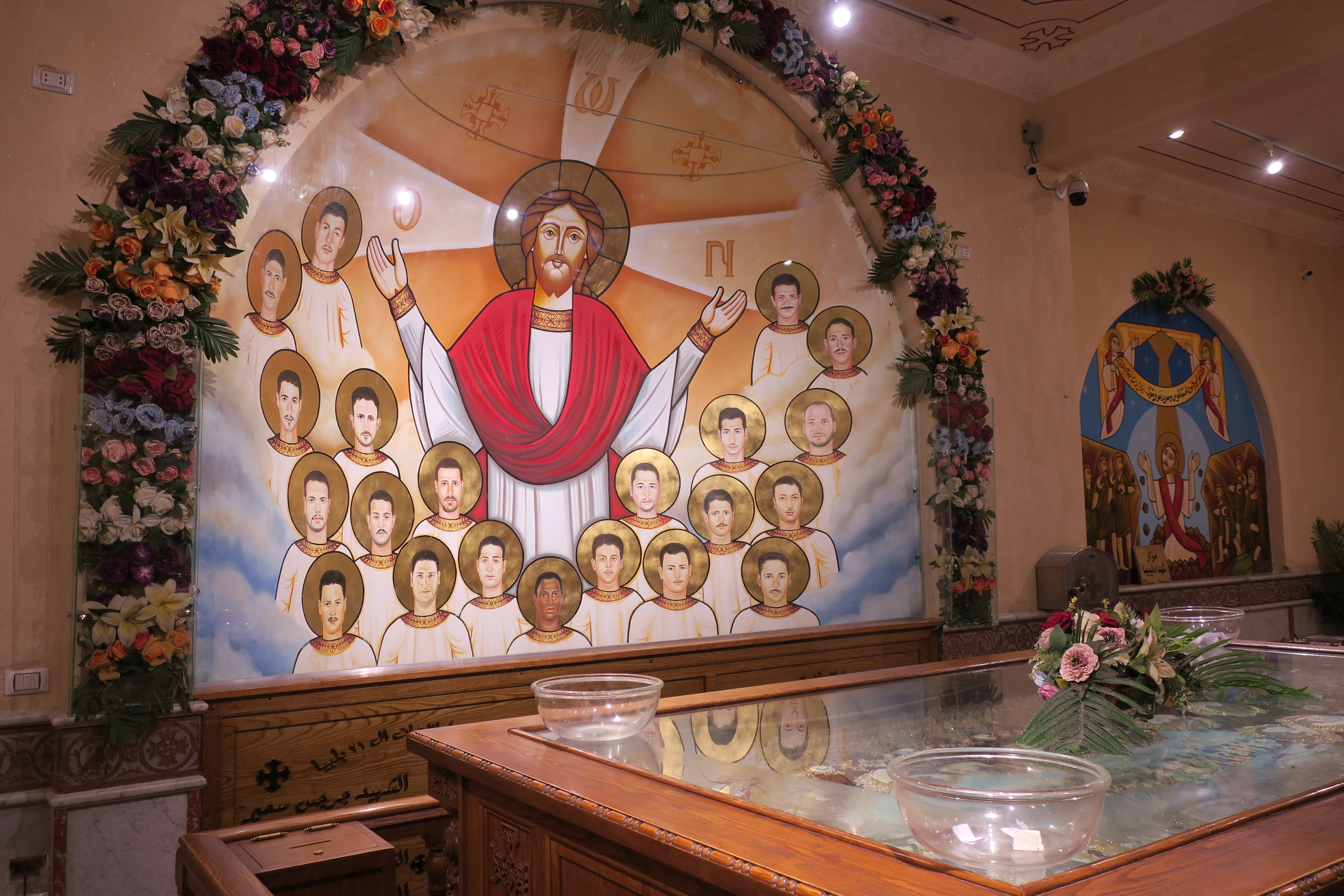
Coptic icon of the 21 Coptic martyrs of Libya

The Coptic population in Libya is uncertain. A 2013 estimate by the U.S. Department of State placed the entire population of non-Muslim Libyans at 180,000 (roughly 3% of the country's population). However, the Coptic Orthodox Church in Libya estimated that its membership alone was 300,000, including those who do not regularly attend church services. In 2011, there were three Coptic churches in the country. From 2011 to 2015, during the Libyan civil war, at least 200,000 Christians fled Libya. during that time, Islamist militants such as the Ansar al-Sharia, Nusra Front, and Islamic State violently persecuted Copts.

In 2015, twenty Copts were killed by beheading in Libya by the Islamic State. The video of their execution, which was broadcast by Al-Hayat gained widespread international attention, leading to their canonization by both the Coptic Orthodox Church and the Catholic Church.

==== North America ====
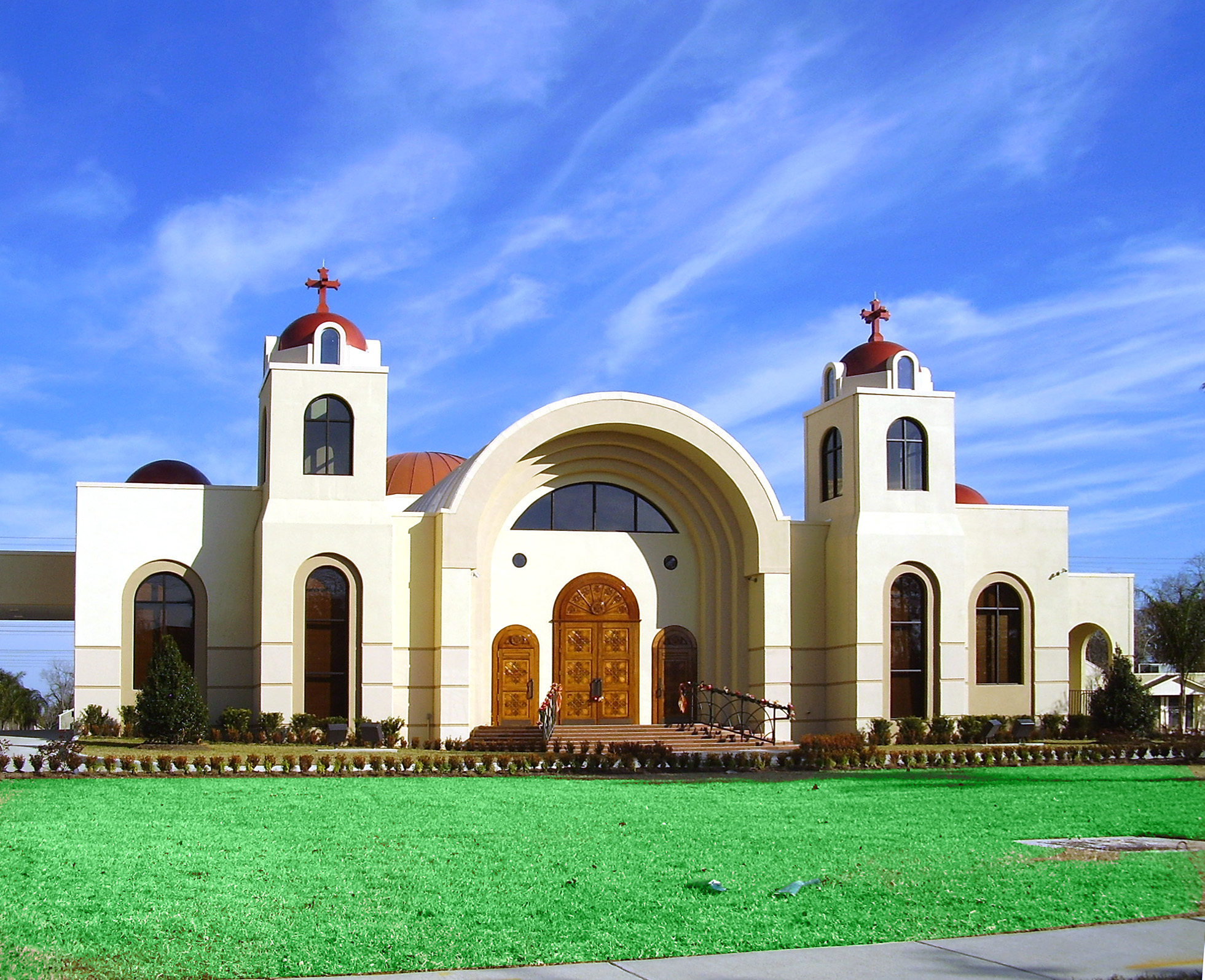
St. Mark Coptic Orthodox Church in Bellaire, Texas (Greater Houston)

The largest Coptic diaspora population outside of Egypt is located in North America, both in the United States and Canada.

The first Coptic Orthodox church in North America, Saint Mark Coptic Orthodox Church, was built in Toronto in 1964. The first Coptic Orthodox church in the United States, Saint Mark Coptic Orthodox Church in New Jersey, was built in Jersey City, New Jersey shortly afterward.

As of 2018, the American Coptic population was estimated to be more than 500,000, with more than 250 Coptic churches in the United States at the time. In the early 2010s, the Canadian Coptic Association estimates that the population of Canadian Copts was 35,000. By 2017, there were an estimated 50,000 Canadian Copts, with more than 80% living in Ontario, mainly in the Greater Toronto Area.

==== Australia ====
The Coptic Australians population has been estimated at 30,000 (ABC News, 2017) to 100,000 (SBS, 2018). The first Coptic Orthodox priest in Australia arrived in 1969. The Coptic Orthodox Church in Australia is organized into two dioceses, the first based in Melbourne (diocese organized in 1999) and the second in Sydney (diocese organized in 2002). There is a single Coptic Catholic church in Australia, consecrated in 2019.

==== Middle East ====
Smaller communities of Copts are found throughout the Middle East outside Egypt, including Kuwait, Jordan, and Lebanon.

Jordan has a minor community of Copts. In 2005, the Virgin Mary Coptic Orthodox Church in the Abdali district of Amman had 8,000 members, mostly Egyptians.

As of 2012, Lebanon's Syriac League estimated that the Coptic population in the country numbered at 3,000 to 4,000.

In Israel, there were approximately 1,000 Copts as of 2014, mostly residing in Jerusalem.

==== Europe ====
In Europe, France has the largest number of Copts, estimated at 45,000. This is followed by Italy (30,000), the United Kingdom (25,000–30,000) and the Netherlands (10,000).

As of 2017, Germany was home to between 6,000 and 10,000 Copts. In the 2020s, the Coptic Orthodox population of Austria was estimated to be 10,000, although the 2001 Austrian census (the country's last to record religious affiliation) tallied just 1,633 Coptic Orthodox.

In Switzerland, the first Copts arrived in the 1960s, mostly students and those fleeing Egypt after the 1952 revolution. The first Coptic church in Switzerland opened in 2004, when there were approximately 1,000 Copts in the country.

=== Socioeconomics ===
Copts in Egypt are generally characterized by relatively high levels of educational attainment, income, and representation in professional and white-collar occupations, though their participation in security-related institutions remains limited. Most socioeconomic and health indicators among Copts in Egypt are broadly comparable to those of Egyptian Muslims. Historical data also suggest that Egyptian Christians have been overrepresented in the country's middle and upper-middle classes. As of 2016, 36% of Egyptian Christians had completed university education in institutions of higher education, among the highest rates in the Middle East and North Africa.

Throughout the 19th and early 20th centuries, Copts held significant roles in Egypt's financial and administrative sectors. They were widely employed as accountants in government offices, and by the 1960s, reportedly owned 51% of the country's banking institutions. In the mid-20th century, Christians were estimated to represent 45% of Egypt's medical doctors and 60% of its pharmacists.

Several Coptic families have attained significant economic influence, particularly in the private sector. The Sawiris family, through its Orascom conglomerate, became one of Egypt's most prominent business dynasties in the early 2000s, with interests spanning telecommunications, construction, tourism, and technology. In 2008, Forbes estimated their combined wealth at $36 billion.

Some scholars attribute the high educational and economic profile of the Coptic community to a historical emphasis within the Coptic community on literacy and the development of human capital.

== Language ==
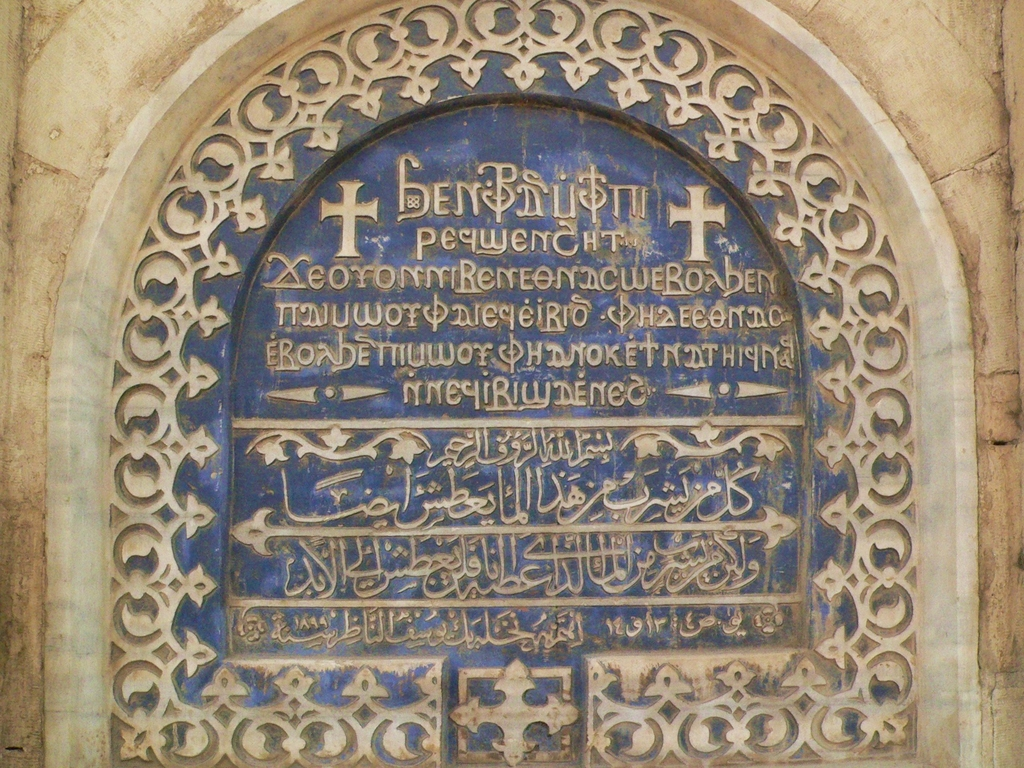
Coptic and Arabic inscriptions in an Old Cairo church

The Coptic language is the most recent stage of the Egyptian language. Scholars argue that "Coptic" should more correctly be used to refer to the script rather than the language itself. Even though this script was introduced as far back as the 1st century BC, it has been applied to the writing of the Egyptian language from the 1st century AD to the present day.

Coptic continued to flourish as a literary language in Egypt until the 13th century. It was supplanted by Egyptian Arabic in Lower Egypt and Sa'idi Arabic in Upper Egypt toward the 16th century but remained part of the education of intellectual Copts until the middle of the 17th century, and was still taught regularly in Coptic schools. In the early 19th century, Coptic was instrumental in Champollion's success in deciphering the Egyptian hieroglyphs.

While Coptic is extinct today, it is still the liturgical language of the native Egyptian Churches (the Coptic Orthodox Church and the Coptic Catholic Church). It is taught worldwide in many prestigious institutions, but its teaching within Egypt remains limited.

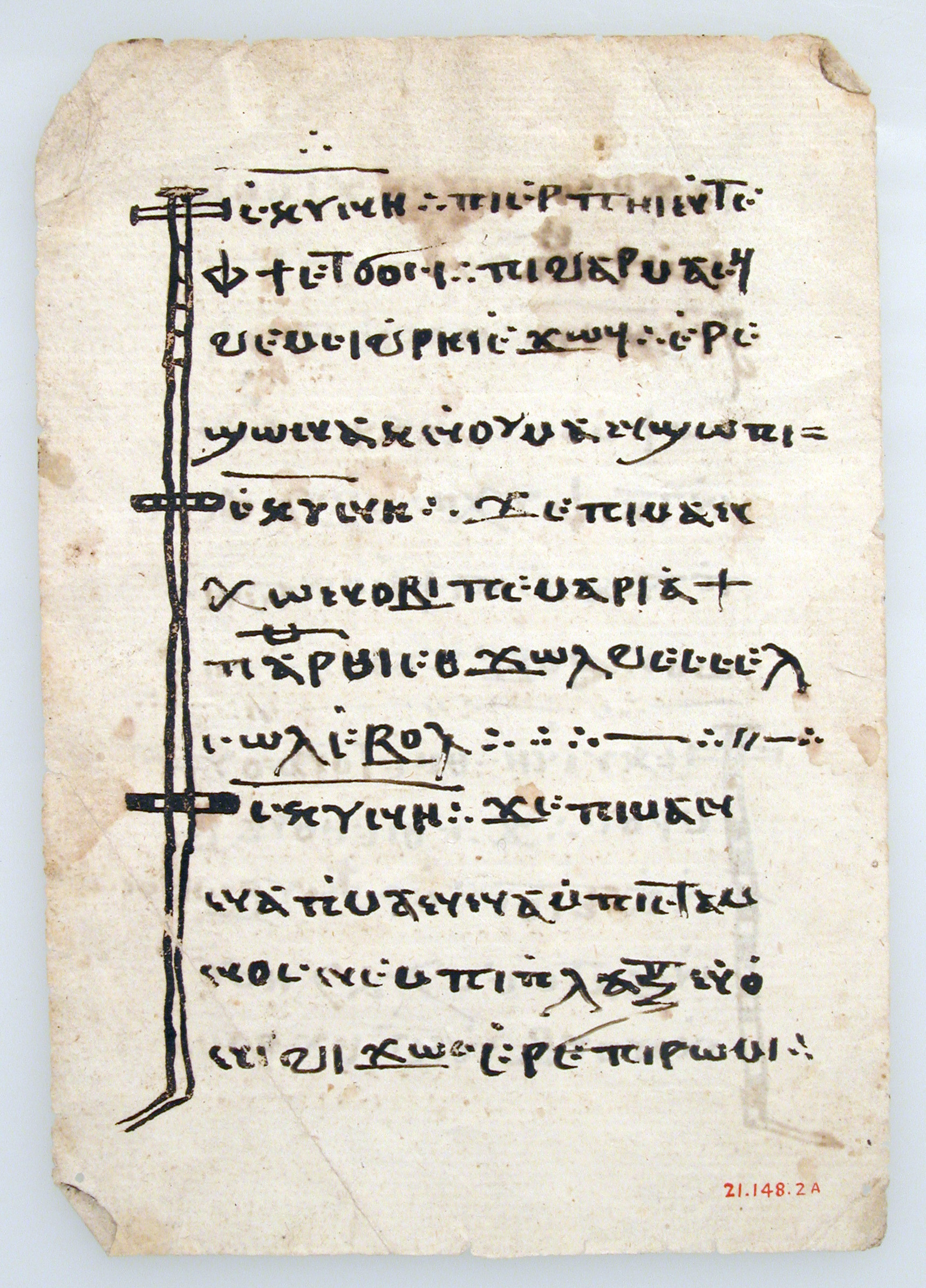
Leaf from a Coptic manuscript, 6th–14th century, Metropolitan museum of art, New York, USA

Dialects of the Coptic language include:

- Sahidic; also known as Theban or Upper Egyptian
- Bohairic; the dialect of the Nile Delta and of the medieval and modern Coptic Church
- Akhmimic
- Lycopolitan; also known as Subakhmimic
- Fayyumic
- Oxyrhynchite

== Calendar ==
The Coptic calendar, also called the Alexandrian calendar, is used by the Coptic Orthodox Church and also by Ethiopia as its official calendar (with different names). This calendar is based on the ancient Egyptian calendar. To avoid the calendar creep of the latter, a reform of the ancient Egyptian calendar was introduced at the time of Ptolemy III (Decree of Canopus, in 238 BC), which consisted of the intercalation of a sixth epagomenal day every fourth year. However, this reform was opposed by Egyptian priests, and the idea was not adopted until 25 BC, when the Roman Emperor Augustus formally reformed the calendar of Egypt, keeping it forever synchronized with the newly introduced Julian calendar. To distinguish it from the Ancient Egyptian calendar, which remained in use by some astronomers until medieval times, this reformed calendar is known as the Coptic calendar. Its years and months coincide with those of the Ethiopian calendar but have different numbers and names.

=== Coptic year ===
Coptic Orthodox Cross with traditional Coptic script reading: 'Jesus Christ, the Son of God'

The Coptic year is the extension of the ancient Egyptian civil year, retaining its subdivision into the three seasons, four months each. The three seasons are commemorated by special prayers in the Coptic liturgy. This calendar is still in use all over Egypt by farmers to keep track of the various agricultural seasons. The Coptic calendar has 13 months, 12 of 30 days each, and an intercalary month at the end of the year of 5 or 6 days, depending whether the year is a leap year or not. The year starts on 29 August in the Julian Calendar or on the 30th in the year before (Julian) leap years. The Coptic leap year follows the same rules as the Julian Calendar so that the extra month always has six days in the year before a Julian Leap Year.

The Feast of Neyrouz marks the first day of the Coptic year. Its celebration falls on the first day of the month of Thout, the first month of the Egyptian year, which for AD 1901 to 2098 usually coincides with 11 September of the Gregorian calendar, except before a Gregorian leap year when it's 12 September. Coptic years are counted from 284 AD, the year Diocletian became Roman Emperor, whose reign was marked by tortures and mass executions of Christians, especially in Egypt. Hence, the Coptic year is identified by the abbreviation A.M. (for Anno Martyrum or "Year of the Martyrs"). The A.M. abbreviation is also used for the unrelated Jewish year (Anno Mundi).

Every fourth Coptic year is a leap year without exception, as in the Julian calendar, so the above-mentioned new year dates apply only between AD 1900 and 2099 inclusive in the Gregorian Calendar. In the Julian Calendar, the new year is always 29 August, except before a Julian leap year when it's 30 August. Easter is reckoned by the Julian Calendar in the Old Calendarist way.

To obtain the Coptic year number, subtract from the Julian year number either 283 (before the Julian new year) or 284 (after it).

== Music ==
Coptic music is the music sung and played in the Coptic Orthodox Church and the Coptic Catholic Church. It has some roots in ancient Egyptian music and many elements of ancient Egyptian music continue to survive in Coptic liturgical music, with additional Byzantine and Hebrew influences. It consists mainly of chanted hymns in rhythm with instruments such as cymbals (hand and large size) and the triangle. The percussion instruments used in the Coptic Church are unusual among Christian liturgies. Since similar instruments appear in ancient Egyptian frescoes and reliefs, some believe that they may represent a survival from a very old tradition. Coptic music is purely religious.

Coptic chants are an ancient tradition that has been linked to the musical practices of ancient Egypt. One example is a hymn sung on Good Friday, which may be derived from melodies used by ancient Egyptian priests during royal funerary rites.

Coptic music has been transmitted orally over thousands of years, and only recently have manuscripts, musical notes, and books been used to record it.

== Persecution and discrimination ==
Religious freedom in Egypt is constitutionally guaranteed but restricted in practice, particularly for the Coptic Christian minority. Discriminatory policies and bureaucratic hurdles have historically hampered the construction and repair of churches. Until 2005, presidential approval was required for even minor repairs, but this requirement was delegaed to governors and further eased by the 2016 Church Construction Law.

Copts have been the target of sectarian violence. Notable incidents include the 1999–2000 El-Kosheh clashes that left 21 dead, attacks on Alexandrian churches in 2006, and mob violence in Marsa Matrouh in 2010. Reports from the same period indicate that police frequently arrived too late to prevent violence, pressured Copts into "reconciliation" sessions, and rarely prosecuted attackers.

Following the 2013 ousting of President Mohamed Morsi, churches and Christian properties were targeted in retaliatory attacks. At least 45 churches were attacked, with accusations that Muslim Brotherhood rhetoric incited the violence.

Human trafficking and forced conversions have also been reported. Coptic women and girls have been subject to abduction, coercion, and forced marriage, with congressional and NGO concern raised about state inaction and complicity.

Copts are underrepresented in public office, security services, and judiciary positions. During President Mubarak's tenure, only a few Copts held cabinet or gubernatorial positions.

Religious conversion laws in Egypt remain asymmetrical. While conversion to Islam is easily recognized, Christians converting from Islam face legal and bureaucratic obstacles. Some converts have been arrested or denied identity documents. Though a 2008 court ruling allowed 12 citizens to re-register as Christians after converting to Islam, it required them to list their period as Muslims on official documents.

Recent years have seen incremental improvements. Church construction has become easier, with thousands of churches legalized under the 2016 law and fewer reports of obstruction. In Open Doors' World Watch List, Egypt dropped from 25th place out of 50 in 2013 to 40th in 2025, indicating a decline in reported persecution, though social and legal challenges remain.

== Church affairs ==
Today, members of the non-Chalcedonian Coptic Orthodox Church constitute the majority of the Egyptian Christian population. Diaspora communities of other Christians, especially ones from across the Middle East, have added to the diversity of churches in Egypt (such communities are not Egyptians themselves); this includes sister Oriental Orthodox Churches (Syriac Orthodox Church, Armenian Apostolic Church, and Ethiopian Orthodox Tewahedo Church), Roman Catholic Churches, Eastern Catholic Churches, and Protestant churches. Western missionary efforts have also led to the conversion of local Copts to various Protestant churches. The term "Coptic" remains exclusive, however, to the Egyptian natives, as opposed to the Christians of non-Egyptian origins. Some Protestant churches for instance are called "Coptic Evangelical Church", thus helping differentiate their native Egyptian congregations from churches attended by non-Egyptian immigrant communities such as Europeans or Americans.

The previous head of the Coptic Orthodox Church, Pope Shenouda III of Alexandria, died on 17 March 2012. On 4 November 2012, Bishop Tawadros was chosen as the new pope of Egypt's Coptic Christians. His name was selected from a glass bowl containing the three shortlisted candidates by a blindfolded boy at a ceremony in Cairo's St Mark's Cathedral.

== Identity ==
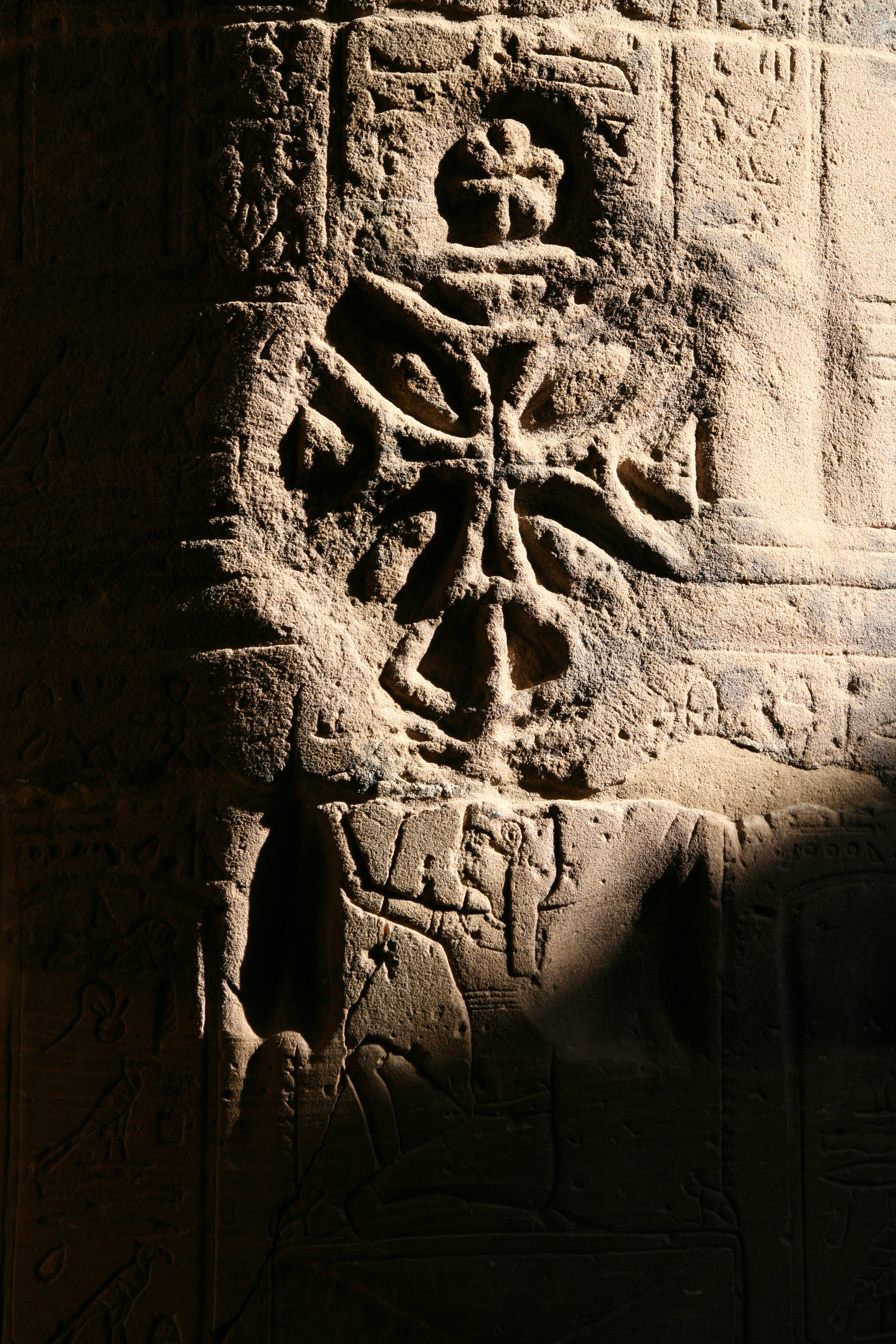
Coptic Cross on a column in the Temple of Philae

Copts have historically maintained a strong sense of Egyptian identity, which has played a role in their cultural and religious expression. Throughout history, Copts have expressed resistance to broader regional identities such as pan-Arabism and Islamism, while emphasizing their connection to Egypt.

The formulation of Coptic identity in the ethnic sense began in Greco-Roman Egypt against the backdrop of foreign rulers, first the Ptolemies and subsequently the Roman emperors. In Greco-Roman Egypt, the term Copt designated the local population of Egypt, as opposed to the elite group of foreign rulers and settlers (Greeks, Romans, etc.) who came to Egypt from other regions and established prominent empires. During that period, foreign rulers respected the Egyptians and their local religion, and erected many temples for Egyptian gods, such as the Temple of Horus in Edfu and the Temple of Hathor at Dendra. Despite the presence of these immigrants and a foreign pharaoh, Egypt remained home primarily to Egyptians, by far the largest group within the population. In fact, most of the rural and urban native population that lived in towns, villages and hamlets the length of the Nile Valley continued their lives little changed during the rule of the Ptolemies. Even in Alexandria, the capital of Ptolemaic Egypt and the largest Greek city outside of Greece, the number of native Egyptians far outnumbered that of Greeks. In numbers and in culture, Egypt remained essentially Egyptian.

The foundation for defining the Copts as an ethno-religious group rather than just an ethnic group began in the fourth and fifth centuries AD, as divergence in doctrine between the native Christian Church of the Egyptians and that of the empire began. The persecution and exile in the fourth century by emperor Constantine the Great of Athanasius, the native Egyptian patriarch of the Church of Alexandria, became the embodiment of the Egyptian character of the Church in Egypt. The persecution of Athanasius helped to create a type for the later patriarchs of Alexandria, who were repeatedly portrayed as defenders of the truth against outsiders and non-Egyptians. The official schism occurred at the Council of Chalcedon in 451 AD. The council, which condemned, deposed, exiled, and replaced the native Egyptian patriarch of Alexandria, Dioscorus I, was rejected by the Egyptian delegation to the council, and by extension by the entirety of the native Egyptian population. As a result of the Council of Chalcedon, the Church of Alexandria, which had jurisdiction over the entire country of Egypt, as well as all of continent of Africa, was divided into a church that accepted the decrees of the council, and one that rejected them. The church that accepted the council, became known as the Chalcedonian church, and survives today as the Greek Orthodox Patriarchate of Alexandria. On the other hand, the church that rejected the council of Chalcedon, to whom the vast majority of the native Egyptians adhered, became the predecessor of the Coptic Orthodox Church.

The process of identity-building for the native Egyptians emerged into view most clearly in the period after the reign of emperor Justinian I in the sixth century AD. That process became the foundation for the evolution of a distinctive Egyptian character for the Coptic Orthodox Church, with its distancing from the empire's official doctrine and its distinctive Greek character. Copts viewed their Church as one with direct doctrinal continuity with such Egyptian patristic giants as Athanasius of Alexandria and Cyril of Alexandria, both of whom were popes of the Church of Alexandria, and whose theology was the foundation of worldwide orthodox Christian belief. Another important aspect of the Coptic community's self-perception was its ethnic and religious continuity with the community that produced the many local Egyptian martyrs.

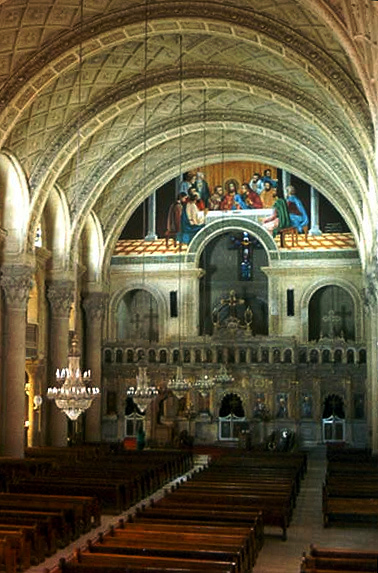
St. Mark Coptic Cathedral in Alexandria

By the time of the Arab conquest of Egypt in 641 AD, the Copts had formed a distinct ethno-religious identity that was Egyptian and non-Chalcedonian, as opposed to the mainly Greek Byzantine Chalcedonian identity of the ruling empire. Under Arab Muslim rule, according to Bagnall and other historians, a combination of factors including heavy taxation i.e., the jizya (a tax levied exclusively on non-Muslims under Islamic Sharia law), avoidance of forced labor or conscription, fear of persecution, and the prospect of greater social and legal mobility led many Egyptians to gradually convert to Islam over the following centuries. Those Copts who converted to Islam were known as Mawali (non-Arab Muslims), and they held a lower social and legal status than Arab Muslims during the early Islamic period. In early Islamic Egypt, "Arab" referred mainly to the ruling elite of Arab descent. Within the social hierarchy of the time, Coptic Christians classified as dhimmis occupied a lower legal and social status than both Arab Muslims and Mawali (non-Arab converts to Islam). Over time, the term "Copt" came to exclusively identify Egyptians who maintained their Christian faith.

Under Islamic rule, Coptic identity continued to be defined against the backdrop of sound theology and Christology, in contrast to those of the Chalcedonians. However, with the presence of non-natives in the country, Coptic identity also began to stress the native Egyptian character of the Copts. As Muslims, mainly Egyptian converts and less commonly Arabs, slowly started settling in the countryside, they provided an "Other" against whom this identity became better defined. Coptic monasticism played a crucial role in the preservation of Coptic identity in Egypt. The Copts' Egyptian Christian identity was thus formulated. It was then with the spread of Arabic beyond the big cities that the Egyptian Church became known as "Coptic" and that native Egyptian Christians became known as "Copts", a semantic shift that occurred in the eighth and ninth centuries. Nonetheless, in their own native Coptic language, Copts continue to refer to themselves today as ⲛⲓⲣⲉⲙⲛ̀ⲭⲏⲙⲓ (the Egyptians), and to their Church as Ϯⲉⲕ̀ⲕⲗⲏⲥⲓⲁ ⲛ̀ⲣⲉⲙⲛ̀ⲭⲏⲙⲓ ⲛ̀ⲟⲣⲑⲟⲇⲟⲝⲟⲥ (the Egyptian Orthodox Church).

In modern times, the question of Coptic identity was never raised before the rise of pan-Arabism under Nasser in the early 1950s. Up to that point, both Egyptian Muslims and Egyptian Christians viewed themselves as only Egyptians without any Arab sentiment. The struggle to maintain this Egyptian identity began as Nasser and his regime tried to impose an Arab identity on the country, and attempted to erase all references to Egypt as a separate and unique entity. Today, Copts and many Egyptian Muslims reject Arab nationalism, emphasizing indigenous Egyptian heritage and culture as well as their own unique ethnicity and genetic makeup, which are completely different from those of the Arabs. Persecution has become pivotal to the Copts' sense of identity.

== Genetics ==
Following the Arab conquest of Egypt in the 7th century, the term "Copt" became associated with Egypt's native population, who were majority Christian at the time. Over time, the term "Copt" came to represent Egyptian Christians as distinct from Egyptians who had embraced Islam. While cultural and historical connections to ancient Egypt constitute a significant part of Coptic identity, modern Copts are part of the broader Egyptian population, shaped by various cultural influences and their Christian faith. Genetics have shown that both Egypt's Muslim and Christian populations are largely descended from the pre-Islamic Egyptian population.

In the view of scholars Christopher Ehret, David Schoenbrun, Steven A. Brandt, and SOY Keita, the Nile Valley served as a crossroads which resulted in population interactions over a long period of time. They cite a range of published genetic studies which identified E1b1 affinities with the Copt populations that are common among Afro-Asiatic linguistic families including Ethiopian, Cushitic, Beja, Semitic and Berber populations. These authors referenced a range of genetic studies on the Coptic population which include "(Cruciani et al. 2007; Keita 2008) show for its population: 38.3–60% of M35 and 2–6.9% for M2; M89 12– 58%, and smaller percentages of other haplogroups e.g. B. One Coptic sample from a community that emigrated from Egypt to Sudan had frequencies of 17% of M35, 67% of M89, and 15% of B (Hassan et al. 2008). Another sample of Copts from Adaima in Egypt had >70% of M35, majority M78 (Crubezy 2010)".

According to Y-DNA analysis on Copts in Sudan, around 45% of Sudanese Copts carry the Haplogroup J. The remainder mainly belong to the E1b1b clade (21%). Both paternal lineages are common among other local Afroasiatic-speaking populations (Beja, Ethiopians, Sudanese Arabs), as well as the Nubians.

E1b1b/E3b reaches its highest frequencies among North Africans, Levantine Middle Easterners, and Ethiopid East Africans. The next most common haplogroups borne by Copts in Sudan are the European-linked R1b clade (15%), as well as the archaic African B lineage (15%). Maternally, Copts in Sudan exclusively carry various descendants of the macrohaplogroup N. This mtDNA clade is likewise closely associated with local Afroasiatic-speaking populations, including Berbers and Ethiopid peoples. Of the N derivatives borne by Copts, U6 is most frequent (28%), followed by the haplogroup T (17%). Genetic studies have shown the ancient Egyptians to be genetically intermediary between the populations of Southern Europe and Nubia (two frequently-used reference points).

Families celebrating after the baptism of their children in an Orthodox church in Egypt

A 2015 study by Dobon et al. identified an ancestral autosomal component of Western Eurasian origin that is common to many modern Afroasiatic-speaking populations in Northeast Africa. Known as the Coptic component, it peaks among Egyptian Copts who settled in Sudan over the past two centuries. In their analysis, Sudan's Copts formed a separated group in the PCA, a close outlier to other Egyptians, Afro-Asiatic-speaking Northeast Africans and Middle East populations. The scientists suggest that this points to a common origin for the general population of Egypt, or Middle Eastern and North African populations. Copts in general shared the same main ancestral component with North African/Middle Eastern populations. The study affirms that Copts are recognized as the most ancient population of Egypt, as the Sudanese Copts did not display the later Arabian influence that is present among the modern Egyptian population.

A 2017 genome-wide study by Hollfelder et al. analyzed approximately 3.9 million SNPs from 18 different populations in Sudan and South Sudan, including members of the Coptic community. The Copts, identified as an ethnic group that migrated from Egypt to Sudan around 200 years ago were compared to Egyptians from Egypt using ADMIXTURE and principal component analyses. The Copts displayed a genetic profile closely resembling that of Egyptians. At lower numbers of clusters, both groups appeared admixed between Near Eastern/European and northeastern Sudanese populations. At higher resolution (K≥18), the Copts formed a distinct ancestry component also present in Egyptians.

The study found low genetic differentiation between the two groups (FST = 0.00236) as well as nearly identical levels of estimated European ancestry, 69.54% ± 2.57 in the Copts and 70.65% ± 2.47 in Egyptians. Formal D-statistics revealed no significant evidence of differential admixture from other groups into either population. Both also exhibited low genetic diversity and extended runs of homozygosity compared to other northeast African and Middle Eastern groups. The authors concluded that the Copts and Egyptians share a common population history, with the Copts remaining relatively isolated since their migration to Sudan.

A 2020 study investigating genetic correlations between Egyptian Muslims and Egyptian Christians analyzed allele frequencies across nine autosomal STR loci (D3S1358, VWA, FGA, THO1, TPOX, CSF1PO, D5S818, D13S317, and D7S820) using DNA samples from 200 unrelated individuals, equally divided between the two groups. The samples were drawn from various locations across Egypt. Using allele frequency statistics, forensic efficiency parameters, population homogeneity charts, and graphical analyses, the study evaluated the degree of genetic similarity between the two groups. The findings revealed strong genetic correlation and no significant differentiation, leading the authors to conclude that Egyptian Muslims and Christians genetically originate from the same ancestral population.

== Prominent Copts ==
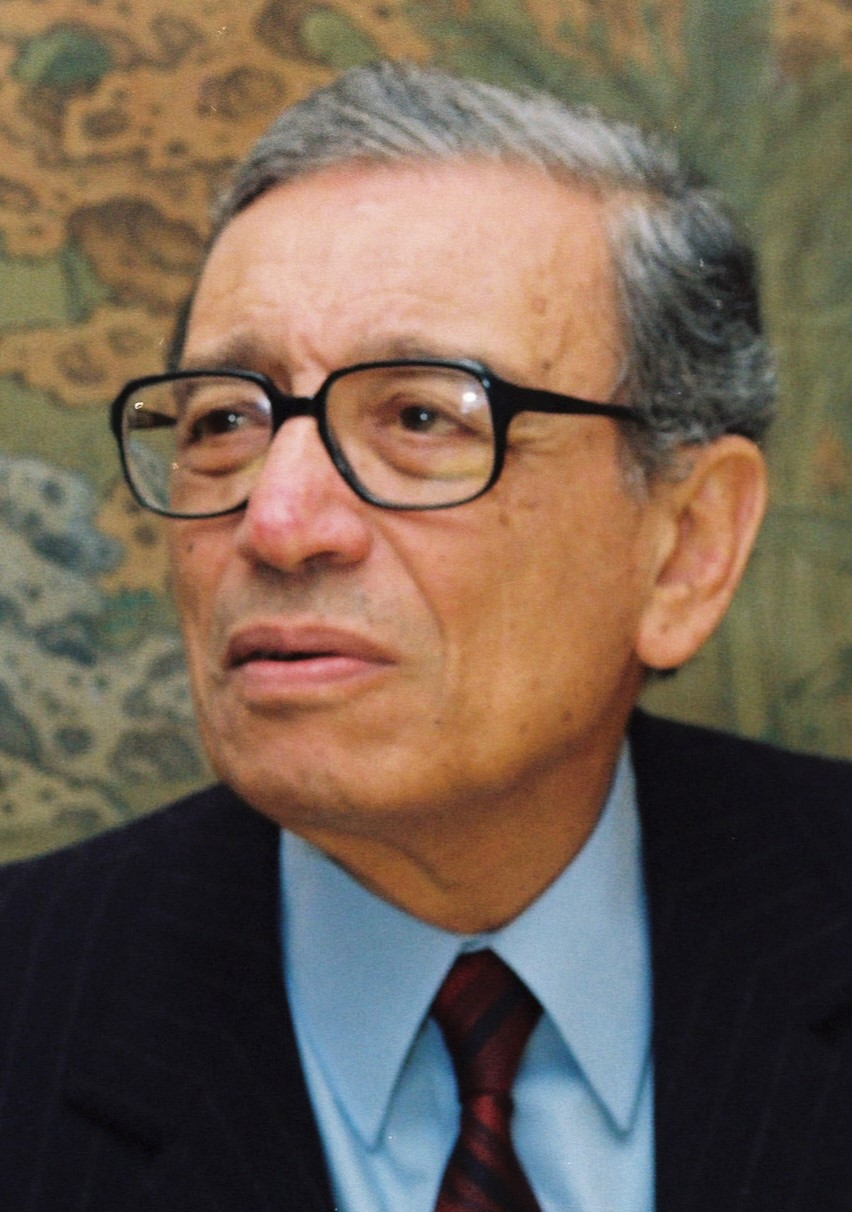
Boutros Boutros-Ghali, former Secretary-General of the United Nations

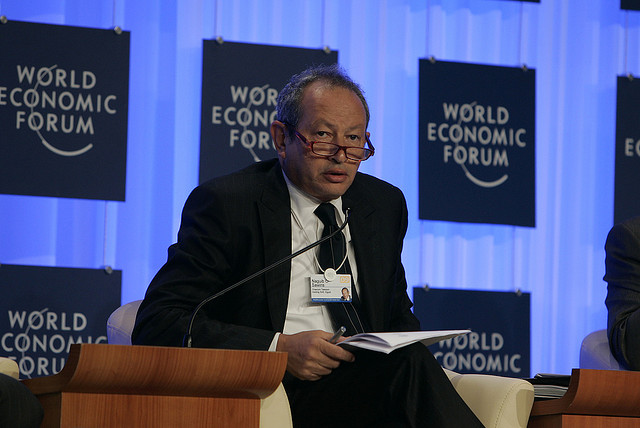
Naguib Sawiris of the wealthy Sawiris family, purportedly the second-richest person in Egypt after his brother, Samih

Some famous Copts include:

- Boutros Boutros-Ghali, sixth Secretary-General of the United Nations.
- Charlotte Wassef, Miss Universe 1935
- Dina Powell, American Politician.
- Fayez Sarofim, heir to the Sarofim family fortune.
- Halim El-Dabh, musician and academic.
- Hani Azer, prominent civil engineer.
- Jean Messiha, Egyptian-French politician.
- Magdi Yacoub, cardiothoracic surgeon.
- Marty Makary, 26th Commissioner of Food and Drugs
- Mena Massoud, actor.
- Naguib Sawiris, billionaire and CEO of Orascom.
- Pahor Labib, Egyptologist.
- Rami Malek, actor.
- Samih Sawiris, businessman, investor and billionaire.
- Sam Soliman, boxer.
- Youssef Wahba, twelfth Prime Minister of Egypt.

== See also ==
- Aegyptus, in Greek mythology
- Coptic art
- Coptic Catholic Church
- Coptic diaspora
- Coptic identity
- Coptic language
- Coptic literature
- Copto-Arabic literature
- Coptic Museum
- Coptic Orthodox Church
- International Coptic Union
- List of Coptic saints
- Coptology
- Christianity in Egypt
- Christianity in Sudan
- Christianity in Libya
- List of prominent Copts worldwide
